= Chapter 28 =

Chapter Twenty-Eight refers to a 28th chapter in a book.

Chapter Twenty-Eight, Chapter 28, or Chapter XXVIII may also refer to:

== Television ==
- "Chapter 28" (Eastbound & Down)
- "Chapter 28" (House of Cards)
- "Chapter Twenty-Eight" (Boston Public)
- "Chapter Twenty-Eight: Sabrina Is Legend", an episode of Chilling Adventures of Sabrina
- "Chapter Twenty-Eight: There Will Be Blood", an episode of Riverdale
