= Chapter 30 =

Chapter 30 refers to a 30th chapter in a book.

Chapter Thirty, Chapter 30, or Chapter XXX may also refer to:

== Television ==
- "Chapter 30" (House of Cards)
- "Chapter Thirty" (Boston Public)
- "Chapter Thirty: The Noose Tightens", an episode of Riverdale
- "Chapter Thirty: The Uninvited", an episode of Chilling Adventures of Sabrina

== Other uses ==
- Chapter 30 (G.I. Bill of Rights)
