= Chapter 27 (disambiguation) =

Chapter 27 is a 2007 film.

Chapter Twenty-Seven, Chapter 27, or Chapter XXVII may also refer to:

== Television ==
- "Chapter 27" (Eastbound & Down)
- "Chapter 27" (House of Cards)
- "Chapter 27" (Legion)
- "Chapter Twenty-Seven" (Boston Public)
- "Chapter Twenty-Seven: The Hills Have Eyes", an episode of Riverdale
- "Chapter Twenty-Seven: The Judas Kiss", an episode of Chilling Adventures of Sabrina
