= Chapter 35 =

Chapter 35 refers to a 35th chapter in a book.

Chapter Thirty-Five, Chapter 35, or Chapter XXXV may also refer to:

== Television ==
- "Chapter 35" (House of Cards)
- "Chapter Thirty-Five" (Boston Public)
- "Chapter Thirty-Five: Brave New World", an episode of Riverdale
- "Chapter Thirty-Five: The Endless", an episode of Chilling Adventures of Sabrina

== Other uses ==
- Chapter 35 (G.I. Bill of Rights)
