= Chapter 34 =

Chapter 34 refers to a 34th chapter in a book.

Chapter Thirty-Four, Chapter 34, or Chapter XXXIV may also refer to:

== Television ==
- "Chapter 34" (House of Cards)
- "Chapter Thirty-Four" (Boston Public)
- "Chapter Thirty-Four: Judgment Night", an episode of Riverdale
- "Chapter Thirty-Four: The Returned", an episode of Chilling Adventures of Sabrina

== Other uses ==
- Chapter 34 (G.I. Bill of Rights)
