= Chapter 32 =

Chapter 32 refers to a 32nd chapter in a book.

Chapter Thirty-Two, Chapter 32, or Chapter XXXII may also refer to:

== Television ==
- "Chapter 32" (House of Cards)
- "Chapter Thirty-Two" (Boston Public)
- "Chapter Thirty-Two: The Imp of the Perverse", an episode of Chilling Adventures of Sabrina
- "Chapter Thirty-Two: Prisoners", an episode of Riverdale

== Other uses ==
- Chapter 32 (G.I. Bill of Rights)
