= Chapter 29 =

Chapter Twenty-Nine refers to a 29th chapter in a book.

Chapter Twenty-Nine, Chapter 29, or Chapter XXIX may also refer to:

== Television ==
- "Chapter 29" (Eastbound & Down)
- "Chapter 29" (House of Cards)
- "Chapter Twenty-Nine" (Boston Public)
- "Chapter Twenty-Nine: The Eldritch Dark", an episode of Chilling Adventures of Sabrina
- "Chapter Twenty-Nine: Primary Colors", an episode of Riverdale
