= Chapter 15 (disambiguation) =

Chapter 15, Title 11, United States Code is a component of United States bankruptcy laws.

Chapter Fifteen, Chapter 15, or Chapter XV may also refer to:

- A fifteenth chapter in a book

== Television ==
- "Chapter 15" (Eastbound & Down)
- "Chapter 15" (House of Cards)
- "Chapter 15" (Legion)
- "Chapter 15" (Star Wars: Clone Wars), an episode of Star Wars: Clone Wars
- "Chapter 15: The Believer", an episode of The Mandalorian
- "Chapter Fifteen" (Boston Public)
- "Chapter Fifteen: Doctor Cerberus's House of Horror", an episode of Chilling Adventures of Sabrina
- "Chapter Fifteen: Nighthawks", an episode of Riverdale

== Other uses ==
- Chapter XV of the United Nations Charter
