= Chapter 25 =

Chapter Twenty-Five refers to a 25th chapter in a book.

Chapter Twenty-Five, Chapter 25, or Chapter XXV may also refer to:

== Television ==
- "Chapter 25" (Eastbound & Down)
- "Chapter 25" (House of Cards)
- "Chapter 25" (Legion)
- "Chapter 25" (Star Wars: Clone Wars), an episode of Star Wars: Clone Wars
- "Chapter Twenty-Five" (Boston Public)
- "Chapter Twenty-Five: The Devil Within", an episode of Chilling Adventures of Sabrina
- "Chapter Twenty-Five: The Wicked and the Divine", an episode of Riverdale
