= Chapter 21 =

Chapter Twenty-One refers to a 21st chapter in a book.

Chapter Twenty-one, Chapter 21, or Chapter XXI may also refer to:

== Television ==
- "Chapter 21" (Eastbound & Down)
- "Chapter 21" (House of Cards)
- "Chapter 21" (Legion)
- "Chapter 21" (Star Wars: Clone Wars), an episode of Star Wars: Clone Wars
- "Chapter 21: The Pirate", an episode of The Mandalorian
- "Chapter Twenty-One" (Boston Public)
- "Chapter Twenty-One: The Hellbound Heart", an episode of Chilling Adventures of Sabrina
- "Chapter Twenty-One: House of the Devil", an episode of Riverdale
