= Chapter 31 =

Chapter 31 refers to a 31st chapter in a book.

Chapter Thirty-One, Chapter 31, or Chapter XXXI may also refer to:

== Television ==
- "Chapter 31" (House of Cards)
- "Chapter Thirty-One" (Boston Public)
- "Chapter Thirty-One: A Night to Remember", an episode of Riverdale
- "Chapter Thirty-One: The Weird", an episode of Chilling Adventures of Sabrina

== Other uses ==
- Chapter 31 (G.I. Bill of Rights)
