= Chapter 36 =

Chapter 36 refers to a 36th chapter in a book.

Chapter Thirty-Six, Chapter 36, or Chapter XXXVI may also refer to:

== Television ==
- "Chapter 36" (House of Cards)
- "Chapter Thirty-Six" (Boston Public)
- "Chapter Thirty-Six: At the Mountains of Madness", an episode of Chilling Adventures of Sabrina
- "Chapter Thirty-Six: Labor Day", an episode of Riverdale
