= Chapter 14 =

Chapter Fourteen refers to a fourteenth chapter in a book.

Chapter Fourteen, Chapter 14, or Chapter XIV may also refer to:

== Music ==
- Chapter 14 (band), an American post-hardcore/alternative rock band from Carlsbad, California

== Television ==
- "Chapter 14" (Eastbound & Down)
- "Chapter 14" (House of Cards)
- "Chapter 14" (Legion)
- "Chapter 14" (Star Wars: Clone Wars), an episode of Star Wars: Clone Wars
- "Chapter 14: The Tragedy", an episode of The Mandalorian
- "Chapter Fourteen" (Boston Public)
- "Chapter Fourteen: A Kiss Before Dying", an episode of Riverdale
- "Chapter Fourteen: Lupercalia", an episode of Chilling Adventures of Sabrina

== Other uses ==
- Chapter XIV of the United Nations Charter
