= Chapter 26 =

Chapter Twenty-Six refers to a 26th chapter in a book.

Chapter Twenty-Six, Chapter 26, or Chapter XXVI may also refer to:

== Television ==
- "Chapter 26" (Eastbound & Down)
- "Chapter 26" (House of Cards)
- "Chapter 26" (Legion)
- "Chapter Twenty-Six" (Boston Public)
- "Chapter Twenty-Six: All of Them Witches", an episode of Chilling Adventures of Sabrina
- "Chapter Twenty-Six: The Tell-Tale Heart", an episode of Riverdale
