= Chapter 23 =

Chapter Twenty-Three refers to a 23rd chapter in a book.

Chapter Twenty-Three, Chapter 23, or Chapter XXIII may also refer to:

== Television ==
- "Chapter 23" (Eastbound & Down)
- "Chapter 23" (House of Cards)
- "Chapter 23" (Legion)
- "Chapter 23" (Star Wars: Clone Wars), an episode of Star Wars: Clone Wars
- "Chapter 23: The Spies", an episode of The Mandalorian
- "Chapter Twenty-Three" (Boston Public)
- "Chapter Twenty-Three: The Blackboard Jungle", an episode of Riverdale
- "Chapter Twenty-Three: Heavy Is the Crown", an episode of Chilling Adventures of Sabrina
