= Chapter 18 =

Chapter Eighteen refers to an eighteenth chapter in a book.

Chapter Eighteen, Chapter 18, or Chapter XVIII may also refer to:

== Television ==
- "Chapter 18" (Eastbound & Down)
- "Chapter 18" (House of Cards)
- "Chapter 18" (Legion)
- "Chapter 18" (Star Wars: Clone Wars), an episode of Star Wars: Clone Wars
- "Chapter 18: The Mines of Mandalore", an episode of The Mandalorian
- "Chapter Eighteen" (Boston Public)
- "Chapter Eighteen: The Miracles of Sabrina Spellman", an episode of Chilling Adventures of Sabrina
- "Chapter Eighteen: When a Stranger Calls", an episode of Riverdale

== Other uses ==
- Chapter XVIII of the United Nations Charter
