= Chapter 20 =

Chapter Twenty refers to a twentieth chapter in a book.

Chapter Twenty, Chapter 20, or Chapter XX may also refer to:

== Television ==
- "Chapter 20" (Eastbound & Down)
- "Chapter 20" (House of Cards)
- "Chapter 20" (Legion)
- "Chapter 20" (Star Wars: Clone Wars), an episode of Star Wars: Clone Wars
- "Chapter 20: The Foundling", an episode of The Mandalorian
- "Chapter Twenty" (Boston Public)
- "Chapter Twenty: The Mephisto Waltz", an episode of Chilling Adventures of Sabrina
- "Chapter Twenty: Tales from the Darkside", an episode of Riverdale
