= Chapter 16 (disambiguation) =

Chapter 16 is a mixtape by Clavish.

Chapter 16, Chapter Sixteen, or Chapter XVI may also refer to:

== Television ==
- "Chapter 16" (Eastbound & Down)
- "Chapter 16" (House of Cards)
- "Chapter 16" (Legion)
- "Chapter 16" (Star Wars: Clone Wars), an episode of Star Wars: Clone Wars
- "Chapter 16: The Rescue", an episode of The Mandalorian
- "Chapter Sixteen" (Boston Public)
- "Chapter Sixteen: Blackwood", an episode of Chilling Adventures of Sabrina
- "Chapter Sixteen: The Watcher in the Woods", an episode of Riverdale

== Other uses ==
- Chapter XVI of the United Nations Charter
