= Chapter 22 =

Chapter Twenty-Two refers to a 22nd chapter in a book.

Chapter Twenty-Two, Chapter 22, or Chapter XXII may also refer to:

== Television ==
- "Chapter 22" (Eastbound & Down)
- "Chapter 22" (House of Cards)
- "Chapter 22" (Legion)
- "Chapter 22" (Star Wars: Clone Wars), an episode of Star Wars: Clone Wars
- "Chapter 22: Guns for Hire", an episode of The Mandalorian
- "Chapter Twenty-Two" (Boston Public)
- "Chapter Twenty-Two: Drag Me to Hell", an episode of Chilling Adventures of Sabrina
- "Chapter Twenty-Two: Silent Night, Deadly Night", an episode of Riverdale
- "Chapter 22", an episode of House of Cards
- "Chapter 22", an episode of Legion
