= Chapter 19 =

Chapter Nineteen refers to a nineteenth chapter in a book.

Chapter Nineteen, Chapter 19, or Chapter XIV may also refer to:

== Television ==
- "Chapter 19" (Eastbound & Down)
- "Chapter 19" (House of Cards)
- "Chapter 19" (Legion)
- "Chapter 19" (Star Wars: Clone Wars), an episode of Star Wars: Clone Wars
- "Chapter 19: The Convert", an episode of The Mandalorian
- "Chapter Nineteen" (Boston Public)
- "Chapter Nineteen: Death Proof", an episode of Riverdale
- "Chapter Nineteen: The Mandrake", an episode of Chilling Adventures of Sabrina

== Other uses ==
- Chapter XIV of the United Nations Charter
