= Boston Public =

American television series

- Genre: Drama
- Created by: David E. Kelley
- Starring: Jessalyn Gilsig; Chi McBride; Anthony Heald; Nicky Katt; Thomas McCarthy; Loretta Devine; Joey Slotnick; Rashida Jones; Sharon Leal; Fyvush Finkel; Jeri Ryan; Michael Rapaport; Kathy Baker; Jon Abrahams; China Jesusita Shavers; Joey McIntyre; Natalia Baron
- Composer: Danny Lux
- Country of origin: United States
- Original language: English
- No. of seasons: 4
- No. of episodes: 81 (list of episodes)

Production
- Executive producers: David E. Kelley; Jonathan Pontell; Jason Katims
- Running time: 44 minutes
- Production companies: David E. Kelley Productions; 20th Century Fox Television

Original release
- Network: Fox
- Release: October 23, 2000 – January 30, 2004

Boston Public is an American drama television series created by David E. Kelley and broadcast on Fox. Set in Boston, the series centers on Winslow High School, a fictional public high school in the Boston Public Schools district. It features a large ensemble cast and focuses on the work and private lives of the various teachers, students, and administrators at the school. It aired from October 2000 to January 2004. Its slogan was "Every day is a fight. For respect. For dignity. For sanity."

== History ==
Boston Public initially preceded Ally McBeal on Monday nights. However, Fox moved it to the Friday night death slot for its fourth season. Viewership declined as a result and it was canceled after the 13th episode aired on January 30, 2004. Production halted after the 15th episode was completed. The final two episodes aired on March 1 and 2, 2005, later in syndication on TV One. Neither episode wrapped up any character stories.

The title of each episode was a numbered chapter, similar to that in a high school textbook, and each character appeared in a given story arc, with the professional and personal lives often intersecting.

Boston Public was the winner of the 2002 Peabody Award for "Chapter Thirty-Seven".

== Cast and characters ==
The first season cast of Boston Public

Actor	Character	Seasons	Role
Chi McBride	Steven Harper	1–4	Principal
Anthony Heald	Scott Guber	1–4	Vice Principal
Jessalyn Gilsig	Lauren Davis	1–2	Social Studies teacher; left Winslow to teach at a private school
Nicky Katt	Harry Senate	1–3 (episodes 1–49)	Teacher of "the Dungeon"; quit in episode 49
Loretta Devine	Marla Hendricks	1–4	Social Studies teacher
Sharon Leal	Marilyn Sudor	1–4	English teacher and music instructor
Fyvush Finkel	Harvey Lipschultz	1–4	History teacher
Rashida Jones	Louisa Fenn	1–2	Secretary
Thomas McCarthy	Kevin Riley	1 (episodes 1–13; special guest appearance in episode 18)	Football coach; fired in episode 13
Joey Slotnick	Milton Buttle	1 (episodes 1–13; special guest appearance in episode 15)	English teacher; fired in episode 13
Kathy Baker	Meredith Peters	1–2; recurring in season 1	Teacher
Jeri Ryan	Ronnie Cooke	2–4	Teacher; assistant vice principal (end of season 3); guidance counselor (season 4)
Michael Rapaport	Danny Hanson	2–4	Teacher
China Jesusita Shavers	Brooke Harper	2–3; recurring in season 2	Student
Jon Abrahams	Zach Fischer	3	Physics teacher
Joey McIntyre	Colin Flynn	3	English Teacher
Michelle Monaghan	Kimberly Woods	3 (episodes 49–57; not featured in opening credits but receives "also starring" billing)	Teacher; transferred to a school in another state to avoid a dangerous, obsessed student in episode 57
Cara DeLizia	Marcy Kendall	2–3 (not featured in opening credits but receives "also starring" billing); guest during season 2	Principal's assistant and student
Natalia Baron	Carmen Torres	4	Physics teacher

== Episodes ==
Boston Public ran for four seasons, consisting of 81 episodes. Each season contained 22 episodes, except the fourth season which had 15 episodes due to cancellation.

Season	Episodes	Originally released	
Season	Episodes	First released	Last released
1	22	October 23, 2000	May 21, 2001
2	22	October 29, 2001	May 20, 2002
3	22	October 21, 2002	May 12, 2003
4	15	September 19, 2003	January 30, 2004

=== Crossover with The Practice ===
In The Practice episode, "The Day After" (season 5, episode 14), Kevin Riley asks Ellenor Frutt to represent him in a school board meeting when he's fired from Winslow High School, which takes place in the Boston Public episode "Chapter Thirteen" (season 1, episode 13). After Boston Public was canceled, Chi McBride reprised the role of Steven Harper on an episode of The Practice spin-off series Boston Legal in the episode "Let Sales Ring" (season 1, episode 16).

== Awards and nominations ==
Boston Public received a total of 31 nominations from various award ceremonies, and won 8 of them.

=== Awards won ===
Emmy Awards

- Outstanding Art Direction for a Single Camera Series (2001)

NAACP Image Awards

- Outstanding Supporting Actress in a Drama Series – Loretta Devine (2001, 2003–2004)

Peabody Awards

- Peabody Award for Episode "Chapter Thirty-Seven"

Young Artist Awards

- Best Performance in a TV Series – Guest Starring Young Actor – Thomas Dekker (2004)

=== Nominations ===
Emmy Awards

- Outstanding Guest Actress in a Drama Series – Kathy Baker (2001)

NAACP Image Awards

- Outstanding Supporting Actress in a Drama Series – Rashida Jones (2002)
- Outstanding Actress in a Drama Series – Loretta Devine (2002)
- Outstanding Supporting Actress in a Drama Series – Vanessa Bell Calloway (2002)
- Outstanding Drama Series (2002–2004)

Television Critics Association Awards

- Individual Achievement in Drama – Chi McBride (2001)

Young Artist Awards

- Best Performance in a TV Drama Series – Guest Starring Young Actress – Ashley Tisdale (2001)
- Best Family TV Drama Series (2002)
- Best Performance in a TV Series – Guest Starring Young Actor – Miko Hughes (2004)

Teen Choice Awards

- Choice TV Breakout Star Female – Tamyra Gray (2003)

== Availability ==
In 2023, TVLine called Boston Public "lost in the digital age," noting its unavailability on either DVD or streaming services.
