= House of Cards season 3 =

Season of the American television drama series House of Cards

House of Cards
- Season 3
- Blu-ray cover
- Showrunner: Beau Willimon
- Starring: Kevin Spacey; Robin Wright; Michael Kelly; Mahershala Ali; Nathan Darrow; Molly Parker; Jayne Atkinson; Jimmi Simpson; Elizabeth Marvel; Derek Cecil; Paul Sparks; Kim Dickens; Lars Mikkelsen
- No. of episodes: 13

Release
- Original network: Netflix
- Original release: February 27, 2015

Season chronology
- ← Previous; Season 2 Next → Season 4

The third season of the American television drama series House of Cards was commissioned on February 4, 2014. Netflix released the season in its entirety on February 27, 2015. The season was filmed from approximately June 12 through December 20, 2014.

The season was recognized with numerous award nominations. Kevin Spacey won the Screen Actors Guild Award for Outstanding Performance by a Male Actor in a Drama Series at the 22nd Screen Actors Guild Awards for his portrayal of Frank Underwood and Reg E. Cathey won the Primetime Emmy Award for Outstanding Guest Actor in a Drama Series at the 67th Primetime Creative Arts Emmy Awards for his portrayal of Freddy Hayes.

== Production ==
On February 4, 2014, Netflix announced it had renewed House of Cards for a third season of undisclosed length. On December 1, 2014, Netflix announced that the third season would be available on February 27, 2015. On February 11, 2015, 10 episodes from the third season became accidentally available on Netflix for approximately 25 minutes due to "a bug in the system"; however, they were quickly removed.

=== Filming ===
In February 2014, Kevin Spacey stated that the show would again film in the Baltimore metropolitan area. On July 3, the show was denied filming access to the Security Council chamber at the Headquarters of the United Nations by Russia through its representative Mikael Agasandyan despite encouragement from Secretary-General of the United Nations Ban Ki-moon. Russia questioned the propriety of filming in the chambers and felt that the room should be kept available for normal uses.

For a third consecutive season, the show filmed episodes at the offices of The Baltimore Sun, which in prior seasons served as the setting for the fictional Washington Herald. Among the municipalities filmed in for the season were Havre de Grace, Maryland, and Aberdeen, Maryland. On August 9, filming of a fictional motorcade at the National Mall caused road closures on Pennsylvania Avenue, Constitution Avenue and Independence Avenue. On October 6, filming occurred at DAR Constitution Hall in Washington, D.C. Other D.C. filming occurred at George Washington University and the Franklin Delano Roosevelt Memorial.

The season finale was planned to be filmed in Northern New Mexico areas in and around Santa Fe and Las Vegas, New Mexico in December 2014. On December 20, 2014, creator Beau Willimon tweeted that principal photography for the season had completed that day.

==== Tax incentives ====
Netflix had received $26 million in tax benefits for the first two seasons, but was only offered a $4-million incentive for season three by Maryland Governor Martin O'Malley, which resulted in its delaying and threatening to move production. By March 2014, it was clear that the requested state tax incentives would not be approved by the Maryland Legislature. In response to Netflix's threat to move production if "sufficient tax incentives" were not provided, the Maryland House of Delegates threatened to use eminent domain power to purchase, condemn, or seize the production assets, equipment, and other property that remained in the state because the production had already been the beneficiary of tens of millions of dollars in tax benefits. By April 6, 2014, the Maryland General Assembly considered various methods to avail the tax incentives. However, the April 7 state budget only included a total of $15 million in tax incentives for filming, leaving a $3.5-million shortfall for House of Cards, which production company Media Rights Capital said might force them to move production. Baltimore Sun longtime television critic David Zurawik felt that the $3.5 million would not keep House of Cards from returning to resume production. As of April 11, some predicted that no matter what happened the season three release date would be delayed. On April 25, a deal was reached to leave the 2015 fiscal year budget with the $3.5-million shortfall, but to allow the producers to collect the $11.5-million unallocated filming credit that remained in the previous year's budget.

=== Casting ===
On May 19, 2014, a May 19–21 casting call was posted in the Baltimore Sun for an NSA Director as well as senators, reporters, military colonels, emergency room doctors and a few other roles with projected shooting availability: June 12 – July 15, 2014. On June 3, 2014, an announcement for a June 7 casting call for extras and day players was made. In August 2014, Nadezhda Tolokonnikova and Maria Alyokhina of the punk band Pussy Riot were confirmed to be in the cast for season 3. In October 2014, two recurring roles were cast; Kim Dickens in an unspecified role, and Jenna Stern as an ambassador at the United Nations. Elizabeth Norment, who played Frank's secretary Nancy Kaufberger, died on October 13.

== Cast ==
- Kevin Spacey as Francis J. Underwood, the President of the United States
- Robin Wright as Claire Underwood, the United States Ambassador to the United Nations and First Lady of the United States
- Michael Kelly as Douglas "Doug" Stamper, Frank Underwood's Chief of Staff
- Elizabeth Marvel as Heather Dunbar, the United States Solicitor General who announces her candidacy for President of the United States.
- Mahershala Ali as Remy Danton, the White House Chief of Staff
- Derek Cecil as Seth Grayson, the White House Press Secretary / White House Communications Director
- Nathan Darrow as Edward Meechum, a United States Secret Service agent
- Molly Parker as Jacqueline "Jackie" Sharp, the House Deputy Minority Whip and a Democratic U.S. Representative from California
- Jimmi Simpson as Gavin Orsay, a computer hacker and FBI informant
- Paul Sparks as Thomas Yates, an author hired by Underwood to write a biography on him
- Kim Dickens as Kate Baldwin, a journalist and White House Correspondent for the Wall Street Telegraph
- Alexander Sokovikov as Alexi Moryakov, the Russian Ambassador to the United Nations
- Jayne Atkinson as Catherine Durant, the United States Secretary of State
- Lars Mikkelsen as Viktor Petrov, the President of the Russian Federation
- Kelly AuCoin as Gary Stamper, Doug Stamper's brother
- Benito Martinez as Hector Mendoza, the Senate Majority Leader and a Republican United States Senator from Arizona
- Larry Pine as Bob Birch, the House Minority Leader and a Democratic U.S. Representative from Michigan
- Reed Birney as Donald Blythe, the Vice President of the United States
- Jenna Stern as Eliana Caspi, the Israeli Ambassador to the United Nations
- Christina Bennett Lind as Sharon, Doug Stamper's physical therapist
- Rachel Brosnahan as Rachel Posner / Cassie Lockhart
- Reg E. Cathey as Frederick 'Freddy' Hayes
- Mozhan Marnò as Ayla Sayyad, a journalist for the Wall Street Telegraph
- Kate Lyn Sheil as Lisa Williams
- Eisa Davis as Cynthia Driscoll, Heather Dunbar's campaign manager
- Curtiss Cook as Terry Womack, the House Minority Whip
- Christian Camargo as Michael Corrigan, an LGBT rights activist
- John Doman as Bishop Charles Eddis
- Shawn Doyle as Alan Cooke, a cardiovascular surgeon and Jackie's boyfriend (and later, husband)
- Frank L. Ridley as Harlan Traub

== Episodes ==
No. overall	No. in season	Title	Directed by	Written by	Original release date	Prod. code
27	1	"Chapter 27"	John David Coles	Beau Willimon	February 27, 2015	HOC-301
Frank, now President of the United States, pushes for a jobs program called America Works (or "AmWorks") in an effort to show progress in his administration. He enlists Rep. Donald Blythe as his Vice President and Remy Danton as his temporary Chief of Staff, filling in for Doug (who was found beaten in the woods and requires extensive surgery and care). Frank orders a drone strike that successfully eliminates a foreign target. Claire sets her sights on becoming the United States Ambassador to the United Nations. Doug makes a slow and painful physical recovery, and has Gavin Orsay (who now works for the FBI) help him locate Rachel. He eventually gives in to the pain from his injuries and breaks his sobriety by having a prostitute squirt bourbon into his mouth using a syringe.
28	2	"Chapter 28"	John David Coles	John Mankiewicz	February 27, 2015	HOC-302
Frank meets with Democratic Party leadership to discuss AmWorks, only to be told they do not want him seeking reelection in 2016. On Frank's behalf, Remy gleans information from House Majority Whip Jackie Sharp on potential 2016 candidates, in exchange for Jackie being named Frank's running mate. The Democratic leaders later tell Frank they will help pass AmWorks in return for not running in 2016; Frank lies to them that he will not seek reelection and provides details on the AmWorks program. The Senate votes against Claire's nomination for UN Ambassador after a heated confirmation hearing. Claire decides to challenge their decision and asks for a recess appointment with Frank's support.
29	3	"Chapter 29"	Tucker Gates	Frank Pugliese	February 27, 2015	HOC-303
Frank has a controversial meeting with President of Russia Viktor Petrov, who rejects Frank's proposal to send UN troops to the Jordan Valley. Secretary of State Cathy Durant and Claire (now UN Ambassador) also work on persuading Petrov to accept. During a state dinner, members of Pussy Riot give an insulting toast to Petrov before rudely leaving. Petrov flirts with Claire all night, eventually kissing her; Claire confides her distrust of Petrov to Durant. Petrov asks Frank to remove the Europe's missile defense system in return for sending Russian troops to the Middle East; when Petrov rejects Frank's proposed compromise, Frank calls off the deal. Claire and Durant make plans to bypass Russia's veto in the United Nations Security Council so the U.S. can still send troops.
30	4	"Chapter 30"	Tucker Gates	Laura Eason	February 27, 2015	HOC-304
Supreme Court Justice Jacobs considers retirement after being diagnosed with Alzheimer's; Frank offers Jacobs' seat to Heather Dunbar, seeing no other way to deter her from running against him in 2016. Dunbar nonetheless announces her presidential candidacy; Doug offers to work for her campaign, sensing that Frank is pushing him away. After Gavin is nearly caught by the FBI for helping Doug find Rachel, Doug has him get close to Rachel's ex, Lisa. Seth Grayson takes away Ayla Sayyad's White House credentials after she embarrasses Frank at a press conference. Claire presents a peacekeeping resolution on the Israel-Palestine conflict to the Security Council, which Russia thwarts by voting against. Russian authorities later arrest Michael Corrigan, an American gay rights activist, which is seen as retaliation for the UN resolution.
31	5	"Chapter 31"	James Foley	Kenneth Lin	February 27, 2015	HOC-305
Frank has the mayor of the District of Columbia help him kickstart AmWorks and appropriates money from FEMA to fund the program, but both Republican Senator Hector Mendoza and Democratic Congressman Bob Birch tell Frank that both parties will fight AmWorks in Congress. Frank encourages Jackie to run in 2016 on a campaign against AmWorks to divert the pressure Dunbar is mounting regarding Russia, promising to make Jackie his running mate in exchange. Jackie gets engaged to surgeon Alan Cooke, upsetting Remy. Reporter Kate Baldwin fills in for Ayla as the White House correspondent for the Wall Street Telegraph. Doug shows Dunbar documents proving Claire lied about her abortion, suggesting she use them against Frank; Dunbar is appalled, but hires Doug anyway. Palestine follows Israel in withdrawing support from the peace-keeping resolution; Claire asks Frank to issue an executive order to commit troops in Israel, thus regaining support for the resolution. Russia agrees to peacefully talk over a compromise for the resolution and release Corrigan.
32	6	"Chapter 32"	James Foley	Melissa James Gibson	February 27, 2015	HOC-306
Gavin meets Lisa and lies about receiving a positive HIV test to get her to open up about Rachel. Frank and Claire fly to Moscow; Claire visits Corrigan in jail to inform him they have negotiated the terms of his release, but Corrigan forgoes his freedom unless Russia changes their anti-gay legislation. Petrov is unwilling to make any deals with the U.S. unless Corrigan makes a public apology to Russia for his unlawful actions as part of his release agreement. Petrov later privately admits to Frank he himself does not approve of the laws Corrigan is protesting, but must uphold them to maintain credibility with his citizens. Corrigan confides to Claire that his marriage is failing but he cannot divorce as it would reflect poorly on his cause; he suggests Claire's marital situation is similar. Frank and Petrov eventually reach a compromise on Corrigan and the UN resolution, but Corrigan hangs himself in his cell while Claire is asleep. At a press conference to announce the Russian-American agreement, a shaken Claire denounces Russia's laws and storms out of the event; Petrov calls off the agreement due to the incident.
33	7	"Chapter 33"	John Dahl	Beau Willimon	February 27, 2015	HOC-307
Tensions worsen between Frank and Claire following the botched Moscow visit. Claire vows to get the Jordan Valley resolution passed through the UN General Assembly, which is being hampered by Israeli interference. Republicans in Congress threaten to amend the Stafford Act to prevent the appropriation of FEMA funds to AmWorks; Frank in turn issues a firm statement in support of America Works on the anniversary of the New Deal. Frank is moved when he notices a stone wall separating the statues of Franklin and Eleanor Roosevelt at the FDR Memorial; he shares his feelings with Claire and gives her the authority to promise aid money to Zimbabwe, thereby enabling the peace resolution to pass the General Assembly in spite of Israel's opposition. The two begin to heal their relationship. One month later, Frank and Claire renew their vows in Gaffney, South Carolina. Frank befriends his new biographer, Tom Yates, who reveals he is not the true author of the novel that launched his career but merely took the credit; Frank in turn reveals to Yates he never felt he was good enough for Claire.
34	8	"Chapter 34"	John Dahl	Bill Kennedy	February 27, 2015	HOC-308
A potentially devastating hurricane threatens the East Coast; Frank faces pressure from FEMA, Congress, and several governors for having defunded the Disaster Relief Fund (DRF) to pay for the America Works trial in D.C. Senate. House leaders demand that Frank sign a bill preventing the future appropriation of funds to AmWorks, in return for replenishing the DRF ahead of the hurricane's landfall. Yates delivers the prologue of his biography to Frank, aware that he will be out of a job if AmWorks is defunded. Yates and Kate start a sexual relationship. Frank offers Freddy, now employed via AmWorks, the job of White House groundskeeper. Seeing no alternative, Frank signs the bipartisan bill and replenishes the DRF ahead of the hurricane, effectively shutting down AmWorks. With Claire's peacekeeping resolution having been passed, Frank decides without congressional support to deploy U.S. troops to the Jordan Valley. Claire later informs Frank that the Russians have decided to commit troops to the Jordan Valley. In Iowa, Dunbar meets with Jackie at Doug's suggestion and convinces her to suspend her campaign for the duration of the natural disaster, much to Frank's chagrin. Despite the setback with AmWorks, Frank commits to seeking reelection in 2016.
35	9	"Chapter 35"	Robin Wright	John Mankiewicz	February 27, 2015	HOC-309
Frank is informed that eight Russians have been killed in an explosion in the Jordan Valley; Israel seeks to blame Palestine for the attack and masses troops near the valley. Petrov blames the U.S. for the casualties and refuses Frank's assistance on determining the cause of death. Claire meets with a Russian ambassador who implies that the Russian FSB was behind the killings in an attempt by Petrov to sabotage the entire peacekeeping mission, which he opposed from the start. Frank in turn approves a mission to send U.S. operatives to determine the cause of the explosion. Gavin tells Doug he has discovered Rachel to be dead; Doug relapses completely and later enters the Oval Office drunk, where he breaks down in front of Frank. Frank blames Dunbar for Doug's relapse and threatens her over the phone. The American operation in the Jordan Valley fails; Petrov calls Frank to inform him that footage of the operation has been leaked to the Israelis.
36	10	"Chapter 36"	Agnieszka Holland	Frank Pugliese	February 27, 2015	HOC-310
Israel institutes a no-fly zone. Frank is confronted about the Jordan Valley mission while campaigning; he wants Jackie to postpone the debate until the crisis is over. Doug asks for his brother's family to visit. Yates reaches out to Tim Corbet to learn more about Frank's past, and asks Claire to meet to hear her part of the story. Moscow recalls Moryakov. Frank decides to meet Petrov in the Jordan Valley, as he needs a fast resolution of the crisis or his chance of winning in Iowa is jeopardized. Claire says that this is a mistake, and he tells her that her peace plan is dead. Petrov demands that Frank dismantle the peacekeeping mission and make concessions on missile defense. He also demands that Claire be removed as UN Ambassador, bragging about how easily he manipulated her into believing that Russia was behind the explosion. Frank reluctantly complies. Gavin visits Lisa at home and admits his deceptions, saying that he is leaving and giving her Doug's contact in case FBI comes looking for him; he leaves her his guinea pig. Frank meets Yates for late night drinks. Yates reminisces about his past as a male prostitute.
37	11	"Chapter 37"	Agnieszka Holland	Melissa James Gibson	February 27, 2015	HOC-311
Gavin reveals to Doug that Rachel is not dead and agrees to release her exact location if Doug can help Gavin's friend. Claire begins campaigning on Frank's behalf while he prepares for the debate, asking Jackie to raise the issue of Dunbar's children's private education. Jackie proposes to Dunbar that the two women join forces against Underwood expecting a position on her staff offered in the event of a win, with the deal falling through when Dunbar refuses. Frank wins the debate and upsets Jackie with an unexpected attack on her. Embarrassed, Jackie confronts Frank, who forcefully refuses to make any concessions. Jackie soon drops out of the race and endorses Dunbar for the nomination. After voicing Jackie's concerns, as well as his own on Frank's treatment of his staff, Remy tells Seth that he is resigning his position as Frank's Chief of Staff. Yates had his first conversation with Claire while she donates blood. Claire suggests she is not completely satisfied with her relationship with Frank. She passes out and Yates calls Frank, who reschedules to campaign with Claire.
38	12	"Chapter 38"	Robin Wright	Beau Willimon	February 27, 2015	HOC-312
Frank asks Claire to take a more active role in his campaign as she is more popular with the public than he, evidenced by Dunbar's lead over him in the polls. Jacobs meets with Dunbar and asks her to replace him on the Supreme Court; although she refuses, Jacobs follows through with his retirement. After Frank reads the first chapter of Yates' book and finds details of his marriage with Claire, he chooses to fire Yates despite Yates' convictions that the book will be a success if it takes this direction. In his disappointment, Yates threatens to release the chapter to someone else but Frank aggressively advises against doing so—when Yates gives the chapter to Kate she is uninterested, much to his frustration. Remy tells Jackie he has chosen to leave politics and relocate despite being offered a job on her team, which causes Jackie to admit she still has romantic feelings for him and the two sleep together. Dunbar offers $2 million to Doug for Claire's journal, which contains the truth about her abortion. She meets privately with Frank and demands that he drop out of the race, but Frank is unfazed and denies the journal's existence. To demonstrate his loyalty, Doug burns the page of the journal which could incriminate Claire in front of Frank as they meet and insists there are no copies. He asks to fill the vacant Chief of Staff position, which Frank accepts, although Claire is disappointed in Frank for not choosing to discuss the matter with her privately beforehand. Claire later indicates doubts about their marriage and mutual trust after Frank says that her decision to resign the ambassadorship was entirely her own.
39	13	"Chapter 39"	James Foley	Beau Willimon	February 27, 2015	HOC-313
Having tracked down Gavin, Doug flies to Caracas and beats him into revealing the whereabouts of Rachel, who is holding two jobs and has bought documents to change her identity. Doug buys a van and supplies, stalks Rachel, abducts her, and ties her up in the back of the van. Rachel apologizes to Doug, explaining she wishes she could take back her actions and claiming she was relieved when she heard he was alive. In a remote location, Doug informs Rachel that he intends to kill her painlessly, but Rachel reveals her new identity and begs to be spared. Doug feels compelled to release Rachel, but quickly realizes that the risk is too great, turns back to kill her, and buries her in the desert. After campaigning in Iowa, Claire asks Frank for rough sex; he cannot do it and recommends that she return to Washington. Claire invites Yates to the White House to talk, and he reveals what she said to him while giving blood. Frank wins the Iowa vote, giving his victory speech alone. When he returns, Claire complains to Frank that she feels they are no longer equals and that she has become subordinate to him. Frank becomes irate and tells her that without him she is nothing, violently demanding that she go to New Hampshire and campaign with him as the First Lady should. The next morning she tells him she is leaving him.

== Reception ==
=== Critical response ===
The third season has received positive reviews from critics. On Metacritic, the season has a score of 76 out of 100, based on 24 critics, indicating "generally favorable" reviews. On Rotten Tomatoes, the season has a rating of 73%, based on 56 reviews, with an average rating of 7/10. The site's consensus reads, "Season three introduces intriguing new political and personal elements to Frank Underwood's character, even if it feels like more of the same for some."

=== Accolades ===
For the 67th Primetime Emmy Awards, the series received nominations for Outstanding Drama Series, Kevin Spacey for Outstanding Lead Actor in a Drama Series, Robin Wright for Outstanding Lead Actress in a Drama Series, and Michael Kelly for Outstanding Supporting in a Drama Series. For the 67th Primetime Creative Arts Emmy Awards, Reg E. Cathey won for Outstanding Guest Actor in a Drama Series, Rachel Brosnahan was nominated for Outstanding Guest Actress in a Drama Series, and Jeff Beal won for Outstanding Music Composition for a Series.

For the 22nd Screen Actors Guild Awards, the cast was nominated for Best Drama Ensemble, Kevin Spacey won for Best Drama Actor, and Robin Wright was nominated for Best Drama Actress. For the 73rd Golden Globe Awards, Robin Wright was nominated for Best Drama Actress.

== Home media ==
The third season was released on DVD and Blu-ray in region 1 on July 7, 2015, and in region 2 on June 29, 2015.
