= Riverdale season 2 =

Riverdale
- Season 2
- Home media cover
- Starring: KJ Apa; Lili Reinhart; Camila Mendes; Cole Sprouse; Marisol Nichols; Madelaine Petsch; Ashleigh Murray; Mark Consuelos; Casey Cott; Skeet Ulrich; Mädchen Amick; Luke Perry
- No. of episodes: 22

Release
- Original network: The CW
- Original release: October 11, 2017 – May 16, 2018

Season chronology
- ← Previous; Season 1 Next → Season 3

The second season of Riverdale premiered on The CW on October 11, 2017 and concluded on May 16, 2018 with a total of 22 episodes. The series is based on the characters from the Archie Comics, created by Maurice Coyne, Louis Silberkleit, and John L. Goldwater, and was created by Roberto Aguirre-Sacasa.

The principal cast sees KJ Apa, Lili Reinhart, Camila Mendes, Cole Sprouse, Marisol Nichols, Madelaine Petsch, Ashleigh Murray, Mädchen Amick and Luke Perry returning from the previous season, and introduces Mark Consuelos, Casey Cott, and Skeet Ulrich in starring roles. The season centres around a shooter known as "The Black Hood" who terrorizes the citizens of Riverdale.

== Episodes ==
No. overall	No. in season	Title	Directed by	Written by	Original release date	Prod. code	US viewers (millions)
14	1	"Chapter Fourteen: A Kiss Before Dying"	Rob Seidenglanz	Roberto Aguirre-Sacasa	October 11, 2017	T13.20801	2.34
After being shot, Fred is rushed to the hospital by Archie, who is soon joined by his friends. Sheriff Keller gains a description of the shooter from Archie and calls him in for a lineup, but none of the men in the lineup are the shooter. When Veronica searches Fred's belongings, Archie sees that his wallet is missing. Betty and Jughead visit Pop's to look for the wallet but find nothing; instead, they learn from Pop that the shooter did not take any money from the register, meaning that it was actually a hit against Fred. Jughead asks the Southside Serpents to investigate the shooting, but to no avail. Veronica accuses Hermione of hiring a hitman to kill Fred, but she vehemently denies this and tensions develop between them when Veronica is not sure her mother is telling the truth. Meanwhile, Cheryl intimidates Penelope—who suffered severe burns due to the fire at their mansion and is hospitalized—into lying that it was an accident. Fred survives his shooting. Hiram returns to Riverdale, further escalating the tensions in the Lodge family. In the nearby town of Greendale, Ms. Grundy is strangled to death by Fred's shooter.
15	2	"Chapter Fifteen: Nighthawks"	Allison Anders	Michael Grassi	October 18, 2017	T13.20802	1.76
After learning of Ms. Grundy's murder, an increasingly anxious Archie suspects that her death is connected with Fred's shooting, which pushes him to get a gun from Dilton Doiley. Following the shooting, business at Pop's Chock'lit Shoppe has declined, leading Pop to consider selling the diner, but Betty convinces Pop to let her throw a retro fun night to drum up business. Jughead learns that F. P. is facing 20 years in prison and seeks help from Penny Peabody, a Serpent lawyer, who advises Jughead to ask the Blossoms to testify on F. P.'s behalf. Cheryl initially refuses, but relents when Betty extorts her with the video of Jason's murder. With Cheryl's testimony, the judge decides to revisit F. P.'s sentence. Hiram quietly buys the diner from Pop, but tells Veronica he made a "charitable donation". In the woods, Moose Mason and Midge Klump take some jingle jangle (a new drug to Riverdale), and as they do so, they are shot by Fred's shooter.
16	3	"Chapter Sixteen: The Watcher in the Woods"	Kevin Sullivan	Ross Maxwell	October 25, 2017	T13.20803	1.62
Kevin, who was in the forest, hears the gunshots and rushes to find Midge crying. Moose, who shielded Midge from the gunfire, is hospitalized and survives. Following the incident, Archie founds a vigilante group called the Red Circle, to protect Riverdale High students. The Coopers receive a letter from "the Black Hood", taking responsibility for the shootings and the murder of Ms. Grundy, and detailing his intentions to target sinners. Polly leaves town, fearing for her babies. Meanwhile, Jughead begins his tenure at Southside High, befriends Toni Topaz, a Serpent, and refounds the school newspaper, the Red and Black, under the advisory of English teacher Robert Philips. Kevin keeps going out late at night, which concerns Betty. Betty follows him on one of his runs, which leads to him lashing out at her. Hiram tells Archie that he should utilize the Black Hood's main weapons for the Red Circle. Inspired by this, the Red Circle makes a video calling out the Black Hood.
17	4	"Chapter Seventeen: The Town That Dreaded Sundown"	Jason Stone	Amanda Lasher	November 1, 2017	T13.20804	1.51
Archie's viral video results in negative repercussions, as Principal Waldo Weatherbee demands he disband the Red Circle. Though Archie refuses, the Red Circle disbands regardless due to the football team being suspended but later reassembles with Veronica's help. Archie runs into trouble when he vandalizes the Serpent's territory with Red Circle graffiti. Veronica finds out that Archie intends to murder the Black Hood and convinces him to discard his gun. Betty receives a letter from the Black Hood, revealing that her speech from the jubilee ball inspired his actions and gives her a cipher that only she could solve. Mayor Sierra McCoy (Josie's mother) hosts a town meeting to discuss action against the Black Hood, in which Alice blames the Serpents, but Fred argues against letting fear rule them. Betty and Jughead figure out that the Black Hood intends to attack town hall and have the meeting evacuated, before showing the letter to her parents, Sheriff Keller and Mayor McCoy. Later, Betty receives a call from the Black Hood.
18	5	"Chapter Eighteen: When a Stranger Calls"	Ellen Pressman	Aaron Allen	November 8, 2017	T13.20805	1.47
The Black Hood reveals to Betty that he knows where Polly is and threatens to kill her unless she publishes a mugshot of Alice, which she does. Hiram invites the St. Clairs, friends of the Lodges from New York. On the Southside, Jughead attempts to stop Sweet Pea and the Serpents from blowing up the Riverdale Register office and joins the gang to prevent this from happening. The Black Hood forces Betty to cut ties with Veronica and Jughead and later gives her a hood. At the Lodge's open house event, Nick St. Clair drugs Cheryl and takes her back to his hotel room to rape her, but is stopped and beaten by Veronica and the Pussycats. Jughead and Toni sit in his trailer, where he tells her his relationship with Betty is over; they kiss. Back at Betty's house, the Black Hood tells her she has broken the rules and he will now kill Polly unless she gives him the name of a "sinner" to kill, to which Betty names Nick St. Clair.
19	6	"Chapter Nineteen: Death Proof"	Maggie Kiley	Tessa Leigh Williams & Arabella Anderson	November 15, 2017	T13.20806	1.43
The Black Hood challenges Betty to find the identity of The Sugarman, who has been supplying the jingle jangle to Riverdale. Cheryl wants to press charges against Nick, whom the Black Hood did not attack, but Penelope agrees not to in exchange for money from the St. Clairs. Archie goes to Southside High, where he saves Jughead from a raid organized by McCoy and Sheriff Keller. Tall Boy, F. P.'s right hand man, reaches an agreement with the Ghoulies, the dealers of jingle jangle. Jughead and Archie visit F. P., who tells Jughead to challenge the Ghoulies to a race. During the race, Archie pulls the brake on Jughead's car, and reveals he called Sheriff Keller, who arrests the Ghoulies' leader. Veronica convinces Hiram and Hermione to stop investing with the St. Clairs, while Cheryl does the same with Penelope. Later, the Lodges receive a call that the St. Clairs have been run off the road, but will recover in months. Penelope reveals to Cheryl that the Sugarman is Robert Philips; Cheryl later tells Betty, who exposes him in the Blue and Gold. Philips is subsequently arrested, and then shot by the Black Hood while in jail.
20	7	"Chapter Twenty: Tales from the Darkside"	Dawn Wilkinson	James DeWille	November 29, 2017	T13.20807	1.45
After killing Phillips, the Black Hood leaves a letter at Pop's challenging Riverdale to go 48 hours without sinning or he will kill again. Jughead is enlisted by Penny Peabody to deliver a crate of drugs to repay her for her earlier help, which he does with Archie. She says this is a one-time thing, but Jughead later finds she was lying. Josie begins to receive weird messages from a secret admirer, implied to be Cheryl, including a box with a pig's heart. Melody and Valerie leave her in the process. Mayor McCoy reprimands her for coming home late, revealing she has received death threats. Betty, realizing that Phillips was killed in the sheriff's office, believes Sheriff Keller might be the Black Hood. She investigates, but Keller is able to provide proof that he is not the Black Hood. However, Betty and Veronica discover that he is having an affair with Mayor McCoy. Archie, Jughead, Betty, Veronica, Josie, and Cheryl all gather at Pop's. After Jughead leaves to visit F. P., the Black Hood calls Pop to inform him Riverdale failed his challenge and Pop grimly announces that "The reckoning is upon us."
21	8	"Chapter Twenty-One: House of the Devil"	Kevin Sullivan	Yolonda Lawrence	December 6, 2017	T13.20808	1.48
F. P. is released from jail and begins working at Pop's, intending to quit the Serpents. Jughead and Betty decide to throw F. P. a "retirement" party at the Whyte Worm, so they enlist Archie and Veronica to do the detective work. While Jughead reconnects with his dad, Betty goes to the Whyte Worm to organize the party. There, she meets Toni and tells her she wants to keep watch over Jughead. Archie and Veronica follow a lead on a past serial killer called the Riverdale Reaper, who murdered a family of four before being killed himself by a lynch mob. Their investigation leads them to discover there was a fifth member of the family, the school's janitor Joseph Svenson. Archie and Veronica confront Svenson, but decide he is not the Black Hood. At the party, F. P., who is upset that Jughead helped Peabody, decides to stay with the Serpents. Outside, Veronica breaks up with Archie following a discussion about love. Jughead, not wanting to bring Betty into the Serpents' business, also ends their relationship.
22	9	"Chapter Twenty-Two: Silent Night, Deadly Night"	Rob Seidenglanz	Shepard Boucher	December 13, 2017	T13.20809	1.43
Fred receives a hospital bill of $86,000. Failing to convince her parents to help Fred, Veronica sneaks into Hiram's study and finds out that he bought Pop's. She later convinces him and Hermione to stop keeping secrets from her and help Fred. Jughead rallies the younger Serpents, who kidnap Peabody and cut out her Serpent tattoo. Betty and Archie receive a box from the Black Hood, containing Svenson's severed finger. They then receive a call from the Black Hood, who challenges them to find Svenson. They are able to find Svenson's location, but instead find an empty coffin. The Black Hood then appears and tries to force Betty into burying Archie alive, but flees when the police arrive. After a chase, Keller shoots and kills the Black Hood before he can escape. The Black Hood is then revealed to be Svenson himself. Later, with the Black Hood dead, Veronica and Archie get back together, while Betty throws away all of her findings surrounding Svenson, but keeps the hood he gave her earlier.
23	10	"Chapter Twenty-Three: The Blackboard Jungle"	Tim Hunter	Britta Lundin & Brian E. Paterson	January 17, 2018	T13.20810	1.44
The Lodges strike a land deal with Mayor McCoy which involves shutting down Southside High, causing Jughead, Toni, Sweet Pea, and the other Serpents to transfer to Riverdale High, putting them at odds with the other students. Archie is approached by FBI Agent Adams, who wants his help finding proof of Hiram's criminal dealings. Archie agrees to help in exchange for immunity for Veronica and Fred. Archie investigates Nick, who implies that Hiram was behind his car crash, which broke both of his legs. Despite Hal's objections, Betty and Alice track down Alice's son Chic whom she gave up for adoption. Chic initially refuses to come with them, but Betty returns to his residence and saves him from an assault, bringing him to the Cooper household. Jughead, following advice from F.P., gets his fellow Serpents to lie low. Archie reveals to Adams that he secretly doubts Svenson was really the Black Hood. That night, Chic lurks in Betty's room while she sleeps.
24	11	"Chapter Twenty-Four: The Wrestler"	Gregg Araki	Greg Murray & Devon Turner	January 24, 2018	T13.20811	1.39
Pickens' Day, a day in remembrance of Riverdale's founder, nears. Archie tries out for the wrestling team in order to impress Hiram, a former wrestler. Betty learns that Chic is a webcam model and attempts to reach out to him. Jughead interviews Toni's grandfather for a school project, learning that he is a member of a Native American tribe that was slaughtered by Pickens. Jughead publishes the story, escalating tensions between the two sides. At the Pickens' Day fest, the Serpents protest the event, but Hiram spins their words positively. That night, Archie meets with Hiram, who offers him his business tutelage, which Archie accepts. The next morning, Mayor McCoy, Sheriff Keller, and the Lodges meet at the statue of Pickens, which has been decapitated.
25	12	"Chapter Twenty-Five: The Wicked and the Divine"	Rachel Talalay	Roberto Aguirre-Sacasa	January 31, 2018	T13.20812	1.34
Veronica's confirmation nears, bringing many Lodge family members and business associates to Riverdale. While serving at a poker game with Hiram and his associates, Archie learns that Hiram is a mobster and his associates are planning his 'removal' after Veronica's confirmation. Archie alerts Hiram to this and Hiram later arranges that mobster's death. Meanwhile, Mayor McCoy orchestrates the eviction of all the Serpents from their trailer park. Jughead and Betty are alerted to the location of the Pickens head by a scrapyard owner who gives them evidence that Tall Boy decapitated the statue. Jughead and F. P. put Tall Boy on trial, where he reveals that Hiram assisted him in launching a mutiny so that Tall Boy could remove F. P. and Jughead from the Serpents. Betty and Jughead get back together. A strange man comes to the Cooper house asking for Chic. Later, Betty returns home to find Alice cleaning up the man's blood.
26	13	"Chapter Twenty-Six: The Tell-Tale Heart"	Julie Plec	Michael Grassi	February 7, 2018	T13.20813	1.28
Betty and Alice clean up the man's body and dispose of it with help from F.P. and Jughead. Jughead sends the Pickens statue's head to the Lodges, which Hiram believes may be a declaration of war. Mayor McCoy attempts to take control of her deal with the Lodges and the Lodges prepare to expose her affair with Sheriff Keller. Veronica, however, warns her of this and McCoy resigns from office. Agent Adams tries to strong-arm Archie into giving him information, including blackmailing Archie to plant a bug in Hiram's office. Archie instead reveals this to Hiram. Hiram's driver takes Archie to a private location to meet with "the boss," revealed to be Hermione. Hermione tells Archie that Adams is actually one of the Lodges' capos and it was a test, which Archie has passed. Hermione welcomes him to the family.
27	14	"Chapter Twenty-Seven: The Hills Have Eyes"	David Katzenberg	Ross Maxwell	March 7, 2018	T13.20814	1.26
Hiram suggests Archie, Veronica, Betty, and Jughead go to the Lodges' lake house for a romantic getaway. Cheryl, upset over not being invited, calls Jughead and informs him of Betty's kiss with Archie, causing tension within the group. Veronica and Jughead kiss to "level the playing field." Later, the girls go into town while the guys have a discussion over the close mutual bonds between the four. Back in Riverdale, Josie informs Kevin of their parents' affair. Cheryl reveals to Toni that she had a friendship-turned-lesbian-relationship broken up by Penelope. At the lake house, tensions return when Jughead and Betty learn that Hiram bought the trailer park and the Riverdale Register. A group of men with whom Veronica interacted in town break into the house, but Veronica activates a silent alarm. One of Hiram's men arrives and kills one of the intruders before the four return to Riverdale.
28	15	"Chapter Twenty-Eight: There Will Be Blood"	Mark Piznarski	Aaron Allen	March 14, 2018	T13.20815	1.19
Jughead keeps investigating the Lodges' plans, but he cannot use what he finds. Hiram and Hermione want Fred to run for mayor and offer to finance his run. Hal asks Alice for a divorce and Polly comes back to Riverdale. Clifford's secret will is read, which entitles money to anyone of Blossom blood. Clifford's twin brother Claudius returns. When Chic refuses the DNA test, Betty steals his dental floss to do her own test and discovers that Chic is not who he says he is. After Smithers points Jughead to Shankshaw Prison, F. P.'s inside contact allows them to learn the truth about the Lodges' plans: they want to turn Southside High into a private prison and the housing Fred is building will be for the employees of the prison. After the Lodges are forced to tell Fred, he refuses to run for Mayor, so Hermione announces her run instead. Archie undergoes a blood ritual with Hiram, pledging loyalty. Meanwhile, Claudius and Penelope plot to get their house "in order," including Nana and Cheryl, who overhears the plan.
29	16	"Chapter Twenty-Nine: Primary Colors"	Sherwin Shilati	James DeWille	March 21, 2018	T13.20816	1.16
Jughead learns Southside High will be turned into a prison and goes on a hunger strike to protest. Hiram accelerates the timeline for demolition, but the high school Serpents chain themselves to the school. Fred attempts to end his contract with the Lodges, leading to a legal dispute. Hiram asks Archie to cut the Serpents' chains, which Archie does in exchange for Fred being released from his contract. Betty learns Hal is not Chic's father. Penelope and Claudius attempt to kill Nana Rose, but she survives. Veronica runs for student president, but everyone seems to be against her. Jughead also considers running with Betty. Betty moves in with Jughead to avoid Chic. Cheryl tells Penelope she knows what she did, leading Penelope to get Cheryl committed. Free of his contract with the Lodges, Fred announces he is running for mayor against Hermione.
30	17	"Chapter Thirty: The Noose Tightens"	Alexis Ostrander	Britta Lundin & Brian E. Paterson	March 28, 2018	T13.20817	0.96
Hermione's run for mayor is considered risky by fellow mobsters Kowalski and Martin, who believe it may lead to unwanted investigation. They demand a 25% cut of the prison's profits, which Hiram refuses. Kowalski and Martin, however, convince Hiram's capo Adams to hospitalize Andre, leaving the Lodges shorthanded on security. Archie scares the two into abandoning the deal with the help of Reggie and other Riverdale athletes. Meanwhile, the car belonging to the man Chic killed is found. The owner of the car demands $10,000 from the Coopers to prevent her from going to the police, but Jughead and the Serpents scare her away. Alice sends Chic away and apologizes to the Serpents for her years of badmouthing them. Toni and Veronica discover that Cheryl has been admitted into conversion therapy and, with help from Nana Rose, they find out that she is at the Sisters of Quiet Mercy. Toni, Veronica, and Kevin rescue Cheryl and Toni and Cheryl kiss. Cheryl soon returns to Riverdale High, which she declares 'will burn.'
31	18	"Chapter Thirty-One: A Night to Remember"	Jason Stone	Arabella Anderson & Tessa Leigh Williams	April 18, 2018	T13.20818	1.10
During a rehearsal of Riverdale High's musical production of Carrie, Cheryl calls out those who question her ability to play the lead role of Carrie White by demonstrating her singing ability. After rehearsal, Kevin confides in Jughead that he received several threats demanding that the role of Carrie be recast, supposedly from the Black Hood. Kevin gives in and Midge replaces Cheryl as Carrie. Tensions arise between Archie and Fred after he finds out that Hiram bought Archie his first car, resulting in Archie warning Hiram not to get between him and his father. Cheryl, doused in blood, confronts her mother for her actions against the family and demands that she be emancipated. During the performance, a set wall is moved up to reveal Midge hung up to the wall with knives, murdered by the Black Hood with a warning of his return.
32	19	"Chapter Thirty-Two: Prisoners"	Jennifer Phang	Cristine Chambers	April 25, 2018	T13.20819	1.17
Following Midge's funeral, her mother, Cheryl, and the River Vixens blame Sheriff Keller for her death, causing him to consider resigning. Archie is abducted by Nick St. Clair, who demands a ransom from the Lodges. With her parents unwilling to pay and lacking the money herself, Veronica pretends to surrender herself to Nick, but drugs him. Archie manages to escape and they hold Nick for ransom instead. Meanwhile, Betty and Jughead investigate Chic and learn from the Sisters of the Quiet Mercy that he is an impostor, resulting in his imprisonment. Betty is secretly contacted by the Black Hood, who offers to get rid of Chic. Betty gets Chic to confess that he murdered her real brother, Charles, by accident and then hands him over to the Black Hood, leaving him to die. Betty lies to Alice and says that Chic left town of his own accord, then learns that Hal was absent at the time of the exchange, leading her to suspect him of being the Black Hood.
33	20	"Chapter Thirty-Three: Shadow of a Doubt"	Gregory Smith	Yolanda E. Lawrence	May 2, 2018	T13.20820	1.11
Betty tells Cheryl that she believes Hal is the Black Hood. Hiram restarts The Red Circle in hopes of causing unrest and to help Hermione's campaign. Moose reveals that Midge was having an affair with Fangs. A body, first thought to be Chic's, is found and Betty reveals she feels guilty for his presumed death. Fangs is arrested at school. Members of The Red Circle damage The Whyte Worm and Reggie later reveals that Hiram is playing them against each other. Betty and Cheryl visit a room being paid for by Hal and find the same book used as a cipher previously. After the Black Hood attacks the Mayoral debate, Veronica wants her mother to stop running, but she insists on continuing. Betty confronts her father and arranges a meeting with him later. The Black Hood then appears at Cheryl's door. Fangs is released from prison, but is shot amidst the protesters outside.
34	21	"Chapter Thirty-Four: Judgment Night"	Cherie Nowlan	Shepard Boucher	May 9, 2018	T13.20821	1.00
The Black Hood attacks Cheryl, but she wounds him with a bow and arrow. Reggie is accused of being Fangs' shooter, but it is later revealed to be Midge's mother. Veronica finds out that Hiram planned to reveal Hermione's affair with Fred, but Hermione reveals her involvement, as it would destroy Fred's campaign. The son of the mobster whose death Hiram arranged attacks the Lodges, killing Andre, but Hermione shoots him dead. The Ghoulies are released from prison and attack Pop's. Meanwhile, Hal reveals himself as the Black Hood to Betty and Alice. After admitting he did not attack the debate, he is subdued by Betty and arrested. Fred, who is wearing a bullet proof vest, is shot by a man in a black hood and Betty and Archie realize the man was not Hal. Penny Peabody resurfaces and holds Toni captive, but Jughead and Cheryl help her escape. F. P. alerts the Serpents of Fangs' death and the Serpents decide to fight the Ghoulies. Jughead turns himself over to avoid bloodshed, but Penny breaks her promise and the Ghoulies attack Jughead. Learning of this, F. P. goes to save him. Later, Archie, Cheryl, Betty, and the Serpents find F. P. carrying Jughead's bloodied, unconscious body.
35	22	"Chapter Thirty-Five: Brave New World"	Steven A. Adelson	Roberto Aguirre-Sacasa	May 16, 2018	T13.20822	1.28
Jughead survives his assault and F. P. reveals Fangs is alive. Sheriff Minetta reveals the second Black Hood to be Tall Boy, who was killed by an officer. Cheryl discovers Penelope and Claudius meeting with Hiram and informs Veronica, who reveals this to Hermione. Hermione, believing it to be conceivable that Hiram planned the attack at the debate, reveals to Veronica that Hiram plans to consolidate the entire Southside, and needs the Whyte Wyrm to set his plan fully into motion. Jughead, Archie, and Cheryl lead the Serpents to the Northside, where they are offered asylum. Veronica buys the Wyrm, and trades it with Hiram for Pop's. F. P. retires from the Serpents, naming Jughead the new King, with Cheryl joining the Serpents. Hermione wins the mayoral election. Later, Hiram meets with Penny, Penelope, Claudius, Sheriff Minetta, and Malachi, to discuss joining forces. Archie is elected student body president, but is wrongfully arrested by Sheriff Minetta during his inauguration for the murder of one of the intruders from the lake house that one of Hiram's thugs killed.

== Cast and characters ==
=== Main ===
- KJ Apa as Archie Andrews, the main protagonist of the series, a high school football player and musician trying to uncover the identity of the serial killer the Black Hood who shot and injured his father.
- Lili Reinhart as Betty Cooper, Archie and Veronica's best friend and Jughead's girlfriend who helps Archie uncover the identity of the Black Hood.
- Camila Mendes as Veronica Lodge, Archie's girlfriend, Hiram and Hermione's daughter and Jughead and Betty's best friend who also tries to help uncover the Black Hood's identity.
- Cole Sprouse as Jughead Jones, Archie and Veronica's best friend, Betty's boyfriend and the leader of the biker gang the Southside Serpents who tries to help defeat the Ghoulies and Hiram Lodge.
- Marisol Nichols as Hermione Lodge, Veronica's mother, Hiram's wife and the co-owner of Lodge Industries who helps in her husband's criminal activities.
- Madelaine Petsch as Cheryl Blossom, Penelope and Clifford's daughter, Nana Rose's granddaughter, Betty's second cousin and the leader of the Riverdale cheerleading squad the River Vixens.
- Ashleigh Murray as Josie McCoy, the lead singer for the Josie and the Pussycats and Cheryl's best friend.
- Mark Consuelos as Hiram Lodge, a gangster, mob don, drug dealer, Veronica's father and Hermione's husband who tries to help criminalize Riverdale and is the main antagonist of the season.
- Casey Cott as Kevin Keller, Betty's other gay best friend who loves cruising through Fox Forest.
- Skeet Ulrich as FP Jones, Jughead's father, a drug dealer and leader of the Southside Serpents who tries to save them and help defeat the Ghoulies.
- Mädchen Amick as Alice Cooper, Betty and Polly's mother, Hal's wife and the co-owner and journalist for The Register who had previously dated FP in high school.
- Luke Perry as Fred Andrews, Archie's father, Mary's husband and the owner of Andrews Construction Company who is shot and injured at the start of the season by the Black Hood at Pop's and tries to find out the killer's identity.

=== Recurring ===
- Lochlyn Munro as Hal Cooper, Betty and Polly's father, Alice's husband and the owner of The Register who tries to apologize to the family for his actions last season.
- Martin Cummins as Sheriff Tom Keller, Kevin's father and the sheriff of Riverdale who tries to uncover the identity of the Black Hood.
- Vanessa Morgan as Toni Topaz, a member of the Southside Serpents who becomes Jughead's best friend at Southside High.
- Nathalie Boltt as Penelope Blossom, the deceased Clifford's former wife, Claudius's sister-in-law, Nana Rose's daughter-in-law and Cheryl's mother who becomes a prostitute.
- Charles Melton as Reggie Mantle, Riverdale's town prankster, the Captain of the Bulldogs and Archie's frenemy who is also secretly a drug dealer and connected with Hiram.
- Jordan Connor as Sweet Pea, an arrogant and loyal member of the Southside Serpents who becomes Jughead's friend and the Northside Bulldogs' rival.
- Robin Givens as Sierra McCoy, Josie's mother and the Mayor of Riverdale who hates the Southside.
- Alvin Sanders as Pop Tate, the kindly and aging owner of Pop's Chocke-Litte Shoppe who helps the main characters.
- Drew Ray Tanner as Fangs Fogarty, a secretly bisexual member of the Southside Serpents and Sweet Pea's best friend and right-hand man with hatred towards the Northside and the Bulldogs.
- Cody Kearsley as Moose Mason, a secretly bisexual member of the Riverdale Bulldogs, Reggie's best friend and Midge's boyfriend.
- Peter James Bryant as Waldo Weatherbee, the principal of Riverdale High trying to help improve it.
- Hart Denton as Chic, a mysterious hustler who is later revealed to be an imposter posing as Alice and FP's secret son Charles.
- Emilija Baranac as Midge Klump, Moose's girlfriend and a member of the River Vixens who is tailed by the Black Hood throughout the season.
- Scott Mcneil as Gerald Petite "Tall Boy", FP's scheming second-in-command right hand-man in the Southside Serpents.
- Brit Morgan as Penny Peabody, a member of the Southside Serpents who is a scheming, shady and corrupt lawyer.
- Stephan Miers as Andre, Hiram's right-hand man and capo who is also Veronica and Hermione's bodyguard.
- Tiera Skovbye as Polly Cooper, Betty's traumatized sister and Alice and Hal's older daughter who disappears mysteriously.
- Asha Bromfield as Melody Valentine, a member of the Pussycats.
- Barclay Hope as Cliff and Claudius Blossom, the twin brother of Clifford Blossom, Nana Rose's other son, Penelope's brother-in-law, Cheryl's paternal uncle and a drug dealer connected to Hiram, the Kansas City Mafia, Penny Peabody, Tall Boy and the Ghoulies who also tries to own Blossom Maple Syrup.
- Barbara Wallace as Rose Blossom, the aging matriarch of the Blossom family, the deceased Clifford and Claudius's mother, Penelope's mother-in-law and Cheryl's paternal grandmother.
- John Behlmann as Arthur Adams, an FBI agent set up by Hiram to be friends with and secretly investigate Archie.
- Hayley Law as Valerie Brown, the third member of the Pussycats.
- Shannon Purser as Ethel Muggs, a depressed student at Riverdale High and Betty's best friend.
- Beverley Breuer as Sister Woodhouse, the mean and hard-headed nun at the Sisters of Quiet Mercy.
- Moses Thiessen as Ben Button, a Riverdale and Greendale pizza delivery boy having an affair with Miss Grundy/Jennifer Gibson.
- Graham Phillips as Nick St. Clair, a devious, trouble-making rich bad boy from Veronica's past in New York who comes to Riverdale with his family and is disliked by the main characters.

=== Guest ===
- Jordan Calloway as Chuck Clayton, a former slut shamer and former member of the Riverdale Bulldogs who is trying to redeem his old ways.
- Major Curda as Dilton Doiley, the leader of the Riverdale Boy scouts and Archie's confidante.
- Molly Ringwald as Mary Andrews, Archie's mother, Fred's wife and a lawyer from Chicago.
- Cameron McDonald as Joseph Svenson / Conway, a mysterious janitor at Riverdale High hiding a dark past connected to the Black Hood.
- Robyn Ross as Mrs. Klump, Midge's mother
- Henderson Wade as Michael Minetta, the new corrupt sheriff of Riverdale who helps Hiram Lodge.
- Tommy Martinez as Malachai, the leader of the Ghoulies who is also connected to Hiram, the Kansas City Mafia, Penny Peabody, Tall Boy and Claudius Blossom and who faces off against Jughead, Toni, FP, Sweet Pea, Fangs and the Serpents this season.
- Sarah Habel as Geraldine Grundy, the former music teacher of Riverdale High and Archie's former lover who is now living as a music tutor in Greendale and has an intense affair with Ben Button.
- Tom McBeath as Smithers, Veronica and Hermione's former butler at the Pembrooke who is replaced by Andre.
- Rob Raco as Joaquin DeSantos, a member of the Southside Serpents and Kevin's former secret boyfriend.
- Trevor Stines as Jason Blossom, Cheryl's deceased twin brother who died prior to the season and appears in flashbacks alongside her deceased father Clifford.
- Colin Lawrence as Coach Floyd Clayton, the coach and leader of the Riverdale Bulldogs and Chuck's father.
- Kwesi Ameyaw as Dr. Masters, a doctor who attends to the multiple injured characters this season.
- Robert Baker as Robert Phillips, a drug dealer, English teacher at Southside High and editor for the school newspaper The Red and Black who tries to mentor Jughead.
- Mark Brandon as Xander St. Clair, Nick's father, Simone's husband and a friend of the Lodges.
- Michelle Brezinski as Simone St. Clair, Xander's wife, Nick's mother and a friend of the Lodges.
- Tony Todd as McGinty, a farmer from Greendale who briefly runs into Archie and Jughead.
- Graham Greene as Thomas Topaz, Toni's grandfather and a member of the Uktena who knows Riverdale's history.
- Jerry Wasserman as Mr. Lazenby, the executor for the Blossom family estate.
- Azura Skye as Darla, a small-time Riverdale thief who tries to rob the Coopers.
- Beckham Skodje as Hal Cooper (kid)
- M.C. Gainey as Poppa Poutine, a boorish gangster and member of the Kansas City Mafia who is Hiram's associate.

== Production ==
=== Development and writing ===
The series was renewed for a second season on March 7, 2017. Principal photography for the season began in June 2017 in Vancouver. On January 24, 2018, The CW announced the production of a musical episode for the season based on the Stephen Kings classic novel, Carrie. The episode, titled "Chapter Thirty-One: A Night to Remember" was first screened at the PaleyFest LA Spring Season in March 2018 and premiered on The CW on April 18, 2018, receiving positive reviews from critics.

=== Casting ===
On April 25, 2017, ahead of the first season finale, it was announced that Mark Consuelos had joined the cast to play Veronica's father, Hiram Lodge. Consuelos' casting, was in second position due to his co-starring role in the Fox baseball drama series Pitch, but that series was cancelled on May 1. A week later, Charles Melton was cast as Reggie Mantle, replacing Ross Butler, who originated the role during the first season, but left the show altogether due to his commitment as a series regular on 13 Reasons Why. That same day, Casey Cott was promoted to series regular as Kevin Keller.

On July 14, 2017, Brit Morgan of True Blood was cast to portray the recurring character of Penny Peabody. On August 11, 2017, Graham Phillips was cast as Nick St. Clair, Veronica's ex-boyfriend from New York.

== Music ==
Riverdale: Season 2 (Original Television Soundtrack) track listing
No.	Title	Artist(s)	Length
1.	"Milkshake"	Ashleigh Murray, Asha Bromfield and Madelaine Petsch	2:56
2.	"Out Tonight"	Ashleigh Murray, Asha Bromfield, Hayley Law and Camila Mendes	3:47
3.	"Spooky"	Ashleigh Murray	2:40
4.	"Mad World"	KJ Apa, Camila Mendes and Lili Reinhart	3:08
5.	"God Rest You Merry, Gentlemen"	Ashleigh Murray and Casey Cott	2:10
6.	"Union of the Snake"	Camila Mendes, Asha Bromfield and Hayley Law	2:43
7.	"Bitter Sweet Symphony"	Ashleigh Murray and Camila Mendes	4:05
8.	"Sufferin' Till Suffrage"	Ashleigh Murray and Camila Mendes	1:42
9.	"You'll Never Walk Alone"	Madelaine Petsch	1:50

Riverdale: Season 2 (Original Television Score) track listing
No.	Title	Artist(s)	Length
1.	"I Froze - The Black Hood"	Blake Neely and Sherri Chung	3:14
2.	"Code Breaking - Lodge Scheming"	Blake Neely and Sherri Chung	3:06
3.	"Forming the Red Circle"	Blake Neely and Sherri Chung	2:27
4.	"Make Good Decisions"	Blake Neely and Sherri Chung	1:50
5.	"Asking Leniency"	Blake Neely and Sherri Chung	1:41
6.	"Cheryl Committed"	Blake Neely and Sherri Chung	2:24
7.	"I Was in Love Once"	Blake Neely and Sherri Chung	2:22
8.	"Not a Killer"	Blake Neely and Sherri Chung	2:26
9.	"Sent to the Southside"	Blake Neely and Sherri Chung	3:40
10.	"Challenging the Ghoulies"	Blake Neely and Sherri Chung	3:10
11.	"Like Romeo and Juliet"	Blake Neely and Sherri Chung	2:32
12.	"Defeating the Black Hood"	Blake Neely and Sherri Chung	1:56
13.	"Won't Let It Go"	Blake Neely and Sherri Chung	1:41
14.	"Less Pony, More Snake - You Broke My Heart"	Blake Neely and Sherri Chung	2:16
15.	"Dangerous Game"	Blake Neely and Sherri Chung	3:04
16.	"Double Breakup"	Blake Neely and Sherri Chung	2:30
17.	"Quiet the Darkness Inside"	Blake Neely and Sherri Chung	2:49
18.	"Everything Falls Apart"	Blake Neely and Sherri Chung	2:28
19.	"Or You Could Stay"	Blake Neely and Sherri Chung	3:11
20.	"Darkness Begins to Fall"	Blake Neely and Sherri Chung	2:54
21.	"Truth About Being Mayor"	Blake Neely and Sherri Chung	2:45
22.	"The Cabin"	Blake Neely and Sherri Chung	2:14
23.	"Challenging Hiram"	Blake Neely and Sherri Chung	1:19
24.	"Just When You Felt Safe"	Blake Neely and Sherri Chung	3:14
25.	"Archie Held Captive"	Blake Neely and Sherri Chung	2:16
26.	"Conclusions"	Blake Neely and Sherri Chung	2:41
27.	"New Serpent King"	Blake Neely and Sherri Chung	2:14
28.	"I'll Never Be Like You"	Blake Neely and Sherri Chung	1:49
29.	"A Better Tomorrow"	Blake Neely and Sherri Chung	3:23
30.	"Hiram's Master Plan"	Blake Neely and Sherri Chung	3:39
31.	"Foolish Question"	Blake Neely and Sherri Chung	2:14

== Release ==
The first trailer for the season was screened at the 2017 San Diego Comic-Con on July 22, 2017. The season premiered on The CW on October 11, 2017 and ended on May 16, 2018. The season debuted on Netflix in the United States on May 24, 2018, 8 days after the season ended its official broadcast on The CW; for Netflix in Latin America, the complete season became available on October 11, 2018, a year after it originally premiered in the U.S. The season was released on DVD & Blu-Ray by Warner Bros. on August 7, 2018.

== Home media ==
The Complete Second Season was officially released on DVD in region 1 on August 7, 2018, by Warner Bros. Entertainment Inc. For region 2, it was released on August 20. The season was also released on Blu-ray for region A on August 7 by Warner Archives.

Riverdale: The Complete Second Season
Set Details		Special Features
22 episodes; 4-disc set; English (5.1 Dolby Digital); English SDH subtitles; Runtime: 932 minutes		5 All-New Featurettes: Riverdale Vocal Warm-Ups; Caught Between Two Worlds: The Darkness Inside; The Musical Riverdale; Riverdale Pop Quiz!; Riverdale: 2017 Comic-Con Panel; Deleted Scenes; Gag Reel
Release Dates
Region 1	Region 2	Region 4
August 7, 2018	August 20, 2018	October 17, 2018

== Reception ==
=== Critical response ===
On review aggregator website Rotten Tomatoes, the second season holds an approval rating of 88% based on 15 reviews, and an average rating of 7.61/10. The site's critics consensus reads: "Riverdale enters its sophomore year with an off-kilter new murder mystery while continuing to up the hormonal teen melodrama."

=== Ratings ===
Viewership and ratings per episode of Riverdale season 2
No.	Title	Air date	Rating/share (18–49)	Viewers (millions)	DVR (18–49)	DVR viewers (millions)	Total (18–49)	Total viewers (millions)
1	"Chapter Fourteen: A Kiss Before Dying"	October 11, 2017	0.8/3	2.34	0.6	1.40	1.4	3.74
2	"Chapter Fifteen: Nighthawks"	October 18, 2017	0.6/2	1.76	0.6	1.34	1.2	3.10
3	"Chapter Sixteen: The Watcher in the Woods"	October 25, 2017	0.6/2	1.62	0.6	1.32	1.2	2.94
4	"Chapter Seventeen: The Town That Dreaded Sundown"	November 1, 2017	0.6/2	1.51	0.5	1.30	1.1	2.80
5	"Chapter Eighteen: When a Stranger Calls"	November 8, 2017	0.5/2	1.47	0.5	1.23	1.0	2.70
6	"Chapter Nineteen: Death Proof"	November 15, 2017	0.5/2	1.43	0.5	1.23	1.0	2.66
7	"Chapter Twenty: Tales from the Darkside"	November 29, 2017	0.5/2	1.45	0.5	1.19	1.0	2.64
8	"Chapter Twenty-One: House of the Devil"	December 6, 2017	0.5/2	1.48	0.6	1.20	1.1	2.68
9	"Chapter Twenty-Two: Silent Night, Deadly Night"	December 13, 2017	0.5/2	1.43	—N/a	—N/a	—N/a	—N/a
10	"Chapter Twenty-Three: The Blackboard Jungle"	January 17, 2018	0.5/2	1.44	0.5	1.14	1.0	2.59
11	"Chapter Twenty-Four: The Wrestler"	January 24, 2018	0.5/2	1.39	0.5	1.15	1.0	2.54
12	"Chapter Twenty-Five: The Wicked and the Divine"	January 31, 2018	0.5/2	1.34	0.5	1.06	1.0	2.40
13	"Chapter Twenty-Six: The Tell-Tale Heart"	February 7, 2018	0.5/2	1.28	0.4	0.96	0.9	2.24
14	"Chapter Twenty-Seven: The Hills Have Eyes"	March 7, 2018	0.5/2	1.26	0.4	0.95	0.9	2.22
15	"Chapter Twenty-Eight: There Will Be Blood"	March 14, 2018	0.4/2	1.19	0.4	0.91	0.8	2.10
16	"Chapter Twenty-Nine: Primary Colors"	March 21, 2018	0.4/2	1.16	0.4	0.94	0.8	2.10
17	"Chapter Thirty: The Noose Tightens"	March 28, 2018	0.3/1	0.96	0.4	0.91	0.7	1.87
18	"Chapter Thirty-One: A Night to Remember"	April 18, 2018	0.4/2	1.10	0.3	0.83	0.7	1.93
19	"Chapter Thirty-Two: Prisoners"	April 25, 2018	0.4/2	1.17	0.4	0.81	0.8	1.97
20	"Chapter Thirty-Three: Shadow of a Doubt"	May 2, 2018	0.4/2	1.11	0.4	0.93	0.8	2.04
21	"Chapter Thirty-Four: Judgment Night"	May 9, 2018	0.4/2	1.00	0.3	0.90	0.7	1.91
22	"Chapter Thirty-Five: Brave New World"	May 16, 2018	0.4/2	1.28	0.4	0.76	0.8	2.04
