= List of Chilling Adventures of Sabrina episodes =

Chilling Adventures of Sabrina is an American supernatural horror web television series developed by Roberto Aguirre-Sacasa for Netflix, based on the Archie Horror comic book series of the same name. The series is produced by Warner Bros. Television, in association with Berlanti Productions and Archie Comics. Aguirre-Sacasa and Greg Berlanti serve as executive producers, alongside Sarah Schechter, Jon Goldwater, and Lee Toland Krieger.

On July 8, 2020, Netflix cancelled the series. During the course of the series, 36 episodes of Chilling Adventures of Sabrina were released over four parts, between October 26, 2018, and December 31, 2020.

== Series overview ==
| Part | Season | Episodes | | Originally released |
|---|---|---|---|---|
| 1 | 1 | 11 | 10 | October 26, 2018 |
| 1 | 1 | 11 | 1 | December 14, 2018 |
| 2 | 1 | 9 | | April 5, 2019 |
| 3 | 2 | 8 | | January 24, 2020 |
| 4 | 2 | 8 | | December 31, 2020 |

== Episodes ==
=== Part 1 (2018) ===
| No. overall | No. in part | Title | Directed by | Written by | Original release date |
|---|---|---|---|---|---|
| 1 | 1 | "Chapter One: October Country" | Lee Toland Krieger | Roberto Aguirre-Sacasa | October 26, 2018 |
Sabrina Spellman is about to turn 16 on Halloween. She spends her days hanging out with her boyfriend Harvey and her best friends Roz and Susie. However, on her 16th birthday, she must fully embrace her witch half through a dark baptism, where she will pledge loyalty to the Dark Lord Satan. But Sabrina is torn, as she must choose between her friends and her family. Sabrina spends the days leading up to her birthday finding answers to her questions about the ritual. Meanwhile, Sabrina's mortal teacher, Mary Wardwell, is killed by Madam Satan, who then transforms to impersonate her, seeking to bring Sabrina over to the Dark Lord's side. Sabrina must also deal with three sister witches known as the Weird Sisters, who look down on her for being a "half-breed".
| 2 | 2 | "Chapter Two: The Dark Baptism" | Lee Toland Krieger | Roberto Aguirre-Sacasa | October 26, 2018 |
Sabrina and her family are visited by Father Blackwood, the High Priest of the Church of Night. Blackwood seeks to reassure Sabrina and answer her questions about her baptism to sway her. Meanwhile, Ambrose deals with a corpse for the Spellman funeral home, whom he believes was a warlock, and possibly killed by a witch hunter. Sabrina's friend, Susie, is being bullied by four football players, causing Sabrina to take matters into her own hands. She teams up with the Weird Sisters to teach the boys a lesson by scaring them. However, she is still racked with the choice. Sabrina's birthday arrives, and she decides to spend her last night with her friends at a Halloween party. As midnight approaches, Sabrina heads toward her dark baptism with unease. The ritual is completely different from what Blackwood described, and at the last minute, Sabrina denies the Dark Lord and flees. She is attacked in the woods but arrives at her house. There, she proclaims her refusal to sign the Book of the Beast, ending the baptism.
| 3 | 3 | "Chapter Three: The Trial of Sabrina Spellman" | Rob Seidenglanz | Ross Maxwell | October 26, 2018 |
Sabrina must deal with the aftermath of her decision to leave her dark baptism. She is summoned by the coven and Blackwood, who are suing her for breaking her promise. Zelda and Hilda are also affected and lose their powers during the trial. Sabrina hires a mortal lawyer who specializes in witch law to help her win the trial. Madam Satan does everything in her power to manipulate Sabrina. As the trial continues, Blackwood is adamant that Sabrina must sign her name in the Book of the Beast as her father promised she would days after she was born. However, Hilda provides evidence that Sabrina had received a Catholic baptism before her father's agreement, which shocks Blackwood and the council. In the end, they offer Sabrina a deal: to remain in the mortal world while also attending the Academy of the Unseen Arts. Hilda is excommunicated for her role as a witness in Sabrina's Christian baptism. Meanwhile, Ambrose seeks to learn more about the warlock he thinks was killed by witch hunters.
| 4 | 4 | "Chapter Four: Witch Academy" | Rob Seidenglanz | Donna Thorland | October 26, 2018 |
Sabrina prepares to attend the Academy of Unseen Arts and plans to find a way to stop Satan. Sabrina is met with contempt by some students and staff, but makes a friend in Nick Scratch. Blackwood tasks Sabrina with solving an arcane puzzle known as the Acheron Configuration, and he agrees she may join conjuring class upon solving the puzzle. The Weird Sisters haze Sabrina with a ritual known as harrowing. Sabrina discovers the history of student deaths due to harrowing, and enlists ghosts to help her against the Weird Sisters. It is revealed that Blackwood is behind their attack. Hilda aids Ambrose in astral projection so he may go on a date with Luke, which almost goes wrong. During this time, Madam Satan arrives and searches the Spellman house for items to aid her in her quest and spy on Sabrina. Meanwhile, Sabrina's friends deal with visions of a monster in the mines. Later, Sabrina discovers her father created the Acheron Configuration. With help from one of his journals given to her by Nick, Sabrina solves the arcane puzzle and unknowingly unleashes a demon.
| 5 | 5 | "Chapter Five: Dreams in a Witch House" | Maggie Kiley | Matthew Barry | October 26, 2018 |
The sleep demon, known as Batibat, places Sabrina, Ambrose, Zelda, and Hilda into a deep sleep where they are tortured in their dream-turned-nightmares for one of them to release Batibat from the house. Madam Satan roams their dreams in search of Sabrina to wake her. When she awakens, she attempts to banish Batibat but fails. Sabrina enlists Salem's help to distract Batibat while she lucid dreams to get help from Hilda and Ambrose. Hilda informs Sabrina that Batibat must be lured into a trap. With the help of Hilda's familiars, the spiders, Sabrina successfully traps Batibat, waking Hilda, Zelda, and Ambrose. After Batibat is placed back into containment, Sabrina visits Madam Satan after realizing she is not mortal.
| 6 | 6 | "Chapter Six: An Exorcism in Greendale" | Rachel Talalay | Joshua Conkel & MJ Kaufman | October 26, 2018 |
Madam Satan lies to Sabrina and claims she was her father's secretary when he was a High Priest of the Church of Night, and that he asked her to watch over Sabrina. Susie, Roz, and Harvey all experience frightening apparitions of Susie's Uncle Jesse, and they confide in Sabrina. Sabrina astral projects to Uncle Jesse's room and discovers he is possessed by a parasitic demon, which she later identifies as Apophis. Sabrina, with the help of Madam Satan and her aunts, successfully performs an exorcism that expels Apophis from Uncle Jesse. The next day, Uncle Jesse dies after suffering a heart attack. However, it is later shown that Madam Satan was responsible, and she thanks Jesse for playing his part in the Dark Lord's plan.
| 7 | 7 | "Chapter Seven: Feast of Feasts" | Viet Nguyen | Oanh Ly | October 26, 2018 |
The Spellmans are selected to host the annual Feast of Feasts, and Zelda volunteers to represent their family in the lottery for Queen of the Feast, who is sacrificed and eaten at the feast. During the selection, Sabrina replaces Zelda and becomes handmaiden to Prudence, who is selected as Queen. Sabrina spends the week trying to convince Prudence to reject her selection, and brings her to Baxter High, where she claims Harvey's family are witch hunters. As a precaution, Sabrina casts a protection spell on Harvey. Later, Sabrina discovers that Lady Blackwood was responsible for selecting Prudence as Queen, as Father Blackwood is her biological father. At the feast, Father Blackwood announces that Prudence cannot fulfill her duties as Queen, but before he can cancel the feast, Mildred sacrifices herself and is declared Queen of Feasts. The next day, Agatha and Dorcas perform a ritual to kill Harvey and his brother in the mines.
| 8 | 8 | "Chapter Eight: The Burial" | Maggie Kiley | Lindsay Calhoon & Christianne Hedtke | October 26, 2018 |
Harvey survives the mine collapse thanks to Sabrina's protection spell; however, his brother is killed along with four other humans. During Tommy's funeral, Harvey and his father have an argument, which gets physical, and Tommy's casket falls over. Roz picks up Tommy's helmet and has a vision of Dorcas and Agatha in the mines crushing puppets of Harvey and Tommy with rocks. Roz confides in Sabrina about the vision, called the cunning by her Nana Ruth, after her family was cursed for crossing a witch generations ago. Sabrina tells Prudence, and they, along with Nick and Dorcas, assist in resurrecting Tommy and replacing his soul with Agatha's. However, they use the Cain Pit in the cemetery at the Spellman Sisters' Mortuary to bring her back to life. Meanwhile, Father Blackwood consults with Ambrose about his house arrest and informs him that the deal of immunity still stands if he names his co-conspirators in the plot to blow up the Vatican, but Ambrose refuses. Zelda sleeps with Father Blackwood. While Harvey and his father are having dinner, Tommy returns home.
| 9 | 9 | "Chapter Nine: The Returned Man" | Craig William Macneill | Axelle Carolyn & Christina Ham | October 26, 2018 |
Father Blackwood allows Ambrose to attend the academy despite his sentence, and he obtains his own familiar, a mouse called Leviathan. Agatha becomes sick and begins coughing up dirt. Hilda advises Ambrose that Agatha was never meant to be brought back to life. Roz has another vision of dogs tearing Tommy apart. Sabrina discovers that Tommy's soul is in limbo. Harvey worries for his brother as he is not what he was before the mine collapse. Sabrina travels to mortal limbo with the help of Madam Satan, where she briefly encounters her mother's soul before finding Tommy. However, she is unsuccessful at bringing him back as he is eaten by the Soul-eater. Meanwhile, Susie has been communicating in secret with their ancestor, Dorothea, who asks if the Spellmans are still witches. Later, Sabrina finally tells Harvey that she is a witch and that she needs to kill Tommy, but Harvey chooses to do it and ends his relationship with Sabrina.
| 10 | 10 | "Chapter Ten: The Witching Hour" | Rob Seidenglanz | Roberto Aguirre-Sacasa & Ross Maxwell | October 26, 2018 |
Roz and Susie confront Sabrina about being a witch, and she tells them everything. Madam Satan sacrifices a student at the Hanging Tree to conjure the Greendale Thirteen, witches sacrificed by the coven and hanged by mortals centuries earlier. The Thirteen summon the Red Angel of Death and send Ambrose to warn everyone. Father Blackwood orders all witches to the Academy for their safety. To protect the mortals, the Spellmans conjure a tornado for them to congregate in the storm shelter at Baxter High. The Spellmans cast a protection spell on Baxter High, but Ambrose and Zelda are summoned to the Academy. Madam Satan takes Sabrina to the woods and convinces her to sign the Book of the Beast to gain the power to defeat them. Sabrina unleashes Hellfire on the Hanging Tree and the Thirteen, burning their souls and banishing the Red Angel of Death. During the events, Lady Blackwood dies while giving birth. Zelda lies to Father Blackwood, claiming the larger twin consumed the other when in reality the firstborn twin was a girl, which Zelda keeps for herself. Later, Madam Satan reveals her plan of becoming the Dark Lord's Queen to Hawthorne, before killing him and her familiar.
| 11 | 11 | "Chapter Eleven: A Midwinter's Tale" | Jeff Woolnough | Roberto Aguirre-Sacasa & Donna Thorland | December 14, 2018 |
Leading up to Christmas, the Spellman family prepares to celebrate the Winter Solstice, lighting a Yule log to prevent spirits from entering their home. Zelda is taking care of Lady Blackwood's daughter, Leticia. Sabrina has distanced herself from Harvey and her friends, planning a séance to contact her mother. She asks Madam Satan to lend her the Book of the Dead, but she plots to sabotage the ritual. Susie, working as an elf, is kidnapped after learning that the mall Santa, Bartel, has been trapping the souls of children in wax sculptures. The Spellmans discover a group of ghosts, the Yule Lads, are haunting their household, and must call the children's mother, Gryla, to rid them. Gryla hears Leticia in the basement and demands that the Spellmans hand her over. Sabrina and her mother's spirit tricked Gryla into taking Ambrose's teddy bear instead. Roz tells everyone about Susie's kidnapping, and the Spellmans call Gryla back to fight Bartel, who is a demon, and rescue Susie. Zelda decides to let Leticia live with another outcast witch from the woods, believing the Spellman house was no longer safe for her. The Spellmans, along with Luke, spend Christmas Eve at home while Ambrose reads A Christmas Carol.

=== Part 2 (2019) ===
| No. overall | No. in part | Title | Directed by | Written by | Original release date |
|---|---|---|---|---|---|
| 12 | 1 | "Chapter Twelve: The Epiphany" | Kevin Sullivan | Roberto Aguirre-Sacasa | April 5, 2019 |
Deciding to commit herself fully to the Academy of Unseen Arts, Sabrina takes leave from Baxter High. Despite Father Blackwood's misogynistic opposition, Sabrina and Nick compete for the title of Top Boy, undergoing three arduous challenges. Sabrina is attacked by the three Plague Kings Asmodeus, Purson, and Beelzebub. Meanwhile, Ms. Wardwell becomes the Principal of Baxter High. Susie tries out for the all-male Baxter basketball team, facing fierce opposition due to the team's transphobia. At the urging of Hilda, Sabrina visits her mortal friends and uses magic to help Susie win the try-out match. Susie reveals to Harvey and Roz that he would like to go by the name Theo instead of his birth name. During the conjuring challenge, Sabrina and Nick use the competition to reveal the demons attacking Sabrina. Taking offense, Father Blackwood appoints Ambrose Top Boy. Zelda asks Father Blackwood if he will make their relationship official, and when he says no, she says that she will discontinue their affair until he does. Roz develops feelings for Harvey. Lilith summons the Dark Lord, demanding to know Sabrina's role in his plans.
| 13 | 2 | "Chapter Thirteen: The Passion of Sabrina Spellman" | Michael Goi | MJ Kaufman & Christina Ham | April 5, 2019 |
After learning that the Dark Lord intends to make Sabrina his herald, Lilith strikes a wager with him to determine the true nature of Sabrina's soul. The Dark Lord commands a reluctant Sabrina to steal a pack of chewing gum. Sabrina tries to resist the Dark Lord's command while preparing for her role in the Academy's upcoming play, The Passion of Lucifer Morningstar, and attending classes at Baxter High. Father Blackwood appoints Aunt Zelda as the director and elocution coach for the play, angering Sister Shirley. Back at Baxter High, Theo is bullied by the jocks particularly Billy Marlin due to his gender dysphoria. Sabrina gives Theo a rope charm, which causes Billy to break his leg during an accident. The Dark Lord punishes Sabrina's defiance by marking her with a witches' mark and making her friend Roz and familiar Salem ill. Unwilling to see any harm come to Harvey, Sabrina follows the Dark Lord's orders to burn Baxter High. Before she can carry it out, the Dark Lord stops her, praising her devotion. After Dorcas succumbs to chicken pox, Sabrina gains the starring role as Lilith in the Academy's passion play. Later, the Dark Lord reminds Lilith that he always wins and resurrects her familiar, Stolas, as a consolation prize.
| 14 | 3 | "Chapter Fourteen: Lupercalia" | Salli Richardson-Whitfield | Oanh Ly | April 5, 2019 |
Sabrina and Nick Scratch take part in the annual Lupercalia holiday, the witches' version of Valentine's Day. Meanwhile, Harvey invites Roz for a date at Baxter High's annual Sweetheart Dance. Theo's father reluctantly accepts his child's new transgender male identity. Lilith's plans to harm Sabrina's friends are derailed when Mary Wardwell's fiancé, Adam Masters, returns home. Father Blackwood makes a marriage proposal to Aunt Zelda. Hilda learns that her employer, Dr. Cerberus, and lover suffer from an incubus. At the Sweetheart Dance, Billy, who has suffered a broken leg, apologizes to Theo, who accepts his apology. Sabrina and Nick's budding relationship is complicated by the presence of Nick's werewolf familiar Amalia, who is jealous of Sabrina. Sabrina tries to reassure Amalia that she is no threat, but is forced to kill the werewolf when it attacks Nick. Roz becomes blind as a result of her high myopia.
| 15 | 4 | "Chapter Fifteen: Doctor Cerberus's House of Horror" | Alex García López | Ross Maxwell | April 5, 2019 |
Posing as the fortune teller Mrs McGarvey, Lilith visits Dr. Cerberus's bookstore where Aunt Hilda is working. She uses tarot cards to read the future for several characters, including Sabrina, Theo Putnam, Roz Walker, Zelda, Harvey Kinkle, and Ambrose Spellman, seeking to manipulate them. Sabrina experiences a vision telling her to trust Nick Scratch but to keep him away from the Weird Sisters. Theo undergoes a vision where a botched spell turns his flesh into wood. Roz experiences a vision where she receives her sight back at the expense of another girl, leading her to decline her Reverend father's offer to get his congregation to fund her treatment. Zelda is warned to keep Leticia's whereabouts a secret from Father Blackwood. Harvey decides to pursue his artistic career in Greendale. Ambrose learns that Father Blackwood has malicious intentions towards his female relatives. Following the visions, Sabrina and Nick reaffirm their relationship while Ambrose learns that his lover Luke has perished. Father Blackwood invites him to take Luke's place in the Judas Society.
| 16 | 5 | "Chapter Sixteen: Blackwood" | Alex Pillai | Matthew Barry | April 5, 2019 |
Zelda and Father Blackwood prepare for their wedding despite opposition from Sabrina and Prudence. Zelda convinces Blackwood to lift the excommunication on Hilda. Exploiting Sabrina's animosity towards Blackwood, Lilith impersonates her father Edward's ghost and claims that Blackwood murdered her parents to prevent Edward from promoting his reformist manifesto. Meanwhile, Father Blackwood plans to present his misogynistic manifesto to the visiting Anti-Pope, confirming Ambrose's suspicions about him. After brokering peace between Lady Blackwood and Zelda, Hilda eliminates the jealous Sister Jackson. With Nick's help, Sabrina presents her father's manifesto to the Anti-Pope. However, Father Blackwood frames Ambrose for murdering the Anti-Pope, forcing him into hiding. Needing his family's support, Father Blackwood legitimizes his daughter Prudence. Sabrina and Nick disrupt the wedding by posing as the ghosts of Diana and Edward. However, Blackwood sees through their tricks and expels them from the Academy. Ambrose attempts to assassinate Blackwood but is imprisoned by the coven. Blackwood and Zelda depart with the Anti-Pope's remains to the Vatican Necropolis and a honeymoon.
| 17 | 6 | "Chapter Seventeen: The Missionaries" | Rob Seidenglanz | Donna Thorland | April 5, 2019 |
In a flashback scene, the angelic witch-hunter Jerathmiel of the Order of the Innocents tortures Luke Chalfrant into revealing the location of the Greendale witch community. In the present, Hilda tries to visit her nephew Ambrose, who is imprisoned at the Academy. The Weird Sisters attempt to use magic to force Ambrose to confess to his alleged crimes, but he maintains his innocence. Sabrina returns to Baxter High, but is met by hostility from the blind Roz and a bitter Harvey. Theo, however, speaks up for Sabrina. Jerathmiel and two other witch-hunters attack Sabrina, Hilda, Nick Scratch, and Dorian Gray, but the witches and warlocks survive the attacks. Jerathmiel and the surviving witch-hunter Mehitable invade the Academy of Unseen Arts, capturing the Weird Sisters and the students and gravely wounding Ambrose. While Hilda, Nick, and Harvey tend to Ambrose, Sabrina confronts the angels. Despite being killed, Sabrina is resurrected by the Dark Lord, burns the angels to death, and resurrects two of their victims, while Harvey looks at her in fear. Meanwhile, the Dark Lord reasserts his authority over Lilith by killing her fiancé, Adam, and forcing her to eat his head for dessert. Lilith vows revenge against Satan.
| 18 | 7 | "Chapter Eighteen: The Miracles of Sabrina Spellman" | Antonio Negret | Christianne Hedtke & Lindsay Calhoon Bring | April 5, 2019 |
Following her resurrection and defeat of the angels, Sabrina heals the dying Ambrose. Her newfound powers attract both awe and fear within the witch community in Greendale. Father Blackwood, who has been made Interim Anti-Pope, returns with his wife Zelda, who has been enchanted into submission. Sabrina manages to convince the warlocks of the Witch Council to delay Ambrose's execution until she can present evidence of his mouse familiar, Leviathan, proving that Blackwood orchestrated the murder of the Anti-Pope. Despite finding and resurrecting Leviathan, Blackwood uses an enchanted Zelda to eviscerate the mouse. Sabrina and Hilda free Zelda from the spell. The Dark Lord pardons Ambrose and chastises Father Blackwood, who is stripped of his interim position by the Council. Sabrina wants to use her newfound powers to fulfill her late father's vision of uniting witchkind and mortals. However, Sabrina's plans are derailed when Harvey and Theo discover a mural inside the mines depicting Sabrina as Satan's Herald. Meanwhile, Lilith creates a strawman poppet using her rib.
| 19 | 8 | "Chapter Nineteen: The Mandrake" | Kevin Sullivan | Joshua Conkel | April 5, 2019 |
Sabrina and her witch and mortal friends grapple with the prophecy of her ushering in the End Times as Satan's half-witch, half-mortal Queen. Under the pretext of preventing the prophecy, "Ms. Wardwell" convinces Sabrina to create a mandrake doppelgänger that will serve as a vessel for her mortal powers. Sabrina and Ambrose perform the mandrake spell, but the doppelgänger escapes and kidnaps Sabrina's mortal friends Harvey, Roz, and Theo, intending to create more doppelgängers. However, Theo manages to kill the other doppelgängers. Meanwhile, Father Blackwood secedes from the Churches of Night, creating his own misogynistic Church of Judas. Blackwood discovers that Zelda hid his infant twin daughter Leticia and renames the child Judith Blackwood. Zelda escapes imprisonment with the help of a disillusioned Prudence. After Lilith's strawman poppet tries to kill Sabrina, Sabrina and Nick confront "Ms. Wardwell" for manipulating her. Sabrina kills her doppelgänger in a pistol duel. However, this ends up fulfilling the Satanic herald prophecy, allowing Satan to return in his angelic form to Earth.
| 20 | 9 | "Chapter Twenty: The Mephisto Waltz" | Rob Seidenglanz | Roberto Aguirre-Sacasa | April 5, 2019 |
The Dark Lord visits Greendale in his angelic form and designates Sabrina as the Queen of Hell, intending to usher in the End Times following Sabrina's coronation. He also reveals that he is Sabrina's real father. Angry at Lucifer, Lilith conspires with the Spellmans and Sabrina's mortal friends to defeat his plans. Meanwhile, a jaded Father Blackwood poisons most of the coven and flees with his twin infants. Prudence and the Spellmans save several witches and warlocks. Nick comes up with a plan to trap the Dark Lord in an Acheron Configuration. Harvey, Roz, and Theo use magical sigils to prevent the Dark Lord's demonic hordes from entering Greendale through the Gates of Hell. At the coronation, Sabrina and her friends, and Lilith carry out their plot. However, the Dark Lord destroys the Acheron Configuration, compelling Nick to sacrifice his body as a vessel to imprison the Dark Lord. Before returning with the Dark Lord to Hell, Lilith crowns herself Queen of Hell, restores Sabrina's powers, and resurrects the real Ms. Wardwell. While Zelda reforms the Coven, Prudence and Ambrose embark on a hunt for Blackwood. Meanwhile, Sabrina and her mortal friends vow to bring back Nick from Hell.

=== Part 3 (2020) ===
| No. overall | No. in part | Title | Directed by | Written by | Original release date |
|---|---|---|---|---|---|
| 21 | 1 | "Chapter Twenty-One: The Hellbound Heart" | Rob Seidenglanz | Roberto Aguirre-Sacasa | January 24, 2020 |
A month has passed since Nicholas sacrificed himself to be Lucifer's prison. Sabrina and her friends Harvey, Rosalind, and Theo find a way to Hell, where they meet Caliban, the Prince of Hell, and encounter obstacles set up by Lilith to prevent them from reaching Pandemonium, the capital. Meanwhile, in New Orleans, Prudence and Ambrose make the acquaintance of Marie LaFleur, a voodoo priestess who helps them track down Father Blackwood. In Hell, Sabrina decides to take on her responsibility as Queen to prevent Caliban from taking over, but before leaving, she frees Nick and chains him in the dungeons of the Academy. Meanwhile, Hilda and Zelda reopen the Academy of Unseen Arts and decide that the coven will now worship Lilith instead of Lucifer. Sabrina and her friends celebrate the success of their mission, while unbeknownst to them, the Old Ones, whose arrival was predicted by Lucifer, have arrived in Greendale.
| 22 | 2 | "Chapter Twenty-Two: Drag Me to Hell" | Alex Pillai | Ross Maxwell | January 24, 2020 |
Sabrina and Rosalind join the cheerleading team while Sabrina wrestles with sending souls to Hell. Defying expectations, she sends a soul to Heaven, angering the royal courtiers. Lilith advises Sabrina to imprison the next soul, Jimmy Platt, an ice cream vendor. In Scotland, Prudence and Ambrose track down Father Blackwood, living outside of time with his children. Lucifer sends beetles to torment the coven upon learning they pray to Lilith. Sabrina uncovers Jimmy's dark deeds, rescues a kidnapped girl, and condemns Jimmy to eternal torment at a pep rally. Hilda and Zelda discover Sabrina has brought Nick and Lucifer back from Hell. Prudence and Ambrose return with Blackwood as a prisoner. To free Nick, Sabrina and Zelda plan to use Blackwood as a vessel to imprison Lucifer. Theo meets Robin, and a carnival arrives in Greendale.
| 23 | 3 | "Chapter Twenty-Three: Heavy Is the Crown" | Rob Seidenglanz | Oanh Ly | January 24, 2020 |
Nick copes with Hell's trauma at Dorian's, while Sabrina faces Prince Caliban's challenge to find the Unholy Regalia, beginning with King Herod's Crown. The group visits a strange carnival where Rosalind has a vision and Harvey watches a snake dancer, Nagaina. In Greendale, Mary consults fortune teller Circe, while Dr. Cerberus proposes to Hilda. Sabrina locates the crown but is thwarted by Herod, allowing Caliban to steal it. Back in Hell, Sabrina remains determined to win. The carnival's members are revealed as pagans with plans to resurrect the Green Man.
| 24 | 4 | "Chapter Twenty-Four: The Hare Moon" | Viet Nguyen | Donna Thorland | January 24, 2020 |
Sabrina and her aunts learn that Lucifer stripped the coven's powers, prompting Aunt Hilda to use the Hare Moon's light for a ritual. Harvey discovers his father's involvement with carnival Gorgon Nagaina, leading him, Roz, and Theo to investigate. Nagaina attacks, turning Roz to stone. Church of Night invites carnival pagans for a picnic, but tensions escalate. Aunt Hilda is cursed by Circe, and the pagans issue an ultimatum. Desperate, the Spellmans consider freeing Lucifer, but Sabrina finds Nick has already done so.
| 25 | 5 | "Chapter Twenty-Five: The Devil Within" | Roxanne Benjamin | Matthew Barry | January 24, 2020 |
Ambrose puts Nick through drug rehab as Sabrina informs Harvey and Theo about the carnival pagans worshiping the Green Man. Aunt Hilda begins transforming into a spider creature. Hell's three kings demand the Unholy Regalia contest, tasking Sabrina and Caliban with retrieving Pontius Pilate's Bowl. Lucifer undermines the coven, manipulating Harvey into attacking the carnival and turning Baxter High's jocks into pigs. Ambrose and Prudence use a stone circle to summon hedge witches, disrupted when a stone is shattered. Sabrina thwarts Caliban, steals the infernal bowl, and breaks up with Nick. Robin reveals he's a Hobgoblin. The coven faces enraged hedge witches.
| 26 | 6 | "Chapter Twenty-Six: All of Them Witches" | Michael Goi | Joshua Conkel | January 24, 2020 |
The Hedge Witches arrive, threatening the coven, but Aunt Zelda negotiates peace. Sabrina discovers Robin is a pagan. Caliban's attempt to help turns tragic as Nagaina shatters Roz. Lilith hides from Lucifer at Mary's house. Mambo Marie befriends Aunt Zelda. Despite efforts, the spell to restore Roz fails. Sabrina convinces Hedge Witches to lend power to force Circe to free Rosalind. Aunt Hilda, affected by a bloodthirst, seemingly kills Dr. Cerberus. Zelda shoots Hilda, burying her for resurrection. Driven to misguided vengeance by Lucifer in Blackwood's body, Mary shoots Zelda.
| 27 | 7 | "Chapter Twenty-Seven: The Judas Kiss" | Craig William Macneill | Lindsay Calhoon Bring | January 24, 2020 |
While Marie, Prudence, and Ambrose take care of Zelda's body. Sabrina takes part in the final regalia challenge, which is to find Judas's silver coins. Blackwood conspires with the pagans and recruits the insane Agatha, who murdered Dorcas. While in Limbo Zelda and Hilda encounter their brother Edward, who guides them through their past and future. After an encounter with Vlad the Impaler, Sabrina manages to get the silver coins, during her participation in the challenge Blackwood and Agatha arrive at the Spellman house, where Agatha is accidentally killed by Prudence who gets killed by Blackwood, Zelda wakes up from the dead and discovers that Marie is dead and gets stabbed by Blackwood. Meanwhile The Pagans kidnap Harvey, Roz, and Theo and kill Robin and Nicholas, in hell Sabrina gets tricked by Caliban who traps her in stone alongside Lucifer and the pregnant Lilith, while on earth the pagans sacrifice Harvey to their god the Green Man.
| 28 | 8 | "Chapter Twenty-Eight: Sabrina Is Legend" | Rob Seidenglanz | Roberto Aguirre-Sacasa & Daniel King | January 24, 2020 |
Decades later, Sabrina awakens in a time loop and swaps places with her future self. With the Regalia's Guards, she goes to the Mortal Realm and collaborates with Ambrose. Using the Regalia to siphon the Time Egg's magic, she successfully saves her loved ones. The Coven, with the Triple Goddess Hecate's power, restores their abilities and resurrects Hilda. Sabrina tricks the Pagans and defeats them, returning to Hell to complete the time loop. However, she changes her mind, warning her past self about Caliban and creating a paradox. Sabrina Morningstar reigns in Hell, while Sabrina Spellman lives on Earth. Hilda reunites with Dr. Cee, Prudence seeks revenge on Blackwood, and Zelda forms the Order of Hecate with Marie. Blackwood, Agatha, Judas, and Judith release the Eldritch Terrors by breaking the Time Egg.

=== Part 4 (2020) ===
| No. overall | No. in part | Title | Directed by | Written by | Original release date |
|---|---|---|---|---|---|
| 29 | 1 | "Chapter Twenty-Nine: The Eldritch Dark" | Jeff Woolnough | Roberto Aguirre-Sacasa & Gigi Swift | December 31, 2020 |
The First of the Eldritch Terrors, the Darkness, arrives in Greendale. Sabrina starts to feel lonely as all her friends are in romantic relationships. At the suggestion of Hilda, Sabrina makes up a false threat to get the gang back together. Roz discovers through her cunning that it was just a ruse. The Witches encounter the Darkness and Sabrina Spellman and Sabrina Morningstar work together to defeat it with the help of the Coven. Meanwhile, Ms. Wardwell gets recruited by Agatha to be a member of Faustus Blackwood's new church.
| 30 | 2 | "Chapter Thirty: The Uninvited" | Alex Pillai | Katie Avery | December 31, 2020 |
The second and next Eldritch Terror, the Uninvited, knocks on the doors of Greendale residents and kills those who turn him away. He arrives at Harvey's house but Roz's cunning helps them survive. In his sleep, Harvey draws the Terrors. The Uninvited goes to Blackwood's new church. Blackwood cleans him up and directs him to Aunt Hilda and Dr. Cee's wedding. Sabrina and Lilith try to break up Sabrina Morningstar and Caliban before their wedding. Nick and Sabrina turn away the Uninvited, who kills Dorian Gray. Sabrina takes the Uninvited to Hell to attend the royal wedding. The two Sabrinas trap him in their childhood dollhouse.
| 31 | 3 | "Chapter Thirty-One: The Weird" | Lisa Soper | Jenina Kibuka | December 31, 2020 |
The third Eldritch Terror, the Weird, comes to Blackwood's church looking to possess Sabrina's body. He possesses a corpse that is sent to the Spellman Mortuary. The Weird leaves the body and enters Sabrina, causing her to experience painful symptoms. Prudence, Mambo Marie and Roz form the Sentinels, a trio of seers who keep an eye out for Eldritch Terrors. A new student named Lucas joins Baxter High. The Weird begins to gain control of Sabrina. Pesta rots Sabrina's brain so the terror finds her mind uninhabitable. Ambrose traps it in a frozen tank of water. Meanwhile in Hell, Caliban plots to kill Lilith's baby. He casts a spell causing Lilith to give birth immediately. The coven helps during the delivery and shelters Lilith and her newborn son Adam afterward.
| 32 | 4 | "Chapter Thirty-Two: The Imp of the Perverse" | Antonio Negret | Christianne Hedtke | December 31, 2020 |
Roz reveals her Sentinel identity to Harvey, who struggles with the news. The Eldritch Terror is handed to Blackwood. Prudence tries to kill him, but he alters reality, becoming Emperor Blackwood. Sabrina and Roz remain unaffected, seeking help from Ambrose, who is influenced by the changes. Zelda guides them to a resistance group, and with the Stone of Omphalos, memories are restored. Sabrina uses the Imp to revert reality, and they resume their campaign. Prudence beheads Blackwood, taking him and Agatha, who regains insanity, to the Academy.
| 33 | 5 | "Chapter Thirty-Three: Deus Ex Machina" | Amanda Tapping | Eleanor Jean | December 31, 2020 |
In the face of celestial consequences, Roz and Sabrina lead at Baxter High, and Nick enrolls to mend ties. An earthquake sends mortals to Hell, Theo urges Robin to the Fae Realm, and Prudence tortures Blackwood for terror details. Mambo Marie uncovers a merging Infernal and Mortal Realm at the Academy. Nick and Sabrina reconcile, but Metatron's angelic intervention is halted by Ambrose. As three realms converge, Sabrina Morningstar opts for the parallel universe. In that realm, she encounters Aunts Hilda and Zelda from the 1996 "Sabrina the Teenage Witch" show. Lilith loses her powers, turning mortal, after Adam's demise due to Lucifer's threat.
| 34 | 6 | "Chapter Thirty-Four: The Returned" | Catriona McKenzie | Oanh Ly & Ross Maxwell | December 31, 2020 |
Concerned about Sabrina Morningstar, Sabrina Spellman receives comfort from Nick. Lilith disguises a doll as Adam to maintain coven support. Hilda denies her resurrected dog, Vinegar Tom, but Mambo Marie identifies it as the Eldritch Terror, the Returned. Marie introduces a game to defeat the terrors. Satanic Panic, an 80s band, reappears at Baxter High, involving Harvey in a dark secret. Edward Spellman's return brings tension. Dorcas targets Agatha, and Dr. Cee's mother attacks Hilda. Lilith seeks the Spear of Longinus to end her life. The Dark Mothers win a battle of the bands to free Mr. Kinkle. Lazarus wins Marie's game, but Lilith stabs him. Marie departs, revealing her true identity to Zelda. The Returned return to their graves, and Greendale is saved from another terror.
| 35 | 7 | "Chapter Thirty-Five: The Endless" | Kevin Sullivan | Donna Thorland & Matthew Barry | December 31, 2020 |
Sabrina Morningstar ventures into a parallel universe, encountering Aunts Hilda and Zelda from the 1996 "Sabrina the Teenage Witch" show. They're actors on a sitcom directed by Blackwood, with Salem as the main star. Mistakes lead to the Green Room. Sabrina loses her powers and realizes her real-life moments are scripted scenes. Harvey kisses her on set, revealing Roz isn't his girlfriend. Salem is an Eldritch Terror. Sabrina discovers scenes affect the actors' reality. Caliban is creating a Void for the next scene. Speaking to head writer Salem, she warns of The Void. They escape crew attacks, secretly servants of The Void, and crash through the bedroom mirror into the Living Realm.
| 36 | 8 | "Chapter Thirty-Six: At the Mountains of Madness" | Rob Seidenglanz | Roberto Aguirre-Sacasa | December 31, 2020 |
In the aftermath, Ms. Wardwell recounts the Eldritch Gospels at the church. Nick gives Sabrina a matching locket, but their tender moment is interrupted when Sabrina Morningstar warns of The Void. Sabrina Spellman opens Pandora's box to trap the Eldritch Terror. Witches resurrect Sabrina's mind in Morningstar's body, angering Lucifer. As Sabrina discovers a piece of The Void within her, she isolates herself in the Mountains of Madness. In Hell, Lilith regains power by stabbing Lucifer. Blackwood allies with Sabrina to control the Void. Nick uses the locket to locate Sabrina's body, while others trick Blackwood and open a portal. Ambrose, Harvey, and Nick enter, with Nick barely making it back before Sabrina dies. A funeral is held, and in the Sweet Hereafter, Sabrina reunites with Nick, who drowned in the Sea of Sorrows unable to live without her. They tearfully kiss.
