= List of Boston Public episodes =

Boston Public, an American drama television series created by David E. Kelley debuted on Fox on October 23, 2000. The series was canceled during its fourth season, and Fox aired its final episode on January 30, 2004, although two episodes were left unaired by the network. The final two episodes were subsequently aired on March 1 and 2, 2005 on TV One. The series centers on the teachers and students of Winslow High School, a fictional public high school located in Boston, Massachusetts.

== Series overview ==
Season	Episodes	Originally released	
Season	Episodes	First released	Last released
1	22	October 23, 2000	May 21, 2001
2	22	October 29, 2001	May 20, 2002
3	22	October 21, 2002	May 12, 2003
4	15	September 19, 2003	January 30, 2004

== Episodes ==
=== Season 1 (2000–01) ===
No. overall	No. in season	Title	Directed by	Written by	Original release date	Prod. code
1	1	"Chapter One"	Thomas Schlamme	David E. Kelley	October 23, 2000	1B01
Another school year is off to a booming start at Winslow High School – an urban high school outside of Boston. Principal Steven Harper spends his days resolving problems, defending his faculty and just trying to keep it together. Lauren Davis, the idealistic head of the social studies department, and Harry Senate, a geology teacher with buried secrets, are embroiled in controversy for failing the star running back before a huge game with the cross-town rivals. But they both have bigger personal problems. Lauren has been asked out on a date by icy Vice Principal Scott Guber, and Harry has been put on probation for wielding a gun in one of his classes. When he is not dodging the star running back's lawyer or pulling a bully off the class geek, Principal Harper is trying to calm Ms. Hendricks. She left her class after scrawling "Gone to kill myself, hope you're happy" on the chalkboard. Meanwhile, English teacher Milton Buttle has become the star attraction on student Sheryl Holt's website. His unflattering, animated portrayal has made Buttle the butt of everyone's jokes. Also, Harvey Lipschultz, the 80-year-old American history teacher, kicked popular student Dana Poole out of class for not wearing a bra.
2	2	"Chapter Two"	Jack Bender	David E. Kelley	October 30, 2000	1B02
Last week's bra protest has resulted in school unity. All the girls have decided to go bra-less in a show of solidarity with Dana Poole. The superintendent is pressing Harper because Lauren has rallied a few of the other teachers, and they all refuse to get fingerprinted. Also, Marla, who is supposed to be on medical leave, has arrived at work. Lipschultz, the man behind the bra debacle, has shown up on Sheryl Holt's infamous website in a bra and panties. Meanwhile, Vice Principal Guber tries to regain control by meeting with Dana Poole. He suspects that she is high, so he demands a urine sample. She protests and bolts to Harry.
3	3	"Chapter Three"	Mel Damski	David E. Kelley	November 6, 2000	1B03
Principal Harper's job is in jeopardy and an impending school board meeting has him on edge. Still, he can't help but get involved when Anthony Ward is found hanging upside down from the roof. It turns out the entire soccer team has ganged up on little Anthony since he thwarted their attempts to download answers for a test. Harper's decision to suspend the entire team, and thereby forfeit the soccer season, only adds fuel to Superintendent Marla Shinn's fire. Meanwhile, Harry Senate confesses to kissing Dana Poole and explains her blackmail scheme. Guber sends a shocked Dana to Bob "Big Boy" Lick for counseling but Harper does not suspend Senate. Coach Riley, on the other hand, is dealing with a football team who has marked one of their teammates as gay and will not shower with him. Plus, Lauren is left to defend herself when Superintendent Shinn questions the topic of cannibalism being taught in Lauren's classroom. At the school board meeting, things come to a head when all of the faculty's – and Principal Harper's – indiscretions are exposed. Surprisingly, an impassioned speech by Marla Hendricks puts everything into perspective, and even manages to silence Superintendent Shinn whom she calls for only showing up when it’s convenient. At least, temporarily.
4	4	"Chapter Four"	Bryan Gordon	David E. Kelley	November 13, 2000	1B04
Rehearsals are in full swing for the annual charity show. Marilyn is dismayed to learn that the main skit the students have prepared is a spoof of the Winslow High faculty – complete with a gun-toting Senate and Buttle stuck inside a donkey! Elsewhere on campus, Lauren enters a stairwell and catches two student body presidential candidates engaged in a sex act. Lauren confronts the students – Peter and Susan – who deny any wrongdoing. However, when Peter later drops out of the election, it becomes clear that Susan's sexual favor was a motivating factor. On top of all this, Lauren must also deal with John LeBlond, who is an excellent student but part of the recently suspended soccer team, and who needs Harper's approval to apply for a prestigious academic award.
5	5	"Chapter Five"	Rachel Talalay	David E. Kelley	November 20, 2000	1B05
It's Thanksgiving week, but no one seems particularly grateful. Guber, for example, is still upset over his onstage serenade at the charity show. Football player Jason Harrelson broke bully Malcolm White's arm during a fight in the hall. Buttle is starring in yet another Sheryl Holt original online humiliation cartoon. Last, but not least, Lauren discovered a senior sex posse which awards senior guys points for sex. In response to the sex posse scandal, Principal Harper organizes a sophomore assembly to preach the benefits of chastity. The teachers draw straws, and Lipschultz is chosen to head up the event. Later at the assembly, Lipschultz' boring speech turns shocking when he confesses to catching his beloved late wife in bed with another man.
6	6	"Chapter Six"	Jonathan Pontell	David E. Kelley	November 27, 2000	1B06
A popular and beloved teacher, Mr. McMahon, has a heart attack and dies at school. A close friend of the deceased, Principal Harper overcomes his own grief to help his students cope with the loss. To make matters worse, it appears that McMahon had been having an affair with a female senior, Karen Fitzgerald. While Harper struggles to deal with the incident's aftermath and maintain status quo, the students and faculty begin to fall apart. A defiant pupil, Webster, spits on Lauren and she vows to have him expelled. The case becomes more complex, however, when Harper learns that Webster was close to Mr. McMahon and is upset over his death.
7	7	"Chapter Seven"	Michael Schultz	David E. Kelley	December 4, 2000	1B07
Life seems to be one big lawsuit for Principal Harper. First, Mrs. Walsh, who was fired for spanking her students, sues for wrongful termination. Then, after Harper suspends Sheryl Holt for offensive content on her website, she sues to get the suspension overturned. Lauren gets knocked out by a launched breast implant. While Marylin counsels the girl on her self-image, Lauren decides to let the boyfriend off the hook. In court, Lipschultz's testimony – on both the Holt and Walsh cases – is disastrous and results in two losses for the school.
8	8	"Chapter Eight"	David Semel	David E. Kelley	December 11, 2000	1B08
Buttle meets a beautiful girl, Lisa, who shares his love of Shakespeare. Back at Winslow High, Senate learns that Juan Figgis' mother has been convicted on drug charges and is going to prison. Meanwhile, Lipschultz collapses in class and is rushed to the hospital.
9	9	"Chapter Nine"	Arlene Sanford	John J. Sakmar & Kerry Lenhart	January 8, 2001	1B09
The first day back at school has barely begun when the police show up looking for a murder suspect. A botched robbery has gone down a few blocks away and the panicked assailant, wearing a Winslow High letterman's jacket, shot and killed a man before heading towards school grounds.
10	10	"Chapter Ten"	Michael Pressman	David E. Kelley	January 15, 2001	1B10
Sheryl Holt breaks the news about Milton and Lisa's secret affair on her website. Suspicious, Harper confronts Buttle about his sexual involvement, but Milton disavows any wrongdoing, claiming that he and Lisa have started a "Shakespeare Club." However, Riley has his hands full with another explosive situation – an anonymous bully has severely beaten three male students. Meanwhile, Marylin suspects that a girl in her class is a victim of incest when the student writes a "fictional" essay about her father molesting her. In the middle of this crisis, Guber asks Lipschultz to resign after accusing him of being a racist.
11	11	"Chapter Eleven"	Alan Myerson	David E. Kelley	January 22, 2001	1B11
Coach Riley has a serious crush on Marylin Sudor but is nervous about asking her out due to their racial differences. Meanwhile, Harper is concerned about the cheerleading squad. They have been rehearsing for an important competition, but their new routine is very sexual. The choreographer argues that it's impossible to tone down the program, so Harper cancels the meet. Regardless of the consequences, Lisa and Buttle continue to tempt fate and continue their heated affair, and in an effort to help his kids discuss their feelings, Senate forms a "Suicide Club," which outrages parents and faculty alike.
12	12	"Chapter Twelve"	Alex Graves	David E. Kelley, John J. Sakmar & Kerry Lenhart	February 5, 2001	1B12
As Senate approaches the school grounds, he saves a student from being attacked by gang members. After numerous attempts, Harry finally manages to get the boy to reveal that he is a member of the Crips. Meanwhile, Harper grows even more suspicious about Lisa and Buttle's deepening friendship, so Guber takes the reins and alerts Lisa's parents about their daughter's rumored affair. In the midst of these crises, Lauren has her hands full trying to help an overweight female wrestler, Christine, cope with the loss of her boyfriend.
13	13	"Chapter Thirteen"	Jonathan Pontell	David E. Kelley	February 12, 2001	1B13
When Coach Riley is fired for withholding information about Buttle's affair, he hires the best attorneys in Boston – Ellenor Frutt and Jimmy Berluti. Ellenor immediately begins subpoenaing witnesses, sending a message to Winslow High that she means business. Meanwhile, Lauren discovers that Harry had dated another co-worker, Jenna, before her. Disturbed that Harry would have a relationship with a woman Lauren deems unsavory, she becomes concerned about her own relationship with Senate. This episode concludes a crossover with The Practice that begins on "The Day After".
14	14	"Chapter Fourteen"	Joanna Kerns	David E. Kelley, John J. Sakmar & Kerry Lenhart	February 19, 2001	1B14
Lauren finds Harry hasn't told his friend about her. Six teachers resign and Marla must teach a class she doesn't know how to. Scott wins a contest to be a guest conductor and asks Marilyn out when she is too nice to him. Steven and Harry look for a missing teacher.
15	15	"Chapter Fifteen"	Sheldon Larry	Story by : Alicia Martin, Jeremy Miller & Daniel Cohn; Teleplay by : David E. Kelley, John J. Sakmar & Kerry Lenhart	February 26, 2001	1B15
Harry advises Tyronn to leave town when he is shot at. Harvey sends Scott on a two-hour drive for a non-existing conducting opportunity. A student accuses the cheerleading teacher of touching her in inappropriate ways.
16	16	"Chapter Sixteen"	Joe Napolitano	David E. Kelley, John J. Sakmar & Kerry Lenhart	March 26, 2001	1B16
Security tapes of the girls' shower room are missing... with footage of Lauren on them. Marla sends her entire class to the principal's office. Anthony's hit list is found. Lauren and Harry break up.
17	17	"Chapter Seventeen"	Duane Clark	David E. Kelley, John J. Sakmar & Kerry Lenhart	April 16, 2001	1B17
A student's mother complains about bus fumes to Steven. The tape of Lauren showering ends up on Sheryl Holt's website. Harry gets in trouble for knowing Tyronn was a murderer. Scott becomes Lisa Grier's co-teacher for her Shakespeare class.
18	18	"Chapter Eighteen"	Elodie Keene	David E. Kelley	April 23, 2001	1B18
Scott fires an art teacher twice. Christine Banks dies of a heart attack after winning a wrestling match. Harry finds out Dana Poole has become a stripper. Marla insults janitors and she finds one of her student's father is a janitor.
19	19	"Chapter Nineteen"	Sheldon Larry	David E. Kelley, John J. Sakmar & Kerry Lenhart	April 30, 2001	1B19
While heading to work, Lauren's car breaks down. She gets so frustrated with it that she starts jumping up and down on it and smashing the windows with a baseball bat. Suddenly, an old student of hers appears named Daniel Evans who thanks her for changing his life. He shows her a history text book he has written and she is very impressed. He asks her out for a drink, and she immediately says yes. After, they head to her place and have a night of passion. The next day she tells Marilyn, who finds it a little immoral. Lauren cannot get past how great the sex was. Lauren admits she finds it a total turn on when Daniel calls her Ms. Davis.
20	20	"Chapter Twenty"	Mike Listo	Story by : Adam Armus, Nora Kay Foster, David E. Kelley, John J. Sakmar & Kerry Lenhart; Teleplay by : David E. Kelley, John J. Sakmar & Kerry Lenhart	May 7, 2001	1B20
Lauren continues her relationship with Daniel. Marilyn finds out that Jeremy's mother is locking her son in the basement for punishment. Steven can't date a student's mother. Kevin punches an opponent in a debate.
21	21	"Chapter Twenty-One"	Michael Zinberg	David E. Kelley, John J. Sakmar & Kerry Lenhart	May 14, 2001	1B21
Steven's remarks prevent Scott from getting a job as a headmaster. Lauren finds out Daniel is stalking her. Marla worries when a convicted sex offender asks a younger girl to the senior prom. Marilyn suspects Jeremy has done something to his mother.
22	22	"Chapter Twenty-Two"	Jonathan Pontell	David E. Kelley	May 21, 2001	1B22
Lauren gets a gun to protect herself from Daniel. Jeremy won't tell Marilyn what happened to his mother. Marla gives Winslow High's first student to get accepted to Harvard an F.

=== Season 2 (2001–02) ===
No. overall	No. in season	Title	Directed by	Written by	Original release date	Prod. code
23	1	"Chapter Twenty-Three"	Jonathan Pontell	David E. Kelley	October 29, 2001	2B01
Ronnie Cooke, a wealthy attorney, decides to become a teacher at the school, which quickly stirs things up between her fellow teachers and the students. Meanwhile, Harvey gets into trouble after giving a student the wrong name and Marla is enlisted to sponsor a club of female students, which causes her to examine her own insecurity.
24	2	"Chapter Twenty-Four"	Alan Myerson	David E. Kelley	November 5, 2001	2B02
Ronnie's career at Winslow High gets off to a precarious start when Guber sees her in a compromising position. Meanwhile, Lauren tries to help a straight-A student get into Princeton, but Harper wants to transfer the student to a continuation school because she is pregnant. Mrs. Peters, looking very different, volunteers as a teacher's assistant at Winslow.
25	3	"Chapter Twenty-Five"	Sheldon Larry	David E. Kelley	November 12, 2001	2B03
Harry is outraged when he learns that one of his prized students was admitted to Williams College because he bought his college application essay over the Internet. Harvey calls a student a derogatory term and new teacher Danny Hanson wants him held accountable, but Harper refuses. Danny goes to Ronnie for legal help, and his class decides to sue Harvey for defamation of character.
26	4	"Chapter Twenty-Six"	Duane Clark	David E. Kelley, John J. Sakmar & Kerry Lenhart	November 19, 2001	2B04
Harper's headstrong daughter Brooke enrolls at Winslow High after she is kicked out of private school. Meanwhile, when Ronnie is disappointed that her class is not learning Shakespeare, her ex-suitor Matthew Baskin, who continues to pursue her, offers a unique way to reach her and her students.
27	5	"Chapter Twenty-Seven"	Jack Bender	David E. Kelley	November 26, 2001	2B05
Danny is arrested after a domestic dispute, causing Harper to seriously consider firing him. Lauren is skeptical when a student decides to drop out because a record company wants to sign her, and Harper is livid when he discovers that someone close to him has been anonymously dispensing sex advice in the student newspaper.
28	6	"Chapter Twenty-Eight"	David Semel	David E. Kelley, John J. Sakmar & Kerry Lenhart	December 3, 2001	2B06
A statutory rape case entangles Ronnie with the enraged parents of the fifteen-year-old victim. An illicit-drug situation embroils Harper with his unsettled daughter.
29	7	"Chapter Twenty-Nine"	Mike Listo	David E. Kelley, John J. Sakmar & Kerry Lenhart, Daniel Cohn & Jeremy Miller	December 10, 2001	2B07
Brooke is anxious for a reconciliation between her divorced mom and dad. Guber and Mrs. Peters shop together for a special Christmas present. Marilyn, Marla and Louisa form a musical trio at the school pageant. Harry gets caught up in the plight of a sensitive youth who he thinks may be suicidal.
30	8	"Chapter Thirty"	Michael Schultz	John J. Sakmar, Kerry Lenhart & Douglas Steinberg	January 7, 2002	2B08
A revelation concerning Jeremy fractures the relationship between his mother and Guber. A plea from a death-row inmate troubles Harper, and a student's ADD disquiets Ronnie.
31	9	"Chapter Thirty-One"	Mark Harmon	David E. Kelley, John J. Sakmar & Kerry Lenhart	January 14, 2002	2B09
Tensions escalate among Meredith, Jeremy and Guber, who seek family counseling. Controversy swirls around a student's class-project photo and a speech by Harvey.
32	10	"Chapter Thirty-Two"	Joe Napolitano	David E. Kelley, John J. Sakmar & Kerry Lenhart	January 21, 2002	2B10
Lauren asks Guber to go to a concert with her on the night of his three months celebration with Meredith and he accepts. This angers Meredith. Danny is having problems with religion in school. One of Ronnie's students attempts suicide and is pregnant because of a sex crime after she is impregnated for the purpose of having the child for her parents. Harvey moves onto the state finals with his speech and places in the top three.
33	11	"Chapter Thirty-Three"	Jeannot Szwarc	David E. Kelley, John J. Sakmar & Kerry Lenhart	January 28, 2002	2B11
Ronnie and Danny discover that Brooke is dating a 27-year-old man and report it to Steven. Steven is outraged at this discovery and demands Brooke stop seeing him. She disagrees at first but the next morning, her boyfriend Rupert reports to Steven that the two have broken up. Brooke later debates leaving Winslow High but Steven convinces her not to. After Harry getting sick of his students being considered dumb, he challenges Guber to a debate in preparation for a big upcoming debate for Scott's debate team. He accepts and the two teams practice to no end. When it comes debate time, both teams deliver but Scott's team comes out victorious but only by three points.
34	12	"Chapter Thirty-Five"	Jonathan Pontell	David E. Kelley, John J. Sakmar & Kerry Lenhart & Alicia Martin	February 4, 2002	2B13
The faculty decide to have a staff talent show to lighten the mood at Winslow. Lipschultz asks Ronnie to sing a duet with him at the talent show but she convinces him that Marylin is just waiting to be asked. Meanwhile Danny befriends one of his cerebral palsy kids and arranges for him to attend Winslow. The mood is severely challenged when a student finds a notebook with plans for a bombing and shooting spree at Winslow.
35	13	"Chapter Thirty-Six"	Mel Damski	John J. Sakmar, Kerry Lenhart & Douglas Steinberg	February 11, 2002	2B14
A student's illness rattles Senate, who is haunted by feelings of futility; a teen's eating disorder upsets Lauren, who is also unnerved by a website advocating anorexia.
36	14	"Chapter Thirty-Four"	Roy Campanella II	David E. Kelley	February 18, 2002	2B12
Seven teenagers, including Zack, are killed in a drunk driving crash and the students and teachers, both, must face their grief. Ronnie takes it especially hard having been close with Zack. Brooke's best friend was also killed in the crash. Meanwhile, Harvey tries to convince the students that he was George Washington in a previous life.
37	15	"Chapter Thirty-Seven"	Mike Listo	David E. Kelley, John J. Sakmar, Kerry Lenhart & Sean Whitesell	February 25, 2002	2B15
Controversy swirls at Winslow over a reviled racial epithet, which becomes a heated subject of debate in a class taught by the provocative Danny Hanson, who fans the flames by alleging a double standard. "Clearly," he tells his students, "people seem OK with Chris Rock using the word... But if Garry Shandling did... you'd all be sick." Word gets to Harper, who calls upon Hanson to cease the discussion because "the word stirs up too much hate." But when the teacher persists, the principal trumps him. "Do you think you understand nigger, Danny? Do you think you really get it?"
38	16	"Chapter Thirty-Eight"	Bethany Rooney	Story by : Allen Estrin & Joseph Telushki; Teleplay by : David E. Kelley, John J. Sakmar & Kerry Lenhart	March 11, 2002	2B16
Mikki, an 18-year-old Winslow student, tricks Harper and the administration into allowing Just Eighteen, a racy Maxim-like magazine to come to the school to shoot provocative photos of her. Ronnie, who stumbles upon the shoot, pleads with Mikki not to pose for the magazine, saying it is a decision she will regret for the rest of her life. Meanwhile, back at school, a student approaches Guber with information that Meredith hit her with her prosthesis during an argument. Also at the school, one of Lauren's students has an emotional break-down. The breakdown was apparently brought on by stress, caused from Lauren pushing too hard.
39	17	"Chapter Thirty-Nine"	Mark Harmon	John J. Sakmar, Kerry Lenhart & Douglas Steinberg	March 18, 2002	2B17
Ronnie catches a student performing a crime; two female students tell Marylin about their sexual conversations online with an older man.
40	18	"Chapter Forty"	Elodie Keene	John J. Sakmar, Kerry Lenhart, Daniel Cohn & Jeremy Miller	April 22, 2002	2B18
Dana Poole returns to Winslow High as a mature, sexy, college freshman looking to spend time with Senate for a class project. Meanwhile, Lipschultz gets a visit from a 58-year-old man who says he's his son, and Hanson is accused of giving special treatment to Debbie.
41	19	"Chapter Forty-One"	Michael Zinberg	David E. Kelley	April 29, 2002	2B19
Ronnie puts together a surprise birthday party for Senate but her good intentions quickly turns into chaos when all the guests resort to bickering and nitpicking at each other. Among the sparks at the party, Lipschultz snoops into Harper's briefcase and reveals his application for headmaster at an opposing school, while Lauren and Scott grow closer together as she has her own issues after being called a perfectionist.
42	20	"Chapter Forty-Two"	Arlene Sanford	John J. Sakmar, Kerry Lenhart & Alicia Martin	May 6, 2002	2B20
As the prom approaches, female students outrage the faculty when they auction themselves as dates, while Harper deals with angry students who oppose his allowing a transgender student to compete for the queen's crown.
43	21	"Chapter Forty-Three"	Mike Listo	David E. Kelley	May 13, 2002	2B21
Lauren and Marilyn investigate a student who seems to be eating her own hair. Danny is discovered having sent letters home to the "over-weight" girls in his class after he is punched by a girl who received one of these letters. Marla goes to Steven and Scott about this issue, asking that he be fired. Meanwhile, Scott and Steven are continuing to have personality conflicts regarding leadership. Jamal Crenshaw's brother, Amaad, murders a store clerk and soon after, Jamal confides in Harry. Harry takes it to Ronnie, a past lawyer, who believes that Jamal's best bet is to turn himself in. However, when he doesn't; Harry and Ronnie do. Later on, Amaad comes to visit Harry at Winslow High and when things get out of hand, Harry calls the police. But before he can give them any details, he is stabbed by Amaad three times.
44	22	"Chapter Forty-Four"	Jonathan Pontell	David E. Kelley	May 20, 2002	2B22
Staff and students at Winslow High struggle to get on with their lives after a number of tragic events.

=== Season 3 (2002–03) ===
No. overall	No. in season	Title	Directed by	Written by	Original release date	Prod. code
45	1	"Chapter Forty-Five"	Jonathan Pontell	John J. Sakmar & Kerry Lenhart	October 21, 2002	3B01
A new year arrives at Winslow High and new tensions immediately arise. Brooke is caught in the middle when a group of students plan a walkout because the administration has been unable to handle crucial issues such as toxic mold in the bathrooms and overcrowded classrooms. Meanwhile, two new, young teachers, Zach Fischer and Colin Flynn, start at Winslow High. Fischer immediately causes problems with Harper when he fuels the fire of the student protests.
46	2	"Chapter Forty-Six"	Arlene Sanford	David E. Kelley, John J. Sakmar, Kerry Lenhart & Douglas Steinberg	October 28, 2002	3B02
The school is in chaos after the riot, racial abuse is thrown in the direction of Marla, and Guber is surprised with the actions of one of his top students.
47	3	"Chapter Forty-Seven"	Mike Listo	David E. Kelley, John J. Sakmar & Kerry Lenhart	November 4, 2002	3B03
The race attack gets worse, action is to be taken against students who drive dangerously, and Guber has a lot to face up to.
48	4	"Chapter Forty-Eight"	Peter MacNicol	David E. Kelley & Kerry Ehrin	November 11, 2002	3B04
A sex scandal among teens rocks Winslow and prompts a mock trial of the accused instigator, a clean-cut senior who is defended, prosecuted, and judged by his peers.
49	5	"Chapter Forty-Nine"	Robert Yannetti	David E. Kelley, John J. Sakmar & Kerry Lenhart & Kerry Ehrin	November 18, 2002	3B05
Senate's erratic behavior rattles Ronnie and prompts a telling showdown with Harper; pupil misconduct provokes a new teacher, whose youth belies grit.
50	6	"Chapter Fifty"	Jeannot Szwarc	Jason Katims	November 25, 2002	3B06
Violence and compassion commingle in this insightful episode. In the main plot, a rebellious, Irish-American teen squares off against an offended, African-American classmate in a racially incited brawl that distresses their caring teacher and leads to a more contentious fray with principal Harper. In another storylines, Winslow teachers undergo peer evaluations where Ronnie reluctantly grades Zach, with whom she has a somewhat romantic involvement.
51	7	"Chapter Fifty-One"	Mike Listo	Douglas Steinberg	December 2, 2002	3B07
A jailed Harper faces a manslaughter charge in the death of a student's father; a rebellious teen receives unsolicited help from Hanson, who uncovers the youth's dark secret.
52	8	"Chapter Fifty-Two"	Elodie Keene	Jason Katims	December 16, 2002	3B08
This holiday episode is enriched by dramatic confrontations, romantic complications and poignant reconciliations. For openers, the tense situation in a previous installment involving a parish priest and an altar boy yields a startling revelation from Hanson. Guber and Marylin are partnered in an off-campus dance class, Ronnie and Zach are increasingly frustrated in their zealous search for a secret trysting place, and Lipschultz is predictably discomforted by an invitation to attend his black son's family gathering on Christmas Day.
53	9	"Chapter Fifty-Three"	Joe Napolitano	Jason Katims, Lit Katims & Kerry Lenhart	January 6, 2003	3B09
A teen's pregnancy sensitizes Guber; a gang slaying deeply affects Kimberly and her prize student; romantic liaisons have differing impacts on Ronnie and Hanson.
54	10	"Chapter Fifty-Four"	Michael Zinberg	John J. Sakmar, Kerry Lenhart & Jason Katims	January 13, 2003	3B10
Anne Archer plays willful and sultry Patricia Emerson, whose daughter Becky is a student in an English class taught by Colin Flynn. At a home-tutoring session for Becky, Mrs. Emerson comes on to Flynn. It's an attempted seduction that really heats up when Emerson — who says she's related to the poet-essayist Ralph Waldo Emerson — begins interpreting Emily Dickinson's "The Sea" for him as a poem rich in sexual metaphors. Elsewhere, Winslow's basketball coach denies charges that he illegally recruited a star player, who is enamored of Harper's daughter.
55	11	"Chapter Fifty-Five"	Steven Robman	Douglas Steinberg & Jason Katims	January 20, 2003	3B11
Moral and ethical dilemmas surround Flynn's adulterous affair, the college recruitment of Winslow's basketball star, and the plight of a pregnant teen.
56	12	"Chapter Fifty-Six"	Mike Listo	Jason Katims & Karen Wyscarver	February 3, 2003	3B12
Guber's speech team star has an issue, Russell decides on a college, while mixed signals rattle Colin as his affair comes to a close.
57	13	"Chapter Fifty-Seven"	Robert Yannetti	Constance M. Burge & Alicia Martin	February 10, 2003	3B13
Valentine's Day marks the arrival of Guber's watchful mother, awakens a troubled coed's feelings for Kimberly, and trifles with romances among Winslow faculty members.
58	14	"Chapter Fifty-Eight"	Jonathan Pontell	Story by : Kerry Ehrin & Brian S. Hunt; Teleplay by : Kerry Ehrin	February 24, 2003	3B14
American Idol contestant Tamyra Gray makes her TV dramatic debut. Gray plays a shy Winslow student named Aisha, whose solo in an empty study hall awes Marylin, so she persuades Aisha to audition for the upcoming school musical. The tryout is a disaster, but, thanks to Marylin's confidence-building, Aisha gets another shot. In other storylines, the battering of a gay teen prompts Guber to take a stand for tolerance, and a quickening crush on a fellow student ruffles a 12-year-old schoolgirl genius.
59	15	"Chapter Fifty-Nine"	Bethany Rooney	John J. Sakmar, Kerry Lenhart & Jason Katims	March 10, 2003	3B15
Anxiety besets Winslow staffers, scrutinized by the mayor's spy, a teacher's sex scandal is grist for the mill of student TV-journalists, and boyfriend-related tensions affect school-musical star Aisha.
60	16	"Chapter Sixty"	Mel Damski	Jason Katims & Liz Heldens	March 17, 2003	3B16
Emotional Marla imperils a promotion. Rattled Hanson tends to a 4-year-old niece. Conflicted Aisha, recast in the school musical, confronts her jealous boyfriend.
61	17	"Chapter Sixty-One"	Sheldon Larry	Constance M. Burge & Liz Heldens	March 24, 2003	3B17
Tensions surface over Ronnie's new post, Aisha's participation in the school musical and her relationship with J.T., Harvey's required recertification, and Danny's care for his niece.
62	18	"Chapter Sixty-Two"	Jonathan Pontell	David E. Kelley & Jason Katims	March 31, 2003	3B18
Courtroom drama energizes Ronnie, who is defending two teens in a murder arraignment. High test scores by poor students prompt Guber's undercover investigation.
63	19	"Chapter Sixty-Three"	Duane Clark	David E. Kelley & Jason Katims	April 7, 2003	3B19
Sudden fame heartens Ronnie, credited for high exam scores posted at Winslow, yet she's also facing a romantic crisis with Zach. A student-council election tests a shy, awkward teen.
64	20	"Chapter Sixty-Four"	Michael Schultz	Constance M. Burge, Kerry Ehrin, Liz Heldens & Jason Katims	April 28, 2003	3B20
Aisha is shocked when her father, a one-time famous musician but now an alcoholic, makes a surprise visit to Winslow High. He is seriously ill and leaves Aisha a tattered song manuscript. She puts words to the melody, which becomes her rendition of Luther Vandross' "Dance with My Father". Meanwhile, motherhood troubles Marcie, who is taking a parental-training course, and fears for his niece's welfare preoccupy Danny, whose sister is still using drugs.
65	21	"Chapter Sixty-Five"	Mike Listo	Jason Katims	May 5, 2003	3B21
Hanson, looking for a way to increase his chances in adopting his niece, makes a sudden proposal to Claire (Missy Yager). Meanwhile, Guber challenges a student (GQ) who wants to use rap music to show why Shakespeare "sucks"; and Marilyn doesn't trust a record producer (Method Man) who is pushing to sign Aisha to a recording deal. Musical guests Lifehouse perform at Doyle's Bar.
66	22	"Chapter Sixty-Six"	Jonathan Pontell	Jason Katims	May 12, 2003	3B22
When a student writes a letter to Whitney Houston asking her to attend the prom with him, faculty and students are amazed that she accepts. Houston's attendance at the prom causes Aisha, who is set to perform, to get stage fright. Meanwhile, Harper presents a radical way to prevent the firing of teachers for budget reasons and Danny asks Claire's father's permission to marry her.

=== Season 4 (2003–04) ===
No. overall	No. in season	Title	Directed by	Written by	Original release date	Prod. code
67	1	"Chapter Sixty-Seven"	Jonathan Pontell	David E. Kelley	September 19, 2003	4ADU01
Ronnie witnesses an attempted rape, then receives a shock when she presses for legal action on behalf of the victim; Hanson tries to prevent a student from being expelled for drugs.
68	2	"Chapter Sixty-Nine"	Robert Yannetti	Jason Katims	September 26, 2003	4ADU03
After a cheerleader is attacked, blame falls on another student's mother (Sean Young); Carmen goes head to head with a "bad boy" student (Milo Ventimiglia); Hansen copes with a student who says he is the son of God.
69	3	"Chapter Sixty-Eight"	Mike Listo	David E. Kelley	October 3, 2003	4ADU02
A female student files a serious sexual-harassment charge against Danny; a classroom debate over the U.S. involvement in Iraq turns violent; the tension between Harper and Guber over Marylin reaches the boiling point.
70	4	"Chapter Seventy"	Steven Robman	Kerry Ehrin	October 17, 2003	4ADU04
An enraged student slaps Marla's face in front of the class, and Marla slaps her back; Hanson discovers Allison behaves like a bully at school; Carmen asks Harper to remove Jake from her class.
71	5	"Chapter Seventy-One"	Joe Napolitano	Liz Heldens, Russel Friend & Garrett Lerner	October 24, 2003	4ADU05
An investment banker, convicted of securities fraud, avoids jail time by agreeing to community service: teaching math at Winslow High. A sexy and eccentric woman (Sherilyn Fenn) smashes into Guber's car and then crashes her way into his life.
72	6	"Chapter Seventy-Two"	Jonathan Pontell	Kerry Ehrin	October 31, 2003	4ADU06
A student discovers Harper and Marilyn have been secretly dating and threatens to go to the school board; Hanson and Claire try to assist a student who is having trouble with his dad.
73	7	"Chapter Seventy-Three"	Allison Liddi-Brown	Douglas Steinberg & Jason Katims	November 7, 2003	4ADU07
Charlie Bixby (Dennis Miller) takes an unconventional approach when volunteering at a teen hotline; Marla decides to try in vitro fertilization and asks Harper to be the donor; Carmen reveals a secret from her past.
74	8	"Chapter Seventy-Four"	Mike Listo	Liz Heldens	December 5, 2003	4ADU08
Harper decides to call the FBI when he learns that a student has been accessing a terrorist recruitment website from the school library; Ronnie learns that one of her students has HIV.
75	9	"Chapter Seventy-Six"	Elodie Keene	Jason Katims	December 19, 2003	4ADU10
Guber contends with a student who thinks he is Jesus and is using school funds to feed the homeless; Marla mistakenly books R.E.M. for a school fund-raiser.
76	10	"Chapter Seventy-Five"	Robert Yannetti	Russel Friend, Garrett Lerner & Karen Wyscarver	January 9, 2004	4ADU09
Guber discovers the high school drum line's freshman hazing involves physical abuse; a student-produced TV documentary about Ronnie worries her; a father is sentenced to being handcuffed to his son for a week.
77	11	"Chapter Seventy-Seven"	Michael Zinberg	Kerry Ehrin	January 16, 2004	4ADU11
An overachieving student sues the school when she has to share presidency of the honor society with a black student in a wheelchair; Marla begins her in vitro process.
78	12	"Chapter Seventy-Eight"	Bethany Rooney	Russel Friend, Garrett Lerner & Liz Heldens	January 23, 2004	4ADU12
Views on affirmative action divide the students; the teachers hope to quell the resulting tensions by debating the subject in front of the student body. The new art teacher Henry Preston also causes a stir in his first week at Winslow High.
79	13	"Chapter Seventy-Nine"	Patrick Norris	Jason Katims Liz Heldens & Karen Wyscarver	January 30, 2004	4ADU13
Henry gives bad advice to a brainiac student who wants to become an artist. Marla has a miscarriage. Rainy is thrown out of her foster home. Claire and Danny have to face the fact that Danny's sister wants her daughter back.
80	14	"Chapter Eighty"	Michael Rapaport	Douglas Steinberg	March 1, 2005 (TV One)	4ADU14
A former student of Winslow High dies in Iraq while serving the U.S. Army. Principal Harper receives a letter from the deceased student which brings back old memories back to the days when he took care of him and pulled him away from a life in the gutter on the streets. Danny Hanson struggles with a student in his class who has been hacking into the school's computer base; finding out about the teachers' private lives and upcoming tests.
81	15	"Chapter Eighty-One"	Mike Listo	Jason Katims, Kerry Ehrin & Liz Heldens	March 2, 2005 (TV One)	4ADU15
Ronnie catches a male teacher hugging a female student; Hanson worries that he may be a control freak following an incident in his Drivers' Education class; several students are caught photographing themselves nude with only words written across their bodies.

== See also ==
- List of The Practice episodes – includes crossover episode "The Day After"
