= Chapter 26 (Legion) =

- Legion episode
- Episode no.: Season 3 Episode 7
- Directed by: Dana Gonzales
- Written by: Noah Hawley; Olivia Dufault
- Cinematography by: Ben Kutchins
- Editing by: Curtis Thurber
- Production code: XLN03007
- Original air date: August 5, 2019
- Running time: 46 minutes

Guest appearances
- Harry Lloyd as Charles Xavier; Stephanie Corneliussen as Gabrielle Xavier

Episode chronology
← Previous "Chapter 25"	Next → "Chapter 27"
- Legion season 3

"Chapter 26" is the seventh episode of the third season of the American surrealist superhero thriller television series Legion, based on the Marvel Comics character of the same name. It was written by series creator Noah Hawley and co-executive producer Olivia Dufault and directed by Dana Gonzales. It originally aired on FX on August 5, 2019.

The series follows David Haller, a "mutant" diagnosed with schizophrenia at a young age, as he tries to control his psychic powers and combat the sinister forces trying to control him. Eventually, he betrays his former friends at the government agency Division 3, who label him a threat and set off to hunt him down. In the episode, David travels thirty years in the past to meet his father and help him fight Farouk.

According to Nielsen Media Research, the episode was seen by an estimated 0.288 million household viewers and gained a 0.1 ratings share among adults aged 18–49. The episode received positive reviews from critics, who praised the interaction between David and his father and cinematography, although some expressed criticism for its rushed pacing.

== Plot ==
Having sensed him through Cerebro, Charles Xavier flies to Morocco to find Amahl Farouk. Farouk actually expected him, and has a chauffeur pick him up at the airport. At the time hallway, David and Switch find that time is becoming unstable, with a door trapping David in a loop of previous events.

Charles arrives at Farouk's monastery, who welcomes him and invites him for dinner. During dinner, Farouk shows the astral plane to Xavier, teaching him how to use it. Meanwhile, Syd, Cary and Kerry arrive at Charles' mansion, finding Gabrielle with her baby. Syd talks with her, until she realizes that the baby is David himself. Kerry suggests killing him, but Syd is conflicted in doing so, claiming they can still save David through time.

While experiencing visions, Charles is visited by David. After confirming his identity, he takes Charles inside his mind to talk. He then projects to Charles everything that happened in his life, surprising Charles. Later, Charles and David meet with Farouk, as the meeting is a trap so David can kill Farouk. However, Switch starts feeling the side effects of time travel, causing them to constantly jump through many places. During this, Charles discovers the alternate versions of David inside his mind, disturbing him.

Syd talks with Gabrielle about properly raising David, warning her that David could become evil in the future if she does not love him enough. However, the time demons appear and stalk them through the house. While visiting Farouk, Charles discovers that his "children" are vessels that contain his victims. Concluding that he will not stop his nature, Charles reunites with David, with both intending to fight him. Present day Farouk manages to escape from "the time between time", manifesting in the monastery and meeting his past self.

== Production ==
=== Development ===
In July 2019, it was reported that the seventh episode of the season would be titled "Chapter 26", and was to be directed by Dana Gonzales and written by series creator Noah Hawley and co-executive producer Olivia Dufault. This was Hawley's eighteenth writing credit, Dufault's fourth writing credit, and Gonzales' second directing credit.

== Reception ==
=== Viewers ===
In its original American broadcast, "Chapter 26" was seen by an estimated 0.288 million household viewers and gained a 0.1 ratings share among adults aged 18–49, according to Nielsen Media Research. This means that 0.1 percent of all households with televisions watched the episode. This was a 14% decrease in viewership from the previous episode, which was watched by 0.332 million viewers with a 0.1 in the 18-49 demographics.

=== Critical reviews ===
"Chapter 26" received positive reviews from critics. The review aggregator website Rotten Tomatoes reported a 100% approval rating with an average rating of 7/10 for the episode, based on 5 reviews.

Alex McLevy of The A.V. Club gave the episode a "B-" grade and wrote, "It's enervating stuff, but the road to that setup was messy. There's an oddness to the way this episode tells the story of Xavier traveling to meet Farouk for the first time, and how their encounter played out—and not 'odd' in the sense of, 'Hey, it's Legion, everything's a little odd.' In part, it stems from the way Xavier and Gabrielle occupy central parts of the narrative as the show rushes to its conclusion."

Nick Harley of Den of Geek wrote, "Legion's series finale, 'Chapter 27' then appears like it will be a showdown, father and son vs two versions of Amahl Farouk. I'm excited to see how Hawley represents this conflict, as he always eschews traditional battles in the astral plane for something more impressionistic and unexpected. However, the thing I'm most anxious to see in the finale will be how they resolve the story between David and Syd, which has always been the beating heart of the series. If David changes his past, will it just fix everything that's come before? It can't be that neat, can it?" Kevin Lever of Tell Tale TV gave the episode a 4 star rating out of 5 and wrote, "'Chapter 26' does some intricate storytelling by keeping a heavy episode a little light in its heart. What other show would blast Captain Sensible's 'Wot' as a defense mechanism in a character's mind? The fate of the world is in the balance, but it's never been more entertaining and fun to watch."
