= Chapter 27 (Legion) =

- Legion episode
- Episode no.: Season 3 Episode 8
- Directed by: Noah Hawley; John Cameron
- Written by: Noah Hawley; Olivia Dufault
- Cinematography by: Erik Messerschmidt; Alex Disenhof
- Editing by: Regis Kimble
- Production code: XLN03008
- Original air date: August 12, 2019
- Running time: 52 minutes

Guest appearances
- Harry Lloyd as Charles Xavier; Stephanie Corneliussen as Gabrielle Xavier

Episode chronology
← Previous "Chapter 26"	Next → —
- Legion season 3

"Chapter 27" is the series finale of the American surrealist superhero thriller television series Legion, based on the Marvel Comics character of the same name. It is the eighth episode of the third season and was written by series creator Noah Hawley and co-executive producer Olivia Dufault, and directed by Hawley and executive producer John Cameron. It originally aired on FX on August 12, 2019.

The series follows David Haller, a "mutant" diagnosed with schizophrenia at a young age, as he tries to control his psychic powers and combat the sinister forces trying to control him. Eventually, he betrays his former friends at the government agency Division 3, who label him a threat and set off to hunt him down. In the final episode, David and his father Charles Xavier set out to destroy Farouk once and for all.

According to Nielsen Media Research, the episode was seen by an estimated 0.365 million household viewers and gained a 0.1 ratings share among adults aged 18–49. The episode received mostly positive reviews from critics. While some expressed criticism for its rushed story and its reliance on style over substance, there was praise for the closure, performances, cinematography and themes.

== Plot ==
David tells a weakened Switch that he will change everything, and sets out with Charles to meet with past Amahl Farouk. They intercept Farouk, and start a fight inside David's mind.

At the mansion, Gabrielle, Syd, and Kerry are attacked by time demons. To fend them off, Cary and Kerry merge to fight alongside Syd. Back in David's mind, past Farouk manages to fend off David's alternate versions and traps David, mockingly accusing him of being a bad person. Recalling his mother's love for him, David breaks free and strangles the past Farouk.

Switch is found by time demons, and despite fighting, she decides to surrender herself. Her father suddenly appears and elevates her to a higher level of existence, revealing both he and Switch have the ability to control the time demons (who merely function to guard the tributaries of time). Charles confronts the present Farouk in the astral plane, who claims that he traveled back in time to save David. They travel to David's mind as he is about to kill the past Farouk, with Charles taking him to the astral plane. He states that his condition is because of his own fault, so he made a deal with Farouk to allow them to peacefully live as long as they leave him alone, apologizing for failing him. Present Farouk convinces past Farouk to accept the terms, by showing everything that will happen.

Switch stops the demons from attacking Syd, Gabrielle, Cary, Kerry and baby David. She states that now that the past events will be changed, they will disappear and create new versions of themselves. In the monastery, David and Farouk shake hands, signifying the end of their fight. As the new timeline is about to set in, Syd waves goodbye to Cary and Kerry, with both finally separated and embracing. Charles returns home, reconciling with Gabrielle and saying that things will be fine. David goes to his old room, where Syd is looking at baby David. They acknowledge that as the timeline will be different, they will never meet at Clockworks. They both expect better things for each other, and they vanish in front of baby David.

== Production ==
=== Development ===
In June 2018, the series was renewed for a third season. In February 2019, it was announced that the third season would premiere in June 2019, and will serve as the final season of the series. Hawley's plan had always been for three seasons, he stated, "I think endings are what give stories meaning. I always thought about this as a complete story, and it felt like three acts of a story."

In July 2019, it was reported that the series finale would be titled "Chapter 27", and was to be directed by series creator Noah Hawley and executive producer John Cameron, and written by Hawley and co-executive producer Olivia Dufault. This was Hawley's nineteenth writing credit, Dufault's fifth writing credit, Hawley's third directing credit, and Cameron's fourth directing credit. Originally, Hawley wasn't going to direct the episode, citing scheduling conflicts while writing the fourth season of Fargo and working on the post-production for his film Lucy in the Sky. Daniel Sackheim was scheduled to direct the episode, but left after two days after contracting pneumonia. Hawley then directed the episode with the help of executive producer John Cameron.

=== Writing ===
When describing the series finale, Noah Hawley said, "I just wanted to deliver a conclusion to the story that felt both as playful and inventive as the rest of the series, while still delivering a meaningful and human ending to this story."

The final scene depicts baby David, which was also the first scene of the series. Hawley stated that he felt after the second season, the last image of the series would involve the first image. For the scene, the series used "Happy Jack" by The Who, with Hawley describing it as "It's complete in that it's all starting all over again, so who knows what will happen the second time around."

Regarding the outcome of the new timeline, Hawley explained "We live in a world where this nature versus nurture question is yet to be resolved. And it's probably both. But my sense of the timeline is that Xavier and Gabrielle are going to remember what happened, and so they'll be able to raise David quite deliberately knowing the path that he ended up on, and wanting to avoid that for him. And that may involve for his mother getting some help for herself in order to be a better role model for him, et cetera. So the great thing about it ending on that kind of loop is that [idea of] 'press the button and watch again, maybe something different will happen.'"

Hawley also rejected the idea that the finale would set up possible storylines for the Marvel Cinematic Universe, saying "given my level of being occupied, I wasn't really up for a lot of tangential conversations about things, and I'm not in the inner circle for the reinvention, or the Disney-fication, of what the X-Men is likely to be."

== Reception ==
=== Viewers ===
In its original American broadcast, "Chapter 27" was seen by an estimated 0.365 million household viewers and gained a 0.1 ratings share among adults aged 18–49, according to Nielsen Media Research. This means that 0.1 percent of all households with televisions watched the episode. This was a 26% increase in viewership from the previous episode, which was watched by 0.288 million viewers with a 0.1 in the 18-49 demographics.

=== Critical reviews ===
"Chapter 27" received mostly positive reviews from critics. The review aggregator website Rotten Tomatoes reported a 100% approval rating with an average rating of 7.8/10 for the episode, based on 6 reviews.

Alicia Lutes of IGN gave the episode a "good" 7.1 out of 10 and wrote in her verdict, "Legion took big risks and it resulted in some big rewards over the course of its three seasons. In its series finale, everyone came face-to-face with the future and the past, and they were all forced to work separately, but together, in order to uncover a potential, new future. True to form, the Hawley series did not go quietly into that good night, chockablock with terror and humor and musical whimsy oozing out of every pore. Whether or not that worked is a matter of opinion, but it was undeniably unique in its construct and execution, making it trippily worth your time. Though we wish it did more to avoid taking the 'easy' route, Legion ended on a hopeful note, which is truly surprising if you've watched the series at all up to this point."

Alex McLevy of The A.V. Club gave the episode a "B" grade and wrote, "The sense of uplift and moral simplicity argued for by the ending is so genuine, it feels churlish to point out the ways in which it might be compromised. And yet the world created by Legion has been so murky and full of messy ambiguities, so touched by the very notion that nothing as simple as 'a clear answer' could ever sufficiently account for any philosophical or existential question about what it means to live a good life, that to suddenly end on a note that tries to sweep the board clean and say 'Let's do it all over, but better' with hardly an implication of the too-broad generalities implied comes across as rushed, at best."

Alan Sepinwall of Rolling Stone wrote, "Legion creator Noah Hawley treated these three deeply strange, often riveting, occasionally indecipherable seasons as his arena of infinite promise. Coherence — both narrative and emotional — always came across as secondary to presenting the wildest and most memorable imagery possible. Why fight with a knife when you can transform into a samurai, or a tank, instead? Why explain things when you can stage a rap battle? Bigger, more colorful, and more bizarre was always the order of the day, particularly as the series' facility with digital effects increased over time to make the powers of title character David Haller (Dan Stevens) appear disturbingly casual and real." Angelica Jade Bastién of Vulture wrote, "The message Legion lands on in its closing moments — a hopeful one that suggests that we can remake ourselves and even the world into something better — is perhaps its boldest gambit. Ultimately, Legion is a series of bristling enchantment and wonder, even when it failed to live up to the fascinating threads of family and mental illness that it wove into its story of superhero power."

Nick Harley of Den of Geek gave the episode a 4 star rating out of 5 wrote, "The final episode of Legion isn't flawless, but flawless isn't how Legion lived. Still, the series was breathtaking in its visuals, thrillingly off-kilter in its risks (like devoting so much of its runtime to musical interludes), and oddly poignant in its quiet moments. There's no telling if or when we'll get another superhero series as refreshingly different as Legion, so instead of nitpicking its final choices, I'd rather sing the praises of its singular vision and ambition." Kevin Lever of Tell Tale TV gave the episode a 3.5 star rating out of 5 and wrote, "'Chapter 27' ends a series that for a superhero series, is a complete arthouse experiment. It's downright shocking that FX allowed all of this, because the show takes risk after risk to tell a story in an unorthodox way and becomes something memorable and endlessly unique. Ending a show like that is a feat, and it ended positively and with a key focus on character."
