= Legion season 3 =

Legion
- Season 3
- Promotional poster
- Showrunner: Noah Hawley
- Starring: Dan Stevens; Rachel Keller; Aubrey Plaza; Bill Irwin; Navid Negahban; Jeremie Harris; Amber Midthunder; Lauren Tsai; Hamish Linklater
- No. of episodes: 8

Release
- Original network: FX
- Original release: June 24 – August 12, 2019

Season chronology
- ← Previous; Season 2

The third and final season of the American surrealist superhero thriller television series Legion premiered on FX on June 24, 2019, and concluded August 12, totaling eight episodes. The series is based on the Marvel Comics character David Haller, a mutant diagnosed with schizophrenia at a young age, who learns that his illness may actually be powerful psychic abilities. In the final season, David recruits a time-traveling mutant to help him rewrite the past to fix his life, all while his former friends hunt him down. It was produced by FX Productions in association with Marvel Television, with Noah Hawley serving as showrunner.

Dan Stevens stars as David, with Rachel Keller, Aubrey Plaza, Bill Irwin, Navid Negahban, Jeremie Harris, Amber Midthunder and Hamish Linklater also returning from previous seasons to star. They are joined by newcomer Lauren Tsai. Legion's third season was ordered by FX in June 2018, and was confirmed to be the final season in February 2019. The season's set design and costumes drew heavy inspiration from the psychedelia aesthetic of the 1960s and 70s, and more musical sequences were integrated into the narrative.

The season received critical acclaim, with many praising its visuals, themes, use of music, performances, and sense of closure. Many deemed it a satisfying conclusion to the series, though some criticized the pacing of the final two episodes.

== Episodes ==
No. overall	No. in season	Title	Directed by	Written by	Original release date	Prod. code	U.S. viewers (millions)
20	1	"Chapter 20"	Andrew Stanton	Noah Hawley and Nathaniel Halpern	June 24, 2019	XLN03001	0.377
A young mutant with the nickname Switch has the ability to create doorways that can allow for time travel. Unsatisfied with her life, she discovers clues that eventually lead her to a cult run by David and Lenny. David explains to Switch that he has been searching for a time traveler. Switch's initial meeting with David is interrupted by the invasion of Division 3 agents, who murder most of the cultists, and Syd, who delivers a killing shot to David. Switch time travels back to try to prevent the massacre but despite things going slightly differently, David is once more killed by Syd. Switch again time travels but is intercepted by Farouk. After a failed attempt to recruit her, Farouk returns to his allies in the flying headquarters of Division 3. After Switch mentions that Syd has killed David out of two failed timelines, Farouk attempts to talk Syd out of raiding David's cult, but is unsuccessful. In a third timeline, Division 3 (led by the Mainframe inhabited in a robot that resembles Ptonomy) conduct the raid on David's compound but instead discover that the entire building has been removed due to the preemptive intervention of Switch and David.
21	2	"Chapter 21"	Carlos López Estrada	Noah Hawley and Olivia Dufault & Kate Thulin	July 1, 2019	XLN03002	0.381
Now fully believing Switch's time travel powers, David attempts to travel through one of her doorways but finds that he is incapable of entering. Via astral projection, David tells Syd that he plans to go back in time and fix everything; Syd, who still does not forgive him for taking advantage of her, in turn tells him that his time-traveling intention is just a smokescreen, and his character is the reason why the world ends. Enraged by this, his anger poisons his cult members from blissful happiness to a furious state. David and Lenny realize that they must supercharge Switch to allow her greater abilities. Eventually, Lenny manages to capture Cary. David combines drugs and mind control to trick Cary into willingly experimenting on Switch to make her powerful enough to allow David to time travel.
22	3	"Chapter 22"	John Cameron	Nathaniel Halpern	July 8, 2019	XLN03003	0.370
Thirty years in the past, Charles and Gabrielle Xavier live in happiness with their newborn David. Charles was a war veteran who used his telepathy to survive and Gabrielle was a survivor of the Holocaust who was brought out of catatonia by Charles. Meeting in a psychiatric hospital, the two fell in love. After building a prototype Cerebro to boost his telepathy powers, Charles discovers a powerful mutant named Farouk and sets off to Morocco to meet him. Left alone in the house, Gabrielle suffers from several strange delusions, some of which are brought on by the attempted time travel intervention of David and Switch. David is frustrated to discover that, despite attempts to prevent his infant self from possession, he is unable to influence the past or even manifest physically. Charles telephones Gabrielle in a panic to explain that meeting Farouk was a mistake and makes plans to immediately return home. Gabrielle's visions become increasingly nightmarish due to the now astral projection of Farouk's spirit as well as present day David's desperate attempts to prevent this. David finally manages to manifest as a ghost and attempts to warn Gabrielle, but at that moment Charles returns and telepathically expels David and Switch back to the present. Switch is physically and mentally drained from such extreme time travel, but David demands they travel back immediately. Back in the past, Charles comforts Gabrielle who seemingly reverted to a catatonic state, while both are oblivious to the fact that Farouk has successfully possessed baby David.
23	4	"Chapter 23"	Daniel Kwan	Olivia Dufault and Charles Yu	July 15, 2019	XLN03004	0.277
As a result of David and Switch's meddling in the past, time itself becomes unstable, resulting in time loops for both David's cult and Division 3 (as well as the viewer, with the broadcast briefly switching to an episode of The Shield). It also attracts time demons, creatures who feed on time and manifest when Switch travels too far back. The time demons attack David and he awakens in a concentration camp next to his mother, but it is an illusion made by the time demons. Others are also tortured by illusions, with Syd coming across a younger version of herself and Lenny being forced to witness the rapid birth, aging and death of her daughter. Cary breaks free from David's mind control, and he escapes David's facility with Switch. David eventually scares the time demons away, but is enraged by Switch's escape.
24	5	"Chapter 24"	Arkasha Stevenson	Olivia Dufault and Ben H. Winters	July 22, 2019	XLN03005	0.288
David hijacks a Division 3 bus and manipulates the memory of Daniel, Clark's husband, to learn that Switch is aboard the Division 3 airship. Lenny, distraught from her ordeal with the time demons, calls David out on his narcissistic and villainous acts, as well as her own, before she slits her own throat and dies by suicide in front of him. Meanwhile, Cary builds a hibernation chamber for Switch to hide her from David. Ptonomy suggests traveling to outer space to get out of David's teleportation range, and Division 3 agrees against the wishes of Farouk, who wants to face David directly. Farouk intentionally provokes David, who discovers their location. David and his cult make it to the airship, and he personally kills Clark by throwing him into space. David contacts Syd, who gives up Switch's location, and he vows to change the past and undo everything. Syd tricks him into allowing her to use her powers to make them swap bodies; however, David's other personalities, who refer to themselves as Legion, manage to overpower Syd as they bring David back to his body and wipe Syd's mind to prevent her from swapping bodies again. He retrieves Switch, who then traps Farouk in the 'time between time'. David and Switch once again travel to the past, with David stating he now has a new plan.
25	6	"Chapter 25"	John Cameron	Noah Hawley	July 29, 2019	XLN03006	0.332
Oliver finds Syd's lost mind in the astral plane, manifesting as a baby. He and Melanie decide to raise her, not realizing who she is. They also adopt Cynthia, a woman who is in the astral plane due to 'losing her innocence'. Cynthia is spirited away by Jerome, a sinister entity also known as The Wolf, who aims to corrupt those he finds in the astral plane. As the astral Syd ages, she has nightmares about what the real world Syd has experienced. Astral Syd encounters a now drug-addicted Cynthia, who unsuccessfully attempts to recruit her to The Wolf's control. Instead, Astral Syd vows to save Cynthia. She and Oliver kidnap Cynthia, only for The Wolf to track them down and Cynthia to willingly leave with him. Oliver and Melanie encourage a now full-grown Syd to return to the real world, and she awakens on the Division 3 airship. With the time door still open, Cary creates devices that allow himself, Syd, and Kerry to travel back in time to go after David, but only after Cary absorbs Kerry's wounds to restore her to full strength.
26	7	"Chapter 26"	Dana Gonzales	Noah Hawley and Olivia Dufault	August 5, 2019	XLN03007	0.288
Back in the past, Charles travels to Morocco to meet with Farouk after using Cerebro to find him; Farouk foresees his arrival and teaches Charles about the astral plane. Meanwhile, Syd, Cary, and Kerry encounter Gabrielle in the past, and Syd realizes she is David's mother. Syd refuses to kill baby David, convinced that if she stays in the past, she can help raise him to be a different person. Time, however, is destabilizing again, attracting the time demons. David travels back to Charles's location and teleports the two of them inside of David's mind. David reveals to Charles everything that has happened to this point in David's life. Warning Charles that the meeting with Farouk is a trap, David poses as a fellow soldier with the intention of killing Farouk; Charles is hesitant, until he discovers that Farouk's 'children' are little more than vessels containing Farouk's victims. The time demons arrive and wreak havoc, made worse by Switch having overexerted herself. The present-day Farouk escapes from the 'time between time' and travels back to join forces with his past-self.
27	8	"Chapter 27"	Noah Hawley and John Cameron	Noah Hawley and Olivia Dufault	August 12, 2019	XLN03008	0.365
With the time demons causing chaos, Cary and Kerry merge to fight them alongside Syd. Severely weakened, Switch surrenders herself to the time demons, but her father appears and elevates her to a higher level of existence, revealing both he and Switch have the ability to control the time demons (who merely function to guard the tributaries of time). Switch stops the time demons and saves Syd, Cary, Kerry, Gabrielle and baby David. David fights past Farouk using the many fractured personalities within his subconscious, but past Farouk overpowers them and traps David, mockingly accusing him of being a bad person. David escapes, using Gabrielle as inspiration. Charles and present Farouk travel to the astral plane, where present Farouk admits that he actually traveled back to help David. Charles prevents David from killing past Farouk, telling David he struck a deal with present Farouk to keep the peace. Present Farouk reveals the future to his defiant past self and David, both Charles and the Farouks form a truce. Switch reveals to Syd that David's actions, while saving the world, will also create new versions of David and Syd, and the old ones will disappear. Cary and an aged Kerry reunite, now separated from each other. Charles returns home and reconciles with Gabrielle. David and Syd speak for the final time, both expressing hope that their new selves will flourish, and they vanish as baby David looks on.

== Cast and characters ==
=== Main ===
- Dan Stevens as David Haller / Legion
- Rachel Keller as Sydney "Syd" Barrett
- Aubrey Plaza as Lenny Busker
- Bill Irwin as Cary Loudermilk
- Navid Negahban as Amahl Farouk / Shadow King
- Jeremie Harris as Ptonomy Wallace
- Amber Midthunder as Kerry Loudermilk
- Lauren Tsai as Jia-yi / Switch
- Hamish Linklater as Clark Debussy

=== Special guest ===
- Jean Smart as Melanie Bird
- Jemaine Clement as Oliver Bird

=== Recurring ===
- Harry Lloyd as Charles Xavier
- Stephanie Corneliussen as Gabrielle Xavier

=== Guest ===
- Jason Mantzoukas as Jerome / Wolf

== Production ==
=== Development ===
In June 2018, the series was renewed for a third season. In February 2019, it was announced that the third season would premiere in June 2019, and will serve as the final season of the series. Hawley's plan had always been for three seasons, he stated, "I think endings are what give stories meaning. I always thought about this as a complete story, and it felt like three acts of a story." He continued:

What the show is following is this cycle of mental illness. We met David [Dan Stevens] who had been at his lowest point and tried to kill himself, then he meets Syd [Rachel Keller] and he gets balanced out. He's on his meds. He gets out and everything's going great for a while, and he thinks maybe I don't need these meds. He goes off the meds and spirals down, which is where we find him now," Hawley said. "The question now is can he get back to some kind of good place, or is he gone for good? Once we tell that story it feels like we'd be going back to the beginning of the cycle.

The season consists of eight episodes.

=== Casting ===
Returning from previous seasons to star are Dan Stevens as David Haller, Rachel Keller as Sydney "Syd" Barrett, Aubrey Plaza as Lenny Busker, Bill Irwin as Cary Loudermilk, Navid Negahban as Amahl Farouk / Shadow King, Jeremie Harris as Ptonomy Wallace, Amber Midthunder as Kerry Loudermilk, and Hamish Linklater as Clark Debussy. In January 2019, Lauren Tsai was cast as Switch, "a young mutant whose secret ability serves as the key to executing David Haller's plan". She is loosely based on the Marvel Comics character of the same name who was male. In February, it was announced that the characters Gabrielle Haller and Professor X would appear played by Stephanie Corneliussen and Harry Lloyd, respectively. Jean Smart and Jemaine Clement also return in special guest roles as Melanie and Oliver Bird in "Chapter 25".

=== Design ===
Reinforced by the idea of David leading a cult, inspirations for set design as well as clothing were drawn from psychedelic visuals from the 1960s and 70s, all while integrating with modern-day elements to avoid dating the series.

Costume designer Robert Blackman continued the theme of mixing fashion from different decades, with prominent features from psychedelic 60s/70s and modern-day fashion. Each character's outfits were updated, with the color palette for each character changed. As the leader of his group, Haller's style resembles that of a guru, particularly his orange tunic. As the second-line leader of the girl group, Busker wears more feminine, violet/blue articles of clothing. Barrett wears predominantly black, drawing stylistic inspirations from Marianne Faithfull. Cary and Kerry Loudermilk both maintain the color palette, although Cary wears more neutral colors while Kerry wears navy and brown. As Wallace has now become a vehicle for the Mainframe, Wallace's clothing has become more muted in color. Other changes include Debussy wearing aubergine suits and Farouk wearing three-piece suits of various neutral colors. With timeless visuals enabled more so by introduction of new character Switch, her timeless style is drawn from mixing Harajuku fashion with pop elements.

New production designer Marco Niro, who worked on Mayans M.C., drew inspirations from his studies and travels to envision new set designs for the show. Hawley and Niro discussed the integration of different time periods and locations as well as how the Enlightenment House does not need to obey the laws of physics, as seen by the blue energy that flows through the whole house. When designing the Division 3 headquarters, Hawley only told Niro he needed a flying fortress; Niro designed an airship for Division 3, with mythological symbols from cultures and references to books and art from his journeys added to the airship set. To create the hall of time in which Switch travels, an elegant shape was applied to the hallway, to which a forced perspective is done to invoke a sense of endlessly traveling forwards or backwards in time.

=== Music ===
Composer Jeff Russo returned to compose for the third season. A soundtrack album for the season featuring Russo's score and reimagined covers was released digitally on December 18, 2020. All music by Jeff Russo, except where noted:

Legion: Finalmente (Music from Season 3/Original Television Series Soundtrack)
No.	Title	Artist	Length
1.	"Switch 2.0"		5:12
2.	"Syd Theme S3"		8:05
3.	"Lenny's Life and Loss"		2:08
4.	"Sarod Island"		1:54
5.	"Street Squirrel"		1:23
6.	"This Is the End"		2:01
7.	"A Pagan Place"	Jeff Russo & Noah Hawley	5:51
8.	"Can't Get There from Here"	Russo & Hawley	7:09
9.	"Cinnamon Girl"	Russo & Hawley	3:51
10.	"Mother"	Russo feat. Dan Stevens & Stephanie Corneliussen	6:11
11.	"Peace, Love & Understanding"	Russo & Hawley	4:27
12.	"Rap Battle"	Russo feat. Jemaine Clement & Jason Mantzoukas	2:37

== Release ==
=== Broadcast ===
The season began airing on FX on June 24, 2019, and consists of eight episodes.

== Reception ==
=== Critical response ===
The review aggregator website Rotten Tomatoes reported a 93% approval rating for the third season, with an average rating of 7.9 out of 10 based on 71 reviews. The website's critical consensus reads, "In its final season, Legion remains a singular piece of visually arresting, mind-bending television that never fails to surprise." Metacritic, which uses a weighted average, assigned a score of 72 out of 100 based on six critics, indicating "generally favorable" reviews.

David Bianculli of NPR praised the series and wrote, "Legion uses visuals, editing, music and sound better than almost any series on television. And I don't just mean any series now — I mean ever. I've seen the first half of this final season, and that's even more true than before." Ben Travers of IndieWire wrote a generally positive review and gave it a "B" grade, writing, "Hawley's series remains ambitious to the end, accepting the flaws that come with such big dreams and daring to keep dreaming bigger. The result is imperfect, but mesmerizing in just enough scenes to keep you coming back for more. Those short stories are adding up to something, and even if Legion isn't the sum of its parts, some of those parts are spectacular on their own."

=== Ratings ===
Viewership and ratings per episode of Legion season 3
No.	Title	Air date	Rating (18–49)	Viewers (millions)	DVR (18–49)	DVR viewers (millions)	Total (18–49)	Total viewers (millions)
1	"Chapter 20"	June 24, 2019	0.1	0.377	—N/a	—N/a	—N/a	—N/a
2	"Chapter 21"	July 1, 2019	0.1	0.381	0.2	0.302	0.3	0.683
3	"Chapter 22"	July 8, 2019	0.1	0.370	—N/a	—N/a	—N/a	—N/a
4	"Chapter 23"	July 15, 2019	0.1	0.277	—N/a	0.282	—N/a	0.560
5	"Chapter 24"	July 22, 2019	0.1	0.288	—N/a	—N/a	—N/a	—N/a
6	"Chapter 25"	July 29, 2019	0.1	0.332	—N/a	—N/a	—N/a	—N/a
7	"Chapter 26"	August 5, 2019	0.1	0.288	—N/a	0.237	—N/a	0.526
8	"Chapter 27"	August 12, 2019	0.1	0.365	—N/a	—N/a	—N/a	—N/a
