= Chapter 24 (Legion) =

- Legion episode
- Episode no.: Season 3 Episode 5
- Directed by: Arkasha Stevenson
- Written by: Olivia Dufault; Ben H. Winters
- Cinematography by: Dana Gonzales
- Editing by: Curtis Thurber
- Production code: XLN03005
- Original air date: July 22, 2019
- Running time: 41 minutes

Guest appearance
- Keir O'Donnell as Daniel Debussy

Episode chronology
← Previous "Chapter 23"	Next → "Chapter 25"
- Legion season 3

"Chapter 24" is the fifth episode of the third season of the American surrealist superhero thriller television series Legion, based on the Marvel Comics character of the same name. It was written by co-executive producer Olivia Dufault and producer Ben H. Winters and directed by Arkasha Stevenson. It originally aired on FX on July 22, 2019.

The series follows David Haller, a "mutant" diagnosed with schizophrenia at a young age, as he tries to control his psychic powers and combat the sinister forces trying to control him. Eventually, he betrays his former friends at the government agency Division 3, who label him a threat and set off to hunt him down. In the episode, David sets out to find Switch and save her from Division 3, no matter how many people he has to kill to do so.

According to Nielsen Media Research, the episode was seen by an estimated 0.288 million household viewers and gained a 0.1 ratings share among adults aged 18–49. The episode received critical acclaim, with many praising the performances, pacing, narrative and conflicting nature of the characters.

== Plot ==
Daniel Debussy is traveling in a van, protected by Vermillion. The van is intercepted by David, who kills the Vermillion and confronts him, erasing all of Daniel's memories to find the memory of where Switch currently is. Daniel reveals Switch to be on the airship, but cannot remember his own name or past.

David returns to his cult, killing many when he can't find Lenny. Lenny, affected by the time demons, claims that David is to blame for the death of her girlfriend and unborn child as well as everything wrong with her. She refuses to hear to David's plans to change the past, and stabs herself in the neck, dying after blood loss. At the airship, Switch is given a hibernation chamber to avoid David. However, Division 3 is still concerned that David could teleport to their airship. Ptonomy then decides to elevate the airship and send it to outer space, where David cannot reach them. Despite Farouk opposing the decision, Division 3 order the airship to reach space.

Alone, Farouk telepathically communicates with David, provoking him into finding their location. With his cultists, David infiltrates the airship, killing most of the soldiers. David finds Clark and throws him into the space, killing him. He then finds Syd in her bedroom, telling her that Farouk informed him and that he plans to change the past. Syd acknowledges that they were manipulated by Farouk and claims she still loves him. She touches him, swapping bodies.

Now in David's body, Syd distracts some of the cultists so Kerry can kill them. However, David's alternate versions in his mind torment Syd, proclaiming themselves as "Legion". They take control of the body, wipe Syd's memories and bring David back to his body. David finds Switch in her chamber, but is stopped by Farouk, who mocks him. David manages to get Switch to wake up, and she sends Farouk through a doorway, sending him to "the time between the time". Switch is disturbed by David's nature of killing, but he convinces her to join him in his new plan to undo everything, telling her that he has a new plan in mind.

== Production ==
=== Development ===
In June 2019, it was reported that the fifth episode of the season would be titled "Chapter 24", and was to be directed by Arkasha Stevenson and written by co-executive producer Olivia Dufault and producer Ben H. Winters. This was Dufault's third writing credit, Winters' first writing credit, and Stevenson's first directing credit.

== Reception ==
=== Viewers ===
In its original American broadcast, "Chapter 24" was seen by an estimated 0.288 million household viewers and gained a 0.1 ratings share among adults aged 18–49, according to Nielsen Media Research. This means that 0.1 percent of all households with televisions watched the episode. This was a slight increase in viewership from the previous episode, which was watched by 0.277 million viewers with a 0.1 in the 18-49 demographics.

=== Critical reviews ===
"Chapter 24" received extremely positive reviews from critics. The review aggregator website Rotten Tomatoes reported a 100% approval rating with an average rating of 8/10 for the episode, based on 5 reviews.

Alex McLevy of The A.V. Club gave the episode a "B" grade and wrote, "Switch's allegiance is fascinating to watch unfold. She seems to understand the people of Division are trying to do the right thing, but they also have the Shadow King."

Nick Harley of Den of Geek gave the episode a 4 star rating out of 5 wrote, "'Chapter 24' may have left me worrying about how time travel could be used to help the show cheat its way to a convenient ending, and whether I'm supposed to feel these losses or expect things all to be wiped clean, but I have to give Noah Hawley more credit than that. He's not going to bright side this one or cut corners, he knows this is all more complicated than that." Kevin Lever of Tell Tale TV gave the episode a 4.5 star rating out of 5 and wrote, "'Chapter 24' strategically ends almost every thread so that what comes next is completely in the air. It's a bold move that really makes the sky the limit. With David and Switch taking off back into time, and the time demons likely out for vengeance against David, the sky truly is the limit on what can possibly come next. That's the sign of a great drama, and with this episode and this season, Legion is making a strong case for being one of the true greats."
