= Chapter 21 (Legion) =

- Legion episode
- Episode no.: Season 3 Episode 2
- Directed by: Carlos López Estrada
- Written by: Noah Hawley; Olivia Dufault; Kate Thupin
- Cinematography by: Polly Morgan
- Editing by: Todd Desrosiers
- Production code: XLN03002
- Original air date: July 1, 2019
- Running time: 43 minutes

Episode chronology
← Previous "Chapter 20"	Next → "Chapter 22"
- Legion season 3

"Chapter 21" is the second episode of the third season of the American surrealist superhero thriller television series Legion, based on the Marvel Comics character of the same name. It was written by series creator Noah Hawley, co-executive producer Olivia Dufault, and co-producer Kate Thulin and directed by Carlos López Estrada. It originally aired on FX on July 1, 2019.

The series follows David Haller, a "mutant" diagnosed with schizophrenia at a young age, as he tries to control his psychic powers and combat the sinister forces trying to control him. Eventually, he betrays his former friends at the government agency Division 3, who label him a threat and set off to hunt him down. In the episode, David finds that Switch's powers won't allow him to pass the barrier to time travel, prompting him to get help from Cary.

According to Nielsen Media Research, the episode was seen by an estimated 0.381 million household viewers and gained a 0.1 ratings share among adults aged 18–49. The episode received mostly positive reviews from critics, who praised the character development, performances and directing.

== Plot ==
After teleporting the compound, David talks with Switch about her time travel powers. She opens a doorway to show it, but David is unable to enter, despite Switch attempting to get him inside.

Onboard the Division 3 aircraft, Clark interrogates a member of David's cult about his whereabouts. When he refuses to elaborate, he is dropped from the aircraft with a parachute. He is picked up by Lenny, unaware that Clark planted a tracking unit on him. Meanwhile, David and Syd communicate through astral projections. David states the community is used to help more people in trouble, something that Syd rebuffs. He claims he will use time travel to fix everything, but Syd proclaims that he is the problem who fails to acknowledge that he will end the world. This affects David, whose emotions are the source of drugs that the cult uses, causing them to become aggressive.

Lenny takes the member to a tea party in the woods, which is inspired by Alice's Adventures in Wonderland, to drug him. Division 3 agents arrive and capture the members, but find no trace of Lenny. Lenny sneaks in and steals one of the cars, locking Cary inside. Cary is taken to the compound, where he escapes his containment room by fooling a stoned member and encounters David. David states that he wants Cary to create a device that will allow Switch to increase her power and allow David to time travel.

Cary is drugged by Lenny and is subsequently aligned with David in a process similar to him and Kerry. Cary accepts to help Switch, being given a new lab to start working. David, through Cary, states that this will allow him to save the world.

== Production ==
=== Development ===
In June 2019, it was reported that the second episode of the season would be titled "Chapter 21", and was to be directed by Carlos López Estrada and written by series creator Noah Hawley, co-executive producer Olivia Dufault, and co-producer Kate Thulin. This was Hawley's sixteenth writing credit, Dufault's first writing credit, Thulin's first writing credit, and Estrada's first directing credit.

== Reception ==
=== Viewers ===
In its original American broadcast, "Chapter 21" was seen by an estimated 0.381 million household viewers and gained a 0.1 ratings share among adults aged 18–49, according to Nielsen Media Research. This means that 0.1 percent of all households with televisions watched the episode. This was a slight increase in viewership from the previous episode, which was watched by 0.377 million viewers with a 0.1 in the 18-49 demographics.

=== Critical reviews ===
"Chapter 21" received mostly positive reviews from critics. The review aggregator website Rotten Tomatoes reported a 100% approval rating with an average rating of 7.7/10 for the episode, based on 5 reviews.

Alex McLevy of The A.V. Club gave the episode a "B" grade and wrote, "The hunt is on, and with it, Legion is delivering some of the most straightforward plotting since the first half of season one. But the darkness remains, and if there were any uncertainty on that front, Amahl Farouk is here to make sure it sticks. He's trying to convince Syd to operate as a sort of emotional Trojan Horse — to pretend to become intimately involved with David again, the better to slide a knife between his shoulder blades. It's bleak, disturbing stuff, and Syd knows it. But considering the Shadow King is walking around Division like he owns the place, it's anyone's guess how much his powers have already worked their magic. Maybe everyone there should take a listen to Switch's lessons about time travel, chapter 20: 'Consider the consequences of your actions.' They don’t always go as planned."

Nick Harley of Den of Geek gave the episode a 4 star rating out of 5 and wrote, "Though it's a shorter episode, 'Chapter 21' does a good job of piggybacking on last week's episode to set the stage for the remainder of the season. David is set on trying to 'save the world' while Division 3 looks for a way to get to David that circumvents Switch's abilities. The only thing that I miss this week is the use of Switch as the POV character, but I suppose there's time for that device to return down the line." Kevin Lever of Tell Tale TV gave the episode a 4 star rating out of 5 and wrote, "'Chapter 21' comes as the great settling of the dust, an episode where the lay of the land and what's to come is more distinguishable. There's likely to be some surprises along the way, what with time travel and all, but it's setting up for a large-scale endgame of David and Syd trying to find their own peace. With how this show goes, though, there will surely be some side effects to finding that peace."
