= Legion (TV series) =

2017–2019 Marvel Television series

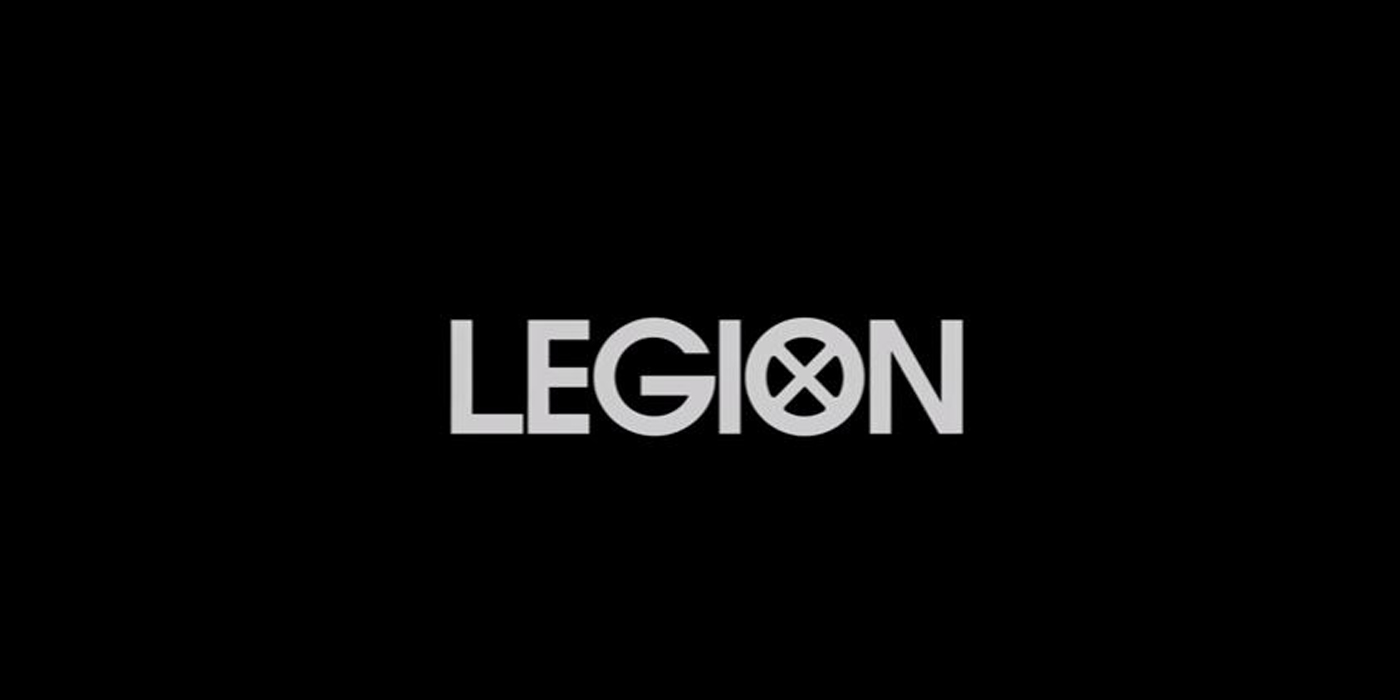
- Genre: Drama; Psychological thriller; Science fiction; Superhero; Surrealism
- Created by: Noah Hawley
- Based on: Legion by: Chris Claremont; Bill Sienkiewicz
- Showrunner: Noah Hawley
- Starring: Dan Stevens; Rachel Keller; Aubrey Plaza; Bill Irwin; Jeremie Harris; Amber Midthunder; Katie Aselton; Jean Smart; Navid Negahban; Jemaine Clement; Hamish Linklater; Lauren Tsai
- Narrated by: Jon Hamm (season 2)
- Composer: Jeff Russo
- Country of origin: United States
- Original language: English
- No. of seasons: 3
- No. of episodes: 27

Production
- Executive producers: Noah Hawley; John Cameron; Lauren Shuler Donner; Bryan Singer (season 1); Simon Kinberg; Steve Blackman; Jeph Loeb; Jim Chory; Alan Fine; Stan Lee; Joe Quesada; Karim Zreik
- Producers: Brian Leslie Parker; Regis Kimble; Erik Holmberg (seasons 2–3); Craig Yahata (seasons 2–3); Ben H. Winters (season 3)
- Production locations: British Columbia, Canada (season 1); Los Angeles, California (seasons 2–3)
- Cinematography: Dana Gonzales; Craig Wrobleski
- Running time: 44–68 minutes
- Production companies: 26 Keys Productions; The Donners' Company; Bad Hat Harry Productions (season 1); Kinberg Genre; Marvel Television; FX Productions

Original release
- Network: FX
- Release: February 8, 2017 – August 12, 2019

Legion is an American surrealist superhero television series created by Noah Hawley for FX, based on the Marvel Comics character Legion. It was produced by FX Productions in association with Marvel Television, with Hawley serving as showrunner, and ran for three seasons from February 8, 2017, to August 12, 2019. It is set in a universe parallel to the X-Men film series.

Dan Stevens stars as David Haller, a mutant diagnosed with schizophrenia at a young age. The series follows David as he tries to control his psychic powers and combat the sinister forces trying to manipulate him to their own ends. Rachel Keller, Aubrey Plaza, Bill Irwin, Jeremie Harris, Amber Midthunder, Katie Aselton, and Jean Smart also starred, later being joined by Jemaine Clement, Hamish Linklater, Navid Negahban, and Lauren Tsai.

FX and Marvel Television announced a new collaboration to create a television series based on the Marvel Comics character Legion in October 2015, with Hawley signed on to write and direct the pilot. He wanted to show Haller as an "unreliable narrator" and filmed the series through the character's distorted view of reality. The series incorporates a blend of retro and modern aesthetic, unconventional filmmaking techniques, and musical sequences.

All three seasons of Legion were praised by critics for their distinct narrative structure, experimental visual style, and unique approach to the superhero genre, though some have criticized it as prioritizing style over substance.

== Premise ==
David Haller was diagnosed with schizophrenia at a young age and has been a patient in various psychiatric hospitals since. He was committed to the latest facility by his adoptive sister, Amy Haller. After Haller has an encounter with fellow patient Syd Barrett, he is confronted with the possibility that there may be more to him than mental illness. Another incident led to the death of his friend Lenore "Lenny" Busker. Hunted by the government agency Division 3 in the first season, Haller is saved by Syd and a group of mutants at a facility called Summerland, who explain that he is also a psychic mutant. Haller eventually discovers that his mind is infected by a parasitic mutant, another psychic named Amahl Farouk / Shadow King, and struggles to force the villain from his mind.

In the second season, Haller returns after a year spent trapped in a mysterious orb. In his absence, his Summerland allies have joined forces with Division 3 to stop Farouk's plan to find his real body and amass world-ending power. Farouk uses Oliver Bird and a device stolen from Division 3 to enable Lenny to be reborn in Amy's body.

In the third season, due to Shadow King's evidence, David flees from Division 3 with Lenny where they set up a place for his cult as David gets a time-traveling mutant named Switch on his side. He plans to improve Switch's powers in order to protect the world. David kidnaps Cary Loudermilk to help him amplify Switch's powers. David then uses Switch to go back to when he was a child and witnesses various parts of his parents' past. This includes his father Charles Xavier going to war and meeting his mother Gabrielle Haller at a mental facility, his father locating and meeting Farouk, and how Farouk got into him in the first place. This brings both sides into conflict with the Time Eaters, extra-dimensional creatures threatening to destroy all of time in response to David's attempts to change it.

== Cast and characters ==
- Dan Stevens as David Haller / Legion:
  The mutant son of Charles Xavier, David was diagnosed with schizophrenia at a young age and meets the "girl of his dreams" in a psychiatric hospital. The character possesses various psychic abilities, including telepathy, telekinesis and teleportation. Stevens joined the series because of showrunner Noah Hawley's involvement, and did extensive research on mental health to prepare for the role, talking to both mentally ill persons and doctors. Hawley and the cast kept secrets from Stevens about the character and plot so that he could identify with David's confusion about himself and reality.
- Rachel Keller as Sydney "Syd" Barrett:
  A young mutant woman who becomes David's girlfriend. Syd's mind trades places with that of anyone she touches, with hers entering their body, and vice versa. Because of her abilities, the character is portrayed as "withdrawn". She is named after Roger "Syd" Barrett of the rock band Pink Floyd, whose music was an important influence on showrunner Noah Hawley.
- Aubrey Plaza as Lenore "Lenny" Busker and Amahl Farouk / Shadow King:
  David's friend, an "impossible optimist" despite a history of drug and alcohol abuse. The character dies in the first episode, but returns as the main form and persona, out of several, adopted by the powerful mutant Amahl Farouk within David's mind. Farouk later gives Busker a new body to use, created by infusing Amy Haller's body with Busker's DNA. Busker was originally written for a middle-aged man, until Hawley met Plaza and rethought the character. However, Plaza insisted that the character's dialogue not be changed for her, instead choosing to play the character as both male and female, preceding their reveal as the Shadow King. This led to Busker "making crass remarks about women and muttering vintage phrases".
- Bill Irwin as Dr. Cary Loudermilk:
  A mutant scientist, one of the founders of Summerland and one of Bird's specialists. The character is introduced in the second episode, but Hawley sought to cast Irwin, for his "playful approach to characters", during filming on the pilot, before the character's role had been written. Hawley "had to pitch him the weird, crazy character dynamic and that the show is about memory and identity", and Irwin agreed to join the project.
- Jeremie Harris as Ptonomy Wallace:
  A former child prodigy and a mutant, one of Bird's specialists. A "memory artist", Ptonomy "remembers everything, and has the ability to take people back into their own memories".
- Amber Midthunder as Kerry Loudermilk:
  A mutant who lives inside Cary's body; their mutant power allows them to coexist in one body or to become separate physical persons. Kerry only ages when she is outside Cary, leaving her physically much younger than he is.
- Katie Aselton as Amy Haller (season 1; recurring season 2):
  David's adoptive older sister, who tries to remain positive despite his history of mental illness. Hawley said that she defined herself as normal "against her brother. She finds herself being looked at as if she might be crazy, as well."
- Jean Smart as Dr. Melanie Bird (seasons 1–2; special guest season 3):
  A demanding psychiatric therapist. Smart joined the series immediately when asked by Hawley, despite knowing nothing about the show and its source material, due to her previous Emmy-nominated work with him on the second season of Fargo.
- Navid Negahban as Amahl Farouk / Shadow King (seasons 2–3): A malevolent presence in David's mind who takes on several different forms. The character, a psychic with similar capabilities to David, was portrayed in a main capacity in the first season by Plaza, while Quinton Boisclair, Devyn Dalton, Kirby Morrow and Jemaine Clement have played his alternate forms.
- Jemaine Clement as Oliver Bird (season 2; recurring season 1; special guest season 3): Melanie's mutant husband. He has spent the last 20 years on the astral plane.
- Hamish Linklater as Clark Debussy / The Interrogator (seasons 2–3; recurring season 1): An "Interrogator" for Division 3.
- Lauren Tsai as Jia-Yi / Switch (season 3): A young mutant with time-traveling abilities.

== Episodes ==
Season	Episodes	Originally released	
Season	Episodes	First released	Last released
1	8	February 8, 2017	March 29, 2017
2	11	April 3, 2018	June 12, 2018
3	8	June 24, 2019	August 12, 2019

=== Season 1 (2017) ===
No. overall	No. in season	Title	Directed by	Written by	Original release date	Prod. code	U.S. viewers (millions)
1	1	"Chapter 1"	Noah Hawley	Noah Hawley	February 8, 2017	XLN01001	1.622
2	2	"Chapter 2"	Michael Uppendahl	Noah Hawley	February 15, 2017	XLN01002	1.133
3	3	"Chapter 3"	Michael Uppendahl	Peter Calloway	February 22, 2017	XLN01003	1.043
4	4	"Chapter 4"	Larysa Kondracki	Nathaniel Halpern	March 1, 2017	XLN01004	0.750
5	5	"Chapter 5"	Tim Mielants	Peter Calloway	March 8, 2017	XLN01005	0.795
6	6	"Chapter 6"	Hiro Murai	Nathaniel Halpern	March 15, 2017	XLN01006	0.732
7	7	"Chapter 7"	Dennie Gordon	Jennifer Yale	March 22, 2017	XLN01007	0.716
8	8	"Chapter 8"	Michael Uppendahl	Noah Hawley	March 29, 2017	XLN01008	0.812

=== Season 2 (2018) ===
No. overall	No. in season	Title	Directed by	Written by	Original release date	Prod. code	U.S. viewers (millions)
9	1	"Chapter 9"	Tim Mielants	Noah Hawley & Nathaniel Halpern	April 3, 2018	XLN02001	0.669
10	2	"Chapter 10"	Ana Lily Amirpour	Noah Hawley & Nathaniel Halpern	April 10, 2018	XLN02002	0.439
11	3	"Chapter 11"	Sarah Adina Smith	Noah Hawley & Nathaniel Halpern	April 17, 2018	XLN02003	0.380
12	4	"Chapter 12"	Ellen Kuras	Noah Hawley & Nathaniel Halpern	April 24, 2018	XLN02004	0.434
13	5	"Chapter 13"	Tim Mielants	Noah Hawley & Nathaniel Halpern	May 1, 2018	XLN02005	0.456
14	6	"Chapter 14"	John Cameron	Noah Hawley	May 8, 2018	XLN02007	0.353
15	7	"Chapter 15"	Charlie McDowell	Noah Hawley & Nathaniel Halpern	May 15, 2018	XLN02006	0.451
16	8	"Chapter 16"	Jeremy Webb	Noah Hawley & Jordan Crair	May 22, 2018	XLN02008	0.409
17	9	"Chapter 17"	Noah Hawley	Noah Hawley & Nathaniel Halpern	May 29, 2018	XLN02011	0.362
18	10	"Chapter 18"	Dana Gonzales	Noah Hawley & Nathaniel Halpern	June 5, 2018	XLN02009	0.467
19	11	"Chapter 19"	Keith Gordon	Noah Hawley	June 12, 2018	XLN02010	0.315

=== Season 3 (2019) ===
No. overall	No. in season	Title	Directed by	Written by	Original release date	Prod. code	U.S. viewers (millions)
20	1	"Chapter 20"	Andrew Stanton	Noah Hawley and Nathaniel Halpern	June 24, 2019	XLN03001	0.377
21	2	"Chapter 21"	Carlos López Estrada	Noah Hawley and Olivia Dufault & Kate Thulin	July 1, 2019	XLN03002	0.381
22	3	"Chapter 22"	John Cameron	Nathaniel Halpern	July 8, 2019	XLN03003	0.370
23	4	"Chapter 23"	Daniel Kwan	Olivia Dufault and Charles Yu	July 15, 2019	XLN03004	0.277
24	5	"Chapter 24"	Arkasha Stevenson	Olivia Dufault and Ben H. Winters	July 22, 2019	XLN03005	0.288
25	6	"Chapter 25"	John Cameron	Noah Hawley	July 29, 2019	XLN03006	0.332
26	7	"Chapter 26"	Dana Gonzales	Noah Hawley and Olivia Dufault	August 5, 2019	XLN03007	0.288
27	8	"Chapter 27"	Noah Hawley and John Cameron	Noah Hawley and Olivia Dufault	August 12, 2019	XLN03008	0.365

== Production ==
=== Development ===
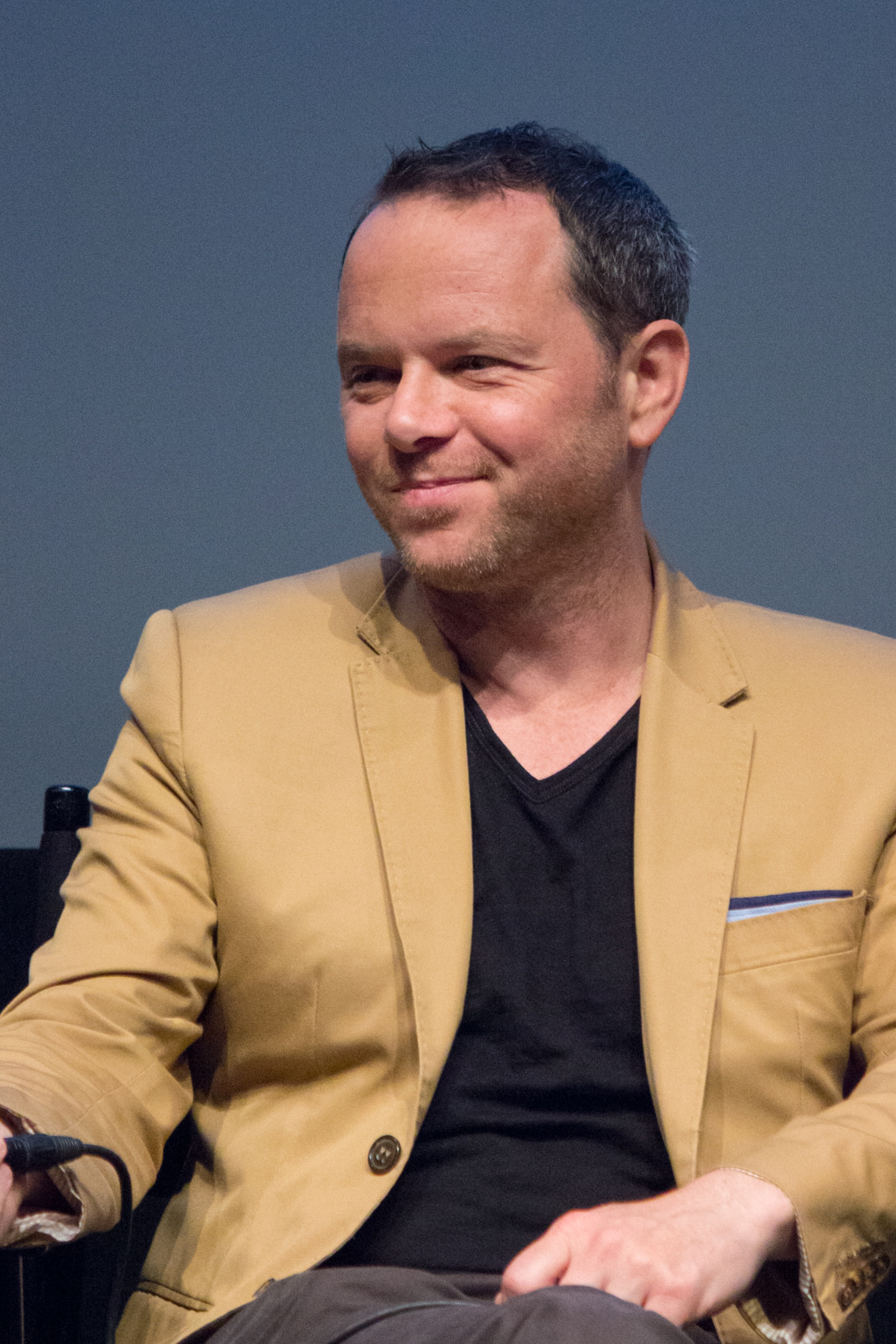
Creator Noah Hawley set out to create a fresh take on the superhero genre.

After completing work on the first season of Fargo at FX in 2014, Noah Hawley was presented with the opportunity to develop the first live-action television series based on the X-Men comics, of which he was a fan when growing up. Hawley was initially pitched two different ideas for the potential series, including an adaptation of the comics' Hellfire Club, but the ideas did not interest him. Instead, he worked with X-Men film series writer and producer Simon Kinberg to reverse-engineer an idea for the series. After discussing an "interesting show in this genre ... that isn't being done", the two settled on the character of David Haller / Legion. Hawley found the character interesting because of his mental illness, and for the potential of the series to depict his unique mindset. He pitched the series as "a deconstruction of a villain ... and a love story".

In October 2015, FX ordered a pilot for Legion, with Marvel Television and FX Productions producing, with the latter handling the physical production. Hawley was set to write the pilot, and executive produce the series alongside X-Men film producers Lauren Shuler Donner, Bryan Singer, and Kinberg, Marvel Television executives Jeph Loeb and Jim Chory, and Hawley's Fargo collaborator John Cameron. Steve Blackman, Alan Fine, Stan Lee, Joe Quesada, and Karim Zreik also executive produce. Hawley's initial script for the series was described as "less fractured", "cohesive [and] much more regular." However, he quickly reconceived the series and decided "more Eternal Sunshine of the Spotless Mind, Terrence Malick, more whimsy, more impressionistic.". By January 2016, FX President John Landgraf was confident that the series would be picked up by the network, saying that "the vast majority of things that we pilot do go forward to series" and "the scripts [for Legion] are extraordinary." That May, FX ordered an eight-episode first season of Legion.

In June, Landgraf said that the series, if successful, could run for as many seasons as Hawley feels it needs to tell the story. Discussing future seasons, Hawley said in January 2017 that he was open to continuing the story past the first season, but didn't want the audience to get to the end of the first run and have "no resolution of any kind at the end of it." Star Dan Stevens said, "I know for a fact that there are more issues that David has to deal with than the one that we really address in the first season." Also at that time, Singer explained the executive producers' roles in the series, saying that he, Donner, and Kinberg brought their experience from making the X-Men films, but their involvement generally consisted of giving small notes on scripts and early cuts of episodes.

In March 2017, FX ordered a second season of the series. With the end of the first season, Hawley said that the second season would consist of ten episodes, and explained that he was unsure at that time how long he would like the series to run: "I think there were things about the first season that [I felt] would unfold faster than they did, and things that I thought would take longer that I dealt with more quickly. I think by the end of the second year I'll have a better sense of how many more years there are to go."

Singer was removed as an executive producer on the series in January 2018, and his name was removed from the credits of the series' episodes beginning with the second season, due to sexual abuse allegations against him being made. Hawley said that it had been Singer who had asked for his name to be removed, and that Singer had only had limited involvement with the series anyway; he had initially expressed interest in directing the pilot of the series, but had not been directly involved since Hawley took over. Also in January 2018, Hawley stated that he was planning for a third season of the series, and soon elaborated that the second season would clearly lead in to the third, and that "it's not a show where each year there's a new villain and the end of the table. It's a three or four or five act story where each season is another chapter in that story." In March 2018, he discussed the proposed acquisition of 21st Century Fox by Disney, saying that he was unsure how it would affect the series and that he had not discussed the issue with either studio, but that he believed "as long as the show is making noise and is watched by people, I won't be worried that they're going to cancel Legion because it doesn't fit in with their larger brand."

In June 2018, FX renewed Legion for a third season. In February 2019, Hawley said that the third season would premiere in June 2019, and would be the final season of the series, which he said had always been his intent. On May 2, 2019, FX said the final season would premiere on June 24, 2019.

=== Writing ===
Kinberg teased in November 2015 that the series would tell "X-Men stories in a slightly different way and even with a slightly different tone" from the films, noting the differences in tone between the "operatic" X-Men films and the "irreverent and hysterical" Deadpool, and feeling that Legion gives "us an opportunity to go even further ... in some ways to sort of blow up the paradigm of comic book or superhero stories and almost do our Breaking Bad of superhero stories." Loeb noted that "the core" of all X-Men comic books has always been that "the X-Men were different ... We live in a world right now where diversity and uniqueness and whether or not we fit in is something that's on our minds twenty-four hours a day." Hawley added, "The great thing about exploring this character is before he has an opinion about anyone else, he has to figure out his own shit. That's what we all have to do. This journey isn't necessarily racing toward a battle with an entity, so much as embracing the battle within."

In May 2016, Hawley described his take on the series as being inspired by the works of David Lynch, and said that "the structure of a story should reflect the content of the story. If the story, as in this case, is about a guy who is either schizophrenic or he has these abilities, i.e., he doesn't know what's real and what's not real, then the audience should have the same experience ... my goal with this is to do something whimsical and imaginative and unexpected. Not just because I want to do something different, but because it feels like the right way to tell this story." Elaborating on structuring the series to reflect Haller's point of view, Hawley said, "I love the idea that even when you're in it on the journey, there is this Alice in Wonderland quality to it, of a story within a story." Discussing the increasing popularity of unreliable narrators in television, Hawley said that he wanted to avoid making the audience think that the series is a puzzle that needs to be solved by solving the mysteries for them upfront—"We're going to take a character out of confusion into clarity and an audience out of mystery into clarity." Hawley deliberately chose not to directly adapt any storylines from the comics, feeling that "you're bound to offend somebody, no matter what you do" in that situation. Instead, he wanted to take the character of Legion and basic set-up around him, and "play" with that, which he described in relation to Fargo—"my job was not to remake the movie, to sort of retell a story that had already been told, but to try to tell a different story with the same effect, the same impact."

Concerning the mental illness aspects of the character, Hawley said, "It's a tragic condition that people have, and so I don't want to use it for entertainment purposes ... if we can ground that [aspect] for the audience, then the idea that he's fallen in love and that he's not ill, there's a hope to that that the audience is gonna grab onto." In January 2017, Hawley explained that he was willing to use different tropes from the superhero genre in the series, such as superhero costumes with capes, if necessary, but did want to avoid "sending a message that all conflict can only be resolved through battle. There is a sense in a lot of these stories that everything always builds to a big fight ... I wanted to find a story that was just as exciting and interesting but doesn't send the message that in the end that 'might makes right'."

At the end of the first season, Hawley said, "I like this idea of having to face our demons", with the first season seeing Haller go through an internal struggle with the malevolent Shadow King occupying his mind, and then the second season seeing that character possess someone else "making it an exterior agent. And there's going to be something very complicated about going to war with himself. It's been with him since he was a baby, it's like a phantom limb now, it's part of him." Hawley said he preferred this idea of a villain "worthy of creating a whole story around", rather than a villain-of-the-year. He was unsure at the time how long that storyline would continue throughout the show, but said "it's a fascinating setup to follow."

=== Casting ===
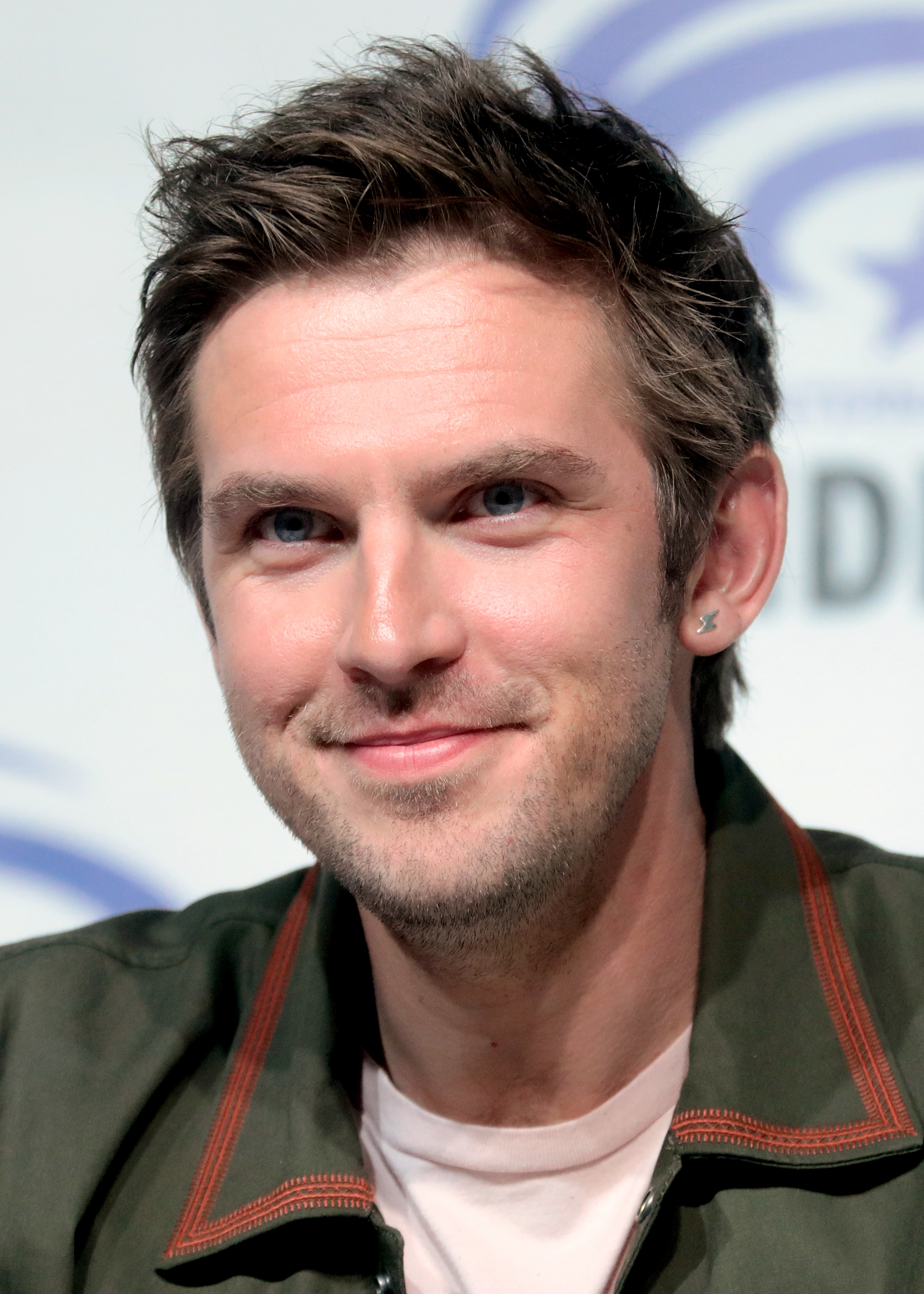
Dan Stevens, who portrays lead character David Haller.

In January 2016, Rachel Keller was cast as the female lead of the series, after her breakout role in Fargo. In early February, Stevens, Aubrey Plaza, and Jean Smart were cast as Haller, his friend Lenny Busker, and therapist Melanie Bird, respectively. Keller's role was revealed to be Syd Barrett. Later that month, Jeremie Harris was cast in the regular role of Ptonomy Wallace, and Amber Midthunder was cast as the savant Kerry Loudermilk. In March, Katie Aselton was cast as Haller's older sister Amy. With the full series order in May 2016, Bill Irwin was added to the cast, in the role of Cary Loudermilk.

Stevens, Keller, Plaza, Irwin, Harris, Midthunder, and Smart returned for the second season, with Aselton making a guest appearance in the season before Amy's body is transformed into a new one for Busker. They are joined by Navid Negahban, cast as the true form of the Shadow King, a character that appeared in several different forms throughout the first season. Jemaine Clement and Hamish Linklater also star in the second season, after having guest roles during the first season as Oliver Bird, the husband of Melanie, and the "Interrogator" Clark Debussy, respectively.

Season 3 added relative newcomer Lauren Tsai as Switch, "a young mutant whose secret ability serves as the key to executing David Haller's plan". She is loosely based on the Marvel Comics character of the same name. In February, it was announced that the characters Gabrielle Haller and Charles Xavier would appear, played by Stephanie Corneliussen and Harry Lloyd, respectively;

=== Design ===
Though he put little thought into the aesthetics of the series when writing the pilot, as a director Hawley wanted the series to be highly stylized, describing his vision for it as "a 1964 Terence Stamp movie". It was not feasible to literally translate Bill Sienkiewicz's iconic artwork of the character to the screen, and Hawley wanted the series to have "its own visual aesthetic to it, and part of that is being a story kind of out of time and out of place". He stated that "the design of a show has to have its own internal logic", and compared this sensibility to the series Hannibal, which he said was "a great example of something that had this almost fetishistic beauty to everything that you saw, whether it was food or violence." Hawley elaborated that the design choice of 60s British films came about because "this whole show is not the world, it's David's experience of the world. He's piecing his world together from nostalgia and memory and the world becomes that."

=== Filming ===
Filming for the pilot took place in Vancouver, with Hawley directing and Dana Gonzales serving as cinematographer. With the series order, the rest of the first season were set to also film in Vancouver, with Craig Wrobleski also working as a cinematographer. Both Gonzales and Wrobleski previously worked with Hawley on Fargo. The pilot featured a large amount of in-camera effects, which Hawley admitted would be a challenge for the series' directors to maintain, given he had 21 days to film the pilot, but the subsequent episodes were only scheduled 8 days of filming each. Some of these shoots ultimately had to be extended to 10 or 11 days filming to meet Hawley's vision. For the second season, the series relocated its production to California to take advantage of tax incentives provided by the California Film Commission under its "Program 2.0" initiative.

=== Music ===
Jeff Russo was revealed to be composing the series' score in October 2016. Hawley stated that when first meeting with Russo about the series, he told the latter that he wanted the series to sound like Pink Floyd's The Dark Side of the Moon, explaining "that album more than anything is really the soundscape of mental illness to some degree". Russo felt that "the important part is allowing the humanity of these characters to really shine through", and in addition to an orchestra he used "a bunch of old synthesizers" and "a lot of interesting sound design" to represent the "otherworldly" elements of the series. With the series' premiere, Russo reiterated that the "through-line" of the series is the relationship between Haller and Barrett, and said that a love story "lends itself to musical moments. It allows it to underscore the character." After his early meetings with Hawley, Russo developed some initial ideas for the score, and created three different themes to represent Haller. He adapted these ideas to fit the episodes once they had been edited. A soundtrack album for the first season was released digitally on February 24, 2017, on Amazon.com.

=== Shared universe connections ===
Landgraf stated in January 2016 that the series would be set in a universe parallel to the X-Men films where "the US government is in the early days of being aware that something called mutants exist but the public is not". He felt it was unlikely that characters would cross over between the show and films, but noted that this could change between then and the premiere of the series. That August, Singer said that Legion had actually been designed to fit into the X-Men universe, but also to stand alone, so "you wouldn't have to label" the relationship between the series and the films. He teased plans to have the series "relate to future X-Men movies".

At New York Comic Con 2016, Donner said that the series is "far from the X-Men movies, but still lives in that universe. The only way for X-Men to keep moving forward is to be original and to surprise. And this is a surprise. It is very, very different." Hawley explained that because the series is depicting the title character's "subjective reality", it would not have to address any connections to the films straight away, noting that Fargo, which is connected to the 1996 film of the same name, at first "had to stand on its own feet" before exploring those connections more; "We have to earn the right to be part of this universe. My hope is we create something so strong that the people in the movie studio call and say they would be foolish enough not to connect these things." He did state that "you can't tell this story without" acknowledging that Legion is the son of Charles Xavier. In regards to the Marvel Cinematic Universe (MCU), Loeb stated that his involvement in the series was a sign that "bridges are being made" between Marvel and Fox, "but I don't want to make any promises ... Marvel heroes at their core are people who are damaged and are trying to figure out who they are in life. It doesn't matter whether or not they're X-Men, Tony Stark, Matt Murdock or Peter Parker ... If you start at a place as strong as David's character is and you have a storyteller like Noah, then it's Marvel. In that way, it is all connected." Set designer Michael Wylie had tried to put Roxxon Corporation and Stark Industries logos as Easter eggs in Legion but was not allowed to since the series existed in a separate universe than Marvel Television's MCU-related series.

Loeb and Donner stated in January 2017 that there were no plans to have Legion be the first in a series of connected shows on FX, like Marvel Television's group of interconnected Defenders series on Netflix, and that Legion and the X-Men television series (later titled The Gifted) being developed for Fox are "not going to get in each other's way." Donner stated that the series was just a chance to bring an X-Men character to the screen who was not going to be used by the films. The producers hoped that audiences would watch the show because of its character-focus and the talents of Hawley and the cast, rather than to "see a Marvel franchise show." Donner also noted that having Hawley focus on Haller's perspective of reality rather than connections to the X-Men films allowed the series to avoid the convoluted continuity of the films, "because we play with so many different timelines, and we rebooted and not really rebooted and all that" throughout the films. Therefore, "the cinematic universe will not worry about Legion. They will not worry about these TV worlds at all. They will just continue in the way that they have been continuing."

In March 2017, Patrick Stewart was approached about reprising his role as Xavier from the film series, saying he was "Absolutely 100%" willing to reprise the role; For the onscreen confirmation that Xavier is Haller's father in "Chapter 7", with Xavier's signature wheelchair shown in a brief flashback, the series' production was able to choose from any of the variant wheelchairs used throughout the film series. They settled on the version from X-Men: Apocalypse (2016), with the prop used in that film being brought out of storage for the show. A young Xavier appears in the third season, portrayed by Harry Lloyd. While having Stewart return as a present-day Xavier had been "seriously considered" by Hawley, he elected the older character's presence to be unnecessary upon deciding to have the season revolve around time travel, casting Lloyd instead after finding James McAvoy to be unavailable for filming.

== Broadcast and release ==
Legion aired on FX in the United States, and on Fox channels in over 125 other countries, releasing using a "day-and-date" delivery system so that viewers around the world get the series on the same day as the U.S.; Fox Networks Group's sales division handles distribution of the series to third parties.

=== Home media ===
The first season was released on Blu-ray and DVD in region 1 on March 27, 2018, in region 2 on October 2, 2017, and in region 4 on November 22, 2017. The second season was released as a manufacture on demand DVD in region 1 on October 30, 2018.

Outside the U.S., all 3 seasons of Legion are available to stream on Disney+ and can be found in the Star or Marvel hubs.

== Reception ==
=== Ratings ===
Writing for Screen Rant, J.M. Brandt noted that FX extensively advertised the series, but was debuting the 90 minute (with commercials) premiere at 10:00 pm on a Wednesday night, later than other genre "monster hits" like Game of Thrones and The Walking Dead. Brandt felt that the series' success would heavily depend on DVR viewing "to bolster what might be a likely smallish live audience". Following the series premiere, Legion's debut ratings were described as "OK, not great", in line with other cable series debuts, but lower than other high-profile FX debuts such as American Crime Story and Hawley's own Fargo.

Legion : U.S. viewers per episode (millions)

Season	Episode number											Average
Season	1	2	3	4	5	6	7	8	9	10	11	Average
1	1.622	1.133	1.043	0.750	0.795	0.732	0.716	0.812	–			0.950
2	0.669	0.439	0.380	0.434	0.456	0.353	0.451	0.409	0.362	0.467	0.315	0.430
3	0.377	0.381	0.370	0.277	0.288	0.332	0.288	0.265	–			0.335

Audience measurement performed by Nielsen Media Research

=== Critical response ===
Critical response of Legion
Season	Rotten Tomatoes	Metacritic
1	90% (239 reviews)	82 (40 reviews)
2	91% (160 reviews)	85 (10 reviews)
3	93% (71 reviews)	72 (6 reviews)

The review aggregation website Rotten Tomatoes reported a 90% approval rating for the first season, with an average rating of 8.45/10 based on 239 reviews. The website's critical consensus reads, "Bold, intelligent, and visually arresting, Legion is a masterfully surreal and brilliantly daring departure from traditional superhero conceits." Metacritic, which uses a weighted average, assigned a score of 82 out of 100 based on 40 reviews for the season, indicating what the website considers to be "universal acclaim".

Ben Travers from IndieWire called the first season "the most intricate, intimate superhero story to date." Travers praised the relatability and uniqueness of the show and how it never lost his interest. He wrote that "David's story is one quickly identifiable to anyone who's questioned themselves, and yet wholly unique to his one-of-a-kind point of view. The combination of character and presentation makes for constantly fascinating television." Travers was especially impressed with the quality of Legion's set pieces and the performances of the main cast. He writes "the sets could be admired independent of the show if they didn't add so much to it, and the entire production raises its artistry to a level atypical of superhero stories (and at least on par with the best design on TV)" and "toss in dynamite performances (Jean Smart, we owe you a rave) matched by sizzling editing most Marvel movies would envy, and boom — 'Legion' is top-tier TV, right off the bat." His final grade of the first season was an A.

A 91% approval rating for the second season was reported by Rotten Tomatoes, with an average rating of 7.75/10 based on 160 reviews, and a critical consensus reading, "Legion returns with a smart, strange second season that settles into a straighter narrative without sacrificing its unique sensibilities." Metacritic assigned a score of 85 out of 100 based on 10 reviews for the season, indicating "universal acclaim".

David Fear from Rolling Stone called Legion "the most mindblowing show on TV right now." He wrote that the show as a whole "keeps pushing the boundaries of the genre - then obliterates them entirely." Fear has heavy praise for season 2's uniqueness, and specifically praises a key scene in the first episode where the titular character Legion and his archnemesis the Shadow King have a dance battle and relates it back to how he enjoys the show as a whole. He writes "Since Legion's sophomore season started airing in April, I have watched this Bob-Fosse-meets-Maori-tribal-dance scene several dozen times. Every time I see it, I think: It makes no sense. It makes complete sense. It is self-indulgent, and utterly insane, and 19 different kinds of perfect. It inspires a total and utter sense of bliss. It's familiar, riddled with pastiche and shout-outs, and totally sui generis. It is, in a way, exactly how I feel about Legion as a whole."

Allison Shoemaker from Consequence has a less positive review of the show. Shoemaker wrote that season 2 "looks great and not much else" and that it "ends on a note that's hollow and hard to accept." Shoemaker also criticizes the character development of some of the side characters, and thought that they were very underdeveloped. She wrote "when you fall in love with a show, you sometimes make excuses for awhile and hope it gets its shit together. 'Well, Lenny is fascinating,' you say, justifying the paper-thin characterizations (and not just of women; Ptonomy, Oliver, and Clark are also all underdeveloped.)." Shoemaker's overall verdict of the season was that "There's so much mess and emptiness. Looks great. Less filling." She gave the finale a D+ grade and the overall season a C+.

Rotten Tomatoes reported a 93% approval rating for the third season, with an average rating of 7.9/10 based on 71 reviews. and a critical consensus reading, "In its final season, Legion remains a singular piece of visually arresting, mind-bending television that never fails to surprise." Metacritic, which uses a weighted average, assigned a score of 72 out of 100 based on 6 critics, indicating "generally favorable reviews".

Tim Goodman from The Hollywood Reporter called the third season "weirdly told and wonderfully acted" but also cautioned viewers to not "get hung up on the plot." He gives this warning because he believes that viewers tend to get disappointed when TV shows do not line up with their exact expectations for the plot and writes that "if you were expecting something predictable or literal, well, you weren't paying attention from the very first frame." Goodman reviewed the first four episodes of the third season and wrote that he was "loving the direction the third and final season of Legion is going in because it has been less about Marvel and more about Hawley and, given the television track record of each, I'll take the latter every time." His main thoughts on the first half of season 3 are that "Hawley is once again having a blast reimagining a Marvel superhero show and that "he is tripling down on the visual gymnastics and mind-altering aspects."

In a less favorable review with a similar critique to Shoemaker's review of season 2, David Sims from The Atlantic called the third season "visually dazzling, but little else." He writes that "The set design is striking, and Hawley's direction even more so: The pilot is rife with elaborately choreographed shots in which not a detail is out of place. It's truly cinematic stuff that deserves to be taken in on the biggest screen possible." However, he critiques the show for not being able to stick to one main message and having messily delivered themes, which makes the overall story weaker. He wrote that the show "isn't sure if it wants to be a show about David's abilities, or about mental illness" and that "it tries so hard to dazzle that it forgets to tell a meaningful story."

=== Themes and analysis ===
Discussing the series' exploration of mental illness, Charles Pulliam-Moore of io9 stated that schizophrenia is widely featured in popular culture and is generally misrepresented and noted that giving Haller schizophrenia was a change from the comics where the character had dissociative identity disorder. He felt that the series takes advantage of this change both to show "mind-bending, trippy moments meant to convey to viewers how fractured and disorienting David's perceptions of reality can be" and by having characters like Melanie Bird insist that Haller can improve with treatment and counselling. Pulliam-Moore explained that other telepaths with mental illnesses in the X-Men franchise—Jason Stryker in X2, Jean Grey in X-Men: The Last Stand, and Charles Xavier in Logan—were all treated with drugs, and praised the alternative therapy explored in the series, as well as the fact that the removal of the Shadow King from Haller's mind was not an excuse to ignore the mental illness issues moving forward. He concluded, "It's that idea—that healing is an ongoing, complex, and dynamic process—that made Legion's first season so strong", and hoped that it would be continued in the second season of the series.

Tony Stallings from Hollywood Insider also discussed Legion's take on mental illness and mental health problems. He wrote that the show "is the first of its kind, as no other series in its genre has addressed the issue of mental health within the makeup of a superhero show quite like it has before or since." He thought that the show's choice to connect "David's power with his mental instability raises the stakes" and that "it makes David as much of a danger to his friends as he is to his enemies despite noble intentions." Stallings thought that Hawley provided an accurate and closer look at mental illness with the show's writing and that "he demonstrates how severely it can impact people's lives by weaponizing David's disorder into potentially lethal powers and shows how important it is for David to get the treatment he needs to keep everyone around him safe." In his opinion, the show's best take on mental health is that it shows that "treatment itself is more than just medicine or pills. The most important treatment is support."

=== Accolades ===
Year	Award	Category	Recipient	Result	Ref.
2017	TVLine's Performer of the Week	Performance in "Chapter 6"	Aubrey Plaza	Won	
2017	Golden Trailer Awards	Best Sound Editing (TV Spot/Trailer/Teaser for a series)	Legion	Won	
2017	Saturn Awards	Best Superhero Adaptation Television Series	Legion	Nominated	
2017	Camerimage International Film Festival	First Look – TV Pilots Competition	Dana Gonzales for "Chapter 1"	Nominated	
2017	IGN's Best of 2017 Awards	TV series of the year	Legion	Nominated	
2017	IGN's Best of 2017 Awards	Best New Series	Legion	People's Choice	
2017	IGN's Best of 2017 Awards	Best Action Series	Legion	Runner-Up (tied)	
2017	IGN's Best of 2017 Awards	Best Dramatic TV Performance	Dan Stevens	Nominated	
2018	TVLine's Performer of the Week	Performance in "Chapter 19"	Dan Stevens	Won	
2018	Satellite Awards	Best Television Series – Genre	Legion	Nominated	
2018	ASC Awards	Outstanding Achievement in Cinematography in Regular Series for Commercial Television	Dana Gonzales for "Chapter 1"	Nominated	
2018	Visual Effects Society Awards	Outstanding Visual Effects in a Photoreal Episode	John Ross, Eddie Bonin, Sebastian Bergeron, Lionel Lim, Paul Benjamin for "Chapter 1"	Nominated	
2018	Empire Awards	Best TV Actor	Dan Stevens	Nominated	
2018	GLAAD Media Awards	Outstanding Individual Episode (in a series without a regular LGBTQ character)	"Chapter 8"	Nominated	
2018	Peabody Awards	Entertainment	Legion	Nominated	
2018	MTV Movie & TV Awards	Best Villain	Aubrey Plaza	Nominated	
2019	ASC Awards	Outstanding Achievement in Cinematography in Regular Series for Commercial Television	Dana Gonzales for "Chapter 20"	Nominated	
2019	ASC Awards	Outstanding Achievement in Cinematography in Regular Series for Commercial Television	Polly Morgan for "Chapter 23"	Nominated	
2020	Harvey Awards	Best Adaptation from Comic Book/Graphic Novel	Legion: Season 3	Nominated	
