= Chapter 25 (Legion) =

- Legion episode
- Episode no.: Season 3 Episode 6
- Directed by: John Cameron
- Written by: Noah Hawley
- Cinematography by: Alex Disenhof
- Editing by: Regis Kimble; Robin August
- Production code: XLN03006
- Original air date: July 29, 2019
- Running time: 51 minutes

Guest appearances
- Jean Smart as Melanie Bird (special guest star); Jemaine Clement as Oliver Bird (special guest star); Jason Mantzoukas as Jerome / The Wolf; Pearl Amanda Dickson as Teen Syd; Samantha Cormier as Cynthia; West Mulholland as Blue; Sophie Nack as Sweetie

Episode chronology
← Previous "Chapter 24"	Next → "Chapter 26"
- Legion season 3

"Chapter 25" is the sixth episode of the third season of the American surrealist superhero thriller television series Legion, based on the Marvel Comics character of the same name. It was written by series creator Noah Hawley and directed by executive producer John Cameron. It originally aired on FX on July 29, 2019.

The series follows David Haller, a "mutant" diagnosed with schizophrenia at a young age, as he tries to control his psychic powers and combat the sinister forces trying to control him. Eventually, he betrays his former friends at the government agency Division 3, who label him a threat and set off to hunt him down. In the episode, Syd's mind has manifested as a baby in the astral plane, where she is adopted by Oliver and Melanie Bird, and raised through her second childhood.

According to Nielsen Media Research, the episode was seen by an estimated 0.332 million household viewers and gained a 0.1 ratings share among adults aged 18–49. The episode received generally positive reviews from critics, who praised the character development and the rap battle sequence, although some expressed criticism for the pacing and lack of progress with the previous episodes.

== Plot ==
In the astral plane, Oliver and Melanie live in a hut. One day, Oliver finds a baby in the fields and they both decide to adopt her, naming her Sydney. They are also often disturbed by a man named Jerome, also known as "The Wolf," a person whose presence seem to annoy everyone, who also found a woman named Cynthia. Oliver and Melanie decide to adopt Cynthia to help her lost "innocence".

As time passes, the baby grows into a child, with both her and Cynthia constantly being tempted by The Wolf. Cynthia succumbs to his tricks and walks away with him. The child is constantly haunted by nightmares, result of the real world's influence. To avoid the Wolf, they move into the city, although Cynthia has fallen for the Wolf. The child now becomes the teenage version of Syd, who is struggling to find her place in the world. She runs into Cynthia, who tries to get her to join the Wolf. Syd refuses and tells Oliver and Melanie that she wants to save Cynthia.

Syd and Oliver go to the Wolf's lair, where they take Cynthia to their house. However, The Wolf has followed them, prompting Oliver and the Wolf to engage in a rap battle. Oliver wins the rap battle, although Cynthia still willingly goes with the Wolf, much to Syd's disappointment. Oliver and Melanie tell Syd that they prepared her for this life, encouraging her to return to the real world, just as she grows into her adult self.

Syd awakens in the airship, finding that Switch's doorway is malfunctioning, although she is unable to enter. She meets with Cary and Kerry, telling them she can stop David and Switch. Cary creates bracelets for each other, which will allow them to enter the doorway. Before entering, Kerry asks Cary to transfer her wounds to him so she can fight, which he does at great cost. As the time demons appear, Syd, Cary and Kerry enter the doorway, which finally closes.

== Production ==
=== Development ===
In July 2019, it was reported that the sixth episode of the season would be titled "Chapter 25", and was to be directed by executive producer John Cameron and written by series creator Noah Hawley. This was Hawley's seventeenth writing credit, and Cameron's third directing credit.

=== Filming ===
The episode featured a rap battle sequence, where Oliver and The Wolf performed at a night club dream sequence. The idea wasn't originally planned by Hawley while writing the script, although he commented that "I would be depriving his [Jemaine] fans and my audience of a golden opportunity if I didn't take this seriously." Hawley wrote the rap lyrics as a placeholder, assuming that they would later change them, but Clement liked it enough, "But he did it, happily, and had no real complaints. I said if you want to re-write this at all, feel free. He changed very little, we filmed it, and it's one of my favorite things ever."

== Reception ==
=== Viewers ===
In its original American broadcast, "Chapter 25" was seen by an estimated 0.332 million household viewers and gained a 0.1 ratings share among adults aged 18–49, according to Nielsen Media Research. This means that 0.1 percent of all households with televisions watched the episode. This was a 15% increase in viewership from the previous episode, which was watched by 0.288 million viewers with a 0.1 in the 18-49 demographics.

=== Critical reviews ===
"Chapter 25" received generally positive reviews from critics. The review aggregator website Rotten Tomatoes reported an 80% approval rating with an average rating of 7.8/10 for the episode, based on 5 reviews.

Alex McLevy of The A.V. Club gave the episode a "B+" grade and wrote, "The rap battle between Oliver and Jerome is maybe the single silliest thing Legion has ever done. Sillier than a lip-synching mouse, sillier than any droll witticism or stomping on a previously enormous delusion creature or any of it. On an episode already experimenting with a far lighter and more playful tone than just about every episode that's preceded it, it pushed the series into a downright goofy realm. But circumstances aside, if you can't enjoy a ridiculous rap battle between Jemaine Clement and Jason Mantzoukas, I'm not sure I want to know you."

Nick Harley of Den of Geek gave the episode a 2.5 star rating out of 5 wrote, "'Chapter 25' is going to make a certain type of Legion fan very happy, just not this one. One person's delightful experiment is another's fanciful slog. To each their own. I thought 'Chapter 24' turned the action and urgency of the season up to 11, and this episode halted that momentum dead in its tracks with a self-satisfied detour filled with metaphor and little else. At least like the foot looks to be back on the pedal next week." Kevin Lever of Tell Tale TV gave the episode a 4 star rating out of 5 and wrote, "'Chapter 25 provides Syd the answer she's been seeking this whole time. It does so with a fantastic hour of self-discovery told with returning characters long missed."
