= Miranda Grosvenor =

Pseudonymous American telephone socialite

Miranda Grosvenor was the fictitious name of a Louisiana woman who supposedly seduced dozens of famous men over the telephone during the 1970s and 1980s. In 1999, Vanity Fair exposed the mystery woman as Whitney Walton (1941-2016), a Baton Rouge social worker and fan who made a full-time hobby of calling stars. Her voice and conversation style were reportedly so alluring that wealthy and powerful men (including actors, musicians, and movie moguls) fell in love without ever meeting her, and rearranged their whole evenings around speaking to the mysterious stranger.

== Background ==
As "Miranda," Walton engaged in late-night telephone conversations with such stars as Billy Joel, Warren Beatty, Bob Dylan, Buck Henry, Eric Clapton, Michael Apted, Bono, Mike Nichols, Vitas Gerulaitis, Ted Kennedy, Johnny Carson, Art Garfunkel, Peter Gabriel, Robert De Niro, Rush Limbaugh, and Richard Gere, telling them that she was a blonde Tulane University student, wealthy socialite, and international model. According to Vanity Fair, at least two of her telephone paramours, Quincy Jones and Richard Perry, proposed marriage. Billy Joel wrote songs which he sang on Miranda's answering machine, considered her at times his "only friend," and considered writing a musical about her. Many others bought her jewelry and sent her plane tickets. Novelist Kinky Friedman created a character based on Grosvenor, Stephanie DuPont, in his detective novels.

According to John McCall, the multimillionaire shampoo magnate and novelist,

Whitney Walton was friends with almost everybody. From maitre d's at fancy restaurants to movie stars, writers, pop singers, football players, team owners, she seemed to know everything. If you had a question on where to go or what to eat if you were in a strange city, she knew where to go, and she seemed to know all the people involved and they all knew her. She was a smart, sophisticated lady who knew a lot about everything.

Miranda's telephone calls dissipated at some point in the mid-1980s. Though no one knows why "Miranda" retired, it was rumored that she "disappeared" in the wake of threats from lawyers of tennis player Vitas Gerulaitis.

== Movie and book deals ==
In 2000, HarperCollins paid close to $1 million for Walton's memoir, Miranda Rites: My Life As the Mysterious Hollywood Sweet Talker (aka The Miranda Mystique: How I Captivated the World's Most Desired Men), scheduled to be published in December 2006, as well as her audiobook rendition. The deal was struck after agent Dean Williamson hired a private detective to track her down, whereupon he finally persuaded her to tell her story. In January 2001, Robert De Niro, one of Miranda's former talkmates, purchased the film rights to the story.

In late 2007, online book retailers advertised a January 2008 publication date, and had identified the planned book as having ISBN 978-0060185213 with 256 pages. An audio version was also at one point available for pre-sale on Amazon.com. In January 2008, HarperCollins reported that the memoir had been cancelled, without giving a reason.

Grosvenor's creator, Whitney Walton, died of natural causes on February 24, 2016 in Baton Rouge, at the age of 74.

== Sources ==
- Vanity Fair, "The Miranda Obsession", by Bryan Burrough, December 1999
- Offman, Craig (April 19, 2000). "Sweet-talker to the stars signs book, film deals: The voice that charmed Hollywood's men goes public". Salon. Archived from the original on February 28, 2007.
- The Real Stephanie Dupont, by Sidney Moody, Austin Chronicle, November 2, 2001
- The Scotsman "Mystery Woman Who Had the Stars Hanging on the Telephone", by Julian Brouwer, November 12, 1999
