= Arkasha Stevenson =

American filmmaker

- Education: The University of North Carolina at Chapel Hill
- Occupation: Filmmaker

Arkasha Stevenson is an American filmmaker and former journalist. She has directed episodes of Legion and Briarpatch, as well as the third season of Channel Zero. She made her feature directorial debut with the 2024 horror film The First Omen, prequel of The Omen.

== Career ==
Prior to working in entertainment, Stevenson worked as a photojournalist for the Los Angeles Times.

In 2015, Stevenson won the Iris Prize for her thesis film Vessels, which is about black market breast enhancements in the transgender community. She and her writing partner Tim Smith first worked together on Pineapple, a short film which debuted at the 2017 Sundance Film Festival.

In 2018, Stevenson directed the third season of the Syfy horror series Channel Zero. In 2021, she directed the first episode of the Netflix horror series Brand New Cherry Flavor, which Smith co-produced.

In May 2022, Stevenson was announced as the director of the 2024 horror film The First Omen, a prequel to The Omen (1976). She and Smith also did the rewrite. Her next film is an untitled horror film set during a bachelor party that goes awry. She co-wrote the script with Smith. The project is produced by A24. Filming wrapped in April 2026.

== Filmography ==
Short film

Year	Title	Director	Writer
2015	Vessels	Yes	Yes
2017	Pineapple	Yes	Yes

Feature film

Year	Title	Director	Writer
2024	The First Omen	Yes	Yes
TBA	Untitled horror film	Yes	Yes

Television

Year	Title	Notes
2018	Channel Zero	Season 3
2019	Legion	Episode: "Chapter 24"
2020	Briarpatch	Episode: "Game Theory and Mescaline"
2021	Brand New Cherry Flavor	Episode: "I Exist" Also co-executive producer
