= Harry Lloyd =

English actor

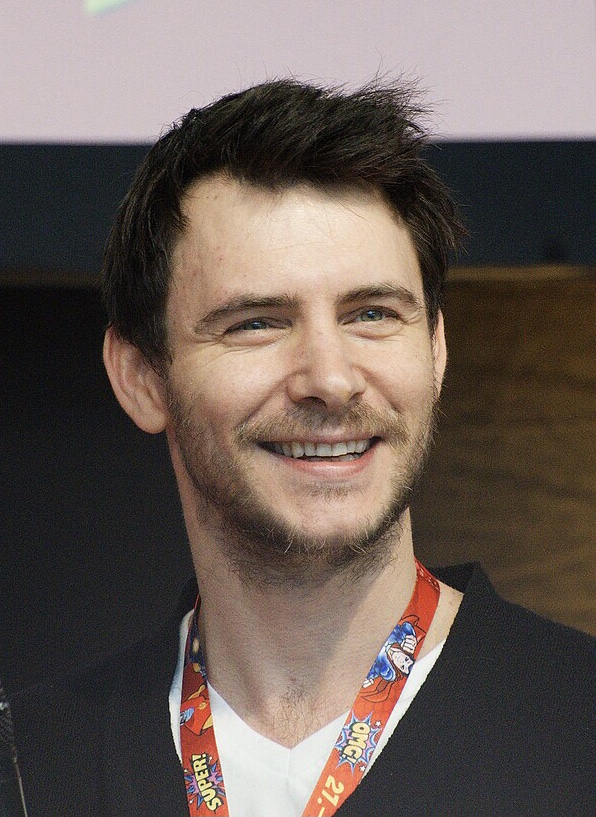
- Lloyd at the 2023 Comic-Con Germany in Stuttgart
- Born: Harry Charles Salusbury Lloyd; November 17, 1983 (age 42); London, England
- Occupation: Actor
- Years active: 1999–present
- Relatives: Charles Dickens (great-great-great-grandfather); Peter Gerald Charles Dickens (maternal grandfather); Henry Blagrove (great-grandfather)
- Family: Dickens

Harry Charles Salusbury Lloyd is an English actor. His performance in the Channel 4 miniseries The Fear (2012) earned him a British Academy Television Award nomination. He gained prominence through his roles as Will Scarlet in the BBC drama Robin Hood (2006), Jeremy Baines in the Doctor Who episodes "Human Nature" and "The Family of Blood" (2007), and Viserys Targaryen in the first season of the HBO series Game of Thrones (2011).

Lloyd played Paul Crosley in the WGN series Manhattan (2014), Peter Quayle in the Starz series Counterpart (2017–2019), Charles Xavier in the third season of the FX series Legion (2019), Bernard Marx in the Peacock series Brave New World (2020) and Damien Cantor in the sixth season of the Apple TV spy series Slow Horses (2026). He voiced Viktor in the Netflix animated series Arcane (2021–2024), Z in Xenoblade Chronicles 3 (2022), and Ultima in Final Fantasy XVI (2023). He also appeared in Wolf Hall (2015) on BBC Two, and series 1 of Marcella (2016) on ITV.

Lloyd is also known for his theatre work, being nominated for the 2015 Offie for "Best Male Performance" (Notes from Underground). His films include The Theory of Everything (2014), Anthropoid (2016), and The Wife (2017).

== Early life and education ==
Harry Charles Salusbury Lloyd was born in London, the son of Marion Evelyn (née Dickens), a children's publisher, and Jonathan Lloyd, who heads a literary agency. He is the great-great-great-grandson of Victorian writer Charles Dickens through his mother, who is the daughter of Peter Gerald Charles Dickens, and the great-granddaughter of barrister Henry Fielding Dickens. One of his maternal great-grandfathers was Rear-Admiral Henry Blagrove, and another maternal ancestor was composer and pianist Ignaz Moscheles.

Lloyd was educated at Eton College and, while there, made his television debut at the age of 16 as James Steerforth in the BBC's 1999 adaptation of David Copperfield opposite Daniel Radcliffe. In 2002, he was cast as young Rivers in Goodbye Mr Chips. He went on to study English at Christ Church, Oxford, where he joined the Oxford University Dramatic Society and appeared in several plays.

== Career ==
From 2006 to 2007, Lloyd played Will Scarlet in series 1 and 2 of the BBC's Robin Hood. In 2007, he made his professional stage debut at the Trafalgar Studios in A Gaggle of Saints, one of three short plays that make up Neil LaBute's Bash, for which he received positive reviews. He played Jeremy Baines, a student whose mind is taken over by a species of aliens called the Family of Blood, in the Doctor Who episodes "Human Nature" and "The Family of Blood". He was suggested as a possible candidate to play the Doctor when David Tennant left the role.

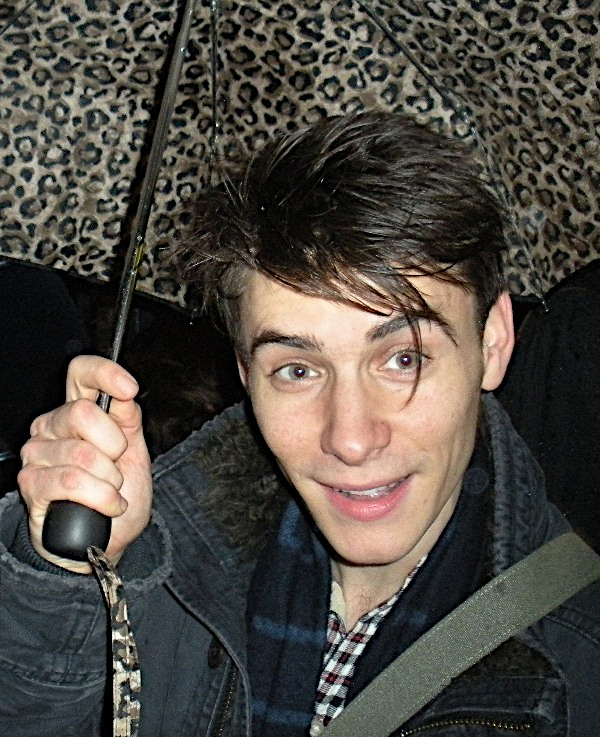
Lloyd in 2010.

In 2011, Lloyd appeared as Viserys Targaryen in the HBO series Game of Thrones. He also appeared in the BBC comedy Taking The Flak, and as Herbert Pocket in Great Expectations. He had small roles in Jane Eyre and The Iron Lady, and starred as the son of a gangster in The Fear, which aired on Channel 4 in December 2012. In 2012, he appeared as Sir Edmund Mortimer in the BBC television film The Hollow Crown: Henry IV, Part 1, and he played Ferdinand, The Duke of Calabria, in The Duchess of Malfi at the Old Vic in London. He took on his first leading role in the feature film Closer to the Moon, released in 2014. Lloyd also appeared as Stephen Hawking's fictionalised roommate Brian in the Best Picture-nominated film The Theory of Everything, alongside Academy Award winner Eddie Redmayne and Academy Award nominee Felicity Jones.

In 2015, Lloyd co-created the web series Supreme Tweeter, in which he stars as a fictionalised version of himself. The following year he played Adolf Opálka in the epic war film Anthropoid, also starring Jamie Dornan and Cillian Murphy. He also appeared in the ITV series Marcella. He returned to the stage for the production Good Canary at the Rose Theatre, which was directed by John Malkovich in the role of the protagonist. In 2017, he filmed for the role of Peter Quayle in the science fiction thriller series Counterpart with J. K. Simmons, and starred as young Joe Castleman in the film The Wife, an adaptation of the book by Meg Wolitzer, opposite Glenn Close and Jonathan Pryce (the latter playing the older Joe). In 2019, Lloyd was cast as a young Charles Xavier in the third season of the FX series Legion, replacing Patrick Stewart and James McAvoy, both of whom had previously portrayed the character in the X-Men film series, the former having been approached about reprising the role in the series before the creative direction of the series changed. Later that same year, it was announced that Lloyd would be cast in the series regular role as Bernard Marx in Brave New World. In 2021, Lloyd voiced Viktor in the Netflix animated action-adventure series Arcane. In 2022, Lloyd voiced Brian McNally in the Audible original podcast series, The Miranda Obsession and Z in the video game Xenoblade Chronicles 3.

== Personal life ==
Lloyd is a keen football fan and an avid supporter of Chelsea F.C.

== Filmography ==
=== Film ===
Year	Title	Role	Director
2011	Jane Eyre	Richard Mason	Cary Joji Fukunaga
2011	The Iron Lady	Young Denis Thatcher	Phyllida Lloyd
2013	Closer to the Moon	Virgil	Nae Caranfil
2014	Big Significant Things	Craig Harrison	Bryan Reisberg
2014	The Riot Club	Lord Ryot	Lone Scherfig
2014	The Theory of Everything	Brian	James Marsh
2015	Narcopolis	Ben Grieves	Justin Trefgarne
2016	Anthropoid	Adolf Opálka	Sean Ellis
2017	The Wife	Young Joe Castleman	Björn Runge
2019	The Show	Geoffrey	James Alexandrou
2019	As I Am	Mr. Jackson	Guy Davies
2022	The Lost King	King Richard III	Stephen Frears
2028	The Beatles – A Four-Film Cinematic Event †	George Martin	Sam Mendes

=== Shorts ===
Year	Title	Role	Director
2009	Oscar & Jim	Gerry	Iain Weatherby & Paul Fenwick
2011	The Half-Light	Second Man	Prasanna Puwanarajah
2013	Desire	Chris	Leon Ockenden

=== Television ===
Year	Title	Role	Notes
1999	David Copperfield	Young James Steerforth	Television film
2002	Goodbye, Mr. Chips	Young Rivers	Television film
2005	Murder Investigation Team	Matt Pattinson	Episode: "Phone Tag"
2005	The Bill	Matt Richie	Episode: "A Social Decision"
2006	Holby City	Damon Hughes	Episode: "Flight of the Bumblebee"
2006	Vital Signs	Jason Bradley	5 episodes
2006	Genie in the House	Nev	Episode: "Puppy Love"
2006–2007	Robin Hood	Will Scarlett	Main role; 26 episodes
2007	Doctor Who	Jeremy Baines	2 episodes
2008	Heroes and Villains	Lucas	Episode: "Richard the Lionheart"
2008	The Devil's Whore	Prince Rupert of the Rhine	Episode #1
2009	Lewis	Peter	Episode: "Counter Culture Blues"
2009	Taking the Flak	Alexander Taylor-Pierce	Main role; 5 episodes
2011	Game of Thrones	Viserys Targaryen	Main role; 5 episodes
2011	Great Expectations	Herbert Pocket	Miniseries; 2 episodes
2012	The Hollow Crown: Henry IV, Part 1	Sir Edmund Mortimer	Television film
2012	The Fear	Matty Beckett	Miniseries; 4 episodes
2014	Manhattan	Paul Crosley	Main role; 23 episodes
2015	Wolf Hall	Henry Percy, 6th Earl of Northumberland	Miniseries; 3 episodes
2016	Marcella	Henry Gibson	8 episodes
2017–2019	Counterpart	Peter Quayle	Main role; 18 episodes
2018	Hang Ups	Nathan Slater	4 episodes
2019	Legion	Charles Xavier	3 episodes
2020	Brave New World	Bernard Marx	Main role
2021–2024	Arcane	Viktor	Voice
2024	Star Wars: The Bad Batch	Captain Mann	Episode: "A Different Approach"
2024	Halo	The Monitor	Episode: "Halo"
2025	Prime Target	Andrew Carter	5 episodes
2025	I, Jack Wright	DCI Hector Morgan	6 episodes
2025	The Iris Affair	Hugo Pym	4 episodes
2026	Marble Hall Murders	Roland Crace / Robert Waysmith	6 episodes
2026	Slow Horses	Damien Cantor	Series 6

=== Stage ===
Year	Title	Role	Notes
2003	Kiss of the Spider Woman	Valentin Arregui Paz	Oxford University Dramatic Society
2005	The Comedy of Errors	Antipholus of Syracuse	Oxford University Dramatic Society
2008	The Sea	Willy Carson	Theatre Royal Haymarket
2009	A View from the Bridge	Rodolpho	Duke of York's Theatre
2010	The Little Dog Laughed	Alex	Garrick Theatre
2012	The Duchess of Malfi	Duke Ferdinand	The Old Vic
2014	Notes From Underground	Underground Man	Various in Paris; Print Room Coronet in London
2016	Good Canary	Jack	Rose Theatre
2020	The Dumb Waiter	Gus	Hampstead Theatre
2022	The Narcissist	Jim	Chichester Festival Theatre

=== Video games ===
Year	Title	Role	Notes
2022	Xenoblade Chronicles 3	Z	Voice
2023	Xenoblade Chronicles 3: Future Redeemed	Z	Voice
2023	Final Fantasy XVI	Ultima	Voice

=== Podcast ===
Year	Title	Role	Notes
2022	The Miranda Obsession	Brian McNally	Audible podcast

=== Audiobooks ===
In 2015, Harry Lloyd narrated A Knight of the Seven Kingdoms.. This was followed up with Lloyd providing the narration to The Rise of the Dragon – An Illustrated History of the Targaryen Dynasty, which was released in 2022.

== Awards and nominations ==
Year	Award	Category	Work	Result	Ref.
2011	Scream Awards	Best Ensemble	Game of Thrones	Nominated	
2013	British Academy Television Awards	Best Supporting Actor	The Fear	Nominated	
2014	Guam International Film Festival	Achievement in Acting	Big Significant Things	Nominated	
2015	Offie	Best Male Performance	Notes from Underground	Nominated	
2015	Gopo Awards	Best Actor in a Leading Role	Closer to the Moon	Nominated	
2019	International Film Festival of Wales	Judges Award	Philophobia	Nominated	

== See also ==
- Dickens family
