= Charles Xavier (film character) =

Character in Marvel film franchises

- X-Men film series and Marvel Cinematic Universe character
- Patrick Stewart as Charles Xavier in X-Men (2000)
- First appearance: X-Men (2000)
- Last appearance: Avengers: Doomsday (2026)
- Based on: Professor X by Stan Lee and Jack Kirby
- Adapted by: Bryan Singer; Tom DeSanto
- Portrayed by: Patrick Stewart (2000–2017; 2022–2026); James McAvoy (2011–2019); Laurence Belcher (2011); Harry Lloyd (2019)

In-universe information
- Full name: Charles Francis Xavier
- Nickname: Professor X
- Species: Human mutant
- Title: Headmaster
- Occupation: Researcher; Teacher
- Affiliation: X-Men
- Family: Mystique (adopted sister); Cassandra Nova (twin sister, alternate timeline); P. Xavier (twin brother)
- Significant other: Moira MacTaggert
- Nationality: British-American
- Powers and abilities: Genius intellect; Powerful psychic abilities; Telepathy

Professor Charles Francis Xavier, also known simply by his codename Professor X, is a character primarily portrayed by Patrick Stewart, James McAvoy, and Harry Lloyd in 20th Century Fox's X-Men franchise and the Marvel Cinematic Universe (MCU) franchise produced by Marvel Studios, based on the Marvel Comics character of the same name created by Stan Lee and Jack Kirby.

In the film series' continuity, Xavier is a telepathic mutant and activist who founded the Xavier School for Gifted Youngsters, intended to house displaced or discriminated mutants while acting as an educational and training ground for cultivating their powers. With the assistance of several of his school's alumni, he eventually forms and leads a mutant strike force known as the X-Men, dedicated to carrying out his initiative for a peaceful co-existence between mutants and humanity, the latter of whom express significant xenophobia towards them. He is often depicted as kind, empathetic and wise in his ability to relate to his mutant brethren, and believes in a future where his race is fully welcomed into society at large. He is contrasted by his former friend Erik Lehnsherr, who works to establish mutants as dominant over humans, due to his jaded views on their co-existence being amplified by his experiences as both a mutant and Holocaust survivor during World War II. As such, Xavier's X-Men often oppose Lehnsherr's Brotherhood of Mutants in working towards their respective goals. In a distant possible future, Xavier would end up accidentally killing a large number of mutants, including several X-Men, due to a telepathically-induced seizure, inadvertently putting his own race at risk of extinction, and leaving him to be cared for by a world-weary James "Logan" Howlett. Xavier assists him in escorting a young mutant named Laura across the Canadian border as they are being pursued by the Reavers, led by Donald Pierce and Zander Rice. While settling down on their objective, Xavier is unceremoniously murdered by X-24, a genetically enhanced clone of Logan created by the Alkali Corporation and Transigen Project following Laura's escape.

Xavier has been a central figure of the film series, appearing in eleven live-action feature films and one television series. Patrick Stewart plays him in the films X-Men, X2, X-Men: The Last Stand, X-Men Origins: Wolverine, The Wolverine, and Logan, while James McAvoy stars as a younger Xavier in X-Men: First Class, X-Men: Apocalypse, Deadpool 2 and Dark Phoenix. The two actors both play him at different points in time in X-Men: Days of Future Past. Laurence Belcher portrays Xavier as a child in First Class, and Harry Lloyd portrays him in the television series Legion. Stewart returned to play alternate versions of Xavier in the Marvel Cinematic Universe (MCU) films Doctor Strange in the Multiverse of Madness (2022) and Avengers: Doomsday (2026). Additionally, Stewart has voiced Xavier in the video games X2: Wolverine's Revenge and X-Men: The Official Game, the latter of which ties directly into the film series.

Although Xavier is American-born in the comics and in animation, he speaks with an English accent in the films. First Class establishes that he lived in the United States during childhood, though his mother speaks with an English accent, indicating he may have developed his accent because of her. Stewart's and McAvoy's performances as Xavier have received a universally positive critical reception, winning a Saturn Award. Stewart held the Guinness World Record for "longest career as a live-action Marvel character" from 2017 until 2021 alongside co-star Hugh Jackman, and outright from 2022 until 2024. A new incarnation of Professor X is set to be introduced for the MCU beginning with the untitled X-Men film (2028), with Christopher Abbott succeeding Stewart and McAvoy in the role.

== Concept, creation, and characterization ==
=== Development ===
The comic book character, Professor X, was first created by writer Stan Lee and artist/co-writer Jack Kirby. Professor X first appeared in X-Men #1 (September 1963). Stan Lee had stated that the physical inspiration for Professor Xavier was from Academy Award-winning actor Yul Brynner. While some people have noticed correlations between Professor Xavier and Martin Luther King Jr., as well as correlations between his longtime antagonist and friend, Erik Lehnsherr and Malcolm X, Stan Lee himself did not, in fact, base either character on these real life individuals, nor did he base the creation of the X-Men on the Civil Rights Movement. In numerous interviews, when discussing the origins of the X-Men, Stan Lee stated he simply thought it would be an interesting idea if a group of people called "mutants" were born with special powers instead of gaining them via an accident involving radiation, and that it would be doubly interesting if, in addition to fighting other "mutants," they had to deal with the public at large not liking them as well. As he began receiving more and more fan mail thanking him for writing stories on the evils of bigotry, he realized that the X-Men title would make a great vehicle to tackle these particular social issues.

Marvel Comics writers and chief editors Gerry Conway and Roy Thomas wrote an X-Men screenplay in 1984 when Orion Pictures held an option on the film rights, but development stalled when Orion began facing financial troubles. Throughout 1989 and 1990, Stan Lee and Chris Claremont were in discussions with Carolco Pictures for an X-Men film adaptation, with James Cameron as producer and Kathryn Bigelow directing. A story treatment was written by Bigelow, with Bob Hoskins being considered for Wolverine and Angela Bassett being considered for the role of Storm. The deal fell apart when Stan Lee piqued Cameron's interest in a Spider-Man film. Carolco went bankrupt, and the film rights reverted to Marvel. In December 1992, Marvel discussed selling the property to Columbia Pictures to no avail. Meanwhile, Avi Arad produced the animated X-Men TV series for Fox Kids. 20th Century Fox was impressed by the success of the TV show, and producer Lauren Shuler Donner purchased the film rights for them in 1994, bringing Andrew Kevin Walker to write the script.

Walker's draft involved Professor Xavier recruiting Wolverine into the X-Men, which consists of Cyclops, Jean Grey, Iceman, Beast, and Angel. The Brotherhood of Mutants, which consisted of Magneto, Sabretooth, Toad, Juggernaut and the Blob, try to conquer New York City, while Henry Peter Gyrich and Bolivar Trask attack the X-Men with three 8-foot (2.4 m) tall Sentinels. The script focused on the rivalry between Wolverine and Cyclops, as well as the latter's self-doubt as a field leader. Part of the backstory invented for Magneto made him the cause of the Chernobyl disaster. The script also featured the X-Copter and the Danger Room. Walker turned in his second draft in June 1994. Laeta Kalogridis, John Logan, James Schamus, and Joss Whedon were brought on for subsequent rewrites. One of these scripts kept the idea of Magneto turning Manhattan into a "mutant homeland", while another hinged on a romance between Wolverine and Storm. Whedon's draft featured the Danger Room, and concluded with Jean Grey dressed as the Phoenix. According to Entertainment Weekly, this screenplay was rejected because of its "quick-witted pop culture-referencing tone", and the finished film contained only two dialogue exchanges that Whedon had contributed. Michael Chabon pitched a six-page film treatment to Fox in 1996. It focused heavily on character development between Wolverine and Jubilee and included Professor X, Cyclops, Jean Grey, Nightcrawler, Beast, Iceman, and Storm. Under Chabon's plan, the villains would not have been introduced until the second film.

=== Casting ===
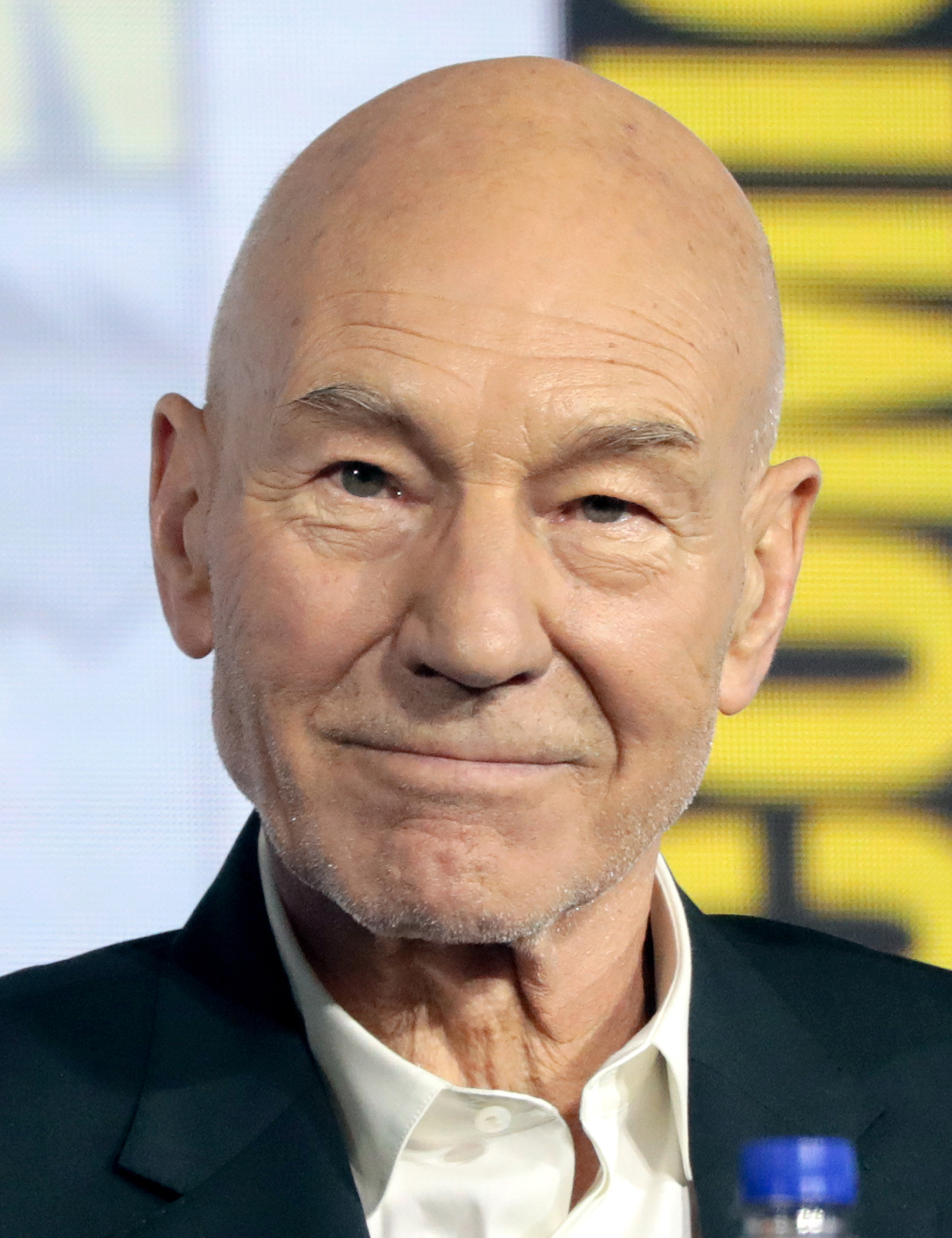
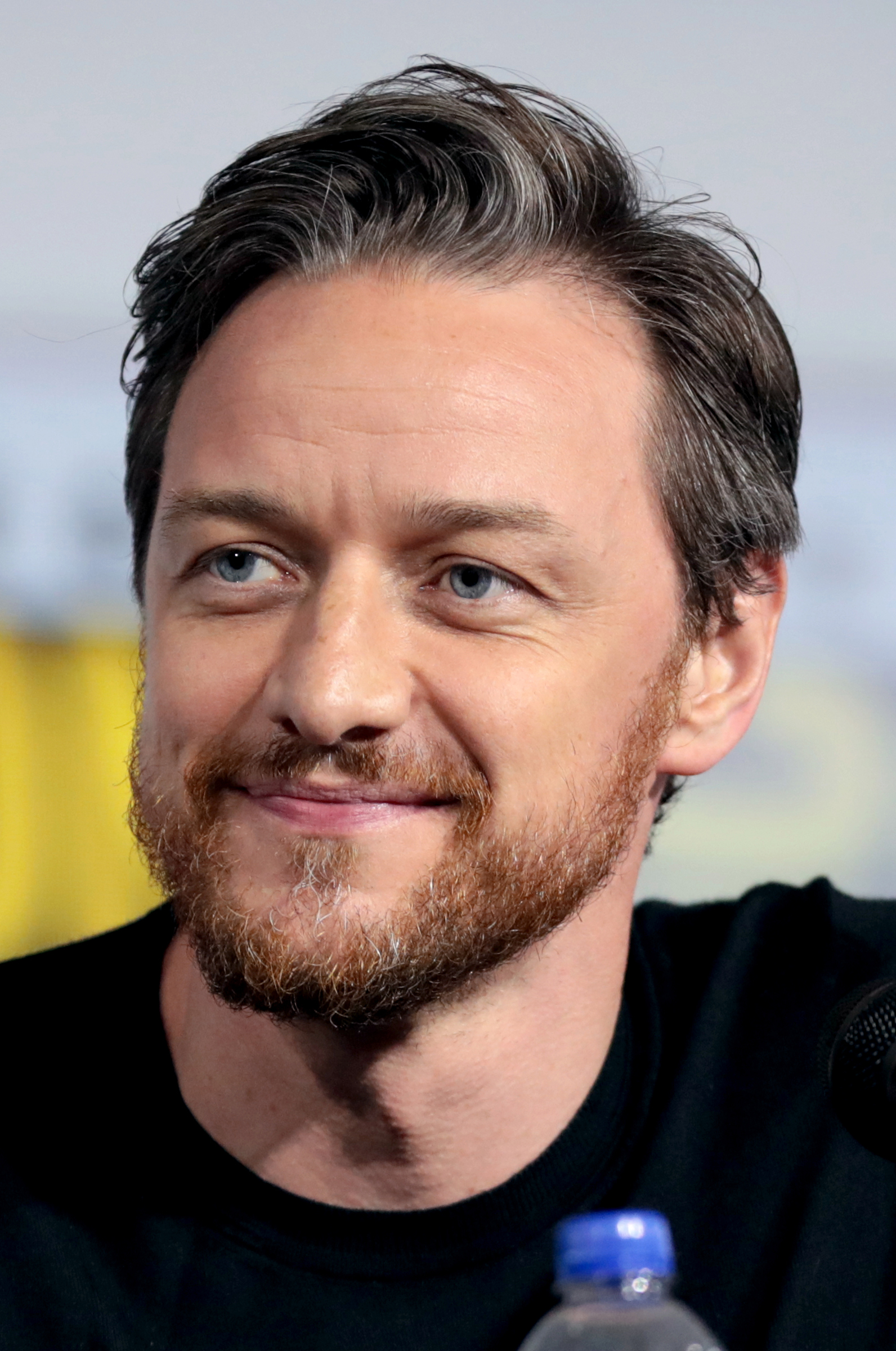
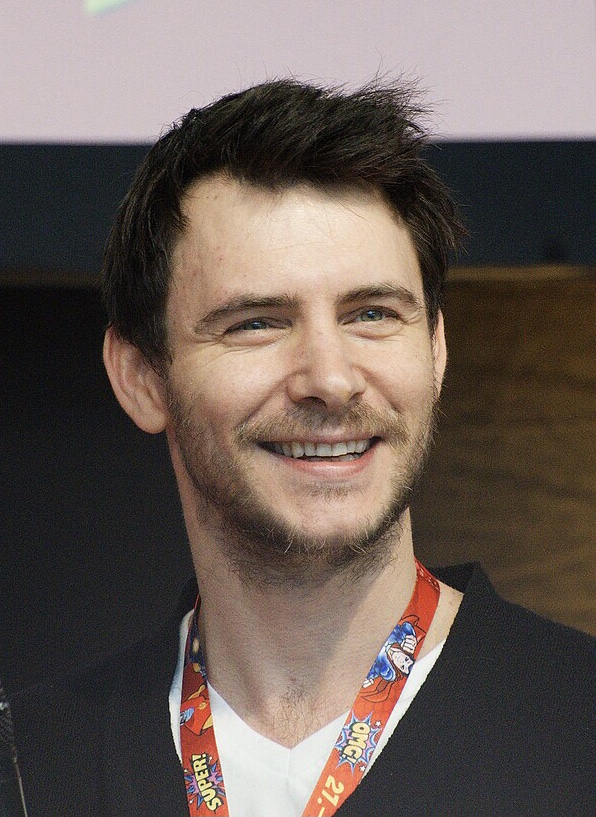
Patrick Stewart (left), James McAvoy (center), and Harry Lloyd (right) have each portrayed Charles Xavier in film and television.

Rather than auditioning other actors, X-Men director Bryan Singer actively pursued Patrick Stewart for the role of Charles Xavier. The success of the Star Trek: The Next Generation TV and film franchises had typecast Stewart as his character, Jean-Luc Picard, and obtaining other roles became difficult. However, in the late 1990s, he accepted the role of Xavier, a role similar in many ways to Picard. He was initially reluctant to sign on to another major franchise, but his interest in working with director Bryan Singer persuaded him. While Singer worked to persuade Stewart to take the role, others who expressed interest in the part included actor Terence Stamp and singer Michael Jackson. Stewart announced that he was leaving the X-Men film franchise after Logan. He accepted an invitation to reprise his role as Xavier in the third season of Legion (a standalone television series initially intended to be set in the same continuity as the X-Men film series and following Xavier's long-lost schizophrenic son David Haller) by its star Dan Stevens, saying he was "Absolutely 100%" willing to reprise the role under such circumstances. However, it was ultimately announced that Harry Lloyd would portray a young Professor X in the third and final season; while having Stewart return as a present-day Xavier had been seriously considered by showrunner Noah Hawley, he elected the older character's presence to be unnecessary upon deciding to have the season revolve around time travel. Stewart reprises his role in the Marvel Cinematic Universe (MCU) film Doctor Strange in the Multiverse of Madness (2022) as an alternate version of Xavier who is a member of the Illuminati. Stewart revealed during an interview with ComicBook.com in February 2023 that he has been told by Marvel Studios to "standby" in case they need him to reprise the role, when asked if he would like to show up in Deadpool & Wolverine (2024) due to his X-Men co-star Hugh Jackman returning as James "Logan" Howlett / Wolverine in that film; Stewart ultimately did not appear in the film. Stewart will reprise the character in the upcoming MCU film Avengers: Doomsday (2026), in which he portrays another alternate version of Xavier who leads the X-Men. Stewart died before the release of Doomsday, making the film his final acting role.

== Fictional character biography ==
=== Early life ===
Charles Xavier was born in Westchester County, New York in 1932. His twin brother, "P. Xavier" was born brain-dead (due to Xavier's abilities of telepathy) and stuck in a coma. In 1944, Xavier met Raven, an orphaned scaly blue-skinned shapeshifter. She had broken into his family's mansion and was scrounging for food while disguised as his mother. Xavier overjoyed to meet someone else like him, invites her to live with him as his sister.

Later, Xavier completed high school at sixteen. He attended University of Oxford, accompanied by Raven. In 1962, Xavier earned Ph.D.s in Genetics, Biophysics, and Psychology after doing research on genetic mutation, which brings him to the attention of CIA agent Moira MacTaggert.

=== First Class and the Cuban Missile Crisis ===
Seeking Xavier's advice on mutation, MacTaggert takes him and Raven to the CIA, where they convince Director McCone that mutants exist and that Sebastian Shaw is a threat. Another CIA officer sponsors the mutants and invites them to the secret "Division X" facility meeting young scientist Hank McCoy, a mutant with prehensile feet and enhanced intelligence.

The Central Intelligence Agency provides him access to Cerebro, which he uses to locate and recruit other mutants for the government. Around the same time, he meets Erik Lehnsherr after saving him from drowning in a botched attempt to kill Shaw. Xavier and Lehnsherr become friends and together they locate mutants for the CIA. Including exotic dancer Angel Salvadore, taxi driver Armando Muñoz, Army prisoner Alex Summers and the young Sean Cassidy.

Once the team is assembled, Shaw and the Hellfire Club attack the CIA facility, kill all the human personnel including Muñoz, and persuade Salvadore to defect. Xavier retreats with the survivors to his Westchester, New York mansion to train them as an independent team of operatives to prevent nuclear war between the US and USSR as a result of the Cuban Missile Crisis. They defeat the threat, but Xavier is unable to convince Lehnsherr not to take his revenge on a helpless Shaw. During the fight, Lehnsherr redirects a series of missiles back toward the ships that fired them after the two governments decided to try to eliminate the mutant 'threat.' Xavier intervenes when MacTaggert fires on Lehnsherr and a deflected bullet strikes Xavier's spine, paralyzing him. Lehnsherr rushes to Xavier's aid, allowing the missiles to fall harmlessly into the ocean. Xavier and Lehnsherr part ways, with Xavier telling his old friend that they do not share the same dream. Xavier severs ties with the US government and changes their team name from "G-Men" to "X-Men," turning his home into a school for mutant children. In order to do this, he erases MacTaggert's memory so she cannot inform her superiors about the school's existence.

=== Original Earth-10005 variant ===
==== Xavier's School for Gifted Youngsters ====
Over the preceding 30 years, Xavier opened his home as "Xavier's School for Gifted Youngsters" and rekindled his relationships with Lehnsherr and MacTaggert.

In the 1970s, Major William Stryker sent his son Jason to Xavier's school in hopes of ridding his mutation, regarding it as a disease that he believed needed be cured. Xavier had no interest or belief in 'curing' mutants, which angered Stryker and pulled Jason out of the school.

In 1979, Xavier helped liberate the mutant children (including Scott Summers, he emits powerful beams of energy from his eyes) held prisoner by Stryker's Weapon X lab on Three Mile Island. Xavier telepathically guides Scott and the rest of the mutants to safety. He takes everyone into his helicopter, to his school. Scott would go on to lead the X-Men.

In 1986, Xavier and Lehnsherr meet young Jean Grey at her parents' house to invite her to join their school. After her parents had been concerned about what they believed to be a type of "illness" in their daughter. Jean is shown levitating multiple cars and other objects with her telekinetic powers and the two elder mutants. Xavier put psychic dampers on her mind to preventing her powers from spiraling out of control and hurting others and herself. As well to control a supposed "dark side" within her subconscious, developing a second personality known as "The Phoenix".

Eventually, anti-mutant U.S. Senator Robert Kelly attempts to pass a "Mutant Registration Act" in Congress, which would force mutants to reveal their identities and abilities. Xavier and Lehnsherr's relationship strains, he eventually leaves the school and re-establishes his Brotherhood of Mutants.

==== The Brotherhood and recruiting Wolverine ====
Through Cerebro, Xavier sends Storm (atmokinesis, flight, temperature and pressure resistance) and Scott to rescue the mutants Logan (with animal-keen senses, regenerative ability and a skeleton reinforced with adamantium) and Rogue (attribute, memory, and power absorption through physical touch) from Sabretooth, a member of Lehnsherr's Brotherhood. Xavier believes that the attack was caused by Lehnsherr and that Logan was the intended target. He gives Logan and Rogue a home in the school, and promises to help Logan remember his past as long as Xavier gets 48 hours to discover why Magneto wants Wolverine.

Xavier is able to control both Sabretooth and Toad at the same time and speaks through them to try to talk Lehnsherr out of his plans against humans. Xavier uses Cerebro to locate Rogue when she runs away but is poisoned when he uses it later due to it having been tampered with by Raven. Xavier later recovers and advises Logan to search Alkali Lake for answers to his past.

==== Stryker's siege and imprisonment ====
Upon learning that the mutant Kurt Wagner attacked the President of the United States, Xavier sends Storm and Jean Grey to bring him in for questioning. Xavier and Scott leave Logan in charge of the school so they can visit Lehnsherr in the plastic prison. In Lehnsherr's cell, Xavier learns that Lehnsherr was brainwashed by Stryker and forced to tell Stryker all about the school and Cerebro. Xavier realizes too late that it is a trap and is captured. He wakes up in Stryker's underground test facility, tied to a chair and fixed to a device that restricts his mental powers. He is left in the room with Stryker's son Jason. Now brainwashed by his father, Jason traps Xavier into various illusions, keeping him in one where Xavier is back in the school, now completely empty, and Jason is portrayed as a scared little girl. To comfort the "girl" and find his students, Xavier goes to use Cerebro. Xavier was captured to power a makeshift Cerebro created by Stryker. When Xavier's powers are magnified by Cerebro, he can locate any mutant in the world. Through intense concentration, he can kill humans or mutants. Under Jason's illusion, Xavier is tricked into concentrating on all of the world's mutants, nearly killing them. He then switches to attacking all of the world's humans after Lehnsherr confronts and threatens Jason. Kurt and Storm rescue Xavier from the illusion. Jean sacrifices herself to save the X-Men, they then fly to Washington to warn the president against the possibility of a mutant/human war.

==== The Phoenix, apparent death and the Sentinels ====
Months later, Xavier expresses worry over Scott's grief over Jean's death and appoints Storm as his successor as headmaster of the school. Sensing trouble, Xavier sends Logan and Storm to investigate Alkali Lake. When they arrive, they find only telekinetically floating rocks, Scott's glasses, and an unconscious Grey. Xavier sedates her and tells Logan that he had kept her powers in check with mental barriers. When Jean awakens as The Phoenix and escapes, Xavier tracks her down to her old home and tries to convince her to return. Rather than starting a fight outside her house, Xavier lets Lehnsherr come with him. Xavier tries to calmly talk Jean into returning to the mansion, but Lehnsherr turns the unstable Jean against Xavier. This causes Xavier to panic and tell Jean that she is a danger to everyone, including herself. He uses the fact that Jean killed Scott to try to make her realize her potential for evil, but he only angers the Phoenix more. After much argument, the Phoenix manifests its great powers as she tries to keep Xavier from re-establishing the psychic blocks to imprison it again. Infuriated both by Xavier's meddling in her head and Lehnsherr, who insinuates that Xavier wishes to restrain her and "give her the cure," she uses her mind to first lift her house into the air and then cause Xavier to explode into ashes. Xavier was buried on the campus grounds, with Scott to his right and eventually Jean to Scott's right.

However, he was able to survive his encounter with Jean by transferring his consciousness into his brother's comatose body on Muir Island under the care of McTaggert. Since P. Xavier was born brain-dead and stuck in a coma, Xavier couldn't walk in his brother's body and had to use his old wheelchair.

Years later, Xavier and Lehnsherr warn Logan (who has returned from Japan) of an upcoming crisis. Amazed, Logan asks how he is still alive. Xavier reminds Logan that he once said long ago that Logan is not the only one with gifts.

==== War with the Sentinels ====
By 2023, the Sentinels have decimated the mutant race and virtually conquered Earth, forcing the X-Men to seek a new method of combating their threat. With Kitty Pryde having developed the ability to project an individual's consciousness back into their past selves, Xavier proposes that he be sent back into his past self in 1973 so that he can prevent Mystique from killing Bolivar Trask after he proposed the Sentinel program, believing that this death is the primary catalyst for this timeline. However, Kitty explains that the process of projecting someone's mind into the past would be too psychologically traumatic, even for Xavier to survive it, prompting Logan to volunteer to go back instead as his power would allow him to recover from the damage inflicted.

The young Xavier briefly communicates with Xavier, Logan's projected mind acting as a psychic 'bridge' between the past and the future. Xavier convinces his younger self to maintain his faith that humanity can rise above its mistakes rather than judge it by when it stumbles despite the future he lives in. He offers his young self advice on how to get past the fear of emotional pain that is hindering his powers by telling him that he can accept the pain of others by focusing on the hope for a better future. Xavier also allows his young counterpart to see his memories, which include the differences he had made in his students.

The X-Men make their last stand as an onslaught of Sentinels attacks the temple, with most of the mutants perishing while trying to buy more time. In 1973, Xavier telepathically convinces Raven to spare Trask, leading the public to realize that a mutant saved the President. As a result, the Sentinel program is decommissioned, altering the timeline and erasing the dark future of 2023 from history.

=== Revised Earth-10005 variant ===
==== Second chance ====
In 1973, Xavier is seen to be bitter and leading a reclusive life, having given up on his dream of peaceful coexistence between humans and mutants due to the Vietnam War, Lehnsherr being imprisoned for assassinating JFK and the failure of his school. Despite having been paralyzed by Lehnsherr a decade prior, he regained his mobility from Hank McCoy's serum, but at the cost of suppressing his mutation. Xavier is living under the care of Hank, is rude include uses profane language, occasionally behaves violently, and has turned to alcoholism to cope with his failures.

Logan (whose mind traveled back in time into his 1973 body) goes to the X-Mansion, learning from Hank about the broken Xavier. Hoping to reunite with Raven, Xavier agrees to help Logan. They recruit Peter Maximoff, a mutant with superhuman speed, and break Lehnsherr out of The Pentagon, learning that he was in fact attempting to save JFK, who was also a mutant. Raven discovers Trask has been experimenting on mutants and plots to assassinate him at the Paris Peace Accords, but Xavier, McCoy, and Logan foil her attempt. Returning to the X-Mansion, Xavier abandons the serum and, by reading Logan's mind, communicates with his future self, who inspires him to protect the future between mutants and humans. After Xavier uses his mutant-tracking computer Cerebro to find Raven, he, McCoy, and Logan travel to Washington, D.C. to stop her from assassinating Trask.

At a ceremony where Nixon unveils the Sentinels, Lehnsherr activates the Sentinels (who secretly taken control of the Sentinels by infusing them with steel) and barricades the White House by lifting the RFK Stadium over it. During the battle, Nixon, Trask, and a disguised Raven retreat to the White House Bunker. However, Lehnsherr rips the bunker out of the building to kill everyone inside. Raven reveals herself and subdues Lehnsherr with a plastic gun, saving Nixon and his cabinet. Before she can kill Trask, Xavier telepathically convinces her to spare him, leading the public to realize that a mutant saved the President. As a result, the Sentinel program is decommissioned, altering the timeline and erasing the dark future of 2023 from history.

Shortly after, Xavier adopts a young Jean Grey after her psychic powers cause a car accident that kills her mother and her resentful father abandons her. The experience deeply traumatizes Jean and Xavier alters her memories to make her forget that she caused the accident and that her father survived, in order to prevent the trauma from making her psychic mind unstable. He begins teaching Jean, trying to help her develop more gradual control of her powers without the telepathic blocks of the original timeline.

==== Age of Apocalypse ====
In 1983, Xavier believes that humans and mutants have now achieved peace, prompting him to focus on building up the Institute as a more conventional school, intending to bring humans into the school as well as mutants, although Hank and Raven each make preparations for a future conflict to prepare for the worst even if Hank wants to hope. Xavier meets Alex's younger brother, Scott. When Xavier hears rumors of an ancient mutant, he makes contact with a new foe, Apocalypse, while using Cerebro. This allows Apocalypse to take remote control of Xavier's telepathy and use him to make the governments launch all their nuclear missiles, before teleporting to the mansion to abduct Xavier. Although Apocalypse forces Xavier to transmit a telepathic message to the human race by enhancing his powers (proclaiming Apocalypse's intentions to launch a plan of conquest against the world) Xavier uses the opportunity to transmit a private message to Jean with his location, and concludes the message by telling those with power to protect those without rather than to prepare for conquest.

Apocalypse attempts to use his equipment to transfer his essence into Xavier's body, allowing him to gain full access to Xavier's telepathy. Although the energy shield of the transference burns off Xavier's hair as he tries to escape, he is finally rescued by Kurt Wagner before the process can be completed. During the later conflict, Xavier uses the still-existing telepathic link between himself and Apocalypse to attack the latter on the psychic plane while the other X-Men confront him in the real world. In the end, Xavier is only a distraction until Jean can unleash her own full power. At the end of the film, Xavier is bald and wearing his usual suit as he sits outside the Danger Room, watching the new X-Men prepare for training under Raven as their new field leader.

==== D'Bari invasion and the Dark Phoenix ====
In early 1990s, the X-Men are enjoying a period of acceptance as public heroes, to the point that the President calls them for assistance in dealing with a shuttle accident, although Raven expresses concern that Xavier is more focused on their current celebrity status than his original goal of coexistence between mutants and humans. The situation becomes dangerous when Jean absorbs a mysterious space anomaly that almost destroys the shuttle, elevating her already-formidable powers and unlocks her suppressed memories. The trauma from her childhood causes Jean's mind to be unstable and make her psychic powers uncontrollable, causing harm to people around her.

The traumatized Jean accidentally kills Raven, which leads to Hank rejecting Xavier to join Lehnsherr in seeking revenge on Jean for Raven's death. When an alien race known as the D'Bari confronts Jean with the goal of draining her new power to allow them to xenoform Earth into their new homeworld, the X-Men come back together to protect her. This show of solidarity helps her achieve a new sense of mental stability before she departs Earth. Hank takes over as headmaster of the school while Xavier decides to 'retire' for a time.

==== Modern day ====
Over the preceding 30 years, Xavier is reinstated as the headmaster of Xavier's School for Gifted Youngsters and Jean returns back to Earth.

At some point, Logan joined the X-Men and ultimately became a history teacher at Xavier's school. The team went on several adventures together, including one involving a fight at the Statue of Liberty. In the years that followed, comic books about the X-Men's escapades were produced.

In 2023, the consciousness of the original timeline's Logan awakes in his body but with no memory of the new timeline. He is happy to see Jean and Scott alive, as they never died in this timeline. Logan asks Xavier for information about modern history from 1973 to the present. Upon realizing that the Logan from the original timeline has returned, Xavier assents.

==== Fall of the X-Men and death ====
By 2028, (Note: Hugh Jackman and Logan director James Mangold stated that they deliberately left it ambiguous on whether the film is set in the revised Earth-10005 timeline introduced in Days of Future Past, as they aimed for Logan to be as standalone as possible. Debate continues over which universe or timeline the film takes place in, with some sources placing it in Earth-17315.) the mutant population is dwindling because of Transigen, a genetically engineered anti-mutant virus which affects all the world's mutants. Xavier develops Alzheimer's and inadvertently kills several hundred people, including seven mutants, in a seizure-induced psychic attack in Westchester County, leaving Logan among the only survivors. Mutants are hunted down en masse by humans, and Logan and Xavier are branded international fugitives. Logan asks the assistance of Caliban to help care for Xavier. He and Caliban take Xavier to a place in Mexico near the US border, caring for him over the following year while attempting to raise money to purchase a Sunseeker yacht for the two of them to live on in peace.

In 2029, Logan's healing factor is deteriorating due to the virus, causing him to finally age past his prime and suffer from terminal adamantium poisoning. Xavier senses the presence of another mutant in Texas named Laura who has a lot in common with Logan, and the two decide to help keep her safe from Pierce and the Reavers who are trying to capture her. They drive toward North Dakota as Laura's previous caretaker informed them of a mutant safe haven located nearby. They take shelter at a hotel in Oklahoma City. However, when the Reavers catch up to them and enter their hotel room, Xavier has another seizure, causing him to telepathically freeze everyone in the area until Logan gives him a suppressant. The trio is eventually given shelter by a farming family, the Munsons, after Charles secretly helps them round up their horses during a highway incident. When the Munsons offer them a meal and a place to stay for the night, Xavier tells Logan the importance of life and family before going to sleep. Later that night, while Logan is away, Xavier realizes the truth about what he did to the X-Men and confesses his guilt to a man he thinks is Logan, but is revealed to be X-24, a perfect clone of Logan, who fatally stabs Charles and kills the Munsons. Logan desperately tries to save Xavier, but to no avail. His last words are the name of the boat they were going to buy: "The Sunseeker". Logan eventually manages to escape with Laura and Xavier's body, and later, tearfully buries him near an isolated lake.

== Alternate versions ==
=== Legion (2017–19) ===
Harry Lloyd portrays an alternate young Xavier in the 2019 third and final season of Legion. When the series begins, David Haller learns that he was adopted by the family that raised him and eventually deduces that his real father fought Amahl Farouk on the astral plane, but had to give his son up for adoption to protect him from the entity. During Farouk's interrogation of David's adopted sister regarding his real father, a glimpse of Xavier's wheelchair (from the X-Men films) is shown. In the third season, a now-supervillain cult leader David uses the mutant "Switch" to travel back in time to prevent his parents from giving him up for adoption: Xavier is shown to have met David's mother Gabrielle when she was originally in a catatonic state at a mental hospital following her time in concentration camps during World War II; after reviving her with his telepathy, the couple fell in love, and had David. In the alternate timeline resulting from David's interference, he attempts to convince his father of Farouk being evil, only for the Farouk's future self to reveal David's true nature to Xavier in calm conversation, encouraging him not to give him up for adoption and leave his younger self be to peacefully reign, showing them visions of what would happen to them should they consider evil. Content, Xavier returns to Gabrielle and embraces the younger David, as the older David and Farouk fade out of existence.

=== Multiverse ===
Multiple variants of Xavier appear in the Marvel Cinematic Universe, portrayed by Stewart.

==== Earth-838 ====
On Earth-838, Charles Xavier is the leader of the Illuminati, a group of enhanced individuals that monitors the multiverse for threats. He and the group hold Stephen Strange accountable for his actions against the multiverse, with Xavier advocating Strange to be spared, before they are interrupted by the Wanda Maximoff of Earth-616, who has possessed her Earth-838 counterpart. While Maximoff massacres the Illuminati, Xavier encourages Strange to locate the Book of Vishanti, locked away by 838-Strange before his death, to use it against Maximoff, before telepathically taking over her mind to try to communicate with and free her Earth-838 counterpart. Maximoff takes back control and subsequently kills Xavier by twisting his head off, the psychic shock of which kills him in the real world, leading Xavier to drop dead in his chair.

==== Binary's universe ====
In an alternate universe, Xavier is a mutant and the founder of the X-Men who are allies with Maria Rambeau / Binary. Hank McCoy recovers Monica Rambeau from Earth-616 at the X-Mansion. Following her displacement into their world, due to an averted incursion between it and Earth-616, Monica awakens and meets McCoy and Rambeau, whom she never parented in her reality. Xavier wanted an update of the situation by McCoy.

==== Death of the X-Men ====
In an alternate universe, Xavier was a mutant and the founder of the X-Men. At some point, the X-Men including Xavier were killed by a group of mutant-hunting humans while Logan / Wolverine was out binge-drinking at a bar. After this incident, his actions led to the desecration of the legacy of the X-Men. Logan deeply misses his teammates, and he memorializes them and Xavier by wearing his X-Men uniform under normal clothes. He spends his days depressed and drinking until Wade Wilson / Deadpool takes him out of his universe in a multiversal adventure where Wolverine rediscovers his heroic nature.

== Accolades ==
Both Stewart and McAvoy have been nominated for awards for their performances in the role.

Award	Year	Actor	Category	Nominated work	Result	Ref.
Saturn Awards	2001	Patrick Stewart	Best Supporting Actor	X-Men	Nominated	
Scream Awards	2011	James McAvoy	Best Fantasy Actor	X-Men: First Class	Nominated	
Scream Awards	2011	James McAvoy	Best Superhero	X-Men: First Class	Nominated	
People's Choice Awards	2012	James McAvoy	Favorite Movie Superhero	X-Men: First Class	Nominated	
Kids' Choice Awards	2017	James McAvoy	Favorite Squad	X-Men: Apocalypse	Nominated	
Broadcast Film Critics Association	2018	Patrick Stewart	Best Supporting Actor	Logan	Nominated	
Detroit Film Critics Society	2018	Patrick Stewart	Best Supporting Actor	Logan	Nominated	
Houston Film Critics Society	2018	Patrick Stewart	Best Supporting Actor	Logan	Nominated	
North Carolina Film Critics Association	2018	Patrick Stewart	Best Supporting Actor	Logan	Nominated	
North Texas Film Critics Association	2018	Patrick Stewart	Best Supporting Actor	Logan	Nominated	
Phoenix Film Critics Society	2018	Patrick Stewart	Best Supporting Actor	Logan	Nominated	
Saturn Awards	2018	Patrick Stewart	Best Supporting Actor	Logan	Won	
Seattle Film Critics Awards	2018	Patrick Stewart	Best Supporting Actor	Logan	Nominated	
Teen Choice Awards	2019	James McAvoy	Choice Sci-Fi/Fantasy Movie Actor	Dark Phoenix	Nominated	
