= Chapter 11 (Legion) =

- Legion episode
- Episode no.: Season 2 Episode 3
- Directed by: Sarah Adina Smith
- Written by: Noah Hawley; Nathaniel Halpern
- Cinematography by: Dana Gonzales
- Editing by: Curtis Thurber
- Production code: XLN02003
- Original air date: April 17, 2018
- Running time: 52 minutes

Episode chronology
← Previous "Chapter 10"	Next → "Chapter 12"
- Legion season 2

"Chapter 11" is the third episode of the second season of the American surrealist superhero thriller television series Legion, based on the Marvel Comics character of the same name. It was written by series creator Noah Hawley and co-executive producer Nathaniel Halpern and directed by Sarah Adina Smith. It originally aired on FX on April 17, 2018.

The series follows David Haller, a "mutant" diagnosed with schizophrenia at a young age, as he tries to control his psychic powers and combat the sinister forces trying to control him. Eventually, he joins the government agency Division 3 to prevent his nemesis, fellow psychic mutant Amahl Farouk, from finding his original body. In the episode, the Mi-Go monk has infected most of Division 3 with the Catalyst, prompting David and Cary to release them.

According to Nielsen Media Research, the episode was seen by an estimated 0.380 million household viewers and gained a 0.2 ratings share among adults aged 18–49. The episode received positive reviews from critics, who praised the character development and performances, although some expressed criticism for its pacing and lack of progress in the main storyline.

== Plot ==
In the past, the Mi-Go monks retrieve Farouk's body after his defeat. They bury it in a part of its monastery, although the monks are haunted by noises coming from the body.

Division 3 soldiers discover that the monk was in the same room as the people infected with the Catalyst and then walked through the building. As such, the installation is placed in a lockdown. Looking for answers, David visits Lenny, which gets him to Farouk. Farouk states that the monk was an asymptomatic carrier and even signals that the future version of Syd will stop existing if he changes the future. When David goes back to the real world, he finds that the monk has infected everyone, except for Cary.

Discovering an infected Ptonomy, David and Cary enter his mind. His mind consists of a maze: which consists of the person experiencing his deepest desire. They manage to convince him to wake up, freeing him from the virus. They encounter an infected Melanie and they enter her mind, which consists of a black room with a computer system. After interacting with her, they manage to get her to the real world. However, the monk finds David and takes him to experience his memories at the monastery. David finds that through Farouk's body, the monks were all infected by the Catalyst, driving some of them to suicide.

The monk has incapacitated Admiral Fukyama and uses the Vermillion to communicate his intentions: he wants "the weapon" to kill Farouk. Melanie deduces that the weapon is David, who walks into the room. Before the monk reveals that David works with Farouk, David teleports him and himself to the roof of the building. While David tries to excuse his reasoning, the monk does not intend to help Farouk. He then jumps off the building to his death, rather than change his mind. David then encounters an infected Syd and enters her mind, where David walks through a snowstorm towards an igloo.

At the beginning of the episode, the Narrator explains the Nocebo effect, where the human body experiences a negative reaction to harm. He also states that this could lead to a contagious case of mass hysteria, highlighting the dancing plague of 1518, the Tanganyika laughter epidemic, and the Ganesha drinking milk miracle. He describes it as a conversion disorder, where the body will respond to the idea of an illness as the real illness, which by itself could be contagious.

== Production ==
=== Development ===
In March 2018, it was reported that the third episode of the season would be titled "Chapter 11", and was to be directed by Sarah Adina Smith and written by series creator Noah Hawley and co-executive producer Nathaniel Halpern. This was Hawley's sixth writing credit, Halpern's fifth writing credit, and Smith's first directing credit.

== Reception ==
=== Viewers ===
In its original American broadcast, "Chapter 11" was seen by an estimated 0.380 million household viewers and gained a 0.2 ratings share among adults aged 18–49, according to Nielsen Media Research. This means that 0.2 percent of all households with televisions watched the episode. This was a 14% decrease in viewership from the previous episode, which was watched by 0.439 million viewers with a 0.2 in the 18-49 demographics.

=== Critical reviews ===
"Chapter 11" received mostly positive reviews from critics. The review aggregator website Rotten Tomatoes reported an 80% approval rating with an average rating of 7.9/10 for the episode, based on 15 reviews. The site's consensus states: "The third episode of Legion's second season proves to be a visually stunning - if occasionally inconsistent - dose of surrealism."

Ryan Matsunaga of IGN gave the episode a "great" 8.3 out of 10 and wrote in his verdict, "Legion is promising some big things to come, but despite being three episodes deep into the season, its biggest questions feel no closer to being answered. For most other shows, this would be a major hindrance to enjoying it week to week. Legion however manages to keep things interesting, despite an ever more complicated narrative. All of the ingredients feel present for a mindblowing finale, we'll just have to keep our fingers crossed that it'll all feel worth it in the end."

Alex McLevy of The A.V. Club gave the episode an "A-" grade and wrote, "The series is trying to get at the ways in which we all construct our own realities, once more attempting to close the gap between David's immense power and the rest of us."

Alan Sepinwall of Uproxx wrote, "It's another visually inventive episode that feels a bit low in calories, particularly when we get to the obligatory sequence where David travels into the minds of his friends to free them from the monk's spell. This is familiar genre stuff, the kind every show like this eventually tries because it's a more interesting way to delve into the psyches of the characters than to, say, put them in therapy for an hour." Evan Lewis of Entertainment Weekly wrote, "The resurfacing of some horror elements is a good look for Legion, although the show hasn't quite made it back to season 1's levels of psychological spookiness. Part of that difference stems from how powerful David has become."

Oliver Sava of Vulture gave the episode a 2 star rating out of 5 and wrote, "There's so much rich material to explore here, especially in regards to how people emotionally process trauma, but that's all getting lost in the larger Shadow King narrative." Nick Harley of Den of Geek gave the episode a 4 star rating out of 5 and wrote, "There's so much to like in this episode, even if it ultimately just shows us the whereabouts and background story of Farouk's body and really nothing more, save for Ptonomy being infected by that little gooey madness creature. With Syd roaming the hallways of Division 3 as a cat, another electric Aubrey Plaza showcase, and the striking images of the monk stuck on the wall, Future Syd's spelling, and that damn minotaur again, this episode's smoke is so engrossing, it doesn’t matter that we're lacking some more fire." Josh Jackson of Paste gave the episode a 8.8 rating out of 10 and wrote, "Of course, this being Legion, even reality is filled with the stuff of dreams."
