= Chapter 17 (Legion) =

- Legion episode
- Episode no.: Season 2 Episode 9
- Directed by: Noah Hawley
- Written by: Noah Hawley; Nathaniel Halpern
- Cinematography by: Polly Morgan; Erik Messerschmidt
- Editing by: Regis Kimble; Todd Desrosiers; Curtis Thurber
- Production code: XLN02011
- Original air date: May 29, 2018
- Running time: 41 minutes

Guest appearances
- Katie Aselton as Amy Haller; Vanessa DuBasso as Salmon

Episode chronology
| ← Previous "Chapter 16" | Next → "Chapter 18" |
- Legion season 2

"Chapter 17" is the ninth episode of the second season of the American surrealist superhero thriller television series Legion, based on the Marvel Comics character of the same name. It was written by series creator Noah Hawley and co-executive producer Nathaniel Halpern and directed by Hawley. It originally aired on FX on May 29, 2018.

The series follows David Haller, a "mutant" diagnosed with schizophrenia at a young age, as he tries to control his psychic powers and combat the sinister forces trying to control him. Eventually, he joins the government agency Division 3 to prevent his nemesis, fellow psychic mutant Amahl Farouk, from finding his original body. In the episode, Melanie's background during the season is revealed, including how Farouk influenced her decisions.

According to Nielsen Media Research, the episode was seen by an estimated 0.362 million household viewers and gained a 0.2 ratings share among adults aged 18–49. The episode received generally positive reviews from critics, who praised the performances, although it also received criticism for its pacing, narrative and its exploration on certain themes.

== Plot ==
Thirteen days prior to the events of the previous episode, Melanie uses drugs to cope with losing Oliver again. Oliver appears in her mind, showing their life when they were younger in an attempt to make her forget about her feelings whenever he left.

Farouk starts manipulating Melanie's perception of reality, making her reveal any important plan from David. David, meanwhile, communicates with Cary and Kerry in retrieving an important weapon from Division 3 and leaving it in a Chinese restaurant parking lot. Back in Division 3, David asks Clark for help in retrieving "the clock", only to be knocked unconscious by Melanie, on Farouk's orders.

Lenny, now free from Division 3, returns to her old house where she starts using drugs again with her old friends. However, she is still haunted by Amy, who manifests in her consciousness and reprimands her for wasting her body just on drugs. Motivated by Amy and the vision she experienced earlier, Lenny leaves her house to help David. She arrives at the parking lot and enters the car, which vanishes in front of Cary and Kerry. The car transports her to the desert before bursting in flames. Lenny retrieves the weapon and starts walking. With a GPS tracking unit installed in the weapon, Cary and Kerry also set out for the desert.

== Production ==
=== Development ===
In May 2018, it was reported that the ninth episode of the season would be titled "Chapter 17", and was to be directed by series creator Noah Hawley and written by Hawley and co-executive producer Nathaniel Halpern. This was Hawley's twelfth writing credit, Halpern's ninth writing credit, and Hawley's second directing credit.

== Reception ==
=== Viewers ===
In its original American broadcast, "Chapter 17" was seen by an estimated 0.362 million household viewers and gained a 0.2 ratings share among adults aged 18–49, according to Nielsen Media Research. This means that 0.2 percent of all households with televisions watched the episode. This was a 12% decrease in viewership from the previous episode, which was watched by 0.409 million viewers with a 0.2 in the 18-49 demographics.

=== Critical reviews ===
"Chapter 17" received generally positive reviews from critics. The review aggregator website Rotten Tomatoes reported an 86% approval rating with an average rating of 6.8/10 for the episode, based on 7 reviews.

Alex McLevy of The A.V. Club gave the episode a "B+" grade and wrote, "One of the more purely enjoyable elements of 'Chapter 17' is the opportunity to finally spend some quality time with the Loudermilks."

Evan Lewis of Entertainment Weekly wrote, "With only two episodes left, Legion still has plenty to sort out, but there should be enough time to work up to a satisfying conclusion if the show starts playing the game instead of adding more pieces to the gameboard." Beth Elderkin of Gizmodo wrote, "It's unclear if the latest episode of Legion is positioning itself as social commentary, a 'come to Jesus' moment, or just another hour of prep for that final battle we've been waiting for all season. But after almost two seasons of this show, what is clear is that Legion's female characters are trapped. By love, by 'our men.' And I'm ready for them to break free."

Oliver Sava of Vulture gave the episode a 2 star rating out of 5 and wrote, "'Chapter 17' draws attention to Legion's difficulty bringing dimension to its supporting ensemble." Nick Harley of Den of Geek gave the episode a 3.5 star rating out of 5 and wrote, "So while David's plan only inches along incrementally, there are some fun developments in the season's shortest episode to date. We were also spared a delusion PowerPoint presentation, so that was a plus too. All and all a solid, if not outstanding, episode. Next week was supposed to be the season finale, let's hope we still get something with some oomph."
