= Chapter 12 (Legion) =

- Legion episode
- Episode no.: Season 2 Episode 4
- Directed by: Ellen Kuras
- Written by: Noah Hawley; Nathaniel Halpern
- Cinematography by: Polly Morgan
- Editing by: Regis Kimble
- Production code: XLN02004
- Original air date: April 24, 2018
- Running time: 42 minutes

Guest appearance
- Lily Rabe as Joan Barrett

Episode chronology
← Previous "Chapter 11"	Next → "Chapter 13"
- Legion season 2

"Chapter 12" is the fourth episode of the second season of the American surrealist superhero thriller television series Legion, based on the Marvel Comics character of the same name. It was written by series creator Noah Hawley and co-executive producer Nathaniel Halpern and directed by Ellen Kuras. It originally aired on FX on April 24, 2018.

The series follows David Haller, a "mutant" diagnosed with schizophrenia at a young age, as he tries to control his psychic powers and combat the sinister forces trying to control him. Eventually, he joins the government agency Division 3 to prevent his nemesis, fellow psychic mutant Amahl Farouk, from finding his original body. In the episode, David enters Syd's mind to release her, discovering part of her life.

According to Nielsen Media Research, the episode was seen by an estimated 0.434 million household viewers and gained a 0.2 ratings share among adults aged 18–49. The episode received positive reviews from critics, who praised Keller's performance and character development, although some criticized the writing and pacing.

== Plot ==
Inside the igloo, Syd (Rachel Keller) experiences some of her childhood memories, which include disliking people touching her. This also caused her to become a victim of bullying, which also led to self-harm.

David (Dan Stevens) meets with Syd inside her mind, but she is dismissive of his intentions. David struggles in finding her deepest desire, as she is not even interested in touching people without worrying about her powers. Syd's power began to surface when a boy kissed her and caused the body swap, and then used the boy's body to hit her bullies and face no consequences. It is also revealed that she swapped bodies with her mother and then had sex with her boyfriend. However, she accidentally swapped back into her real body before finishing, leading to the man's arrest.

Back in the real world, Division 3 is cured of the Catalyst, with Clark (Hamish Linklater) deducing that the monk's death may have something to do with it. In Syd's mind, David constantly fails in realizing Syd's deepest desire, which would get him to relive her entire life again. Eventually, Syd explains that her desire involves recognizing that love is not going to save them, but pain can give them the strength for love. This convinces her to finally wake up with David in the real world. In the real world, David and Syd find that Division 3 has retrieved a person: Lenny (Aubrey Plaza).

== Production ==
=== Development ===
In March 2018, it was reported that the fourth episode of the season would be titled "Chapter 12", and was to be directed by Ellen Kuras and written by series creator Noah Hawley and co-executive producer Nathaniel Halpern. This was Hawley's seventh writing credit, Halpern's sixth writing credit, and Kuras' first directing credit.

== Reception ==
=== Viewers ===
In its original American broadcast, "Chapter 12" was seen by an estimated 0.434 million household viewers and gained a 0.2 ratings share among adults aged 18–49, according to Nielsen Media Research. This means that 0.2 percent of all households with televisions watched the episode. This was a 14% increase in viewership from the previous episode, which was watched by 0.380 million viewers with a 0.2 in the 18-49 demographics.

=== Critical reviews ===
"Chapter 12" received mostly positive reviews from critics. The review aggregator website Rotten Tomatoes reported a 90% approval rating with an average rating of 8.1/10 for the episode, based on 10 reviews.

Alex McLevy of The A.V. Club gave the episode an "A-" grade and wrote, "The Groundhog Day shenanigans ultimately come across like a scolding lecture staged for our benefit, not for David's. He's just happy it's over."

Alan Sepinwall of Uproxx wrote, "But where I can often just accept Legion's stylistic flourishes as something superficially impressive that doesn't withstand closer scrutiny, 'Chapter 12' put in the real work of placing us inside Syd's head, experiencing her life the way she has, feeling the same hurt and alienation she's suffered. It's less action-packed than the series can be, but on the whole this is one of my favorite episodes of either season." Evan Lewis of Entertainment Weekly wrote, "As a deep character dive on Syd, who often tends to feel aloof and underdeveloped, this episode is a welcome change of pace, and it brings the scale of the stakes from global catastrophe to personal development in a way the season has desperately needed."

Oliver Sava of Vulture gave the episode a 4 star rating out of 5 and wrote, "'Chapter 12' delivers exactly what I was asking for in last episode's recap, using the mental-maze conceit to explore a character's accumulated trauma and create a satisfying arc where they push through the pain to become a stronger person." Nick Harley of Den of Geek gave the episode a 4 star rating out of 5 and wrote, "For the first time this season, it feels like David and Syd are back on the same wavelength. The episode ends with Lenny showing up at Division 3, perplexingly in the flesh, but after the dazzling, emotional 43-minute journey we've been on through Syd's memories, the cliffhanger doesn't hit as hard as it maybe should. That's a credit to the truly moving, sublime nature of 'Chapter 12'. Hopefully there are more standalone gems like this ahead in the show's future." Josh Jackson of Paste gave the episode a 8.7 rating out of 10 and wrote, "It's a breathless episode and a massive shift in tone. Are we to trust Future Syd when she tells David to help Farouk, the Season One villain who was basically a parasite inside David's mind? Does she have David's best interest in mind? Or humanity's? The show has made the rest of Division 3 seem like villains at times and reluctant allies at others, but is David now working against the greater good?"
