= Chapter 9 (Legion) =

- Legion episode
- Episode no.: Season 2 Episode 1
- Directed by: Tim Mielants
- Written by: Noah Hawley; Nathaniel Halpern
- Cinematography by: Dana Gonzales
- Editing by: Regis Kimble
- Production code: XLN02001
- Original air date: April 3, 2018
- Running time: 61 minutes

Episode chronology
← Previous "Chapter 8"	Next → "Chapter 10"
- Legion season 2

"Chapter 9" is the first episode of the second season of the American surrealist superhero thriller television series Legion, based on the Marvel Comics character of the same name. It was written by series creator Noah Hawley and co-executive producer Nathaniel Halpern and directed by Tim Mielants. It originally aired on FX on April 3, 2018.

The series follows David Haller, a "mutant" diagnosed with schizophrenia at a young age, as he tries to control his psychic powers and combat the sinister forces trying to control him. In the episode, David is found by Division 3 and Summerland, with both facilities working together in finding Farouk, who has possessed Oliver's body.

According to Nielsen Media Research, the episode was seen by an estimated 0.669 million household viewers and gained a 0.3 ratings share among adults aged 18–49. The episode received critical acclaim, with critics praising the writing, performances, visual style and originality.

== Plot ==
Oliver and Lenny are relaxing in a pool, recognizing that they are trapped. They are revealed to be inside the mind of Amahl Farouk, who in turn has taken over Oliver's body in the real world.

Division 3 has retrieved David and placed him on a quarantine. Cary manages to get him to wake up from his coma. While eating with Ptonomy, David is told that Summerland now works with Division 3 to capture Farouk, after Melanie convinced them that most mutants aren't a threat. Their boss is Admiral Fukyama, who has a basket placed over his head. He also reconciles with Syd, who informs him that he was missing for almost an entire year. Unknown to the others, David hears many versions of himself speaking in his head.

For the past year, Division 3 has tried to locate Farouk, recognizing that he possessed Oliver's body. However, with each encounter, the team finds that Farouk infects people with a psychic "virus", the Catalyst, that paralyses their bodies but causes their teeth to continuously chatter. After talking with Clark, David talks with Admiral Fukyama, realizing that he is unable to read his mind. Fukyama instructs David to meet with Cary, who created an amplification chamber that will help him relive his memories and try to find Farouk, who wants to find his original body to unleash his powers.

Inside the chamber, David finds himself at a nightclub, meeting Lenny and Oliver. He relives a memory of a monk and then engaging in a dance battle with Lenny and Oliver. After leaving the chamber and meeting with Syd, he gives her a compass that will always lead her to him, promising to not keep any secrets between them. It is revealed that after David was trapped by the orb, he met a future version of Syd, who can't talk. Using a light wand, she explains that Farouk wants to find his body and David must help him. This confuses David just as Syd disappears. In the present, David's mind goes back to the nightclub, where he meets again with Lenny and Oliver.

Throughout the episode, a Narrator explains many concepts. The first involves leading the viewer into imagining a maze, and how its imagination becomes an idea. The Narrator then talks about Zhuang Zhou, a man who dreamt that he was a butterfly, to the point that he forgot about his real identity. He then compares an idea to an egg, where a rational idea hatches a chick while a delusion hatches a dark creature. He uses the example of Albert A, where he started thinking that his right leg didn't belong to him. As the delusion consumes him, he ends up sawing it off. The dark creature then eats the chick, with the Narrator noting that delusions grew stronger as rationality dies.

== Production ==
=== Development ===
In March 2018, it was reported that the first episode of the season would be titled "Chapter 9", and was to be directed by Tim Mielants and written by series creator Noah Hawley and co-executive producer Nathaniel Halpern. This was Hawley's fourth writing credit, Halpern's third writing credit, and Mielants' second directing credit.

== Reception ==
=== Viewers ===
In its original American broadcast, "Chapter 9" was seen by an estimated 0.669 million household viewers and gained a 0.3 ratings share among adults aged 18–49, according to Nielsen Media Research. This means that 0.3 percent of all households with televisions watched the episode. This was a 18% decrease in viewership from the previous episode, which was watched by 0.812 million viewers with a 0.4 in the 18-49 demographics.

With DVR factored in, the episode was watched by 1.50 million viewers with a 0.7 in the 18-49 demographics.

=== Critical reviews ===
"Chapter 9" received critical acclaim. The review aggregator website Rotten Tomatoes reported a 100% approval rating with an average rating of 8.2/10 for the episode, based on 16 reviews. The site's consensus states: "'Chapter 9' starts Legion's sophomore season with a deeper, more substantial arc while still retaining the show's splendid visuals and trippy narrative flourishes."

Ryan Matsunaga of IGN gave the episode an "amazing" 9.1 out of 10 and wrote in his verdict, "Viewers will likely spend most of 'Chapter 9' feeling more than a little confused, but that's arguably part of Legion's appeal at this point. A lot will depend on how well the rest of the season pays off the big mysteries set up here, but for now, it's looking like a hell of a ride."

Alex McLevy of The A.V. Club gave the episode an "A-" grade and wrote, "Legion's weird and wondrous universe is just as visually dazzling and elliptically enigmatic as ever."

Alan Sepinwall of Uproxx wrote, "A broad smile crosses [this critics'] face upon thinking about the animated tale of the man who dreamed he was a butterfly (or vice versa), and how that led into more disturbing explanations of how an innocuous thought can lead to madness." Evan Lewis of Entertainment Weekly wrote, "As season 2 progresses and it becomes clearer which mysteries are solvable and which are merely David's delusions, Hawley could invert all the soapy, pulpy clichés to deliver something awe-inspiring to an audience that thinks it knows what’s coming." Oliver Sava of Vulture gave the episode a 3 star rating out of 5 and wrote, "The stylistic flourishes give these character interactions deeper substance, and ideally Legion will maintain this dynamic as it moves forward." Ben Travers of IndieWire gave the episode an "A-" grade and wrote, "Hawley expertly controls the chaos to a point where finding our way out is a fun challenge, not an exhausting burden."

Nick Harley of Den of Geek gave the episode a 3.5 star rating out of 5 and wrote, "If Legion can keep an emotional throughline up amongst all of the topsy-turvy trippiness, it has potential to be one of the most memorable comic book adaptations ever attempted and proof of concept that these stories can continue to feel fresh. The show just needs to avoid getting too enamored with its own inventiveness but based on David's witty observations about the regular insanity that he encounters, there's a healthy amount of self-awareness in there somewhere. Hopefully that's one of the many voices in David and Noah Hawley's heads that they listen to." Josh Jackson of Paste gave the episode a 9 rating out of 10 and wrote, "It's work to follow the convoluted plots and it takes an openness to the most outré imaginings. But the rewards of this beautiful, original, clever, funny, well-written and well-acted show are, well, legion. I'm thankful for a new mystery and the myriad of WTF moments to come. Long live bat-shit crazy television."
