= Chapter 20 (Legion) =

- Legion episode
- Episode no.: Season 3 Episode 1
- Directed by: Andrew Stanton
- Written by: Noah Hawley; Nathaniel Halpern
- Cinematography by: Dana Gonzales
- Editing by: Curtis Thurber
- Production code: XLN03001
- Original air date: June 24, 2019
- Running time: 50 minutes

Guest appearance
- Vanessa Dubasso as Salmon

Episode chronology
| ← Previous "Chapter 19" | Next → "Chapter 21" |
- Legion season 3

"Chapter 20" is the first episode of the third season of the American surrealist superhero thriller television series Legion, based on the Marvel Comics character of the same name. It was written by series creator Noah Hawley and co-executive producer Nathaniel Halpern and directed by Andrew Stanton. It originally aired on FX on June 24, 2019.

The series follows David Haller, a "mutant" diagnosed with schizophrenia at a young age, as he tries to control his psychic powers and combat the sinister forces trying to control him. Eventually, he betrays his former friends at the government agency Division 3, who label him a threat and set off to hunt him down. In the episode, a young girl with the power of time travel joins a cult led by David and Lenny.

According to Nielsen Media Research, the episode was seen by an estimated 0.377 million household viewers and gained a 0.1 ratings share among adults aged 18–49. The episode received mostly positive reviews from critics, who praised the narrative, character development, performances and pacing.

== Plot ==
A young girl named Jia-yi lives a sophisticated life, all while listening to Mandarin lessons on time travel in her headphones. Throughout the day, she finds symbols that refer to time travel and "beware the basket". While investigating the symbols, she catches a radio signal from Lenny, inviting "them" to join them. She also hears the voice of David telling her to "follow the yellow bus".

As she walks in the street, she finds a red double-decker bus with yellow lights inside. She follows the bus, which leads her to a door in an alley. Inside the door, after passing a maze of clothing, eventually passes through a secret passageway and enters a hippie community. Her guide, Salmon, shows her the place, which turns out to be a cult that uses psychedelic drugs. One of the members, Squirrel, tells Jia-yi that her name will now be "Switch". She is then led to a room where the leader will come to visit her. Unwilling to wait, she reveals her mutant powers by accelerating time. Lenny enters the room to invite her, although she wants to talk with David.

Switch visits David, who has accepted his powers and is now more relaxed in nature. David was interested in finding a time traveler, planning to save his friends. Suddenly, Division 3 agents raid the compound, killing some of its members. Kerry arrives and chops off David's right arm, prompting David to evaporate her and some of the agents. Syd arrives and kills David by shooting him in the chest. In her shock, Switch escapes through a doorway, reversing time by one hour. Despite Switch's pleas, David stubbornly stays in the cult and fends off some of the agents, only to be distracted by the presence of Farouk and getting killed by Syd again.

Switch once again reverses time, now by two hours. However, she finds herself in the astral plane with Farouk, who is aware of her powers. He tells her about David's dangerous nature and offers her a chance to join them in catching him. Switch refuses and escapes through another doorway. Farouk then heads back to the Division 3 headquarters, which are now set in an aircraft. He informs Clark about David working with a time traveler, concluding that they must kill her too. During this, Cary creates an android version of Ptonomy, consisting of the mainframe.

As Division 3 prepares for the raid, Farouk informs Syd. Farouk tries to persuade her to not participate in the raid, but she refuses. Division 3 arrives at the compound, ready for another operation. However, a blast from the compound ruins the mission. As the team stares, they find that the compound has been teleported.

== Production ==
=== Development ===
In May 2019, it was reported that the first episode of the season would be titled "Chapter 20", and was to be directed by Andrew Stanton and written by series creator Noah Hawley and co-executive producer Nathaniel Halpern. This was Hawley's fifteenth writing credit, Halpern's eleventh writing credit, and Stanton's first directing credit.

=== Casting ===
In January 2019, it was announced that Lauren Tsai would join the series in the role of Switch, described as "a young mutant whose secret ability serves as the key to executing David Haller's plan."

== Reception ==
=== Viewers ===
In its original American broadcast, "Chapter 20" was seen by an estimated 0.377 million household viewers and gained a 0.1 ratings share among adults aged 18–49, according to Nielsen Media Research. This means that 0.1 percent of all households with televisions watched the episode. This was a 19% increase in viewership from the previous episode, which was watched by 0.315 million viewers with a 0.2 in the 18-49 demographics.

=== Critical reviews ===
"Chapter 20" received mostly positive reviews from critics. The review aggregator website Rotten Tomatoes reported a 100% approval rating with an average rating of 8.5/10 for the episode, based on 7 reviews.

Alicia Lutes of IGN gave the episode a "good" 7.3 out of 10 and wrote in her verdict, "Legion's third season premiere is as quirky and whimsical as you want it to be. Lauren Tsai, the latest addition to the cast, is fantastic in her first-ever acting role, and Rachel Keller and Aubrey Plaza still feel like the beating heart of the show. The acting continues to delight in its weird and wonderful nature (Navid Negahban needs to be a movie star). But as the series continues its inevitable roll towards villainy (with a chance of redemption) for David, the path towards a resolution feels hollow, often thanks to Hawley's overreliance on music to do the emotional heavy-lifting for him. What we're left with is something that feels more derivative — and less special — than the Legion we previously knew and loved. But hey, maybe they'll go back and do it all over again in the final two minutes, and we'll change our mind about everything we just watched."

Alex McLevy of The A.V. Club gave the episode a "B+" grade and wrote, "The smartest move that this first episode makes is to transfer the audience into the perspective of a brand-new character, essentially using Switch's mutant power to rescue the story, the series, and the characters from the dour fate it created."

Nick Harley of Den of Geek gave the episode a 4 star rating out of 5 and wrote, "Though Legion's whacky ways could be grating last year, the Season 3 premiere successfully splits the difference between psychedelic eye-candy and intriguing story developments. The episode is table-setting of the highest order, and it looks like the main course will be just as unconventional as we've come to expect." Kevin Lever of Tell Tale TV wrote, "Coupled with Switch and a strong visual command, the show is confident heading towards its end, Noah Hawley & Nathaniel Halpern's clever writing setting a stage of completely open possibilities."

=== Accolades ===
TVLine named Dan Stevens as an honorable mention for the "Performer of the Week" for the week of June 29, 2019, for his performance in the episode. The site wrote, "Legion's final season finds telekinetic mutant David Haller as the leader of a far-out hippie commune, and Dan Stevens was hilariously blissed out in this week's premiere as he welcomed time traveler Switch into his flock. Clad in flowing scarves and beaming with quiet serenity, this New Age-y David was a far cry from the frantic, tortured David we're used to seeing, and Stevens' laid-back delivery added a nice comedic punch, like when he calmly told Switch he tried trusting people, but 'it's better to read people's minds.' Stevens also showed off his action chops, storming through a couple of high-intensity fight scenes that set up the major battle ahead — but honestly, we'd be happy just sipping tea and listening to the Zen wisdom of the Magic Man."
