= Chapter 13 (Legion) =

- Legion episode
- Episode no.: Season 2 Episode 5
- Directed by: Tim Mielants
- Written by: Noah Hawley; Nathaniel Halpern
- Cinematography by: Dana Gonzales
- Editing by: Todd Desrosiers
- Production code: XLN02005
- Original air date: May 1, 2018
- Running time: 48 minutes

Guest appearance
- Katie Aselton as Amy Haller

Episode chronology
← Previous "Chapter 12"	Next → "Chapter 14"
- Legion season 2

"Chapter 13" is the fifth episode of the second season of the American surrealist superhero thriller television series Legion, based on the Marvel Comics character of the same name. It was written by series creator Noah Hawley and co-executive producer Nathaniel Halpern and directed by Tim Mielants. It originally aired on FX on May 1, 2018.

The series follows David Haller, a "mutant" diagnosed with schizophrenia at a young age. Struggling to differentiate reality from fantasy, he tries to control his mutant powers and combat the sinister forces trying to control him, eventually joining the government agency Division 3 to prevent his nemesis, Amahl Farouk, from finding his original body. In the episode, Division 3 questions a resurrected Lenny, who they suspect of working with Farouk.

According to Nielsen Media Research, the episode was seen by an estimated 0.456 million household viewers and gained a 0.2 ratings share among adults aged 18–49. The episode received mostly positive reviews from critics, who praised Plaza's performances, character development and twist ending, although the pacing received criticism.

== Plot ==
Clark questions Lenny, who denies being controlled by Farouk and wants to talk with David, as Farouk knows the location of his body. Somewhere, Farouk, possessing Oliver, locates a body, which is revealed to be a woman's body, from which he takes a tissue sample.

Ptonomy attempts to read Lenny's mind, but finds that her memories have been disrupted, and sees a vision of Admiral Fukyama. David decides to enter her mind, where he discovers that Farouk sent her. He blocks Farouk's influence over her, from which she states that she is unsure on how she could have a new body after she died, claiming that the new body belonged to someone else. Somewhere, Amy tells her husband that she had a dream where she had a mustache while serving a man with a basket over his head, referring to the Vermillion. She is then visited by Oliver, who claims will take her to David.

David then tells Lenny where they buried her body: the desert. Lenny then realizes that Farouk didn't find his body in the desert, he found hers. Farouk, in Oliver's body, located Amy in her hidden location by Division 3. He then killed her in order to infuse her body with Lenny's DNA, which caused the body to materialize as Lenny's. Lenny was returned to the desert, where after waking up, was sent by a horse to Division 3. A devastated David then cries in the arms of Lenny, saying that he is coming for Farouk.

In the episode, the Narrator explores the concept of pareidolia, from which humans can perceive their surroundings as different implications. It is through the perception and pattern recognition that a person could identify either an optimistic or pessimistic view, as well as a person viewing coincidences as "conspiracy".

== Production ==
=== Development ===
In April 2018, it was reported that the fifth episode of the season would be titled "Chapter 13", and was to be directed by Tim Mielants and written by series creator Noah Hawley and co-executive producer Nathaniel Halpern. This was Hawley's eighth writing credit, Halpern's seventh writing credit, and Mielants' third directing credit.

== Reception ==
=== Viewers ===
In its original American broadcast, "Chapter 13" was seen by an estimated 0.456 million household viewers and gained a 0.2 ratings share among adults aged 18–49, according to Nielsen Media Research. This means that 0.2 percent of all households with televisions watched the episode. This was a 5% increase in viewership from the previous episode, which was watched by 0.434 million viewers with a 0.2 in the 18-49 demographics.

=== Critical reviews ===
"Chapter 13" received mostly positive reviews from critics. The review aggregator website Rotten Tomatoes reported a 100% approval rating with an average rating of 7.2/10 for the episode, based on 9 reviews.

Alex McLevy of The A.V. Club gave the episode a "B+" grade and wrote, "The idea that our world is defined by what's missing as much as what's there helps illuminate Legion's theme of loss dictating identity."

Alan Sepinwall of Uproxx wrote, "'Chapter 13' as a whole really pushed the limits of how much the series' remarkable technical design can compensate for weaknesses in other storytelling areas." Evan Lewis of Entertainment Weekly wrote, "Another moderately-paced episode, 'Chapter 13' eschews last week's character development angle to instead build up to a thriller-esque reveal."

Oliver Sava of Vulture gave the episode a 3 star rating out of 5 and wrote, "There are scenes in this episode that have me second-guessing the reality of this season, and when everything is so unstable and malleable, it's hard to know what reality even means within the loose confines of this universe." Nick Harley of Den of Geek gave the episode a 4 star rating out of 5 and wrote, "There's plenty left in this episode to scratch your head at, like the fact that ol'basket head may be a giant chicken creature (?) or that Oliver plans on bringing down the Shadow King with something as simple as '1 +1.' The creature in Ptonomy's ear appears to finally start doing some damage too. Regardless, when you strip away all of the signature Legion-oddness, you're left with an episode absolutely anchored by a knockout Aubrey Plaza performance, and that's worth watching in any context."
