= Chapter 15 (Legion) =

- Legion episode
- Episode no.: Season 2 Episode 7
- Directed by: Charlie McDowell
- Written by: Noah Hawley; Nathaniel Halpern
- Cinematography by: Polly Morgan
- Editing by: Curtis Thurber
- Production code: XLN02006
- Original air date: May 15, 2018
- Running time: 48 minutes

Guest appearance
- Katie Aselton as Amy Haller

Episode chronology
← Previous "Chapter 14"	Next → "Chapter 16"
- Legion season 2

"Chapter 15" is the seventh episode of the second season of the American surrealist superhero thriller television series Legion, based on the Marvel Comics character of the same name. It was written by series creator Noah Hawley and co-executive producer Nathaniel Halpern and directed by Charlie McDowell. It originally aired on FX on May 15, 2018.

The series follows David Haller, a "mutant" diagnosed with schizophrenia at a young age, as he tries to control his psychic powers and combat the sinister forces trying to control him. Eventually, he joins the government agency Division 3 to prevent his nemesis, fellow psychic mutant Amahl Farouk, from finding his original body. In the episode, David confronts Farouk on Amy's death, prompting the latter to find out why he is helping him. Meanwhile, the team gets infected by delusions created by Farouk, leading an attack on Division 3.

According to Nielsen Media Research, the episode was seen by an estimated 0.451 million household viewers and gained a 0.2 ratings share among adults aged 18–49. The episode received generally positive reviews from critics, who praised the character development and performances, but criticized the pacing, lack of progress and rehashed concepts.

== Plot ==
David meets with Farouk, confronting him on Amy's death. Farouk insists that she was setting him back on his potential by admitting him into Clockworks. After feeling disturbed by a hallucination of Amy, David leaves the meeting.

Farouk then transports his mind to the future, to meet with Syd and find why David is helping him. Future Syd reveals that the apocalypse was caused by David himself, and hopes that Farouk can stop it. Farouk is delighted by the reveal and even suggests they could team up to save the world. Later, David also meets with Future Syd, explaining that he can't help Farouk since he was responsible for Amy's death. Syd says she understands, which culminates with a kiss.

Ptonomy is haunted by visions of Admiral Fukyama, a result of the delusions caused by the dark creature. This also leads him to inadvertently plant the delusions inside Clark, Syd, Cary, and Kerry. Everyone is now convinced that Fukyama is conspiring against them. This prompts them to lead an attack, incapacitating the Vermillion. Syd and Clark reach Fukyama, forcing him to take off his basket, revealing he is disfigured. As they project a dark creature inside their minds, Clark is about to kill him until David appears.

David removes the delusions from Syd and Clark. However, a larger delusion breaks free from Ptonomy's body, breaking his spine. The Vermillion save Ptonomy by taking him into the "mainframe", which makes up Fukyama's mind. David confronts the delusion, transporting both of them to a red room where David kills it.

At the beginning of the episode, the Narrator addresses moral panic, which showcases how rational fear could become irrational fear. Using as an example the witch trials in the early modern period, the Narrator wonders which one of either fear or frightened is more terrifying. After the events of the episode, the Narrator concludes that ideas can be contagious, which can lead to irrational fear.

== Production ==
=== Development ===
In April 2018, it was reported that the seventh episode of the season would be titled "Chapter 15", and was to be directed by Charlie McDowell and written by series creator Noah Hawley and co-executive producer Nathaniel Halpern. This was Hawley's tenth writing credit, Halpern's eighth writing credit, and McDowell's first directing credit.

== Reception ==
=== Viewers ===
In its original American broadcast, "Chapter 15" was seen by an estimated 0.451 million household viewers and gained a 0.2 ratings share among adults aged 18–49, according to Nielsen Media Research. This means that 0.2 percent of all households with televisions watched the episode. This was a 27% increase in viewership from the previous episode, which was watched by 0.353 million viewers with a 0.1 in the 18-49 demographics.

=== Critical reviews ===
"Chapter 15" received generally positive reviews from critics. The review aggregator website Rotten Tomatoes reported a 73% approval rating with an average rating of 6.7/10 for the episode, based on 11 reviews.

Alex McLevy of The A.V. Club gave the episode a "B+" grade and wrote, "Just as Legion itself plays coy with the nature of its reality, so too do its characters bob and feint between truth and fiction."

Alan Sepinwall of Uproxx wrote, "In terms of the larger arc of this season, insanity taking on a physical form and attacking David's friends wasn’t great timing. But in terms of the series bouncing back after a couple of off episodes, its timing was very welcome indeed." Evan Lewis of Entertainment Weekly wrote, "After three weeks of hit-or-miss diversions, 'Chapter 15' of Legion finds the season's lost plot, to the extent that anyone could, and gets things moving with some shifting alliances and long-gestating revelations."

Oliver Sava of Vulture gave the episode a 2 star rating out of 5 and wrote, "I've grown very tired of watching David and Farouk stare each other down in the astral plane, and changing the surroundings doesn't make these interactions any fresher." Nick Harley of Den of Geek gave the episode a 3 star rating out of 5 and wrote, "So though 'Chapter 15' makes some choices that are, ahem, insane, it still manages to be worthwhile by playing on David's strongest relationships: his relationship with the Shadow King and Syd, in the present and future. After so much stalling, I have to assume that the race will officially be on for Farouk's body next week, but it's looking like future Syd may present more harm to David's life at the moment than a newly physical Shadow King." Josh Jackson of Paste gave the episode a 8 rating out of 10 and wrote, "The A plot of Legion's second season develops so slowly, it's a good thing that everything surrounding it is so imaginative, visually interesting and wonderfully strange."
