= Chapter 10 (Legion) =

- Legion episode
- Episode no.: Season 2 Episode 2
- Directed by: Ana Lily Amirpour
- Written by: Noah Hawley; Nathaniel Halpern
- Cinematography by: Polly Morgan
- Editing by: Todd Desrosiers
- Production code: XLN02002
- Original air date: April 10, 2018
- Running time: 53 minutes

Episode chronology
← Previous "Chapter 9"	Next → "Chapter 11"
- Legion season 2

"Chapter 10" is the second episode of the second season of the American surrealist superhero thriller television series Legion, based on the Marvel Comics character of the same name. It was written by series creator Noah Hawley and co-executive producer Nathaniel Halpern and directed by Ana Lily Amirpour. It originally aired on FX on April 10, 2018.

The series follows David Haller, a "mutant" diagnosed with schizophrenia at a young age, as he tries to control his psychic powers and combat the sinister forces trying to control him. Eventually, he joins the government agency Division 3 to prevent his nemesis, fellow psychic mutant Amahl Farouk, from finding his original body. In the episode, David agrees to helping Farouk find his original body, although it still unleashes unfortunate events.

According to Nielsen Media Research, the episode was seen by an estimated 0.439 million household viewers and gained a 0.2 ratings share among adults aged 18–49. The episode received mostly positive reviews from critics, who praised the performances, character development, cinematography, and Amirpour's directing.

== Plot ==
Talking with Lenny and Oliver inside his mind, David informs Farouk that he will help him find his body as long as he doesn't hurt anyone.

At night, David leads some of his team into the desert to meet with Farouk inside Oliver's body. However, this is part of Farouk's plan, who infiltrates Division 3 with minimal security and kills many soldiers. He traps Cary in a room where he is haunted by Lenny, while he incapacitates Kerry. When the team returns, they find that Farouk trapped Cary inside Kerry's body. The team concludes that Farouk was looking for a monk member of the Mi-Go order, whom he believes is responsible for hiding his original body. Admiral Fukyama's bodyguards, the Vermillion, suspect that David may be responsible for leading Farouk into Division 3, which is rebuffed by Syd and Melanie.

Disturbed by the deaths, David asks Cary and Kerry for help in trying to meet with the future version of Syd again. Using the amplification chamber, David meets with Syd, who tells him that he will kill Farouk within a week, but then a plague will kill all the humans on the planet, which can be prevented if Farouk recovers his body. David then confronts Farouk in his original form, and both engage in a wrestling match, which evolves into a mind battle. Farouk then promises to stop killing, as long as David continues helping him in finding his body. David leaves the desert, while Lenny fails to convince Farouk from letting her go.

Cary manages to exit Kerry, although the process is not complete, with both noting that Kerry is now aging. David talks with Melanie, who tells him that he must "save himself". Based on this, David tells Syd about meeting her future self and working to help Farouk. Syd understands his position, and tells him they must do what the future Syd said by finding the monk. The monk is revealed to be in the room guarding people infected with the Catalyst, although he is not infected.

Throughout the episode, the Narrator explains the concept of umwelt, creatures' perception of the world. He also states how humans can change the meaning behind their ideas. As an example, a boy is taught by Oliver that "red" is green colored and "green" is red colored, with "green" symbolizing "go". As a result, the kid walks into a red light, causing him to get hit by a car.

== Production ==
=== Development ===
In March 2018, it was reported that the second episode of the season would be titled "Chapter 10", and was to be directed by Ana Lily Amirpour and written by series creator Noah Hawley and co-executive producer Nathaniel Halpern. This was Hawley's fifth writing credit, Halpern's fourth writing credit, and Amirpour's first directing credit.

=== Filming ===
The episode was Amirpour's first directorial credit for a scripted series. She was concerned that she would have to abandon her trademarks and style for the conventional television landscape, but Hawley assured her that she would keep her style. Amirpour said, "I want to make sure that I have Noah's back and the writers' backs and the show’s needs met. It was a true collaboration. The show is so psychedelic and non-linear that you just trust in each moment in a way."

The original opening scene involved David, Lenny and Oliver in an "infinity elevator", but it was changed as the production didn't have enough time to build the set. Amirpour then suggested using a carousel, deeming it "the perfect personification of going around and around in your mind and trying to look for answers."

== Reception ==
=== Viewers ===
In its original American broadcast, "Chapter 10" was seen by an estimated 0.439 million household viewers and gained a 0.2 ratings share among adults aged 18–49, according to Nielsen Media Research. This means that 0.2 percent of all households with televisions watched the episode. This was a 35% decrease in viewership from the previous episode, which was watched by 0.669 million viewers with a 0.3 in the 18-49 demographics.

With DVR factored in, the episode was watched by 1.03 million viewers with a 0.5 in the 18-49 demographics.

=== Critical reviews ===
"Chapter 10" received mostly positive reviews from critics. The review aggregator website Rotten Tomatoes reported a 100% approval rating with an average rating of 8.1/10 for the episode, based on 14 reviews.

Ryan Matsunaga of IGN gave the episode a "great" 8.5 out of 10 and wrote in his verdict, "Season 2 feels like it's slowing down a bit to set up some important elements, but there's still plenty for us to dig into and ponder in the meantime. With so many new ideas being introduced, we just have to hope that it will all come together in time for a satisfying conclusion."

Alex McLevy of The A.V. Club gave the episode a "B" grade and wrote, "The show is playing coy with these questions, which is fine: Especially after an episode so structured toward providing explanations and answers, keeping a few things in the dark isn't an issue."

Alan Sepinwall of Uproxx wrote, "Farouk can do anything, particularly in the mental realm and both fight scenes are a reminder of the threat he poses, which raises the question of just how dangerous the threat from Future Syd's timeline is, and how difficult it will be for even the combined forces of David and Farouk to stop it. But I bet however it goes down, it'll be very cool to watch." Evan Lewis of Entertainment Weekly wrote, "Legion is constantly juggling the competing impulses for exposition and counter-exposition. One episode will give the information necessary to bring the story into focus, and the next will introduce new elements to obfuscate the truth."

Oliver Sava of Vulture gave the episode a 4 star rating out of 5 and wrote, "Ana Lily Amirpour made a big impression with her feature film debut, A Girl Walks Home Alone at Night, and that film's bold visual sensibility and surreal subject matter make her a strong directorial fit for Legion." Nick Harley of Den of Geek gave the episode a 4.5 star rating out of 5 and wrote, "As long as this attention to character is continually shown, Legion has the potential to top last season, with Noah Hawley almost singly focused on dreaming up eye candy now that Fargo is on hiatus. With a cooperative Shadow King, the new dynamic could power Legion beyond its style over substance leanings, which would be truly the most mind-bending feat." Josh Jackson of Paste gave the episode a 9.5 rating out of 10 and wrote, "It only causes us to trust what we're watching even less. The plot seems almost straight forward at this point compared to Season One, but everything hinges on the word of future Syd. A show that has reveled in playing with reality is now playing with the concept of time. And there's no more playful show on TV right now."
