= Chapter 19 (Legion) =

- Legion episode
- Episode no.: Season 2 Episode 11
- Directed by: Keith Gordon
- Written by: Noah Hawley
- Cinematography by: Polly Morgan
- Editing by: Regis Kimble; Robin August
- Production code: XLN02010
- Original air date: June 12, 2018
- Running time: 52 minutes

Episode chronology
← Previous "Chapter 18"	Next → "Chapter 20"
- Legion season 2

"Chapter 19" is the eleventh episode and season finale of the second season of the American surrealist superhero thriller television series Legion, based on the Marvel Comics character of the same name. It was written by series creator Noah Hawley and directed by Keith Gordon. It originally aired on FX on June 12, 2018.

The series follows David Haller, a "mutant" diagnosed with schizophrenia at a young age, as he tries to control his psychic powers and combat the sinister forces trying to control him. Eventually, he joins the government agency Division 3 to prevent his nemesis, fellow psychic mutant Amahl Farouk, from finding his original body. In the episode, David finally has his battle against Farouk, all while Syd seeks to stop David from becoming evil.

According to Nielsen Media Research, the episode was seen by an estimated 0.315 million household viewers and gained a 0.1 ratings share among adults aged 18–49. The episode received mixed reviews from critics. Critics praised the performances, narrative and visual style. David's actions, however, drew polarized reactions; some found it bold with potential scenarios, while others derided it as character assassination.

== Plot ==
David and Farouk fight a psychic battle, where Farouk seems to overpower David. However, in the distance, Lenny uses the paintball weapon to hit the Choke, which emits a frequency that hits Farouk and David. The scene then is interrupted by a three-year time jump, with a glimpse of Oliver and Melanie, who now live in the ice cube, with both noting that Syd was betrayed by David.

Back to the present, and without their powers, David brutally attacks Farouk. As David is about to kill him, Syd arrives at the scene, having escaped from the underground. Syd confronts David on his perceived dark nature and how he seemed to enjoy killing many of his enemies. She then pulls out a gun and despite David's pleas, she shoots him. The scene then jumps to a dream sequence where David winds up in his childhood bedroom, with a Narrator explaining certain concepts on a television. An alternate version of David suggests that the delusion is that David believes himself to be a good person, claiming he isn't.

Returning to the desert, Syd's bullet is hit by Lenny's bullet, causing her to fall back and lose consciousness. David alters her memories, while Division 3 agents arrive at the scene to retrieve them, capturing Farouk by placing him a device to stop his powers. Lenny is also placed under custody, as she escaped from Division 3. The team returns to Division 3, where David and Syd remain committed in their relationship and both have sex, with David not revealing anything about the events nor her memories. Unknown to them, Admiral Fukyama watches them. Meanwhile, Cary creates a device that allows him to see the events at the desert, where he sees David changing Syd's memories.

David visits Farouk in his cell, who is awaiting execution. Farouk is aware of David manipulating Syd's memories, mocking him for his hypocrisy. After he leaves, Farouk's powers slightly manifest, and he restores Syd's memories. The next day, David arrives at Farouk's trial, but actually is part of a trap set by Division 3 and is caged in a force field, with even Farouk present. The Vermillion accuse him of his future crimes for the potential apocalypse he will cause, as well as the fact that David sexually assaulted Syd by erasing her memories and having sex with her. They want him to take treatment at a psychiatric hospital, or he will be killed.

As alternate versions of David mock him inside his mind, David proclaims that he is a good person and deserves love. Giving up on his attempts to convince them, David uses his powers to destroy the force field and vanish. He then appears in Lenny's cell, who happily joins him. As soldiers arrive, they vanish. When Syd asks Clark what should they do now, Clark states they must "pray".

== Production ==
=== Development ===
In May 2018, it was reported that the eleventh and final episode of the season would be titled "Chapter 19", and was to be directed by Keith Gordon and written by series creator Noah Hawley. This was Hawley's fourteenth writing credit, and Gordon's first directing credit. Originally, the season would end with its tenth episode. But in early May 2018, an additional episode was ordered. According to Hawley, part of the reason involved in avoiding an over-crowded season finale. The additional episode allowed the writers to spread more storylines throughout the previous episodes.

=== Writing ===
David turning into a villain was an idea that intrigued Noah Hawley, who always thought of the question "what would happen if Walter White was a supervillain?" Hawley wanted the series to evolve to the point that the audience would stop believing that David is the hero, and that Syd is the actual hero. He further added, "On the level that it's their story, I think she should always be front and center, and I think we went a long way this year towards expanding your understanding of her."

Regarding David's sexual assault on Syd, Hawley commented, "I mean, look, it's controversial. I don't know what the conversation will be, but I think it's worth having the conversation about consent and about the fact that there is no justification for acting without another person's consent. And, as she said, 'I'm the hero and you're just another villain' On some level, that's the story of the show. The question is, is there any redemption for him coming out of that? And where do we go next?"

== Reception ==
=== Viewers ===
In its original American broadcast, "Chapter 19" was seen by an estimated 0.315 million household viewers and gained a 0.1 ratings share among adults aged 18–49, according to Nielsen Media Research. This means that 0.1 percent of all households with televisions watched the episode. This was a 33% decrease in viewership from the previous episode, which was watched by 0.467 million viewers with a 0.2 in the 18-49 demographics.

=== Critical reviews ===
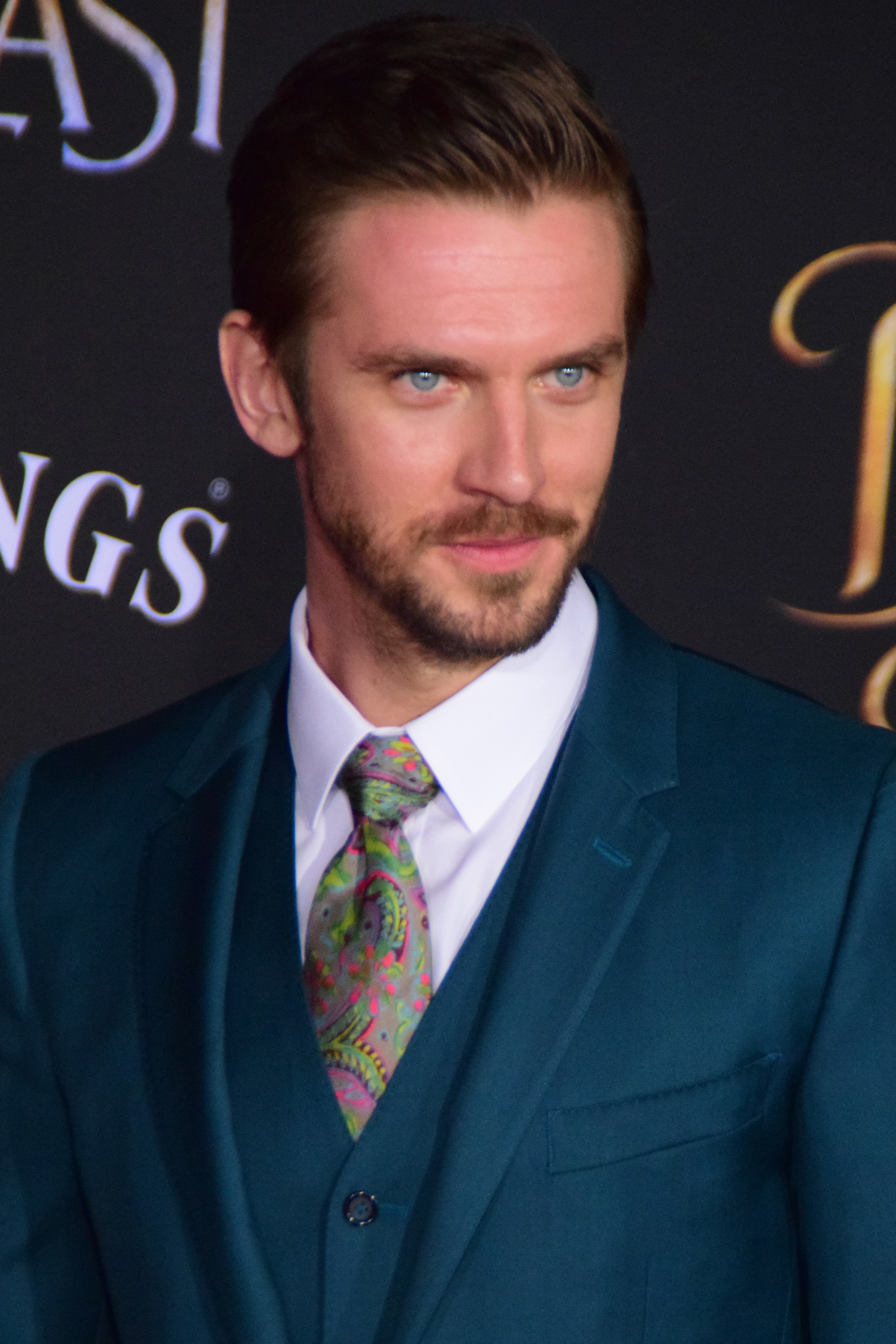
Dan Stevens received praise for his performance in the episode, although his character's actions received polarizing reactions.

"Chapter 19" received mixed reviews from critics. The review aggregator website Rotten Tomatoes reported a 57% approval rating with an average rating of 7.1/10 for the episode, based on 14 reviews. The site's consensus states: "'Chapter 19' defies expectations for Legion's complicated characters, although the series' ability to continue weaving the web it's spun seems uncertain."

Ryan Matsunaga of IGN gave the episode an "amazing" 9.4 out of 10 and wrote in his verdict, "If the first season of Legion was the story of a hero coming into his powers, the second turned out to be a compelling look at a villain discovering his destiny. While little in the way of closure is provided, the finale does give us some of the show's best scenes to date, and a remarkable new direction for the next season."

Oliver Sava of Vulture gave the episode a 3 star rating out of 5 and wrote, "I applaud Legion's willingness to commit to this heel turn for David." Nick Harley of Den of Geek gave the episode a 4.5 star rating out of 5 and wrote, "The fracturing of David and Syd and the deterioration of David's mental state, his warped view of his relationship, easily made this the most gripping episode of the season. Though many parts of Season 2 didn't coalesce into a coherent whole, this aspect of the season was allowed to build until it reached its heart-wrenching conclusion. Legion will be back for Season 3 and David will more closely resemble his traditional villainous comic book counterpart, a new status quo could do this show wonders. It felt like Legion had lost its ability to surprise me, but 'Chapter 19' had me pleasantly shocked that David actually turned. Hopefully there's little looking back."

Other reviews were more negative. Alex McLevy of The A.V. Club gave the episode a "C" grade and wrote, "This is upsetting, disturbing stuff, and for the first time since I began watching this weird and often wonderful show, I'm not convinced Legion is capable of telling the story it just waded into. To understand why is to pull at the messy threads of narrative convention. I spoke at length in last week's review about what has made this such a polarizing season of television. Legion has been shedding viewers, and I think it has a lot to do with the willfully alienating nature of the story. It became positively Brechtian in its refusal to allow the audience a point of identification, or a way to trust the show. Not just in the sense that we couldn't necessarily trust our own eyes, but in not providing us with protagonists in whom we can believe. We can't trust David, we can't really trust anyone, not with delusion creatures roaming free."

Alan Sepinwall of Rolling Stone wrote, "The climax isn't an exact unintentional metaphor for Legion Season Two itself – but it's close. The series isn't evil so much as it is fairly drunk on its own creative powers, where trying to be even slightly easier and cleaner might do it and its audience a world of good." Ben Travers of IndieWire gave the episode a "B" grade but criticized David's actions, writing, "It involves the very concept Noah Hawley is putting under the microscope: how audiences can be so ready to identify with a hero, they're willing to root for him when he stops doing good. Though that idea is one worthy of exploring, the execution lurched from scene to scene as David's transformation from Dr. Jekyll to Mr. Hyde never smoothed out."

Darren Franich of Entertainment Weekly gave the episode a "B-" grade and wrote, "Predictably, everyone who went to the desert wound up getting lost — or, in a sight gag that really emphasized the 'gag', getting pulled around on a rickshaw. And, at one point the finale, after finally shooting her sniper rifle, Lenny smoked a cloud of something smoky out of a golden alligator pipe. Appropriate: This show got very high on its own supply." Beth Elderkin of Gizmodo wrote, "That sums up the second season in a nutshell, a lot of style relishing in its own unearned brilliance. And while the season finale was both stylistically and narratively great, even brilliant at times, it also did something unforgivable." Emily St. James of Vox wrote, "Legion's season two finale had the worst of both worlds. Its long-planned reveal, staged as a twist, was so heavily foreshadowed that it was easy to predict, but it also happened so perfunctorily that it felt like the show had thrown it together at the last minute."

=== Accolades ===
TVLine named Dan Stevens as the "Performer of the Week" for the week of June 16, 2018, for his performance in the episode. The site wrote, "As the star of FX's trippy superhero drama, Stevens has raised the bar for all comic-book TV performances, with his troubled mutant David Haller struggling to harness his formidable powers while battling a devastating mental illness. This week's Season 2 finale found David at the very height of his powers — and Stevens, too, as David realized his best move might be to embrace his dark side."
