= Chapter 16 (Legion) =

- Legion episode
- Episode no.: Season 2 Episode 8
- Directed by: Jeremy Webb
- Written by: Noah Hawley; Jordan Crair
- Cinematography by: Polly Morgan
- Editing by: Todd Desrosiers; Brian Beal
- Production code: XLN02008
- Original air date: May 22, 2018
- Running time: 48 minutes

Guest appearance
- David Selby as Brubaker

Episode chronology
| ← Previous "Chapter 15" | Next → "Chapter 17" |
- Legion season 2

"Chapter 16" is the eighth episode of the second season of the American surrealist superhero thriller television series Legion, based on the Marvel Comics character of the same name. It was written by series creator Noah Hawley and Jordan Crair and directed by Jeremy Webb. It originally aired on FX on May 22, 2018.

The series follows David Haller, a "mutant" diagnosed with schizophrenia at a young age, as he tries to control his psychic powers and combat the sinister forces trying to control him. Eventually, he joins the government agency Division 3 to prevent his nemesis, fellow psychic mutant Amahl Farouk, from finding his original body. In the episode, David discovers the location of Farouk's body and hurries to find it, although he is one day behind Farouk.

According to Nielsen Media Research, the episode was seen by an estimated 0.409 million household viewers and gained a 0.2 ratings share among adults aged 18–49. The episode received positive reviews from critics, who praised the cinematography, visual style and character development, although the pacing and lack of progress received criticism.

== Plot ==
Inside the Mainframe, Ptonomy is shown Fukyama's past. When he was a teenager, he was contacted by Division 3 in acting as a keeper from secrets, with his brain surgery serving as some sort of machine that would prevent telepaths from reading minds and discovering vital information.

Hacking into the Mainframe, Ptonomy contacts David through a Vermillion, saying that he has found the location of Farouk's body in a desert known as "Le Désolé". David leaves for the desert without informing Division 3, but tells Lenny about his intentions. After he leaves, he has Lenny released from her cell and she leaves on a motorcycle. Farouk is also pursuing the location, following advice from his old caretaker. Guided by Clark, Syd leaves for the desert as well.

The desert turns out to be a constantly changing location where time and logic do not apply, with Farouk one day ahead of David. Syd catches up with David, but both struggle passing a storm in the desert. They find a tent with their future skeleton selves. David says he has a plan and telepathically communicates with Clark, telling him to find "the clock". However, Clark is knocked unconscious by Melanie, revealing that she is under Farouk's control. Back in the desert, Farouk summons a minotaur to help with his mission.

In the middle of the episode, the Narrator talks about narcissism and the idea that people don't matter, which could be the most alarming delusion in existence. He views it as people struggling with seeing the real world outside their "shadow", noting that if everyone lived in a cave, nothing would be real.

== Production ==
=== Development ===
In May 2018, it was reported that the eighth episode of the season would be titled "Chapter 16", and was to be directed by Jeremy Webb and written by series creator Noah Hawley and Jordan Crair. This was Hawley's eleventh writing credit, Crair's first writing credit, and Webb's first directing credit.

== Reception ==
=== Viewers ===
In its original American broadcast, "Chapter 16" was seen by an estimated 0.409 million household viewers and gained a 0.2 ratings share among adults aged 18–49, according to Nielsen Media Research. This means that 0.2 percent of all households with televisions watched the episode. This was a 10% decrease in viewership from the previous episode, which was watched by 0.451 million viewers with a 0.2 in the 18-49 demographics.

With DVR factored in, the episode was watched by 0.80 million viewers with a 0.4 in the 18-49 demographics.

=== Critical reviews ===
"Chapter 16" received positive reviews from critics. The review aggregator website Rotten Tomatoes reported a 100% approval rating with an average rating of 7.4/10 for the episode, based on 9 reviews.

Alex McLevy of The A.V. Club gave the episode a "B" grade and wrote, "The show is kicking into high gear, and it's unspooling in a bracingly engaging and effective manner. Well, except for those damn lessons."

Alan Sepinwall of Uproxx wrote, "'Chapter 16' is a weird episode even by Legion standards. Or maybe it's jut weird in a different way from how Legion is usually weird. No matter how bizarre, or how good, an episode is, it tends to feel all of a piece, where 'Chapter 16' feels more like a bunch of ideas Noah Hawley and company had that wound up in the same hour because there was no other good place to put them." Evan Lewis of Entertainment Weekly wrote, "'Chapter 16', like Legion in general, doesn't quite stick every landing in terms of tone, but it's a routine with so many tricks at such a high degree of difficulty that it's easy to overlook a little sidestep here and there."

Oliver Sava of Vulture gave the episode a 3 star rating out of 5 and wrote, "Can Legion hurry up and find Farouk's body already?" Nick Harley of Den of Geek gave the episode a 4 star rating out of 5 and wrote, "'Chapter 16' is successful because of all of these character developments, but it's as always bolstered by Legion's impeccable sense of style. Those dissected frames, pushing each other in and out are immediately alluring, as are the vast desert shots of Farouk and Oliver raising toward the body and the binary-obscured view from inside the mainframe. Legion has been more uneven than its first season, but when its working, it's still the most arresting show on television."
