= Legion season 2 =

Season of television series

Legion
- Season 2
- Promotional poster
- Showrunner: Noah Hawley
- Starring: Dan Stevens; Rachel Keller; Aubrey Plaza; Bill Irwin; Navid Negahban; Jemaine Clement; Jeremie Harris; Amber Midthunder; Hamish Linklater; Jean Smart
- No. of episodes: 11

Release
- Original network: FX
- Original release: April 3 – June 12, 2018

Season chronology
- ← Previous; Season 1 Next → Season 3

The second season of the American surrealist superhero thriller television series Legion premiered in Los Angeles on April 2, 2019, ahead of airing on FX from April 3 to June 12, totaling eleven episodes. The series is based on the Marvel Comics character David Haller, a mutant diagnosed with schizophrenia at a young age, who learns that his illness may actually be powerful psychic abilities. In the season, David and his friends join a government agency to find and stop the parasitic Shadow King before he finds his original body after being forced out of David's mind in the previous season. It was produced by FX Productions in association with Marvel Television, with Noah Hawley serving as showrunner.

Dan Stevens stars as David, with Rachel Keller, Aubrey Plaza, Bill Irwin, Jeremie Harris, Amber Midthunder and Jean Smart also returning from the first season to star. They are joined by Jemaine Clement and Hamish Linklater, promoted from guest roles in the first season, and Navid Negahban. The second season was ordered by FX in March 2017, with filming for the season relocating from Vancouver to California, to take advantage of tax incentives. Production began in September 2017, with practical effects again a priority for the series' crew.

The season received positive reviews from critics, who praised its performances, visual style, exploration of certain themes, and ambition, though some criticized it as prioritizing style over substance, and the finale garnered a polarized response. On June 1, Legion was renewed for a third and final season.

== Episodes ==
No. overall	No. in season	Title	Directed by	Written by	Original release date	Prod. code	U.S. viewers (millions)
9	1	"Chapter 9"	Tim Mielants	Noah Hawley & Nathaniel Halpern	April 3, 2018	XLN02001	0.669
A year after Amahl Farouk / Shadow King escaped in the body of Oliver Bird and David Haller was kidnapped by a strange orb, the mutants of Summerland and the government agency Division 3 race against Farouk to find his original body, which would allow him to unleash his full power. Farouk is also infecting people with a psychic "virus", the Catalyst, that paralyses their bodies but causes their teeth to continuously chatter. David appears in a nightclub, claiming that only hours have passed since his kidnapping, while also secretly hearing alternate versions of himself communicating with him. He tries to find Farouk telepathically, using an amplification chamber created by scientist Cary Loudermilk to increase the range of his abilities, but instead relives a memory from the nightclub of a strange monk and a dance battle with Oliver and Lenny Busker. David gives his girlfriend Syd Barrett a compass that will always lead her to him, and promises not to keep secrets from her, but does not tell her of the future version of her that sent the orb and told him to help Farouk find his body. That night, David's mind meets with Oliver and Lenny in the "nightclub". The Narrator explains how ideas lead to madness and delusions, and recounts the story of Zhuang Zhou. He compares ideas to eggs—a rational idea hatches as a healthy chick and a delusion is a dark creature that feeds on it—and gives the example of Albert A, a man who cannot ignore the idea that his own leg is not his, to the point that he saws it off.
10	2	"Chapter 10"	Ana Lily Amirpour	Noah Hawley & Nathaniel Halpern	April 10, 2018	XLN02002	0.439
David agrees to work with Farouk, and causes a distraction by taking many of the others to the desert while Farouk takes Oliver's body to Division 3, where he believes the last surviving monk of the Migo Order may be hiding—the Migo monks had played a role in hiding Farouk's body. Farouk does not find the monk, but does kill several soldiers and traps Cary Loudermilk within the body of Kerry, the girl who is usually within his body. Members of Division 3 begin to suspect David is working against them. He regrets helping Farouk now that it caused loss of life, and convinces the Loudermilks to further enhance his abilities to try and contact Syd in the future. There she explains that David will kill Farouk within a week, but then a plague will kill all the humans on the planet and Farouk could have helped them stop it. Returning to the present, David confronts Farouk who agrees to no longer kill people in exchange for David's continued cooperation. David tells Syd what he is doing, and she agrees that they should do as her future self says. The Narrator discusses umwelt, one creature's perception of the world. He explains that humans are the only creatures that apply meaning to the world, and so are the only creatures who go mad. For instance, a boy taught that the color red is called "green" and that "green means go" may attempt to cross a road when shown a red light.
11	3	"Chapter 11"	Sarah Adina Smith	Noah Hawley & Nathaniel Halpern	April 17, 2018	XLN02003	0.380
David and those at Division 3 realize that the Monk was in a room with victims of the Catalyst, and has now escaped. David confers with Farouk, who explains that the Monk is the actual source of the Catalyst, as an asymptomatic carrier. Meanwhile, the Monk has infected everyone else except for Cary. David and Cary enter the minds of Ptonomy Wallace and Melanie Bird, finding them trapped in mazes based on their deepest desires; David is able to free them. He is captured by the Monk, who shares memories of Farouk's body being buried beneath the Migo monastery and slowly driving the other Monks mad, until they committed suicide or were infected by the Catalyst. The Monk incapacitates Admiral Fukyama, Division 3's leader, and reveals that he is searching for a weapon to defeat Farouk. Melanie believes this is David, who the Monk almost reveals has been working with Farouk. David teleports the Monk to the roof of the building and attempts to explain himself, but the Monk jumps from the building, choosing suicide over helping Farouk. The Narrator introduces the nocebo effect, calling it a conversion disorder where the body responds to the idea of an illness as a real illness. He further describes how this issue can be contagious, linking it to mass hysteria and citing the dancing plague of 1518, the Tanganyika laughter epidemic, and the Hindu milk miracle as examples.
12	4	"Chapter 12"	Ellen Kuras	Noah Hawley & Nathaniel Halpern	April 24, 2018	XLN02004	0.434
The Catalyst disappears, and David enters Syd's mind. Finding another maze, David explores Syd's mind, following her life's story from birth through adolescence: even as a baby Syd did not like to be touched, and she was bullied for this growing up, leading to self-harm. She first gained her abilities as a teenager when a boy insisted on kissing her, and used this first experience of body-swapping to attack bullies. Syd eventually took her mother's body and had sex with her partner, but accidentally changed back to her teenage body before they finished, leading to his arrest. After living through Syd's life David explained to her what he believed was her one true desire, but each time she would say that he is wrong and make him start watching again. He eventually realizes that this is not a Catalyst maze, and that Syd is testing him herself. When David is unable to guess her meaning, Syd explains that she believes love will not save them but pain can give them the strength to fight for love, and allows them to wake up.
13	5	"Chapter 13"	Tim Mielants	Noah Hawley & Nathaniel Halpern	May 1, 2018	XLN02005	0.456
After pleading with Farouk to release her, Lenny appears at Division 3 with an apparent physical body. She surrenders herself, and is interrogated about whether she is still being controlled by Farouk (she denies this) and how she came to have a body again after hers died (she refuses to explain this). Ptonomy attempts to look through her memories but finds them disturbed, and is forced to face a strange delusion within his own mind involving Admiral Fukyama. When David looks into Lenny's mind, he realizes that she has indeed been sent by Farouk, but manages to block out that influence so the two can talk openly. Lenny states that she is unsure how she can have a body again, but together they piece together the memories in her head: Farouk directed Oliver to dig up Lenny's original body and take a tissue sample from it, and then they found David's sister Amy where Division 3 was hiding her. Oliver used a device that he stole from Division 3 to infuse Amy's body with Lenny's DNA. Farouk then planted Lenny's consciousness in this body. The Narrator discusses examples of the phenomenon pareidolia, and highlights the power of human perception and pattern recognition—in a further example, he contrasts an optimist and a pessimist responding to a situation. He states that it is this that causes humans to conflate coincidence with conspiracy.
14	6	"Chapter 14"	John Cameron	Noah Hawley	May 8, 2018	XLN02007	0.353
David's mind explores possible lives where he made different choices. In one life he is homeless and attacked by a group of men. This unlocks David's abilities and he is hunted by Division 3. Kerry Loudermilk kills him. In another life, David takes medication to suppress his abilities and lives a docile life with Amy, until a vision of the Devil with Yellow Eyes and a confrontation with police officers leads to David being shot and killed. One life sees David working for a businesswoman until he uses his mind reading ability to gain her favor. This version remains under the control of Farouk and eventually becomes the richest man in the world, with the businesswoman now working for him. In other lives a drug-addicted version of David discusses the multiverse theory, an elderly David is cared for by Amy, and a happy David lives a pleasant suburban life. Remembering when Amy first took him to Clockworks Psychiatric Hospital and accepted that they had to live with the life they got, David returns to his life and accepts the version of events that led to her death.
15	7	"Chapter 15"	Charlie McDowell	Noah Hawley & Nathaniel Halpern	May 15, 2018	XLN02006	0.451
David vows revenge against Farouk for Amy's death. Trying to understand why David had helped him in the first place, Farouk sends his mind forward in time to meet with the future Syd and ask her why she had tasked David with helping him. She explains that David will cause her apocalyptic future, and she hopes that Farouk can help prevent this from happening. David also visits future Syd, claiming that he is now unable to help Farouk due to Amy's death despite what future Syd says. Ptonomy's mind continues to be haunted by the delusion, seemingly planted by Farouk as a distraction, that Admiral Fukyama is secretly working against them. Ptonomy plants this fear in the minds of Syd, the Loudermilks, and agent Clark Debussy, and they attack the android Vermillion who serve Fukyama. Clark almost murders the Admiral before David stops them and removes the delusions from their minds. This process is fatal for Ptonomy, but the Vermillion manage to save his mind by adding it to the "mainframe" that makes up Fukyama's mind. The Narrator talks about moral panic in relation to the events of the episode, and recaps all of his lessons so far by noting how his discussions of delusions and mass hysteria play out onscreen. The delusions that take hold of the character's minds in the episode are depicted as the dark creature the Narrator introduced in the first episode of the season.
16	8	"Chapter 16"	Jeremy Webb	Noah Hawley & Jordan Crair	May 22, 2018	XLN02008	0.409
Future Syd told Farouk how he could find the driver who took his body to the Mi-Go monks. The now-elderly driver agrees to tell Farouk where his body is in exchange for him placing her mind in a never-ending dream. In the Mainframe, Ptonomy sees how Fukyama was recruited as a teenager to become this machine so that Division 3 could hide secrets in his "mind" from mutant telepaths. He also finds that the monk uploaded some of his memories to the Mainframe, including the location of Farouk's body; it is in Le Désolé, a constantly changing desert. Ptonomy is able to get this information to David through the Vermillion. Putting a plan in motion, David goes to the desert to start looking, with Farouk only a day ahead of him. Syd follows David, and the pair end up trapped by a storm in a tent with the apparent skeletons of their future selves. As part of his plan, David remotely releases Lenny from her cell and telepathically tells Clark to bring the "Choke" to the desert. However, Melanie attacks and restrains Clark first. The Narrator discusses narcissism and the "most alarming delusion of all": believing other people do not matter. He states that this arises from people seeing a "shadow" of the world rather than the real thing, such as by interacting with others through technology, and are unable to compare themselves to the perceived shadow people.
17	9	"Chapter 17"	Noah Hawley	Noah Hawley & Nathaniel Halpern	May 29, 2018	XLN02011	0.362
Two weeks earlier, when David first returned to Division 3, Melanie was falling into despair at the loss of Oliver again after he was trapped in the astral plane for 21 years. She became addicted to drugs, hallucinating a minotaur. Oliver began to visit Melanie in her mind, reminding her of their time together and encouraging her to forget about the animosity she feels towards him for always leaving. She starts helping Oliver, desperate to be with him again, first warning him of David's plan and then attacking Clark to try to stop it. The Loudermilks receive a message from David, instructing them to steal a weapon from Division 3 and deliver it to the parking lot at the Blue Octopus. Meanwhile, Lenny returns to her former life after years in a mental hospital or enslaved by Farouk. She turns back to drugs and partying, but is haunted by Amy who convinces her to help David by following his plan. Lenny retrieves the weapon from the Blue Octopus, and is teleported to the desert. With a tracking device on the weapon, the Loudermilks follow.
18	10	"Chapter 18"	Dana Gonzales	Noah Hawley & Nathaniel Halpern	June 5, 2018	XLN02009	0.467
Syd wakes up after a night in the tent to find a giant plughole in the desert ground. She is dragged down the "drain" to find Melanie. David wakes up and finds the Mi-Go monastery. Inside, he finds Oliver and tortures him, but Farouk refuses to reveal where Syd is. Melanie and Syd watch this from underground, where the latter maintains that David is a good person. Melanie attempts to convince her otherwise, telling Syd about secrets David kept such as the intimate relationship he had with Future Syd as well as the fact that David will be the one to end the world. Melanie knows this because she is being controlled by Farouk, who abandons Oliver's body during the torture. The Loudermilks arrive and go down the drain, while Lenny waits above ground. Farouk is reunited with his body, and sends the minotaur to kill the others. He finds Clark and Division 3, arriving later than David had wanted to, and throws away the Choke—a tuning fork that can dampen mutant powers. Farouk then basks in his regained power.
19	11	"Chapter 19"	Keith Gordon	Noah Hawley	June 12, 2018	XLN02010	0.315
David and Farouk mentally battle one another until Lenny finds and activates the Choke. David physically overpowers Farouk, before Syd arrives having escaped from underground when Kerry killed the minotaur. Syd explains what she has learned about David and shoots him, but the bullet is stopped by one from Lenny. David alters Syd's memories so she still loves him. Though Syd is confused, David convinces her that there is nothing wrong and the pair have sex. This is witnessed by Fukyama. Division 3 arrests Farouk and Lenny, while an imprisoned Farouk grimly admonishes David over his actions and his true nature before secretly restoring Syd's memories. Cary uses data from the desert to virtually reconstruct the events, and sees David changing Syd's mind. When David arrives for Farouk's trial, he is trapped by the others. David insists that he is good and should not be punished for potential future actions, but they make him face the fact that he sexually assaulted Syd. Hallucinating his alters in the room, David suddenly becomes fed up with the actions of his former allies, before he destroys and escapes the trap and teleports away with Lenny. Three years later, Melanie and Oliver are living happily together in the astral plane. The educational segment from the first episode of the season is revisited, with the Narrator's story about the delusion hatching from the egg playing in David's mind after Syd shoots at him. An alternate version of David suggests that the idea of David being a good person who deserves love is itself a delusion.

== Cast and characters ==
=== Main ===
- Dan Stevens as David Haller
- Rachel Keller as Sydney "Syd" Barrett
- Aubrey Plaza as Lenny Busker
- Bill Irwin as Cary Loudermilk
- Navid Negahban as Amahl Farouk / Shadow King
- Jemaine Clement as Oliver Bird
- Jeremie Harris as Ptonomy Wallace
- Amber Midthunder as Kerry Loudermilk
- Hamish Linklater as Clark Debussy
- Jean Smart as Melanie Bird

=== Recurring ===
- David Selby as Brubaker
- Katie Aselton as Amy Haller

=== Guests ===
- Lily Rabe as Joan Barrett
- Molly Hagan as Laura Mercer
- Seamus Dever as Don Eichman

== Production ==
=== Development ===
In June 2016, FX President John Landgraf said that Legion, if successful, could run for as many seasons as Hawley feels it needs to tell the story. In January 2017, Hawley said he was open to continuing the story past the first season, but didn't want the audience to get to the end of the first run and have "no resolution of any kind at the end of it." Star Dan Stevens said, "I know for a fact that there are more issues that David has to deal with than the one that we really address in the first season." FX renewed Legion for a second season on March 15, 2017. At the end of that month, Hawley explained that he planned for the season to have ten episodes, and to focus more on the series' other characters in addition to David Haller. He added, "I do tend to think that that's important, that even though the show isn't an anthology like Fargo, each season has a self-contained-ness to it, an identity to it. But I think it's a little too early to talk about what that identity might be." The season order was later expanded to eleven episodes, as announced by FX in May.

=== Writing ===
Hawley noted that the first season was about Haller's internal struggle against the Shadow King, and that the latter's transference to the character Oliver Bird at the end of the season signified a change to an external struggle for Haller that this season would explore. Hawley wanted to avoid having a villain-of-the-year structure, with the second season introducing a new antagonist, instead wanting to continue the story surrounding the Shadow King from his introduction in the first season that "makes for a potential showdown that we're really invested in as an audience". Hawley added that with the Shadow King reveal at the end of the first season, Haller can now blame "every bad thing he's ever done on the entity that's now gone, and now is thinking, 'I'm just a purely good person'... there's sort of a hubris to that." Stevens said that "we haven't even really scratched the surface of the number of characters or entities that are contained within [Haller]. The Shadow King was obviously one of them, and a large part, but there's a lot more going on." Hawley did not have a plan for the second season when he ended the first on a cliffhanger, and enjoyed the challenge of developing the story from that point, noting that this was the first "true" second season he has created. Hawley did not have to repeat this at the end of the second season, as he had a plan for future seasons by that point.

The second season begins a year after the end of the first, with Hawley feeling the time jump allowed them to "muddy the waters" rather than be "all clarity all the time", since "that's the fun of the show, the mystery of trying to figure things out." Stevens added that "everybody's going to be playing catchup", including the audience and Haller. Hawley also said that the season would explore the world of heroes and villains, and that it was not yet decided which direction Haller would go. The season spends more time inside the minds of the characters and in the Astral Plane than the first, and also explores "more specific genres and storytelling moments" to both be more ambitious than the first season and not repeat what had been done before; Hawley wanted to "use the genre to solve the characters ... to explore the characters and stories that you couldn't in a straight drama". The main story of the season focuses on Farouk searching for his original body, since mutant abilities are genetic and being reunited with the body will make him even more powerful. The season includes some episodes that Hawley considered "more stand-alone", that are still relevant to the plot of the season but were less interested in the plot and more character-focused. This was something Hawley had not been comfortable doing during the first season due to introducing the "different than everything else"-series to audiences then.

To avoid the season becoming "a good versus evil or white hat versus black hat situation", Hawley wanted to focus on thematic ideas such as "our shared reality being a choice that we make. Sometimes societies go a little bit crazy. How does that happen?" To help explore that idea, Hawley created an "educational segment" which he soon decided to add to each episode of the season. The segments are narrated, and are intended to "take these concepts of mental illness, and visualizing them in a way where you can tell a story."

=== Casting ===
Returning from the first season to star are Stevens as David Haller, Rachel Keller as Sydney "Syd" Barrett, Aubrey Plaza as Lenny Busker, Bill Irwin as Cary Loudermilk, Jeremie Harris as Ptonomy Wallace, Amber Midthunder as Kerry Loudermilk, and Jean Smart as Melanie Bird. Hawley considered Barrett to be the co-protagonist of the season alongside Haller, calling it a "two-hander", with the season further exploring their relationship and comparing it to that of Melanie Bird and her husband Oliver. Hamish Linklater joins the main cast, having portrayed Clark Debussy in a guest role in the first season.

With the end of the first season establishing the importance of Jemaine Clement's character Oliver Bird, now the host of the villainous Shadow King, Hawley said that he had talked to the actor about the next season, and that he was "excited to come back". Clement's return was confirmed in July 2017, also being promoted to the main cast, along with the announcement that Saïd Taghmaoui had been cast as the true form of the Shadow King / Amahl Farouk, succeeding Plaza who played the character using the appearance and persona of Busker in the first season. In November, during production on the season, Taghmaoui announced that he was no longer involved with the series, and FX confirmed that "a decision was made to recast" the role of Farouk. Navid Negahban was revealed to have taken over the role in January 2018. Hawley explained that Taghmaoui had not been "a great fit", leading to the recast. Negahban joins the main cast as well.

Jon Hamm narrates the educational segments throughout the season. Hawley did not want the narration to feel "tainted" by having one of the series' characters give their own point of view, and wanted an actor who could give "a sense of identity and a feeling of control [as if] the show itself has a point of view and it's all going somewhere". He compared the voice that he wanted for the narration to Alec Baldwin's from the film The Royal Tenenbaums, and considered Hamm—who he thought had "a great voice"—after working with him on the film Pale Blue Dot. Hamm agreed to take on the role, and Hawley thought he gave the segments "such character", comparing the final performance to Rod Serling. Hawley added that he was "pretty confident" the actor would only be providing his voice to the series rather than ever appearing onscreen.

Quinton Boisclair was confirmed to be returning as the Devil with the Yellow Eyes in July 2017. Katie Aselton also returns from the first season in a recurring role as David's sister Amy, before her body is infused with Busker's DNA allowing that character to return to life.

=== Design ===
New costume designer Robert Blackman continued the theme of mixing 60s and modern-day fashion. While each character's outfits were updated, the color palette for each character mainly stayed the same: Barrett wears orange and black in addition to yellow (with Keller saying black represents her character's "protective barrier"); and both Cary and Kerry Loudermilk wear navy and tan. Notable changes include: Melanie Bird's style changing to comfort clothing to portray her mourning in Oliver Bird; Wallace's suits featuring more color and floral designs at times; Busker's swimsuits showing how the character is being used and abused by the Shadow King; and Farouk sporting three-piece suits. Haller's style becomes more British punk, drawing inspirations from Sid Vicious and Johnny Rotten to portray a character coming from one mental institution to another. The season also moves Haller's hair closer to its unique look from the comics, with Stevens saying "it creeps ever higher".

To create the sound of teeth chattering, for the people afflicted with the Catalyst mental virus, Hawley allowed sound supervisor Nick Forshager experiment with different approaches. Simply recording the actors on set chattering their teeth "didn't have that biting sound that we really needed", so they experimented with alternative sounds like horse hooves. They ultimately found that any sound they produced close to teeth chattering came across as fake teeth, so they tried recording the teeth of the sound department's staff in different ways. The final version used in the series was recorded with a Neumann condenser microphone and then digitally manipulated to give it a "kind of eerie multilevel sound".

Production designer Michael Wylie worked to continue the "all time" setting of the series in the second season, taking inspiration from styles and architecture across decades so as not to make the show appear as if it takes place in a specific time or place. Because much of the season takes place in Division 3 headquarters, Wylie wanted to clearly distinguish the sets from those used for Summerland in the first season by changing a recurring motif: circles were used a lot throughout the designs of the first season, and hexagons are throughout the season two sets. He thought this added some "familiarity" to the sets and made things "easier to design, and we also know that whenever you see a hexagon that you know you are in Division 3 without anyone having to tell you". Because of the tendency for a government facility to become "unbearably sterile", Wylie looked to add depth to the sets with custom-made wall paper and complicated floor designs which did not go so far as to make the spaces feel personalized.

The robot-like Vermillion that Division 3 leader Admiral Fukyama communicates through have feminine physiques and mustaches. They went through several variations, with Hawley wanting their look to be based on Dennis Franz. The set in which the Admiral and the Vermillion are introduced was initially going to look like a larger version of the wicker basket that Fukyama wears. The Division 3 dining hall is based on Hawley's idea of a "sushi-go-round" restaurant but with the food on boats floating in water, with Wylie's final design labelled a "1970s Italian waterpark version". The water for the boats zig-zags through the set, causing issues for the crew trying to maneuver around the room. Also built was Cary Loudermilk's "lair", the series' take on a traditional superhero lab, which includes an "amplification chamber" that is an homage to the machine Cerebro that appears in the comics and films. It is based on research into isolation tanks rather than any designs originating in the comics to prevent the series from simply copying what came before.

=== Filming ===
For the season, Hawley looked to move production of the show from Vancouver to California to better accommodate his busy schedule. This was made possible when the show was awarded over $11 million in tax incentives by the California Film Commission under its "Program 2.0" initiative. Hawley called this change of locale "another way that we helped the show not settle into a sort of familiar routine of standing sets and that sort of overly familiar sense of it's the same thing, week in and week out." He added, "I'm going to try and look at southern California in a way that we haven't looked at before, to try and find a way to tell stories that are urban and rural and in the astral plane as it were, and continue to look like nothing else." Filming began on September 28, 2017. The opening sequence of the season was filmed in the backyard of a Hollywood Hills home, in the sun, clearly establishing the different setting from the overcast locations of the first season.

As with the first season, Hawley was committed to emphasizing practical effects when creating the season's visuals. This included creating physical title cards to be filmed rather than digitally adding lettering. Hawley also wanted to explore alternative representations of the usual elements found in superhero series, such as depicting a fight sequence as a dance battle, explaining, "A fight is a very black and white, two-dimensional thing. We're fighting and I'm trying to beat you and you're trying to beat me. But what if the scene is... part of it is peacocking and part of it is a courtship dance and part of it is fighting because 'I hate that I have to work with you' etc. You can't express that in a fight sequence, but in a dance fight you can." Negahban joined the series during production on the eighth episode following the recasting of the Shadow King, and had to reshoot all of the scenes from the first seven episodes featuring the character. Filming for the season took place in a desert.

=== Music ===
Composer Jeff Russo stated in April 2017 that he would begin work on the season, including developing new thematic material, in June after he completed work on the third season of Fargo.

A soundtrack album for the season featuring Russo's score was released digitally on May 25, 2018. All music by Jeff Russo, except where noted:

Legion: Season 2 (Original Television Series Soundtrack)
No.	Title	Length
1.	"Dance Battle"	5:11
2.	"Farouk / The Shadow King"	5:13
3.	"Future Syd"	5:10
4.	"Many Days (Synth)"	12:47
5.	"Where is David?"	8:57
6.	"Lenny and Oliver (Farouk)"	0:55
7.	"Division 3"	0:54
8.	"Orange Bridge"	1:17
9.	"Sliding Door David"	1:00
10.	"End of Life"	0:50
11.	"Lost in the Desert"	1:55
12.	"208 Main on Ends"	1:16
13.	"Laboratory"	0:46
14.	"89 Days"	6:29
15.	"The Magic Man"	2:28
16.	"Carousel"	1:57
17.	"202 Main on Ends" (full version)	2:54

A second album for the season was released August 17, featuring classics reimagined by Russo. Hawley, who pitched song ideas to Russo, provided lead vocals, with Russo backing on harmony vocals and various instruments including the Moog Synthesizer IIIc. Creating the covers were a "unique way to help propel the story,” Russo stated, “All of them have lyrical significance and we thought it would be a great idea to do them in the style of the show's music.” The deluxe edition of the album features a cover of "Behind Blue Eyes" as performed in "Chapter 19" by Dan Stevens and Navid Negahban and a cover of "Road to Nowhere" by Rachel Keller from "Chapter 2" in season one. All music performed by Noah Hawley and Jeff Russo, except where noted:

It's Always Blue: Songs from Legion
No.	Title	Artist	Length
1.	"White Rabbit"		3:54
2.	"White Room"		5:11
3.	"Burning Down the House"		4:37
4.	"Don't Come Around Here No More"		6:18
5.	"Change the World"		4:01
6.	"Superman"		2:56
7.	"Behind Blue Eyes"		3:14
8.	"Nothing in This World"		3:45
9.	"Cornflake Girl"		6:44
10.	"Behind Blue Eyes" (bonus track)	Jeff Russo feat. Dan Stevens & Navid Negahban	3:25
11.	"Road to Nowhere" (bonus track)	Russo feat. Rachel Keller	3:09

=== Shared universe connections ===
For the second season, Hawley wanted to further explore the connections between the series and the wider X-Men universe, particularly in paralleling common elements found throughout the universe such as the "gray approach to morality and how characters can cross that line, like Magneto." This was something Hawley felt was unique to this universe, and "not the same kinda black and white universe that you get in other comic franchises, and so I really wanted to play with that." The season also continues to explore Haller's father, Charles Xavier, though Hawley was reluctant to confirm an appearance by one of the X-Men film actors (Patrick Stewart or James McAvoy) reprising that role for the show since he felt incorporating elements directly from the films "too quickly" was "cheating on some level", rather than telling his own standalone story first.

== Release ==
=== Broadcast ===
The season began airing on FX on April 3, 2018, and consisted of eleven episodes. Hawley had previously said, in March 2017, that he expected the season to begin airing in February 2018.

=== Marketing ===
Footage from the season debuted at the FX Television Critics Association panel in January 2018, introducing Negahban as Farouk in an announcement of his casting. Hawley and several cast members attended the panel. A trailer for the season was released online at the start of March, and multiple commentators noted that it indicated the noteworthy aspects of the first season would be retained for the second—an unreliable narrative, "stunning" visuals, and significant cast members including Stevens, Plaza, and Clement. The dancing featured in the trailer and the introductory footage of Negahban were also highlighted.

An artistic video installation created by Marco Brambilla Studio was open to the public at Goya Studios in Los Angeles from March 30 to April 1, 2018. It consisted of a chamber that several people could be sealed in, with a "moving kaleidoscope of imagery from the series" then displayed on screens around the chamber and onto a series of mirrors above to "completely envelope you in a very trippy, very Legion manner". The images were backed by music, and included teases of the second season. Visitors to the exhibit could also get their photo taken with a series of mirrors that evoked the style of promotional posters released for the season. A "blue carpet" premiere event was held for the season on April 2, at the Directors Guild of America headquarters in Los Angeles.

== Reception ==
=== Ratings ===
Viewership and ratings per episode of Legion season 2
No.	Title	Air date	Rating (18–49)	Viewers (millions)	DVR (18–49)	DVR viewers (millions)	Total (18–49)	Total viewers (millions)
1	"Chapter 9"	April 3, 2018	0.30	0.669	0.4	0.83	0.7	1.501
2	"Chapter 10"	April 10, 2018	0.21	0.439	0.3	0.59	0.5	1.028
3	"Chapter 11"	April 17, 2018	0.16	0.380	—N/a	—N/a	—N/a	—N/a
4	"Chapter 12"	April 24, 2018	0.20	0.434	0.2	—N/a	0.4	—N/a
5	"Chapter 13"	May 1, 2018	0.20	0.456	—N/a	—N/a	—N/a	—N/a
6	"Chapter 14"	May 8, 2018	0.14	0.353	0.3	0.39	0.4	0.746
7	"Chapter 15"	May 15, 2018	0.22	0.451	—N/a	—N/a	—N/a	—N/a
8	"Chapter 16"	May 22, 2018	0.18	0.409	0.2	0.39	0.4	0.797
9	"Chapter 17"	May 29, 2018	0.15	0.362	—N/a	—N/a	—N/a	—N/a
10	"Chapter 18"	June 5, 2018	0.21	0.467	0.2	—N/a	0.4	—N/a
11	"Chapter 19"	June 12, 2018	0.12	0.315	—N/a	—N/a	—N/a	—N/a

=== Critical response ===
The review aggregator website Rotten Tomatoes reported a 91% approval rating for the second season, with an average rating of 7.75/10 based on 160 reviews. The website's critical consensus reads, "Legion returns with a smart, strange second season that settles into a straighter narrative without sacrificing its unique sensibilities." Metacritic, which uses a weighted average, assigned a score of 85 out of 100 based on 10 critics for the season, indicating what the website considers to be "universal acclaim".

=== Accolades ===
For the 70th Primetime Creative Arts Emmy Awards, Dana Gonzales received a nomination for Outstanding Cinematography for a Single-Camera Series (One Hour) for the episode "Chapter 9".
