= Chapter 14 (Legion) =

- Legion episode
- Episode no.: Season 2 Episode 6
- Directed by: John Cameron
- Written by: Noah Hawley
- Cinematography by: Dana Gonzales
- Editing by: Regis Kimble
- Production code: XLN02007
- Original air date: May 8, 2018
- Running time: 48 minutes

Guest appearances
- Katie Aselton as Amy Haller; Molly Hagan as Laura Mercer; Seamus Dever as Don Eichman

Episode chronology
← Previous "Chapter 13"	Next → "Chapter 15"
- Legion season 2

"Chapter 14" is the sixth episode of the second season of the American surrealist superhero thriller television series Legion, based on the Marvel Comics character of the same name. It was written by series creator Noah Hawley and directed by executive producer John Cameron. It originally aired on FX on May 8, 2018.

The series follows David Haller, a "mutant" diagnosed with schizophrenia at a young age. Struggling to differentiate reality from fantasy, he tries to control his mutant powers and combat the sinister forces trying to control him, eventually joining the government agency Division 3 to prevent his nemesis, Amahl Farouk, from finding his original body. In the episode, David's grief leads him to different versions of himself in alternate universes.

According to Nielsen Media Research, the episode was seen by an estimated 0.353 million household viewers and gained a 0.1 ratings share among adults aged 18–49. The episode received positive reviews from critics, who praised the episode's originality and Dan Stevens' performance; however, some expressed criticism with the nature of the episode, with many feeling it didn't properly explore its scenarios nor advance the plot of the season.

== Plot ==
After his sister's death, David (Dan Stevens) starts experiencing many different lives of himself, all of which involve taking different directions.

In one of these, David works in a company and is astounded when he can hear people's thoughts. He tells one of the workers, Laura Mercer (Molly Hagan) that her co-workers are not being fully honest with their deals, earning her respect. David eventually becomes the richest man in the world, to the point that Laura now works for him. In another life, David is homeless and is avoided by the crowds. One day, he is attacked by a group of men, which inadvertently unleashes his powers to kill them off. He is pursued by Division 3, but he easily fends them off, although he is killed by Kerry (Amber Midthunder).

In another life, David works as a warehouse employee, tended by Amy and still taking medication. While walking, he sees the Devil with Yellow Eyes, disturbing him. A police cruiser passing by stops David, who is behaving erratically. The officers begin to arrest him just as Amy arrives, and throw Amy to the ground when she attempts to explain the situation, prompting David to unleash his powers and kill the officers. More officers arrive, who then shoot and kill David, who destroys everything in the vicinity while sparing Amy. Many other lives depicted include David living in a luxurious house; becoming a drug addict that discusses the multiverse; working as a teacher; happily married and becoming a father; working in an office; and an elderly version cared for by Amy.

In one scenario, David attempts suicide, and he dies this time, with Amy visiting his grave. At another point, Amy convinces David to seek help by taking him to Clockworks Psychiatric Hospital, which he agrees to do. As Farouk (Navid Negahban) said, David can only live with the life he can truly imagine. This gets David back to the real world, accepting it.

== Production ==
=== Development ===
In April 2018, it was reported that the sixth episode of the season would be titled "Chapter 14", and was to be directed by executive producer John Cameron and written by series creator Noah Hawley. This was Hawley's ninth writing credit, and Cameron's first directing credit.

=== Writing ===
Noah Hawley came up with the concept after concluding that he didn't have to progress the main storyline at all during the episode. He said, "I just need to take this concept of all the alternate realities in which David did not go to Clockworks, and see all the roads that he could have taken." Due to the nature of the episode, there were talks on what episode order it would go. Hawley initially wanted the episode to be the season premiere, but deemed it unsuitable due to the unconventional narrative of the series, which would further confuse the audience. He decided that the episode after Amy's death was more suitable, also claiming he was proud of the episode.

== Reception ==
=== Viewers ===
In its original American broadcast, "Chapter 14" was seen by an estimated 0.353 million household viewers and gained a 0.1 ratings share among adults aged 18–49, according to Nielsen Media Research. This was a 23% decrease in viewership from the previous episode, which was watched by 0.456 million viewers with a 0.2 in the 18–49 demographics.

=== Critical reviews ===
"Chapter 14" received positive reviews from critics. The review aggregator website Rotten Tomatoes reported an 82% approval rating with an average rating of 8.5/10 for the episode, based on 11 reviews.

Alex McLevy of The A.V. Club gave the episode an "A" grade and wrote, "Even without meth-head David frantically explaining multiverse theory as a sop to audience clarification, 'Chapter 14' comes together marvelously, a meditation on grief, regret, and pain that builds slowly, but earns every second of its cathartic conclusion."

Alan Sepinwall of Uproxx wrote, "A character like David, with his vast and diverse power set, and who has lived his whole life with other voices in his head, would seem to lend himself particularly well to What If? scenarios. But 'Chapter 14' doesn't take the idea far enough. It's almost all set-up and no story, and even the larger emotional point it's making about the importance of Amy to David's life gets lost in the jumping from one reality to another." Evan Lewis of Entertainment Weekly wrote, "The conceit of 'Chapter 14' is a multiverse exploration that Legion, usually so proudly self-aware in its outlandishness, plays with misplaced earnestness."

Oliver Sava of Vulture gave the episode a perfect 5 star rating out of 5 and wrote, "This is the first episode of the season written solely by Noah Hawley, and it's a strange, ambitious chapter that takes a dynamic approach to the idea of multiple realities all existing at the same time." Nick Harley of Den of Geek gave the episode a 4.5 star rating out of 5 and wrote, "So even though 'Chapter 14' decided not to move forward, it looked backward, sideways, adjacent, and down another track in spectacular fashion. I may get upset when Legion decides to kill time, but this episode, which felt more like a short film, only killed the complacency I was starting to feel from the show. Exploring the chaos theory is fun. Now show me a timeline where this show leads to a satisfying conclusion at the end of this season." Josh Jackson of Paste gave the episode an 8 rating out of 10 and wrote, "Legion's second season has been Great Television. 'Chapter 14' is Pretty Great Television. The sense of risk-taking and rule-breaking is still there. And yet, I miss the playfulness of the first few episodes. I miss the Jon Hamm interludes. And I desperately want to see where this is all heading."
