= Chapter 18 (Legion) =

- Legion episode
- Episode no.: Season 2 Episode 10
- Directed by: Dana Gonzales
- Written by: Noah Hawley; Nathaniel Halpern
- Cinematography by: Erik Messerschmidt
- Editing by: Curtis Thurber; Erick Fefferman
- Production code: XLN02009
- Original air date: June 5, 2018
- Running time: 47 minutes

Episode chronology
| ← Previous "Chapter 17" | Next → "Chapter 19" |
- Legion season 2

"Chapter 18" is the tenth episode of the second season of the American surrealist superhero thriller television series Legion, based on the Marvel Comics character of the same name. It was written by series creator Noah Hawley and co-executive producer Nathaniel Halpern and directed by Dana Gonzales. It originally aired on FX on June 5, 2018.

The series follows David Haller, a "mutant" diagnosed with schizophrenia at a young age, as he tries to control his psychic powers and combat the sinister forces trying to control him. Eventually, he joins the government agency Division 3 to prevent his nemesis, fellow psychic mutant Amahl Farouk, from finding his original body. In the episode, the team arrives at the desert, with everyone having different goals, but David sets out to find and kill Farouk.

According to Nielsen Media Research, the episode was seen by an estimated 0.467 million household viewers and gained a 0.2 ratings share among adults aged 18–49. The episode received generally positive reviews from critics, who praised the performances and character development, although some viewed the episode as a needless two-parter season finale while the pacing was also criticized.

== Plot ==
At the desert, Syd exits her tent, discovering a giant plughole in the desert ground. Suddenly, she is hit with a rope and dragged down the hole, while David wonders where she went.

Syd reaches the bottom of the hole, ending in a room with Melanie. Melanie attempts to convince Syd that she should not trust David, indicating that he may not love her. In the desert, David reaches the Mi-Go monastery, where he finds Farouk in the body of Oliver. Using his powers, he starts to torture Oliver so he can reveal Syd's location, which he refuses to disclose. All of this is watched by Syd and Melanie, who wants to show her that David is a monster.

With Syd still believing in David's intentions, Melanie then attempts to showcase how David constantly met with her future self. She also shows her that David is the reason for the incoming apocalypse. Unaware to Syd, Melanie is possessed by Farouk, and sends the minotaur to kill David. In the desert, Cary and Kerry arrive with Division 3 operatives at the plughole. From inside the plughole, monks emerge and emit a high-pitched frequency that fends them off. Kerry overcomes the frequency and subdues the monks, until more monks emerge from the plughole.

With Farouk leaving Oliver's body, he finally gives up on the torture and reveals that Syd was with Farouk. Clark, the Vermillion and more operatives arrive at the monastery with a giant tuning fork called "The Choke". However, Farouk has located his body and abandons Melanie's, finally accomplishing his goal. Back in the plughole, a monk takes Cary inside and Kerry decides to go after him while Lenny stays above, having retrieved the weapon: a paintball gun. As the Vermillion fight the minotaur, Cary escapes. Kerry encounters the minotaur, and fights it with Syd's help.

Cary discovers David in a throne room, having recognized to torturing Oliver and acknowledging that Farouk may have found his body already. David's behavior seems to have changed, and he now seems intent on killing Farouk. Back in the monastery, Clark and the Vermillion try to activate the Choke, which can dampen mutant abilities. Farouk arrives, knocking out Clark and causing the Vermillion to retreat. He uses his powers to throw away the Choke and marvel at his full power. David suddenly arrives, reciting The World's Angriest Boy in the World.

== Production ==
=== Development ===
In May 2018, it was reported that the tenth episode of the season would be titled "Chapter 18", and was to be directed by Dana Gonzales and written by series creator Noah Hawley and co-executive producer Nathaniel Halpern. This was Hawley's thirteenth writing credit, Halpern's tenth writing credit, and Gonzales' first directing credit.

== Reception ==
=== Viewers ===
In its original American broadcast, "Chapter 18" was seen by an estimated 0.467 million household viewers and gained a 0.2 ratings share among adults aged 18–49, according to Nielsen Media Research. This means that 0.2 percent of all households with televisions watched the episode. This was a 29% increase in viewership from the previous episode, which was watched by 0.362 million viewers with a 0.2 in the 18-49 demographics.

=== Critical reviews ===
"Chapter 18" received generally positive reviews from critics. The review aggregator website Rotten Tomatoes reported a 100% approval rating with an average rating of 7.2/10 for the episode, based on 7 reviews.

Alex McLevy of The A.V. Club gave the episode a "B" grade and wrote, "Legion wants us to root for our characters, but also against them. It encourages empathy, then holds us at arms' length while warning us getting attached might be a bad idea."

Evan Lewis of Entertainment Weekly wrote, "Knowing Legion, most of the world-altering events of this penultimate episode could easily be undone in the finale, but even if the reality of 'Chapter 18' is completely different from where the season ends, these events could have lasting consequences." Beth Elderkin of Gizmodo wrote, "This week was supposed to be the Legion season finale, at least until an extra episode was tacked on last month. I'd heard rumors this meant they were ending the series, but given how FX just renewed Legion for a third season, clearly that’s not the case. So, I'm guessing this episode was the bonus content — or at least it helped stretch out the season finale into a two-parter. The result is a deeper character dive without a lot of action. And a clip show to boot."

Oliver Sava of Vulture gave the episode a 3 star rating out of 5 and wrote, "This story is more compelling when the threat comes from within David rather than an outside force." Nick Harley of Den of Geek gave the episode a 3.5 star rating out of 5 and wrote, "As I said, strip away a lot of Legion's off-kilter imagery and some transparent attempts to infuse a little action into 'Chapter 18' and this episode is mainly used to for Syd and Melanie's back-and-forth and David’s dark turn, but those moments are genuinely gripping, well-acted stuff. Hopefully the finale, 'Chapter 19' can wrap a semblance of a bow on this largely uneven season."

=== Accolades ===
TVLine named Jean Smart as an honorable mention as the "Performer of the Week" for the week of June 9, 2018, for her performance in the episode. The site wrote, "Amid its surreal swirl of psychedelic visuals, FX's Legion delivers some powerhouse performances, too, and it was Jean Smart's turn to wow us this week, showing us a terrifyingly dark side to Melanie Bird. Possessed by the Shadow King, Melanie served as a seductive devil on Syd’s shoulder, making her doubt her relationship with David and showing her the horrible things her mutant boyfriend is capable of. Smart expertly transformed Melanie's own heartbreak over Oliver into a biting bitterness, calmly declaring that all men were not to be trusted — including David. It may not have been the real Melanie talking, but we were still delighted to see Smart break bad for once."
