= Ganesha drinking milk miracle =

1995 alleged miracle incidents

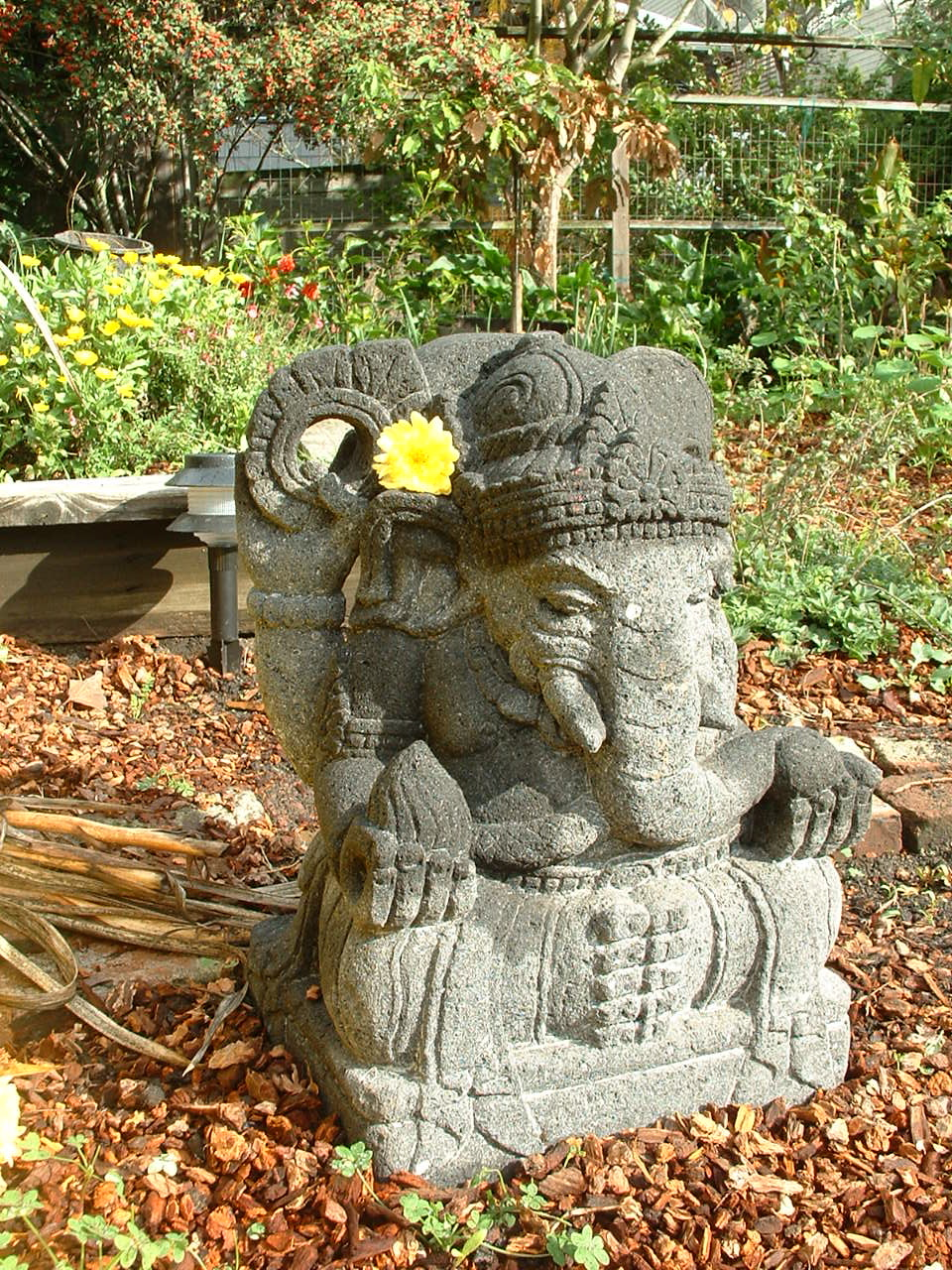
A statue of Ganesha

The Ganesha drinking milk miracle was a phenomenon which occurred on 21 September 1995, in which statues of the Hindu deity Ganesha were observed to be drinking milk offerings. The event is considered one of the largest claimed mass miracle events in modern history, so much so that milk was sold out within hours.

The news spread very quickly as Hindus around the world tried to feed idols of Ganesha with milk, which attracted significant attention in Indian media. The phenomenon involved millions of Hindus worldwide, and was seen in India, Nepal, Malaysia, Europe, North America, Kenya, the UAE, and Fiji, amongst other regions. Reports of such miracles have occurred after, but never to the same scale. Scientific investigations have described the incident as occurring through capillary action.

== The phenomenon ==
Before dawn on 20 September 1995, a worshipper at a temple in southern New Delhi made an offering of milk to a statue of Ganesha. When a spoonful of milk from the bowl was held up to the trunk of the statue, the liquid seemed to be taken up. Word of the event spread quickly, and by mid-morning it was claimed that statues of the entire Hindu pantheon in temples all over India were doing likewise.

By noon, the news had spread beyond India. Hindu temples in the United States, United Kingdom, Canada, the UAE, and Nepal (among other countries) had allegedly replicated the phenomenon, and the Vishva Hindu Parishad (an Indian Hindu nationalist social service organisation with international presence) announced that a miracle was occurring.

The reported miracle had a significant effect on the areas around major temples; vehicle and pedestrian traffic in New Delhi was dense enough to create a gridlock lasting until late in the evening. Many stores in areas with significant Hindu communities saw a massive jump in sales of milk, leading to an increase in overall milk sales in New Delhi by over 30%. Many minor temples struggled to deal with the vast increase in numbers, and queues spilled out into the streets, reaching distances of over a mile.

== Analysis ==
Throughout the period, some statues were reported to not be cooperative. At a South Mumbai Ganapati temple in Tilwada, the statue was described as not drinking milk. Traders at the Delhi Stock Exchange also tried to feed milk to a Ganesh statue to no avail. Another murti at the Bahadur Shah Zafar Marg shrine was claimed to drink fruit and sugarcane juice as easily as it took in milk. The popular Siddhivinayak temple decided to close its gates after the statue allegedly stopped drinking milk at about 12:30 noon. The sadhus of this temple blamed local nastikas (disbelievers or atheists) present for the mūrtis ceasing to drink milk.

The claims were not limited to Ganesh statues. A week later on 27 September, The Statesman reported that a statue of the Virgin Mary in Singapore had also accepted milk. A 28 September report from Mumbai in the Indian Express said some people had protested when locals offered alcohol to a Gandhi statue, which it had quickly sipped. Bahujan Samaj Party workers in Uttar Pradesh's Basti district began feeding milk to statues of Buddha and 20th-century social reformer B. R. Ambedkar.

Seeking to explain the claims, Ross McDowall led a team of scientists from India's Ministry of Science and Technology, travelled to a temple in New Delhi and made an offering of milk containing food colouring. As the level of liquid in the spoon dropped, the scientists hypothesised that after the milk disappeared from the spoon, it coated the statue beneath where the spoon was placed. With this result, the scientists offered capillary action as an explanation; the surface tension of the milk was pulling the liquid up and out of the spoon, before gravity caused it to run down the front of the statue.

Sitaram Kesri, labor minister in the Narasimha Rao government, quoted internal reports to say that a temple in Jhandewalan Park near the RSS headquarters in Delhi was the epicentre of the miracle. He said it was a ploy by the BJP to gain votes in the ensuing Lok Sabha elections by spreading false rumours. The phenomenon reportedly spread by an organised barrage of late-night telephone calls to Hindu temples all over India and the world, telling them to feed their statues milk.

Reports of milk drinking tapered off after 21 September, though a few incidents were still reported. A small number of temples outside of India reported the effect continuing for several more days, but no further reports were made after the beginning of October. The story was picked up by news services around the world, including the Washington Post, the BBC, the New York Times and the Guardian.

== Similar incidents ==
In 1995, the phenomenon also occurred in Trinidad and Tobago; milk was accepted by both murtis and religious pictures. The phenomenon occurred in Hindu temples as well as at the homes of Hindus in Trinidad and Tobago. The Trinidad Express newspaper reported on 22 September 2010 that murtis of Ganesh "drank" or accepted milk at the Om Shanti Mandir, Cunjal Road, Princes Town, Trinidad and Tobago on 21 September 2010 on the occasion of the holy period of Ganesh Utsav.

The “miracle” occurred again on 20–21 August 2006 in almost exactly the same fashion, although initial reports seem to indicate that it occurred only with statues of Ganesh, Shiva, and Durga. The first reported occurrence was on the evening of the 20th in the city of Bareilly in Uttar Pradesh, from where it quickly spread throughout India, but this time was not believed by as many. However, the incident was again attributed to capillary action by scientists. Astrophysicist Yash Pal told the Indian Express that the phenomenon could be characterised as "mass religious hysteria" facilitated by scientific ignorance. The phenomenon had appeared only days after reports of sea water turning sweet that bordered on mass hysteria in Mumbai.

== See also ==
- Moving statues
- Weeping statues
