= Legion (Marvel Comics) =

Fictional character from the Marvel Universe

- Textless cover of New Mutants #21 (March 2011). Art by Dave Wilkins.

Publication information
- Publisher: Marvel Comics
- First appearance: Cameo appearance: The New Mutants #25 (March 1985); Full appearance: The New Mutants #26 (April 1985)
- Created by: Chris Claremont; Bill Sienkiewicz

In-story information
- Alter ego: David Charles Haller
- Species: Human mutant
- Team affiliations: Muir Island X-Men; X-Men
- Notable aliases: Daniel Haller
- Abilities: Power manifestation; Reality warping; Dimensional travel

Legion (David Charles Haller) is a fictional character appearing in American comic books published by Marvel Comics, typically as an antagonist or supporting character in stories featuring the X-Men and related characters.

He is the mutant son of Charles Xavier and Gabrielle Haller. Legion takes the role of an antihero who has a severe mental illness, including a form of dissociative identity disorder in which each of his identities exhibits different mutant abilities or powers.

The character made his live-action debut in the FX television series Legion (2017–2019), portrayed by Dan Stevens.

== Publication history ==
Created by writer Chris Claremont and artist Bill Sienkiewicz, Legion first appeared following the conclusion of The New Mutants #25 (March 1985) in Moira MacTaggert's notes, leading to his full story appearance in the following issue, The New Mutants #26 (April 1985).

In 1991, Legion was assigned to be a co-starring character in the newly revamped X-Factor, as a member of the eponymous superteam. However, writer Peter David was uncomfortable with this, and ultimately editor Bob Harras independently came to the conclusion that Legion should not be used in the series. David explained "I don't mind building a story around [Legion], but working him into a group – you're really asking for a bit much from the reader. Believing that a group of people will come together to form a team is enough of a suspension of disbelief... 'Oh, by the way, one of them is so nuts he shouldn't be setting foot off Muir Island'... that's asking the reader to bend so far he will break."

== Fictional character biography ==
While working in an Israeli psychiatric facility, Charles Xavier met a patient named Gabrielle Haller. The two had an affair which ended amicably. Gabrielle became pregnant with David, but did not tell Charles.

David, at a young age, lives with his mother and godfather, Daniel Shomron, in Paris until Daniel is killed in an attack by antisemitic terrorists. The trauma of the situation causes an initial manifestation of David's mutant powers, as David incinerates the minds of the terrorists. In the process, he unintentionally absorbs the mind of terrorist leader Jemail Karami and is rendered catatonic for years. As he recovers, David is moved to Moira MacTaggert's care at Muir Island. The trauma, possibly in conjunction with his powers, causes David to develop dissociative identity disorder, with each alter manifesting different mutant abilities.

The Karami alter, which manifested telepathic abilities, struggles for years to separate his consciousness from David's. In the process, Karami attempts to unify as many alters as he could, trying to end David's catatonic state. Some of the alters resist Karami, most notably Jack Wayne, a swaggering adventurer who was telekinetic, and Cyndi, a temperamental, rebellious girl who was pyrokinetic. Karami, Wayne, and Cyndi persist as David's most prominent alters.

During his time at Muir Island, David saves Moira and Wolfsbane from a fatal accident by accessing the telekinetic abilities of Jack Wayne. However, this allowed Wayne to take control of David's body and leave the island. The New Mutants track him down and convince Wayne to allow David to again assume control. Soon after, David is possessed by the Shadow King. Under the Shadow King's influence, David kills Destiny and destroys 2/3 of Muir island. When the X-Men and X-Factor defeat the Shadow King, David is left comatose.

=== Legion Quest/Age of Apocalypse ===
Years later, David awakens from his coma, believing his psyche to be fully healed. When he had killed Destiny, David had absorbed her psyche. Destiny gave David vague prophetic guidance about the great world that could exist "if only, years ago, Professor X had been given a real chance to fulfill his dream." David understood these words as a directive to travel back in time and kill Magneto, Xavier's greatest adversary, to allow Professor X to achieve the dream of human-mutant coexistence.

As the X-Men attempt to stop him, Legion travels twenty years into the past, accidentally taking the X-Men with him. When Legion attempts to kill Magneto, Xavier intervenes and is killed, erasing Legion from existence and creating the "Age of Apocalypse" timeline. Ultimately, Bishop repairs the timeline by enlisting the aid of the new reality's X-Men to travel back in time to the moment of Xavier's murder. Bishop confronts Legion, creating a psionic loop that shows him the damage that his actions would cause. David allows the energy to incinerate him, in his last moments apologizing for what he had done.

=== Return ===
It is later revealed that David was transported to Otherplace, a timeless interdimensional limbo, and manifested thousands of alternate personalities. David wanders through Otherplace for an untold period of time, trying to return home. Magik, a mutant able to travel across dimensions, contacts one of David's alters, "The Legion," who can alter reality at a cosmic scale. Magik offers to guide Legion back to this dimension, provided that The Legion would aid her by destroying her nemeses, the Elder Gods.

David re-manifests in the physical world, although his primary personality has been imprisoned in his mindscape by his other alters, allowing the more malicious alters to control his body. One of these alters kills and absorbs the mind of a young girl, Marci Sobol, who becomes another alter within Legion. Legion battles the X-Men until Karma and Magik help him regain control of his body. Afterwards, he is placed in the care of Professor X, Doctor Nemesis, Danger, and Rogue.

Weeks later, Magik brings the Elder Gods to Earth and causes catastrophic destruction across the world. Karma awakens The Legion to fulfill its bargain, erasing the Gods from existence and resetting the world to before they had manifested. After this, David is taken back into the care and treatment of the X-Men.

=== Age of X ===
The Force Warriors. Alternate versions of Unuscione, Hellion, Rachel Summers, Legion, and Psylocke

Believing that David's psyche would be healed if his alters were quarantined, Doctor Nemesis begins to catalog and contain these alters within David's mind. Unbeknownst to Doctor Nemesis and Professor X, David's mind subconsciously perceives this intervention as a threat and creates a "psychic antibody," a powerful new personality, to defend itself. The new personality has a degree of David's underlying ability to alter reality and time. Assuming the appearance of Moira McTaggert, the personality attempts to 'protect' Legion from the 'assault' on his mind by creating a pocket reality where Legion was the hero that he always wanted to be.

The alternate pocket reality, the Age of X, is a dystopia in which mutants are nearly hunted to extinction; the remaining mutants are kept alive by Legion's mutant team, the Force Warriors, who create a force wall to repel attacking human forces. Legion remains unaware that one of his personalities had created this world, and most of the mutants who had been brought into the reality by 'Moira' believed that they had always been there. After learning the truth, Legion speaks to 'Moira,' who offers to create as many universes for him as he wanted. Instead, David absorbs 'Moira' and erases the Age of X reality, restoring its inhabitants to Earth-616.

=== Lost Legions ===
With the Age of X incident underscoring the potentially apocalyptic scope of David's power, Professor X proposes a new approach to help Legion retain control of himself. Instead of isolating David from his alters, Professor X suggests that he learn to co-exist with them. To this end, Doctor Nemesis, Madison Jeffries, and Reed Richards designs a wristband that allows David to access the powers of his alternate selves without being controlled by them. However, this caused six of his alters to escape his mind. While tracking down and re-absorbing the alters, David accidentally absorbs Rogue and suffers severe nervous damage after releasing her time.

=== The Fiend ===
To aid his recovery, Professor X leaves David with Merzah, a powerful empath and telepath who ran a Himalayan monastery. While at the monastery, David gained much greater control of himself, and he stops using the wristband. Under Merzah's tutelage, David creates a facility in his mind where his alters are kept and controlled. While David is at the monastery, Professor X is killed. When Legion senses this, the mental shock causes a catastrophic release of energy that kills Merzah and everyone else at the monastery. David, reaching the full extent of his powers, erases himself from existence.

=== Trauma ===
For unknown reasons, David survives. His mind is again fragmented into many alters, including a malicious new alter, Lord Trauma. Lord Trauma aimed to take over David's mind and body. David is helped by psychotherapist Hannah Jones. While Jones was ultimately able to help Legion defeat Trauma, she remained trapped in David's psyche, while her body is in a vegetative state. To thank Jones, Legion places her psyche into a dream state where she achieves her biggest goals.

=== Reign of X ===
After the X-Men establish Krakoa as a mutant nation, Legion is captured by members of Orchis, who create a psychic weapon that they use to manipulate Krakoa's mutants. After rescuing Legion, Nightcrawler learns that the weapon is a restored Onslaught.

After the Hellfire Gala, Legion joins the Scarlet Witch and Proteus in enhancing Cerebro. They give it the ability to copy the minds of mutants who died prior to its creation and potential mutants who died before their X-Gene activated, enabling them to be resurrected.

== Powers and abilities ==
Doctor Nemesis, Blindfold, and Professor X among Legion's alters.

Legion is an Omega-level mutant who has dissociative identity disorder. Fundamentally, he has the ability to alter reality and time on a cosmic scale at will, but due to his multiple personalities, in practice his abilities vary depending on the dominant personality: each alter has different powers enabled by David's subconscious manipulation of reality. The core personality, David Haller himself, generally does not manifest mutant abilities, but must access various personalities to use their power, sometimes losing control of himself to that personality. Some of Legion's personalities physically transform his body (e.g., manifesting a prehensile tongue, becoming a woman, transforming into a werewolf, etc.). The first alter to manifest, Jemail Karami, was telepathic. Other prominent alters include Jack Wayne (telekinetic) and Cyndi (pyrokinetic). Legion has over a thousand different personalities (the exact number is unknown), and his mind can create additional alters in response to external or internal events.

The cumulative abilities of all his personalities make him one of the most powerful mutants in existence, if not the most powerful. Since the abilities of his personalities stem from his subconscious alteration of reality, Legion is theoretically capable of manifesting any power imaginable.

Legion can absorb other people's psyches into his mind, either intentionally or, if he is next to them when they die, unintentionally. Conversely, in several instances Legion has had personalities manifest and act separately from him (or even against him) in the physical world; in most instances Legion has ultimately reabsorbed these personalities back into himself. Presumably, both his absorption of other psyches and the physical manifestations of his own personalities are enabled by Legion's underlying ability to alter reality/time at will.

Generally, David's ability to access and control his personalities/powers is closely tied to his self confidence and self esteem: the better he feels about himself, the more control he exercises. Unfortunately, David often suffers from self-doubt and self-recrimination, meaning that he must struggle to remain in control.

=== Personalities ===
The following characters are different personalities of Legion that have appeared thus far, each one manifesting different powers:

- Jemail Karami (Personality #2) is a terrorist with telepathic abilities.
- Jack Wayne (Personality #3) is a roustabout adventurer who possesses telekinesis. This personality was often quite dangerous and would not hesitate to hurt or kill others if it would allow him to remain independent/free from David's control. Jack Wayne was later subsumed by the personality Lord Trauma.
- Cyndi (Personality #4) is a rebellious girl who possesses pyrokinesis. This personality of Legion has a crush on Cypher.
- The Legion (Personality #5, which claims to be Legion's "real me") can warp time and reality. Magik nicknamed this personality the "God-Mutant."
- Sally (Personality #67) is an obese woman who possesses immense strength.
- Lucas (Personality #115) can channel sound into energy blasts.
- Personality #181 can enlarge himself to an undetermined size. This was the first power Legion utilized with the Neural Switchboard Wristband.
- Johnny Gomorrah (Personality #186) can transmute objects into salt.
- Time-Sink (Personality #227) can manipulate time.
- Personality #302 can move at supersonic speeds.
- Styx (Personality #666) can absorb the consciousness of anyone he touches, turning that person's body into a shell that he can then control. The possessed individual can still access any special abilities they have, and there does not appear to be a limit to the number of individuals simultaneously controlled. David considers this manipulative personality his most dangerous, because it is clever, cruel, and extremely ambitious. Styx was able to become independent from Legion, manifesting as a desiccated corpse, and tried to take control of Legion himself, so that he could use Legion's reality-altering powers to remake the world according to his will. Legion, using the power of his Chain personality, managed to trick and reabsorb Styx.
- Personality #762 is a pirate who can generate acidic gas.
- Personality #898 is a centaur.
- Delphic (Personality #1012) is a blue-skinned, seemingly-omniscient female seer who will answer any three questions from supplicants.

Legion personalities that have not been assigned numbers include:

- Absence is an alien/demon creature with its eyes sewn shut who claims to have traveled through different realities and can siphon heat and love.
- Bleeding Image is a living voodoo doll who can redirect and amplify the pain from any injury he inflicts on himself onto his victims. Bleeding Image later gains independence, but is destroyed by Magneto.
- Chain is effectively a human virus who turns anyone he touches into a copy of himself with a new weapon. The power dissipates when the original is dealt with.
- Chronodon is a dinosaur with a clock on its face. Based on its name and appearance, it can be assumed that it can manipulate time in some way.
- Clown is a surly-looking clown who can blast energy from his mouth.
- Compass Rose can locate any person and teleport to them.
- The Delusionaut is a train driver with a billow stack for a head who uses the smoke that he exudes to create realistic illusions. He manifested outside of Legion to help him at one point, and eventually was one of the personalities that volunteered to meld together to form Gestalt.
- Drexel is a foul-mouthed simpleton with super-strength.
- Endgame is a huge and aggressive armor that instantly manifests the perfect counter to any attack executed against it.
- The Fiend/"Charles Xavier" is a dangerous personality David created following the mental shock of the death of his father Professor X. The Fiend manifests as either a yellow goblin-like creature or in the guise of Professor X. The Fiend has significant psychic abilities, including precognition and possession, and can kill other Legion personalities in Legion's mind, absorbing their power. Eventually, the Fiend became independent from David and tried to help him retain more control of himself.
- Findel the Finder can find anyone across the galaxy.
- Gestalt is a powerful fusion of several Legion personalities with the core personality of David himself, allowing the abilities of these personalities to manifest simultaneously under David's control. Legion created Gestalt to successfully repel an attack on his mind.
- Hugh Davidson is a stereotypical prepster with a long prehensile tongue.
- Hunter is a macho-man personality David's mind created to replace Jack Wayne, when that personality was subsumed by the Lord Trauma personality.
- Hypnobloke is a gentleman with flashing swirls for eyes who wears a top hat and carries a pocket watch. He has the power of hypnotic suggestion.
- Joe Fury is an angry young man who can generate flame and other types of energy, and whom David struggles to repress.
- Kirbax the Kraklar is a demonic creature that can fly and generate electricity.
- Ksenia Nadejda Panov is a Moscovite heiress, discus-throwing champion, caviar exporter, and torturer of puppies. She has the ability to generate ionic scalpels from her fingers.
- K-Zek the Conduit is an android with the ability of far-field, concentrated wireless energy transfer (or WET).
- Lord Trauma. Trauma was eventually destroyed.
- Marci Sabol is a normal human girl who befriended David, but was killed and absorbed into him by the White Witch Doctor. She has significant influence within David's mindscape.
- Max Kelvin is a crotchety old man whose eyes protrude when he uses his powers of plasmatic flame generation.
- Moira Kinross/X is a mother figure created by David's mind to protect his mindscape from tampering. This persona, which could warp reality, became independent from David and created the dystopian pocket reality dubbed Age of X where David was seen as a hero. Within this pocket reality X was practically omnipotent, altering the mindsets and personalities of the fabricated entities in her reality.
- Mycolojester is a plant-like entity with the attire of a jester, who can emit toxic spores from his skin. These spores act as a powerful nerve gas, but can be dissipated by water. This personality volunteered to help David by merging with several other personalities to become Gestalt.
- Non-Newtonian Annie is a skinny purple woman dressed in pink clothes and cloaked in a "zero-tau nullskin" that does not conform to the law of conservation of energy (e.g., kinetic energy that hits it is immediately amplified and reflected directly back on its source).
- Origamist is one of the most powerful personalities in David's mind. He is a reality-warping sumo wrestler who can fold spacetime, allowing, among other things, instant teleportation of any object to any location.
- Protozoan Porter is a large green leech-like being who can teleport by disassembling himself into minuscule ameboid-like parts that reassemble after reaching his destination. This personality volunteered to help David by merging with several other personalities to create Gestalt.
- Pukatus Jr. is a small cherub-like demon who can vomit an acidic substance.
- Skinsmith can produce artificial skin on any surface or bend/alter the skin of others.
- Specs is a nervous young man with large glasses who can see through solid objects. This personality develops a romantic interest in Magma.
- Susan in Sunshine is a young girl with the ability to manipulate emotions.
- Tami Haar is a nightclub singer who is a friend and companion to David. She appears to have a master knowledge of David's mindscape, which among other things allows her to manifest in the real world.
- Tyrannix the Abominoid is a small hapless Cthulhu-like creature with telepathic powers. When David traveled within his mindscape, he often used Tyrannix as a backpack. Tyrannix was the first personality to volunteer to help David by melding to create Gestalt.
- The Weaver is a large arachnid creature who is wreathed in bright light. The Weaver can change and refabricate reality itself, and it is ultimately revealed to be either David's core self or a mirror of David. When David and the Weaver unite, he can observe and alter all time and space at will; David, aware of the extent and implications of this godlike power, attempted to unmake himself by erasing his own birth. For unknown reasons his attempt failed (it may have been undermined by other aspects of David's psyche), in the process creating the Lord Trauma personality.
- The White Witch Doctor is a murderous white man dressed as a witch doctor who killed Marci Sabol and absorbed her psyche into Legion, creating the Marci Sabol personality.
- Wormhole Wodo can open a wormhole between two points anywhere in the galaxy, allowing near instantaneous travel between them.
- Zari Zap is a young punk woman with short, spiked hair who can manipulate electricity.
- Zero G. Priestly is a robed priest who floats upside down and can control gravity.
- Zubar is a personality that likes to call himself "the Airshrike" and has the power to levitate himself.

=== Equipment ===
Following the Age of X, David briefly used a Neural Switchboard Wristband engineered by Doctor Nemesis, Madison Jeffries, and Reed Richards. This device allowed Legion to utilize a personality's power set for several seconds without being overwhelmed by that personality. However, he soon abandoned this and attempted instead to develop a more organic control over his personalities.

== Mentality ==
Legion has been described as having dissociative identity disorder. In his first appearance he was also described as autistic, however this diagnosis has not been used since.

=== Origin of name ===
Legion's name is derived from a passage in the Christian Bible (found in Mark 5 and Luke 8). In it, Jesus asks a man possessed by many evil spirits what his name is, to which the man replies "I am Legion, for we are many".

== Reception ==
- In 2014, Entertainment Weekly ranked Legion 21st in their "Let's rank every X-Man ever" list.
- In 2018, Comic Book Resources (CBR) ranked Legion 14th in their "8 X-Men Kids Cooler Than Their Parents (And 7 Who Are Way Worse)" list, and 1st in their "20 Most Powerful Mutants From The '80s" list.

== Other versions ==
=== Ultimate Marvel ===
The Ultimate Marvel incarnation of Proteus is a composite character with elements of Legion. This version is David Xavier, the son of Moira MacTaggert and Charles Xavier.

=== Ultimate Universe ===
An alternate universe version of David Haller from Earth-6160 appears in Ultimate Wolverine. This version was killed in a landslide alongside his mother Gabrielle Haller and transferred his consciousness into computer code. Sometime later, Beast found David's consciousness in cyberspace and convinced his personalities to work together. David's consciousness was placed in the Opposition's network, where his personalities worked together as "The One" to treat psychological issues.

== In other media ==
=== Television ===
- Legion via David, Lucas, and an original personality named Ian, a young mute boy with pyrokinesis, appears in the X-Men: Evolution episode "Sins of the Son", voiced by Kyle Labine. This version's body transforms to reflect the personality controlling him. Additionally, due to the series' younger target audience, his connection to Professor X is toned down.
- A character partially based on Legion named Takeo Sasaki appears in Marvel Anime: X-Men, voiced by Atsushi Abe in the Japanese version and by Steve Staley in the English dub. Similarly to Legion, Takeo is the son of Professor X. Additionally, while Legion himself does not appear, he is stated to be responsible for creating "Demon-Hall Syndrome", a mutant affliction that manifests secondary mutations, such as multiple personalities, uncontrolled physical mutations, and psychological instability.
- David Haller / Legion appears in Legion, portrayed by Dan Stevens as an adult; Tobias Austen and Noah Hegglin Houben as an infant; Sebastian Billingsley-Rodriguez as a toddler, Christian Convery, Luke Rosseler, and Jacob Hoppenbrouwer in different stages of his childhood; and Alex Mulgrew as a teenager. This version was diagnosed with schizophrenia instead of dissociative identity disorder whose reality-warping abilities are often confused with psionic abilities such as telepathy and telekinesis. Throughout the first season, he enters a relationship with body-swapping mutant Sydney Barrett and discovers the Shadow King has lived in his mind since childhood before the latter possesses another psychic mutant named Oliver Bird. In the second season, David pursues the Shadow King, only to join forces with him to avert a future plague and become more psychopathic. In the third season, David starts a cult and recruits a mutant with time-traveling capabilities called Switch to help him warn his parents Professor X and Gabrielle Haller. However, he puts his mother into a catatonic state. Eventually, he confronts his father before attempting to kill the Shadow King for ruining his life, but reconciles with him instead, creating a new timeline in the process.
  - Additionally, an alternate reality version of David resembling his comic book counterpart appears in the episode "Chapter 18", also portrayed by Stevens.

== Collected editions ==
=== Solo series ===
Title	Material collected	Publication date	ISBN
X-Men Legacy Vol. 1: Prodigal	X-Men Legacy (vol. 2) #1–6	May 7, 2013	978-0785162490
X-Men Legacy Vol. 2: Invasive Exotics	X-Men Legacy (vol. 2) #7–12	September 17, 2013	978-0785167181
X-Men Legacy Vol. 3: Revenants	X-Men Legacy (vol. 2) #13–18	December 3, 2013	978-0785167198
X-Men Legacy Vol. 4: For We Are Many	X-Men Legacy (vol. 2) #19–24	May 6, 2014	978-0785154327
X-Men Legacy: Legion Omnibus	X-Men Legacy (vol. 2) #1–24	April 20, 2017	978-1302903923
Legion: Trauma	Legion #1–5	July 31, 2018	978-1302911621

X-Men Legacy volumes 1–4 were rereleased as Legion: Son of X volumes 1–4 in 2018.

=== Storylines ===
Title	Material collected	Publication date	ISBN
X-Men: Legion Quest	Uncanny X-Men #318–321, X-Men #38–41, X-Men Unlimited #4–7, X-Men Annual #3, X-Factor #107–109, Cable #20	April 17, 2018	978-1302910389
X-Men: Age of X	Age of X Alpha #1, X-Men Legacy #245–247, New Mutants #22–24, Age of X Universe #1–2, Age of X Historical Logs	January 11, 2012	978-0785152903
X-Men: Legion – Shadow King Rising	New Mutants #26–28, 44, Uncanny X-Men #253–255, 278–280, X-Factor #69–70	January 30, 2018	978-1302909550

== See also ==
- Crazy Jane – A DC Comics character who is often linked and compared to Legion
- Stephanie Maas – A Joe's Comics character with superpowers and dissociative identity disorder
