= Shadow King =

Comic book character

- Textless variant cover of Astonishing X-Men (vol. 4) #1 (September 2017). Art by Dale Keown.

Publication information
- Publisher: Marvel Comics
- First appearance: The Uncanny X-Men #117 (January 1979)
- Created by: Chris Claremont; John Byrne

In-story information
- Alter ego: Amahl Farouk
- Species: Ancient entity and human mutant
- Team affiliations: Dark X-Men; Gladiators; Brotherhood of Mutants
- Abilities: Telepathy; Possession; Immortality

The Shadow King (Amahl Farouk) is a supervillain appearing in American comic books published by Marvel Comics, primarily as an enemy of the X-Men. His nemesis is the X-Men's leader, Professor X, while he also figures into the backstory of the X-Man Storm. As originally introduced, Farouk was a human mutant from Egypt who used his vast telepathic abilities for evil, taking the alias Shadow King. Later writers established Farouk as the modern incarnation of an ancient evil entity.

The Shadow King has appeared in various adaptations of X-Men stories. The character's live-action debut is as the primary antagonist in the television series Legion, portrayed by Aubrey Plaza and Navid Negahban.

== Publication history ==
Created by writer Chris Claremont and illustrator/co-writer John Byrne, the character the Shadow King first appeared in The Uncanny X-Men #117 (January 1979) as the telepathic mutant Amahl Farouk.

X-Treme X-Men and X-Men: True Friends reveal the Shadow King to be an entity of the astral plane which has existed since the dawn of humanity, an ethereal demon preferring to enslave the bodies of telepaths and psychics and use their capabilities to enslave others. As a side effect of its greed, hedonism and lack of self-control, the Shadow King's long-term telepathic hosts are often morbidly obese.

== Fictional character biography ==
The Shadow King claims to be a multiversal manifestation of the dark side of the human consciousnesses.

Taking control of Amahl Farouk, the Shadow King became a crime lord in Egypt, controlling Cairo's Thieves Quarter. He encountered a young Charles Xavier and attempted to persuade Xavier to join him. However, Xavier refused and defeated Farouk with a psychic attack.

=== New Mutants ===
The Shadow King possesses Karma, a member of the New Mutants, after she is apparently killed. Through Karma, the Shadow King has the Gladiators abduct Magma and Sunspot and pits them against their teammates Cannonball and Magik.

The remaining New Mutants and Storm battle their teammates in Cairo, where Karma takes control of Storm and Mirage. Magik, realizing that Karma is possessed, releases her teammates from Karma's control and Karma from the Shadow King. After losing his host, the Shadow King possesses Cypher. However, Karma defeats the Shadow King in a duel and forces him to flee.

=== Muir Island saga ===
The Shadow King resurfaces during the "Muir Island Saga" and sets a trap to capture Storm, using Polaris as an anchor. When X-Factor learns that Polaris is being controlled, the Shadow King possesses Legion, intending to use him to destroy Muir Island. The possessed Legion devastates Muir Island, returning Professor X to a paraplegic state. Professor X offers the Shadow King a chance to redeem himself, but he refuses. Legion is left comatose.

=== Psi-War ===
Psylocke falls into the Shadow King's trap, causing a chain reaction that damages the psionic plane and harms superhumans with psychic powers. She eventually confronts the Shadow King and discovers that the Shadow King has left his nexus, the soul of every person on the Psionic Plane, exposed. Psylocke contains the nexus, trapping the Shadow King.

=== X-Men: Worlds Apart ===
The Shadow King reappears in Wakanda, where he kills a Wakandan priest and frames former New X-Men member Gentle for the crime. The Shadow King is confronted by Bast, who devours his astral form.

=== Brotherhood of Evil Mutants ===
The Shadow King appears as a member of Daken's Brotherhood of Mutants in a plot to attack X-Force. The Brotherhood unsuccessfully plans to compel Evan Sabahnur to put on Apocalypse armor, make the Shadow King control him and destroy Jean Grey's school. Psylocke locks the Shadow King in Omega White's body and entrusts him to Brian Braddock.

=== Dawn of X ===
It is revealed that Farouk and the Shadow King are actually two different individuals. Having been born in Egypt Eyalet, to a merchant trader, during the sixteenth century, Farouk is a mutant whose psychic powers emerged at a young age. After his father died from a plague, Farouk was approached by the Shadow King, who possessed him.

In time, the Shadow King sets his plans in motion and begins seducing several young mutants who are unsure of themselves, including Gabrielle Kinney and Rahne Sinclair. However, Gabrielle begins to suspect Farouk and is subsequently killed by Rahne, whom he had placed under his mind control. Gabrielle is resurrected and confronted by the senior New Mutants before Farouk draws all of them into the astral plane. The young mutants confront the Shadow King, encouraging Farouk to dissolve his connection with him, restoring his human mind and personality. Scarred by his connection with the Shadow King, Farouk leaves Krakoa to be rehabilitated.

== Powers and abilities ==
Originally presented as a telepathic mutant second only to Professor X, the Shadow King preys on the bodies of powerful psychics. He uses captive psychics to enslave others.

== Other versions ==
=== Age of Apocalypse ===
An alternate universe version of the Shadow King from Earth-295 appears in Age of Apocalypse. This version is an agent of Apocalypse who became a disembodied, cloud-like entity after Charles Xavier destroyed his body.

=== Mutant X ===
In an alternate universe, the Shadow King conquered the Hellfire Club. In the Mutant X dimension, he merged with Professor Xavier to form an evil being.

=== Ultimate Marvel ===
An alternate universe version of Amahl Farouk / Shadow King from Earth-1610 appears in Ultimate X-Men. This version is Storm's lover and the leader of the group of thieves which she and Lady Deathstrike are a part of. After Storm's mutant powers manifest, she accidentally electrocutes Farouk, rendering him comatose. Farouk's mind enters another dimension, where he encounters the Brood and becomes the Shadow King.

=== Ultimate Universe ===
An alternate universe version of the Shadow King appears in the Ultimate Universe. This version is Shinobu Kageyama, a Japanese boy and member of a mutant cult.

=== X-Men '92 ===
An alternate universe version of the Shadow King, inspired by the X-Men: The Animated Series incarnation of the character, appears in Secret Wars.

== In other media ==
=== Television ===
- Shadow King appears in X-Men: The Animated Series, voiced by Maurice Dean Wint.
- Shadow King appears in the Wolverine and the X-Men episode "Overflow", voiced by Kevin Michael Richardson.

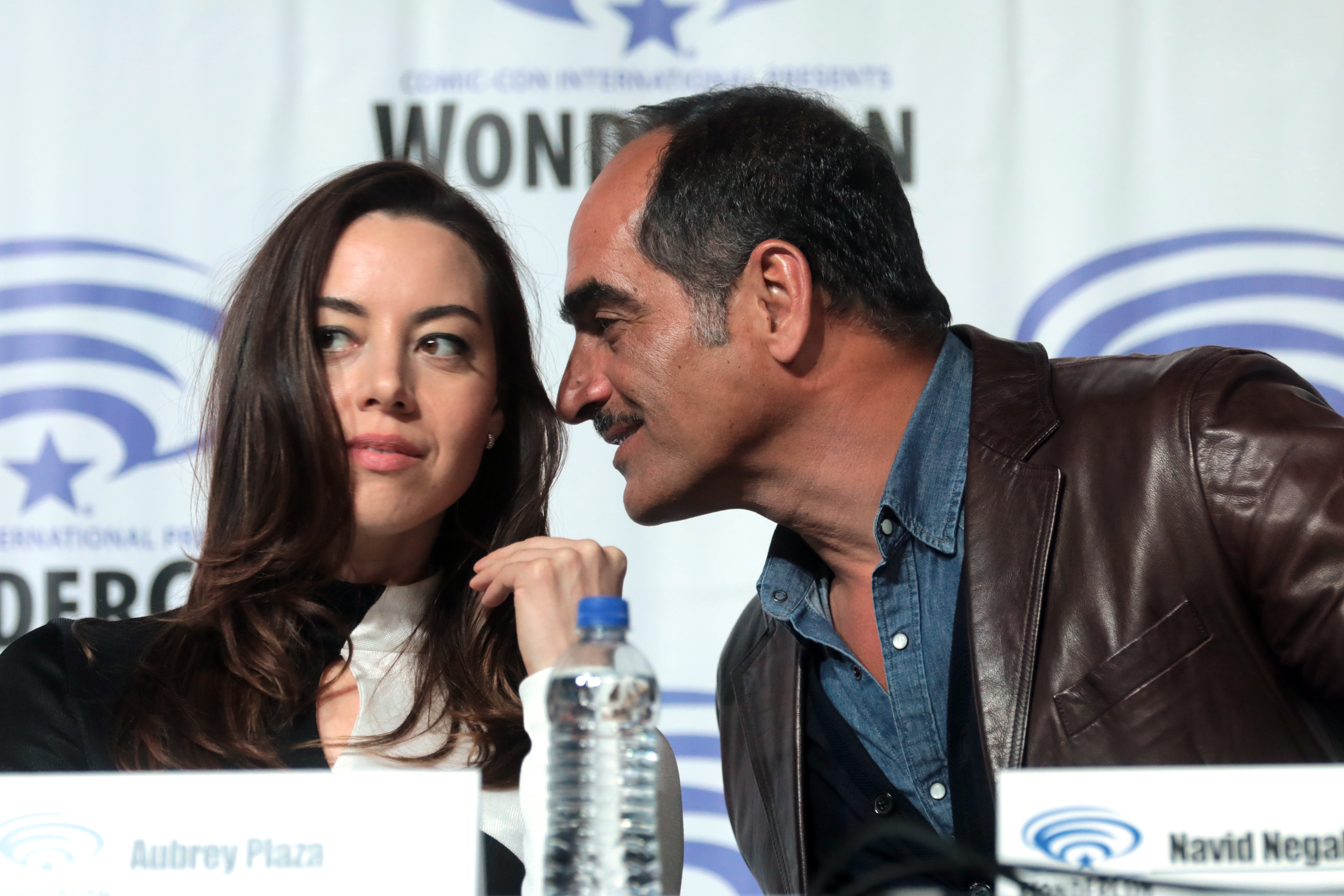
Aubrey Plaza and Navid Negahban play Amahl Farouk / Shadow King in Legion.

- Amahl Farouk / Shadow King appears in Legion, portrayed primarily by Aubrey Plaza in the first season (in the form of Lenny Busker) and Navid Negahban in the second and third seasons (in his original likeness). Prior to the revelation of the character's identity, he was referred to by David Haller as "the Devil with the Yellow Eyes" (portrayed by Quinton Boisclair).

=== Video games ===
- Shadow King appears in X-Men Legends, voiced by Dorian Harewood.
- Shadow King appears as a playable character in Marvel Snap.
- Shadow King appears as a playable character in Marvel Strike Force.
