= Legion season 1 =

Legion
- Season 1
- Promotional poster
- Showrunner: Noah Hawley
- Starring: Dan Stevens; Rachel Keller; Aubrey Plaza; Bill Irwin; Jeremie Harris; Amber Midthunder; Katie Aselton; Jean Smart
- No. of episodes: 8

Release
- Original network: FX
- Original release: February 8 – March 29, 2017

Season chronology
- Next → Season 2

The first season of the American surrealist superhero thriller television series Legion premiered at the Pacific Design Center on January 26, 2017, before airing on FX from February 8 to March 29, totaling eight episodes. The series is based on the Marvel Comics character David Haller, a mutant diagnosed with schizophrenia at a young age, who learns that his illness may actually be powerful psychic abilities. It was produced by FX Productions in association with Marvel Television, with Noah Hawley serving as showrunner.

Dan Stevens stars as David, with Rachel Keller, Aubrey Plaza, Bill Irwin, Jeremie Harris, Amber Midthunder, Katie Aselton, and Jean Smart also starring in the season. FX ordered a pilot for Legion in October 2015, which Hawley wrote and directed. The show was picked up to series in May 2016. Filming took place in Vancouver, with a focus on in-camera effects over visual effects. Hawley wanted to show David as an "unreliable narrator", with the series mixing retro and modern designs, using unconventional filming and musical techniques, and being structured so the audience is unsure what is real. The narrative becomes clearer throughout the season as David gains knowledge, and the villainous Shadow King is revealed. The latter takes several forms, including one portrayed by Plaza.

The season received critical acclaim for its cast, particularly Stevens; Hawley's visuals and design; and the nonlinear, unreliable nature of the storytelling. Several critics did note that the latter aspects would not be for all viewers, and some criticized this as just the latest in a trend of series with unreliable narratives. On March 15, Legion was renewed for a second season.

== Episodes ==
No. overall	No. in season	Title	Directed by	Written by	Original release date	Prod. code	U.S. viewers (millions)
1	1	"Chapter 1"	Noah Hawley	Noah Hawley	February 8, 2017	XLN01001	1.622
David Haller is being interrogated by government officials who believe he may be the most powerful mutant discovered. He explains that he was diagnosed as schizophrenic when he was young, and was taken to Clockworks Psychiatric Hospital after attempting to commit suicide. He spent six years as a patient there, during which time he met Sydney "Syd" Barrett, a girl who refused to be touched. She agreed to be his girlfriend, but was eventually discharged from the hospital. Before she left, David kissed her goodbye, causing their minds to switch bodies. Losing control, Syd unleashed abilities from David's body that killed his friend Lenny Busker and trapped the other patients in their rooms. David was evacuated in Syd's body. Later, David's body returned to him, and he went looking for Syd. David found himself being chased by two people until he was captured by the government. Now those two people, Ptonomy Wallace and Kerry Loudermilk, break into the interrogation site with Syd to rescue David and take him to Melanie Bird.
2	2	"Chapter 2"	Michael Uppendahl	Noah Hawley	February 15, 2017	XLN01002	1.133
At Summerland, Melanie's facility, David begins "memory work" with Ptonomy, who remembers everything and can enter others' memories. Melanie explains that David had been captured by Division 3, a government agency focused on capturing and studying mutants. She instead wants to help David, by showing him that the onset of his "illness" was just his powers manifesting. In David's childhood memories, he is haunted by a children's book his father read to him, The World's Angriest Boy in the World, in which the title character murders his mother. In his memories before his admission to Clockworks, David took drugs with Lenny to try to block out the voices he hears. Melanie places David in an MRI scanner to study how his brain works, during which he accidentally projects his mind to present day Clockworks, where his sister Amy is looking for him. Amy is detained by Division 3, causing David to panic and teleport the MRI scanner outside Summerland. David races to save Amy, but Syd convinces him to wait and master his powers first.
3	3	"Chapter 3"	Michael Uppendahl	Peter Calloway	February 22, 2017	XLN01003	1.043
David continues memory work with Ptonomy and Melanie, exploring his time taking drugs before his admission to Clockworks. As they watch this unfold, David is haunted by apparitions, his mind works against Ptonomy's powers, and he accidentally teleports their physical bodies to a different room. While undergoing more tests, David again loses control, projecting both his mind and Syd's to Division 3, where they find Amy being interrogated. One of her interrogators, a mutant called the Eye, sees these projections before they return to their bodies. Melanie explains that the Eye is Walter, one of the founders of Summerland, alongside her missing husband Oliver and the scientist Cary Loudermilk. Desperate for a breakthrough with David, Melanie sedates him to a point where she, Ptonomy, and Syd can enter his mind and explore freely. However, his "memories" work against them, with a manifestation of the World's Angriest Boy in the World chasing them through a version of David's childhood home, until all three are forced out of David's head.
4	4	"Chapter 4"	Larysa Kondracki	Nathaniel Halpern	March 1, 2017	XLN01004	0.750
David does not wake up from the sedative, and the others are unable to trust the "memories" that they have seen. To investigate what actually happened before David was admitted to Clockworks, Melanie sends Syd, Ptonomy, and Kerry—a warrior woman who lives inside Cary and only comes out for "action"—to find David's ex-girlfriend Philly. Ptonomy enters Philly's memories, and investigates the office of David's old psychologist Poole, and learns that David's friend was a man named Benny (not a woman named Lenny), and that David attacked Poole, who now lives in a lighthouse. At the lighthouse, the trio begin discussing David with Poole, until he reveals himself to be the Eye, with the lighthouse surrounded by Division 3 soldiers. Meanwhile, David's mind is lost in the astral plane, where he comes across a trapped Oliver. David refuses to wait for rescue with Oliver, and instead escapes himself with encouragement from an apparition of Lenny. David rescues the others from the Eye, who shoots Kerry as he escapes.
5	5	"Chapter 5"	Tim Mielants	Peter Calloway	March 8, 2017	XLN01005	0.795
Kerry is brought back to Summerland, where Cary heals her. David tells Melanie about Oliver, and demonstrates his mastery of the astral plane by creating a room where he and Syd can be together without her physical powers interfering. David soon escapes to rescue Amy, and Melanie's team arrives at Division 3 to find almost everyone murdered by David. After going over David's scans, Cary deduces that David's mind is infected with a parasite that he knows as the gruesome Devil with Yellow Eyes. David takes Amy to their childhood home, where she reveals that he was adopted; Lenny appears to emerge from David's mind and explains that she has been in control of his body. Melanie's team tracks them to the house, followed by the Eye, and find Lenny attacking David. The Eye shoots at David, and Syd has him take them to their astral room. There David is helpless as the Devil with Yellow Eyes attacks Syd, until he wills their entire group to an astral fantasy: as patients at Clockworks under the care of Lenny.
6	6	"Chapter 6"	Hiro Murai	Nathaniel Halpern	March 15, 2017	XLN01006	0.732
In the shared hallucination, Lenny discusses personal issues with each of the team, such as Melanie's refusal to let go of her long-missing husband, Ptonomy's vivid memory of his mother dying when he was a child, and Cary and Kerry's co-dependency. Though most of the group are unaware of the true nature of their surroundings, Syd notices that their new reality is different from some of her memories. Lenny confronts Syd, and places her in a coma. Cary is visited by Oliver, who takes him to his home on the astral plane. Kerry looks for Cary, but is attacked and chased by the Eye. Oliver appears to Melanie, and leads her to the physical room where their bodies are. Time appears to them to have slowed, with their physical bodies frozen and the bullets shot by the Eye having not yet reached Syd and David. Lenny, who is shown to be another form of the Devil with Yellow Eyes, reveals that she once knew David's biological father and specifically targeted David. She then shows her control of David's mind by locking him in a corner of his own mind.
7	7	"Chapter 7"	Dennie Gordon	Jennifer Yale	March 22, 2017	XLN01007	0.716
On the astral plane, Oliver explains to Cary that he has been watching David and believes this parasite is Amahl Farouk, the Shadow King, a powerful mutant that they are both aware of. Cary explains that his physical body holds a device that may be able to temporarily isolate the parasite from David's mind. Cary wakes Syd, and sends her to help the others, while he, Oliver, and Melanie attempt to affect the physical world by getting the device to David. Farouk as Lenny attacks Syd, Kerry, and the Eye, killing the latter (his physical body dies as well). David realizes that Farouk and his father were both powerful mutants who had fought some time ago, with Farouk losing. His father then put David up for adoption to protect him from Farouk, but the latter was able to find David and infect his mind since he was young. With the device locking Farouk away in David's mind, he returns to his physical body and catches the bullets. The group then return to Summerland, but are attacked there by Division 3 soldiers. Farouk begins to break free.
8	8	"Chapter 8"	Michael Uppendahl	Noah Hawley	March 29, 2017	XLN01008	0.812
During David's initial breakout from Division 3, Clark, his interrogator, was severely burned. Clark struggles to recover, but insists on returning to field work. Clark leads Division 3's soldiers to Summerland, but David uses his powers to easily subdue them. David captures Clark and negotiates with him; Clark's superiors watch through a camera hidden in his prosthetic eye. Cary and Oliver try to extract Farouk, who is getting stronger, from David. Farouk uses David's mind to talk to Syd, and warns her that David will not survive the extraction. Syd decides to kiss David, transferring Farouk to her own body. Farouk leaves Syd and enters Kerry, and uses her to fight off the others until he is confronted by David. David forces Farouk from Kerry, but unknowingly into Oliver's body. Farouk escapes Summerland in Oliver's body, while Clark agrees to work with the mutants to stop him. Later, David is miniaturized and trapped by a drone-like device.

== Cast and characters ==
=== Main ===
- Dan Stevens as David Haller
- Rachel Keller as Sydney "Syd" Barrett
- Aubrey Plaza as Lenny Busker
- Bill Irwin as Cary Loudermilk
- Jeremie Harris as Ptonomy Wallace
- Amber Midthunder as Kerry Loudermilk
- Katie Aselton as Amy Haller
- Jean Smart as Melanie Bird

=== Recurring ===
- Hamish Linklater as Clark
- David Selby as Brubaker
- Scott Lawrence as Henry Poole
- Jemaine Clement as Oliver Bird

== Production ==
=== Development ===
In October 2015, FX ordered a pilot for Legion, with Marvel Television and FX Productions producing; FX Productions would handle the physical production. Hawley was set to write the pilot, and executive produce the series alongside X-Men film producers Lauren Shuler Donner, Bryan Singer, and Kinberg, Marvel Television executives Jeph Loeb and Jim Chory, and Hawley's Fargo collaborator John Cameron. Steve Blackman, Alan Fine, Stan Lee, Joe Quesada, and Karim Zreik also executive produce. By January 2016, FX President John Landgraf was confident that the series would be picked up by the network, probably for ten episodes; that May, FX ordered an eight-episode first season of Legion. Landgraf later explained that only eight episodes were ordered because FX wanted Hawley to run the series at his own pace rather than try and "pad" it out.

=== Writing ===
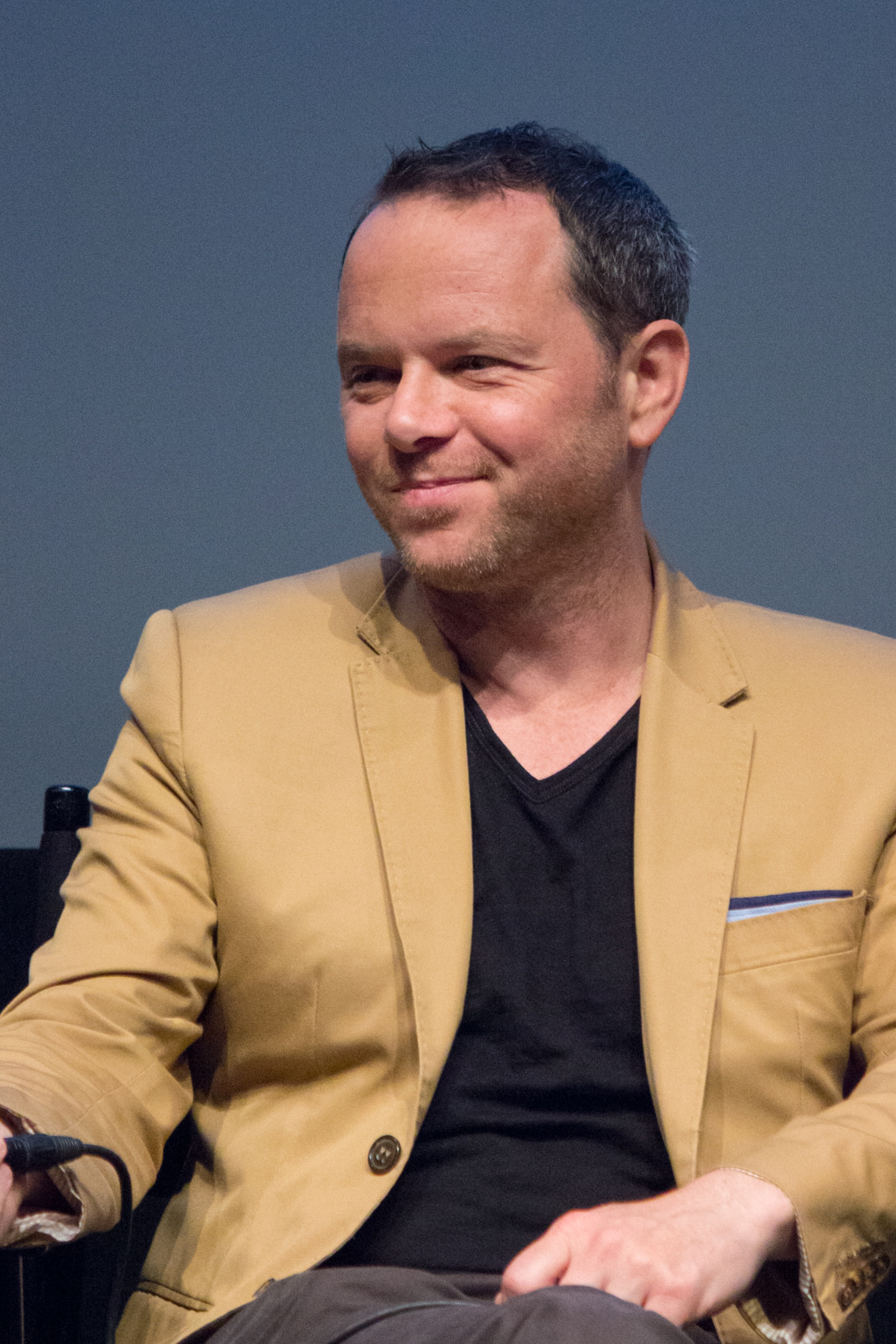
Showrunner Noah Hawley chose to develop Legion due to the character's mental illness and the potential to create an unconventional superhero series.

Hawley first developed the idea of a series about Haller with Kinberg, after asking the question "is there an interesting show in this genre, and is there a character in that show?" He noted that series such as Marvel's Netflix shows and Preacher had not been released at that point. Hawley was specifically interested in exploring the character of David Haller because of his mental illness, and for the potential of the series to depict his unique mindset. He pitched the series as "a deconstruction of a villain ... and a love story".

Hawley's first thought when "looking at the genre is if we remove the genre, is there a compelling show you want to watch there?" He decided to center the series on the "idea of this epic love story and then putting the genre back into it" and layering elements such as mental illness and special abilities on that foundation Hawley's initial script for Legion was described by Donner as "less fractured", "cohesive [and] much more regular." However, he quickly reconceived the series "and decided more Eternal Sunshine of the Spotless Mind, Terrence Malick, more whimsy, more impressionistic and went in that direction." This was in part due to Hawley's desire to depict a "more existential exploration" and a "surreal or dreamlike quality where it's not just about running and kicking." He was inspired by the works of David Lynch to have the series' structure reflect the content of the story. Explaining, Hawley noted that the series' protagonist "doesn't know what's real and what's not real, [so] the audience should have the same experience". Hawley added that "there is this Alice in Wonderland quality to it, of a story within a story." To acclimatize audiences to the different style of the series, taking into consideration that the show was given a late airtime and so "it's on at the end of their very long day", Hawley had several of the early episodes begin with a "hypnotic quality ... often [with] a little ethereal voice-over, to give the sense that we are not rooted in a physical time and place." The intent was to put audiences "in the state of mind to watch Legion."

Discussing the increasing popularity of unreliable narrators in television, Hawley said that he did not want the audience thinking that the series is a puzzle that needs to be solved, saying, "We're going to take a character out of confusion into clarity and an audience out of mystery into clarity"; this is seen in the season's latter episodes, which are more narratively straightforward after Haller becomes "clear on what's going on [and] we are as well." A noted sequence in the season's penultimate episode sees Haller explain the series' backstory and events to himself (and the audience)—Haller was institutionalized not because of his abilities, but because his mind had been infected by the Shadow King. Hawley wanted to indicate to the audience that this would be the only sequence in the series so exposition heavy, and so it features Haller creating a class room environment within his mind to make the teaching purpose of the scene explicit.

Hawley did not want the audience to get to the end of the first run and have "no resolution of any kind", and felt that by creating a complete story with a clear ending related to Haller's conflict with the Shadow King, audiences who were confused by the show's complicated narrative would be able to "feel like they got it through the coherent story." Hawley plotted this story out to take only "eight hours", which is why he asked FX for a shorter first season of eight episodes. Hawley noted that the characters' conflict is a metaphor for an internal struggle, given the Shadow King's position as a parasite within Haller's mind. He was also more interested in setting up a longer-running rivalry than having the antagonist be a "villain-of-the-year", and so the season leaves the character to be an external threat to Haller in the second season.

=== Casting ===
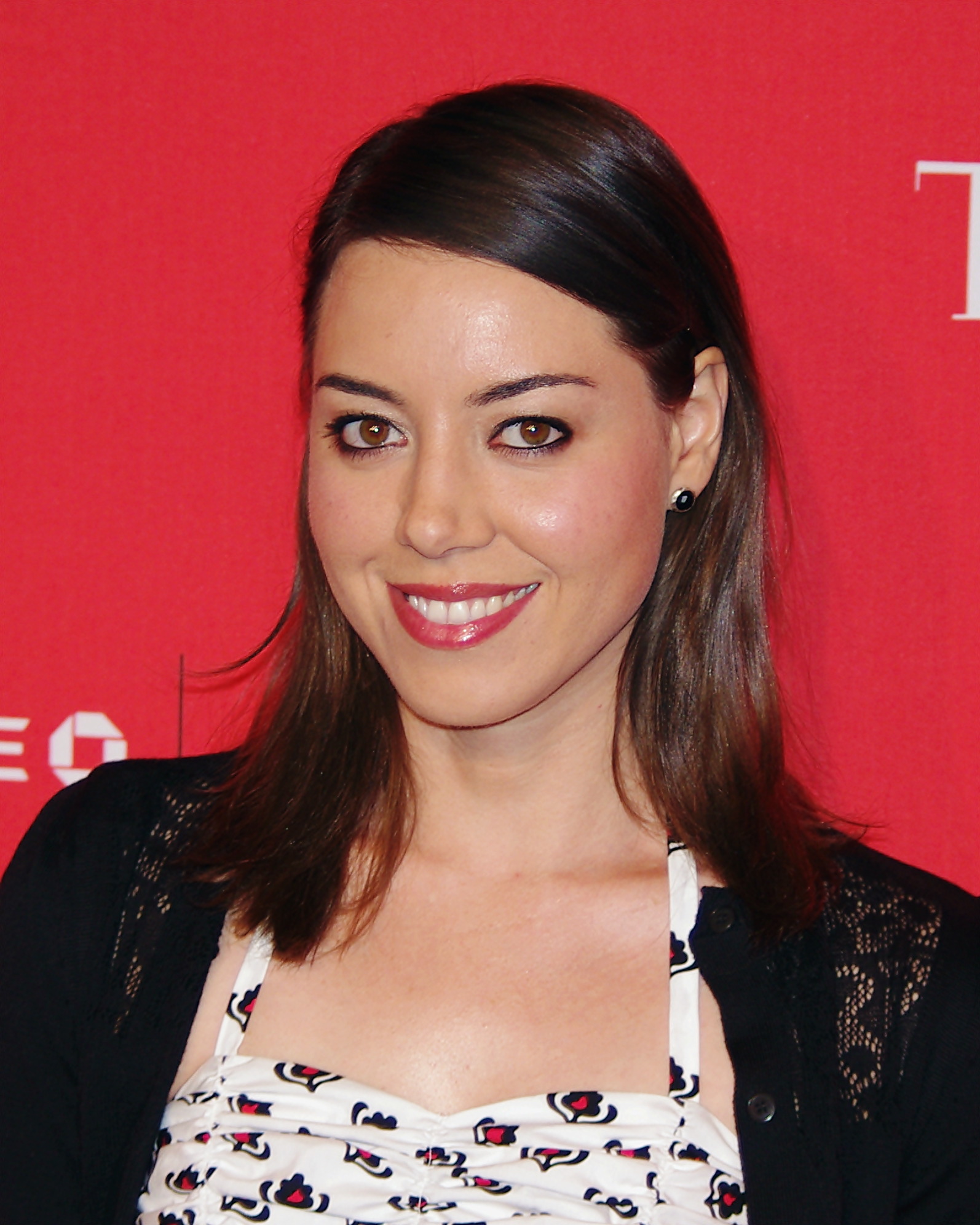
Aubrey Plaza's character dies in the first episode, but returns as one form of the Shadow King, a villainous mutant.

The main cast for the season includes Dan Stevens as David Haller, Rachel Keller as Sydney "Syd" Barrett, Aubrey Plaza as Lenny Busker, Bill Irwin as Cary Loudermilk, Jeremie Harris as Ptonomy Wallace, Amber Midthunder as Kerry Loudermilk, Katie Aselton as Amy Haller, and Jean Smart as Melanie Bird. Several members of the cast noted that they joined the series due to Hawley's involvement. Unlike the rest of the cast, Irwin's Cary Loudermilk is not introduced until the second episode. Hawley had sought to cast Irwin during filming on the pilot, before the character's role had been written, and "had to pitch him the weird, crazy character dynamic and that the show is about memory and identity". Irwin agreed to join the project based on this conversation.

Plaza initially met with Hawley for the female lead role of Syd Barrett, but Hawley instead asked her to portray the character of Lenny, who in the script was a man that dies by the end of the first episode. Plaza insisted that the character's dialogue not be changed for her, instead choosing to play the character as both male and female. This led to Busker "making crass remarks about women and muttering vintage phrases". In regards to the character's death, Hawley promised Plaza that "Lenny would be going on a very, very interesting journey." The character begins appearing as an apparition in Haller's mind, with Plaza saying that "Lenny is very important to David's story." In "Chapter 7", this apparition is revealed to be one form of the powerful mutant Amahl Farouk / Shadow King. Other forms that the character takes on in David's mind include the Devil with the Yellow Eyes, portrayed by Quinton Boisclair; the Angry Boy, a manifestation of the title character from the book The World's Angriest Boy in the World, portrayed by stunt woman Devyn Dalton; and King, David's childhood dog.

Hawley announced in October 2016 that Jemaine Clement would be joining the series in what was described as "a multi-episode arc", later revealed to be portraying Oliver Bird, Melanie's husband. In February 2017, David Selby announced that he would appear in 3 episodes of the season. He portrays Brubaker, a member of Division 3. Also, Ellie Araiza was cast in the recurring role of Philly, Haller's previous girlfriend. Other recurring actors in the show include Hamish Linklater as Clark, an interrogator for Division 3; Brad Mann as mutant fighter Rudy; Mackenzie Gray as Walter / The Eye; and Scott Lawrence as psychiatrist Henry Poole.

=== Design ===
Production designer Michael Wylie, who had previously worked on Marvel Television's Agent Carter, found designing for Legion to be more flexible than other series, due to the lack of set continuity from scene to scene, though Hawley was very specific about his ideas for the series, and provided Wylie with a 'lookbook' for the show when first interviewing him for the job. To avoid dating the series, elements such as cars are rarely shown, and when they are seen there is a mixture of modern-day cars and vehicles from the 60s. Clothing is also a mixture of present-day and past fashions, emulating a prediction of the future from the 60s or 70s. Wylie explained that the "story is being told from an unreliable narrator so we can do whatever we want." Visual inspiration was taken from the works of Stanley Kubrick, including A Clockwork Orange and 2001: A Space Odyssey.

Elaborating on the series' costumes, Carol Case, who also served as costume designer on Fargo, explained that she "didn't want anyone to be too locked into that 60s feel, because we were ultimately going for a 'no period' look." Case took the series' color palette from "60s rock bands—the golds and yellows and oranges and greens ... Noah said he wanted it to look like David was rescued by The Kinks". She then assigned colors from that palette to each lead character: Barrett wears orange and black; Carry and Kerry Loudermilk wear mostly navy and tan; Melanie Bird wear beige and pastel colors to "convey her role as a caretaker"; and Haller wears different blues and greys, though his palette was "more open than others', given that his character is a bit of a work in progress." Case sourced clothing from various vintage stores, but created other pieces from scratch, including all of the costumes worn by Katie Aselton which "are more deeply rooted in the Swinging Sixties aesthetic than others." The pink beanies worn by members of Division 3 were knitted by Case's sister and her friends for the series. Case deliberately avoided referencing any costumes from the comics "to take this story out of where people think it sits". For the patients of Clockworks Psychiatric Hospital, Case initially used "a bunch of space-age-y looks that didn't feel right", before settling on tracksuits with exaggerated collars to give them a "futuristic feel". The orange tracksuits include colored stripes to indicate the seriousness of each patient's diagnosis, ranging from white stripes for Barrett ("which puts her in the 'least crazy' category"), to yellow stripes for "moderate" Haller, and red stripes for Busker which "basically means she's never getting out of there." Busker's costumes evolve throughout the series to reflect her changing role, going from the orange and red focus to black and "businessy" clothes to show that "She's got a job to do, and she's determined to do it." Her design then become "unhinged"; eventually she wears a twizzler as a collar bar, after being seen eating them throughout the season.

The children's book The World's Angriest Boy in the World, which appears in Haller's memories of his childhood, was written by Hawley and published for use in the show. Stevens described it as "the world's most twisted children's book", but useful for him to hold and read while acting. The physical manifestation of the book's title character was inspired by Edward Gorey drawings, with Wylie explaining that he "loved the idea of him wearing a little velvet, Eddie Munster child's funeral suit. That's where that dude came from. He's really scary." Another manifestation of the Shadow King, the Devil with the Yellow Eyes, was inspired by the reality television series My 600-lb Life, with Wylie explaining, "They do this amazing thing at the beginning of every episode of that show where they show the person struggling to get out of bed or walk down a hallway ... They light it badly just to make the person's journey seem that much more difficult." Boisclair was cast in the role due to his 6 ft 8 in (2.03 m) height and slender frame, with prosthetics used to give him a "gigantic body with no neck [that contrasts with his] really skinny arms and legs". Boisclair was called a "rare and lucky find", akin to Bolaji Badejo, who portrayed the alien in the 1979 film Alien. Boisclair's prosthetics were designed by Sarah Pickersgill, under special effects makeup head Todd Masters, and took four-and-a-half hours to apply. Masters' team were also responsible for creating the body parts that are found sticking out of walls in the pilot, including Lenny's upper body and arm, produced from a silicone copy of Plaza; extensive bruising for Cary and Kerry Loudermilk after a major fight sequence, which was achieved with Pros-Aide transfers that were reduced each day to show the wounds healing; and the burn makeup for Linklater after he is injured in the pilot, which was designed to cover half his face and most of his chest and back, with just the face and neck requiring five separate prosthetics. Marcine Peter at Contour Contact Lens provided hand-painted contact lenses for the production, including for Boisclair to wear as the Devil with the Yellow Eyes.

Several props from the X-Men films were brought to Vancouver for use in the series, from storage in the United States and Montreal (where the films are produced). Wylie was free to use these as he wished, with the series' mantra allowing him to "do something because you think it's cool, or that it's pretty". One such prop was Charles Xavier's wheelchair, with the series' production free to choose any version from throughout the film franchise; they settled on the prop used by James McAvoy in X-Men: Apocalypse.

=== Filming ===
Filming for the pilot began in March, in Vancouver, under the working title Clubhouse. Hawley directed the episode, with Dana Gonzales serving as cinematographer. Gonzales referenced Kubrick, Malick, and Paolo Sorrentino as influences on the filming style of the show, and said it was "more about building from the ground up than leveraging the look of [the Marvel] universe", with Gonzales not having seen any of the X-Men films. With the series order, the rest of the first season was set to start filming in August 2016, also in Vancouver. Gonzales served as cinematographer on another four episodes of the season, with Craig Wrobleski taking on the role for the other three episode. Both cinematographers previously worked with Hawley on Fargo. Filming for the season was completed by the end of November 2016.

Legion was filmed with Arri Alexa cameras, with two Alexa XT cameras and an Alexa Mini used for the pilot and then Minis used for the rest of the season; the footage was captured in 4K Ultra-high-definition. Gonzales described the series as "essentially a one-camera show", but "if we can get a bonus view [with a second camera] that doesn't compromise the look of A-camera, that's great." Lenses for the series were a mixture of spherical and anamorphic, including a 9.8 Kinoptik camera lens to film "some of the more bizarre mindscapes", which Kubrick used to film A Clockwork Orange. The Kinoptik lenses caused vignetting, which Gonzales would crop out of the image in post-production, though sometimes "we just left it" to add character. The series changes aspect ratio to reflect Haller's state of mind, "going narrower when he feels boxed in by the nefarious forces pursuing him", though Gonzales "didn't always want the anamorphics to make the audience feel this big jump, but I wanted these subtle differences like the background bokeh to be a little different." The season's "memory work" sequences were filmed with anamorphic lenses, but were then cropped to a 16:9 aspect ratio. Gonzales and Hawley both "don't care too much for" steadicams, and instead relied on jib arms, dollies, and 30-foot technocranes, both on set and location. The production also made extensive use of a Ronin camera stabilizer, allowing the camera to be moved around by camera men and transitioned between hand use and cranes without endangering the camera operators.

"It's a hard show to make on a TV schedule. There are a lot of elements, not just CG ... you're not just setting up a camera with two people talking. We're trying to tell the story with the camera and the visuals. I trained a lot of the crew on Fargo, so we're ambitious."

— Hawley on his approach to Legion's visual storytelling.

An unusually large amount of in-camera effects were used for the pilot in place of computer generated imagery, including "upside-down day"; shots of Haller using his abilities, where multiple takes of debris were filmed in controlled camera movements and then overlaid on shots of Stevens acting on his own; a montage that appears as a single camera movement, pulling "back in slow motion as we see David Haller's childhood progress"; and a one-shot action sequence—actually filmed in two shots that were later connected with visual effects—that saw the camera mounted on a cable and run down a hill side. Hawley admitted that it would be a challenge for the series' other directors to maintain this quality of visuals with much less time to film each episode: Hawley had 21 days to film the pilot, but the subsequent episodes were only scheduled 8 days of filming each. Some of these shoots ultimately had to be extended to 10 or 11 days filming to meet Hawley's vision, which he said were "not good calls to have but what are you going to do? It's a huge show." Keller felt that each episode in the season was noticeably different from the others, calling the series a uniquely "director-driven show. It's almost like the episode prior doesn't set you up for how the next episode is going to go."

Hawley noted that many US television series are filmed in Vancouver, and it "offers an amazing array of looks and feels and, obviously, a great crew base and everything." Sets for the series were constructed in a former supermarket warehouse in Burnaby, including a "23,000-square-foot set" for the interior of Clockworks Mental Hospital. Wylie called this the most complicated set, and felt "trying to make a hospital feel fun is a perfect challenge." The most difficult set for Wylie to create was the ice room inhabited by Oliver Bird in the astral plane, which he had to create in seven days. Wylie initially looked to have the set built by "those people who make giant sheets of ice for ice sculptures and stuff", before eventually building the set out of visqueen. However, this did not work, and was a "gigantic disappointment". Wylie had the set rebuilt within a week, with the second version using acrylic molded to look like thick sheets of ice. Another notable set featured a giant volume knob which Haller turns to "control the volume of the voices he hears in his head". This was compared to the effects of films like Honey, I Shrunk the Kids and The Incredible Shrinking Man, and described by Gonzales as "classic Noah Hawley". The sequence was filmed at the end of production on the season, and added to the second episode. All of Wylie's sets were built with "external lighting features" that could be controlled from a board, allowing the cinematographers to be flexible with lighting "given that the reality of a location can change drastically depending on our main character's perceptions and actions."

=== Music ===
Composer Jeff Russo felt that "the important part is allowing the humanity of these characters to really shine through", and in addition to an orchestra he used "a bunch of old synthesizers" and "a lot of interesting sound design" to represent the "otherworldly" elements of the series. Russo specifically found a Synthi AKS synthesizer for the show, as that instrument was used during the making of Pink Floyd's The Dark Side of the Moon, one of Hawley's favorite albums and what Russo described as "the sound of schizophrenia, the sound of mental illness in the '70s. So why not use that as the touchstone for what the sound of this score might be?" Russo experimented with the instrument, and began "recording and writing melodies around its unusual sounds."

With the season's premiere, Russo reiterated that the "through-line" of the series is the relationship between Haller and Barrett, and said that a love story "lends itself to musical moments. It allows it to underscore the character." To support the series' unreliable narrative, Russo tried to write music that would push the audience "off balance", which included "a lot of dissonance, and a lot of key changes that are subtle so you don't really recognize that it's a key change. I go from playing with a synthesizer, and then I morph that into playing the same piece of music with the orchestra, but in an adjusted key." Russo also looked to a variety of instruments and sounds for the show, such as orchestral and quartet effects that he called "left of center"; violin bows on bed springs and other metal objects; a solo harpsichord for the finale's opening sequence; and an electronic version of Maurice Ravel's "Boléro" for "Chapter 7" that was merged with a classical recording of the piece to create what Russo referred to as "Fauxlero".

A soundtrack album for the season featuring Russo's score was released digitally on February 24, 2017, on Amazon.com. A CD release followed on March 24, from Lakeshore Records, with a vinyl release also planned for the album. All music by Jeff Russo:

Legion (Original Television Series Soundtrack)
No.	Title	Length
1.	"Young David"	5:05
2.	"David in Clockworks"	0:46
3.	"174 Hours"	8:47
4.	"Seeing Things Hearing Things"	4:52
5.	"Run"	0:50
6.	"David"	6:31
7.	"The Shift and Cascade"	4:51
8.	"The Caper 2"	3:28
9.	"Legion Main Title"	1:27
10.	"87 Days"	8:33
11.	"Open"	3:10
12.	"Almost Legion"	4:10
13.	"Levitate"	2:29
14.	"Clockworks"	0:56
15.	"Chaos and Madness"	2:34
16.	"David and Syd"	3:11
17.	"Choir and Crickets"	2:20
18.	"Tea and Memory"	1:59
19.	"David Redux"	3:53
20.	"Darkness" (full suite)	5:00

A second album for the season was released by Lakeshore Records on June 9, featuring more of Russo's score. The release also included Russo's "Fauxlero" version of "Boléro", and a cover of "Rainbow Connection" from The Muppet Movie performed by Stevens on a banjo. All music by Jeff Russo, except where noted:

Legion, Volume 2 (Original Television Series Soundtrack)
No.	Title	Artist	Length
1.	"Caper 1"		2:35
2.	"Chasing David"		1:32
3.	"First Entry into Clockworks"		1:03
4.	"Harpsichord with Undercurrent"		6:52
5.	"Main Title Music Box"		1:09
6.	"Springs"		3:09
7.	"The Cube"		2:58
8.	"The Walk"		0:54
9.	"Fauxlero (Bolero De Revel)"	feat. Paco Rodrigo	6:44
10.	"Rainbow Connection"	Dan Stevens	1:29

Russo was not involved in the selection of the sourced songs used throughout the show, with Hawley already knowing the songs he wanted to use and working with music supervisor Maggie Phillips to get the license for them. With the influence of Pink Floyd's music on both Hawley and Russo, Hawley wanted to use their music in the season's finale, as Phillips noted it "never quite fit in the other episodes". He chose the songs "Breathe" and "On the Run", as "they flow into each other on the record. There's no pause in between those songs. So there was no way to go with just one song." This posed an issue with the series' budget that became the hardest licensing struggle for the series. Phillips described "an extremely difficult negotiation process, but we were working with some great people that recognized what we were doing was interesting. We ended up getting a price that we were able to persuade FX was worth it. But, it took months." The songs were confirmed on the day of the final sound mix for the show. In case the songs could not have been secured, Hawley asked Phillips to choose an alternative from the works of The Flaming Lips. Phillips said she was "not a huge fan of Flaming Lips, but I listened to every single song they've ever done". They ultimately decided that none of the songs would work for the sequence, so Russo composed original music to replace the Pink Floyd songs if necessary.

Lakeshore Records also maintains a digital playlist on music streaming service Spotify that, in addition to Russo's original music, collects several of the preexisting songs heard throughout the season. These additional songs include:

Legion Expanded Playlist – Music From the TV Series
No.	Title	Artist	Length
1.	"Masala Fair"	The Scene	2:43
2.	"Never My Love"	The Association	3:13
3.	"Happy Jack"	The Who	2:12
4.	"She's a Rainbow"	The Rolling Stones	4:11
5.	"Up the Beach"	Jane's Addiction	3:01
6.	"Pauvre Lola"	Serge Gainsbourg	2:31
7.	"Hyperactive!"	Thomas Dolby	4:13
8.	"Undiscovered First"	Feist	4:58
9.	"Don't Say Goodbye"	Johnny Woodson	2:17
10.	"Complexity"	Stewart Winter & Joe Saba	1:29
11.	"Road to Nowhere"	Talking Heads	4:27
12.	"Monkey"	Robert Plant	4:57
13.	"Metamorphosis"	Sonny Simmons	11:51
14.	"The Daily Mail"	Radiohead	3:37
15.	"Feeling Good"	Nina Simone and Bassnectar	3:46
16.	"Boléro"	Maurice Ravel	15:59
17.	"Art of Fear"	The Grassy Knoll	2:59
18.	"Children of the Revolution"	T. Rex	2:30

=== Visual effects ===
Hawley also brought his visual effects supervisor John Ross from Fargo. Ross coordinated multiple visual effects vendors for Legion, which he described as "a bit of a crapshoot" because artists were often not able to work on the same shot week-to-week. He noted that though "hundreds of thousands of dollars" was spent on major visual effect sequences for the show, "we don't dwell on that aspect. There's a jeep that gets slammed down [in the pilot], which the characters hide behind before it gets flung back into the building, but we pan off it, just throwing it away, because the destruction isn't the point of the scene." He compared this mindset to M. Night Shyamalan's approach to superpowers in Unbreakable. When realizing characters' special abilities, Ross said it "comes down to tying this fantastic beam coming out to somebody's hand, and showing how it lights up a face and distorts the air as it travels across frame. We want it to look as much like a live interactive element as we can imagine it to be."

Ross was impressed with the in-camera effects achieved for the series, but he would always propose visual effect alternatives to these on set because "you have to embrace what VFX can do for you. The cost of spending half a day on a special scene has got to be worth it, or else you can just shoot a plate and do the rest in post and save yourself all that production time". Ross photographed all the series' sets as reference footage to work from in case a visual effect shot was ultimately required, explaining, "Sometimes while looking at the assembly I'll realize we need another shot but there isn't any coverage that works. [The reference stills give] us a starting point for building our new shots. And whether they are all-CG or just elements, we are always dealing with Noah's aesthetic of making it look as real as possible."

=== Shared universe connections ===
In August 2016, Singer said that Legion had been designed to fit into the X-Men universe, but also to stand alone, so "you wouldn't have to label" the relationship between the series and the films. Hawley explained that because the series is depicting the title character's "subjective reality", it would not have to address any connections to the films straight away, noting that his series Fargo, which is connected to the 1996 film of the same name, at first "had to stand on its own feet" before exploring those connections more; "We have to earn the right to be part of this universe. My hope is we create something so strong that the people in the movie studio call and say they would be foolish enough not to connect these things." He did state that "you can't tell this story without" acknowledging that Legion is the son of Charles Xavier, who appears in the films. This acknowledgement comes in "Chapter 7", with the appearance of Xavier's signature wheelchair in one of Haller's memories. Hawley explained that Haller would look to learn more of his father in future seasons, with Xavier potentially making a physical appearance in the series at that point.

== Release ==
=== Broadcast ===
Legion's first season premiered on FX on February 8, 2017, and concluded after eight episodes on March 29. In January 2016, Landgraf had said that he anticipated the series "would go on air" later that year, but that May, FX announced that the series would actually debut in early 2017. The next month, Marvel announced that Fox channels in over 125 countries had picked up their respective airing rights for the series, and that it would be aired using a "day-and-date" delivery system so that viewers around the world get the series on the same day. Fox Networks Group's sales division would also handle distribution of the series to third parties.

=== Marketing ===
At San Diego Comic-Con 2016, Marvel's Chief Creative Officer Joe Quesada debuted the first trailer for Legion at his "Cup O'Joe" panel. Response to the trailer was positive, particularly its unique tone and visuals. Jacob Kastrenakes of The Verge described the trailer as eclectic, while Daniel Kreps of Rolling Stone called it manic. Kelly West at CinemaBlend called the trailer "all kinds of weird... in a good way", and positively compared it to a mix of Fight Club, Mr. Robot, and The Matrix. At New York Comic-Con later that year, the series held its own panel. Hawley, Loeb, Donner, and the series' main cast members were present to promote the series and screen the first half of the pilot episode. In response to the footage, Deadline Hollywood's Dominic Patten said "we know three things for sure about Legion, it looks great, has top notch pacing and a killer choice of music." Nick Romano, recapping the panel for Entertainment Weekly, called the footage "just as chaotic as the mind of David Haller" and "almost Kubrickian in nature". "Based on what was screened," Romano added, "Legion already seems to have an erratic, hallucinatory tone and style that we've never seen before from a superhero TV series."

Michael Murphy's Suspension of Disbelief sculpture, displayed at the Legion Where?House art exhibit, forms the word "Legion" from hundreds of colorful objects hung from the ceiling

The series premiered at a red carpet event on January 26, 2017, in West Hollywood's Pacific Design Center. It was received enthusiastically by the audience, including Legion creator Bill Sienkiewicz. This was followed by an "immersive art exhibit" named Legion Where?House. Running for three days from the premiere in a Williamsburg warehouse, the free-to-the-public exhibit featured artwork from Michael Murphy, Clemens Behr, Kumi Yamashita, and David Flores that looked to "challenge audiences' minds": Murphy's sculpture, Suspension of Disbelief, features "hundreds of colorful utilitarian objects" hung from the ceiling that, when looked at from a specific spot, form the word "Legion"; Behr's installation, Doors, is "the corridor of a hospital that's been blown apart", allowing visitors to walk "between fragments of rooms and doorways strewn with mirror fragments"; Yamashita created Lovers, silhouettes of David Haller and Syd Barrett that are separated, "preventing the figures from clasping hands", which "greets visitors at the show's entrance"; and Flores' mural Legion, "being used as the key art for the show, depicts a fiery explosion emanating from David's mind." Limited edition posters inspired by this artwork were made available at 56 comic book stores across the U.S. The exhibit also included a multimedia installation inspired by the series.

Additionally, five augmented reality (AR) murals were displayed as promotion for the series, one each in Manhattan, Brooklyn, Chicago, Los Angeles, and San Francisco. Visitors to these sites could use the Blippar AR app to make the artwork "come to life", displaying "the power of David Haller's mind". In London, the Century Club hosted a cocktail bar on February 8 named The Mutant Lounge. Taking place over two, two-hour sessions, the event was staffed by "mutants with superpowers", decorated to "recreate the world depicted in the series", and served themed cocktails and canapes. Visitors could watch the series' premiere before its debut in the UK, and were "treated to a number of surprises throughout the evening, with the aim of demonstrating that not everything is as it seems."

=== Home media ===
In September 2017, the complete season was made available on the FX+ online streaming service, accessible to customers of Cox On Demand, Xfinity On Demand, and the FX Now app. On October 2, the season was released on DVD and Blu-ray for Region 2, including all eight episodes, deleted scenes, and making-of featurettes. It received a similar release for Region 4 on November 22. The season was released in Region 1 on DVD and Blu-ray on March 27, 2018.

== Reception ==
=== Ratings ===
Viewership and ratings per episode of Legion season 1
No.	Title	Air date	Rating (18–49)	Viewers (millions)	DVR (18–49)	DVR viewers (millions)	Total (18–49)	Total viewers (millions)
1	"Chapter 1"	February 8, 2017	0.7	1.622	0.9	1.97	1.6	3.59
2	"Chapter 2"	February 15, 2017	0.5	1.133	0.8	1.78	1.3	2.91
3	"Chapter 3"	February 22, 2017	0.5	1.043	0.7	1.45	1.2	2.49
4	"Chapter 4"	March 1, 2017	0.4	0.750	—N/a	—N/a	—N/a	—N/a
5	"Chapter 5"	March 8, 2017	0.4	0.795	0.7	1.40	1.1	2.19
6	"Chapter 6"	March 15, 2017	0.3	0.732	0.7	1.38	1.0	2.11
7	"Chapter 7"	March 22, 2017	0.4	0.716	0.6	1.33	1.0	2.04
8	"Chapter 8"	March 29, 2017	0.4	0.812	0.6	1.20	1.0	2.01

The premiere's initial ratings were described as "OK, not great", in line with other cable series debuts, but lower than other high-profile FX debuts such as American Crime Story and Hawley's own Fargo. With the increase in viewership from encore showings and delayed viewing, the season was described as being "off to a good start". It ultimately surpassed the total viewership for the higher-profile premiere of FX's Taboo. By the end of the season, the show's ratings were described as "steady" and "fairly solid".

=== Critical response ===
The review aggregator website Rotten Tomatoes reported a 90% approval rating with an average rating of 8.45/10 based on 239 reviews. The website's critical consensus reads, "Bold, intelligent, and visually arresting, Legion is a masterfully surreal and brilliantly daring departure from traditional superhero conceits." Metacritic, which uses a weighted average, assigned a score of 82 out of 100 based on 40 critics, indicating what the website considers to be "universal acclaim".

Legion season 1: Critical reception by episode
Season 1 (2017): Percentage of positive critics' reviews tracked by the website Rotten Tomatoes

James Poniewozik of The New York Times called the series "sharply written, but its visual panache is the big surprise", praising the "groovy, 1960s-70s retro-futuristic look" and soundtrack. He concluded, "You will not always know what's real in Legion, but the thrills are 100 percent genuine." Writing for The Guardian, Emily Zemler said that Hawley's representation of Haller's perspective on reality was "the strength of Legion ... It's disjointed on purpose, and there's something deeply satisfying in the edge that gives the viewer. It's not a comfortable watch, but it doesn't need to be." Zemler did warn that the series may be disorienting for viewers with no context or knowledge of the character's comic origins.

David Bianco, reviewing the series' early episodes for USA Today, found the show's villains to be its weakest link, instead praising Stevens, Keller, and Smart. He said it "may initially seem confusing and frustrating [but] if any show deserves your patience, it's Legion. Rewards await." In his review on RogerEbert.com, Brian Tallerico praised the series for its focus on character, especially by having none of its characters "defined by their powers or their relation to a villain". He felt that the performances of Stevens and Keller were especially strong, but did think that the series took itself too seriously at times, lacking some of the humor usually found in the works of Hawley and Marvel. David Wiegand for the San Francisco Chronicle called Legion the best series of the new year, and praised the "resolutely novelistic" approach from Hawley. He found it "facile" to call Legion "a comic book show for people who don't like comic book shows. [It has] a far more complex thematic and psychological structure than most comic book shows." He praised the cast, especially Stevens, who he said "simply does the best work of his career".

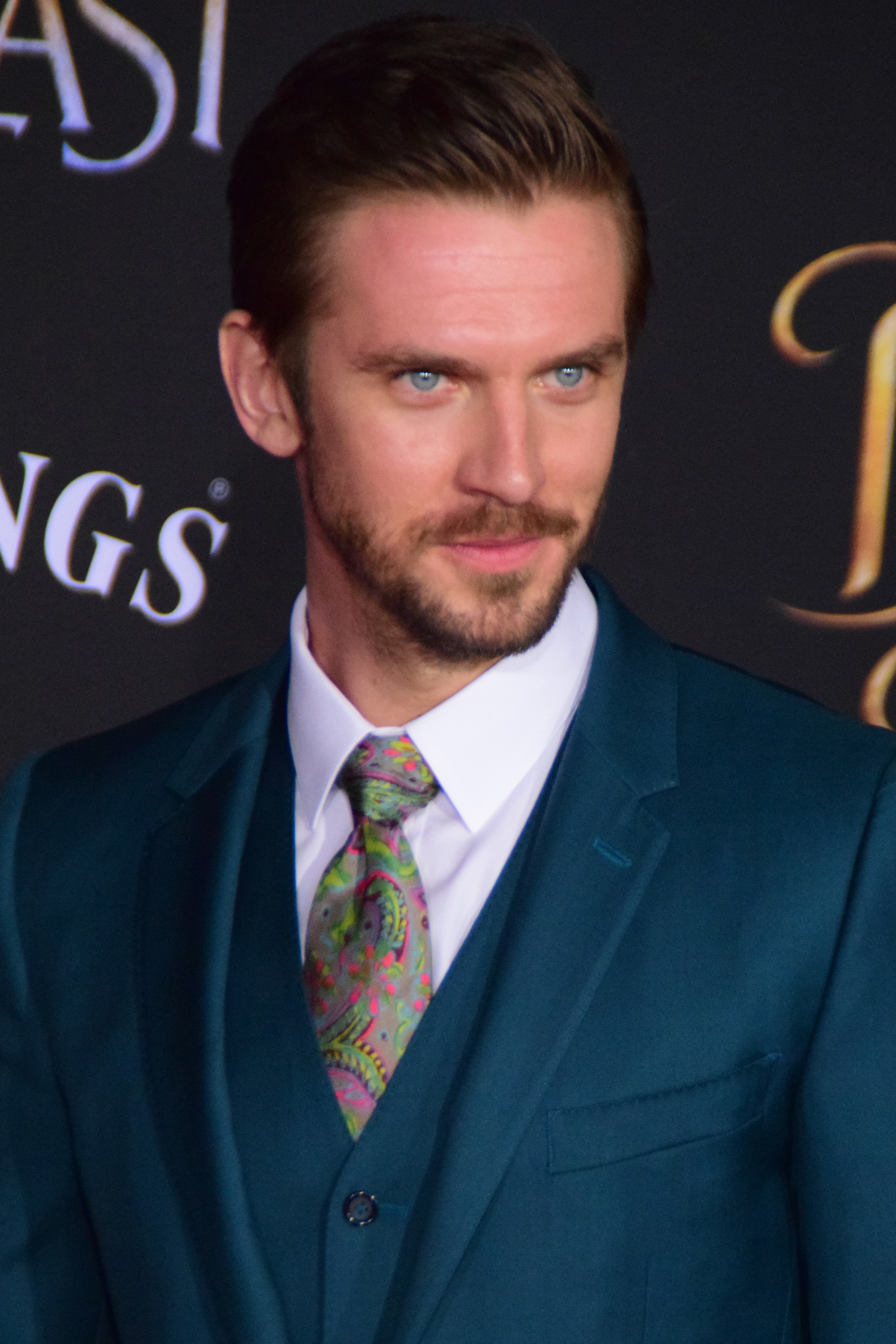
Dan Stevens received praise for his performance as the title character

IndieWire's Ben Travers praised Legion as "the most intricate, intimate superhero story to date", highlighting its focus on "an emotional journey for our leading lad", the central love story that turns the show "from a 12 Monkeys mind-fuck to a Romeo & Juliet romance at the drop of a hat", and its cast. At Variety, Maureen Ryan stated that Stevens' performance "is the glue that keeps Legion from flying apart", and the relationship between Haller and Barrett provides "moments of solace in a viewing experience that can otherwise be exceptionally intense." After the first three episodes, Ryan said that "the challenge of Legion will be to make David's quest for wholeness more than the sum of its flashy and often captivating parts. But the humane core of the drama offers a reason to hope for the best." Tim Goodman of The Hollywood Reporter said, "It might seem weird to have a Marvel show on FX, or to have it star that upper-crust Brit from Downton Abbey, filtered through the creator of Fargo, but somehow it all works." He praised Stevens performance, and Hawley's "optical hijinks" even after the first episode, where the story starts to become more clear.

Writing for Slate, Sam Adams stated that Hawley's intention to deconstruct the superhero genre "doesn't seem like an accurate description of what the series is doing, or even trying to do", calling the series "a well-appointed show: It's handsomely shot, and smartly acted, and ingeniously constructed enough to suggest there's something mind-blowing lurking at its center ... [but] it starts to feel like a show with a Rubik's cube where its heart should be." David Sims at The Atlantic called Legion "the latest, and most indulgent, entrant" in a trend of "shows that rely far less on plot than on mood, that are crammed with stunning visuals and frustrating, circular dialogue." Sims praised the series' style and Stevens' performance, but felt that "it tries so hard to dazzle that it forgets to tell a meaningful story." The Washington Post's Hank Stuever also questioned the need for another series where "viewers find themselves trapped in the center of a tortured mind". Stuever had mixed feelings for the show overall, calling it "beautifully made" but asking, "Must it always be the viewer's job to pick up the pieces?"

=== Accolades ===
Legion was named on multiple best/top television series lists for 2017, including by io9 (2nd), Kareem Abdul-Jabbar for The Hollywood Reporter (9th), and unranked by the Los Angeles Times, and the San Francisco Chronicle. It was also named on multiple lists for best/top new series of 2017, including by Mashable (6th), and Deadline Hollywood (8th, tied with Big Little Lies), as well as unranked by Vanity Fair. Additionally, in mid-2017, Legion was named one of the best television series of the year so far by Nerdist, and one of the best new series of the year so far by IndieWire (7th) and unranked by CinemaBlend. Collider ranked it as the best superhero series of the year.

Year	Award	Category	Recipient	Result	Ref.
2017	TVLine's Performer of the Week	Performance in "Chapter 6"	Aubrey Plaza	Won	
2017	Golden Trailer Awards	Best Sound Editing (TV Spot/Trailer/Teaser for a series)	Legion	Won	
2017	Saturn Awards	Best Superhero Adaptation Television Series	Legion	Nominated	
2017	Camerimage International Film Festival	First Look – TV Pilots Competition	Dana Gonzales for "Chapter 1"	Nominated	
2017	IGN's Best of 2017 Awards	TV series of the year	Legion	Nominated	
2017	IGN's Best of 2017 Awards	Best New Series	Legion	People's Choice	
2017	IGN's Best of 2017 Awards	Best Action Series	Legion	Tied Runner-Up	
2017	IGN's Best of 2017 Awards	Best Dramatic TV Performance	Dan Stevens	Nominated	
2018	Satellite Awards	Best Television Series – Genre	Legion	Nominated	
2018	ASC Awards	Outstanding Achievement in Cinematography in Regular Series for Commercial Television	Dana Gonzales for "Chapter 1"	Nominated	
2018	Visual Effects Society Awards	Outstanding Visual Effects in a Photoreal Episode	John Ross, Eddie Bonin, Sebastian Bergeron, Lionel Lim, Paul Benjamin for "Chapter 1"	Nominated	
2018	Empire Awards	Best TV Actor	Dan Stevens	Nominated	
2018	GLAAD Media Awards	Outstanding Individual Episode (in a series without a regular LGBTQ character)	"Chapter 8"	Nominated	
2018	Peabody Awards	Entertainment	Legion	Nominated	
