= Chapter 6 (Legion) =

- Legion episode
- Episode no.: Season 1 Episode 6
- Directed by: Hiro Murai
- Written by: Nathaniel Halpern
- Cinematography by: Craig Wrobleski
- Editing by: Curtis Thurber
- Production code: XLN01006
- Original air date: March 15, 2017
- Running time: 52 minutes

Episode chronology
← Previous "Chapter 5"	Next → "Chapter 7"
- Legion season 1

"Chapter 6" is the sixth episode of the first season of the American surrealist superhero thriller television series Legion, based on the Marvel Comics character of the same name. The episode was written by co-producer Nathaniel Halpern and directed by Hiro Murai. It originally aired on FX on March 15, 2017.

The series follows David Haller, a "mutant" diagnosed with schizophrenia at a young age, as he tries to control his psychic powers and combat the sinister forces trying to control him. In the episode, the team finds itself as patients of the Clockworks Psychiatric Hospital hallucination, with Lenny acting as their therapist.

According to Nielsen Media Research, the episode was seen by an estimated 0.732 million household viewers and gained a 0.3 ratings share among adults aged 18–49. The episode received mixed reviews from critics, who praised Murai's directing and Aubrey Plaza's performance, but criticized the pacing, lack of progress and character development.

== Plot ==
In the Clockworks hallucination, Lenny acts as a psychiatrist to the team, convincing them to open up more about their problems. Melanie struggles in letting go of her husband; Ptonomy is haunted by the memory of his mother's death; Cary and Kerry open up about their body sharing experience; Walter feeling slower than common people; and Syd struggles with her perception of reality.

As Syd wanders around the hospital, it is revealed that Amy is now a nurse working at Clockworks. David is also a patient, but like the rest of the team, is unaware of the nature of the hospital. They then start re-enacting part of David's life at Clockworks, with small differences. Syd starts questioning the veracity of the place and her real memories come back. However, Lenny uses music therapy to place her in a coma with headphones and prevent her from warning anyone, locking her in David's childhood bedroom.

While sleeping, Cary is visited by Oliver in the diving suit, who takes him to the astral plane, vanishing from Clockworks. Kerry desperately tries to search for Cary, only to be taunted by Walter. Oliver also visits Melanie, guiding her to David's childhood home where their bodies remain frozen in time. Oliver disappears, instructing Melanie to save David and Syd, who were going to be shot by Walter's bullets. Melanie struggles in moving David and Syd from their positions. Suddenly, the wall reveals two eyes staring at her.

David confronts Lenny for answers on Syd's disappearance. Lenny then taunts David, revealing that she met his biological father and suggests they could team up to reach their power potential, revealing herself to be a form of the Devil with Yellow Eyes. Deeming him too weak to help her, Lenny locks David inside a casket inside his own mind. At David's childhood bedroom, the man in the diving suit takes off Syd's headphones, waking her up. The man reveals himself to be Cary.

== Production ==
=== Development ===
In February 2017, it was reported that the sixth episode of the season would be titled "Chapter 6", and was to be directed by Hiro Murai and written by co-producer Nathaniel Halpern. This was Halpern's second writing credit, and Murai's first directing credit.

== Reception ==
=== Viewers ===
In its original American broadcast, "Chapter 6" was seen by an estimated 0.732 million household viewers and gained a 0.3 ratings share among adults aged 18–49, according to Nielsen Media Research. This means that 0.3 percent of all households with televisions watched the episode. This was a 8% decrease in viewership from the previous episode, which was watched by 0.795 million viewers with a 0.4 in the 18-49 demographics.

=== Critical reviews ===
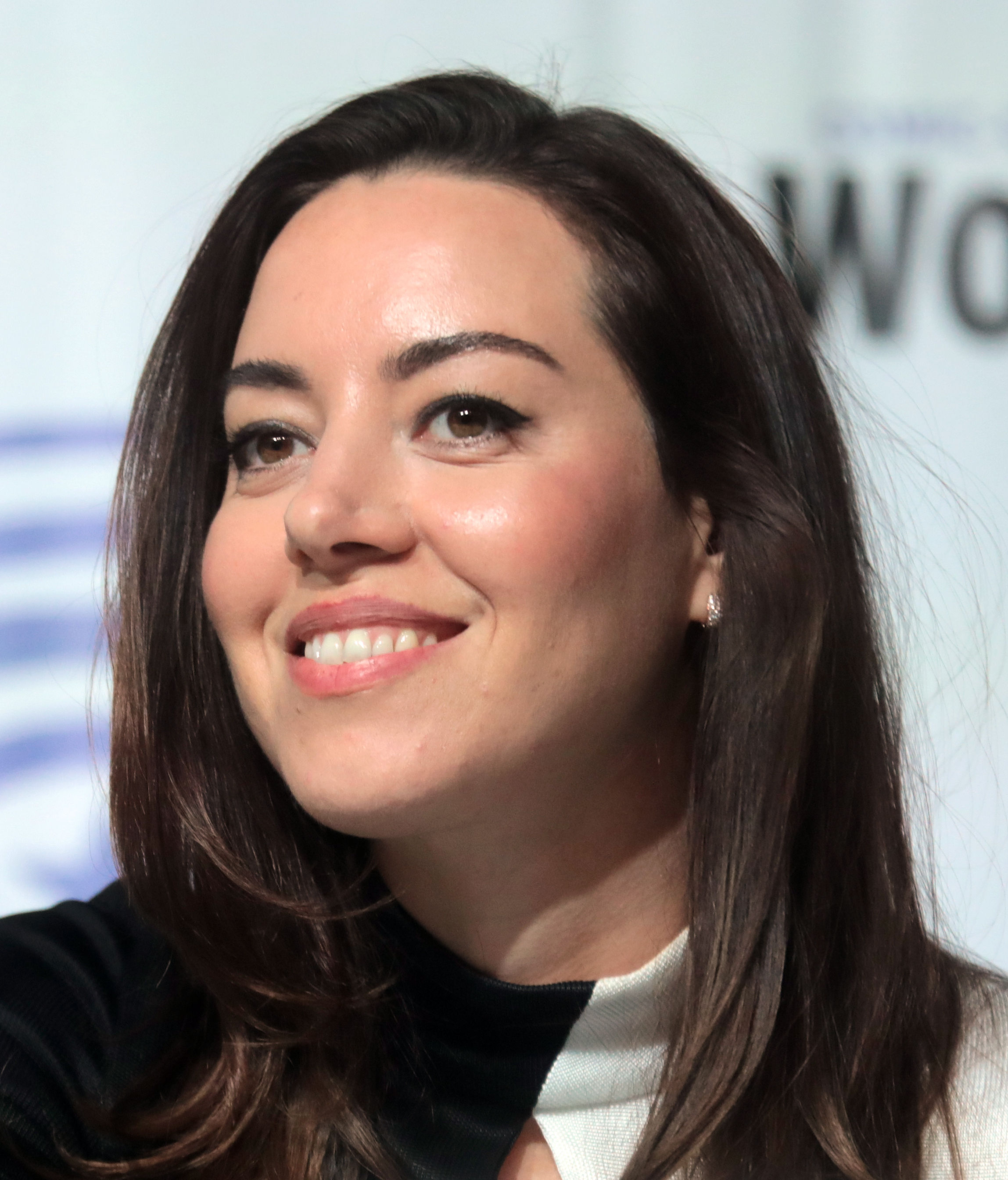
Aubrey Plaza's performance in the episode was acclaimed by critics.

"Chapter 6" received mixed reviews from critics. The review aggregator website Rotten Tomatoes reported a 65% approval rating with an average rating of 7.4/10 for the episode, based on 17 reviews. The site's consensus states: "Hiro Murai's direction injects 'Chapter 6' with stylistic flourishes, yet Legion's return to the Clockworks Psychiatric Hospital ultimately succumbs to a sense of stasis."

Scott Collura of IGN gave the episode an "amazing" 9.1 out of 10 and wrote in his verdict, "Another strong episode for Legion proves that Noah Hawley's show is not a one-trick mutant pony, but can find continued substance amid its visual and aural flair while also putting together the pieces of its narrative puzzle in a satisfying way."

Danette Chavez of The A.V. Club gave the episode an "A-" grade and wrote, "Hiro Murai directed this episode, bringing his Atlanta and Childish Gambino sensibilities, and just crushed it. The interlude worked as seamlessly as the Bollywood number from the premiere."

Alan Sepinwall of Uproxx wrote, "Placing characters in an asylum and telling them that everything they've experienced in the series to that point isn't real is among the oldest, hoariest of TV cliches. It can have value if done right, and Legion, with its focus on the mental health of its main character, is more entitled to use it than most, but it's still a drag, and one that feels like a way to stall the story that Hawley and company are telling across these first eight episodes." Kevin P. Sullivan of Entertainment Weekly wrote, "When the fact that David is upset can mean terrible things for those around him, the stuff that makes the character who he is allowed to drive the story like plot. 'Chapter 6' is a really good example of that." Oliver Sava of Vulture gave the episode a 2 star rating out of 5 and wrote, "This week's Legion returns to Clockworks Psychiatric Hospital and stays there far too long. The pacing for this series has been inconsistent... but the narrative has never lagged like it does in 'Chapter 6.'"

Sean T. Collins of The New York Times wrote, "Given the momentum the show had built as David gained control of his powers and then had them violently seized by his nemesis, devoting a full episode to this sense of stasis is a real shame." Nick Harley of Den of Geek gave the episode a 4 star rating out of 5 and wrote, "I still have a million questions, like who exactly is Lenny and did she really die in Clockworks like tonight's little flashback suggests, but I try to silence them like David blocking out the voices of others in his head. With season two of Legion now assured, I'll just sit back, bask in the ambiguity, and enjoy the ride." Katherine Siegel of Paste gave the episode a 6 rating out of 10 and wrote, "I guess it was bound to happen eventually. The honeymoon is officially over, and all those adorable little quirks that once made Legion so endearing now appear pointless, like an ex who tells the same joke over and over. It was funny the first five times, honey, but now I'm starting to worry if you really don't know why the chicken crossed the road."

=== Accolades ===
TVLine named Aubrey Plaza as the "Performer of the Week" for the week of March 18, 2017, for her performance in the episode. The site wrote, "As mischievous sidekick Lenny on FX's mind-bending superhero drama Legion, Plaza often taps into that rich vein of cynical sarcasm that served her so well as April Ludgate on Parks and Recreation. But when Legion switched gears this week, it allowed Plaza to show off a whole new side to Lenny. (Two or three sides, really.)"
