= Chapter 8 (Legion) =

- Legion episode
- Episode no.: Season 1 Episode 8
- Directed by: Michael Uppendahl
- Written by: Noah Hawley
- Cinematography by: Craig Wrobleski
- Editing by: Regis Kimble
- Production code: XLN01008
- Original air date: March 29, 2017
- Running time: 49 minutes

Guest appearances
- Jemaine Clement as Oliver Bird; Hamish Linklater as Clark Debussy; Keir O'Donnell as Daniel Debussy

Episode chronology
← Previous "Chapter 7"	Next → "Chapter 9"
- Legion season 1

"Chapter 8" is the eighth episode and season finale of the first season of the American surrealist superhero thriller television series Legion, based on the Marvel Comics character of the same name. The episode was written by series creator Noah Hawley and directed by Michael Uppendahl. It originally aired on FX on March 29, 2017.

The series follows David Haller, a "mutant" diagnosed with schizophrenia at a young age, as he tries to control his psychic powers and combat the sinister forces trying to control him. In the episode, the Summerland team works to save David, who is struggling to keep Farouk from fully possessing his body.

According to Nielsen Media Research, the episode was seen by an estimated 0.812 million household viewers and gained a 0.4 ratings share among adults aged 18–49. The episode received extremely positive reviews from critics, who praised the performances, directing, and set-up for the next season, although some expressed criticism for the pacing, lack of character development and narrative.

== Plot ==
In flashbacks, after David escaped, his interrogator named Clark survives the explosion but is put in a coma. After waking up and leaving the hospital, Clark wants to return to the field for Division 3, despite struggling with his condition. He is allowed to return to the field, where he leads a team to Summerland.

Clark ambushes the team, but David uses his powers to pile the soldiers up with no effort. Clark is then placed in custody of Summerland, while his superiors decide to wait to see what happens before deploying more forces, revealing that they can see everything through a camera in Clark's prosthetic eye. As the team needs to take Farouk out of David's mind before it takes over his body, they subject him to a test in the lab, as his condition is worsening. Syd is transported to the astral room by Farouk, realizing that he is becoming weaker. Farouk warns Syd that if she does not help him escape David's mind, David won't survive the extraction at the lab.

Syd tells Clark about Farouk, hoping that they could team up to stop him, but Melanie does not trust Division 3. She leaves Clark's detainment room, showing footage of the Shadow King, which surprises Clark and his superiors, the latter demanding the "Equinox" be sent in. As a last resort, Syd enters the lab room and kisses David, transferring Farouk through her body. Farouk then transfers to Kerry, who attacks the team. David confronts Farouk and both collide, with enough force that expels Farouk out of Kerry's body. As Oliver opens a door, he is thrown back by Farouk's force, ending up possessed.

With no one noticing, Farouk leaves Summerland in Oliver's body. David regains consciousness and talks with Clark, who agrees that Summerland and Division 3 need to work together. After awaking Syd, the team realizes that Farouk escaped in Oliver's body. At night, David and Syd talk on a balcony, when they are interrupted by the arrival of a drone-like device. The device scans David and then traps him inside it. The device leaves Summerland with a screaming David asking for help, and Syd going back inside Summerland.

== Production ==
=== Development ===
In February 2017, it was reported that the eighth and final episode of the season would be titled "Chapter 8", and was to be directed by Michael Uppendahl and written by series creator Noah Hawley. This was Hawley's third writing credit, and Uppendahl's third directing credit.

=== Writing ===
Series creator Noah Hawley wanted it to start with Clark, stating "I thought it'd be very interesting to start this episode from his point of view, so he's not just a horribly burned villain walking on screen. He's a person who has lost something, and is struggling to hold onto his humanity. Now he has a much more sympathetic energy to him... in his movie, David is the villain."

The final scene, where David gets trapped by the orb, is meant to symbolize the end of the story and the beginning of the second season. Hawley wanted the first season to represent fighting against the enemy within, and the second season would represent fighting against the enemy without. Hawley also wanted the scene to be held as a post-credits scene, an element often used in adaptations of Marvel Comics and for the audience, "to let them absorb the complete story they just watched, and then tease them as to what Chapter 2 is going to be".

== Reception ==
=== Viewers ===
In its original American broadcast, "Chapter 8" was seen by an estimated 0.812 million household viewers and gained a 0.4 ratings share among adults aged 18–49, according to Nielsen Media Research. This means that 0.4 percent of all households with televisions watched the episode. This was a 13% increase in viewership from the previous episode, which was watched by 0.716 million viewers with a 0.4 in the 18-49 demographics.

With DVR factored in, the episode was watched by 2.01 million viewers with a 1.0 in the 18-49 demographics.

=== Critical reviews ===
"Chapter 8" received extremely positive reviews from critics. The review aggregator website Rotten Tomatoes reported an 89% approval rating with an average rating of 8.2/10 for the episode, based on 19 reviews. The site's consensus states: "Legion's season finale nudges the series closer to asserting its comic roots, forgoing some of its more convention-flouting tendencies in favor of deeper storytelling - and arranging the canvas nicely for its sophomore season."

Scott Collura of IGN gave the episode a "great" 8.5 out of 10 and wrote in his verdict, "Legion ends its first year in a typically stylish manner, if not with its strongest episode of the season. 'Chapter 8' seems to set up elements for Season 2 as much as it does resolve Season 1, but we at least have now reached a new era for David where he is free of the Shadow King's influence... even if the creature is still out there somewhere."

Alex McLevy of The A.V. Club gave the episode a "B+" grade and wrote, "This season was entrancing, puzzling, exhausting, and energizing in equal measure. That's storytelling that doesn't need any mutant abilities - it's exerting a singular power all its own."

Alan Sepinwall of Uproxx wrote, "'Chapter 8' had some exciting action/thriller/horror beats, and some memorably weird images, like the tower of D3 soldiers flailing and groaning after David's power sculpted them into place like that, but it was a bit more normal than I'd hoped for, and as a result revealed the show to be a bit emptier than it had seemed at its frantic best." Kevin P. Sullivan of Entertainment Weekly wrote, "The finale for the first season of Legion, easily the biggest delight of the TV year so far, turns down the volume to take a breath and nod in the direction of show's future." Oliver Sava of Vulture gave the episode a 4 star rating out of 5 and wrote, "I was rarely bored watching this season, and tonight's finale is one of the strongest episodes yet, offering salvation for David Haller but delivering doom to the rest of the planet."

Sean T. Collins of The New York Times wrote, "A little more care is exactly what this episode, and the show in general, really needed." Nick Harley of Den of Geek wrote, "Though the final showdown may have left a little to be desired, the rest of the episode featured all of the elements that made this season such a joy to watch and set up the series nicely for its return. I still have plenty of questions and things I'd like to see expanded on when Legion returns in 2018, but once again Noah Hawley and FX took a challenging property on and completely knocked it out of the park. Legion has proved to be an Omega-level TV series." Katherine Siegel of Paste gave the episode a 9 rating out of 10 and wrote, "These are not circumstances that those without firsthand experience can easily understand or imagine, and as such, this clear and direct attempt to generate not just sympathy but empathy that makes Legion a game-changer."
