= Chapter 4 (Legion) =

- Legion episode
- Episode no.: Season 1 Episode 4
- Directed by: Larysa Kondracki
- Written by: Nathaniel Halpern
- Cinematography by: Craig Wrobleski
- Editing by: Chris A. Peterson; Regis Kimble
- Production code: XLN01004
- Original air date: March 1, 2017
- Running time: 54 minutes

Guest appearances
- Jemaine Clement as Oliver Bird; Scott Lawrence as Dr. Henry Poole

Episode chronology
← Previous "Chapter 3"	Next → "Chapter 5"
- Legion season 1

"Chapter 4" is the fourth episode of the first season of the American surrealist superhero thriller television series Legion, based on the Marvel Comics character of the same name. The episode was written by co-producer Nathaniel Halpern and directed by Larysa Kondracki. It originally aired on FX on March 1, 2017.

The series follows David Haller, a "mutant" diagnosed with schizophrenia at a young age, as he tries to control his psychic powers and combat the sinister forces trying to control him. In the episode, with David still trapped in the astral plane, the team tries to get him out with the help of more memories.

According to Nielsen Media Research, the episode was seen by an estimated 0.750 million household viewers and gained a 0.4 ratings share among adults aged 18–49. The episode received critical acclaim, with critics praising the character development, writing, performances, visual style and atmosphere.

== Plot ==
A narrator, in an undisclosed location, welcomes the audience, stating that the intention is to show a five-act story that encapsulates fear and empathy. The man turns on a film projector, also revealing that his location is set inside an ice cube.

With David still trapped inside his mind, the team concludes that he created an astral plane that blends reality and fantasy. To find more about him, they check his psychiatrist's office, which shows evidence of a struggle and a bloodied tape recorder. Ptonomy suspects David may have attacked Dr. Poole while trying to destroy the recorder but Syd refuses to recognize it.

While imprisoned by Division 3, Amy communicates with an inmate through the cell's wall. The inmate is Dr. Kissinger, David's doctor, whom Clockworks denied his existence. Amy states that David often acted strange and displayed supernatural abilities, such as appearing in different places and claiming to hear voices. David often talked with imaginary people, including someone known as "King". Kissinger believes that it refers to his dog, until Amy explains that they never had a dog.

Melanie decides to visit a cryogenic room, where her husband Oliver lays frozen inside a diving suit. She believes her visions may indicate he will wake up, but Cary is not convinced. In the astral plane, David follows a man in a diving suit, who climbs to an ice cube. Inside the cube, the man takes off the diving suit, revealing himself to be the narrator and Oliver himself. The narrator has been trapped in the plane for years, using the ice cube to save himself from a monster, which he describes as a parasite inside David's mind. He allows David to leave the cube.

Ptonomy, Syd and Kerry delve more into David's real life. Ptonomy and Syd visit Philly, David's ex-girlfriend, and Ptonomy enters her memories. While seeing a memory of a talk with David and Dr. Poole, the memory is glitched by the image of a lighthouse. Before leaving, Syd questions Philly, who states that tried to help David for his drug addiction. She also reveals that David had a friend named Benny, whom he used drugs with. She warns them that "they are watching". The team concludes that someone altered David's memories and replaced Benny with Lenny.

Ptonomy, Syd and Kerry visit Dr. Poole, who lives in the lighthouse. However, Poole turns out to be Walter and the team is ambushed by Division 3 agents. Walter knocks Ptonomy out and Kerry is captured. However, Syd switches bodies with Walter with a touch and knocks Walter out in Syd's body. As agents arrive, she orders to put them in a van that he will use. Back in the astral plane, David is taunted by Lenny, who shows him an image from the real world where Ptonomy, Kerry and Syd (unaware that is Walter), are being driven in a van. This angers David, who finally breaks out of the astral plane and his presence in the road causes Syd (in Walter's body) to crash the van. David frees the team, but Syd gives chase to Walter until she is stopped by David. After morphing back into her body, David sees as Walter shoots Kerry in the shoulder before escaping. In Summerland, Cary collapses from the effects of the shot.

== Production ==
=== Development ===
In January 2017, it was reported that the fourth episode of the season would be titled "Chapter 4", and was to be directed by Larysa Kondracki and written by co-producer Nathaniel Halpern. This was Halpern's first writing credit, and Kondracki's first directing credit.

=== Casting ===
In October 2016, it was announced that Jemaine Clement would guest star in the series in a recurring role.

== Reception ==
=== Viewers ===
In its original American broadcast, "Chapter 4" was seen by an estimated 0.750 million household viewers and gained a 0.4 ratings share among adults aged 18–49, according to Nielsen Media Research. This means that 0.4 percent of all households with televisions watched the episode. This was a 28% decrease in viewership from the previous episode, which was watched by 1.04 million viewers with a 0.5 in the 18-49 demographics.

=== Critical reviews ===
"Chapter 4" received critical acclaim. The review aggregator website Rotten Tomatoes reported a 100% approval rating with an average rating of 9.0/10 for the episode, based on 18 reviews. The site's consensus states: "The strangest, most gripping Legion episode to date, 'Chapter 4' still moves the show's storytelling forward in a more traditional and illuminating way."

Scott Collura of IGN gave the episode a "great" 8.9 out of 10 and wrote in his verdict, "Legion is still going strong, branching out this week with some new and expanded characters and settings (and astral plane settings) while continuing to delve into the mystery that is at the center of David's mind. 'The past is an illusion', says Ptonomy. The question when it comes to David is, is any of it real?"

Alex McLevy of The A.V. Club gave the episode an "A" grade and wrote, "'Chapter 4' explicitly addresses the nature of storytelling, right from its opening sequence of Oliver breaking the fourth wall to address us directly."

Alan Sepinwall of Uproxx wrote, "Tonight's Legion may be the weirdest, most abstract hour of TV I've seen since Twin Peaks ended. Even compared to the previous three episodes — even just compared to the bananas debut chapter, as opposed to the slightly more conventional second and third installments — this was cuckoo for Cocoa Puffs. And I loved every baffling minute of it." Kevin P. Sullivan of Entertainment Weekly wrote, "Looking ahead, it seems like we're finally about to get some real info about the Devil with the Yellow Eyes." Oliver Sava of Vulture gave the episode a perfect 5 star rating out of 5 and wrote, "The Legion creative team has to perform a challenging balancing act as the series splits time between mind-bending psycho-drama and X-Men-influenced superhero storytelling, and 'Chapter Four' is the most successful example of this dynamic yet."

Sean T. Collins of The New York Times wrote, "For the first time, Legion feels like the show its proponents said it was from the start." Ron Gilmer of TV Fanatic gave the episode a perfect 5 star rating out of 5 and wrote, "I don't think we're ever going to get a purely linear show as far as plot goes, and that's great, but they moved the needle more towards standard storytelling, and that can only help." Katherine Siegel of Paste gave the episode a 7 rating out of 10 and wrote, "There's a bit of charm missing from this week's Legion. Where exactly it got lost is hard to say, but the lighthearted quirkiness that has helped balance the show's darker, more philosophical themes isn't really featured — a bit surprising, as David and company's exploration of the astral plane should create more opportunities for surrealism, or just plain weirdness, than any plotline that takes place in real world."
