= Chapter 1 (Legion) =

- Legion episode
- To depict David Haller losing control of his abilities, footage of actor Dan Stevens was layered together with filmed practical effects.
- Episode no.: Season 1 Episode 1
- Directed by: Noah Hawley
- Written by: Noah Hawley
- Cinematography by: Dana Gonzales
- Editing by: Regis Kimble
- Production code: XLN01001
- Original air date: February 8, 2017
- Running time: 68 minutes

Guest appearances
- Hamish Linklater as the Interrogator; David Selby as Brubaker

Episode chronology
← Previous —	Next → "Chapter 2"
- Legion season 1

"Chapter 1" is the pilot and first episode of the first season of the American surrealist superhero thriller television series Legion, based on the Marvel Comics character David Haller. The episode follows David, who believes himself to have schizophrenia until he is interrogated by government agents who think he may be the most powerful mutant alive. The episode was written and directed by series creator Noah Hawley.

Dan Stevens stars as David, alongside series regulars Rachel Keller, Aubrey Plaza, Jeremie Harris, Amber Midthunder, Katie Aselton, and Jean Smart. FX ordered a pilot for Legion in October 2015, with Hawley attached. He structured the episode to reflect David's confused headspace, and to explore issues of mental illness. The episode was filmed in Vancouver and nearby soundstages, with elaborate sequences and in-camera practical effects worked into the 21-day filming schedule. These included several montages, a Bollywood dance number, and a complicated single take action sequence. The practical effects were digitally augmented by Folks VFX.

"Chapter 1" originally aired on FX on February 8, 2017, and was watched by 3.59 million viewers within a week of its release. The episode was praised by critics for its inventive storytelling and visuals, distancing itself from other superhero stories, as well as the performance of Stevens and Hawley's direction. However, some critics found the unreliable narrator aspect too confusing.

== Plot ==
David Haller is being interrogated by officials of the agency Division 3, who believe he may be the most powerful mutant (someone possessing a genetic trait that gives them superhuman characteristics) discovered. He explains that he was diagnosed with schizophrenia when he was young, and became increasingly troubled growing up. He eventually attempted suicide, and was taken to Clockworks Psychiatric Hospital. He also starts to remember unexplainable incidents, such as a time that an entire kitchen exploded around him. Six years after entering the hospital, he was visited by his sister Amy, who believed that he was much improved. By then, David was just waiting for something new to happen.

A new patient, Sydney "Syd" Barrett, soon arrived at the hospital. She refused to be touched by anyone, but agreed to be David's girlfriend and they started spending all their time together. Syd was eventually discharged from the hospital, and David decided to kiss her goodbye. When he touched her, their minds switched bodies. Syd was unable to control David's body, apparently causing chaos that killed several other patients, including David's friend Lenny, and trapping many of the building's inhabitants within a room that was structurally altered. David escaped the hospital with a doctor, who believed that he was Syd.

David's body eventually returned to him, and he went looking for Syd back at the hospital. He soon found himself being chased by two people, until he was captured by Division 3. Agents of the latter attempt to contain David and prevent him from using his powers against them, though he doesn't realize what he can do. The two people that were chasing him earlier, Ptonomy Wallace and Kerry Loudermilk, break into the facility that David is being held in, along with Syd. The group, along with others who exhibit unusual abilities, fight off Division 3's soldiers and race down a hill. They reach a boat on a beach, where Melanie Bird offers to take David to safety.

== Production ==
=== Development ===
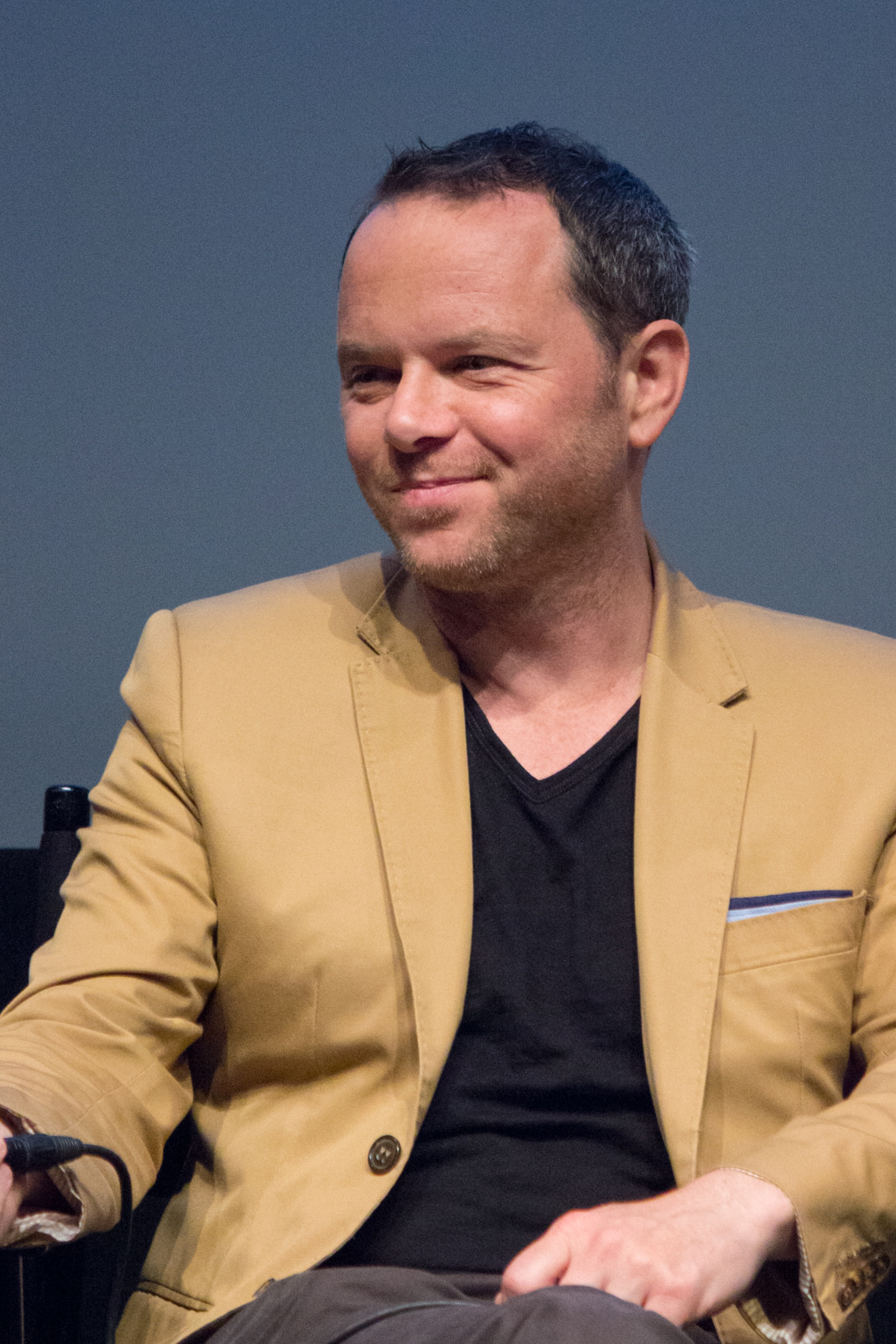
Creator Noah Hawley wrote and directed the pilot himself

In October 2015, FX ordered a pilot for Legion, to be based on the Marvel Comics character of the same name. Marvel Television and FX Productions were set to produce the pilot, with FX Productions handling the physical production. Noah Hawley signed on to write the episode, and executive produce the potential series. Hawley's initial script was described as "less fractured", "cohesive [and] much more regular." However, he quickly reconceived the series to be "more Eternal Sunshine of the Spotless Mind, Terrence Malick, more whimsy, more impressionistic". In January 2017, it was announced that the pilot was simply titled "Chapter 1", and that it was also directed by Hawley.

=== Writing ===
The pilot script had been read by FX executives by January 2016, with FX President John Landgraf saying that it "might be [set] a few years in the past". In May 2016, Hawley explained that he felt the telling of a story should be structured in a way that reflects the content of that story, for instance a story featuring a character who "doesn't know what's real and what's not real, then the audience should have the same experience". He added that he saw this experience as being whimsical, imaginative, and unexpected. Hawley aimed to have the world "fully realized and filled out" during the pilot, so that the second episode could explore David in a different way to how he is introduced in the premiere.

The episode begins with a four-minute montage showing David's life from birth to adulthood, which Hawley felt was important to establish what the character has gone through in terms of mental illness, rather than introduce him as someone who learns he is not actually mentally ill and then moves on. Hawley explained that the montage begins with David as a child, showing "nothing but promise", but then his abilities manifest around when, "for some kids, the illness would be kicking in." The montage then becomes a more negative, tragic story. Hawley noted the importance of showing David questioning whether he has a mental illness or not during the episode, a common struggle for real people with the condition. Another montage that Hawley wrote into the script was a love story montage, which he felt gives the audience "something to root for", a positive goal to balance out the darker or sadder elements of the series.

Hawley described the pilot episode as having a sense of jumping out of the frying pan into the fire; "architecturally, with that first hour ... you think you're in a police interview room, but then you walk out the door and it's a set that's built at the bottom of an empty swimming pool." Actor Dan Stevens said that the idea was to "rattle your perceptions" as a form of welcoming audiences to the show, so the pilot could accurately introduce viewers to the "kind of show we want to make". Hawley felt that audiences would accept the confusing storytelling of the episode, told from the perspective of the unreliable narrator David, due to the character's grounded love story.

=== Casting ===
In January 2016, Rachel Keller was cast as the female lead of the pilot, after her breakout role in Hawley's Fargo. In early February, Stevens, Aubrey Plaza, and Jean Smart were cast as David, his friend Lenny Busker, and therapist Melanie Bird, respectively. Also, Keller's role was revealed to be Syd Barrett. Later that month, Jeremie Harris was cast in the regular role of Ptonomy Wallace, and Amber Midthunder was cast as the savant Kerry Loudermilk. In March, Katie Aselton was cast as Haller's older sister Amy. Bill Irwin was also cast, but is not introduced until the series' second episode.

Also in February 2017, David Selby announced that he would appear in three episodes of the season, portraying government agent Brubaker. Also, Ellie Araiza was cast in the recurring role of Philly, David's previous girlfriend. Selby guest stars in the pilot alongside Hamish Linklater as the interrogator. Additional appearances in the episode include David Ferry as Dr. Kissinger, Araiza as Philly, Matt Hamilton as Ben, Brad Mann as Rudy, Quinton Boisclair as the Devil with the Yellow Eyes, and Mackenzie Gray as the Eye. Belinda Sobie, Sabine Uwimambe, Karina Ho, Edwin Perez, Mandy Rushton, Monica Gutierrez, and Stephanie Lavigne appear as dancers in the episode.

=== Filming ===
Executive producer Simon Kinberg predicted in November 2015 that production on the pilot would start early the next year, and Landgraf revealed in January 2016 that construction on sets had already begun. A month later, filming for the pilot was set to begin in March, in Vancouver, with Dana Gonzales serving as cinematographer.

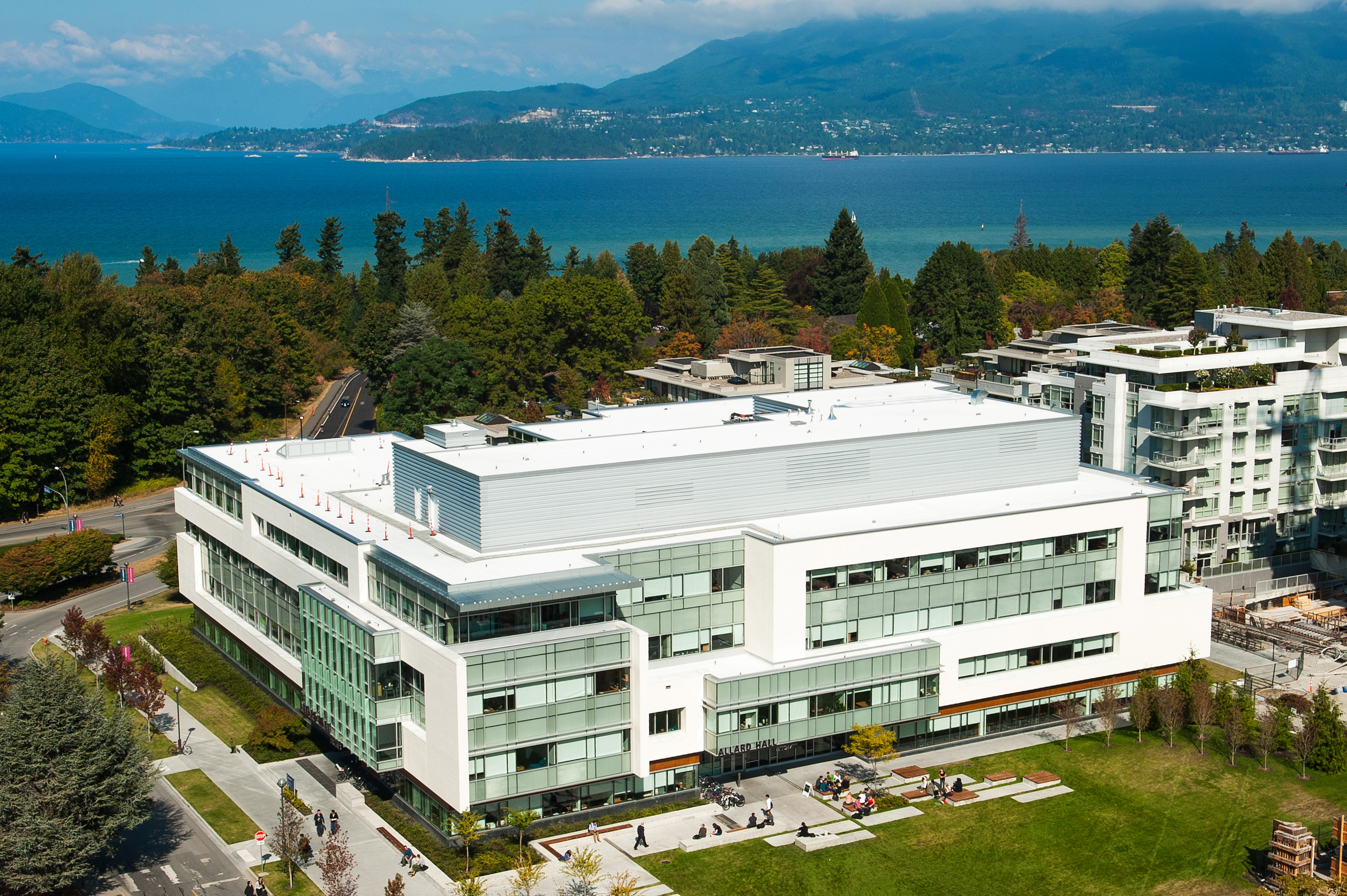
Filming took place at the University of British Columbia, including for the Clockworks hospital exterior

Gonzales had not seen any of the X-Men films, which was seen as an advantage for the series to create its own visual style. A "23,000-square-foot set" for the corridors and "vast day room" of the Clockworks Mental Hospital was constructed in a former supermarket warehouse in Burnaby, just southeast of Vancouver. Exteriors for the building were shot at the University of British Columbia "where they have a lot of that sixties and seventies brutalist architecture" that is often seen in government and institutional buildings.

The episode was shot over 21 days, and featured a large amount of in-camera effects rather than just CGI. For instance, Hawley said that one day of filming was "upside-down day, so you're not just setting up a camera with two people talking. We're trying to tell the story with the camera and the visuals ... we're ambitious." For the two sequences where David destroys elements of his environment, Hawley particularly wanted to avoid visual effects so that it was believable that the character was actually doing it himself. For the scene where a kitchen explodes around David, a "repeatable camera arm, high-speed, high-frame" was used to film the set as kitchen items were exploded from drawers and cabinets for real. The camera, called the Bolt, weighs 2,000 pounds (910 kg) and runs on a track. It "will do a two-second move, or three-second move, and it shoots about 1,000 frames a second." The set decorator provided doubles and triples of the kitchen elements, which were blown across the room in multiple takes by 30 to 40 air cannons. This provided "the raw material for a 3-D spin in a kitchen of chaos"; all the filmed elements were then layered over Stevens, who was filmed separately with the camera on the same set. A similar process was used for the other sequence, where David destroys a table in the interrogation room, with plates filmed showing Stevens' acting, stunt men flying backwards, and a table being blown up, that were later layered together.

While deciding on sequences to shoot for the love story montage, which was not elaborated on in the script, Hawley and the crew came up with a Bollywood dance number, with Hawley saying, "what else does falling in love feel like other than a Bollywood dance routine, really?" Later, during editing of the episode with Regis Kimble, the sequence was moved from the montage to its own full sequence in the episode. The sequence gave Hawley the chance to say that the series has "whimsy to it and music is a part of it. It's not a musical but you should expect the unexpected". The dance was choreographed by Vanessa Young, the creative director of Vancouver-based dance group The Lovers Cabaret. Young produced five or six routines choreographed to a real Bollywood song, and spent a Saturday rehearsing the sequence with Stevens and Hawley so the latter could plan how to film the dance. He noted that it was the first time he had filmed a dance sequence. On the day of filming the sequence, Stevens had food poisoning. Hawley called him "a trooper", saying Stevens "worked all day and he looked terrible and felt terrible. But every time we counted down to one [to begin rolling], the big smile came on his face and he did the dance routine perfectly." Hawley wasn't able to get the last two or three shots that he wanted for the sequence, because he called off the shoot once Stevens finally threw up.

The climactic "prison break" sequence was described by Stevens as "the payoff that people are waiting for ... you're going, OK, this is a superhero show, but where are the explosions? Nobody's died yet! What's going on? And then it suddenly goes full action, very very quickly." The scene is a long, uninterrupted take following a group of mutants as they use their abilities to fight off the government's soldiers. Hawley did not originally conceive of the long take, with his script pages for the action sequence being "not a very detailed thing", but the idea developed while he was prepping to direct the episode. The shot took several days to film, with the production waiting anytime a cloud was visible to keep a consistently cloudless sky. The sequence was carefully planned to match the timing of the running actors, live explosions, and future visual effects.

=== Music ===
When first meeting with composer Jeff Russo about the series, Hawley told Russo that he wanted the series to sound like Pink Floyd's The Dark Side of the Moon, explaining "that album more than anything is really the soundscape of mental illness to some degree". With the pilot's release, Russo stated that the through line of the series is the relationship between David and Syd, and said that a love story "lends itself to musical moments. It allows it to underscore the character."

The opening montage is set to "Happy Jack" by The Who, and the love story montage plays to "She's a Rainbow" by The Rolling Stones. Despite initially choreographing the Bollywood dance sequence to an actual Bollywood song, Hawley ultimately set the sequence to Serge Gainsbourg's "Pauvre Lola" which "added to the surreal-ness of it ... [the song] has a Bollywood feel, but is not what you would expect. Haller's prison break sequence plays to "Up the Beach" by Jane's Addiction.

=== Visual effects ===
Folks VFX provided visual effects for the episode, including creating digital environments and stunt doubles and showing mutant abilities during the climactic action sequence. Visual effects supervisor John Ross, collaborating with Hawley again after Fargo, noted that though "hundreds of thousands of dollars" was spent on major visual effect sequences for the show, "we don't dwell on that aspect. There's a jeep that gets slammed down [in the episode], which the characters hide behind before it gets flung back into the building, but we pan off it, just throwing it away, because the destruction isn't the point of the scene." For the kitchen sequence, visual effects were used to layer the different images of debris over Stevens' performance. This transitions to all the circling around David, which was created digitally. Rotoscoping was used to have the digital debris moving behind and in front of the character as it spins around him. A knife that flies past David's face was also added digitally. The visual effects for this part had to match the look and feel of the earlier, practical effects. At the end of the interrogation room sequence, a shot was created that sees David pass out, and then appears to have the camera pull back into the ground below him which Hawley said gave a "subject sense of what passing out is like, but just an element [that] makes it more interesting."

== Release ==
=== Broadcast ===
"Chapter 1" aired in the United States on FX on February 8, 2017. The episode was also shown on Fox channels in over 125 countries, using a "day-and-date" delivery system so that viewers around the world got the episode on the same day as the U.S.

=== Marketing ===
The first footage from the episode was shown at San Diego Comic-Con 2016, when Marvel's Chief Creative Officer Joe Quesada debuted the first trailer for the series at his "Cup O'Joe" panel. Response to the trailer from critics was positive, particularly for its unique tone and visuals. Kelly West at CinemaBlend called the trailer "all kinds of weird... in a good way". At New York Comic-Con later that year, the series held its own panel, where the first half of the episode was screened. Nick Romano of Entertainment Weekly called the footage "just as chaotic as the mind of David Haller" and "almost Kubrickian in nature". The full episode premiered at a red carpet event on January 26, 2017, in West Hollywood's Pacific Design Center. It was received enthusiastically by the audience, including the character's original creator Bill Sienkiewicz. The event was followed by various marketing ventures, including an "immersive art exhibit" for the next three days, and a cocktail bar at the Century Club in London on February 8, named The Mutant Lounge.

=== Home media ===
In September 2017, the episode was made available, along with the rest of the first season, on the FX+ online streaming service, accessible to customers of Cox On Demand, Xfinity On Demand, and the FX Now app. The episode was released in Region 1 on DVD and Blu-ray along with the rest of the first season on March 27, 2018. Included on the release was an alternate version of the Bollywood dance sequence.

== Reception ==
=== Ratings ===
Writing for Screen Rant, J.M. Brandt noted that the episode's 90 minute length (with commercials) and late premiere time of 10pm on a Wednesday night, would affect its viewership, and felt that the show's success would heavily depend on DVR viewing "to bolster what might be a likely smallish live audience". The episode ultimately received a 0.7 percent share among adults between the ages of 18 and 49 in the U.S., and was watched by 1.62 million viewers. These ratings were described as "OK, not great", in line with other cable series debuts, but lower than other high-profile FX debuts such as American Crime Story and Hawley's own Fargo. Including DVR numbers, the episode was eventually watched by 3.59 million viewers over its first week of release. This was considered a strong increase for the episode, and made it the second-most watched episode on cable for the week.

=== Critical response ===
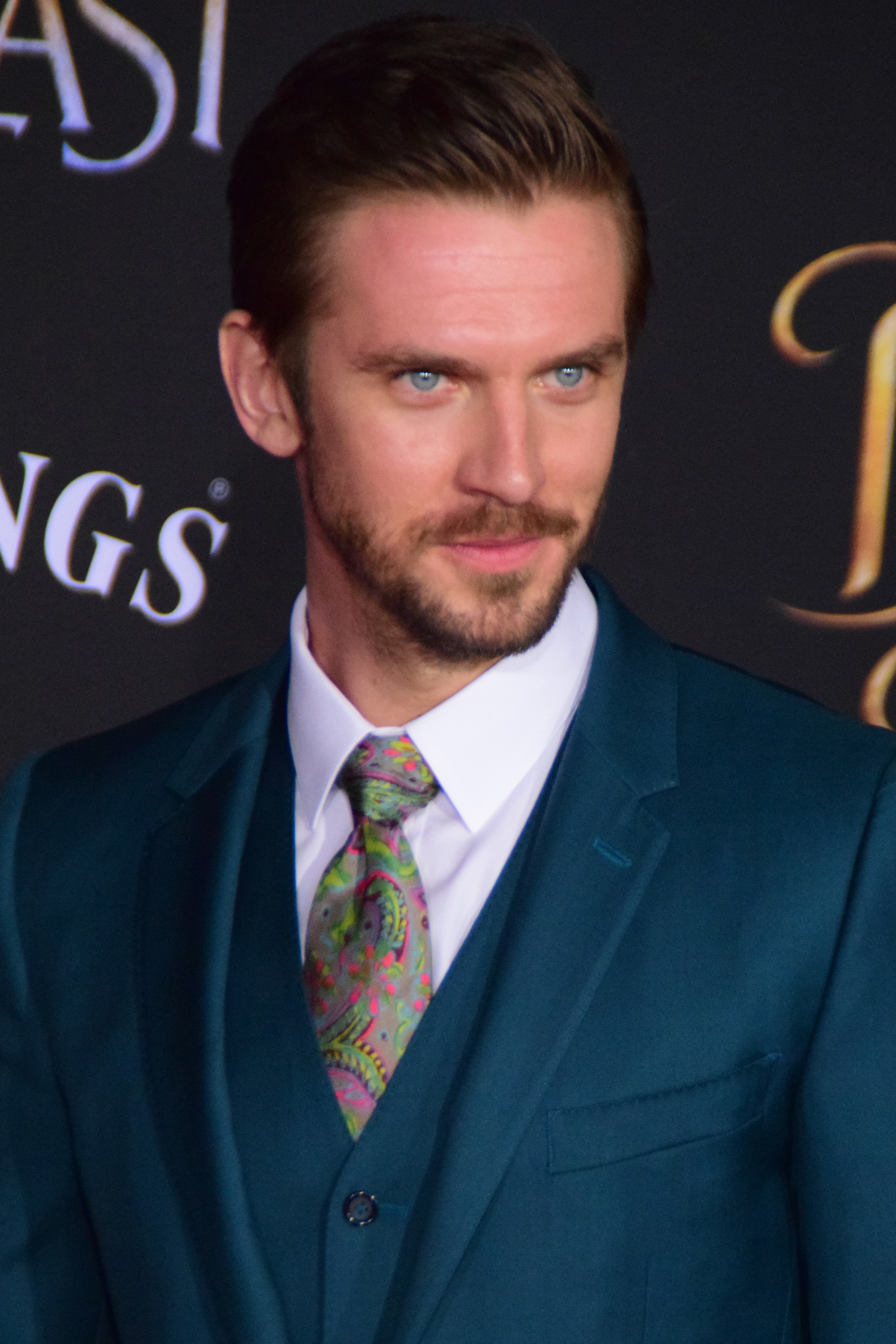
Dan Stevens received praise for his performance as the series' title character

The review aggregator website Rotten Tomatoes reported an 88% approval rating for the episode, with an average rating of 8.71/10 based on 16 reviews. The website's critical consensus reads, "Equal parts innovative and absurd, 'Chapter 1' plunges the audience into a boldly creative universe that seems likely to warrant continued viewing."

James Poniewozik of The New York Times noted that flashbacks and nonlinear storytelling can often turn series into puzzles, but for Legion "the chaos is immersive", creating an episode that Poniewozik thought was stunning but also hard to follow. He also felt it was grounded by Stevens' performance, and quipped that he hoped the character would never become "a full-fledged superhero, because it's so engrossing to watch his origin story." Robert Bianco at USA Today said that episode was initially confusing and frustrating, but gave Hawley some "creative leeway" due to his previous work, and praised Stevens. He ultimately felt the episode's "visually spectacular style amplifies its substance", which he felt was superior to the similarly stylish series The Young Pope.

Writing for IndieWire, Ben Travers praised the episode for combining elements of science fiction, romance, comedy, action, and horror while still focusing on David, and for its artistry which he called "atypical of superhero stories ... and at least on par with the best design on TV." Travers was also positive about the elements that embraced the series comic origins, namely the climactic action sequence, which he thought would remain in the mind of viewers even more than the rest of the episode. At The Hollywood Reporter, Tim Goodman called the "trippy" episode "a boldly rewarding dissociated narrative that's both weirdly compelling and deeply confusing", praising the decision to not introduce the audience to a 'normal life' first. Goodman called Hawley's "visual stamp" essential to the success of the episode. Alex McCown-Levy of The A.V. Club graded the episode a 'B+', finding it dense but also "not shy about exploring odd little tangents and asides that aren't necessarily part of some larger scheme. That playfulness is freeing".

The Washington Post's Hank Stuever complained that the series was just another that "indulges in a great deal of jerking back and forth between past and present, as well as real and imaginary", but did feel that the episode told that story "beautifully". David Sims at The Atlantic praised the episode's design and Hawley's directing as striking, saying the choreography was truly cinematic. However, Sims felt this was an example of a "spectacular" pilot that was designed to hide a lack of story, and described the episode's use of an unreliable narrator as "a tiresome viewing experience."

=== Accolades ===
Year	Award	Category	Recipient	Result	Ref.
2017	Camerimage International Film Festival	First Look – TV Pilots Competition	Dana Gonzales	Nominated	
2018	ASC Awards	Outstanding Achievement in Cinematography in Regular Series for Commercial Television	Dana Gonzales	Nominated	
2018	Visual Effects Society Awards	Outstanding Visual Effects in a Photoreal Episode	John Ross, Eddie Bonin, Sebastian Bergeron, Lionel Lim, Paul Benjamin	Nominated	
