= Chapter 2 (Legion) =

- Legion episode
- Episode no.: Season 1 Episode 2
- Directed by: Michael Uppendahl
- Written by: Noah Hawley
- Cinematography by: Dana Gonzales
- Editing by: Regis Kimble
- Production code: XLN01002
- Original air date: February 15, 2017
- Running time: 49 minutes

Episode chronology
← Previous "Chapter 1"	Next → "Chapter 3"
- Legion season 1

"Chapter 2" is the second episode of the first season of the American surrealist superhero thriller television series Legion, based on the Marvel Comics character of the same name. The episode was written by series creator Noah Hawley and directed by co-executive producer Michael Uppendahl. It originally aired on FX on February 15, 2017.

The series follows David Haller, a "mutant" diagnosed with schizophrenia at a young age. Struggling to differentiate reality from fantasy, he tries to control his mutant powers and combat the sinister forces trying to control him. In the episode, David's new team helps him in delving into his memories, in an attempt to master his powers.

According to Nielsen Media Research, the episode was seen by an estimated 1.13 million household viewers and gained a 0.5 ratings share among adults aged 18–49. The episode received extremely positive reviews from critics, who praised the performances, visual style and directing, although some expressed criticism for the pacing.

== Plot ==
David is taken to Summerland, a facility belonging to Melanie. The facility helps mutants in training and controlling their powers, as well as to protect them from Division 3, a government agency that hunts them down.

David then begins a process known as "memory work", where he and the team enter his mind to relive his childhood memories, aided by Ptonomy Wallace, a memory artist. The process involves David facing many challenges from his memories, including feeling haunted by a children's book his father read to him, The World's Angriest Boy in the World, in which the title character murders his mother. Ptonomy transfers him out of the memories, revealing that he can remember everything, even before he was born. Later, Syd apologizes to David for the chaos in Clockworks and killing Lenny.

David is then subjected to an MRI scan, with the supervision of Cary Loudermilk, a mutant who co-exists in one body with a woman named Kerry. The team delves more into David's memories, which include David and Lenny using drugs or a fragmented meeting with his psychiatrist, Dr. Henry Poole. During the scan, David hears his sister Amy calling for him. He realizes that this voice belongs to a present-day event, where Amy is looking for him at Clockworks.

David tries to contact Amy, who appears to hear him as well. As she leaves, she is detained by Division 3 agents. While Cary leaves the room, David is haunted by the Devil with Yellow Eyes. In his panic, he accidentally teleports the MRI scanner outside the room, destroying it. David prepares to leave Summerland and save Amy, only to be stopped by Syd. She convinces him to stay to control his powers, stating that Amy will be safe. Amy finds herself in an undisclosed location, when a Division 3 agent known as the Eye enters, saying "shall we begin?"

== Production ==
=== Development ===
In January 2017, it was reported that the second episode of the season would be titled "Chapter 2", and was to be directed by co-executive producer Michael Uppendahl and written by series creator Noah Hawley. This was Hawley's 2nd writing credit, and Uppendahl's first directing credit.

== Reception ==
=== Viewers ===
In its original American broadcast, "Chapter 2" was seen by an estimated 1.13 million household viewers and gained a 0.5 ratings share among adults aged 18–49, according to Nielsen Media Research. This means that 0.5 percent of all households with televisions watched the episode. This was a 31% decrease in viewership from the previous episode, which was watched by 1.62 million viewers with a 0.7 in the 18-49 demographics.

With DVR factored in, the episode was watched by 2.91 million viewers with a 1.3 in the 18-49 demographics.

=== Critical reviews ===
"Chapter 2" received extremely positive reviews from critics. The review aggregator website Rotten Tomatoes reported a 90% approval rating with an average rating of 7.8/10 for the episode, based on 20 reviews. The site's consensus states: "Shifting in tone from the visually arresting and uninhibited premiere, 'Chapter 2' slows things down a bit by establishing pieces of David's story and the rules of his universe."

Scott Collura of IGN gave the episode a "great" 8.5 out of 10 and wrote in his verdict, "After the tour de force that was last week's pilot episode, 'Chapter 2' of Legion can't help but be somewhat underwhelming in comparison. But still, it does a lot to stabilize the craziness of last week and fill in some questions - while also launching a bunch more."

Alex McLevy of The A.V. Club gave the episode a "B+" grade and wrote, "What makes Legion's strategy in 'Chapter 2' so brilliant is that this is true for all of us. You don't need telepathic powers to find yourself unsettled by your own past, or wondering how new information changes how you perceive yourself."

Alan Sepinwall of Uproxx wrote, "Overall, though, 'Chapter 2' felt more necessary than inspired, moving forward the story - including David's sister Amy being taken captive by the Eye and his goons - and establishing various rules so that we'll better understand when they get broken." Ben Travers of IndieWire gave the episode an "A-" grade and wrote, "As the elegantly structured episode progressed, David was brought up as the key to winning the war, and we, along with David, descended further and further into madness."

Kevin P. Sullivan of Entertainment Weekly wrote, "While the premiere of FX's Legion impressed with its technical craft by exploring perception, the second episode manages to nearly outdo it by examining memory." Oliver Sava of Vulture gave the episode a 3 star rating out of 5 and wrote, "Color has played a huge part in the storytelling so far, and director Michael Uppendahl and cinematographer Dana Gonzales... are taking advantage of Legion's comic-book foundation to give the series a vivid, highly evocative color palette." Sean T. Collins of The New York Times wrote, "To a limited degree, the show is capable of wonder and terror alike. Thanks in large part to the quiet and confident performances of Jean Smart and Jeremie Harris as Melanie Bird and Ptonomy Wallace, David Haller's sojourn."

Ron Gilmer of TV Fanatic gave the episode a 4.8 star rating out of 5 and wrote, "The tone of this one is much different than the wild, visually stunning Legion premiere, but it's just as trippy in its own way." Katherine Siegel of Paste gave the episode a 8.0 rating out of 10 and wrote, "Change the pace, though, and you are — like it or not — no longer adhering to the rules by which 'Chapter 1' and its influences operate. You have to accept that you're starting a whole new game, stylistically speaking—a game for which the Legion team, this week at least, seemed less than entirely prepared."
