= Chapter 3 (Legion) =

- Legion episode
- Episode no.: Season 1 Episode 3
- Directed by: Michael Uppendahl
- Written by: Peter Calloway
- Cinematography by: Dana Gonzales
- Editing by: Curtis Thurber
- Production code: XLN01003
- Original air date: February 22, 2017
- Running time: 44 minutes

Guest appearances
- Scott Lawrence as Dr. Henry Poole; David Selby as Brubaker

Episode chronology
| ← Previous "Chapter 2" | Next → "Chapter 4" |
- Legion season 1

"Chapter 3" is the third episode of the first season of the American surrealist superhero thriller television series Legion, based on the Marvel Comics character of the same name. The episode was written by co-executive producer Peter Calloway and directed by co-executive producer Michael Uppendahl. It originally aired on FX on February 22, 2017.

The series follows David Haller, a "mutant" diagnosed with schizophrenia at a young age, as he tries to control his psychic powers and combat the sinister forces trying to control him. In the episode, David tries to access part of his memories for the team, which may lead to understanding more about his powers.

According to Nielsen Media Research, the episode was seen by an estimated 1.04 million household viewers and gained a 0.5 ratings share among adults aged 18–49. The episode received extremely positive reviews from critics, who praised the performances, character development and cinematography, although some criticized the pacing.

== Plot ==
David continues memory work with Ptonomy and Melanie. This time, they relive the kitchen incident. Going back a few minutes before the event, Ptonomy and Melanie find that the event was caused after David was caught by his girlfriend, Philly, using drugs with Lenny.

The memory is disrupted when David sees the Devil with Yellow Eyes. Ptonomy and Melanie are surprised, although they can't see the Devil with Yellow Eyes. They are then suddenly teleported out of the memories and wind up in a different room of Summerland, an accidental display of David's powers. Later, while undergoing a scan, he is haunted by a memory where he saw the title character from The World's Angriest Boy in the World when he was young. David then hallucinates an encounter with Lenny, who taunts him about his sister's status. Syd enters the room to help David, but his powers cause them to teleport away from the room.

David and Syd appear as astral projections in a room where Amy is being questioned. The Eye appears to see them but they vanish before he can touch them. After they return to Summerland, Melanie states that the Eye is a mutant named Walter, who co-founded Summerland with her and her husband Oliver but was let go after they saw a destructive nature in him. In order to enter David's locked memories, Ptonomy, Melanie and Syd enter his mind while they sedate him, accompanied by a child version of David. They witness his psychiatry session, where Syd is able to see the room trembling, but Ptonomy and Melanie can't see anything.

Ptonomy finds himself unable to take them out of David's mind. Young David flees through the memories of his childhood home, with Syd chasing after him. Syd eventually sees that they are being followed by a manifestation of the title character from The World's Angriest Boy in the World, which then transforms into the Devil with Yellow Eyes. Hiding in a vent, Syd tries to get the young David to wake up. Syd manages to wake up in the real world and also wakes up Ptonomy, but David and Melanie are unable to do so. Melanie wanders through the house and is about to be attacked by the Devil with Yellow Eyes when she wakes up in a panic. David, unable to wake up, is tormented by the voices.

== Production ==
=== Development ===
In January 2017, it was reported that the third episode of the season would be titled "Chapter 3", and was to be directed by co-executive producer Michael Uppendahl and written by co-executive producer Peter Calloway. This was Calloway's first writing credit, and Uppendahl's second directing credit.

== Reception ==
=== Viewers ===
In its original American broadcast, "Chapter 3" was seen by an estimated 1.04 million household viewers and gained a 0.5 ratings share among adults aged 18–49, according to Nielsen Media Research. This means that 0.5 percent of all households with televisions watched the episode. This was a 8% decrease in viewership from the previous episode, which was watched by 1.13 million viewers with a 0.5 in the 18-49 demographics.

With DVR factored in, the episode was watched by 2.49 million viewers with a 1.2 in the 18-49 demographics.

=== Critical reviews ===
"Chapter 3" received extremely positive reviews from critics. The review aggregator website Rotten Tomatoes reported a 94% approval rating with an average rating of 8.1/10 for the episode, based on 18 reviews. The site's consensus states: "'Chapter 3' successfully synthesizes the stunning visual style and compelling narrative of its predecessors into a solid and entertaining third episode."

Scott Collura of IGN gave the episode a "great" 8.2 out of 10 and wrote in his verdict, "Legion continues to be stylistically impressive, and its central story involving what's really going on with David remains intriguing. But the show will need to get out of Summerland and the memory work sessions soon in order to avoid getting repetitive."

Alex McLevy of The A.V. Club gave the episode an "A-" grade and wrote, "'Chapter 3' is a sharp integration of backstory and adrenaline-laced narrative, creating more intense stakes for our heroes even as they plunge deeper into the morass of David's memories."

Alan Sepinwall of Uproxx wrote, "When I watched 'Chapter 2', it felt like such a comedown from the premiere that I worried Legion simply couldn't sustain itself. But this episode was such an effective blend of what made the premiere magical with the more sustainable parts of the second episode, that I'm all in for whatever comes next." Kevin P. Sullivan of Entertainment Weekly wrote, "You know you're talking about an interesting show when the most straightforward episode to date culminates in an Inception-style group dream in which an obese demon creature stalks our heroes." Oliver Sava of Vulture gave the episode a 3 star rating out of 5 and wrote, "It's possible that the more accessible storytelling is a reflection of David getting comfortable at Summerland, and it makes me wonder if 'Chapter Three' is intentionally basic to set a point of contrast for strangeness to come."

Sean T. Collins of The New York Times wrote, "After two scatterbrained episodes... the show now seems ready to get on with the business of making this superhuman a superhero." Ron Gilmer of TV Fanatic gave the episode a 4.5 star rating out of 5 and wrote, "The pace slows even more in 'Chapter 3', but the mind bending trippiness doesn't let up one bit." Katherine Siegel of Paste gave the episode a 8.5 rating out of 10 and wrote, "Legion asks us to consider existence on a larger scale — where a memory can very much hurt us, or maybe what we think is a memory isn't. The series has depth and, dare I say it, soul. It's not television as usual. Not television as usual at all."
