= Chapter 5 (Legion) =

- Legion episode
- Episode no.: Season 1 Episode 5
- Directed by: Tim Mielants
- Written by: Peter Calloway
- Cinematography by: Dana Gonzales
- Editing by: Regis Kimble
- Production code: XLN01005
- Original air date: March 8, 2017
- Running time: 52 minutes

Guest appearance
- David Selby as Brubaker

Episode chronology
← Previous "Chapter 4"	Next → "Chapter 6"
- Legion season 1

"Chapter 5" is the fifth episode of the first season of the American surrealist superhero thriller television series Legion, based on the Marvel Comics character of the same name. The episode was written by co-executive producer Peter Calloway and directed by Tim Mielants. It originally aired on FX on March 8, 2017.

The series follows David Haller, a "mutant" diagnosed with schizophrenia at a young age, as he tries to control his psychic powers and combat the sinister forces trying to control him. In the episode, David sets out to save Amy from Division 3, although his motivations are pushed by Lenny.

According to Nielsen Media Research, the episode was seen by an estimated 0.795 million household viewers and gained a 0.4 ratings share among adults aged 18–49. The episode received critical acclaim, with critics praising the cinematography, character development, performances (particularly Dan Stevens) and ending.

== Plot ==
Kerry is taken to Summerland, where Cary takes care of her wounds until she wakes up. David shows Syd that he created an illusion where both can spend time together and not worry about her powers, thanks to his knowledge of the astral plane.

David tells Melanie that he intends to leave the next day to save his sister, also telling her that he met Oliver in the astral plane. Melanie explains that Oliver has spent 21 years in the plane, and asks David to help him return to the real world. Motivated by Lenny, David leaves for Division 3 earlier and alone. Syd asks the team to help her, although Ptonomy does not see the point but Melanie reaffirms that they will help David.

The team arrives at Division 3, where the soldiers have been massacred and the compound has been raided. The team finds a dying Brubaker, who tells them that David left with Amy. Through security footage, they watch in horror as David brutally kills the soldiers at the compound. The footage also displays the Devil with Yellow Eyes, which Cary interprets as a parasite that lurked into David's mind and feed off David's powers. Syd is suddenly teleported to their astral room before departing once again for the real world. She deduces that David is at his childhood home. As they leave, Walter, the only survivor of the massacre, follows them.

At their childhood home, Amy is tormented by Lenny while David asks to know about his past. Amy reveals that David was adopted, but doesn't know who his real parents are. The team enters the house, which appears to remove sound as they wander through the house. Syd eventually finds Amy, but is confronted by Lenny, who restores sound and taunts her before disappearing. Walter enters and shoots at David, prompting him and Amy to vanish to their astral room. David feels powerless and unable to think. The Devil in Yellow Eyes appears and attacks Syd. In order to save her, David wills himself, the whole team and Walter to another astral plane where they are patients at Clockworks. Their psychiatrist is revealed to be Lenny.

== Production ==
=== Development ===
In February 2017, it was reported that the fifth episode of the season would be titled "Chapter 5", and was to be directed by Tim Mielants and written by co-executive producer Peter Calloway. This was Calloway's second writing credit, and Mielants' first directing credit.

=== Filming ===
The episode featured a sequence where David played "Rainbow Connection" on a banjo. Dan Stevens was required to play the instrument, despite having never done so before. He considered the episode to be one of his favorites, also praising director Tim Mielants as someone "who was just the right amount of crazy for our show. And there's some incredibly ambitious camerawork in that episode."

== Reception ==
=== Viewers ===
In its original American broadcast, "Chapter 5" was seen by an estimated 0.795 million household viewers and gained a 0.4 ratings share among adults aged 18–49, according to Nielsen Media Research. This means that 0.4 percent of all households with televisions watched the episode. This was a 6% increase in viewership from the previous episode, which was watched by 0.750 million viewers with a 0.4 in the 18-49 demographics.

=== Critical reviews ===
"Chapter 5" received critical acclaim. The review aggregator website Rotten Tomatoes reported a 100% approval rating with an average rating of 8.6/10 for the episode, based on 16 reviews. The site's consensus states: "The terrifying 'Chapter 5' sends Legion spinning upside down while thrillingly weaving threads of horror into the show's comics-inspired canvas."

Scott Collura of IGN gave the episode an "amazing" 9 out of 10 and wrote in his verdict, "As the final 10 minutes of Legion's 'Chapter 5' kicked in and things amped up with the conceit of all sound (aside from some music cues) being temporarily dispersed by David/Lenny, the episode proved itself to be another excellent installment that mixes style with intrigue. One supposes that Cary's magic collar will come to the rescue at some point, but for now it seems the more pressing issue is for our heroes to find their way back to reality... if they even exist at all, that is."

Alex McLevy of The A.V. Club gave the episode an "A-" grade and wrote, "Everyone in Legion believes in someone or something for different reasons, but they're all driven by that same hope, of finding what they want to see."

Alan Sepinwall of Uproxx wrote, "This was, like last week, Legion using every tool it had in service of a particular tone and narrative goal. Last time, it was a kind of baffling whimsy that ultimately gave us a much better handle on what David and the other characters can do, and what Melanie's goal in all of this is. Here, it was an increasingly dark and disturbing revelation of what David is really capable of, and what he and/or Lenny appear to truly be. Great. Terrifying. More, please." Kevin P. Sullivan of Entertainment Weekly wrote, "Legion does a lot of things well... but I think it's worth talking about more specifically after an episode like 'Chapter 5'. That is to say, after a startling, great episode of television like "Chapter 5."" Oliver Sava of Vulture gave the episode a 3 star rating out of 5 and wrote, "Legion is by no means a realistic or nuanced interpretation of schizophrenia, but the way it ties the main villain to the illness is fascinating."

Sean T. Collins of The New York Times wrote, "It's not just superheroes and horror that coexist on the show and among David's multiple personalities: The good show and the shaky one share a head space as well - ours." Ron Gilmer of TV Fanatic gave the episode a perfect 5 star rating out of 5 and wrote, "I loved this episode! The story is barreling forward, and the plot is much easier to follow. I can't wait to see how they escape Clockworks, and if the contraption Loudermilk came up with can help David regain control." Katherine Siegel of Paste gave the episode a 8 rating out of 10 and wrote, "Is David losing his innocence? Is everything he knows and loves being corrupted by the malevolent presence inside? Is that presence taking the pure, wholesome, positive parts of his childhood away from him? Guess what, audience, Legion needs to take something pure, wholesome and innocent from you, too. It's going to have to be The Muppets, I'm afraid, because no one wants to lose faith in the rainbow connection — not David, and definitely not you."

=== Accolades ===
TVLine named Dan Stevens as an honorable mention as the "Performer of the Week" for the week of March 11, 2017, for his performance in the episode. The site wrote, "As Legion's conflicted mutant David Haller, Dan Stevens has been stuck in his own mind (literally) most of the season. But this week, in 'Chapter 5', Stevens got to take David's massive telekinetic powers out for a spin — and have a little fun for once! Wearing a sly smile, David stormed through Division 3 laying waste to enemy soldiers, and Stevens made the mutant's newfound cockiness positively unnerving."
