= Chapter 7 (Legion) =

- Legion episode
- Episode no.: Season 1 Episode 7
- Directed by: Dennie Gordon
- Written by: Jennifer Yale
- Cinematography by: Dana Gonzales
- Editing by: Regis Kimble; Chris A. Peterson
- Production code: XLN01007
- Original air date: March 22, 2017
- Running time: 46 minutes

Guest appearances
- Jemaine Clement as Oliver Bird; Hamish Linklater as The Interrogator

Episode chronology
← Previous "Chapter 6"	Next → "Chapter 8"
- Legion season 1

"Chapter 7" is the seventh episode of the first season of the American surrealist superhero thriller television series Legion, based on the Marvel Comics character of the same name. The episode was written by co-producer Jennifer Yale and directed by Dennie Gordon. It originally aired on FX on March 22, 2017.

The series follows David Haller, a "mutant" diagnosed with schizophrenia at a young age, as he tries to control his psychic powers and combat the sinister forces trying to control him. In the episode, the team uncovers the truth behind the Devil with Yellow Eyes, while David struggles in breaking free from his mind.

According to Nielsen Media Research, the episode was seen by an estimated 0.716 million household viewers and gained a 0.4 ratings share among adults aged 18–49. The episode received critical acclaim, with critics praising the writing, character development, revelations, directing and performances.

== Plot ==
The Devil with Yellow Eyes, in the form of Lenny, questions Amy about her childhood, as well as David. The Devil with Yellow Eyes wants to know more about David's father, but also notes that Cary has left the hospital.

Oliver guides Cary to the astral plane, taking him to the ice cube. Oliver explains that the parasite that torments David is a mutant named Amahl Farouk, also known as the Shadow King. Farouk locked David inside his mind, intending to fully possess his body. Cary then recalls that his body in real life holds a device that could prevent Farouk from taking over David's body, but needs the whole team back into their respective bodies. Using Oliver's diving suit, Cary wakes up Syd from her coma in Clockworks and takes her to the astral plane to explain his plan. Syd is instructed to go back and save the team, also receiving special glasses to help differentiate reality and fantasy.

Melanie manages to reach the real world, where their bodies are stuck in time. She meets with Cary and Oliver, who does not recognize her. Trapped inside his mind in the form of a casket, David is helped by an iteration of his mind, who helps him understand his history with Farouk. David's biological father was a powerful mutant who defeated Farouk in the astral plane, making him lose his body. To protect David, his father put him in foster care, but Farouk eventually found him. Farouk intends to possess his body to get revenge at his father and eventually, conquer the world. With this knowledge, he breaks out of the corner and starts wandering throughout his mind.

Syd returns to Clockworks with the special glasses, which prevents her from seeing the hallucinations. She eventually finds Kerry, but both are attacked by Walter. Farouk in Lenny's form approaches them and mutilates Walter, who also dies in the real world. Seeing that Oliver is protecting David and Syd in the real world with a shield, Farouk leaves Clockworks to knock Oliver out and returns to Clockworks to finish killing Syd and Kerry. Oliver phases out while Walter's bullet approaches David and Syd, prompting Cary to put the device on David's head.

David breaks free from his mind in the hallucination, before the whole team returns to their respective bodies in his childhood home. David manages to catch the bullets in time with his hands, while Walter's body is mutilated like his death in Clockworks. They return to Summerland, with Cary explaining that the device will lock Farouk away inside David's mind. Melanie also discovers that Oliver has finally left the astral plane, although he still seems to not remember her. Amy also apologizes to David for not telling him about his real father. As the team intends to remove Farouk from David's mind, Division 3 agents storm Summerland and corner them, led by the interrogator. He orders his agents to kill everyone but David. Inside David's mind, Farouk is seen trapped inside a casket, the way David had been, screaming and pounding; the casket suddenly cracks.

== Production ==
=== Development ===
In February 2017, it was reported that the seventh episode of the season would be titled "Chapter 7", and was to be directed by Dennie Gordon and written by co-producer Jennifer Yale. This was Yale's first writing credit, and Gordon's first directing credit.

=== Filming ===
Dan Stevens played two characters in the episode: David Haller and David's mind in the form of his body. For the latter, Stevens used his natural British accent. While working on how to differentiate both halves, Stevens suggested to series creator Noah Hawley on using his natural accent, which he accepted, with Hawley saying "I guess deep down all of our rational selves are probably British". Stevens first shot the latter's scenes, before filming David's scenes, a process he deemed "challenging".

The episode introduced the existence of Charles Xavier, David Haller's biological father, by showing his wheelchair. The crew had access to any wheelchair used in the X-Men film series, settling on the wheelchair used by James McAvoy in X-Men: Apocalypse.

== Reception ==
=== Viewers ===
In its original American broadcast, "Chapter 7" was seen by an estimated 0.716 million household viewers and gained a 0.4 ratings share among adults aged 18–49, according to Nielsen Media Research. This means that 0.4 percent of all households with televisions watched the episode. This was a slight decrease in viewership from the previous episode, which was watched by 0.732 million viewers with a 0.3 in the 18-49 demographics.

With DVR factored in, the episode was watched by 2.04 million viewers with a 1.0 in the 18-49 demographics.

=== Critical reviews ===
"Chapter 7" received critical acclaim. The review aggregator website Rotten Tomatoes reported an 89% approval rating with an average rating of 8.2/10 for the episode, based on 18 reviews. The site's consensus states: "With the revelation of the series villain, 'Chapter 7' ties up a number of loose ends in preparation for the series finale - albeit in somewhat predictable fashion."

Scott Collura of IGN gave the episode an "amazing" 9.3 out of 10 and wrote in his verdict, "Legion continues to knock it out of the telepathic park as it heads to its big season finale next week, answering questions, dropping fan service in a unique and memorable way, and, with its 'Bolero' escapade, providing one of the coolest sequences to air on TV yet in 2017."

Alex McLevy of The A.V. Club gave the episode an "A-" grade and wrote, "Despite all that happens in 'Chapter 7' - the thrilling heroics, the tense and unsettling confrontations with Lenny, the deadly cliff-hanger ending - the most significant struggle, as always, is the one inside David's consciousness."

Alan Sepinwall of Uproxx wrote, "'Chapter 7' has to devote a lot of time to exposition... Fortunately, it's happening Legion-style... that it never feels like the story is grinding to a halt so that the characters can explain things to each other, and to us." Kevin P. Sullivan of Entertainment Weekly wrote, "Nothing about Legion so far would suggest that the end of the first season would be anything less than super satisfying, but watching the penultimate chapter of the arc was an utter delight."

Alex Abad-Santos of Vox wrote, "It's difficult to say whether 'Chapter 7', the latest episode of FX and Marvel's addictive TV collaboration Legion, is singlehandedly the best episode of superhero television this year because it's great or because it's satisfying." Oliver Sava of Vulture gave the episode a 3 star rating out of 5 and wrote, "'Chapter Seven' finally reveals the true identity of the series' villain, and as it dives deeper into X-Men comic-book mythology, it shifts into a storytelling mode that is more familiar to fans of that franchise."

Sean T. Collins of The New York Times wrote, "In the astral plane, plenty of people can hear you scream, as it turns out. But they can also see you trade on the ideas and images of others at the expense of creating your own." Nick Harley of Den of Geek wrote, "This episode covered a ton of ground, answered key questions, and provided everyone with meaningful action, barring a mostly absent Ptonomy. It's not an easy feat to explain and tidy up everything in an hour, especially a show as convoluted as this, but 'Chapter Seven' does so while maintaining Legion's unorthodox style and tone. I can't wait to see how this mind-bending season ends." Katherine Siegel of Paste gave the episode a 7 rating out of 10 and wrote, "This episode works best, exposition included, when focusing on David."
