= 2017 American Society of Cinematographers Awards =

Annual US film and television awards

32nd ASC Awards
- Date: February 17, 2018
- Site: Hollywood & Highland Ray Dolby Ballroom

Highlights
- Cinematography in Theatrical Releases: Blade Runner 2049

The 32nd American Society of Cinematographers Awards were held on February 17, 2018, at the Hollywood & Highland Ray Dolby Ballroom, honoring the best cinematographers of film and television in 2017.

The nominees for film and television were announced on January 9, 2018.

== Winners and nominees ==
=== board of directors Award ===
- Awarded to director and actress Angelina Jolie.

=== Film ===
==== Outstanding Achievement in Cinematography in Theatrical Release ====
- Roger Deakins, ASC, BSC – Blade Runner 2049
  - Bruno Delbonnel, ASC, AFC – Darkest Hour
  - Hoyte van Hoytema, ASC, FSF, NSC – Dunkirk
  - Dan Laustsen, ASC, DFF – The Shape of Water
  - Rachel Morrison, ASC – Mudbound

==== Spotlight Award ====
The Spotlight Award recognizes outstanding cinematography in features and documentaries that are typically screened at film festivals, in limited theatrical release, or outside the United States.

- Mart Taniel – November
  - Máté Herbai, HSC – On Body and Soul
  - Mikhail Krichman, RGC – Loveless

=== Television ===
==== Outstanding Achievement in Cinematography in Regular Series for Non-Commercial Television ====
- Adriano Goldman, ASC, ABC – The Crown (Episode: "Smoke and Mirrors") (Netflix)
  - Gonzalo Amat – The Man in the High Castle (Episode: "Land O’ Smiles") (Amazon)
  - Robert McLachlan, ASC, CSC – Game of Thrones (Episode: "The Spoils of War") (HBO)
  - Gregory Middleton, ASC, CSC – Game of Thrones (Episode: "Dragonstone") (HBO)
  - Alasdair Walker – Outlander (Episode: "The Battle Joined") (Starz)

==== Outstanding Achievement in Cinematography in Regular Series for Commercial Television ====
- Boris Mojsovski, CSC – 12 Monkeys (Episode: "Thief") (Syfy)
  - Dana Gonzales, ASC, ABC – Legion (Episode: "Chapter 1") (FX)
  - David Greene, ASC, CSC – 12 Monkeys (Episode: "Mother") (Syfy)
  - Kurt Jones – The Originals (Episode: "Bag of Cobras") (The CW)
  - Crescenzo Notarile, ASC – Gotham (Episode: "The Executioner") (Fox)

==== Outstanding Achievement in Cinematography in Television Movie, Miniseries, or Pilot ====
- Mathias Herndl, AAC – Genius (Episode: "Chapter 1") (National Geographic)
  - Pepe Avila del Pino – The Deuce (Episode: "Pilot") (HBO)
  - Serge Desrosiers, CSC – Sometimes the Good Kill (Lifetime)
  - Shelly Johnson, ASC – Training Day (Episode: "Apocalypse Now") (CBS)
  - Christopher Probst, ASC – Mindhunter (Episode: "Episode 1") (Netflix)

=== Other awards ===
- Lifetime Achievement Award: Russell Carpenter, ASC
- Career Achievement in Television: Alan Caso, ASC
- International Award: Russell Boyd, ASC, ACS
- Presidents Award: Stephen Lighthill, ASC
