= Michael Uppendahl =

American television and film director

- Other name: Mike Uppendahl
- Occupations: Film director, television director
- Years active: 1999–present

Michael Uppendahl is an American television and film director.

He is well known for his work on the AMC period drama Mad Men; the FX shows American Horror Story, Fargo, and Legion; and the Fox musical/dramedy Glee.

== Career ==
His first television credit came from directing 4 episodes of the CBS sitcom Becker, from 2003 to 2004. He wrote, directed and produced the 2009 short film A Hundred & Forty-Six Questions, starring Jamie Anne Allman.

Since 2008, Uppendahl has directed 7 episodes of the AMC drama Mad Men, for which he has received critical acclaim. In 2011 and 2012, Uppendahl joined the crews of Fox's Glee and FX's American Horror Story, directing 2 episodes of the former and 3 of the latter.

In 2013, Uppendahl made his feature film directorial debut with Grounded (formerly under the working title, Quad), a drama about a salesman that becomes a quadriplegic. It was co-written by Michael Burke, Mike Young, Robin Veith, and Brett Johnson. Jeff Daniels, Lena Olin, Aaron Paul, and Tom Berenger star. The film was later renamed Adam and released in 2020.

Uppendahl served as co-executive producer and director on the first season of Marvel's Legion; which aired on FX. The series centers on David Haller, possibly the most powerful mutant on the planet.

Uppendahl also worked on the video game L.A. Noire, where he served as the director for the game's cutscenes.

== Filmography ==
=== Television credits ===
Year	Title	Episode	Notes
2003	Becker	"Thank You for Not Smoking"	
2003	Becker	"Amanda Moves Out"	
2003	Becker	"The Unbelievable Wrongness of Talking"	
2004	Becker	"Snow Means Snow"	
2008	Mad Men	"Six Month Leave"	
2009	Mad Men	"The Arrangements"	
2009	Mad Men	"The Color Blue"	
2010	Mad Men	"Christmas Comes But Once a Year"	
2010	Mad Men	"The Beautiful Girls"	
2010	Weeds	"Pinwheels and Whirligigs"	season 6, episode 7
2011	American Horror Story: Murder House	"Piggy Piggy"	episode 6
2012	Mad Men	"At the Codfish Ball"	
2012	Mad Men	"Christmas Waltz"	
2012	Glee	"Choke"	season 3, episode 18
2012	Glee	"Glease"	season 4, episode 6
2012	Longmire	"The Dark Road"	season 1, episode 2
2012	American Horror Story: Asylum	"Nor'easter"	episode 3
2012	American Horror Story: Asylum	"I Am Anne Frank (Part 1)"	episode 4
2013	Ray Donovan	"Housewarming"	season 1, episode 6
2013	American Horror Story: Coven	"Fearful Pranks Ensue"	episode 4
2013	American Horror Story: Coven	"The Axeman Cometh"	episode 6
2013	Mad Men	"To Have and to Hold"	season 6, episode 4
2013	Mad Men	"The Crash"	season 6, episode 8
2013	The Walking Dead	"Live Bait"	season 4, episode 6
2014	Mad Men	"A Day's Work"	season 7, episode 2
2014	Turn: Washington's Spies	"Epiphany"	season 1, episode 5
2014	Ray Donovan	"Uber Ray"	season 2, episode 2
2014	Manhattan	"Acceptable Limits"	season 1, episode 6
2014	Ray Donovan	"Volchek"	season 2, episode 10
2014	Ray Donovan	"Rodef"	season 2, episode 11
2014	Ray Donovan	"The Captain"	season 2, episode 12
2014	American Horror Story: Freak Show	"Edward Mordrake (Part 1)"	episode 3
2014	American Horror Story: Freak Show	"Pink Cupcakes"	episode 5
2015	House of Lies	"He Didn't Mean That, Natalie Portman"	season 4, episode 8
2015	House of Lies	"We're Going to Build a Mothership and Rule the Universe"	season 4, episode 9
2015	Shameless	"South Side Rules"	season 5, episode 10
2015	Mad Men	"New Business"	season 7, episode 9
2015	Turn: Washington's Spies	"Providence"	season 2, episode 8
2015	Ray Donovan	"Tulip"	season 3, episode 8
2015	Fargo	"Waiting for Dutch"	season 2, episode 1
2015	Scream Queens	"Seven Minutes in Hell"	season 1, episode 6
2015	Fargo	"The Myth of Sisyphus"	season 2, episode 3
2015	Fargo	"Fear and Trembling"	season 2, episode 4
2015	Scream Queens	"Mommie Dearest"	season 1, episode 8
2015	Scream Queens	"Ghost Stories"	season 1, episode 9
2015	Manhattan	"Brooklyn"	season 2, episode 9
2015	American Horror Story: Hotel	"She Wants Revenge"	episode 9
2016	American Horror Story: Hotel	"Battle Royale"	episode 11
2016	Daredevil	"Guilty as Sin"	season 2, episode 8
2016	Fear the Walking Dead	"Blood in the Streets"	season 2, episode 4
2017	Legion	"Chapter 2"	season 1, episode 2
2017	Legion	"Chapter 3"	season 1, episode 3
2017	Legion	"Chapter 8"	season 1, episode 8
2018	Castle Rock	"Severance"	season 1, episode 1
2018	Castle Rock	"Habeas Corpus"	season 1, episode 2
2018	Castle Rock	"The Box"	season 1, episode 4
2019	The Hot Zone	"Arrival"	season 1, episode 1
2019	The Hot Zone	"Cell H"	season 1, episode 2
2019	The Hot Zone	"Hidden"	season 1, episode 6
2020	Hunters	"The Jewish Question"	season 1, episode 8
2020	Hunters	"Eliu v' Eliu"	season 1, episode 10
2020	Ratched	"Angel of Mercy: Part Two"	season 1, episode 4
2020	Ratched	"The Dance"	season 1, episode 5
2020	Fargo	"East/West"	season 4, episode 9
2021	American Crime Story	"The President Kissed Me"	season 3, episode 2
2021	American Crime Story	"Not to Be Believed"	season 3, episode 3
2021	American Crime Story	"The Assassination of Monica Lewinsky"	season 3, episode 7
2021	American Crime Story	"The Wilderness"	season 3, episode 10
2022	Candy	"Friday The 13th"	season 1, episode 1
2022	Candy	"The Fight"	season 1, episode 5
2023	Mayfair Witches	"The Witching Hour"	season 1, episode 1
2023	Mayfair Witches	"The Dark Place"	season 1, episode 2
2024	The Decameron	"The Beautiful, Not-Infected Countryside"	season 1, episode 1
2024	The Decameron	"Holiday State of Mind"	season 1, episode 2
2024	The Decameron	"This is Awful, And You'll Never Recover"	season 1, episode 7
2024	The Decameron	"We've Had A Good Cry"	season 1, episode 8
2024	Monsters: The Lyle and Erik Menendez Story	"The Hurt Man"	season 2, episode 5
2024	Monsters: The Lyle and Erik Menendez Story	"Showtime"	season 2, episode 7
2024	Monsters: The Lyle and Erik Menendez Story	"Hang Men"	season 2, episode 9
2024	American Sports Story: Aaron Hernandez	"Who Killed Aaron Hernandez?"	season 1, episode 10
2025	The Twisted Tale of Amanda Knox	"Amanda"	season 1, episode 1
2025	The Twisted Tale of Amanda Knox	"Ci vediamo piu tardi"	season 1, episode 2
2026	The Beauty	"Beautiful Patient Zero"	season 1, episode 6
2026	The Beauty	"Beautiful Living Rooms"	season 1, episode 7
2026	The Beauty	"Beautiful Brothers"	season 1, episode 8
2026	The Beauty	"Beautiful Beauty Day"	season 1, episode 10
2026	The Beauty	"Beautiful Betrayal"	season 1, episode 11
2026	The Shards	"Don't You Want Me"	season 1, episode 2
2026	The Shards	"Help Me! Rhonda!"	season 1, episode 3
2026	The Shards	"Stairway to Heaven"	season 1, episode 9
