= Craig Wrobleski =

Canadian cinematographer

Craig Wrobleski is a Canadian cinematographer, best known for his work on the television series Fargo, Legion, and The Umbrella Academy.

== Career ==
After graduating from the Broadcasting Program at Mount Royal College in Calgary, Craig Wrobleski started working as a studio cameraman at CFCN Television. After leaving CFCN, he worked on many independent productions, often volunteering his time to learn about the world of dramatic production and build relationships. This led to opportunities to get behind the camera for documentaries. Craig's documentary work took him all over North America and Europe for films including Chrome Dreams (a 4-part history of the automobile), The Geometry of Love (based on the book by Margaret Visser and shot in Rome and Toronto), God's Explorers (a feature length doc about Jesuit missionaries in Northern Canada) and Hitman Hart; Wrestling with Shadows. Wrobleski also served as a camera operator for the cycling events at the 1994 Commonwealth Games in Victoria, BC.

Wrobleski has also worked on numerous commercials, music videos, and live concerts over the years, producing content for MTV, MuchMusic, CMT, CBC, and PBS. He also shot Balletlujah! a dance collaboration between K.D. Lang, Joni Mitchell, and the Alberta Ballet.

As an entree into dramatic storytelling, Wrobleski shot award-winning short dramatic shorts and took on second unit photography for numerous television and feature projects including Man in the Mirror: The Michael Jackson Story, as well as the television mini- series Human Trafficking, which took him to the Czech Republic and Thailand.

His first long-form dramatic cinematography roles were for TV movies including Northern Lights and the feature films 45 RPM and Rufus. In 2010, he started working as cinematographer on the internationally popular Canadian television drama Heartland. Second Unit work on the award-winning first season of the FX television series Fargo led to Wrobleski working alongside fellow cinematographer Dana Gonzales on the acclaimed second and third seasons of Fargo as well as the revolutionary FX series Legion, alternating DP duties with Dana on an episode-by-episode basis. Craig's series work continued with the 11th season of the legendary series The X-Files, the re-boot of the groundbreaking Twilight Zone, two seasons of the hit Netflix series The Umbrella Academy and an episode of the visionary Amazon series Tales From the Loop. In 2019, Wrobleski photographed the feature film adaptation of the Stephen King/Joe Hill short story In the Tall Grass for Netflix.

== Awards ==
Craig's work on the "Blurryman" episode of Twilight Zone earned him an ASC Award Nomination in 2020. The "Swedish Job" episode of The Umbrella Academy was a winner at the 2021 CSC Awards and the "Stasis" episode of Tales From the Loop was nominated. The Umbrella Academy and In the Tall Grass were both nominated for CSC Awards in 2020. The Fargo "Who Rules the Land of Denial" episode garnered a win at the 2019 CSC Awards in addition to a CSC win in 2011 for the short film "June". Other projects nominated for CSC Awards included the short film Synthesis and Fargo "Fear and Trembling". Over the years, Craig has been the recipient of the Alberta Media Production Industries Association Rosie Award 16 times in various categories.

== Filmography ==
=== Television ===
TV movies

Year	Title	Director
2002	Blue Rodeo: Palace of Gold	Joel Stewart
2005	Stepping in It	Eppo Eerkes
2006	I Dream of Murder	Neill Fearnley
2007	Don't Cry Now	Jason Priestley
2007	Hush Little Baby	Holly Dale
2007	Lost Holiday: The Jim & Suzanne Shemwell Story	Gregory Goodell
2008	Love Sick: Secrets of a Sex Addict	Grant Harvey
2008	The Other Woman	Jason Priestley
2008	Confessions of a Go-Go Girl	Grant Harvey
2009	Northern Lights	Mike Robe
2009	Held Hostage	Grant Harvey
2010	Athletes in Motion	Mark Adam; Miryam Bouchard; Cam Christiansen
2014	The Dorm	Rachel Talalay

TV series

Year	Title	Director	Notes
2010-2016	Heartland		104 episodes
2015-2017	Fargo	Michael Uppendahl; Keith Gordon; Mike Barker	8 episodes
2016	Zoo		6 episodes
2017	Legion	Larysa Kondracki; Hiro Murai; Michael Uppendahl	3 episodes
2018	The X-Files		10 episodes
2019	The Twilight Zone	Greg Yaitanes; Richard Shepard; Christina Choe; Simon Kinberg	4 episodes
2019-2022	The Umbrella Academy	Ellen Kuras; Jeremy Webb; Stephen Surjik; Cheryl Dunye; Jeff King; Kate Woods	14 episodes
2020	Tales from the Loop	Dearbhla Walsh	Episode "Stasis"

=== Feature films ===
Year	Title	Director
2012	Rufus	Dave Schultz
2008	Bootcamp	Christian Duguay
2008	45 R.P.M.	Dave Schultz
2006	Dream Makers	Susan Cardinal
2019	In the Tall Grass	Vincenzo Natali
2021	The Unholy	Evan Spiliotopoulos
