= List of demons in fiction =

This is a list of notable demons that appear in works of fiction, not limited to writing or to entertainment purposes. For example, some are from video games and some are from Dante Alighieri's Inferno (from the Divine Comedy).

List of theological demons covers those from religion, theology, demonology, and mythology; the sacred and its study.

Names of God, list of deities, and list of fictional deities cover God and gods in various ways. List of legendary creatures may also help explain what is not here.

Some demons may be in both the fictional and theological lists. Many demons have names with several spellings but few are listed under more than one spelling.

Every listing should include a parenthetical reference, usually one with a blue link.

== A ==
- Aamon (Devilman Crybaby)
- Aatrox (League of Legends)
- Abaddon (multiple works)
- Abaddon (Haunted Hotel)
- Abalam (The Last Exorcism)
- Abby Saja (KPop Demon Hunters)
- Abi (Devilman)
- Abraxas (multiple works)
- Adramahlihk (Divinity: Original Sin 2)
- Adversary, (The Binding of Isaac: Rebirth)
- Agira (Devilman)
- Agrith-Naar (RuneScape)
- Aguilar (Devilman)
- Agwel (Devilman)
- Aion (Chrono Crusade)
- Akira Fudo (Devilman)
- Akaza (Demon Slayer: Kimetsu no Yaiba)
- Aku (Samurai Jack)
- Alastair (Supernatural TV series)
- Alastor (Dark-Hunter book series)
- Alastor (Hazbin Hotel)
- Alastor (Painkiller video game series)
- Algaliarept (Kim Harrison, Hollows print series)
- Alichino (Dante's Inferno)
- Alien Empera (Ultraman Mebius, Ultra Series)
- Amaimon (Blue Exorcist)
- Amel (The Vampire Chronicles)
- Amon (Devilman)
- Amon (StarCraft)
- Anatas (Evil U.S. TV show)
- Andariel (Diablo series)
- Andrealphus (Helluva Boss)
- Andurium (Jonathan Harker novels)
- Angel Dust (Hazbin Hotel)
- Annabelle (The Conjuring Universe)
- Anthony (Supernatural TV series)
- Anyanka (Buffy the Vampire Slayer TV series)
- Anzu (Sarah Rees Brennan, The Demon's Lexicon)
- Aogami (Shin Megami Tensei V)
- Apophis (Chilling Adventures of Sabrina)
- Apostles (Berserk)
- Arachnotron (Doom video game series)
- Archimonde (Warcraft series)
- Archvile (Doom video game series)
- Argosax (Devil May Cry 2)
- Arlon (Devilman)
- Artery (Darren Shan, The Demonata)
- Ashtar (Catherine)
- Asmodeus (multiple works)
- Asmodeus/"Ozzie" (Helluva Boss)
- Asmodeus (Obey Me)
- Asmoth (Strange)
- Astaroth (multiple works)
- Asura (Soul Eater manga)
- Aurora (Devilman)
- Azal (Doctor Who TV series)
- Azal (Strange)
- Azazeal (Hex TV series)
- Azazel (multiple works)
- Azazello (Mikhail Bulgakov, The Master and Margarita)
- Azmodan (Diablo and Heroes of the Storm)
- Azrael (Dogma)

== B ==
- Baal (multiple works)
- Babau (Dungeons & Dragons fantasy game)
- Baby Saja (KPop Demon Hunters)
- Bacarra (Charmed TV series)
- Backbeard (GeGeGe no Kitaro 2018)
- Bad Ash (The Evil Dead films)
- Baghuul (Sinister and Sinister 2)
- Bahumat (Fablehaven series)
- Bai Tza (Jackie Chan Adventures TV series)
- Bal'lak the Pummeller (RuneScape online role-playing game)
- Balnazzar (World of Warcraft franchise)
- Balor (Dungeons & Dragons fantasy game)
- Balrogs (J. R. R. Tolkien's The Silmarillion and The Lord of the Rings)
- Balthazae (Buffy the Vampire Slayer TV series)
- Balthazar (Charmed TV series)
- Balthazar (Constantine)
- Bambadjan (The Good Place)
- The Banshee (Strange)
- Baphomet (Doom video game series)
- Barakiel (Lineage II)
- Barbariccia (Dante's Inferno)
- Barbas (Charmed TV series)
- Barbatos (Obey Me)
- Baron of Hell (Doom video game series)
- Bartel (Chilling Adventures of Sabrina)
- Barthamus (Supernatural TV series)
- Bartimaeus (Jonathan Stroud, Bartimaeus Trilogy)
- Batibat (Chilling Adventures of Sabrina)
- Bat'Zul (City of Villains)
- Bawoo (Devilman)
- Baxter (Hazbin Hotel)
- Mrs. Baylock (The Omen)
- Bearded Demon (Supernatural TV series)
- The Beast (Doctor Who)
- The Beast (Over the Garden Wall)
- Behemoth (Mikhail Bulgakov, The Master and Margarita)
- Be'lakor the Dark Master and other Daemons (Rick Priestley, Warhammer tabletop games)
- Beelzeboss (Tenacious D in The Pick of Destiny)
- Beelzebub (multiple works)
- Beelzebub (Demon Lord Dante)
- Beelzebub (Helltaker)
- Beelzebub/"Bee" (Helluva Boss)
- Beelzebub (Obey Me)
- Beelzebub (Umineko When They Cry)
- Beezy J. Heinous (Jimmy Two Shoes)
- Bela (Devilman)
- Beleth (Lineage II)
- Belfagor (Belfagor arcidiavolo by Machiavelli)
- Belial (Diablo series)
- Beliafon (Spawn)
- Belphegor (Obey Me)
- Belphegor (Umineko When They Cry)
- Belphegor (Supernatural)
- Belthazor (Charmed TV series)
- Bendy (Bendy)
- Berial (Devil May Cry 4)
- Berry and Cherry (Sanrio, Lloromannic fantasy world), a.k.a. the Devilish Demon Duo
- Betra (Devilman)
- Big Horn (The Binding of Isaac: Afterbirth+)
- Bill Cipher (Gravity Falls)
- Black Hat (Villainous)
- Blackheart (Marvel Comics)
- Blades (Devil May Cry)
- Blitzo (Helluva Boss)
- Bojack (Dragon Ball Z: Bojack Unbound)
- The Boogeyman, (Boogeyman)
- BSD Daemon a.k.a. Beastie (Berkeley Software Distribution)
- Brady (Supernatural TV series)
- Bugo (Devilman)

== C ==
- Cacodemon (Doom video game series)
- Cadaver (Darren Shan, The Demonata)
- Cagnazzo (Dante's Inferno)
- Cain (Supernatural TV show)
- Calcabrina (Dante's Inferno)
- Calcifer (Diana Wynne Jones, Howl's Moving Castle)
- Calux (Truth or Dare (2018 film))
- Cameron Briel (Lauren Kate Fallen series)
- Canterbury (Kuroshitsuji)
- Captain Hatch (Being Human)
- Carmilla Carmine (Hazbin Hotel)
- Casanova (Scarlet Cherie: Vampire Series)
- Casey (Supernatural TV series)
- Castor (Jonathan Stroud, Bartimaeus Trilogy)
- Cat Head (Fionn mac Cumhaill)
- Catch (Christopher Moore, Practical Demonkeeping and Lamb)
- Catherine (Catherine)
- Cecily (Supernatural TV series)
- Cerberus, Guardian of Hell (Ultrakill)
- Chaos Gods (Warhammer Fantasy and Warhammer 40,000)
- Charlie (Charlie Charlie Challenge, The Gallows)
- Charlie Morningstar (Hazbin Hotel)
- The Checkered Demon
- Cheogh (Blood)
- Chernabog (Disney, Fantasia movie)
- Cherri Bomb (Hazbin Hotel)
- Cherry (Sanrio character); see Berry & Cherry
- Chris Baker (The Good Place)
- Christian Campbell (Supernatural TV series)
- Chrono (Chrono Crusade)
- Chthon (Quake game)
- Chzo (Chzo Mythos adventure game series)
- Ciel Phantomhive (Kuroshitsuji)
- Ciriatto (Dante's Inferno)
- Claude Faustus (Kuroshitsuji)
- Clavicus Vile (The Elder scrolls V: Skyrim)
- Cliff Ghasts (His Dark Materials)
- Clockwork devils (His Dark Materials)
- Clöyne (Clown)
- Cogliostro (Spawn)
- Cole Turner (Charmed TV series)
- Cordelia Chase (Angel TV series)
- Costa Burra, the Death Coach (Strange)
- Courtney (Dead End: Paranormal Park)
- Cow Head (Japanese mythology)
- The Creeper (Jeepers Creepers)
- Crimson (Helluva Boss)
- The Crimson King (Stephen King Dark Tower series)
- The Crone (Charmed TV series)
- The Crossroads Demon (Supernatural TV series)
- Crowley (Neil Gaiman and Terry Pratchett, Good Omens)
- Crowley (Supernatural TV series)
- Lord Crum (Conan the Destroyer)
- Cryto (Charmed TV series)
- C.W. Saturn (from Elliot S. Maggin's 1981 Superman novel, Miracle Monday)
- Cyberdemon/Harbinger of Doom (Doom video game series, Wolfenstein RPG)

== D ==
- D'Hoffryn (Buffy the Vampire Slayer TV series)
- Dabura (Dragon Ball Z)
- Daddy Dearest (Friday Night Funkin')
- Dagda Mor (Elfstones of Shannara)
- Dagon (Supernatural TV series)
- Dahak (Xena: Warrior Princess)
- Dai Gui (Jackie Chan Adventures TV series)
- Daimon Hellstrom (Marvel Comics), a.k.a. Hellstorm and the Son of Satan
- Dai Shi (Power Rangers Jungle Fury)
- Daki (Demon Slayer: Kimetsu no Yaiba)
- Damien Thorn (The Omen film series)
- The Dancing Pig (Le cochon danseur)
- Dante (Demon Lord Dante)
- Dante (Devil May Cry series)
- Deimon (Tabaluga) (Tabaluga und das leuchtende Schweigen)
- Darkar (Winx Club)
- Dark Heart (Care Bears Movie II: A New Generation)
- Dark Lord Hum Gree (WarioWare Gold)
- Dark Mind (Kirby & the Amazing Mirror)
- Dark Nebula (Kirby: Squeak Squad)
- Dark One (The Binding of Isaac: Rebirth)
- The Dark Overlords of the Universe (Howard the Duck film & comics)
- Daruni (Devilman)
- DCI Jim Keats (Ashes to Ashes TV series)
- The Deadites (The Evil Dead films)
- Dean Winchester (Supernatural)
- Deathcatcher (Ultrakill)
- Decarbia (Lineage II)
- Deformed Flesh Demons (Jacob's Ladder)
- Delrith (RuneScape online role-playing game)
- Demi-fiend (Shin Megami Tensei III: Nocturne)
- Demise (The Legend of Zelda: Skyward Sword)
- Demogorgon (Prince of Demons) (Dungeons & Dragons)
- The Demon (Mirrors)
- The Demon (Rock & Rule movie)
- The Demonata (The Demonata)
- Demon Behemoth (Timm Thaler)
- Demon Hipster Chicks (Scott Pilgrim vs. the World film)
- Demoninja (Kingdom of Loathing)
- Demonita (Darna)
- The Demon Kingdom (Brave Animated Series)
- The Demon Shredder (Teenage Mutant Ninja Turtles)
- The Demons (Anastasia)
- Destoroyah (Godzilla vs Destoroyah)
- Devi Devi (Panyo Panyo Di Gi Charat)
- Diablo (Diablo series and Heroes of the Storm)
- Diabolico (Power Rangers Lightspeed Rescue)
- Diavolo (Obey Me)
- Dipper (Supernatural TV series)
- Dirty Rat (Lapitch the Little Shoemaker)
- The Djinn (Wishmaster)
- Dodge (Locke & Key)
- Doma (Demon Slayer: Kimetsu no Yaiba)
- Doom (Dota 2)
- Dorango (Devilman)
- Dormammu (Marvel's Doctor Strange, Comics and MCU Movies)
- Doviculus (Brütal Legend)
- Doyle (Angel)
- Draghinazzo (Dante's Inferno)
- Drago (Jackie Chan Adventures TV series)
- Drawcia (Kirby: Power Paintbrush)
- Dread Knight (Doom video game series)
- Dread Overlord Splaarghön (The Bad Guys)
- Dretch (Dungeons & Dragons fantasy game)
- Drexel (Supernatural TV series)
- Druaga (The Tower of Druaga)
- The Dubyukk (Strange)
- Duke (Supernatural TV series)
- Dumain (Charmed TV series)
- The Dunamez (G.P. Taylor, Shadowmancer)
- Duriel (Diablo series)
- Durin's Bane (J. R. R. Tolkien's The Lord of the Rings)

== E ==
- Ebain (Devilman)
- Eddie (Guilty Gear)
- Edgar Reese (Fallen)
- Enmu (Demon Slayer: Kimetsu no Yaiba)
- Eraser (Maximum Ride series)
- Etna (Disgaea)
- Etrigan (DC Comics)
- Evil (Time Bandits)
- Estarrosa (Nanatsu No Taizai)
- Elder Toguro (Yu Yu Hakusho)
- Evelynn (League of Legends)

== F ==
- The Fallen (The Binding of Isaac and The Binding of Isaac: Rebirth)
- The Fallen (Devil May Cry 3)
- Faquarl (Jonathan Stroud, Bartimaeus Trilogy)
- Farfarello (Dante's Inferno)
- Fecor (Shakugan no Shana)
- Femur (Darren Shan, The Demonata)
- Fiddlesticks (League of Legends)
- Firebrand (Ghosts 'n Goblins video game series; Gargoyle's Quest, Gargoyle's Quest II, and Demon's Crest video games)
- Fizzarolli (Helluva Boss)
- Foot Mystics (Teenage Mutant Ninja Turtles)
- Forbesii (Shuffle!)
- Freddy Krueger (A Nightmare on Elm Street)
- Frederick Gideon (Locke & Key)
- The Friends on the Other Side (The Princess and the Frog)
- Frosts (Devil May Cry)
- Furfur (Umineko When They Cry)
- Fyrus, Twilit Igniter (The Legend of Zelda: Twilight Princess)

== G ==
- Gaap (Umineko When They Cry)
- Gaap (Welcome to Demon School! Iruma-kun)
- Gahrumble (WarioWare Gold)
- Galland (Seven Deadly Sins)
- Ganon (The Legend of Zelda video game series)
- Gargoyle (Doom video game series)
- Gary (Andy Hamilton, Old Harry's Game BBC radio comedy)
- Gayle (The Good Place)
- Geeraard de Duivel (Geeraard the Devil) (The Adventures of Nero)
- Gelmar (¿¿Devilman¿¿)
- Geryon, Watcher of the Skies (Ultrakill)
- Gerald (Supernatural TV series)
- Ghirahim (The Legend of Zelda: Skyward Sword)
- Ghoulies (Ghoulies film series)
- Girlfriend (Friday Night Funkin')
- The Glashan (G.P. Taylor, Shadowmancer)
- The Gloamglozer (The Edge Chronicles)
- Gnassag (Bloodline: Heroes of Lithas)
- Gnoolies (Charlie and the Great Glass Elevator)
- The God Hand (Berserk)
- Golgothan #### Demon (Dogma)
- Gothmog (J. R. R. Tolkien's The Silmarillion)
- Gozer (Ghostbusters)
- Grab (Supernatural TV series)
- The Grand High Witch, (Roald Dahl's The Witches)
- Gregor (Darren Shan, The Demonata)
- The Griever (Darksiders)
- Griffith (Berserk)
- Griffon (Devil May Cry)
- Griselbrand (Magic: the Gathering)
- Guthrie (Supernatural TV series)
- Guy (Supernatural TV series)
- Gwi-Ma (KPop Demon Hunters)
- Gwydion "Rune" Felton-Hunter (Scarlet Cherie: Vampire Series)
- Gyokko (Demon Slayer: Kimetsu no Yaiba)
- Gyutaro (Demon Slayer: Kimetsu no Yaiba)

== H ==
- Halfrek (Buffy the Vampire Slayer)
- Hannah Anafeloz (Kuroshitsuji)
- Hantengu (Demon Slayer: Kimetsu no Yaiba)
- Har'lakk the Riftsplitter (RuneScape online role-playing game)
- Harrington (Supernatural TV series)
- Hastur (Cthulhu Mythos multiple-author fiction)
- Hastur (Neil Gaiman and Terry Pratchett, Good Omens)
- Hatred (Block Tales, Roblox subgame)
- Hecaitomix (Blair Witch video game series)
- Hel Harington (¿¿Fox Spirit¿¿)
- Hell Knight (Doom video game series)
- Hellboy (Hellboy comic book series)
- Hellspawns (Spawn comic book series)
- Henrietta Knowby (Evil Dead II)
- Hessian Horseman (Sleepy Hollow movie)
- Hexxus (Ferngully: The Last Rainforest)
- Hezrou (Dungeons & Dragons fantasy game)
- Hideous Mass (Ultrakill)
- Hiei (Yu Yu Hakusho)
- HIM (The Powerpuff Girls)
- Hnikarr (Sarah Rees Brennan, The Demon's Lexicon)
- Homura Akemi (Puella Magi Madoka Magica)
- Hooty (The Owl House)
- Horace Pinker (Shocker)
- Hot Stuff the Little Devil (Harvey Comics)
- Hsi Wu (Jackie Chan Adventures TV series)
- Hugh Crain (The Haunting)
- Hunson Abadeer (Adventure Time)
- Husk (Hazbin Hotel)

== I ==
- Iblis (Blue Exorcist)
- Icon of Sin (Doom)
- Idol (Ultrakill)
- Ifrit (Final Fantasy series)
- Illidan (Warcraft and Heroes of the Storm)
- Illuge (Devilman)
- Imp (Doom video game series)
- The Imprisoned/Demise (The Legend of Zelda: Skyward Sword)
- Infernal (City of Heroes)
- Invictus (Final Space)
- InuYasha (InuYasha)
- Izual (Diablo series)

== J ==
- Jabberwocky (Shakespeare Sister's Grimm books)
- Jabor (Jonathan Stroud, Bartimaeus Trilogy)
- Jack Ferriman (Ghost Ship movie)
- Jael (Supernatural TV series)
- Jakabok Botch (Clive Barker, Mister B. Gone)
- Janemba (Dragon Ball Z: Fusion Reborn)
- Jan Valek (Vampires)
- Japhrimel (Dante Valentine fantasy)
- Jaraxxus (World of Warcraft)
- Jason Voorhees (Friday the 13th)
- Jedah Dohma (Darkstalkers)
- Jennifer Check (Jennifer's Body horror film)
- Jeong Gu-won (My Demon)
- Jervis (Supernatural TV series)
- Jezebel Mephistopheles (Saints Row Gat Out of Hell)
- Jinmen (Devilman)
- Jinu (KPop Demon Hunters)
- Joey Atkins (Strange)
- Josefel Zatanos (Coffin Joe trilogy)
- Judge Holden (Blood Meridian)
- Judgment (Helltaker)
- Juiblex (Dungeons & Dragons role-playing game)
- Jun Fudo (Devil Lady)
- Jungler (Deliver Us From Evil crime-horror film)
- Justice (Helltaker)

== K ==
- K'ril Tsutsaroth (RuneScape online role-playing game)
- Kaa Jinn (Strange)
- Kagura (Demon Love Spell)
- Kaigaku (Demon Slayer: Kimetsu no Yaiba)
- Kal'Ger the Warmonger (RuneScape online role-playing game)
- Kashies Lee (Teenage Mutant Ninja Turtles)
- Katie Killjoy (Hazbin Hotel)
- Kayako Saeki (Ju-On film series)
- Ke'Oth (Adventure Time)
- Khorne (Warhammer Fantasy and Warhammer 40,000)
- Kildor (Beast Quest)
- Kil'jaeden the Deceiver (Warcraft series)
- Killabilly (Lollipop Chainsaw)
- Killer BOB (Twin Peaks)
- King Clawthorne (The Owl House)
- Kip (Supernatural TV series)
- Kneesocks (Panty & Stocking with Garterbelt)
- Koakuma (Touhou Project)
- Kokushibo (Demon Slayer: Kimetsu no Yaiba)
- Koroviev (Mikhail Bulgakov, The Master and Margarita)
- Korrok (David Wong, John Dies at the End novel)
- Kragos (Beast Quest)
- Krampus (The Binding of Isaac and The Binding of Isaac: Rebirth)
- Kronos (In Nomine role-playing game)
- Kurama (Yu Yu Hakusho)
- Kurama (Nine Tails Fox)(Naruto)

== L ==
- Lacock (Devilman)
- Lafleur (Devilman)
- Laharl (Disgaea)
- Lala (Devilman)
- Lamia (Drag Me to Hell)
- The Landscaper (Kingdom of Loathing)
- Laplace's Demon
- Lasciel (Dresden Files)
- Leviathan (Obey Me)
- Leviathan (Umineko When They Cry)
- Leviathan (Ultrakill)
- Libicocco (Dante's Inferno)
- Libra (Elden Ring: Nightreign)
- Ligur (Neil Gaiman and Terry Pratchett, Good Omens)
- Lilith (multiple works)
- Lipstick-Face Demon (Insidious)
- Little Horn (The Binding of Isaac: Afterbirth)
- Little Nicky (Little Nicky)
- Loc-Nar (Heavy Metal)
- Loki (The Binding of Isaac and The Binding of Isaac: Rebirth)
- Lokii (The Binding of Isaac: Wrath of the Lamb and The Binding of Isaac: Rebirth)
- Lothario (Scarlet Cherie: Vampire Series)
- Lola (Supernatural TV series)
- Loona (Helluva Boss)
- Longhorn Golkonda (Lineage II)
- Lord of Darkness (Legend)
- Lord English (Homestuck)
- Lord Loss (Darren Shan, The Demonata)
- Lord Tirek (Rescue at Midnight Castle), (My Little Pony: Friendship is Magic)
- Lorne (Angel)
- Lucemon (Digimon)
- Luci (Disenchantment)
- Lucifer (multiple works)
- Lucifer (Obey Me)
- Lucifer Morningstar (DC Comics)
- Lucius Heinous VII (Jimmy Two-Shoes)

== M ==
- Demon King Maarg (The Riftwar Cycle series)
- Madama Butterfly (Bayonetta)
- Madama Khepri (Bayonetta)
- Madama Styx (Bayonetta)
- Maderas (Disgaea)
- Mail daemon (NetHack)
- Majin Buu (Dragon Ball anime series)
- Majora (The Legend of Zelda: Majora's Mask)
- Makima (Chainsaw Man)
- Mal'Ganis (Warcraft series and Heroes of the Storm)
- Malacoda (Dante's Inferno)
- Malebolgia (Spawn)
- Maledict (Doom 3: Resurrection of Evil)
- Malfegor (Magic: The Gathering)
- Malice (The Demonata)
- Malice (Fortnite: Battle Royale)
- Malicious Face (Ultrakill)
- Malina (Helltaker)
- Malhyne (Fading of the Cries)
- Malladus (The Legend of Zelda: Spirit Tracks)
- Mama (Mama movie)
- Mammon (multiple works)
- Mammon (Helluva Boss)
- Mammon (Spawn)
- Mammon (Obey Me)
- The Manager (Stephen King's The Shining)
- Mancubus (Doom video game series)
- Mannoroth the Destructor (Warcraft series)
- Mannequin (Ultrakill)
- Marauder (Doom Eternal video game)
- Marbas (The Priests)
- Marceline Abadeer (Adventure Time)
- Mard Geer (Fairy Tail)
- Marilith (Dungeons & Dragons fantasy game)
- Mary Shaw (Dead Silence)
- Masselin (Charmed TV series)
- Mathias (Fading of the Cries)
- Mazikeen (The Sandman and Lucifer as comic-book and TV-series)
- Meg Masters (Supernatural TV series)
- Mega Satan (The Binding of Isaac: Rebirth)
- Mehrunes Dagon (The Elder Scrolls series)
- Meliodas (Seven Deadly Sins)
- Melkor, a.k.a. Morgoth (J. R. R. Tolkien's The Silmarillion)
- The Men with Sticks and Ropes (Being Human)
- Mephiles the Dark (Sonic the Hedgehog series)
- Mephisto (Diablo and Heroes of the Storm)
- Mephisto Pheles (Blue Exorcist)
- Mephisto (Marvel)
- Mephisto or Mephistopheles (multiple works)
- Mephistroth (Warcraft series)
- Mercutio (AdventureQuest Worlds online role-playing game)
- Mermaim (Devilman)
- Michael (The Good Place)
- MIKE (Twin Peaks)
- Milan Incubi (Strange)
- Millie (Helluva Boss)
- Minion (Twisted Metal)
- Minos (Beast Quest)
- Minotaur (Ultrakill)
- Morrigan Aensland (Darkstalkers)
- Modeus (Helltaker)
- Molag Bal (The Elder Scrolls series)
- Mommy Mearest (Friday Night Funkin')
- Mother (Scarlet Cherie: Vampire Series)
- Mourn (Kingdom of Loathing)
- Moxxie (Helluva Boss)
- Mundus, Demon King (Devil May Cry)
- Muzan Kibutsuji (Demon Slayer: Kimetsu no Yaiba)
- Mystery Saja (KPop Demon Hunters)

== N ==
- N'zall (Eoin Colfer, Artemis Fowl novel series)
- N°1 (Eoin Colfer, Artemis Fowl novel series)
- Nadia Moore (The Demonata)
- Nalfeshnee (Dungeons & Dragons fantasy game)
- The Nameless Demon (Strange)
- Nanatoo (The Mighty Boosh)
- Narvarog (Fablehaven)
- Natsu (Fairy Tail)
- Nausizz (Crossed Swords video game)
- Nebiroth (Super Ghouls'n Ghosts)
- Necrodeus (Kirby Mass Attack)
- Nelo Angelo (Devil May Cry)
- Nerine (Shuffle!)
- Nero (Devil May Cry 4)
- Neuro Nōgami (Majin Tantei Nōgami Neuro)
- Nevermore (Dota 2, as Shadow Fiend)
- Newt (Kim Harrison, Hollows print series)
- Ne Zha (Ne Zha, Ne Zha 2)
- Nezuko Kamado (Demon Slayer: Kimetsu no Yaiba)
- Niffty (Hazbin Hotel)
- Nightmare (Kirby's Adventure)
- Nightmare (Devil May Cry)
- The Nightmare (The Legend of Zelda: Link's Awakening)
- Noi Tai Dar (Teenage Mutant Ninja Turtles Adventures series)
- Nouda (Jonathan Stroud, Bartimaeus Trilogy)
- Null (Teenage Mutant Ninja Turtles Adventures)
- Nurgle (Warhammer Fantasy and Warhammer 40,000)
- Nyarlathotep (Cthulhu Mythos)

== O ==
- Octavia (Helluva Boss)
- Odio (Live A Live)
- Omega Spawn (Spawn)
- Oyashiro (07th Expansion, Higurashi When They Cry visual novel series)
- Ozhin (Countdown)
- Ob Nixilis (Magic: the Gathering)

== P ==
- Paimon (multiple works)
- Paimon (Hereditary)
- Pandemonica (Helltaker)
- Pazuzu (The Exorcist)
- Peaches (Rocko's Modern Life)
- Sir Pentious (Hazbin Hotel)
- Phantasmaraneae (Bayonetta)
- Phantom (Devil May Cry)
- Phlebiac Brothers (Spawn)
- Pinhead (Hellraiser)
- Pinky (Doom video game series)
- Po Kong (Jackie Chan Adventures TV series)
- Psaro (Dragon Quest IV: Chapters of the Chosen)
- Psycho Jenny (Devilman)
- Pumpkinhead (Pumpkinhead)
- Pursuers (Chrono Crusade)
- Pyramid Head (Silent Hill)
- Pain Elemental (Doom video game series)

== Q ==
- Quan chi (Mortal Kombat)
- Quasami, Warrior Devil (Strange)
- Quasit (Dungeons & Dragons fantasy game)
- Queen Akasha (Queen of the Damned)
- Queen Bansheera (¿¿Power Rangers Lightspeed Rescue¿¿)
- Queezle (Jonathan Stroud, Bartimaeus Trilogy)
- Tobias Quintenpreut - (the mascot of the underground comix magazine Tante Leny Presenteert, designed by Jan van Haasteren).
- Quitoon (Clive Barker, Mister B. Gone)
- Qwan (Eoin Colfer, Artemis Fowl novel series)
- Qweffor (Eoin Colfer, Artemis Fowl novel series)

== R ==
- Rakdos (Magic: the Gathering)
- Ramiel (Supernatural TV series)
- Ramuthra (Jonathan Stroud, Bartimaeus Trilogy)
- Randall Flagg (Stephen King, The Stand and other works)
- Raven (DC Comics)
- Raul (Supernatural TV series)
- Ravira (Beast Quest)
- Razgriz (Ace Combat 5: The Unsung War)
- Red (WarioWare: Touched!)
- Red (All Dogs Go to Heaven 2)
- Red (NES Godzilla Creepypasta)
- Red Guy (Cow and Chicken)
- Revenant (Doom video game series)
- Rias Gremory (High School DxD)
- Rin Okumura (Blue Exorcist)
- Robot Devil (Futurama)
- Rock Demons (The Edge Chronicles)
- Romance Saja (KPop Demon Hunters)
- Ronove (Umineko When They Cry)
- Rosie (Hazbin Hotel)
- Rosier (Karen Chance, The Cassandra Palmer series)
- Rubicante (Dante's Inferno)
- Ruby (Supernatural TV series)
- Rufio the Magnificent (Dungeons & Dragons fantasy game)
- Rumi (KPop Demon Hunters)

== S ==
- Samael (The Mortal Instruments series)
- Samhain (Supernatural TV series)
- Sammael the Desolate One, a.k.a. the Lord of Resurrection (Hellboy)
- Sardius (Super Ghouls'n Ghosts)
- Sargeras (Warcraft)
- Satan (multiple works)
- Satan (Helluva Boss)
- Satan (Obey Me)
- Sauron (J. R. R. Tolkien's The Lord of the Rings and The Silmarillion)
- Savanti Romero (Teenage Mutant Ninja Turtles)
- Scanty (Panty & Stocking with Garterbelt)
- The Scarlet King (SCP Foundation)
- Scarlet Van Halisha (Lineage II)
- Scarmiglione (Dante's Inferno)
- Screwtape (C. S. Lewis, The Screwtape Letters)
- Scumspawn (Andy Hamilton, Old Harry's Game BBC radio comedy)
- SCP-166 (SCP Foundation)
- Sebastian Michaelis (Kuroshitsuji)
- Seloth (G.P. Taylor, Shadowmancer)
- Sesshomaru (InuYasha)
- Seven Deadly Sins (DC Comics)
- Seylos (Amon: The Darkside of the Devilman)
- Shadows (Devil May Cry)
- Shadow Men (White Noise film)
- The Shadowchild (Digger webcomic)
- Shawn (The Good Place)
- Shax (Charmed TV series)
- Shelob (J. R. R. Tolkien's The Lord of the Rings)
- Shendu (Jackie Chan Adventures TV series)
- Shok.wav (Hazbin Hotel)
- Sierra (Supernatural TV series)
- Silene (Devilman)
- Silitha (Darksiders)
- Simmons (Supernatural TV series)
- Simon Cartwright (The Ugly)
- Sinners (Chrono Crusade)
- Slaanesh (Warhammer Fantasy and Warhammer 40,000)
- Sock (Welcome to Hell animation)
- The Source of All Evil (Charmed TV series)
- Sparda (Hideki Kamiya, Devil May Cry video game series)
- Spawn (Image Comics)
- Spider Mastermind (Doom video game series)
- Spine (The Demonata)
- Stella (Helluva Boss)
- Stolas (Helluva Boss)
- Straga (Darksiders)
- Striker (Helluva Boss)
- The Stygian (Darksiders)
- Sven Golly (Kingdom of Loathing)
- Sweetgrass-Voice (Digger webcomic)
- Sylathus (Fading of the Cries)
- Sytry (Also known as Sitri) (Devils and Realist)

== T ==
- Takeo Saeki (Ju-on film series)
- Tathamet (Diablo)
- The Tall Man (Charmed)
- The Tall Man (Phantasm)
- Tash, (C.S. Lewis' The Chronicles of Narnia)
- Tchang Zu (Jackie Chan Adventures TV series)
- Tchernobog (Blood video game)
- Teggamon (Bloodline: Heroes of Lithas)
- Te Kā (Disney, Moana movie)
- Tempus (Charmed TV series)
- Terrorblade (Dota 2 video game)
- Texsch (Devilman)
- Thammaron (RuneScape online role-playing game)
- The Great Leviathan (Yu-Gi-Oh!)
- The Lich (Adventure Time)
- The Omega (Ninjago: Masters of Spinjitzu)
- The Overlord (Ninjago: Masters of Spinjitzu)
- Thomas "Boss" Mutton (Catherine)
- Thompson (Kuroshitsuji)
- Thulsa Doom (Conan the Barbarian)
- Thura (Fading of the Cries)
- Tiamat (Darksiders)
- Timber (Kuroshitsuji)
- Titan (Doom video game series)
- The Titan (The Owl House)
- To'Kash the Bloodchiller (RuneScape online role-playing game)
- Toby (Paranormal Activity film series)
- Tom the Demon Prince (Star vs the Forces of Evil)
- Tony Reno (Sometimes They Come Back Again)
- Trevor (The Good Place)
- Trigon (DC Comics)
- Trish (Devil May Cry)
- Tritannus (Winx Club)
- Tso Lan (Jackie Chan Adventures TV series)
- Turok-Han (Buffy the Vampire Slayer TV series)
- Tzeentch (Warhammer Fantasy and Warhammer 40,000)

== U ==
- Ultraman Belial (Mega Monster Battle: Ultra Galaxy, Ultra Galaxy Legend Side Story: Ultraman Zero vs. Darklops Zero, Ultraman Zero: The Revenge of Belial, Ultraman Saga, Ultra Zero Fight, Ultraman Ginga, Ultraman Ginga S, Ultraman X, Ultra Series, Ultraman Retsuden, Ultraman Orb, Ultraman Geed, Ultraman R/B, Ultraman Taiga, Ultraman Z, Ultraman Trigger: New Generation Tiga, Ultra Galaxy Fight: The Abosulte Conspiracy, Various Ultra Series Video Games, Ultraman Retsuden & Ultra Galaxy Fight: The Destined Cossroad, Ultra Series)
- Ungoliant (J. R. R. Tolkien's Silmarillion)
- Unicron (Transformers)
- Urizen (Devil May Cry 5)

== V ==
- Vaatu (The Legend of Korra)
- Valak (The Conjuring 2)
- Valentino (Hazbin Hotel)
- Valtor (Winx Club)
- The Varrigal (G.P. Taylor Shadowmancer)
- Vassago (Helluva Boss)
- Vee (The Owl House)
- Vein (Darren Shan, The Demonata)
- Velvette (Hazbin Hotel)
- Vergil (Devil May Cry)
- Vermeil (Vermeil in Gold)
- Verosika Mayday (Helluva Boss)
- Vicky Sengupta (The Good Place)
- Viscerator (Spawn)
- Violator (Spawn)
- Viy (Nikolai Gogol's Viy)
- Void Termina (Kirby Star Allies)
- Vordred (AdventureQuest Worlds)
- Vox (Hazbin Hotel)
- Vrinz Clortho the Keymaster (Ghostbusters)
- Vrock (Dungeons & Dragons fantasy game)
- Vulgrim (Darksiders)
- Vulpuz (Redwall)
- Vyers (Disgaea)

== W ==
- Warlock (Julian Sands, Warlock)
- Welvath (Devilman)
- The Wendigo, (Stephen King's Pet Sematary)
- William "Maxwell" Carter (Don't Starve)
- Withengar (Magic: the Gathering)
- Professor Woland (Mikhail Bulgakov, The Master and Margarita)
- Wormwood (C.S. Lewis, The Screwtape Letters)
- Wu Tang, (Erotic Ghost Story)
- WxrtHltl-jwlpklz, (Terry Pratchett, Wyrd Sisters)

== X ==
- X(an/th) (Xanth book series)
- Xiao Fung (Jackie Chan Adventures TV series)

== Y ==
- Yaksha (The Last Vampire)
- Yk'Lagor the Thunderous (RuneScape online role-playing game)
- Yapool (Ultraman Ace, Ultraman Mebius, Ultra Fight Victory, Ultraman Retsuden, Ultra Series)
- Yoko Kurama (Yu Yu Hakusho)
- Yoru (Chainsaw Man)
- Yuuki Terumi (BlazBlue)
- Younger Toguro (Yu Yu Hakusho)

== Z ==
- Zagred (Black Clover)
- Zaldover (Devilman)
- Zamiel, the Demon Huntsman (The Ride of the Demon Huntsman, Philip Pullman)
- Zamiel Moloch (Slam Dunk Ernest)
- Zankou (Charmed TV series)
- Zann (Devilman)
- Zanshin (Throne of Darkness)
- Zariel (Baldur's Gate 3)
- Zdrada (Helltaker)
- Zdim (The Fallible Fiend)
- Zeezi (Hazbin Hotel)
- Zelloripus (Weird Dreams)
- Zennon (Demon lord Dante)
- Zennon (Devilman)
- Zepar (Umineko When They Cry)
- Overlord Zetta (Makai Kingdom: Chronicles of the Sacred Tome)
- Zestial (Hazbin Hotel)
- Zoldoba (Devilman)
- Zorc Necrophades the Dark One (Yu-Gi-Oh!)
- Zoxim (Strange)
- ZoZo (Ouija Board)
- Zuboo (Devilman)
- Zuul (Ghostbusters movie)
- Zeldris (Nanatsu No Taizai)

== See also ==
- Christian demonology
- Classification of demons
- Daimon
- Demon
- Demonology
- Devil
- Devil in the arts and popular culture
- Exorcism
- Fallen angel
- Hell
- List of angels in fiction
- List of theological demons
- Satanism
