= Barbariccia =

Demon in Dante's Inferno

Barbariccia is one of the demons in the Inferno of Dante Alighieri's Divine Comedy. Barbariccia is one of the Malebranche, whose mission is to guard Bolgia Five in the Eighth Circle, the Malebolge. Barbariccia's name means "curly beard" in Italian (from barba=beard, and riccia=curly). Barbariccia seems to be the most important devil after Malacoda as he becomes the "provost" of nine other devils, when Malacoda commands them to escort Dante and Virgil, which can be read out of the following text (the speaker is Malacoda):

"I send in that direction some of mine
To see if any one doth air himself;
Go ye with them; for they will not be vicious.

Step forward, Alichino and Calcabrina,"
Began he to cry out, "and thou, Cagnazzo;
And Barbariccia, do thou guide the ten.

Come forward, Libicocco and Draghignazzo,
And tusked Ciriatto and Graffiacane,
And Farfarello and mad Rubicante;

Search ye all round about the boiling pitch;
Let these be safe as far as the next crag,
That all unbroken passes o'er the dens." (Inferno, Canto XXI, Line 115-126)

Barbariccia seems also to have a specificity among the other nine devils, according to:

Thus sometimes, to alleviate his pain,
One of the sinners would display his back,
And in less time conceal it than it lightens.

As on the brink of water in a ditch
The frogs stand only with their muzzles out,
So that they hide their feet and other bulk,

So upon every side the sinners stood;
But ever as Barbariccia near them came,
Thus underneath the boiling they withdrew. (Inferno, Canto XXII, Line 22-30)

He is also the most serious and dutiful of the devils, since he allows Dante and Virgil to speak to the sinner (Bonturo Dati) that Graffiacane caught, and order the devils to save Alichino and Calcabrina when they fall into the lake of boiling pitch:

And Ciriatto, from whose mouth projected,
On either side, a tusk, as in a boar,
Caused him to feel how one of them could rip.

Among malicious cats the mouse (the sinner) had come;
But Barbariccia clasped him in his arms,
And said: "Stand ye aside, while I enfork him."

And to my Master he turned round his head;
Ask him again," he said, "if more thou wish
To know from him, before some one destroy him." (Inferno, Canto XXII, Line 55-63)

But sooth the other was a doughty sparhawk
To clapperclaw him well; and both of them
Fell in the middle of the boiling pond.

A sudden intercessor was the heat;
But ne'ertheless of rising there was naught,
To such degree they had their wings belimed.

Lamenting with the others, Barbariccia
Made four of them fly to the other side
With all their gaffs, and very speedily

This side and that they to their posts descended;
They stretched their hooks towards the pitch-ensnared,
Who were already baked within the crust,

And in this manner busied did we leave them. (Inferno, Canto XXII, Line 139-151)
