= Azazel in popular culture =

Azazel, a demon from Jewish mythology, has been developed into characters in popular culture.

== Literature ==
- Robertson Davies introduces Azazel and Samahazai as rebel angels in the first book of his Cornish Trilogy, The Rebel Angels. They are said to have "betrayed the secrets of Heaven to King Solomon", so that "God threw them out of Heaven", and on earth "they taught tongues, and healing and laws and hygiene".
- Azazel is the principal character in a series of short stories written by Isaac Asimov.
- Azazel is a leader of the fallen angels in the light novel (and manga/anime) series High School DxD. He becomes a teacher and club advisor at their school.
- In the light novel (and manga/anime) series Blue Exorcist, Azazel is one of the eight Demon Kings and a son of Satan.
- Azazello is a character in Mikhail Bulgakov's novel The Master and Margarita.
- In the fifth book of The Mortal Instruments, Azazel is a greater demon raised by warlock Magnus Bane to help in a search for shadowhunter Jace Lightwood.
- Neil Gaiman's Sandman comics, published by DC Comics, feature Azazel as a character.
- The X-Men comic books feature a mutant based on the legendary demon, created by writer Chuck Austen.
- In José Saramago's book "Cain" Azazel is a God's cherub who lets Eve into the Garden of Eden after she and Adam had been expelled from it. Enchanted by Eve's naked body, he makes a secret deal with her and gets her fruits from the garden, as she and her husband were wandering hungry and with no means of survival after the expulsion.
- In poem Moses by Ivan Franko, Azazel is a demon of the desert and is the main antagonist.
- In the manga Record of Ragnarok, he acts as a supporting character to Beelzebub as one of his first friends before being killed by Satan.

== Film ==
- In the film Fallen, Azazel is a demonic entity, cast from Heaven without form, who can possess others and pass between hosts via touch.
- In the Turkish horror film Şeytan-ı Racim, he helps to get rid of jinn-persecution, but impersonate to the people as a human called Mehmet Efendi.
- In the film The House with a Clock in Its Walls, Azazel is a demon who offers corrupt powers to the antagonist Isaac Izard.
- In the film Semum, Azazil is mentioned by a demon to be his new lord after he has abandoned God.

== Games ==
- In The Binding of Isaac: Rebirth, Azazel is a playable character. He begins the game with the ability to fire a small red laser called brimstone and has the appearance of a demon, with black skin and wings.
- In the 2011 action video game El Shaddai: Ascension of the Metatron, Azazel is one of the strongest Grigori who controls the human evolutions also the angelic and mortal technologies. Azazel is the right-man of the fallen angel Semyaza. In the near-end game, Azazel transforms into a Locust-like monster.
- Azazel is a demon in many of the Shin Megami Tensei series of video games, whose lore describes it as a Grigori in Judaism.
- In Star Ocean: Till the End of Time, Azazel is the Sphere Corporation's Chief of Security and helps release the Executioneers by orders from Luther Lansfield. His name was changed to Azazer in the English version.
- Azazel is the name of the final boss in Namco's Tekken 6. He is a demonic, crystalline, dragon-like creature resembling the Egyptian god Set, and he is fought inside an ancient temple in Egypt. He is revealed to be the creator of the entity known as "Devil" and by extension the Devil Gene that exists in the Hachijō and Mishima families, including Kazumi Mishima, Kazuya Mishima, and Jin Kazama.
- Azazel is the name given to the Shadow of Ichiryusai Madarame, the second boss of Persona 5.
- Azazel appears in the Warhammer Fantasy world as a champion of the chaos god Slaanesh.
- In Kingdom of Loathing, Azazel, the Archduke of Hey Deze, sends the player on a quest to return his misplaced talismans of evil power. He is described as a "rip in reality that's full of red, glowing eyes and razor-sharp teeth".
- In Helltaker, Azazel appears as one of the characters the protagonist can add to his harem, the only member who is an angel rather than a demon. She reappears in the game's bonus chapter, Examtaker, as the main antagonist, having since transformed into a demon due to the harem's sinful influence.
- Azazel appears in Dragalia Lost as a summonable dragon whose existence was scrubbed from history by the Ilian Church.
- Azazel appears in Devour, serving as the overarching antagonist. Players are tasked with destroying 10 items to free their friends from the grasp of the demon and casting the demon out, though throughout the game only a number of cult members have been affected by him.

== Television ==
- In the CW TV series Supernatural, Azazel is the main antagonist in the first and second seasons, whom the main characters begin hunting to seek revenge for the death of their mother. However, Azazel is not referred to by name until the third season; prior to this, he is called "the Yellow-Eyed Demon", "the Man With Yellow Eyes", or simply "Yellow Eyes".
- In the anime Rage of Bahamut: Genesis, Azazel is an antagonistic fallen angel and the subordinate of Lucifer, both of whom side with the demons against the gods.
- In the mini-series Fallen, Azazel appears in the second part. He is released after 5000 years of imprisonment and starts his search for Aaron.
- The British TV series Hex featured fallen angel Azazeal (Michael Fassbender) as one of its primary antagonists.
- The Mortal Instruments TV adaptation Shadowhunters depicted Azazel in season 2, portrayed by Brett Donahue.
- The anime High School DxD features a fallen angel named Azazel.
- In the Analog Horror series Midwest Angelica, the Cultists refer to the main antagonist, AZ-001, as Azazel.
