= Devour =

Devour or Devoured may refer to:

== Film ==
- Devour (film), a 2005 American horror film directed by David Winkler
- Devoured (film), a 2012 American horror film directed by Greg Olliver
- Devour! The Food Film Fest, a Canadian film festival

== Music ==
- Devour (Dave Hause album), 2013
- Devour (Pharmakon album), 2019
- "Devour" (song), by Shinedown, 2008
- "Devour", a song by Disturbed from Believe, 2002
- "Devour", a song by Firewind from Firewind, 2020
- "Devour", a song by Harm's Way from Common Suffering, 2023
- "Devour", a song by Marilyn Manson from The High End of Low, 2009

== Other uses ==
- Devour (video game), a 2021 co-op PvE horror game
- Motorola Devour, an Android-based smartphone
- Devour, a food brand produced by Heinz
- Devoured, a 2018 novel by Anna Mackmin

== See also ==
- Devours, Jeff Cancade, Canadian electronic musician
