= Ciriatto =

Demon in Dante's Inferno

Ciriatto is one of the Malebranche in Dante's Inferno, appearing in Cantos XXI, XXII and XXIII.

In Italian, Ciriatto's name means "swine" or "little pig" (-atto is a diminutive suffix for animals). This is reinforced when Ciriatto is referred to as "tusky" (Italian: sannuto; Canto XXI Verse 122).

Ciriatto is the main focus of a single triplet, where he pounces on Ciampolo, a grafter who is caught in their circle. He is quickly stopped by Barbariccia, who takes his own turn torturing the sinner. This continues the pattern of Dante introducing the ten demons in Canto XXI then mentioning them all exactly once in Canto XXII.

E Cirïatto, a cui di bocca uscia
d’ogne parte una sanna come a porco,
li fé sentir come l’una sdruscia.

—Dante Alighieri

And Ciriatto, from whose mouth there bulged
to right and left two tusks like a wild hog’s,
then let him feel how one of them could mangle.

—Allen Mandelbaum
