= Cagnazzo =

Demon in Dante's Inferno

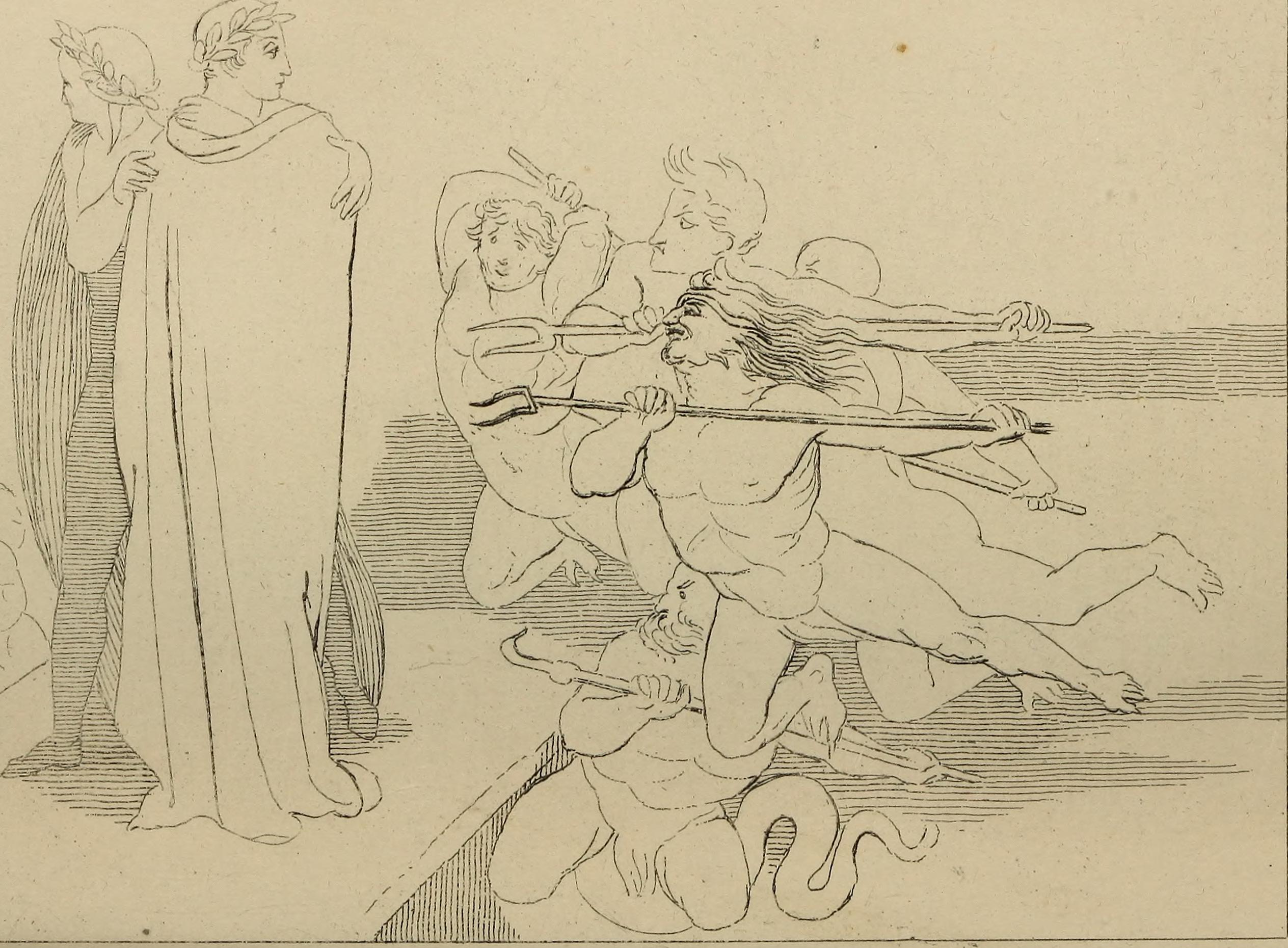
The Malebranche try to attack Dante and Virgil before Virgil explains that their mission is divinely willed.

Cagnazzo is one of the Malebranche in Dante's Inferno, appearing in Cantos XXI, XXII and XXIII.

In Italian, his name means "nasty dog." This meaning is later reinforced when Dante describes his "muzzle" (Italian: muso; Canto XXII Verse 106).

He is called by Malacoda, the leader of the Malebranche, to be part of the unrequested escort that is assigned to help Dante and Virgil find a bridge to cross after discovering that the most direct one has collapsed. The poets will discover later on that the bridge they are searching for does not exist.

When the shade fished out of the pitch, Ciampolo, asks to be allowed back into the pitch in exchange for a special signal that will call up other shades, Cagnazzo is the most skeptical because he imagines Ciampolo will mock them by escaping into the pitch.

However, after Alichino assures that if the shade does escape then his wings would be fast enough to catch up with him, Cagnazzo is the first to move away from the shore and hide as asked by the damned. This is a subtle psychological detail, that is, the one who was the most opposed becomes the first to carry out an order, and can be interpreted as evidence of Cagnazzo's conviction, which changed opposition to zeal. But it can also be an allusion to Cagnazzo's disillusionment, as if he implied that the sooner the antics end, the better off everyone would be.
