= Loremaster =

Loremaster may refer to:

- Loremaster (Dungeons & Dragons), a prestige character class in the Dungeons & Dragons 3rd edition role-playing game
- Loremaster, the antagonist in the Examtaker chapter of the video game Helltaker
- Lore-master, a character class in The Lord of the Rings Roleplaying Game
- Loremaster, a series of campaign modules for the Rolemaster role-playing game
- The Loremaster, a level boss in the video game Strife
