= George Tsisetski =

Byelorussian filmmaker

- Born: Ryhor Cisiecki; November 24, 1985 (age 39); Minsk, Belarus
- Occupation: Film director
- Years active: 2004–present
- Notable work: Evgenia, Dym
- Style: Nonlinear, Surrealistic, Horror

George Tsisetski (also Grzegorz Cisiecki) (born 24 November 1985 in Minsk) is a Byelorussian film director, screenwriter, dramatist and visual artist, who is known for his surrealist films.

== Filmography ==
=== Directed ===
- EVGENIA on YouTube (Short film) (2005)
- Niewolnica (Short film) (2006)
- Veha (2006)
- Jadlo (Short film) (2007)
- Dym (Short film) (2007)
- Scena (2007)
- Mister B. Gone (pre-production) (2013)

=== Written ===
- Dym (Short film) (2007)
- Mister B. Gone (pre-production) (2013)

== Prizes and awards ==
- 2006 - Special Mention (Short Film Palme d'Or)
- 2007 - Special Jury Prize (Fantasporto Short Film Program)
