= Wormwood =

Wormwood may refer to:

== Biology ==
- Several plants of the genus Artemisia:
  - Artemisia abrotanum, southern wormwood
  - Artemisia absinthium, common wormwood, grande wormwood or absinthe wormwood
  - Artemisia annua, sweet wormwood or annual wormwood
  - Artemisia herba-alba, white wormwood, the wormwood of the Bible
  - Artemisia pontica, Roman wormwood
  - Artemisia princeps, Korean wormwood
  - Artemisia verlotiorum
  - Artemisia vulgaris, Mugwort
- A caterpillar that eats some of the above:
  - Cucullia absinthii, a caterpillar/moth in the family Noctuidae

== Places ==
- Wormwood Scrubs, an open space in the Hammersmith area of West London
  - HM Prison Wormwood Scrubs, a prison in West London
- Wormwood Street, in the City of London
- Wormwood Forest, former name of the Red Forest in Ukraine, surrounding the Chernobyl Nuclear Power Plant within the Exclusion Zone

== Arts and entertainment ==
=== Fictional characters ===
- Wormwood, a character in C. S. Lewis's The Screwtape Letters
- Matilda Wormwood, the title character of the children's novel Matilda by Roald Dahl
  - Harry Wormwood, Zinnia Wormwood, Michael Wormwood, other characters in Matilda
- Mrs. Wormwood, several characters
- Wormwood, a playable character in Don't Starve: Hamlet and Don't Starve Together

=== Film and television ===
- Wormwood (miniseries), a 2017 docudrama directed by Errol Morris

== Literature ==
- Wormwood (Bible), a "star" that falls to earth in the end times, makes water bitter, and kills many people
- Wormwood (short story collection), a book of short horror stories by Poppy Z. Brite
- Wormwood (Taylor novel), a 2004 fantasy novel by Graham Taylor
- Wormwood, a collection of science fiction stories by Terry Dowling
- Wormwood: A Drama of Paris, an 1890 novel by Marie Corelli

=== Periodicals ===
- Wormwood (magazine), a magazine of literature and literary criticism
- Wormwood: Gentleman Corpse, a comic book series by Ben Templesmith
- Wormwood Review, a literary magazine published from 1959 to 1999
- Chronicles of Wormwood, a comic book miniseries by Garth Ennis from Avatar Press

=== Music ===
- Wormwood, a side-project band featuring two members of Doomriders
- Wormwood (Marduk album), 2009
- Wormwood (Moe album), 2003
- Wormwood (The Acacia Strain album), 2010
- Wormwood: Curious Stories from the Bible, a 1998 album by the Residents
- Wormwood Live, a 1999 live album by the Residents

== See also ==
- Wyrmwood, a 2014 horror film by Kiah Roache-Turner
