= Malebolge =

Eighth circle of hell in Dante's Inferno

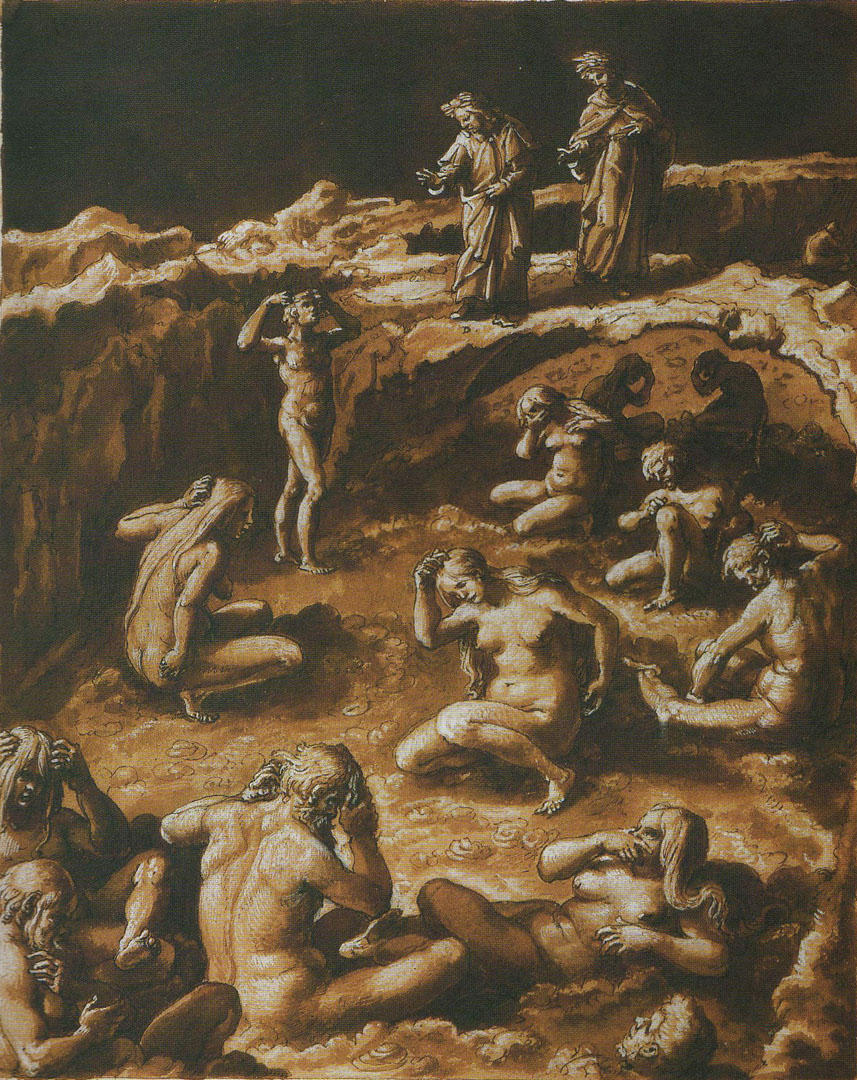
Sinners in the second bolgia, as illustrated by Stradanus.

In Dante Alighieri's Inferno, part of the Divine Comedy, Malebolge (English: /ˌmælɪˈbɒldʒ/ MAL-ib-OLJ; Italian: [ˌmaleˈbɔldʒe]; lit. 'evil ditches'), or Fraud, is the eighth circle of Hell. It is a large, funnel-shaped cavern, itself divided into ten concentric circular trenches or ditches, each called a bolgia (Italian for 'pouch' or 'ditch'). Long causeway bridges run from the outer circumference of Malebolge to its center, pictured as spokes on a wheel. At the center of Malebolge is the ninth and final circle of hell, known as Cocytus.

== Overview ==
In Dante's version of Hell, categories of sin are punished in different circles, with the depth of the circle (and placement within that circle) symbolic of the amount of punishment to be inflicted. Sinners placed in the upper circles of Hell are given relatively minor punishments, while sinners in the depths of Hell endure far greater torments. As the eighth of nine circles, Malebolge is one of the worst places in Hell to be. In it, sinners guilty of "simple" fraud are punished (that is, fraud that is committed without particularly malicious intent, whereas malicious or "compound" fraud—fraud which goes against the bonds of love, blood and honor, or the bond of hospitality—would be punished in the ninth circle). Sinners of this category include counterfeiters, hypocrites, grafters, seducers, sorcerers and simoniacs.

Dante and his guide, Virgil, make their way into Malebolge by riding on the back of the monster Geryon, the personification of fraud, who possesses the face of an honest man 'good of cheer,' but the tail of a scorpion, who flies them down through the yawning chasm that separates the eighth circle from the seventh circle, where the violent are punished. Dante and Virgil plan on crossing Malebolge by way of the system of bridges, but find their path disturbed by many broken ledges and collapsed bridges that were destroyed during the Harrowing of Hell. They must then cross some of the bolgias on foot and even rely on demons to guide them. Eventually, they make it to the inner ledge where, after a brief look at the giants, the babbling Nimrod to the hostile Ephialtes and heavily chained Briareus, Virgil convinces the giant Antaeus to lower them down to the ninth circle's frozen lake, Cocytus.

== The Malebranche ==
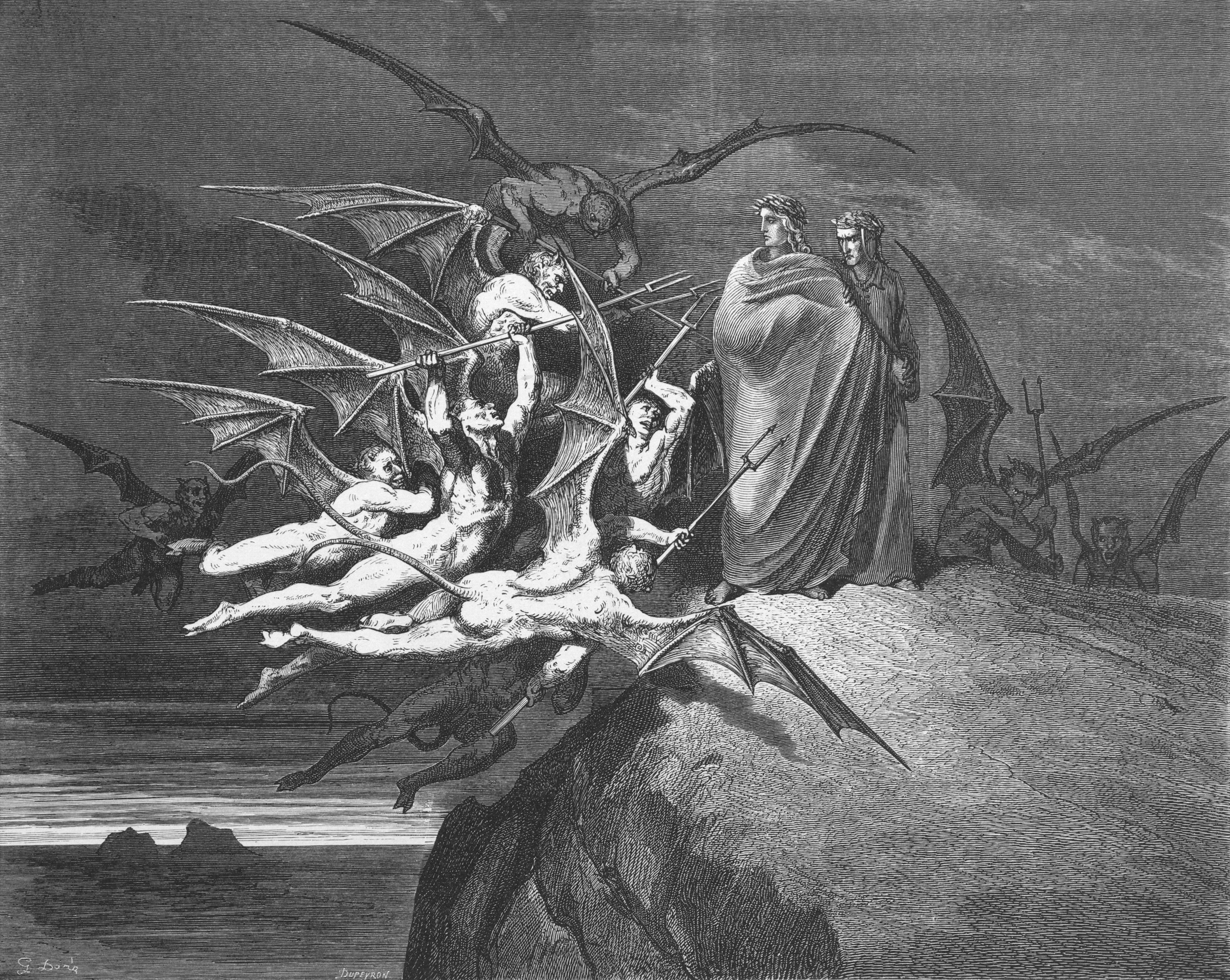
The Malebranche threaten Virgil and Dante in the fifth bolgia, portrayed by Gustave Doré.

Thirteen demons known as the Malebranche ('Evil Claws'), guard the fifth bolgia of the Malebolge. Their leader is Malacoda ('evil tail'), while the others are Scarmiglione ('ruffle-haired'), Barbariccia ('curly beard'), Alichino (derived from Arlecchino, the Harlequin), Calcabrina ('one who walks on the frost'), Cagnazzo ('bad dog'), Libicocco ('love notch'), Draghignazzo (possibly from drago 'dragon' and sghignazzo 'guffaw'), Ciriatto (possibly 'little pork'), Graffiacane ('dog scratcher'), Farfarello ('butterfly'), Rubicante (possibly 'red' or 'rabid'), and a thirteenth Malebranche who was never named in the text. They try to trick Virgil and Dante by telling them of a path which does not really exist.

== The Ten Bolgias ==
The ten ditches of the Malebolge, in descending order, are listed thus:

=== First Bolgia (Panderers and Seducers) ===
Panderers and seducers are punished here. They are forced to march, single file around the circumference of their circle, constantly lashed by horned demons.

=== Second Bolgia (Flatterers) ===
Sinners guilty of excessive flattery are punished in this bolgia, immersed forever in a river of human excrement, similar to what their flatteries were. Thaïs the hetaira is found there.

=== Third Bolgia (Simoniacs) ===
Simoniacs are punished here. They are turned upside down in large baptismal fonts cut into the rock, with their feet set ablaze by oily fires. The heat of the flames burns according to the guilt of the sinner. Popes condemned to the Third Bolgia all go into the same font, the earlier ones pushed down by the later arrivals. Pope Nicholas III is found here, and informs Dante that Pope Boniface VIII will follow.

=== Fourth Bolgia (Sorcerers) ===
Sorcerers, astrologers, seers, and others who attempted to pervert God's laws to divine the future are punished here. Their heads have been twisted around to face backwards, and thus they are forced to walk backwards around the circumference of their circle for all eternity. They also are blinded by their tears; therefore they cannot walk in straight paths. The seers Tiresias and his daughter, Manto, reside in this bolgia.

=== Fifth Bolgia (Barrators) ===
Barrators (speculators, extortionists, blackmailers and unscrupulous businessmen: sinners who used their positions in life to gain personal wealth or other advantages for themselves) are punished by being thrown into a river of boiling pitch and tar. In addition, should any of the grafters try to escape the pitch, a horde of demons known as Malebranche, armed with grappling hooks and barbs, stands guard over them, ready to tear them to pieces.

=== Sixth Bolgia (Hypocrites) ===
Hypocrites are punished in this bolgia. They are forced to wear heavy lead robes as they walk around the circumference of their circle. The robes are golden and resemble a monk's cowl but are lined with heavy lead, symbolically representing hypocrisy. Also, Caiaphas, the Pharisee who insisted on the execution of Jesus, and all of the Sanhedrin are crucified in this circle, staked to the ground so that the ranks of the lead-weighted hypocrites march across him.

=== Seventh Bolgia (Thieves) ===
This bolgia houses the souls of fraudulent thieves. In Inferno 24, the thieves are trapped in a self-perpetuating cycle of being bitten and bound by serpents, dragons and other vengeful reptiles. Thieves are bitten by snakes, turning their bodies into ash before spontaneously regenerating their bodies again for further torment. Others are bitten by snakes and are transformed into snakes that, in turn, minister the punishment onto other souls. Here, the souls turn against each other, reflecting how theft breaks the intrinsic bonds of trust and community that hold society together. In Inferno 25, the pilgrim witnesses a group of Florentine nobles violently latch onto each other, transmuting their bodies into a monstrous hybrid. These transformations reference tales from the Metamorphoses of Ovid, such as that of Salmacis and her fusion with Hermaphroditus. Just as the thieves robbed others of their property, this punishment robs the fraudulent thieves of their most inalienable properties: their bodies and identity.

In this bolgia, the pilgrim also meets Vanni Fucci, a thief who lived in Pistoia. Vanni Fucci delivers a prophecy about Dante's fate in Florence before throwing an obscene gesture towards God and is punished by the centaur Cacus.

=== Eighth Bolgia (Counselors of Fraud) ===
The eighth bolgia is dedicated to the counselors of fraud—individuals who provided fraudulent advice or used fraud to bring about the downfall of others. Here, the souls are burned in brilliant flames.

In Inferno 26, the pilgrim meets Ulysses and Diomedes, in the form of twin flames, who are placed in this bolgia for using the Trojan Horse as a trap to besiege Troy and for deceiving Achilles to war. Ulysses tells an altered version of his last voyage: instead of returning to Ithaca, Ulysses and his crew shipwrecked in front of Mount Purgatory in a quest for knowledge. Ulysses' last voyage draws many parallels to the pilgrim's journey in the Divine Comedy. Both embark on a journey for the pursuit of greater understanding. In Ulysses' case, his pursuit for knowledge was misguided, which ultimately led to his spiritual shipwreck. Unlike Ulysses, the pilgrim's journey is ordained by divine powers. Thus, the pilgrim's journey into the self will not end in disaster.

In Inferno 27, the pilgrim encounters Guido da Montefeltro, who was placed in this bolgia for providing fraudulent advice that lead in exchange for a promise of salvation from Pope Boniface VIII. He first asks the pilgrim about the current state of affairs in Florence before narrating what led to his downfall and eventual placement in Hell.

=== Ninth Bolgia (Sowers of Discord) ===
Sinners who, in life, promoted scandals, schism, and discord are punished here; particularly those who caused schism within the church or within politics. They are forced to walk around the circumference of the circle bearing horrible, disfiguring wounds inflicted on them by a great demon with a sword. The nature of the wound mirrors the sins of the particular soul; while some only have gashes, or fingers and toes cut off, others are decapitated, cut in half (as schismatics), or are completely disemboweled. Among those who are tormented here is Muhammad, prophet of Islam and his son-in-law and successor Ali, who both eviscerate their own bodies, and Bertran de Born, alleged agitator of the Revolt of 1173–74, who carries around his severed head like a lantern. The depiction of Muhammad shows how the church used to hate Islam.

=== Tenth Bolgia (Falsifiers) ===
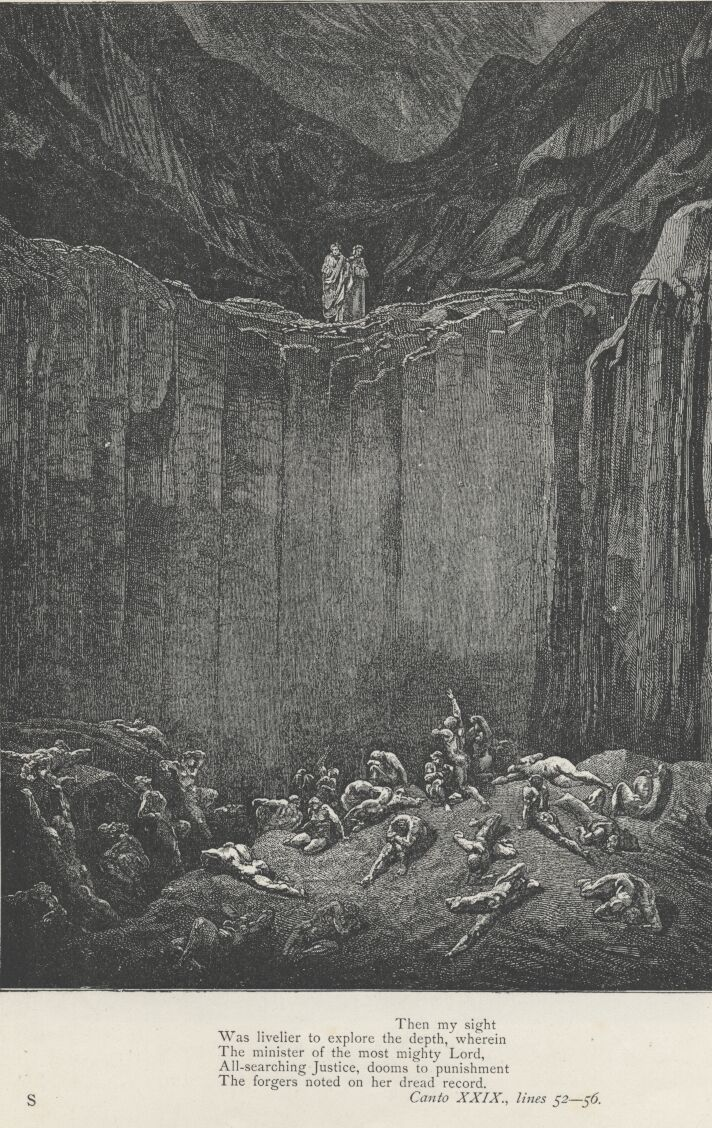
Gustave Doré- Dante and Virgil overlooking the tenth bolgia, Canto XXIX)

Falsifiers, those who attempted to alter things through lies or alchemy, or those who tried to pass off false things as real things, such as counterfeiters of coins, are punished here. This bolgia has four subdivisions where specific classes of falsifiers (alchemists, impostors, counterfeiters, and liars) endure different degrees of punishment based on horrible, consumptive diseases such as rashes, dropsy, leprosy and consumption (known today as tuberculosis). Among them is Myrrha, who suffers from insanity after she seduced her father.

The lower edge of Malebolge is guarded by a ring of titans and earth giants, many of whom are chained in place as punishment for their rebellion against God. Beyond and below the giants lies Cocytus, Hell's final depth.

== Sources ==
- Alighieri, Dante (1996). The Divine Comedy of Dante Alighieri. Oxford University Press. ISBN 978-0-19-977033-5. OCLC 728659634.
