= Awaria =

2024 video game

- Developer: Łukasz Piskorz
- Publisher: Łukasz Piskorz
- Composer: Mittsies
- Engine: Unity
- Platforms: Windows; macOS; Linux
- Release: December 16, 2024
- Genres: Bullet hell, rogue-like
- Mode: Single-player

Awaria is a 2024 bullet hell rogue-like video game by an independent Polish developer Łukasz Piskorz using the pseudonym Vanripper. It was released on Steam on December 16, 2024 for Windows, Mac and Linux. It revolves around a mechanic Ula, who fixes broken machines while avoiding attacks from ghosts.

== Gameplay ==
One of the levels of Awaria. The player controls Ula (the purple figure, bottom center), in order to evade the green ghosts and their attacks.

The player controls a mechanic, Ula, who runs through the game's small top-down levels attempting to fix broken generators by crafting and carrying details, while evading the attacks of increasingly aggressive ghosts. Depending on the difficulty level, getting hit by a ghost's attack decreases hitpoints and eventually leads to a game over. If Ula manages to evade the ghosts and fix the machines, she can talk to the ghosts and kiss them at the end of each level, and move to the next one.

== Development ==
Awaria is a stylistic follow-up to Piskorz's 2020 game Helltaker, though it is thematically and mechanically different. "Awaria" means "mechanical breakdown" or "failure" in Polish. The soundtrack was composed by Mittsies, who had also previously worked on Helltaker, while the sound design was done by Patryk Karwat.

== Reception ==
Awaria was received warmly, with reviewers noting the light "suggestive" elements of the game like poses and clothing. The game was described as "not overly complicated" and quick, creating a cosy, inviting experience, that is a "refreshing change of pace." On Steam, Awaria received over 10,000 reviews, 96% of which were positive, following its release.
