= Pharmakon (music) =

- Performing at the Fox Cabaret, Vancouver, 2015

Background information
- Born: Margaret Chardiet; June 19, 1990 (age 36); Far Rockaway, New York, U.S.
- Origin: New York City, U.S.
- Genres: Dark ambient; Industrial; noise
- Instruments: Synths; vocals
- Years active: 2009–present
- Labels: BloodLust!; Sacred Bones

Pharmakon is the solo experimental music project of Margaret Chardiet (born June 19, 1990), based out of New York City and formed in 2007. Pharmakon's live musical act has been described as confrontational and concise, attempting to "cross the boundary between performer and audience".

== History ==
Growing up in New York City, Chardiet has been a prominent figure in the underground, experimental music scene since the age of 17. Her involvement in Far Rockaway's Red Light District collective helped inspire her to create her music.

Her self-titled debut EP was released on the BloodLust! label in 2009.

Signing to Sacred Bones Records, she released her first full-length album, Abandon, in 2013.

For her second full-length release, Bestial Burden, Chardiet stated that the main inspiration for the album was her abrupt surgery, explaining that her experiences made her feel a disconnect with her physical body and her mind. Pitchfork named "Bestial Burden" the 75th-best song of 2014.

The third Pharmakon album, Contact, was released by Sacred Bones on March 31, 2017.

Chardiet released her fourth full-length Pharmakon album, Devour, on August 30, 2019.

After a hiatus of almost five years, she announced her new album, Maggot Mass. It was released on October 4, 2024.

== Discography ==
- Pharmakon (2009, BloodLust!)
- Abandon (2013, Sacred Bones Records)
- Bestial Burden (2014, Sacred Bones Records)
- Contact (2017, Sacred Bones Records)
- Devour (2019, Sacred Bones Records)
- Maggot Mass (2024, Sacred Bones Records)
