= Calcabrina =

Demon in Dante's Inferno

Calcabrina is one of the demons featured in Inferno, the first canticle of Dante Alighieri's Divine Comedy. Calcabrina's name is possibly meant to mean "grace-stomper" or "frost trampler."

== In Dante's Divine Comedy ==
Calcabrina is a member of the Malebranche, a group of demons whose mission is to guard the fifth bolgia of the eighth circle of hell, the Malebolge, where grafters are punished. He is one of the ten devils that escorts Dante and Virgil through Malebolge by orders of the leader of Malebranche, the demon Malacoda.

The most notable mention of Calcabrina is when Alichino, a fellow demon, falls for the escape plan attempted by Bonturo Dati, one of the grafters punished in the bolgia. Calcabrina then decides to fly after the escaping sinner and ends up fighting with Alichino, who is also in pursuit, only for them to both fall into the boiling pitch.
