= Tersias =

2005 fantasy novel by G. P. Taylor

Tersias: The Oracle
- First edition
- Author: G. P. Taylor
- Language: English
- Series: Shadowmancer
- Genre: Fantasy novel, children's literature
- Publisher: Faber & Faber
- Publication date: 2005
- Publication place: United Kingdom
- Media type: Print (hardback & paperback)
- ISBN: 0-571-22046-0
- OCLC: 52057785
- LC Class: PZ7.T2134 Sh 2003
- Preceded by: Wormwood
- Followed by: The Shadowmancer Returns: The Curse of Salamander Street

Tersias is the second sequel to the fantasy novel Shadowmancer by G. P. Taylor and direct sequel to Wormwood. Tersias was followed in 2006 by The Shadowmancer Returns: The Curse of Salamander Street. Tersias has had two releases, one for the original copy and a second for a special edition version.

A short review in The Observer newspaper called the book a "vivid tale of sorcery and violence".

== Plot summary ==
The story starts off after Wormwood was destroyed and was sent to the dark side of the moon. Just as London was starting to recover from the disaster, Malachi, a magician, kept a blind boy named Tersias, who was the one that predicted the coming of the comet because he was an oracle. After some time, people began to know about the helpless child's "abilities". Many people wanted to use Tersias's powers for themselves: Malachi, himself; Jonah, a teenage highwayman and his partner, Tara; Solomon, a zealot, who plans on using his experiments (flesh-eating locusts) and Lord Malphas, a keeper of mysterious powers.
