= Baal in popular culture =

The Canaanite god Baal (sometimes Ba'al or Bael) in the Hebrew Bible is referenced in popular culture. Some influences in popular culture derive not from the Baal in the Hebrew Bible, but from Baal (demon) in 17th Century occult grimoires. Also Baal, through the New Testament Beelzebub, Lord of the Flies, is linked to Lucifer, or the Devil in popular culture.

== Film and television ==
- The fifth episode of American Horror Stories was titled "Ba'al," and the demon was portrayed by Dane DiLiegro.
- In the film The Rite, Father Lucas (Anthony Hopkins) is revealed to be possessed by the demon Baal. It alludes that this is the case throughout the film as cats and frogs are often present around Father Lucas' home.
- In the Stargate SG-1 television series, Baal is an alien who poses as an ancient Canaanite god.
- In the anime Digimon Fusion, a character named "Baalmon" is part of the Bagra Army, and joins with Mikey Kudo after evolving into Beelzemon.
- In the Ash vs Evil Dead TV series, Baal has been depicted as a humanoid demon who is able to drive people insane and manipulate them like puppets, also he's able to disguise himself by skinning a human and wearing their skin. He is mentioned as the father of Ruby's spawn, who are trying to raise him so he can take over the world. Baal finally appeared in the second season of the series played by Joel Tobeck, serving as the season's main antagonist.
- In Mobile Suit Gundam: Iron-Blooded Orphans, the ASW-G-01 Gundam Bael, the first Gundam-Frame Mobile Suit was named after the said demon.
- French TV miniseries, Les Compagnons de Baal (1968) is based on an evil fraternity of Baal's worshippers.

== Literature ==
- Baal is a character in the form of a fiery demon and beautiful man in Ascent of the Fallen by Travis A. Chapman.
- Baal (play) was Bertolt Brecht's first play, written 1918 and first performed in 1923

== Comics ==
- In xkcd, Baal is mentioned as "Ba'al the Annihilator" and "Ba'al, the Eater of Souls" in comic 1246 as well "Ba'al, the Soul Eater" in comics 1419 and 1638.
- In The Marvel Universe, Baal appears in the original Wolverine comic book series, issues #11-16, collectively called "The Gehenna Stone Affair." He is conceptualized as a demon who was worshipped by a cult of depraved sinners in Biblical times, before being destroyed by a divinely-guided warrior. A reincarnation of the original Baal has appeared in modern times and amassed a new cult of followers, who appear as cutthroat lowlifes who emulate vampires by wearing fake fangs and biting their victims, although they do not actually drink blood or possess any supernatural attributes. Baal is attempting to locate and reassemble the fragments of an ancient artifact known as the Gehenna Stone in order to regain his once mighty power, transform his followers into an army of actual vampires, and establish his reign over the earth.
- In Japanese manga Magi: The Labyrinth of Magic, Baal is the djinn from the first ever dungeon. He is one of Sinbad's seven Djinn. He is a lightning Djinn representing Wrath and Heroes.
- In the series The Wicked + The Divine, Baal is the first god to reincarnate in 2013 and a major character. He's represented as a well-dressed, arrogant, bisexual musician.

== Video games ==
- Bael appear in Fire Emblem: The Sacred Stones as giant spiders.
- Bael appear in Castlevania: Aria of Sorrow as a skinswap of the enemy Buer.
- Baal appears in the video game series Megami Tensei as a usable power.
- Baal appears as a boss in Devil May Cry 4, in the form of a giant white frog with protrusions from its back and tail, which are made of ice.
- In Bayonetta 2, Baal can be summoned from the depths of Inferno. It takes the form of a dark purple frog with a massive barbed tongue.
- 2 Baal (Spelled as "Ba'al") appear as difficult downloadable bosses in Bravely Default.
- In Bravely Second, Magnolia Arch, a main character, is revealed to be a "Ba'al Buster". In addition, the Ba'al from the first game return alongside several new Ba'al, retaining the role of downloadable bosses, except for one, which is fought during the main storyline.
- Baal also appears as a boss in many of the Disgaea games, as well as other NIS games, usually as an ultimate boss. His form varies from each game.
- Baal appears as the final boss in the Diablo II expansion pack Diablo II: Lord of Destruction from 2001.
- Baal is also the main character in the 2013 game Inspire. His appearance in this game is that of an imp, as he was summoned by an incompetent sorcerer.
- The protagonist in Baldur's Gate 1 and 2 is identified as a Child of 'Bhaal,' a deity also known as the 'God of Murder'. Children of Bhaal are also referred to as "Bhaalspawn".
  - Just like the protagonist of the previous two installments, Bhaalspawn feature in Baldur's Gate 3.
- Molag Bal is one of the Daedric princes in The Elder Scrolls Series.
- In Super Robot Wars games, Baal is a force that is known as "mankind's natural enemy". They appear every 12,000 years cycle to wipe out life in the universe.
- Baal appears in The Exorcist: Legion VR in Chapter 4 as a Two-Headed Demon responsible for an epidemic disease
- Baal appears in Iron Blade as a main boss.
- World of Warcraft (Legion Expansion) by Blizzard Entertainment: Ba'al is a hidden pet obtained by finding a series of Hidden pebbles around various places in Azeroth, then winning a battle pet fight.
- Bael appears in Bloodstained: Ritual of the Night as the final boss.
- Baal in Genshin Impact was the original Archon of Electro whose real name was Makoto. When she was killed, her twin sister Beelzebul took her place over as a sort of body double and became the "Raiden Shogun", who rules over the island nation of Inazuma in Teyvat and pursued eternity for her land.
- Baal appears in Cult of the Lamb as a servant of The One Who Waits, the game's primary antagonist. He appears as a black cat-like humanoid in white clothing.

== Songs ==
- The third track of the album Head Carrier by the American alternative rock band The Pixies is called "Baal's Back", and describes a human sacrifice to Baal causing the sky to go black as he returns to Earth.
- Exuma's album "Exuma II" has a track titled "Baal"
- The death metal act Morbid Angel has a track titled "Blades for Baal" off their 2011 album Illud Divinum Insanus.

== Role Playing Games ==
- In the role-playing game Dungeons & Dragons / Forgotten Realms, Bhaal is the God of Murder
- In the role-playing game Dungeons & Dragons, Bael is one of the nine archdevils in Baator
- In the role-playing game Vampire: the Masquerade, the Baali are a clan of infernal vampires of disambiguous origin, centered about the demonic connotations of Baal as a demon.

== Tabletop Games ==
- In Warhammer 40,000, Baal is the name of the homeworld of the Blood Angels Space Marines chapter.
