= The Shadowmancer Returns: The Curse of Salamander Street =

2007 novel by Graham Taylor

- First edition
- Author: G. P. Taylor
- Cover artist: David Wyatt
- Language: English
- Series: Shadowmancer
- Genre: Fantasy novel, children's literature
- Publisher: Faber & Faber
- Publication date: 2007
- Publication place: United Kingdom
- Media type: Print (hardback & paperback) & comic book
- ISBN: 978-0-571-23254-3
- OCLC: 84150954
- Preceded by: Tersias

The Shadowmancer Returns is a children's fantasy novel by G. P. Taylor, published in 2007. It is the fourth novel in Taylor's Shadowmancer series, following Tersias (2005), and a direct sequel to Shadowmancer (2002).

== Plot summary ==
In this sequel to Shadowmancer, Thomas, Kate, and Raphah flee from the evil sorcerer Demurral and head to London with Jacob Crane. Once there, their ship is seized and they are lured into the dark heart of the city. Further north, Raphah and Beadle set off on a terrifying journey in search of their friends; a journey haunted by mysterious enemies and a shadowy beast intent on their doom.

== Cultural allusions ==
Several myths and legends are incorporated into the story, such as the Wandering Jew, The Holy Grail and Black Dogs. Furthermore, Beadle remembers meeting a man from eastern Europe, who came to Whitby via shipwreck with a black dog, a reference to Bram Stoker's novel Dracula where the Count arrives at Whitby from a shipwreck in the shape of an enormous black dog.

== Reception ==
Booklist reviewed the novel.
