= G. P. Taylor =

English writer

- Born: Graham Peter Taylor; 1958 (age 67–68) Scarborough, North Riding of Yorkshire, England
- Occupation: Writer
- Language: English

Graham Peter Taylor (born 1958 in Scarborough, North Riding of Yorkshire, England), pen-name G. P. Taylor, is the author of the best-selling novels Shadowmancer, Wormwood, and Tersias. Before taking up writing full-time, he was a police officer, motorcyclist and former rock band roadie turned Anglican vicar in the village of Cloughton, North Yorkshire. Taylor has three children and currently resides in Whitby, North Yorkshire.

== Biography ==
Taylor grew up in Yorkshire, but moved to London in the 1970s where he worked in the music industry with such bands as The Stranglers, Sex Pistols, Elvis Costello, and Adam and the Ants. He became involved in the occult, and lived a life that was, in his own words "into all sorts of weird and wonderful things and wasn't leading a godly life". He then turned to Christianity, and he later became a vicar with the Church of England.

Taylor completed the manuscript of his first book, Shadowmancer, which he self-published. Following its launch at Taylor's local bookshop, The Whitby Bookshop, the title garnered a publishing deal with Faber & Faber in the UK and G. P. Putnam's Sons in the United States for a further six novels, following which he resigned his position as parish priest.

His second novel, Wormwood, was nominated for a Quill Award. His third novel, Tersias was published in the UK in 2005. In August 2006, Faber published a follow-up to Shadowmancer entitled The Curse of Salamander Street.

In October 2006, Taylor released The Tizzle Sisters & Erik through Markosia. A mixture of prose and graphic novel that he deemed an 'illustronovella', Taylor was joined on the book by collaborators Tony Lee, Dan Boultwood, and Harry Potter artist Cliff Wright.

He also contributed text to photographer Mark Denton's book on the Yorkshire coast.

Taylor retired from writing in October 2009 in order to care for his daughter, who suffers from Crohn's disease, although he went on to publish three more books in the years that followed.

In 2010, the first book of Vampyre Labyrinth series, RedEye, was published. The story follows a young Jago, who is a evacuee from London in war with the Germans in 1940. He is sent to Whitby, where he discovers a series of secrets and mysteries of vampyres.

== Mariah Mundi film ==
In 2008, Taylor signed a deal with film production company Entertainment Motion Pictures (E-Motion) to make a film based on Mariah Mundi series. The Adventurer: The Curse of the Midas Box was released in January 2014 to generally negative reviews. The film stars Michael Sheen, Lena Headey, Sam Neill, Ioan Gruffudd, and Aneurin Barnard as Mariah Mundi.

== Bibliography ==
=== Shadowmancer ===
- Shadowmancer (2003)
- Wormwood (2004)
- Tersias (2005)
- The Shadowmancer Returns: The Curse of Salamander Street (2006)

=== Mariah Mundi ===
- Mariah Mundi - The Midas Box (2007)
- Mariah Mundi and the Ghost Diamonds (2008)
- Mariah Mundi and the Ship of Fools (2009)

=== The Dopple Ganger Chronicles ===
- The First Escape (2008) (originally released as The Tizzle Sisters and Erik in 2006)
- The Secret of Indigo Moon (2009)
- The Great Mogul Diamond (2011)

=== Vampyre Labyrinth ===
- RedEye (September 2010)
- Dust Blood (January 2011)
- Oracle (July 2011)
