= Şeytan-ı Racim =

- Theatrical poster
- Directed by: Arkın Aktaç
- Written by: Murat Toktamışoğlu
- Starring: Bigkem Karavus; Burak Özçivit; Kurtulus Sakiragaoglu
- Music by: Reşit Gözdamla
- Production company: Dada Film
- Release date: September 13, 2013
- Running time: 116 minutes
- Country: Turkey
- Language: Turkish
- Box office: 2.144.928 TL

Şeytan-ı Racim is a 2013 Turkish horror film directed by Arkın Aktaç and screenwriter Murat Toktamışoğlu.

== Plot ==
Salih, who studied at the university in Istanbul, become curious about the magic, and this interest turned into an obsession over time. Salih, who gets in dependency of the Jinn, causes his friend Emrah to have recurring nightmares and he starts seeing shadows. Emrah, unable to cope with this, returns to his family in Izmit, but Salih is removed to a mental hospital. Since the nightmares and hallucinations did not end, his family, recommends to consults the copperman Mehmet Efendi who has lived through the experiences that have been infested before. He helps Emrah and Salih to get rid of the Jinn at first, but later, after realizing Salih intentionally summoned the Jinn and Emreh helped him even though unintentionally, Mehmet Efendi reveals his true identity as Azazil in the end.
