= Lapitch =

Lapitch (Croatian: Hlapić) is the main character of works of art called Čudnovate zgode šegrta Hlapića, which may refer to:

- The Brave Adventures of Lapitch, a 1913 novel by Ivana Brlić-Mažuranić
- Lapitch the Little Shoemaker (film), a 1997 animated film based on that book
- Lapitch the Little Shoemaker (TV series), a 2000 animated series
