= Devil in the arts and popular culture =

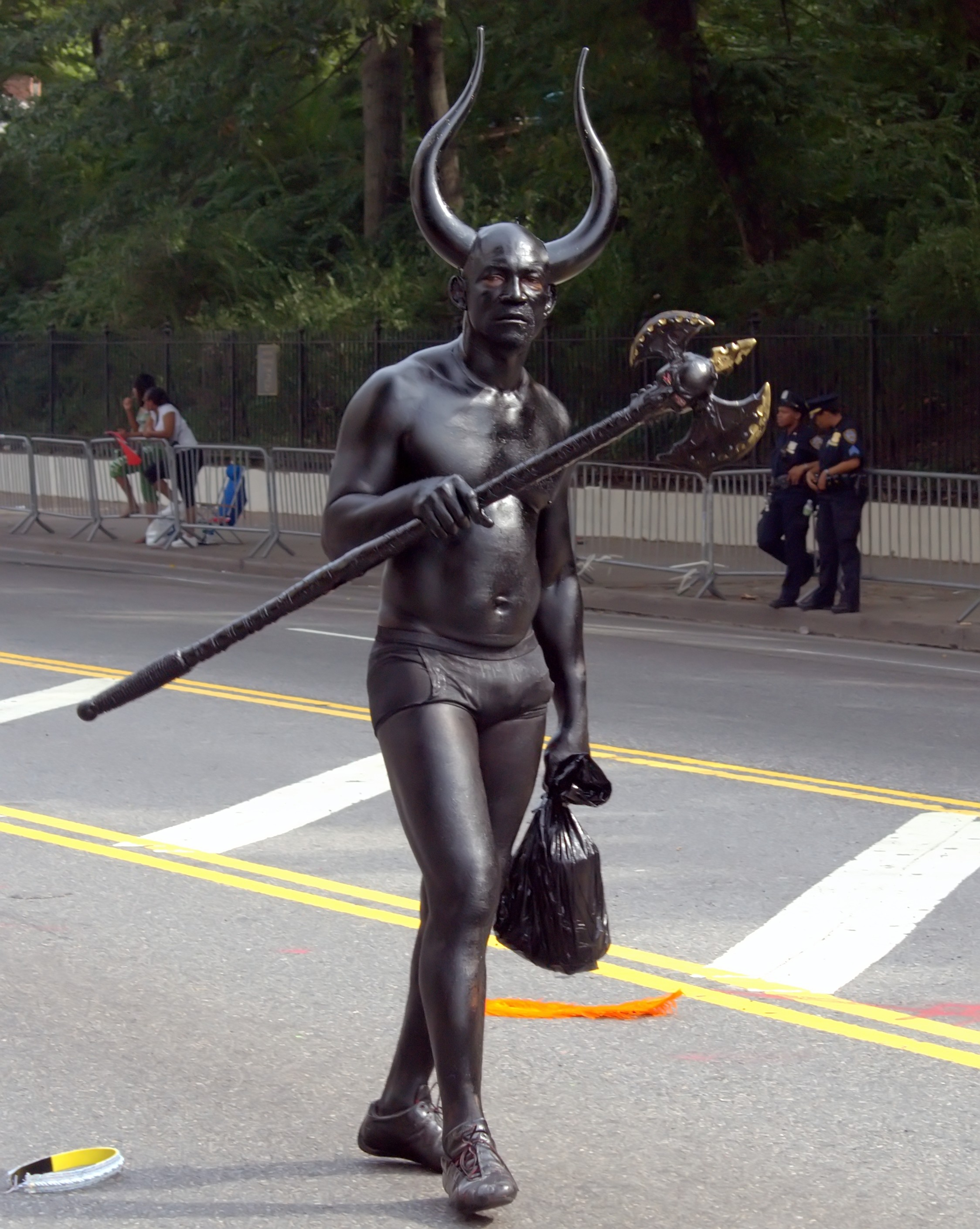
A man dressed as the Devil at New York City's West Indian Day Parade.

The Devil (Satan, Lucifer, Samael, Mephistopheles, Iblis) appears frequently as a character in literature and other media. In Abrahamic religions, the figure of the Devil or Satan personifies evil. Depictions of the devil first became prominent in Christianity in the 6th century when the Council of Constantinople officially recognized Satan as part of the Christian belief system.

When Satan is depicted in movies and television, he is often associated with various symbols, whether as a motif or in his physical design or costume. These include horns, tails, and wings. Satan is also associated with or may take the form of snakes, dragons, goats, or dogs. The color red is another common symbol, and may be incorporated by showing Satan with red skin, hair, or clothing. When trying to blend in or deceive someone, he is often represented as an ordinary human being, and sometimes only his voice is heard.

Although in medieval art Satan appears in forms of various genders, stations, or ages, in cinema of the United States he is most often male. In 1991, approximately a hundred million Americans believed in the devil.

== See also ==
- Deal with the Devil
- Genies in popular culture
- Inverted cross
- List of demons in fiction
- List of fictional Antichrists
- Satan (disambiguation)
- Morgoth
- Trigon
- Works based on Faust
