= Malebranche (Divine Comedy) =

Demons in the Inferno of Dante's Divine Comedy

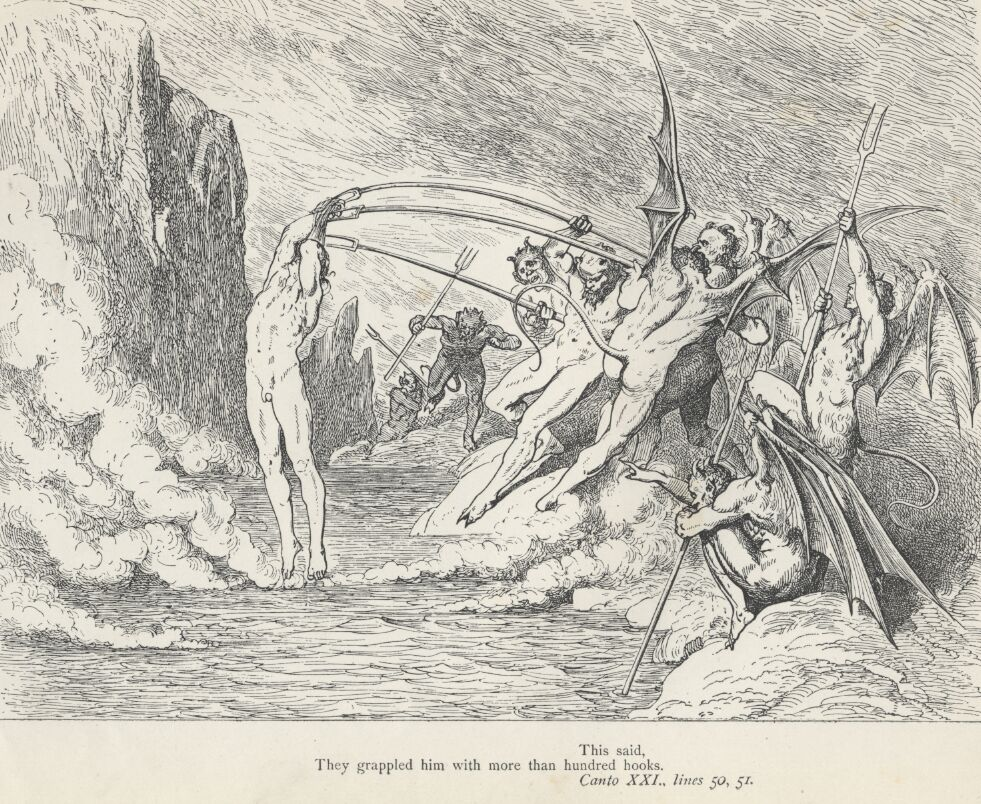
The Malebranche catch a sinner with their grappling hooks, portrayed by Gustave Doré.

The Malebranche (Italian: [ˌmaleˈbraŋke]; "Evil Claws") are the demons in the Inferno of Dante's Divine Comedy who guard Bolgia Five of the Eighth Circle (Malebolge). They figure in Cantos XXI, XXII, and XXIII. Vulgar and quarrelsome, their duty is to force the corrupt politicians (barrators) to stay under the surface of a boiling lake of pitch.

== In The Divine Comedy ==
When Dante and Virgil meet them, the leader of the Malebranche, Malacoda ("Evil Tail"), assigns a troop to escort the poets safely to the next bridge. Many of the bridges were destroyed in the earthquake at the crucifixion of Jesus, which Malacoda describes, enabling the time this takes place to be calculated. The troop hooks and torments one of the narrators (identified by early commentators as Ciampolo), who names some Italian grafters and then tricks the Malebranche to escape back into the pit. The demons are dishonest and malicious: the promise of safe conduct the poets have received turns out to have limited value (and there is no "next bridge"), so Dante and Virgil are forced to escape from them.

Within the Inferno, the demons provide some moments of satirical black comedy. There are twelve Malebranche named in the poem:

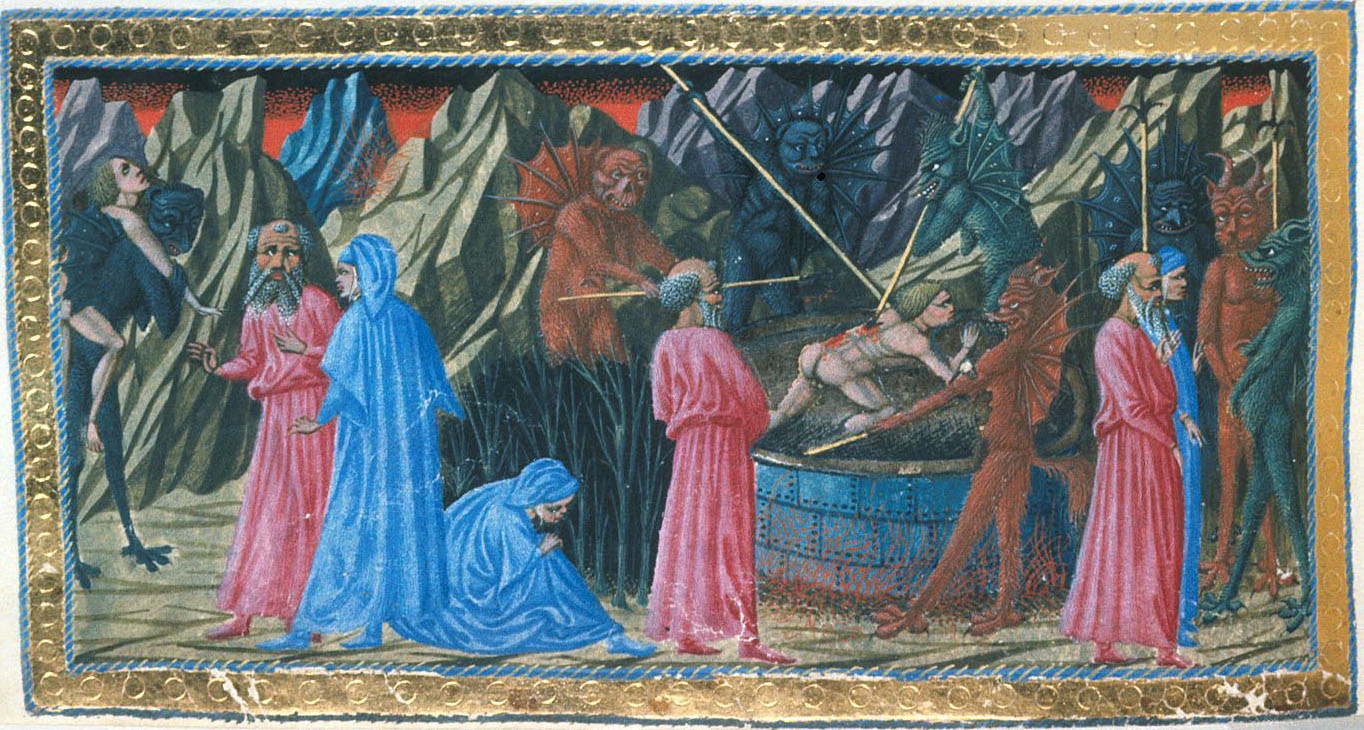
Dante (blue) and Virgil (red) in three scenes with the Malebranche, portrayed by Giovanni di Paolo.

- Alichino (derived from Arlecchino, the harlequin)
- Barbariccia ("Curly Beard")
- Cagnazzo ("Nasty Dog")
- Calcabrina (possibly "Grace Stomper" or "Frost Trampler")
- Ciriatto ("Wild Hog")
- Draghignazzo ("Nasty Sneering Dragon")
- Farfarello (possibly "Goblin")
- Graffiacane ("Dog Scratcher" or "Scratcher-dog")
- Libicocco (possibly "Libyan Hothead" or "Windy")
- Malacoda, the leader ("Evil Tail")
- Rubicante (possibly "Red-faced Terror" and a reference to Cante de' Gabrielli, who as Podestà of Florence condemned Dante to exile)
- Scarmiglione (possibly "Trouble Maker" or "Disheveled")

The last of these, for example, is introduced by Dante in lines 100–105 of Canto XXI:

They bent their hooks and shouted to each other:
And shall I give it to him on the rump?
And all of them replied, Yes, let him have it!

But Malacoda, still in conversation
with my good guide, turned quickly to his squadron
and said: Be still, Scarmiglione, still!

It is common among commentators on the Inferno to interpret these names as garbled versions of the names of officials contemporary to Dante. For example, Barbariccia may suggest the Ricci family of Florence, or the Barbarasi of Cremona.

== See also ==
- List of cultural references in The Divine Comedy
- Dante and his Divine Comedy in popular culture
- Malebranche in the Italian Wikipedia
