= Astaroth in popular culture =

Pop culture about Goetic demon Astaroth

The Goetic demon Astaroth, whose name is derived from Ashtoreth, the biblical spelling of the name of the Phoenician goddess Astarte, has appeared many times in modern popular culture.

== Film ==
- Der Golem, wie er in die Welt kam (1920), this silent film depiction of the "Golem of Prague" legend shows Rabbi Judah Loew summoning the demon Astaroth to reveal the Word that will bring the clay monster to life.
- Bedknobs and Broomsticks (1971), the Star of Astoroth is a magical artifact sought by the protagonists, previously belonging to a sorcerer of the same name.
- To the Devil a Daughter (1976).
- Ghoulies (1984), one of the demons summoned throughout the film.
- Extra Ordinary (2019), Christian Winter summons Astaroth to regain his popularity.

== Music ==
- Astaroth: Book of Angels Volume 1 (by Jamie Saft Trio, 2005).
- Referenced in the song "Consumite Furore" in the PC adventure game Phantasmagoria.
- Referenced in the song "At the Sound of the Demon Bell" by the heavy metal band Mercyful Fate.
- Referenced in the song "Black Dwarf" by the doom metal band Candlemass
- The song "Alone in the Dark" by Testament contains a reference to Astaroth.
- A song of the Spanish heavy metal group Mägo de Oz from their album Finisterra. Astaroth is also mentioned in several of their songs.
- Mentioned by the Swedish doom metal band Draconian in their songs "The Gothic Embrace" and "Serenade of Sorrow".
- Mentioned by Dio on the closing narration track of the 2000 concept album "Magica".
- Mentioned in the album Sacrifice by Black Widow as the demon they summon.
- Referenced in the title of California-based metalcore band Catherine's debut album Rumor Has It: Astaroth has Stolen Your Eyes.
- The seal of Astaroth is printed on (some editions of) the CD Ænima by the band Tool.
- Mentioned in the song "Slaying the Prophets Ov Isa" by the Polish death metal band Behemoth.
- The band Anticlone has a song called "Astaroth" on their 2016 release The Root Of Man.
- 17 lesser known metal (mainly black metal) bands are called Astaroth, as registered in the Encyclopedia Metallum.
- The seal of Astaroth is also present in the album artwork of Abrahadabra by Dimmu Borgir.
- The seal of Astaroth appears on the cover of Bruce Dickinson's (Iron Maiden) Best of CD released in 2001.
- Mentioned in the song "The Devils Bleeding Crown" by Danish Heavy/Rock band Volbeat.
- Jyrki 69 uses Astaroths emblem on his album cover for American Vampire in 2021.

== Literature ==
- A spirit commissioned by the Antichrist in Tim Lahaye and Jerry B. Jenkins Left Behind series.
- The arch-villain of Henry H. Neff's The Tapestry series.
- A character in Luigi Pulci's Renaissance epic Morgante.
- Astaroth, a 2001 novel by Croatian writer Ivo Brešan.
- Ashtaroth is mentioned in Gordon's poem in Keep the Aspidistra Flying by George Orwell.
- Made several appearances as the demonic uncle of the titular character in the comic book Hellboy.
- The chief enemy and brother of The Demiurge in the horror role-playing game Kult.
- A demon representing Sloth, one of the Seven Deadly Sins, in the manga Angel Sanctuary by Kaori Yuki.
- One of the many aliases of the Stephen King villain Randall Flagg.
- A daemon who appeared briefly in the Warhammer 40,000 comic Daemonifuge.
- Astaroth appeared in DC Comics as a Archfiend of Hell who is involved with the Gentleman Ghost's becoming a ghost in the first place.
- Astaroth appeared in the manga Ao no Exorcist as the first villain to fight Rin Okumura.
- Astaroth is a main antagonist in the latter parts of the GS Mikami manga.
- Astharoshe Asran is a character in the Trinity Blood series.
- Astaroth is the name of Ren Kouen's djinn in Magi: The Labyrinth of Magic.
- Astaroth (Roth), Crown Prince of Hell, is a major character in the romance series The Dark Elements by Jennifer Armentrout.
- Astaroth is shown on multiple occasions in the novel God's Demon by Wayne Douglas Barlowe.
- Astaroth appears as the main antagonist in issue 9-11 in Now Comics The Real Ghostbusters comic series.
- Astaroth is the name of the Gundam featured in the Mobile Suit Gundam: Iron-Blooded Orphans Steel Moon manga series.
  - It's also the name of a Gundam (as Ashtaron) in the Gundam X television-series.
- Astaroth is a key figure in he 1912 short story The Grove of Ashtaroth by John Buchan.
- Astaroth appeared in the manga Black Clover, as the third member of the devil trio ruling the underworld.
- Astaroth is the secondary antagonist of the young-adult fiction Demon Road Trilogy, written by Derek Landy.

== Television ==
- Astaroth appears in Strange as the Jewish and Christian Devil, as being the demon who rose in power until humanity worshipped him as the Devil.
- Blood Ties, the lead character has the seal of Astaroth magically tattooed on her wrists.
- Astaroth appears in an episode of Friday the 13th: The Series (season 3's "The Prophecies") as a fallen angel who seeks to fulfill six prophecies in the hopes of opening the doorway for Lucifer to walk the earth.
- Astaroth appears in the first episode of Ao No Exorcist as a demon who possessed a teenager and was exorcised by the protagonist's step-father, Fujimoto Shiro.
- Astaroth is the family name of Diodora Astaroth one of the antagonists in the anime High School DxD.
- Astaroth is a supporting character in the 2017 anime series Sin: Nanatsu no Taizai.
- Astaroth's sigil appears in the background of Truman's office in the last couple of episodes of Twin Peaks.
- Astamon is a demon Digimon based on Astaroth. In line with Astaroth being associated with Sloth, his digivolved form is Belphemon (based on Belphegor), the Demon Lord of Sloth and one of the (Seven) Great Demon Lords.
- In BBC's Apparitions, a powerful demon called Astaruth is the primary antagonist, possessing a former soldier named Michael.
- In the season 3 episode "Malleus Malleficarum" of the CW show Supernatural, Astaroth appears as a demon who takes souls in exchange for magical power.
- Astaroth is referenced several times in the series 7 episode "The Day of the Devil" of the British show Inspector Morse.
- Astaroth is referenced in "Aurora", the ninth episode of Tracker.

== Gaming ==
- NeverDead, the main villain is Astaroth, who kills the main character's beloved and making him an immortal demon lord who will suffer for eternity.
- Catherine, Astaroth (voiced by Yuri Lowenthal) is revealed as the demon who orchestrates, along with Dumuzid, a curse against men who have thoughts of infidelity.
- Dungeons & Dragons role-playing game, Astaroth appears as a deity for those of chaotic evil alignment.
- Final Fantasy II, Astaroth is a boss fought near the end of the game. Another version of this boss is also fought in Final Fantasy IV: The After Years.
- King Gondias is the final boss in the original Ghosts 'n Goblins and a boss character in Ghouls 'n Ghosts. Starting in Super Ghouls 'n Ghosts, the character's name was changed to Astaroth. A character, similar in appearance and attack to him, also appears as a mid-boss in Rosenkreuzstilette Freudenstachel.
- Grand Chase, Astaroth is the mini-boss in Mana Valley with his pet Mynos, who was behind the downfall of Xenia continent Gods.
- MagnaCarta II, Astaroth is a sentinel, some kind of powerful golem from eons past used by the northern forces and that we are condemned to fight in Old Fox Canyon.
- MapleStory, Astaroth used to be a boss at the end of Adventurer's quests, until a later revamp which removed those quests.
- Shinra Bansho, a more notable character depicted in one of the trading cards found in Chocolate Wafer packages in Japan is the Demon General Astaroth, a high ranking blue skinned demoness.
- Omikron: The Nomad Soul computer game, the prince of demons and enemy of Kushulai'n is named Astaroth.
- Painkiller: Resurrection, Astaroth appears to the hero at the end of the second level, announcing himself as one of the generals in Lucifer's army.
- Phantasmagoria, Asteroth is the main antagonist.
- Sacrifice, Astaroth is a Demon Lord, summoned through the Demon Gate of Golgotha, by the God of Slaughter, to fight the demon Marduk.
- Shadow Hearts: Covenant video game, Astaroth appears as one of the main boss enemies as well as a crest that gives the characters magical abilities.
- Shin Megami Tensei: Devil Survivor, Astaroth appears as a demon.
- Astarot, Asutarotto in Japanese (アスタロット), appears in the card game and snack food Shinra-Bansho and is a blue-skinned female version.
- Soul Calibur series of video games, a golem named Astaroth is a playable character.
- Ultima V, Astaroth is the name of the Shadowlord of Hatred
- Astarte is a demonic assistant in the game Devil's Deception.
- Astaroth is a wood and dark attribute demon monster in the mobile game Puzzle & Dragons, along with her series-mates Baal, Belial, and Amon.
- Ianzuma Eleven 3, the Goalkeeper of a post-game team is named Astaroth.
- Inazuma Eleven GO 2: Chrono Stone, post-game character, Asta, as well as his Keshin are both named after Astaroth.
- Astaroth appears in mobile phone game Doodle Devil as an unlockable character for a game mode named "Demon Battle". Astaroth appears in this mode alongside Baal, Chimera, Cthulhu, Kronos, Mammon, Medusa, Shub-Niggurath, and a "demon" known as Succubus.
- White Noise 2, Astaroth is a playable character. Along with several other creatures in the game, he has abilities that can be used to attack the group of investigators, the creature's main objective.
- Genshin Impact, the God of Moments, Time and Thousand Winds, Istaroth. Her name is derived from Astaroth. She plays an unknown yet very important role in the lore of the game, and has been mentioned in the stories of multiple regions within the game.
- Astaroth is a recurrent antagonist in the 2017 game Faith: The Unholy Trinity. He is depicted as Gary Miller, a human-like personification of the demon.
- Diablo IV, Astaroth is a demon and a lieutenant of Mephisto, The Lord of Hatred. Astaroth is responsible for maintaining the hellfire barrier that surrounds the Cathedral of Hatred.
- Solium Infernum, Astaroth is one of the playable lieutenants of hell vying for ascension to Lucifer's vacant throne. Astaroth's unique units and stat array lend toward the most directly aggressive and combat-oriented of the diabolical roster.
- Astaroth is mentioned twice in Fireproof Studio's, The Room. It is found on notes six and seven during chapter three and four.
