= Shadowmancer =

2002 novel by G.P. Taylor

- First edition
- Author: G. P. Taylor
- Language: English
- Series: Shadowmancer
- Genre: Fantasy novel, children's novel
- Publisher: Mount Publishing Ltd
- Publication date: 2002
- Publication place: United Kingdom
- Media type: Print (hardback and paperback) & comic book
- ISBN: 0-571-22046-0
- OCLC: 52057785
- LC Class: PZ7.T2134 Sh 2003
- Followed by: Wormwood

Shadowmancer is a fantasy novel by G. P. Taylor, first published privately in 2002. It is a Christian allegory in the form of a fantasy adventure, akin to C. S. Lewis's The Chronicles of Narnia. Taylor wrote the book to counteract what he saw as a rise in atheist propaganda in children's books such as His Dark Materials. It is the first of four books generally referred to as The Shadowmancer Quartet. The book was a number one best seller in the UK and the US.

Two thematic sequels named Wormwood and Tersias were also released soon after. A direct sequel named The Shadowmancer Returns: The Curse of Salamander Street that follows on where Shadowmancer left off was released in 2007.

The book has garnered some controversy for its negative portrayal of witches and pagans, whom it claims have been tricked by and worship the Devil. Despite this, Taylor claims to be "an authority on Wicca and paganism".

== Plot summary ==
The story takes place in Whitby and concerns the evil sorcerer Reverend Obadiah Demurral who is seeking two powerful amulets, called the Keruvim, which he plans to use to control the elements and dominate the world. At the start of the book he purchases the first Keruvim (which takes the form of a golden statuette of a cherub) from an Ethiopian mercenary named Gebra Nubera.

He then uses the Keruvim to destroy a ship upon which the next Keruvim is prophesied to arrive, but when he surveys the wreckage he finds nothing.

The next day an Ethiopian boy named Raphah arrives searching for the Keruvim. He befriends the main character, an urchin named Thomas and reveals that he is a messenger from God (referred to as Riathamus here), and that Demurral is a Shadowmancer, a sorcerer who can control the dead. Despite not believing in God, Thomas agrees to assist Raphah in regaining the Keruvim because he wants revenge on Demurral for evicting him and his dying mother from their home.

They pursue Demurral and the Keruvim with the assistance of Thomas's tomboy friend Kate and the mysterious smuggler, Jacob Crane. During the story, Raphah, Kate and Jacob Crane, who all for their own individual reasons did not believe in God, do come to believe in him.

Eventually it is revealed that, in using the Keruvim, Demurral has unleashed a demonic race called the Glashan who were imprisoned at the dawn of time for rebelling against God. Led by the evil Pyratheon (the Devil), they join forces with Demurral so that they can find the other Keruvim and harness its power to overthrow God and rule the universe.

It is eventually revealed that Raphah is the other Keruvim, so Demurral and Pyratheon try to capture him, so that they can kill him and turn him into an Azimuth (a slave spirit) to activate the Keruvim's full power.

At the climax of the story Thomas, Kate and Raphah meet an angel referred to as a Seruvim (a play on the word Seraphim) named Raphael, who goes by the alias Abram Rickards. A showdown takes place in Demurral's church during which Raphah is killed and Pyratheon obtains the Keruvim. He recites the incantation to activate its power and the world is temporarily plunged into night. Pyratheon thinks he has succeeded in stealing the power of God and gloats, but Abram then reveals that while Raphah is dead it has no power and all Pyratheon has done is meddle with time. After Abram restores life to Raphah, the sun rises, Abram is revealed in his true form and Pyratheon and Demurral flee.

Abram tells Thomas, Kate and Jacob Crane to take the Keruvim away to another land so they leave aboard Crane's ship, The Magenta, but in the closing page of the book it is revealed that they are being stealthily pursued by sea-demons known as Seloth.

== Characters ==
- Thomas Barrick is a rebellious but nihilistic street-urchin who harbours great resentment towards Obadiah Demurral for evicting himself and his sick mother from their home. He is the main character as most of the story is told from his point of view. His tough exterior masks a more vulnerable side. Ultimately he comes to accept God from his time spent with Raphah.
- Kate Coglan is Tom's tomboy best friend who has always played the role of a big sister to him. It is stated that she "never cries" but soon after her introduction, when she encounters the demons at Demurral's command, her strong exterior disintegrates and she is revealed to be weak and ineffective when faced with true adversity. Throughout the book, she is shown to initially be cowardly, useless and dependent on others, until her resolve strengthens through her friendship with Thomas Raphah.
- Raphah is a young holy man from Ethiopia with divine powers from God. A healer with a gentle, humorous disposition, he reveals a fiery side to his personality whenever confronted with evil or injustice. He is searching for the Keruvim, unaware that he himself is its twin.
- Jacob Crane is a charismatic and sardonic smuggler who dresses in an elegant, dandified manner. Crane is strong, independent and opportunistic. Despite his veneer of selfishness and cynicism, he is an honourable man and genuinely cares about saving the world.
- Obadiah Demurral is the main antagonist of the book, an evil sorcerer with an embittered, abrasive personality. While he was once a devout man of God, self-loathing and hardship drove him into evil. Demurral is shown to possess a deeply sadistic nature but is given to surprising moments of empathy. It is implied that he is not quite as powerful as he pretends to be.
- Pyratheon is a demonic figure in the story, described as a tall, "beautiful" man with red hair and blue eyes. He is the leader of the Glashan, a demonic race who were imprisoned for trying to steal the power of God and is worshipped as a deity by witches and sorcerers. He has power over all dark creatures on earth and is described by Demurral as "the dark god of the universe". A Machiavellian figure, he is shown to be charming, witty, cold, calculating but with occasional fits of rage that cause him to act impulsively. In Wormwood, it is revealed that he is the younger brother of Lilith.
- Abram Rickards/Raphael is a sharp-tongued angel with an eye for fashion. Raphael joins Thomas, Kate, Raphah and Jacob Crane during the latter part of their journey and wields a potent weapon known as the Sword of Mayence. He is a formidable fighter with misanthropic tendencies and an acerbic sense of humour.

== Other media ==
=== Special edition ===
A special edition of Shadowmancer was released in 2003 containing an extra chapter that carried on where the book had left off. In the extra chapter Raphah and the Keruvim are snatched by the Seloth. Special editions of Wormwood and Tersias were also released.

=== Film rights ===
A film adaptation of the novel was announced by Taylor, Fortitude Films, and Universal Pictures in 2004. Fortitude wanted Mel Gibson to direct, and Donald Sutherland to play Demurral and Sean Bean to play Jacob Crane. Fortitude paid Taylor $1 million for Shadowmancer and $1.8 million for Wormwood.

=== Graphic novel ===
A graphic novel adaptation of the first novel was published in 2023 by British independent comic book publishing company Markosia.

== Locations ==
Reverend Obadiah Demurral's vicarage is based on the main building of Fyling Hall School.

== Sequel ==
At the end of Shadowmancer, the effects of Pyratheon's use of the Keruvim to distort time and reality is also the beginning of G. P. Taylor's follow-up novel, Wormwood. The book's main protagonist, Dr. Sabian Blake, is studying the comet Wormwood when the sky-quake from the north hits the city of London.
