= Devour (Pharmakon album) =

Studio album by Pharmakon
- Released: August 30, 2019
- Length: 36:05
- Label: Sacred Bones

Pharmakon chronology
Contact (2017)	Devour (2019)	Maggot Mass (2024)

Singles from Devour
- 1. "Self-Regulating System" Released: July 9, 2019; 2. "Spit It Out" Released: August 7, 2019

Professional ratings
Aggregate scores
Source	Rating
Metacritic	83/100
Review scores
Source	Rating
AllMusic	4/5 stars
Exclaim!	8/10
Pitchfork	7.9/10

Devour is the fourth studio album by musician Margaret Chardiet under her music project Pharmakon. It was released by Sacred Bones Records on August 30, 2019.

The first and lead single from the album Self-Regulating System was released on July 9, 2019. The second single Spit It Out followed on August 7, 2019.

== Critical reception ==
Devour was met with universal acclaim from critics. At Metacritic, which assigns a weighted average rating out of 100 to reviews from mainstream publications, this release received an average score of 83, based on 10 reviews.

=== Accolades ===
Accolades for Devour
Publication	Accolade	Rank	Ref.
No Ripcord	Top 50 Albums of 2019	34	
Noisey	Top 100 Albums of 2019	77	
Treble	Top 50 Albums of 2019	9	

== Track listing ==
No.	Title	Length
1.	"Homeostasis"	4:07
2.	"Spit It Out"	7:32
3.	"Self Regulating System"	6:22
4.	"Deprivation"	7:52
5.	"Pristine Panic/Cheek by Jowl"	10:12
