= Wormwood (Taylor novel) =

2004 novel by G. P. Taylor

- First edition
- Author: G. P. Taylor
- Language: English
- Series: Shadowmancer
- Genre: Fantasy novel, children's literature
- Published: 2004 (Faber & Faber)
- Publication place: United Kingdom
- Media type: Print (hardback & paperback)
- Preceded by: Shadowmancer
- Followed by: Tersias

Wormwood is a fantasy sequel to G. P. Taylor's Shadowmancer. It follows the adventures of Dr. Sabian Blake and his servant girl, Agetta Lamian. The novel is a Christian allegory.

Like its predecessor, it was criticised for attacking other religions, but Taylor professed that the work was against the Kabbalah.

== Plot ==
The story takes place in London, where Dr. Sabian Blake is sitting in his attic at the top of his house in Bloomsbury Square, looking out to space through his telescope, in search of a special star. He is told about this star by The Nemorensis, an ancient book that holds many old and powerful secrets. It has predicted that the comet Wormwood (which was foretold in the Book of Revelation) is hurtling towards the earth and would spell certain doom for London and all other lands around her. As Blake is observing this, a series of cataclysmic and destructive events, referred to as a 'sky-quake', hits the city, the aftermath of which involves horses and dogs going completely mad and attacking everyone in sight. The reason for these happenings was that the power of the Keruvim was being used in the north by the evil Pyratheon, in his vain attempt to overthrow Riathamus. Sabian Blake meets Agetta Lamian, Blake's servant-girl, whose father Cadmus Lamian owns a lodging house on Fleet Street.

Eventually it transpires that Pyratheon's evil sister, Yerzinia, is using the Nemorensis to call down the comet and reshape the devastated London in her own, dark image.
