= Scarmiglione =

Demon in Dante's Inferno

Scarmiglione is one of the twelve named Malebranche in the 8th Circle of Hell's 5th Gulf, where corrupt politicians are immersed in burning pitch, the Malebolge, from the Inferno of Dante Alighieri's Divine Comedy.

== In popular culture ==
- Final Fantasy series:
  - In the Dawn of Souls and 20th anniversary remakes of Final Fantasy I, Scarmiglione is the name of an optional boss.
  - In Final Fantasy IV, Scarmiglione is the name of the Archfiend of Earth
  - In Final Fantasy IV: The After Years, Scarmiglione is again a boss.
  - In Dissidia, Scarmiglione is a summon.
  - In Final Fantasy XIV: Endwalker, Scarmiglione is one more time a boss.
- In the 2012 video game Resident Evil: Revelations, Scarmiglione is a large, hulking shark-based creature.
- The card game Yu-Gi-Oh! features a series of cards called Burning Abyss, which is based on the Divine Comedy, one of which is known as "Scarm, Malebranche of the Burning Abyss".
- In the popular Manga and Anime series, Fairy Tail, a legal magical guild is named Scarmiglione.
- In Granblue Fantasy: Relink, Scarmiglione appears as a boss.

== See also ==
- Divine Comedy in popular culture
- Malebranche in the Italian Wikipedia
