= Devour (video game) =

2021 video game

- Developer: Straight Back Games
- Publisher: Straight Back Games
- Release: January 28, 2021
- Modes: Single-player, multiplayer

Devour is a co-op PvE horror video game created by developers Straight Back Games, playable by between 1 and 4 players. The game was released in 2021, with four more maps having been released as of 2023.

== Setting and plot ==
The game is set in the same universe as a 2020 PC game called The Watchers. Players control members of a demonic cult called the Watchers of Azazel who become aware that their leader Anna (or another cult member in other maps) is trying to raise the goat demon. Either finding or knowing that Azazel has possessed their comrade, the other members who arrive attempt to stop them and undo or prevent damage.

== Gameplay ==
The core mechanic of Devour is the destruction of ten totems (whether goats, eggs, or rats). For the original two maps "The Farmhouse" and "The Asylum", as well as the fifth map "The Slaughterhouse" this takes the form of finding a fuel item and then destroying the totem with it. For the later maps "Inn" and "Town", the totems themselves must be prepared at one location before being destroyed at another, slowing progress.

Threats to the player come in two forms - the primary demon of the specific map and swarms of lesser hostiles. The primary demon moves around the full map, before switching into pursuit of a player. If successful, the player is downed and will be dragged to a random location on the map (The Farmhouse and The Asylum), be dragged to a specific location (The Inn), or be outright killed (The Town and The Slaughterhouse). On The Town and The Slaughterhouse, dead players will be banished to a different dimension, and will have to fight off the lesser demons to survive. Once they kill enough of them, they will be sent back to the main map. The speed, rate of pursuit, and difficulty to stagger, all increase as totems are destroyed. The lesser hostiles spawn in randomly across the map. Unlike the primary demon, they require several seconds of contact to down a player and can be directly destroyed by the player. As totems are destroyed, spawn rate increases significantly. In the event that all party members are simultaneously downed, the game is lost.

Players can resist being downed by fleeing hostiles or by use of the UV-mode of the flashlight each carries. This is a finite, recharging resource that destroys lesser hostiles and can stagger the primary demon. The amount of time required to stagger the primary demon increases over time.

There are additional items found around each map. These include keys to open up the map, with some rooms not being available until one or more totems are destroyed. It also includes medkits to resuscitate downed party members and batteries as an additional UV source.

== Development ==
Devour was created by Joe Fender & Luke Fanning, the two developers of indie game studio Straight Back Games as their second game. Originally released on the 28th January 2021 with the single map "Farmhouse", four additional free maps have been released, starting with the rat-themed Asylum on April 21, 2021.

== Reception ==
Reception for the game has been generally positive, with particular focus on its frightening atmosphere, good value, and positive referrals to Phasmophobia, which entered early access four months prior to the release of Devour. Gamesradar approved of its "highly stressful, fast-paced, downright scary experience".
