= Ciampolo =

Character in Dante's Divine Comedy

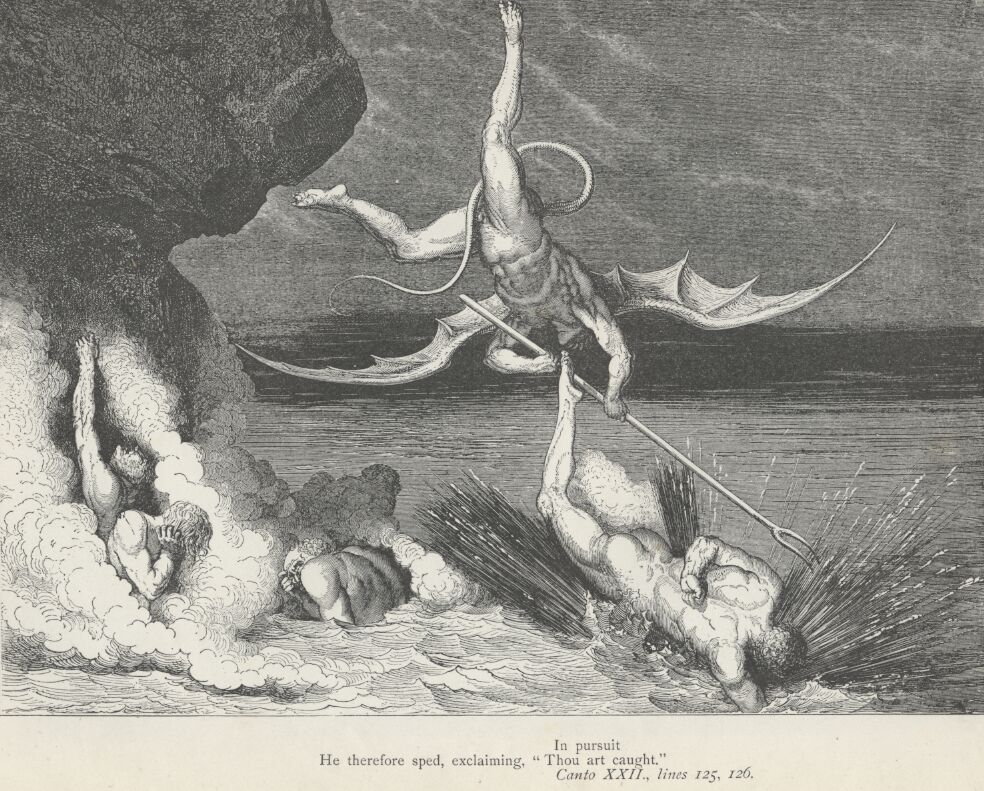
Ciampolo escapes back into the pitch

Ciampolo (also Giampolo, "John Paul") is the accepted name of a character in Dante's Divine Comedy.

Ciampolo appears in Canto XXII of the Inferno, where he is a grafter in the fifth ditch of the eighth circle. Ciampolo is hooked by the devils (the Malebranche, "Evil Claws") who patrol that ditch, and pulled out of the boiling pitch where the grafters are immersed, which represents their sticky fingers and corrupt deals. Threatened by the devils, Ciampolo tells Dante the identity of some of the other grafters punished there. Ciampolo eventually tricks the devils, and makes his escape back to the boiling pitch.

Dante does not identify Ciampolo by name, but his name was provided by early commentators. Nothing else is really known about him other than the information provided by Dante: that he was born in Navarre, that his father was a wastrel, and that he served King Theobald II of Navarre.
