= Bonturo Dati =

Italian leader (died 1324)

Bonturo Dati (died 1324) was an early 14th-century leader of the liberals in Lucca. He expelled his political enemies in 1308, gaining control of the government of the city. Boasting that he would put an end to barratry, ironically he became famous for his venality. According to Benvenuto, he controlled the entire municipality, through bribes he could appoint and dismiss anyone he wanted.

Dati is famous for provoking a war with Pisa in 1313, that is commemorated in Faida di Comune by Giosuè Carducci. He is featured in Dante Alighieri's Divine Comedy, where he is punished in Circle Eight, Bolgia Five.
