= Mister B. Gone =

2007 novel by Clive Barker

- First edition
- Author: Clive Barker
- Cover artist: Clive Barker
- Language: English
- Genre: Horror
- Publisher: Harper
- Publication date: 27 October 2007
- Publication place: United Kingdom
- Media type: Print (hardcover)
- Pages: 256
- ISBN: 978-0-06-018298-4
- OCLC: 175222018
- Dewey Decimal: 823/.914 22
- LC Class: PR6052.A6475 M57 2007

Mister B. Gone is a short metafiction novel by Clive Barker, published in the United Kingdom and the United States in October 2007.

== Plot summary ==
A narrator attempts to convince the reader to burn the book they are currently reading, but eventually reluctantly agrees to tell his story, and introduces himself as a lesser demon named Jakabok Botch, who lived a traumatised childhood in Hell, especially due to his brutish, physically abusive demon of a father. To prevent himself from losing his mind, Jakabok decides to write violent, hate-filled papers in which he commits torture and patricide.

After Jakabok accidentally and severely burns himself, his father finds out about the journal and threatens to kill Jakabok, who flees until he is captured by a magical fishing net, which hauls him into the human world. Jakabok finds himself in 14th-century Europe, where he has a series of often comical adventures, sometimes as a lone traveller and sometimes in partnership with a more experienced and powerful demon he befriends.

Jakabok reveals the means by which he became imprisoned in the book. Finding Heaven and Hell locked in combat over Johannes Gutenberg's first printing press, he then discovers them secretly meeting to determine how Heaven and Hell will divide the rights to various forms of publication. Discovering Jakabok eavesdropping, they use the press to turn him into the book.

Throughout the story, Jakabok repeatedly tries to get the reader to burn the book, first by asking, then by pleading, then bribery, and finally by threatening. After realising that the reader is heartless and cold, he gives up on asking, and reveals that doing so would have set him free to kill the reader. He ends the book by suggesting that the reader give the book to someone they hate, and warns them to be cautious, as they now know the secret Heaven and Hell sought to keep by imprisoning him.
