= Alichino (devil) =

Demon in Dante's Inferno

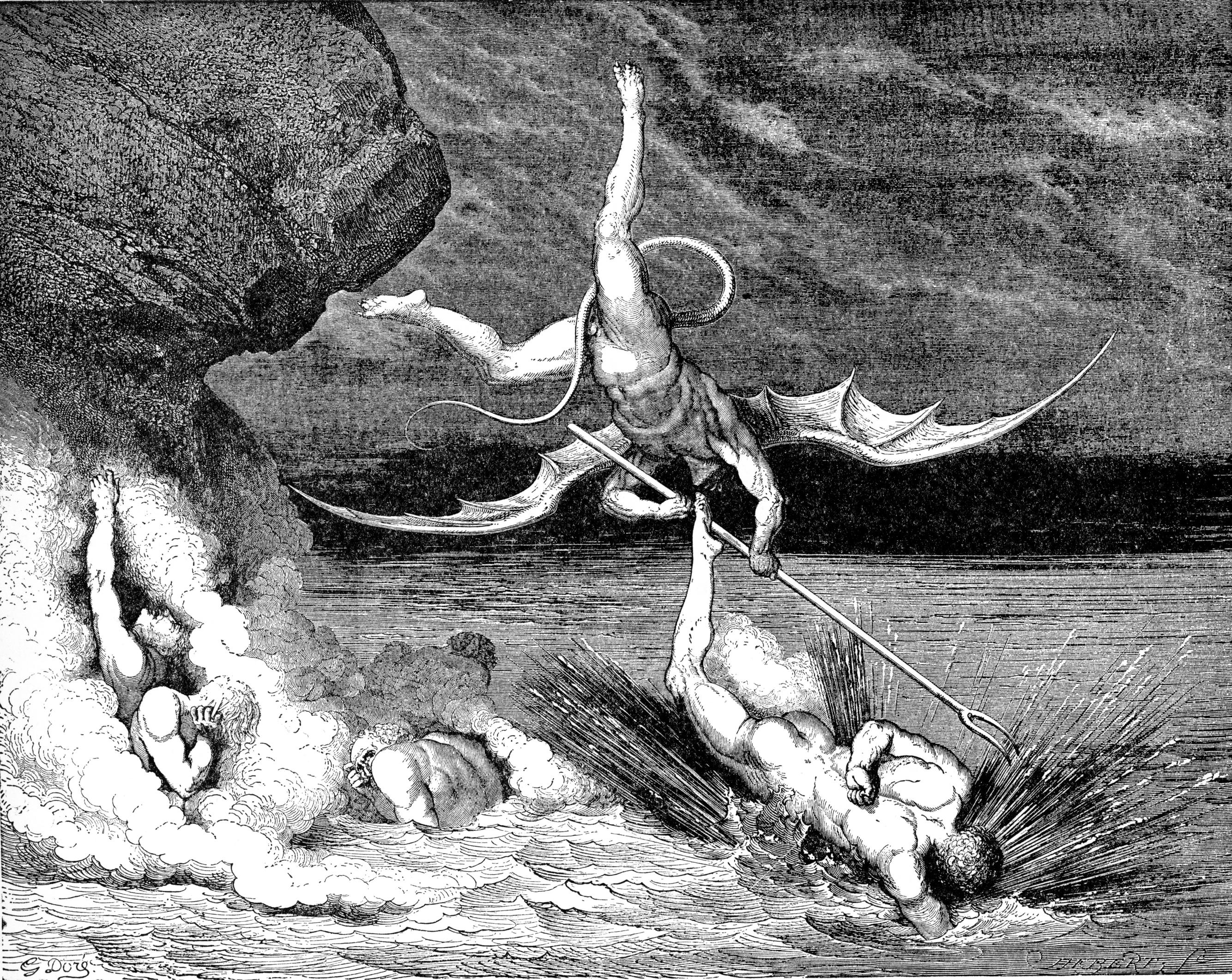
Alichino trying to catch the escaping sinner Ciampolo of Navarre

Alichino is one of the devils in the Inferno of Dante Alighieri's Divine Comedy. Alichino is a member of the Malebranche, whose mission is to guard Bolgia Five in the Eighth Circle, the Malebolge. Alichino's name is commonly regarded as a garbled version of the Italian word for harlequin, Arlecchino, perhaps for his flying attempt to catch Ciampolo of Navarre in his escape (see picture). His only significant contribution to the plot is when he persuades the other devils to leave Ciampolo of Navarre alone. Ciampolo is supposed to summon other sinners from the lake of boiling pitch (that don't dare to appear when the devils are near), on request by Dante (who wants to speak with them). But Ciampolo doesn't call at his friends. Instead, he fools the devils and escapes back to the lake, and Alichino tries in vain to catch him. This causes a fight between Alichino and Calcabrina, which causes them to fall into the lake. The other devils put the blame on Virgil and Dante, though and hunt them vexed.

The following strophes depict when Ciampolo fools the devils:

"If you desire either to see or hear,"
The terror-stricken recommenced thereon,
"Tuscans or Lombards, I will make them come.

But let the Malebranche cease a little,
So that these may not their revenges fear,
And I, down sitting in this very place,

For one that I am will make seven come,
When I shall whistle, as our custom is
To do whenever one of us comes out."

Cagnazzo at these words his muzzle lifted,
Shaking his head, and said: "Just hear the trick
Which he has thought of, down to throw himself!"

Whence he, who snares in great abundance had,
Responded: "I by far too cunning am,
When I procure for mine a greater sadness."

Alichino held not in, but running counter
Unto the rest, said to him: "If thou dive,
I will not follow thee upon the gallop,

But I will beat my wings above the pitch;
The height be left, and be the bank a shield
To see if thou alone dost countervail us."

O thou who readest, thou shalt hear new sport!
Each to the other side his eyes averted;
He first, who most reluctant was to do it.

The Navarrese selected well his time;
Planted his feet on land, and in a moment
Leaped, and released himself from their design.

Whereat each one was suddenly stung with shame,
But he most who was cause of the defeat;
Therefore, he moved, and cried: "Thou art o'ertakern."

But little it availed, for wings could not
Outstrip the fear; the other one went under,
And, flying, upward he his breast directed;
