= Malacoda =

Demon in Dante's Inferno

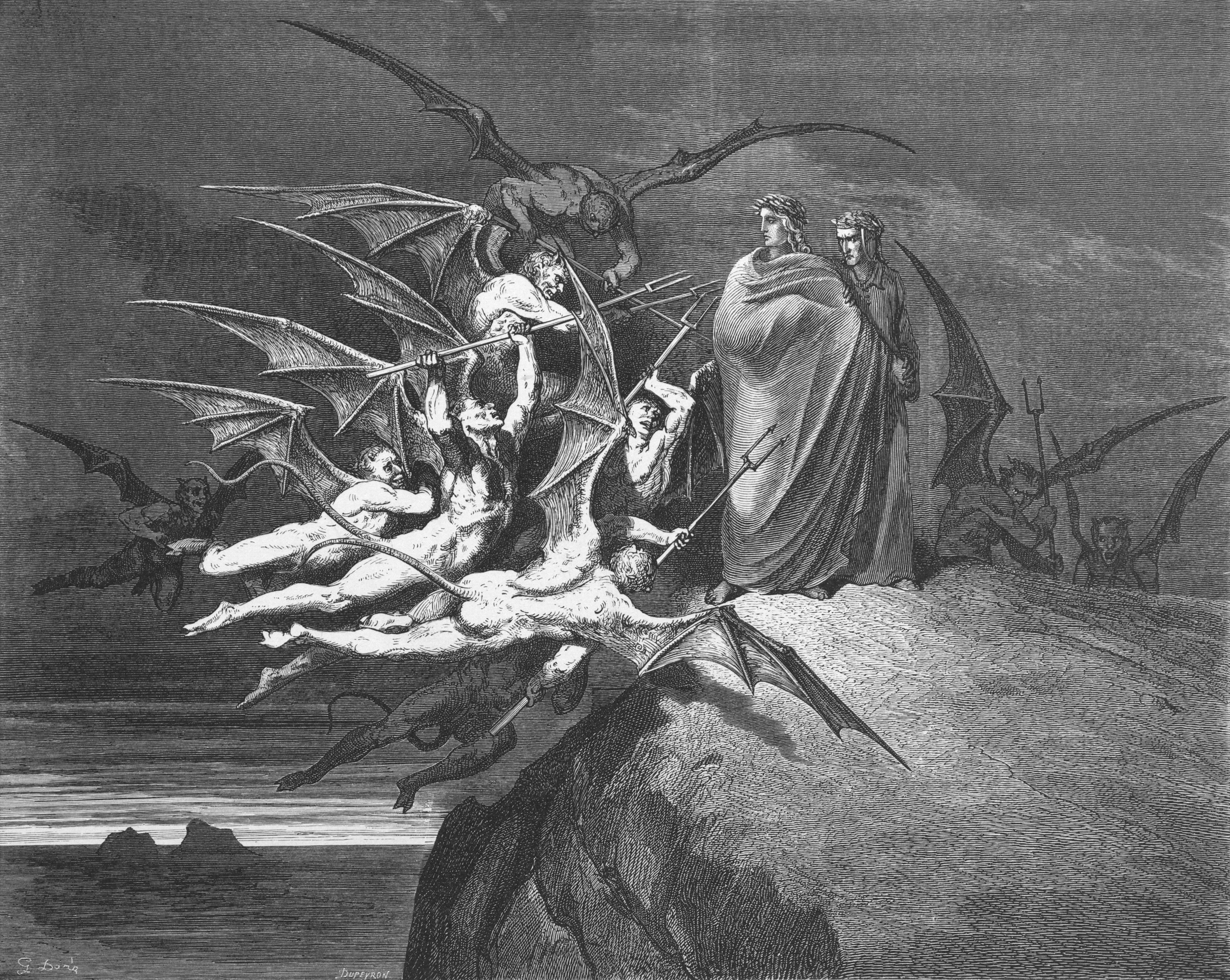
Malacoda and his squadron of Malebranche threaten Virgil and Dante in the fifth Bolgia, portrayed by Gustave Doré.

Malacoda is a character in Dante Alighieri's Inferno (Cantos 21-2), where he features as the leader of the Malebranche, the twelve demons who guard Bolgia Five of Malebolge, the eighth circle of Hell. The name Malacoda is roughly equivalent to "bad tail" or "evil tail" in Italian. Unlike other characters such as Geryon, which are based on mythical characters, Malacoda was invented by Dante and is not a mythological reference.

He with his fiends guard the grafters, caught in boiling pitch to represent their sticky-fingered deals, torturing with grappling hooks whoever they can reach. Dante and Virgil gain a safe conduct from him (Malacoda) and he allows the poets to cross to the next Bolgia. However, Malacoda lies to the poets about the existence of bridges over the sixth Bolgia, making him less a help and more an impediment. In the Inferno it does not state whether or not Malacoda chases the poets after his demons Grizzly (Barbariccia) and Hellken (Alichino) fall into the boiling pit of pitch. All the Inferno states is that the poets were being chased by the fiends before they escaped by sliding down a bank to the next Bolgia. Malacoda and his fiends cannot leave the fifth Bolgia of the grafters. It is said in the Inferno:

"For the providence that gave them (the fiends) the fifth pit to govern as the ministers of its will takes from their souls the power of leaving it".

Malacoda also gives the reader the time by telling how long time it was since Bolgia Six passages collapsed;

And then to us: 'You can't continue farther
down this ridge, for the sixth arch
lies broken into pieces at the bottom.

"If you desire to continue on,
then make your way along this rocky ledge.
Nearby's another crag that yields a passage.

"Yesterday, at a time five hours from now,
it was a thousand two hundred sixty-six years
since the road down here was broken.

"I'm sending some men of mine along that way
to see if anyone is out to take the air.
Go with them -- they won't hurt you." (Inferno, Canto XXI, 106-117.)

Dante assumes that the crucifixion of Jesus took place in year 34, when a great earthshake came. It happened 12 o'clock am (midnight) according to the Gospel of Luke, which means that the time for Dante would be approximately 7 o'clock am in the Holy Saturday.

The last line of Canto 21 features Malacoda signalling to other demons by blowing a raspberry; another demon replies by producing a thunderous fart that Dante likens to a trombone («ed elli avea del cul fatto trombetta»).
