= Spawn (1999 video game) =

- Developer: Konami Computer Entertainment America
- Publisher: Konami of America
- Producer: Masahiro Ueno
- Programmers: Ken Kano; Masahiro Ueno; Paul Hellier
- Composers: Jun Funahashi; Kazuhiro Senoo
- Platform: Game Boy Color
- Release: NA: September 15, 1999
- Genre: Action-adventure
- Mode: Single-player

Spawn is a 1999 action-adventure game developed and published by Konami for the Game Boy Color, based on the Spawn comic book character. The game was noted for its extensive use of digitized speech in cutscenes, a largely uncommon feature in games for the system.

== Plot ==
Special agent Al Simmons is tricked by his military team and assassinated. After being sent to Hell, Simmons makes a deal with the demon, Malebolgia, to get revenge by leading Hell's army to, and on, Earth. However, the deal is twisted, and Simmons becomes a minion of Hell, stripped of his name and rank, and now referred to only as Spawn. Rather than accept this fate, Spawn searches for the opportunity to free himself from his misguided deal. This leads to the rebirth of Spawn (with Violator as well) as in the chapters of the comic books by Todd McFarlane. The story completely revolves around Spawn and the growth of his power.

== Gameplay ==
Spawn is an action-adventure platformer with some shooter elements. The player controls Spawn and must guide him through four stages of combat, navigating various environmental obstacles while defeating enemies, various thugs and occasional bosses. In each of the stages, Spawn must eliminate the enemies by punching, kicking, and using his weapons; a chain, which unleashes a powerful attack, a gun, and a machine gun. The player can find and collect items along the way, such as a "Spawn" symbol that restores a small amount of Spawn's health, a "G" symbol for gun ammunition, and an "M" symbol for machine gun ammunition. The game contains both horizontal and vertical stages, as well as a motorcycle chase stage.

There are three difficulty modes. In each mode, enemies can take more damage. One punch will knock out any minor enemy in easy mode and the player can start at any stage. It takes two punches in normal mode and the player must play through from stage one. On hard mode, it takes several punches, so the fighting becomes much more strategic. The player must beat the game on hard mode to get the real ending.

== Development ==
The game was programmed by Ken Kano, Masahiro Ueno, and Paul Hellier, and produced by Masahiro Ueno. The art and graphics were done by Jason Elliott, Dave Matthews, Matt Winalski, Don Alexander, and Justin Rasch. Sound designers Jun Funahashi and Kazuhiro Senoo composed the game's soundtrack. Voices were provided by J.S. Gilbert as Overt-Kill, Scott Keck as Spawn and The Redeemer, Doug Boyd as Billy Kincaid and The Freak, and Charles Martinet as Clown and The Curse, and Konami artists and staff members Caiphus Moore as Malebolgia, Diana Salles as Jessica Priest and Tiffany, Dave Matthews as Violator, Chris Thomas as Tremor, and Randall Hauser as Michaelangelo, Sentry and Fake Al Simmons.

== Reception ==
Reception

Aggregate score
Aggregator	Score
GameRankings	58%

Review scores
Publication	Score
AllGame	3/5
Game Informer	6.25/10
IGN	3/10
Nintendo Power	5.8/10

The game received "mixed" reviews, according to video game review aggregator GameRankings, who gave it a score of 58%. Nintendo Power scored the game a 5.8/10 in August, one month prior to its release. Brad Cook of AllGame gave it a rating of 3/5 stars. Andrew Reiner of Game Informer scored the game a 6.25/10, calling it "a decent game". He said that while it was not a great game, it did have some interesting features that make it entertaining, such as the digitized speech and the four stages' availability from the start of the game. Reiner called the action stages "as generic as they come" and criticized the character of Spawn as "really not coming across as a tough hellion. He kicks, punches, and occasionally shoots again. Basically, he's like a deformed Steven Seagal." Craig Harris of IGN gave the game a 3/10, stating, "I thought we left generic platform games to rest back in the NES days? Spawn proves that theory wrong. Apparently there are developers out there who lack any imagination for Game Boy Color game design, and they were thrown upon the Spawn project for Konami. Unless you're a die-hard Spawn fanatic, you should leave this title to rot on store shelves." Sword Chomp reviewed the game on September 10, 2021, stating, "I couldn't really recommend this game to anybody unless they were actively looking for bad games to play, which in that case I would offer up this title readily. The Game Boy Color was truly a great device and had a ton of great titles. Konami's Spawn was not one of them." Waseem Muhammad of Game Rant included the game in their "6 Best Spawn Games, Ranked" list, saying that despite its mixed reception upon release, there are a lot of players who "enjoy the portable experience that the game provides on the Game Boy Color", with the ability to control Spawn making the game slightly stand out from the other Spawn games.
