= Cogliostro =

Publication information
- Publisher: Image Comics
- First appearance: Spawn #9 (March 1993)
- Created by: Neil Gaiman; Todd McFarlane

In-story information
- Alter ego: Cain
- Species: Hellspawn
- Notable aliases: Nicholas Cogliostro, Cog, The Count, Vlad, Father Nicholas, Black Dark Hood, Abramelin/Merlin, Sinn
- Abilities: Immortality; Superhuman strength, speed, durability, senses and agility; Healing factor; Necroplasm (however, he is unable to use his power due to the fact that he only has one "tick" of necro-power left)

Cogliostro (/kɒɡliˈoʊstroʊ/ KOG-lee-OH-stroh), also simply Cog, is a character appearing in Todd McFarlane's Spawn comic book series published by Image Comics. Cogliostro was created in 1993 by author Neil Gaiman and artist Todd McFarlane and introduced in Spawn issue #9. Originally depicted as a supporting character, he becomes an antagonist as the series progresses, eventually becoming the supervillain Sinn, one of the main antagonists of the series. His true identity is Cain the first murderer and the first Hellspawn.

== Fictional character biography ==
=== Meeting Al Simmons ===
Cogliostro first appears as a homeless man, but he seems to know more about Spawn's situation than Spawn himself. Cog informs Spawn that his powers draw on a limited energy source, and that using it up will condemn him to eternal torment in Hell. He is the angel on Spawn's right shoulder, opposite to the Violator, who exhorts Spawn to revel in death and destruction not just in the name of Hell, but also for its own sake.

Eventually, Cogliostro reveals that he is also a former Hellspawn, having forsaken Malebolgia long ago, and refuses to use his remaining powers, as he has one "tick" of necroplasmic power left, and any use of his Hell-granted powers will end his Earthly existence. Still, that single bit of power has extended his lifespan to centuries, and he does not want the newest Spawn to fall to the darkness that created both of them.

=== Past as Cain ===
After an absence in the Spawn comics after #100, Cogliostro returned to Spawn and is revealed that he is dying and that he is terrified of Hell's status ever since Spawn abandoned the throne after defeating Malebolgia. After this, Spawn reveals to Cog his plan to turn Earth into a new paradise, a Utopia.

Spawn and Cog then travel to the deserts of Tunisia for permission from the Greenworld to transform Earth into Spawn's ideal world until he is attacked by the third Redeemer as an act of vengeance. After the battle, Spawn is abducted by a pair of giant scorpions as they drag him to Hell, where he is being awaited by demons.

Still in Tunisia, Cog is visited by Mammon, who gives him a mysterious box which Cog seems to recognize. Cog commits suicide in order to help Spawn down in Hell.

Redeemer, now aware of what he did wrong, travels to Hell to help Spawn battle the demons whose ideas were to battle for the throne of Hell. After a frustrating battle against Violator, Spawn summons all the past Hellspawn before him to help him with the other demons and takes back the throne of Hell.

Cog then runs to Spawn with the mysterious box given to him and tells Spawn that this is what he needs to help him turn Earth into a paradise. Spawn opens the box which turns Hell into an Eden-like world and sees his widow, Wanda, and runs to her, only to be caught in a trap laid by Cog.

It is revealed that Cogliostro was born as Cain, the first murderer; since the beginning, he wanted to rule Hell rather than serve it. It was now clear that the only reason Cogliostro helped Spawn was to enable him to gain the throne of Hell, making him the new ruler.

After this act of betrayal, Cog decided to give Spawn "what he always wanted" and sent him to Earth back as Al Simmons without the Hellspawn symbiote attached to him. Cain has not been seen since but has been briefly mentioned, such as his plans of building a tower in Hell to pierce Heaven.

=== Recent activity ===
The Redeemer tells Nyx while in Hell that the demons say that Cog has locked himself away in the Black Tower and given control over the 8th Sphere to the greater demons. It is later revealed that he was hard at work building the tower higher and higher so that it can reach Heaven. Once the tower penetrates into the realm of Heaven, the forces of Hell will be free to invade Heaven's gates directly. However, later issues dropped this, as instead Cogliostro acts as a mentor and ally towards Jim Downing and seems to have become allies with Simmons again, which retcons his betrayal until #297, which reveals that his betrayal is still canon but he has given up on the throne. He would later murder Nyx and try to recruit Gunslinger Spawn to his cause, but he was killed by him in 309. He would later return in Spawn's universe one-shot, where he becomes Sinn.

== Legal rights ==
Cogliostro and Medieval Spawn are co-owned by Neil Gaiman and Todd McFarlane.

In 1993 McFarlane contracted Neil Gaiman (as well as other recognized authors like Frank Miller and Dave Sim) to write one issue of his Spawn series. While doing so, Gaiman introduced the characters Cogliostro, Angela and Medieval Spawn. All three characters were based on characters created by Todd McFarlane and were co-created with Todd McFarlane who designed them. These all continued to be featured in the series after Gaiman's involvement and had many tie-ins with McFarlane's toy company. Cogliostro had a prominent role in the live-action movie in 1997.

McFarlane had initially agreed that Gaiman retained co-creator rights on the characters. However, he later claimed that Gaiman's work had been work-for-hire and that McFarlane owned all of Gaiman's creations entirely, pointing to the legal indicia in Spawn #9 and the lack of legal contract stating otherwise. McFarlane had also refused to pay Gaiman for the volumes of Gaiman's work he republished and kept in print. In 2002, Gaiman filed suit and won a sizeable judgment against McFarlane and Image Comics and the rights due any creator. All three characters became co-owned 50/50 by both men.

Angela was later sold to Marvel Comics whereas Cogliostro and Medieval Spawn are still used in the Spawn comics.

== In other media ==
=== Television ===
- The late Richard Dysart provided his voice in the animated series, where he has a very different background than in the comics, becoming more like the character of Lord Covenant from the comics. Cogliostro was a knight during the age of chivalry, becoming a hellspawn known as the Black Knight. Ultimately, however, he found his servitude to Malebolgia to be in violation of his honor; leading him to take up black magic to free himself, thereby becoming Merlin of the Arthurian legend. From then on, he sought to save at least one hellspawn in order to redeem himself, a goal he seems to be approaching towards the end of Spawn 3: The Ultimate Battle, with Al Simmons pledging himself to his teachings.

=== Film ===
- The late Nicol Williamson portrayed Cogliostro in the 1997 film adaptation, where he was the black knight (Sir John of York) from the fifteenth century who became a Hellspawn after his death; but at some point successfully freed his soul from the demons' control and now fights on the side of Heaven. He becomes Al's teacher and instructs him in how to use his necroplasm armor. This version lacks his symbiotic armor, but appears to possess some supernatural abilities, such as a sharp blade that automatically extends from his right arm.

=== Video games ===
- Cogliostro is a playable character in the video game Spawn: In the Demon's Hand voiced by Phillip Sheperd.
