= List of Spawn characters =

The comic book series Spawn, published by Image Comics, contains a variety of characters: the allies of the protagonist and his antagonists. Some of them went on to have spin-offs or debuted from spin-offs.

Spawn, the main character of the series, is a CIA operative who was sent to hell, later protecting humanity from the war between heaven and hell.

== Characters ==
=== Supporting characters ===
Character	Role
Wanda Blake	Al Simmons's widow; named after the wife of Spawn creator Todd McFarlane. Was killed by Violator in Spawn: Resurrection.
Terry Fitzgerald	Wanda's husband, based on a friend of Spawn creator Todd McFarlane. He was Al's best friend in life and later gets possessed by Plague Spawn, dying in the process.
Cyan Fitzgerald / Misery	Wanda Blake and Terry Fitzgerald's daughter gains superpowers as a teenager and becomes Misery, named after Todd McFarlane's daughter.
Sam Burke	New York City Police Department (NYPD) detective, Twitch Williams's partner.
Twitch Williams	Fully known as "Maximilian Steven Percival 'Twitch' Williams III", Sam Burke's partner.
Man of Miracles	Offers guidance to Spawn, taking shape into several humans, including Jesus Christ.
Medieval Spawn / Sir John of York	Medieval-era Hellspawn was previously a knight named Sir John of York, returning several hundred years in the future to do good deeds.
Haunt / Daniel (and Kurt) Kilgore	The protagonist of the series of the same name; he appears as a supporting character in Spawn.
Nyx (Carrie Andrews) / first She-Spawn / Scion / Queen of Hell	Witch who helps Al Simmons regain his Hellspawn powers, later betraying Al to save someone else's soul. In an interview with Spawn writer David Hine, it was revealed that Nyx is in love with Spawn. Spawn eventually persuaded Nyx (the original She-Spawn) to become Queen of Hell after Satan's death. She would become more villainous since taking over Hell's throne. She is also the protagonist of her own spin-off series, Black Ritual: The Book of Nyx.
Jessica Priest / second She-Spawn	Former CIA agent, Al Simmons' killer, second She-Spawn, and the leader of the Scorched.
The Scorched	A Hellspawn team, humans, and angels led by Jessica Priest.
Angela	Angelic bounty-hunter. Sent against Spawn, she later befriended him. She was impaled with her own dual-bladed staff by Malebolgia, later having his head cut off.
James "Jim" Downing	The main protagonist in issues 185–250; a scientist. Became Spawn until issue 250, returning to his former body in issue 292 and becoming an agent of the Greenworld.
Mike the Messenger	The Archangel Michael, assisting Simmons under God's orders.
Jake Fitzgerald (God)	One of Wanda and Terry's miracle twins; a reincarnation of God, a former villain who is the brother of Satan.
Granny / Mary Blake	Wanda Blake's grandmother.
Eddie Frank	A young man, former host of the Redeemer and later becomes the Reaper.
Andy Frank	Eddie Frank's younger brother.
K7-Leetha	Spawn's shape-shifting costume; a neural parasite from the fourth circle of Hell.
Christopher Welland	Boy whose soul is sealed within Spawn's heart; a young Hellspawn that uses his powers to help Spawn.
Hiroshi Kitamura	One of the lost souls within Spawn.
Kumiko Kitamura	The granddaughter of Hiroshi and one of the lost souls.
Marc Simmons	Spawn's brother, an FBI profiler and field agent.
Marc Rosen	A journalist and a friend of Jim Downing and Sara Johnston. He later becomes the host for Medieval Spawn.
Susan Matthews	Marc Rosen's girlfriend.
Sara Johnston	Nurse who becomes Jim Downing's lover.
Richard Simmons	Spawn's brother; a minister who was a former drug user.
Bobby	Homeless man and Al's best friend; later becomes an alcoholic.
Bootsy	Homeless man who is an undercover angel; he makes reports to heaven about Al.
Gunslinger Spawn / Jeremy Winston	Hellspawn cowboy from the old west.
Callindra	A young 200-year-old angel, defending Angela from charges of treason.
Anahita and Kuan Yin	Two angels. They defend Angela by bringing Spawn to testify on her behalf. Both were once freelance employees of Angela.
Jade (Lisa Wu)	News reporter investigating the alley murders at Rat City; a bounty hunter sent by the heavens to kill evil creatures.
Max Williams	Twitch Williams's son.
Earl	An ally of Spawn whom he met at the gym.
Helen Williams	Wife of Twitch Williams.
Dr. K. C. McRory	Also known as "Dr. Death", in charge of the crime scene investigation department; he was later killed in an accident.
Major Forsberg	A mentally ill veteran. He is trapped in an asylum. When Spawn contacts him for information, Forsberg gives him insight into Jason Wynn's projects. He later returns when he begs Spawn to kill him.
Kenji Onozaka	A Japanese man who is friends with Al Simmons and Terry Fitzgerald. He has a wife and two children, who are part of Cyan's host family. He is killed by demons.
Matsuko Onozaka	Kenji Onokaza's wife, and mother of Yoko and Yujiro. Along with the rest of her family, she is killed by demons.
Yoko Onozaka	Daughter of Kenji and Matsuko, and sister of Yujiro. After she is killed by demons, she appears as a ghost to help Cyan defeat the demons.
Yujiro Onozaka	Brother of Yoko, and son of Kenji and Matsuko.
Ghost Girl	Ghost of a young woman killed by demons. She helps Cyan and Spawn kill the demons who were responsible for her death.
Sadaharu	Ghost of a young boy killed by demons. He plays a similar role in fighting demons as Ghost Girl.
Saya	A young woman assaulted by demons. Spawn saves her.
Phil Timpler	Restaurant worker. Until he dies, he is used for some time as the second Redeemer. He returns in issue 372.
Raptor	First appearing in issue 306, he fought to survive with his lover Claudiaz.
Claudiaz	First appearing in issue 306, she was a survivor of a dark timeline alongside her lover Raptor.
Craig Rowans	A private detective who was assigned to assist Sam and Twitch. He met Jim Downing as well as Sara Johnston, and Marc Rosen.
Simon	The ghost of a boy who died during the events of King Spawn was brought by the oracle to be tutored by Heap.
Amy Winston	Gunslinger's younger sister.
Alex	A young boy who bonded with Komox.
Komox	A powerful entity who protects Alex.
Taylor Bartlett	A young man who is Gunsling's ally.
Natasha Gorky	A young woman who was protected by the Scorched.
Odessa Turgnev	A friend of Natasha Gorky.
Soul Crusher 2 / Sergei Medvedev	A childhood friend of Natasha Gorky who was raised by the original Soul Crusher before Sergei killed him. He is now a member of the Scorched team.
Shaman Waya	An old friend of Gunslinger from the Old West who stays alive for centuries due to his magic.
Focus	A young man who was experimented on and gained super speed.
Jessica Tokwell	The female news reporter.
Monolith	An alien hulking red Hellspawn.
Korvox	An agent of the Greenworld.
Dark Ages Spawn / Lord Iain Covenant	A noble knight who was forced to become a Hellspawn.
Peter Cairn	The Spawn of the future and protagonist of the Rat City series.
Lyra	A hybrid angel who tries to take down Bludd.
Greenworld	A living, sentient planet where nature is sacred. He is ruled by Gaia.
Gaia	Ruler of the Greenworld.
Gloriana	An angel and former lover of Baziel who becomes the Violator.
Daniel Llanso	The Spawn of the post-apocalyptic future and protagonist of the first four issues of the Curse of the Spawn series and the one-shot Spawn: Blood and Salvation; he later returned in issue 361 as a supporting character.
Bulletproof	Debuting in issue 361, he is a superpowered being who teams up with Tremor, Mandarin Spawn, and Daniel Llanso against the coming war between Heaven and Hell.
Sherlee Johnson	Debuting in issue 5, she was Billy Kincaid's last victim; she later appeared as the protagonist of her own series, The Curse of Sherlee Johnson.
The Stranger	A mysterious swordsman who lost his friends and family, he is trapped in Hell where he teams up with Sherlee Johnson.
Poacher	Debuting in Curse of the Spawn issue 15, he is a humanoid elephant-like creature who was once friends with Abidil against Malebolgia; he later returned in issue 365 to help Spawn and allies against the war between Heaven and Hell.
Kizzy Dewitt	Peter Cairn’s love from high school.
Vox	An ancient Hellspawn who walked away from Malebolgia.
Devil's Spawn / Erlking Ulegrave	An ancient, powerful, and mysterious figure who is the master of the Wild Hunt.
Hudson Hill	A young boy with psychic powers.
Sia Sesanga	A news reporter trying to find Spawn.
Miles Cereni	A young man who lost his brother in supernatural crossfire with Spawn.

=== Villains ===
Character	Role
Malebolgia	The original main antagonist, former master of the eighth circle of hell. Decapitated by Spawn. Exists as a ghost possessing the Freak's necroplasmic body. He is later revived by Sinn in issue 372.
Jason Wynn / Disruptor	Former CIA director and Al Simmons' superior who gave the order to kill Simmons. He was one of the most powerful men on the planet, later returning as the supervillain Disruptor.
Violator / Clown / Baziel	One of the main antagonists in the series, appearing as a Constant tormentor and the arch-nemesis of Spawn, pushing him to use his powers for the benefit of Hell. One of the five Phlebiac Brothers, demons from the eighth circle of Hell; the Violator: Origin miniseries revealed he was actually an angel as Baziel before becoming Violator.
The Redeemer (originally known as Anti-Spawn)	The holy opposite of the Hellspawn, created by the Star Chamber. There have been three Redeemers: Jason Wynn was the first, Phil Timper the second, and Eddie Frank the third and current Redeemer a.k.a. the Reaper. Phil Timper makes a surprise return in issue 372, still using the Anti-Spawn name.
Mammon	A Forgotten One. One of the major Lords of Hell.
Katie Fitzgerald (Satan)	Overarching antagonist; revealed in issue 158 that she was actually Satan; killed by Spawn.
Cogliostro / Sinn / Cain	Spawn's former mentor and guide; former master of the eighth circle of Hell, in which he later serves as his mentor again and then a villain. He would soon become Sinn. He is the newest incarnation of Cain.
Brock Fennel	The third newscaster from the first issue. He was eventually revealed to be a demon in disguise.
Nicholas Rocca (Overt-Kill or Overtkill)	Seemingly unstoppable cyborg who fought Spawn to a standstill early in his career, later defeated by a simple systems malfunction. Each time he is dismantled, he becomes more powerful.
Tiffany	Warrior-Angel who replaced Angela in the hunt for Spawn; member of an Angelic host known as the Amazon Warriors.
Joe Frank	Father of Eddie Frank and Andy Frank, who abuses them until Eddie kills him; he later returned in The Scorched issue 40 as a vengeful revenant from Hell.
Billy Kincaid (Note: /kɪnˈkeɪd/)	Pedophilic child-killer who was in turn killed by Spawn; served as a lackey of Malebolgia and has returned from hell.
Bludd	A vampire in league with Clown.
Margaret Love / Nadia Vladoiva	"Philanthropist" who Simmons once knew as Soviet agent Nadia Vladova, known for making deadly mind control experiments.
The Freak / Bryan Kulizczi	Escapee from a mental asylum with multiple personalities. He was killed by his own evil and sent to hell. Later returns in issue 289, where he is alive.
Simon Pure	Last leader of The Kingdom, a vampire cult that believed they were descendants of the Twelve Apostles.
Zera	Queen of the Seraphim.
Lilly	First introduced in the animated series Todd McFarlane's Spawn as a teenage girl arriving at a bus stop. Was a vampire sent by the heavens to kill the Hellspawn. Later killed by Spawn using sunlight.
Ab and Zab	Also known as Abbadon and Zabraxas, minor demons that are servants to the Lord of Hell.
Bingo	One of the recent Spawn villains and servants of Satan.
Hellion	A servant of Satan tasked with capturing Wanda Blake.
Belial	Demon from Hell.
Major Vale	Corrupt general.
John Sansker	Vampire monster.
Metatron	An angel that fought Spawn.
Katherne	An angel.
Grace	An angel from the comics.
Soul Crusher	A mysterious, scarred figure.
Decay	A superhuman creature.
King Spider	A villain that Spawn and Malcom Dragon fought.
Gabrielle	A corrupt angel from Heaven who was sent to eliminate Spawn.
Celestine	An angel sent to kill Violator.
Godsend	An angel who is a member of the Heaven equivalent of the Four Horsemen of the Apocalypse.
Vindicator	Most expository of the Phlebiac Brothers, guided Billy Kincaid through Hell.
Vandalizer	Most compact of the Phlebiac Brothers.
Vaciliator	Most indecisive of the Phlebiac Brothers.
Vaporizer	The largest of the Phlebiac Brothers.
The Forgotten Ones	Angelic creatures who did not choose sides in the Biblical Fall, and were banished by God.
Chapel / Bruce Stinson	A mercenary, an assassin, a former CIA agent, and a member of Youngblood.
Antonio Twistelli	Also known as Tony Twist, the infamous mafia don of New York City.
Tremor / Richard Masullo	Predecessor of Overt-Kill; failed prototype for the Mafia Supersoldier that turned him into a cybernetic monster.
The Curse / Phillip Krahn	An eccentric billionaire and religious zealot who is one of Spawn's deadliest enemies.
Cy-Gor / Michael Konieczni	Cybernetic mesh of metal and ape, but with a human brain. This government project knows no control nor pleasure except for the taste of blood.
Urizen	The Dark God, Leveler of Hope and Destroyer of Dreams. He is based on the evil deity from William Blake's mythos.
The Heap / Eddie Beckett	He was murdered after finding a bag of necroplasm and becomes Heap, an agent of Greenworld.
Rafael	Current highest-ranking Angel on Earth, taking over as Gabrielle, is called to answer for her failed scheme.
The Disciple	Heaven's greatest warrior and predecessor to the Redeemer.
Thamuz	Demonic Master of Torture who has vowed to unravel the secrets kept by Spawn.
Admonisher	Mercenary hired by Tony Twist to kill Violator.
Scott McMillian	Corrupt senator and father of Billy Kincaid.
Chief Banks / Louis Banks	Corrupt police chief.
Merrick	From the animated series Todd McFarlane's Spawn; a soldier of Jason Wynn.
Hellspawn	Former human turned demon in the service of Hell.
Mark	Human turned demon called Mark of the Beast.
Gabriel	Corrupt angel.
Morana	Woman who was Wanda and Al's daughter, but was retconned.
Victoria	Angel who fought Jim Downing and was the Redeemer's wife; she turned into a vampire, later being saved by the Redeemer.
Hel	Former ruler in Hell who teamed up with Violator and possessed the corpse of Susan Williams for a while.
Solomon Pure	Potential brother of Simon Pure and an associate of Bludd.
Phlegethonyarre	Demon that debuted in the first four issues of the Curse of the Spawn series as the main antagonist.
Brimstone	Demon from the video game Spawn: In the Demon's Hand.
Domina	Angel who guarded the gate to Urizen.
The Demon Croatoan / Simon Vesper	Demon looking for his own place in Hell.
Suture / Gretchen Culver	Woman who was killed and reborn as an undead vengeful killer.
Wolfram	Undead walker who loosely follows orders.
The Kingdom	Group of vampires led by Simon Pure.
Dawn	A teenage girl who is a vampire and a member of the Kingdom; she had a relationship with Max Williams.
Lucas	Friend of Dawn's and a member of the Kingdom.
The Rapture	Group of elite angel warriors who are the equivalent of the Four Horsemen of the Apocalypse.
Red-Sleeves	Demon who came from Japan who attacks Cyan and Spawn.
Shimazu	Demon from Japan who attacks Cyan and Spawn.
Tamura	Demon in the form of a human in Japan.
Ricky	Demon who takes the form of a crow as well as a female human being.
Honolulu Jo	Demon who was a part of the Yakuza.
Okumatsu	Angel who resides in Japan.
Urshrek	The Winter King and an evil god.
Mad One	Fallen angel featured in the SNES game; kidnapped the souls of thirteen children, including Cyan, and fused them into an Orb of Light that can destroy Malebolgia.
The Heart of the Heavens	Large angelic warrior first appearing in issue 306, hunting down Raptor and Claudiaz.
Extractor	Villain during Downing's time as Spawn; superpower bounty hunter.
Malcolm	Cyber mercenary who was encased by Jason Wynn.
Chretien DuSang De La Croix	One of the villains in Spawn: The Dark Age.
Guy Dublanc	Villain in the Spawn: The Dark Ages series.
Sisters of the Morrigan	Three female villains who worship the Morrigan from Spawn: The Dark Ages.
Reaver	Rogue angel from the video game Spawn: Armageddon.
Dakota	Female villain with the ability to control dinosaurs.
Jerchio	Undead villain who works with Disruptor.
The New Breed	Monstrous demon and final boss in the SNES video game; created by Malebolgia using the kidnapped souls of Cyan and twelve other children.
The Forsaken / Abel	New villain who appears to be a darker version of the Redeemer, later revealed to be the first of the Redeemers and Abel, the brother of Cain.
Cordelia	Woman with a collection of monsters; revealed to be a demon.
The Oracle	Witch who came from Greenworld; debuted in the King Spawn series.
Black Azazel	Fallen angel who is part of Psalm 177.
Sin Devourer	A villain from the Scorched series, a type of machine that uses the Anti-Spawn and Hellspawn serum to function.
Carnivore	Werewolf who fights against Gunslinger Spawn.
Theus	Dark Angel who appears as a recurring foe for Gunslinger—Spawn, being the main antagonist of the spin-off series.
Cyrus	Immortal man who was once allied with Theus.
Radcliff Winterstone	A person who has a grudge against Gunslinger for killing his family.
Omega Spawn / Omega the Conqueror	Hulking Hellspawn who went to conquer the galaxy.
Plague Spawn	Prototype for future Hellspawns; later resurfaces and terrorizes the world. He possessed Terry Fitzgerald, granting him sentience, but also killed Terry in the process.
Ordeal	Member of the Court of Priests and servant of the Nightmare Spawn.
Nightmare Spawn	Winged Hellspawn who appeared in the Hellspawn series before making his full debut in the King Spawn series.
Raven Spawn / Kray-Von Gore	Hellspawn who controls ravens and creator of K7-Leetha symbiotic suit; he first appeared in the Hellspawn series before debuting in the King Spawn series.
Nerco Cop	Artificial Hellspawn that debuted in Spawn: Simony; made from Al's cape.
Nordik	Norse Hellspawn that debuted in the Spawn: Fan Edition miniseries; he reappeared in Violator: Origin issue 2 as an enemy of Violator.
Luciano Bartino	Member of the mafia and the one who made Overtkill.
Court of Priests	Group of cultists made up of Spawn recurring rogues.
The Agent	Also known as Inspector Skies.
Saboteur	New villain who appeared as the leader of the renegade angels.
Behemoth	Large and powerful demon in the King Spawn series.
The Offering	Angel at war with Brimstone.
Mandarin Spawn / Chenglei	Former abused deformed citizen from Ancient China; later becoming the Mandarin Spawn.
Barbatos	Demord who once served Cog before he left.
Sandalphon	A fallen angel trapped in the void.
Titus	Large angel leading a team attacking Gunslinger.
McCarver	A man who experimented on Gunslinger.
Exodus Corporation	Large corporation responsible for Jason Wynn becoming Disruptor.
Mr. Merrival	Member of Exodus Corporation obsessed with cutting people's brains.
Sandra	Merrival's assistant.
Bateman Merrival	Merrival's son.
Tar Merrival	Merrival's daughter.
Planet Eaters	A race of giant aliens created by Gaia to destroy planets they judge unworthy.
Terminus	A member of the Planet Eaters.
Cataclysm	The new ruler of Hell.
Rapture	The new leader of Heaven.
Cadiclus	Sinn's right hand.
Frank Bishop	A former CIA assassin and associate of Jessica Priest and Al Simmons until he was killed by the former. He was revived by the demons, becoming an agent of Hell.
Viscerator	The sister of Violator. She is one of Medieval Spawn's foes and the main antagonist of The Scorched series.
Sophia Swan	A vigilante nurse who fused with her last victim's ghost, becoming a female Haunt.
Victor Neekay	The head of PTS and the main antagonist of Rat City.
Lucifer	The fallen angel who appears in the Violator: Origin miniseries as Violator's former master and main antagonist.
Bloodletter / Tasha Thronwell	She was a mystical mercenary who worked for the CIA until Al exposed her and she went into hiding for ten years. Now, she seeks revenge on Al, who now goes by Spawn.
The Puritan	A witch hunter who debuted in the Black Ritual: The Book of Nyx miniseries as an antagonist.
Beliafon	The Dark Necromancer who revived Sherlee Johnson.
Crimson Seraph	A humanoid red angel with multiple eyes.
Arif Ormet	A computer science major seeking revenge on Peter Cairn whom he blames for the death of his brother.
Louis Becker	A former squad member of Peter Cairn who died and serves Viscerator in Hell as a demon.
Casper	An angel whom Tasha befriended during her quest to kill Spawn, only for the angel to betray her and become her worst enemy.
Progeny	The offspring of Malebolgia; they were introduced in Rat City.
Commander Belgic	An alien warlord who leads his own army, and a Hellspawn himself.
Stick Candy	A demon who hires She-Spawn to save a boy from a doomsday cult.
Deacon Forrester	The leader of a cult of angels.
The 400	A cabal of angels, demons, vampires, and alien entities.
Bonehead	A large monster serving as a member of the 400.
Achile Costa	A member of the 400 serving as a handler.
Maddelena	The leader of a group of witches fighting Nyx.
Mr. Jones	A member of the 400 who is the owner of a butcher shop and has a malicious side.
The Cleric	A member of the 400 who has Marc Simmons's severed head, which is still alive.
The Prince of Cats	A crimelord who takes an interest in the Scorched.
