= Jessica Priest =

Fictional character from the Spawn universe

- Jessica Priest

Publication information
- Publisher: Image Comics
- First appearance: Spawn (1997 film)
- First comic appearance: Spawn #61 (May 1997)
- Created by: Todd McFarlane; Greg Capullo

In-story information
- Alter ego: She-Spawn
- Species: Human/Hellspawn
- Team affiliations: The Scorched
- Partnerships: Jason Wynn, Spawn
- Notable aliases: She-Spawn
- Abilities: Expert assassin

Jessica Priest is a character from the Spawn universe. Created for the 1997 film Spawn as a gender-swapped adaptation of Chapel, Al Simmons's killer in the comic book, Priest was played by Melinda Clarke in the film, before being adapted to Spawn comics as a separate character from Chapel. She would later become the second She-Spawn (after Nyx) and the leader of the team called the Scorched.

== Publication history ==
The character of Chapel (originally from the comic book series Youngblood) could not be used in the Spawn movie because the rights to the character were owned by Rob Liefeld. McFarlane created Priest as a replacement for Chapel in the film and later had Priest retconned to be Spawn's killer in the comic as well. Some of her background is revealed in Curse of the Spawn #12–14.

She made her return in Spawn #300 (September 2019), where she becomes She-Spawn and becomes one of the main characters of The Scorched.

== Fictional history ==
Jessica Priest works as an assassin for Spawn's nemesis Jason Wynn. Prior to shooting Simmons, she searches South America for a biogenetic weapon for her boss. She later appears in the Curse of Spawn series where she is revealed to have a husband and two stepchildren. She later returns in #298 where she is seen talking to Nyx about Al Simmons and the forces of Hell trying to hunt down. Later on she would become a hellspawn herself.

== In other media ==
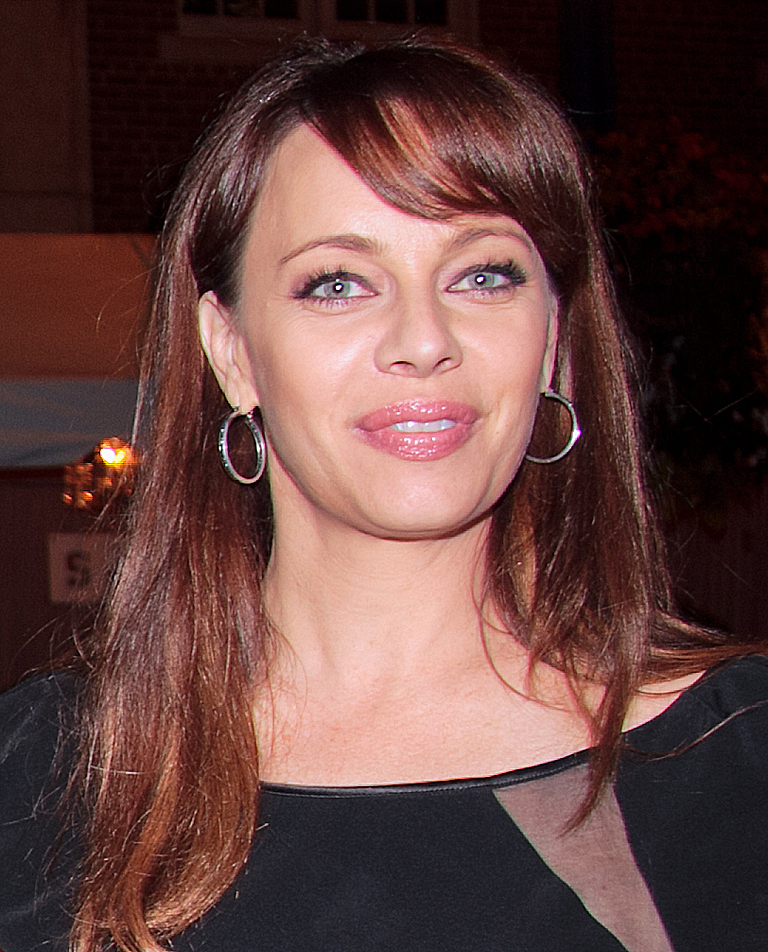
Melinda Clarke

- Priest was portrayed by Melinda Clarke in the 1997 film adaptation Spawn. She was intended to return as another Spawn in a sequel; but the film had neither the time nor the budget so it was canceled, with this storyline being incorporated into the character's adaptation to comic books.
- In the HBO animated series Todd McFarlane's Spawn (1997–1999), Chapel (voiced by Ruben Santiago-Hudson) is given the full name "Jess Chapel" in reference to Priest, serving as a composite character of the two characters, in Priest having been created to replace Chapel in-film.
- Priest appears in the 1999 video game Spawn, voiced by Diana Salles.
- Priest appears in the video game Spawn: In the Demon's Hand, voiced by Erin McMurphy.
- McFarlane Toys has made several action figures of Priest.
