= Zera (character) =

Spawn universe fictional character

- Zera, Queen of the Seraphim

Publication information
- Publisher: Image Comics
- First appearance: Spawn #154 (March 2006)
- Created by: David Hine; Philip Tan

In-story information
- Alter ego: Zera
- Team affiliations: Heaven
- Abilities: Superhuman strength and agility, can travel through space at will, Immortality

Zera is a supervillain appearing in the Spawn comic book series.

== Fictional character biography ==
As a conflict erupts in Heaven that may well be the final war between Heaven and Hell, it is revealed that God has an abandoned creation. The forces of the Forgotten gather at the gates of Paradise, and the Angels know that soon the walls will be breached. One of the ruling Seraphim sees no alternative and releases a long-forgotten warrior from imprisonment in the hope of turning the tide. A warrior of immense power, imprisoned by God himself, she is known as Zera.

Zera is the Queen of the Seraphim, one of the most powerful beings in all creation. Because she is utterly insane and has an endless blood lust, God chose to lock her away in the depths of the Shining City. In these desperate times, Zera has been set free to defend the Throne of Creation.

Free to enter the fray once more, she is seen single-handedly annihilating the armies of the Forgotten Ones. During battle, Zera's insanity and blood lust manifest themselves in the form of an enormous, white-furred bestial Humanoid. This Avatar is capable of breathing white celestial fire and obeys Zera's every command.

After defeating the Forgotten, Zera looks at the last and mocks him. He claims that there is still one more of the Forgotten, and while Zera shakes him to try to get the name, she snaps his neck. He never finishes the word, "Ma..." which would give her the name she desires, that of Lord Mammon, the architect behind the siege on Heaven. Knowing that Hell could break through the gates of Heaven at any moment and that Heaven's forces have been seriously depleted and are no match for evil, Zera heads out to find God and return him to his throne. Keyed into the essence of God, she tracks him down and finds him in the human form of Jacob Fitzgerald. At first, he doesn't remember who he is. With Zera's revelation, his memories return, and the two depart for Heaven. With his return, the Rapture begins. Later on, he is found by a now God-like Spawn after easily killing off many of Hell's forces during the Apocalypse.

Though she was one of the most powerful forces in Heaven and powerful enough to completely bisect Spawn, Zera was unable to match the power of a Deity that Spawn had acquired. When Spawn decided to stop holding back, he easily killed Zera's avatar and defeated Zera by ripping out all of her organs. Though defeated, Zera swore that she would be back and she would never stop trying to kill Spawn. Spawn decapitated her and brought the head in front of God himself, to whom she apologized for her failure.

She reappeared once more in Spawn #169. In this issue, she is seen again now as a rotting severed head immersed in preservative liquids within a glass container. Because God loved her above all others, she had been granted immortality and so is unable to die, even though she no longer has the rest of her body. She attempts to possess Nyx, but Spawn interferes after being summoned by the Voodoo priestess Mambo Suzanne. Zera uses Nyx's body to successfully do battle with Spawn. Mambo Suzanne, however uses the conflict as a distraction to shatter the glass containing Zera's head and throw the head to the streets below. There, demon dogs devour the head until there is nothing left, thereby freeing Nyx from Zera's possession. However, due to Zera's immortality, she cannot die. But how she will continue to exist without a body is left unexplained.

Zera returned in the King Spawn series as one of the villains serving under Black Azazel, before being killed again by Spawn.

== Other media ==
To commemorate the 14th anniversary of the comic, McFarlane Toys released a Zera action figure in its 29th Spawn line of toys.

== See also ==
- List of Spawn characters
