= Man of Miracles (comics) =

Publication information
- Publisher: Image Comics
- First appearance: Spawn #75 (August 1998)
- Created by: Todd McFarlane; Brian Holguin; Greg Capullo; Dwayne Turner

In-story information
- Alter ego: Mother of Existence
- Team affiliations: Greenworld
- Notable aliases: MOM, The Mother, The Father, Jesus Christ, Krishna, Buddha, Kali, Shiva, Sir Lancelot, The Mother Earth, Gaia, Mother Gazer, The Keeper
- Abilities: Immortality; Omniscience; Omnipotence; Omnipresence

The Man of Miracles (also known as Mother of Existence or M.O.M. for short) is a fictional androgynous being featured in the Spawn comic book series.

== Creation ==
Spawn creator Todd McFarlane purchased the assets of the defunct Eclipse Comics at a 1996 liquidation auction, believing it included the rights to the character Miracleman. Miracleman writer Neil Gaiman began legal action while McFarlane remained sure he owned the character, and produced Miracleman merchandise. A reimagined Mike Moran, now a principled journalist at the New York Daily Times, was added to the supporting cast of Hellspawn, a dark spin-off title of Spawn, in February 2001. Artist Ashley Wood released teaser images of Miracleman ahead of his planned debut in Hellspawn #12. However, Wood left the book after Hellspawn #11 and the storyline was abandoned when Gaiman sued McFarlane in 2002.

In-universe, the appearances were subsequently ascribed to the character Man of Miracles, whose aspect is shaped by the perceptions of others. The two characters of the pre-existing Mother of Existence and Man of Miracles were then combined into one. According to a retcon, they were supposed to always have been the same being. Due to Resurrection and #250 the character and the arcs that feature him were retconned from the series. Spawn #297 confirmed that Man of Miracles still exists. In the King Spawn series Man of Miracles is retconned into being simply Gaia.

== Fictional character biography ==
The Mother (under the alias Man of Miracles) has appeared to offer their guidance and wisdom to The Hellspawn so that he might play his part in Armageddon. They are an ageless being of practically inconceivable power who has been the architect behind most of the events in the Spawn universe, holding significant knowledge of Al Simmons and his role as Spawn, knowledge that not even Mammon possesses and possessing powers beyond that of God or Satan. Their true form is as the "Mother" of Existence, though they are neither female nor male, it is able to cast an illusion to make them look male.

It is revealed that Mother/Man of Miracles is in fact the one who walked among mortals as "Jesus Christ," and thus was actually independent of God in the Spawn universe. The twelve heavenly warriors known as the Disciples, formed from the souls of the Twelve Apostles, actually follow Man of Miracles above God.

Mother gave each of their infinite children a world to run as they wish; God and Satan were both given Earth. God and Satan constantly bickered and fought to the point where they declared war on one another. Mankind, being created by God (from The Mother's energy) but given free will by Satan, became unique and Mother instantly fell in love with them and decided to act on their behalf, rather than let their children use them as cannon fodder. Mother stripped both of their children of their kingdoms and made them sleep in a forgotten corner of the universe. Mother then came to Earth as Jesus Christ, spreading a message of love and tolerance. This message being corrupted by mankind, Mother saw that Armageddon was inevitable. Giving mankind a chance to survive, Mother preserved all the souls that had died in the same hour as Al Simmons and placed them inside of Spawn. Spawn represents the potential of mankind and must prove that humanity is worth saving from God and Satan's feud. Mother brought back God and Satan as the human children of Terry and Wanda Fitzgerald in order to give them an appreciation for humanity and change their ways. This plan failed, as the twins simply became more insane than before and wreaked further chaos on Earth. They have since regained their memories, powers, and kingdoms and are bolstering their armies for the final push that will begin Armageddon.

Mother has also been revealed as being The Keeper of Greenworld, the voice of the Emerald Parliament and the one who originally summoned The Heap.

M.O.M.'s appearance changes depending upon who is perceiving them. They have appeared as an anime-inspired hero, as Miracleman, as a mysterious woman covered in ivy who was presumably Gaia, Jesus Christ and, in their true form, as the Mother of Creation: a Caucasian skinned woman. When cloaked in their illusion, people see them as they want to, and they subsequently explains that this is because reality is far more malleable than humanity believes. In their anime guise, M.O.M.'s appearance changes consistently from panel to panel. The tattoos on their face are different each time, the logo on their chest appears and reappears and sometimes their shirt disappears but their logo remains visible on their skin. As of Resurrection and issue #250 onwards, Man of Miracles was retconned out due to legal issues with the Abrahamic origins of God and Satan now take over with the character and the arcs that feature him were retconned out; however, Mother of Existence does make a cameo in issue #297 and In the King Spawn series Gaia appears with a new redesign.

== See also ==
- The One Above All, a similar entity in Marvel Comics
- The Presence, a similar entity in DC Comics
