= Phlebiac Brothers =

The Phlebiac Brothers

Publication information
- Publisher: Image Comics
- First appearance: Violator #1 (May 1994)
- Created by: Alan Moore; Bart Sears; Greg Capullo

In-story information
- Team affiliations: Hell
- Abilities: Super-strength, invulnerability, telepathy, regeneration, possession, shapeshifting

The Phlebiac Brothers are antagonists appearing in the Spawn comic book series.

== Background ==
Dubbed the "true denizens of Hell", the Phlebiac brothers are five powerful demonic beings, servants of Malebolgia. The Violator claims they were born of human mothers, but sired by a full-blooded demon from Hell, apparently for a project of John Dee; and that he, the eldest son, later killed their father. They each possess inhuman strength and invulnerability, as well as telepathic, regenerative, possessive, and shapeshifting abilities.

- Violator (also known as The Clown), the eldest of the brothers and the most prominently featured in the comics. He has blue-gray skin, a slender frame (in contrast to his more rotund figure as a clown), and large red compound eyes, with two horns protruding from the sides of his face, along with a single large horn on his back. He is initially sent to Earth by Malebolgia to train the newly reborn Al Simmons, but quickly comes to resent this role, as he considers himself to be superior to all Hellspawn and later to have designed the suits and powers for every hellspawn after the first. He acts as Spawn's archnemesis throughout the series.
- Vindicator, the second most featured in the comics. He has green-gray skin, slender frame, large red eyes with prominent eyebrows, and a large horn protruding from his back. He is a taskmaster who subjugates newly arrived souls in the Eighth Circle of Hell.
- Vandalizer, the most dominant of the brothers, he often takes a leadership role amongst the group. He has brown-gray skin, small yellow eyes, and is substantially more muscular than his other brothers, with two small horns protruding from the sides of his face, and a large horn on his back.
- Vaporizer, the largest of the brothers. Though not as muscle-bound as Vandalizer, he has a much larger frame than his other brothers. He has lavender-gray skin and a notably spider-like visage, with six green eyes (three on either side of his face) and intimidating maw. He has two large horns protruding from each side of his face, as well as two more on his back.
- Vacillator, the smallest and weakest of the brothers. He is very similar in appearance to Vindicator, the most notable differences being his diminutive size and pink, segmented eye. As his name would suggest, Vacillator can be extremely indecisive.

=== Other members ===
- Dakota, the daughter of Violator, debuting in Gunslinger Spawn #3
- Viscerator, the sister of Violator, debuting in Scorched 24 and becomes the Scorched's archenemy.

== Alternate versions ==
In an alternate future of the year 2015, the brothers are corrupt police officers and henchman of Spawn, who has become a murderous dictator.

== In other media ==
The Phlebiac Brothers appears in the video game Spawn: In the Demon's Hand as playable characters and as cameos in Spawn's ending in Mortal Kombat 11.
