= Curse of the Spawn =

Comic book series

- Cover of the first issue. Artwork by Dwayne Turner and Danny Miki.

Publication information
- Publisher: Image Comics
- Schedule: Monthly
- Format: Ongoing series
- Genre: Superhero
- Publication date: September 1996 – March 1999
- No. of issues: 29
- Main character(s): Daniel Llanso; Jessica Priest; Sam and Twitch; The Angel Abdiel; Angela; Hatchet a Zombie Spawn

Creative team
- Written by: Alan B. McElroy
- Penciller(s): Dwayne Turner, Clayton Crain
- Inker(s): Danny Miki, Chance Wolf, Jonathon Glapion
- Letterer: Tom Orzechowski
- Colorist: Todd Broeker

Collected editions
- The Best of Curse of the Spawn: ISBN 978-1582406169

Curse of the Spawn is a spin-off of the Spawn comic book. The comic book introduced other Hellspawn and characters into the Image Universe. It was published by Image Comics from September 1996 until March 1999 and has been collected into multiple trade paperbacks. There were 29 issues in all.

== Publication history ==
The creative team for issues #1–23 were:

- Story: Alan McElroy
- Covers: Dwayne Turner, Danny Miki, Todd Broeker
- Pencils: Dwayne Turner
- Inks: Danny Miki, Chance Wolf
- Colors: Todd Broeker
- Letters: Tom Orzechowski

The creative team for issues #24–29 were:

- Story: Alan McElroy
- Covers: Dwayne Turner, Chance Wolf, Todd Broeker
- Pencils: Clayton Crain
- Inks: Chance Wolf, Jonathon Glapion
- Colors: Todd Broeker
- Letters: Tom Orzechowski

== Plot ==
=== First story arc ===
The first four issues of the series focuses on Daniel Llanso. His story is set some 400 years in the future in an apocalyptic world some time after Armageddon where the demon Phlegethonyarre has his servant, Abaddon the Angel of the Bottomless Pit, and their Undead Army of Nightmares (Necro-Soldiers, Zombies powered by Hell's Darklight) dominate and hunt all humans.

Daniel's life was an abusive one for the young man: he killed his abusive/drunken father with a laser rifle in order to protect his mother and sister, Madrid. He consequently spends most of his teen years and a portion of his 20s in various prison facilities on the Moons of Mars and Earth. During his time behind bars, he falls in love with a female Public Defender named "Mrs. Noon," with whom he has a strong but short love, as she is apparently killed because of him for an unknown reason. Daniel's memories of his past are mostly filled with pain and anger, of being shocked with tazer-prods in prison or murdering a Crater-Gang thug by smashing the face-mask of his spacesuit with a rock. At some point Daniel Llanso escapes from a lunar prison in a stolen freighter, but as the story points out, the cargo on board was 'Fetid' or, more likely, booby-trapped. Daniel Llanso dies as his spaceship burns up in the Earth's atmosphere; his space suit melts and his flesh burns. He screams as his soul falls burning into the darkness of damnation ending deep within the Twelfth Level of Hell.

Having died and resurrected as a Hellspawn, Daniel is at first lost in a blur of treacherous memory and whispers to do evil deeds and use his energy to violent ends. The Hellspawn rises from the barren earth just in time to stop a large demon from killing his sister and her son Matthew. Daniel instantly recognizes her, but not his nephew. She then fires her energy rifle at the Hellspawn as Madrid and Matt escape. Spawn is left alone only to be 'found' by Abaddon who goads Spawn to kill the last humans on Earth. Spawn agrees.

The forces of evil, now gathered within Vatican City, are led by the "Anti-Pope", who summons a demon named Bune to attack a human stronghold, while Abaddon goads Spawn to kill human soldiers and become Hell's General. Daniel resists at every turn, remembering the promise he made the last time he saw his sister alive: to never give up on himself. Abaddon reveals to Spawn that the Anti-Pope has already sent Death to claim Madrid and Matt, Spawn removes his mask and sees what he has become in a pool of water. In a moment of anger, he is confronted by his master Phlegethonyarre who admits to Daniel that his fate was sealed from the beginning and using his new necro powers consumes a part of his soul. The hellspawn Daniel races against time to rescue Madrid and her son Matt from an army of 'Navkies'(undead children) under the command of Bune. Phlegethonyarre gloats to Abaddon that once Spawn kills Madrid & Matthew the REAL Game can begin.

The story arc during Curse of the Spawn ends on a cliffhanger. Daniel rescues his sister yet discovers that Matthew was kidnapped by Abaddon and taken to "The Tower". Spawn battles Bune and ultimately kills him with his own scythe. Spawn races to the top of the tower only to find Abaddon waiting, preparing Matthew for a demonic sacrifice. Abaddon gives Spawn the chance to 'save' Matt's soul by killing him so he'll go to heaven (though this is probably a lie); instead, Spawn talks to Matt and tells him to picture the place he most wants to be, teleporting Matt back to his mother, who flee while Spawn confronts Abaddon. Spawn and Abaddon battle and Spawn appears to win by using his Darklight energy to completely destroy the tower and Abaddon in one huge blast.

Daniel, Madrid, Matthew and a few other minor characters survive the end of the story arc. The story concludes in its own miniseries called Spawn: Blood & Salvation.

=== Issues 5–29 ===
The rest of the Curse of the Spawn issues focuses around related characters from the main Spawn series, like Jessica Priest, Sam and Twitch, The Angel Abdiel and Angela, Hatchet a Zombie Spawn, and other tales of other hell throughout the comics timelines.

Some of these stories include: An angel named Abdiel sent to spy on Malebolgia is tricked and banished from heaven, A Greek boy named Raenius, who was killed by Zeus (the god) and resurrected as a Hellspawn, who kills Zeus with the gorgon Medusa by his side.

== Trade paperback collections ==
- Curse of the Spawn: Book 1: Sacrifice of the Soul — issues #1-4
- Curse of the Spawn: Book 2: Blood and Sutures — issues #5-8
- Curse of the Spawn: Book 3: Shades of Grey — issues #9-11, 29
- Curse of the Spawn: Book 4: Lost Values — issues #12-14, 22
- The Best of Curse of the Spawn — issues #1-8, 12–16, 20-29
