= Tony Daniels =

Canadian voice actor

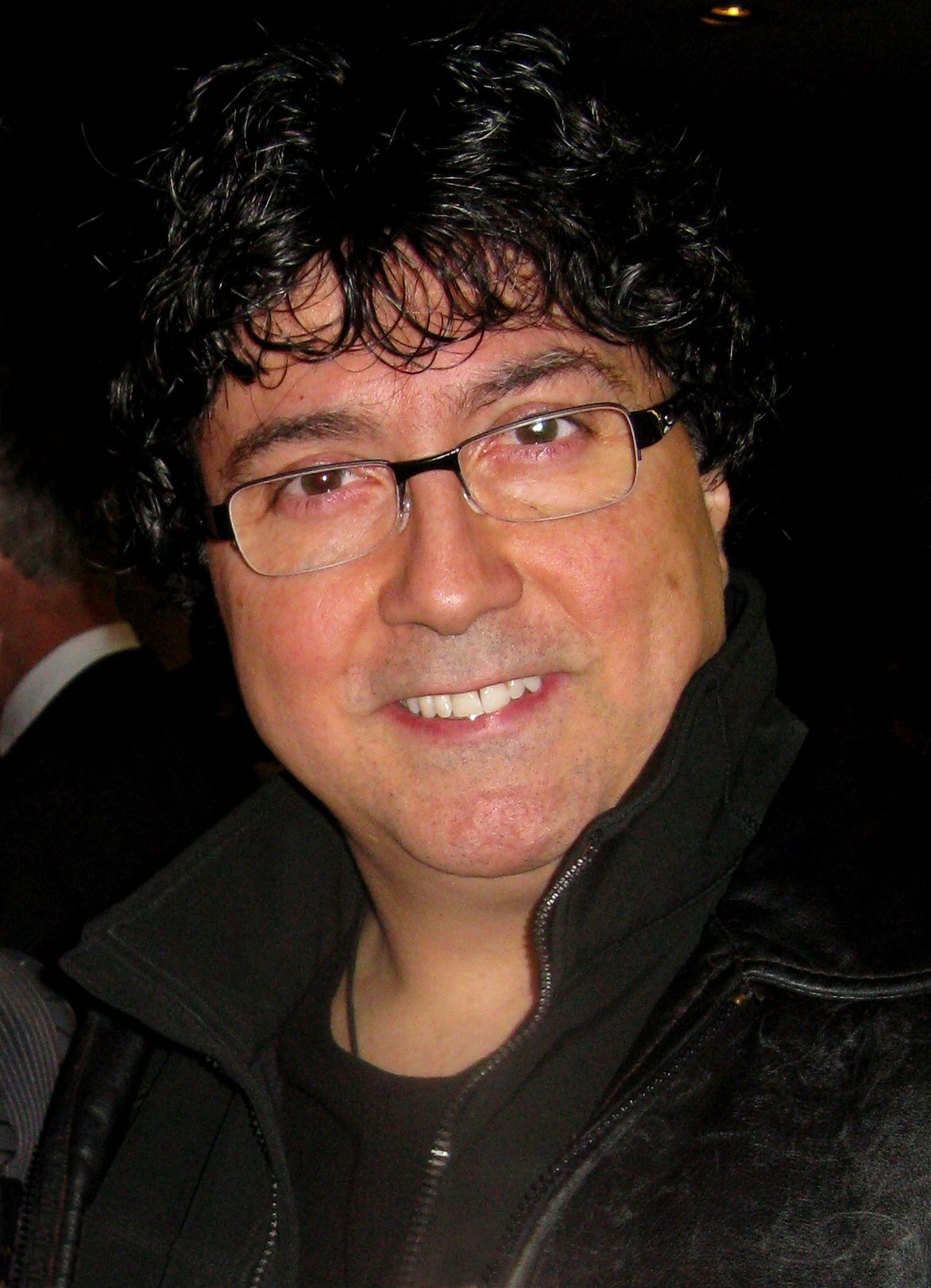
- Tony Daniels at the CBC Winter Launch in 2010
- Born: Toronto, Ontario, Canada
- Other name: Mike Rose
- Occupation: Voice actor
- Years active: 1987–present
- Website: https://tonydaniels.com/

Tony Daniels is a Canadian voice actor. He is well-known for providing the voices of Uncle Flippy in JoJo's Circus, as well as Jedite and Wiseman in the original English dub of Sailor Moon. He is also known for providing the voice of Gambit in X-Men: The Animated Series and Marvel vs. Capcom series. Daniels also provides voices for CBC Television and CBC News Network and appeared on camera in shows and films including Code Name: Eternity, Gracie's Choice, Get Ed, and Eerie, Indiana: The Other Dimension.

In the mid-2010s, he moved to New York City; however, he still does voice acting for Canadian productions.

== Voice acting roles ==
Year	Title	Role	Notes
1987	Beverly Hills Teens	Additional voices	
1987	My Pet Monster	Additional voices	
1987	The New Archies	Additional voices	
1987	Sylvanian Families	Additional voices	
1988	Police Academy	Mr. Sleaze	
1989	Babar	Additional voices	
1990	Little Rosey	Dad	
1994	Hello Kitty and Friends	Grandpa Kitty	
1994	Free Willy	Additional voices	
1994–1995	Monster Force	Various	
1995	The Busy World of Richard Scarry	Additional voices	
1995	Rupert	Additional voices	
1995	Polka Dot Shorts	Humpty	
1995–1998	Sailor Moon	Jedite, Wiseman	
1996	X-Men vs. Street Fighter	Gambit, Narrator	
1996	Flash Gordon	Additional voices	
1996–1998	Stickin' Around	Additional voices	
1997	X-Men	Gambit	
1997	Kassai and Leuk	Additional voices	
1997	The Adventures of Sam & Max: Freelance Police	Additional voices	
1997	Pippi Longstocking	Additional voices	
1997	Mr. Men and Little Miss	Additional voices	
1997	Little Bear	Additional voices	
1997	Tales from the Cryptkeeper	Guardian	
1997	The Count of Monte Cristo	Additional voices	
1997	Diabolik	Inspector Gink	
1997	Marvel Super Heroes vs. Street Fighter	Narrator	
1997–2000	Ned's Newt	Additional voices	
1998	Eerie, Indiana: The Other Dimension	Elvis	
1998	Birdz	Additional voices	
1998	Mythic Warriors: Guardians of the Legend	Various	
1998	Anatole	Additional voices	
1998	Silver Surfer	Additional voices	
1998	Pippi Longstocking	Additional voices	
1998	Flying Rhino Junior High	Additional voices	
1998	Tommy and the Wildcat	Jaska (English version)	
1998	Marvel vs. Capcom: Clash of Super Heroes	Gambit	
1999	Rescue Heroes	Hal E. Copter	
1999	Watership Down	Narrator	
1999	Blaster's Universe	Buzz	
1999	Franklin	Additional voices	
1999	Redwall	Additional voices	
1999–2000	The Avengers: United They Stand	Hawkeye, Tiger Shark, Aries	
2000	Diabolik	Dane	
2000	X-Men: Mutant Academy	Gambit, Wolverine	
2000	Spawn: In the Demon's Hand	Malebolgia, Admonisher, Overtkill, Curse	
2000	Marvel vs. Capcom 2: New Age of Heroes	Gambit	
2000	Code Name: Eternity	Master of Ceremonies	
2000	The Seventh Portal	Slyme, Krog	
2000–2001	Marvin the Tap-Dancing Horse	Additional Voices	
2000–2005	The Accuser	Fullbright, Charle Johnson Savitch	
2001	Braceface	Additional voices	
2001	John Callahan's Quads!	Additional voices	
2001	Medabots	Additional voices	
2001	Onimusha: Warlords	Fortinbras, Osric	English version
2001	X-Men: Mutant Academy 2	Gambit, Wolverine	
2001	Devil May Cry	Mundus	English version
2002	X-Men: Next Dimension	Gambit, Wolverine	
2002	Power Stone	Various	
2002	Little People: Big Discoveries	Farmer Jed, Jack, Police Officer Patrick, Tommy Topping	
2002	Totally Spies!	Additional Voices	
2002	Beyblade	Dunga, Doctor B, Boris Balkov, Rick Anderson, Michael Summers (episodes 24-52 of G-Revolution) Lupinex, Zomb, additional voices	
2003	The Berenstain Bears	Additional voices	
2003	Rescue Heroes: The Movie	Hal E. Copter	
2003	Cyberchase	Melvin	
2003	Jacob Two-Two	Additional voices	
2003	Defending Our Kids: The Julie Posey Story	Various	
2003	Blizzard	Additional voices	
2003	Jacob Two-Two	Additional voices	
2003–2007	JoJo's Circus	Uncle Flippy	
2004	Gracie's Choice	Samuel Gordon	
2004	Gettysburg: Three Days of Destiny	General U.S. Grant	
2004	The Black Mirror	Samuel Gordon	
2005	Delilah and Julius	Additional voices	
2005	The Manly Bee	The Manly Bee	
2005–2006	Time Warp Trio	Uncle Joe, Mad Jack	
2005–2006	Get Ed	Anthony Ol'Skool	
2006	Postcards from Buster	Jack Rabbitson, Announcer	
2006–2008	Yin Yang Yo!	Kraggler, Slug, Rhino Guard, Ultimoose, Floating Head Spirit #1/Indestructo-Bob, Accountant	
2007	Busytown Mysteries	Additional voices	
2007	My Opposition: the Diaries of Friedrich Kellner	Friedrich Kellner	
2007	Friends and Heroes	Tobias	
2008	Far Cry 2	Additional voices	
2008	Transit Lounge	Superintendent	
2010–2013	The Cat in the Hat Knows a Lot About That!	Woody	
2010–2013	Sidekick	Maxum Brain	
2012–2015	Daniel Tiger's Neighborhood	X the Owl	
2013	Metegol	Additional voices (US dub)	
2016	Fangbone!	Carl, Warwagon	
2018	Red Dead Redemption 2	The Local Pedestrian Population	
2018–2021	Transformers: Cyberverse	Teletraan X, Teletraan-1, Lockdown, Drift/Deadlock, Croaton, Kup, Ego, Astrotrain, Ramjet	Credited as Mike Rose for 3 seasons
2020	Transformers: Battlegrounds	Teletraan X, Seeker Male 1, Scout Male 2	
2020	Battletoads	Uto	Credited as Mike Rose
2021	Mighty Express	Freight Nate (singing voice)	Episode: "Big Bart's Wild Ride"
