= Freak (Image Comics) =

The Freak

Publication information
- Publisher: Image Comics
- First appearance: Spawn #33 (July 1995)
- Created by: Todd McFarlane; Greg Capullo

In-story information
- Alter ego: Bryan Kulizczi
- Species: Human later undead
- Notable aliases: Mr. Kulbiczi

The Freak is a supervillain featured in the Spawn comic book series. Also known as Mr. Kulbiczi, he is a psychopath whose mental illness and delirium was the result of his ex-wife telling him she didn't want children. He was committed to an asylum but later built himself a mansion in the sewers.

== Fictional character biography ==
The Freak first appeared as a background character in Spawn #33, in which he saved the Violator from drowning.

After running away, he later reappeared, apparently being attacked by a gang of thugs. Spawn rescues him and is later convinced by The Freak to help him kill Dr DeLorean and avenge the death of his family. After doing this for him it is discovered that The Freak is in fact insane and that Spawn has been tricked into murdering The Freak's own therapist. The Freak reappears again later with a gang of street thugs who manage to overpower and apparently kill Spawn when they capture him in the Deadzone. The necroplasm he saves from Spawn's crucified body would later cause a murdered bum, Eddie Beckett, to be reborn as The Heap. Spawn's body is retrieved from the Deadzone by Sam Burke and Twitch Williams, which allows Spawn to return to life thanks to bugs and insects in the alley.

The Freak is killed when Spawn suffocates him with insects that were created when Spawn took The Freak's inner evils and gave them tangible form. Seeking to return to their place of origin they attempt to reenter The Freak, but in doing so suffocate him.

== See also ==
- Spawn villains
