= Jason Wynn =

Publication information
- Publisher: Image Comics
- First appearance: Spawn #1 (May 1992)
- Created by: Todd McFarlane

In-story information
- Full name: Jason Broderick Wynn
- Team affiliations: US Government; National Security Agency
- Notable aliases: The Man, Black Soldiers, Disruptor
- Abilities: High-order intellect; Shrewd organizer and manipulator; Gifted and ruthless bureaucrat; Proficient in martial arts; Highly skilled marksman

Jason Broderick Wynn is a supervillain appearing in Todd McFarlane's Spawn comic book series published by Image Comics. Wynn is the corrupt director of the United States Security Group. He is perhaps the most powerful man in the world, and has politicians throughout the government on his payroll. His actions caused Al Simmons' soul to be sent to Hell and transformed into Spawn in the first place, making him one of the main antagonists in the comics as a result. Wynn also runs a heavy trade within the black market, and has formed himself a multitude of underground alliances, some of which include the Chinese triads and the Mafia, whose boss, Tony Twist, answered directly to Wynn. He is depicted, in many ways, to be a reincarnation of Genghis Khan.

== Fictional character biography ==
Jason Wynn is the director of the United States Security Group, an umbrella agency encompassing the Central Intelligence Agency, the National Security Agency, and National Security Council. When working for Wynn, Simmons had been ordered to carry out too many bloody missions and atrocities with fewer and fewer satisfactory explanations, and was beginning to ask difficult questions; to Wynn, the master controller, this was intolerable. While on a mission, Wynn had Simmons ambushed by his partner, Chapel, and burned alive. As Spawn, Simmons came back seeking revenge, but Wynn somehow always manages to escape.

Wynn uses Machiavellian intrigue and subtle machinations to expand his power base. Wynn provides weapons to rebel armies in different countries, sometimes playing two factions off against one another so that whoever wins will be indebted to him. He is cold, calculating, and utterly ruthless.

=== Deal with the "Devil" ===
Wynn had an agreement with Malebolgia in which he traded the soul of his best soldier, Simmons, in exchange for psychoplasm, the supernatural substance containing profound powers and is the very essence of what Hell is made of in the Spawn universe. The sample that Wynn obtained from the demon lord was combined with Simmons' memories and transformed into a training ground made up of building from his past known as "Simmonsville," which was a small piece of Hell on Earth and a very important project run by the US Government.

Simmonsville was destroyed by Spawn during Wynn's brief stint as Anti-Spawn/Redeemer I. Because Wynn was tainted by evil, he could not attain his full potential as The Redeemer and was defeated. He then had his memory wiped and was returned to Earth two days after his disappearance. After this, Wynn would continue to work off and on with The Clown, Malebolgia's henchman, to try to bring about Spawn's second death.

=== The Return ===
When Mammon restored The Clown's existence on Earth and gave him a pass to take a new body, the Clown chose Wynn and assumed a dominant role in his psyche. The Clown took the form of a hallucination which allowed Wynn to collect himself enough to return to the NSA. He then went on a killing spree in his spare time, brutally murdering women that resembled Wanda Blake.

Wynn was caught in the act, and the Clown's face paint, at a construction site. Spawn beat him and saved the woman.

The Clown finally made his play for Wynn's body. By "stepping on his hands," he caused Wynn to let go of the steel girder he was clinging to and fall to his apparent death, then took full possession of his body.

=== Current status ===
During the torture of Spawn by Grand Inquisitor Thamuz, Wynn was seen in the assembled rogues gallery alongside Clown and The Violator, but it was revealed that they were lower-level demons, masked in the visage of Spawn's enemies through the magic of Thamuz.

Wynn reappeared in issue 167–168. After the white light event, he is alive and separated from Clown, the only side effect being that his hands have become permanently stained red. Though he attempts to regain his political power and authority, he is foiled by Spawn, who confronts Wynn to gather information on the reappearance of Clown/Violator. Throughout his career, Jason Wynn had gathered incriminating evidence on various governments and organizations, preventing him from being terminated and providing him with a bargaining chip to regain his authority if lost. However, Spawn reveals that he had found and destroyed Wynn's collection of evidence, leaving Wynn without the safety net that he had built for himself as protection against all those who want him dead. Spawn then leaves Wynn to his predicament, seeing Wynn as a "dead man".

In Spawn #227, Jason Wynn was finally hunted down and killed by having his neck broken by the new Spawn, former scientist Jim Downing, whose wife was tortured and killed by Wynn prior to his transformation.

==== Return as Disruptor ====
In Spawn's Universe one shot and King Spawn series, it is revealed that Disruptor is a revived Jason Wynn.

== In other media ==
=== Television ===
Jason Wynn appears as a main antagonist in the Spawn cartoon series, voiced by John Rafter Lee.

=== Film ===
Jason Wynn appears as a secondary antagonist in the 1997 film Spawn, portrayed by Martin Sheen. This version of Wynn is the head of an agency known as A6 and is Al Simmons's boss. Unlike his comics counterpart, Wynn in the film betrays and kills Simmons in person with Jessica Priest's help rather than ordering his murder. Following the resurrection and subsequent attack by Simmons that led to the death of Priest, Violator convinces Wynn to have a device attached to his heart that will release Heat 16 worldwide if his vital signs flatline as a deterrent against assassination attempts. However, unbeknownst to Wynn, Violator and Malebolgia want Simmons to kill Wynn in revenge and initiate the apocalypse. Wynn then proceeds to go to the Fitzgerald residence. After Terry Fitzgerald sends an e-mail to reporters that would expose Wynn's illegal activities, Cyan and Wynn enter the room. Wynn shoot Terry's computer monitor and takes the family hostage as Violator shows up. Spawn arrives and nearly kills Wynn, who cowardly reveals that if he dies so does Cyan, leading to Al extracting the device from Wynn's body with magic and destroys it. Following the defeat of Violator, Wynn is arrested by two detectives that resemble Sam and Twitch.

=== Video games ===
- Jason Wynn has appeared as an antagonist in a number of video games based on Spawn including Spawn: Armageddon, Todd McFarlane's Spawn: The Video Game, Spawn: The Eternal and Spawn: In the Demon's Hand.
- Jason Wynn was mentioned in Mortal Kombat 11. In one of her dialogues with Spawn, Sonya Blade states to him that Wynn is now an enemy of the US Government after figuring out Spawn's true identity.
- Jason Wynn's Disruptor form appears as a skin in season 6 of Call of Duty: Modern Warfare 2.

=== Action figures ===
Like many characters in the Spawn Universe, Jason Wynn has been made into a number of action figures.
