= Violator (comics) =

- Violator (right) and his human form of Clown (left) as depicted on the cover of Spawn #14 (Sept. 1993)

Publication information
- Publisher: Image Comics
- First appearance: Spawn #2 (May 1992)
- Created by: Todd McFarlane

In-story information
- Alter ego: The Clown
- Team affiliations: Hell
- Notable aliases: Clown, Demonic, Barney Saunders
- Abilities: Superhuman strength and durability; Longevity; Shapeshifting; Telepathy; Demonic possession; Demonic spirits; Regeneration

Violator (also referred to at times as The Violator) is a supervillain who appears in the Spawn comic books published by Image Comics as one of the main antagonists. The character first appeared in Spawn #2 (cover-dated May 1992) and was created by writer-artist Todd McFarlane.

In 2009, Violator was ranked as IGN's 97th-greatest comic book villain of all time.

== Publication history ==
Violator first appears in Spawn #2 (May 1992). He is a regular character in the Spawn series. In the mid-1990s, he appears in his own three-issue miniseries Violator, written by Alan Moore.

== Fictional character biography ==
Violator is the oldest and most powerful of five hell-born demons known as the Phlebiac Brothers. His main purpose is to guide Hellspawns towards fulfilling Malebolgia's desire: to cultivate evil souls on Earth for Hell's army. Violator has been Hell's guide for multiple Hellspawn, his latest charge being the current Spawn, Al Simmons. However, he views humanity as weak and so asserts that demons should lead the armies of Hell, not Spawn. Accordingly, much of Violator's terrestrial activities, sanctioned by Hell or not, are aimed at proving his superiority to his master. The Violator's current humanoid disguise is that of Clown, a 3'10" overweight, balding man with menacing face-paint and three fingers on each hand. The Violator is not a demon to be taken lightly: he has shown many times that he is more than a match for a young Hellspawn. His hands are tied by his role, though, as he cannot kill a Spawn without an order from his superiors. Violator's role is not to kill the Hellspawn, but to weaken them and cause them to waste their powers in wreaking havoc. His chief purpose is to groom and prepare the young Hellspawn for their service in Satan's army. He has been killed multiple times, each time to be returned to Hell and reanimated by his master.

=== Fighting for his life ===
Violator's brothers turn on him at one point, sending him fleeing for his life through a New York City shopping district. He becomes briefly allied with a moral but naive vigilante.

At one point, Violator is kept prisoner in a scientific facility seeking to weaponize his energies. He has to deal with an unexpected trip to hell, an insanely murderous angel and the facility's director of security, the stone-bodied Badrock.

After suffering a humiliating defeat in Hell during Spawn's return to claim the throne of the 8th sphere, Clown reappeared on Earth on the order of Mammon to wreak havoc in Spawn's life as part of the larger plan to give Nyx an opportunity to betray Al. He was a "mental adviser" to Jason Wynn, his former contact and partner in the deal that cost Al Simmons his life. He helped Wynn regain his sanity and return to the NSA, but had other plans, rather than being charitable. He has assumed the dominant role in Wynn's psyche and when Wynn was vulnerable, hanging from a steel girder many stories up, he caused him to fall to his apparent death. Clown then took over Wynn's body and used it as his new vessel. He turned Wynn's body into a fanged, bloated parody of his former self. Clown then began to attack and 'mark' citizens of Rat City, turning them all into blue face-painted Clowns. It was revealed that the Violator was possessing hundreds of civilians and forcing them to run amok, committing acts of violence and vandalism, all with a smile on their faces. After their attacks brought Spawn to the brink of death, leaving him bleeding and broken on the streets of Rat City in his Al Simmons persona, the Clowns vanished. The Violator has not been seen since, but has revealed that he has been turned loose on Earth with no strings attached, and it is only a matter of time before he returns to plague Spawn anew.

In Spawn #167, a new Clown emerges, who is thin and agile, and fond of using knives. Clown hijacked the body of Barney Saunders, who had been having an affair with a married woman named Wilma Barbera. Trying to escape discovery by Wilma Barbera's husband, Barney Saunders jumped down the garbage chute only to be trapped there a couple of days before the bright light event (Spawn's destruction and recreation of the world), and doomed to be eaten alive by rats and roaches. The new Clown easily escapes and frequently uses a knife to attack his enemies. He also can still change into his demon form when he wishes.

The Violator is revealed to be the cause of all the havoc of an apartment complex, freeing the residents of restraint and allowing them to fulfill their desires and violent urges. This allowed the Violator to create a portal to Hell from which the other Phlebiac Brothers could enter the world. Violator is confronted by Spawn, but easily gains the upper hand in the battle. Mere moments from Violator's victory, Barney Saunder's spirit gains control when his body sees his lover Wilma. Barney Saunders decides to go through the portal into Hell, knowing that the only way to close the portal was to trap himself and Clown on the other side while he could still maintain control over his body. Barney reveals that he was angry at his lover for not coming to save him when he was starving in the garbage chute and takes her with him, stranding The Violator, Saunders and Wilma in Hell.

Clown has recently reappeared in New York City (how he escaped from Hell is unknown). It is Clown who finds the decapitated body of Spawn in the alleys, and it is he who tries to mask the dead zone created after Spawn's suicide. Clown tries hard to keep the Spawn's death a secret and kills anyone aware of the Spawn's demise. Clown plans to put together his own army to bring down the kingdom of Heaven (against the wishes of the "Elders", supposedly very powerful rulers of Hell). He travels to Connecticut to enlist the help of a fellow demon who now assumes the life of a human and is married to a human as well. Clown tries to convince the fellow demon (who has not yet been named) to join his own private army, but to no avail. Unfortunately for the nameless demon, Clown is not going to take "no" for an answer. Clown gives the man two days to get his affairs in order before departing. The man, still defiant, looks in his cabinet to find the severed heads of his prize winning dogs and a note from Clown reading, "I'm not Clowning around!".

Clown is absent for a while, but then reappears in New York City to find an Angel crucified to a wall (done so by the newly ordained Hellspawn). He is unaware that there is already a new Hellspawn and asks the Angel who pinned her to the wall, as he beats her with a crowbar. She laughs at his lack of knowledge about "What your side is doing, Mr. Clown," which angers Clown. He gives her a reason to fear him as he contorts his Clown face into that of the Violator. She says she is unafraid, to which he replies, "There are worse things than death, especially for an Angel"; he then tears the wings from the helpless Angel's back.

After Jim and the Freak arrive on the scene, the Violator reveals himself. Though the Violator tells Jim he has the answers he seeks, it is made clear by the Freak that the Violator is not on his side. When confronted by the truth, the Violator threatens Jim and the Freak. Before Jim can get any information from Violator, he retreats deeper into the alleys. The Violator goes to "slaughter someone who could endanger my plans". In the next scene, the Violator is switching between his two forms in order to trick Jim, pretending the Violator is fighting Clown.

Clown emerges and claims that he has dispatched the Violator. The Freak curses Clown and then retreats in fear. Clown and Jim are left alone. Clown explains a little about Jim's newfound power; that his costume is alive and that there are ways of controlling it. He then laments over the Angel's current insanity. He makes Jim believe that someone else had been behind this vile act and not he. Clown explains that he is Jim's ally and that Jim should trust him in order to find the answers he seeks. Before the two can converse any longer, Clown dashes away, telling Jim that he has an appointment and he will see Jim around.

Clown is nearly run down by Sam and Twitch's car, after running in front of it. Clown is then pursued by the two detectives after he urinates on their car. After being stopped by Twitch, and tackled by Sam, Clown is taken to the pair's precinct (although this was obviously Clown's plan). Clown is put into a cell with three other men. Clown sits beside and talks to the one he identifies as Claudio.

He tells Claudio that he wishes to have a conference with Claudio's boss. Claudio becomes defensive and asks why Clown thinks the boss would want to see him. Clown explains to Claudio that he is going to make his boss an offer he cannot refuse. He proclaims that now that he has found a Spawn, he plans to combine his power, Spawn's power, and Claudio's boss' power in order to make the New Unholy Trinity. Spawn 294 and 295 reveals that he had made Spawn's powers and all of the other Hellspawns. Later, 300 confirms that Violator was the one who killed Wanda Blake and had evolved to a point as he is now more bulky in his demon form.

In Spawn #300, Spawn fights Violator, who is revealed to be still alive. The fight continues into issue #301, where Clown vanishes after an explosion.

Clown returns in Gunslinger Spawn, where it is revealed that he now has the ability to split himself into various aspects and now he can manifest the Clown and the Violator, while maintaining his new forms autonomy, at the same time.

=== Other versions ===
Violator and his siblings are New York's ad-hoc police force in the dystopia-Spawn-ruled future of 2015.

== Powers and abilities ==
Being a relatively mid-level demon within Hell's hierarchy, the Violator possesses considerable strength and resilience to injuries; enough to tear out a Hellspawn's heart with one hand and survive multiple high-caliber gunshots that would instantly kill or cripple a human being. He possessed a degree of shape-changing powers, typically used to take on the appearance of "the Clown". He's also shown to breathe flames and take possession of others. As with any demon, he can only be destroyed by an equal or higher power such as a Hellspawn or Heavenly weapons.

== In other media ==
=== Television ===
- Violator appears as a secondary antagonist in the HBO series Todd McFarlane's Spawn. The Violator in his human form was voiced by Michael Nicolosi, and in his demonic form by James Hanes. Violator's true form is only shown briefly in three episodes while his human form appears in most of the episodes of the series.
- An assortment of Violators appear in the Robot Chicken episode "Celebutard Mountain", voiced by Seth Green.

=== Film ===
Violator appears as a main antagonist in the 1997 live-action Spawn film portrayed by John Leguizamo in Clown form. His true demonic form was achieved through a combination of animatronic puppetry and CGI. He is responsible for an elaborate scheme to train Al Simmons into an assassin for a military program, and had Simmons' superior Jason Wynn betray and kill him. This leads a vengeful Simmons into agreeing to become the leader of Hell's army. Clown is frustrated that Malebolgia chose Spawn to be his general instead of him. Spawn and Violator had some kind of a rivalry. He is a constant presence in the movie, attempting to get Simmons into the path of evil. In an effort to spread chaos and destruction, he convinces Wynn to attach a device in his body that would cause an apocalyptic disaster in the event of his death. This was part of the scheme to get Simmons to destroy the world. Simmons later confronts the Violator, who turns into his true form and attacks him. The Violator fails to kill him due to the intervention of Cogliostro. Simmons later confronts Wynn and extracts the device before the Violator attacks again, dragging Spawn into a showdown in Hell. Simmons rejects his role as the leader of Hell's army, and alongside Cogliostro, fights off the Violator back on Earth, decapitating him in the end. His head, still conscious, retreats back to Hell.

=== Other comic books ===
The Violator appears in the Japanese manga Shadows of Spawn as well as the Spawn spin-off miniseries Violator and the crossover Violator/Badrock.

=== Video games ===
- The character is a boss in the video games Spawn: The Eternal, Spawn: The SNES Game, Spawn: The Ultimate, Spawn on the Game Boy Advance, and Spawn: Armageddon (voiced by Steve Blum). He also serves as a playable character in Spawn: In the Demon's Hand, voiced by John Stocker and Sean Sullivan in his human and demonic forms respectively.
- Violator also appears in a cameo in Mortal Kombat 11 in one of Spawn's intros, with Spawn putting his head on steel rebar, and in his arcade mode ending.
- Violator also appears as a cameo in Season 6 of Call of Duty Modern Warfare 2 as an unlockable Battle Pass skin.
- Violator appears in Diablo Immortal for the Spawn collab.

=== Music ===
Violator is the subject of the song "Violate" by heavy metal band Iced Earth, from their Spawn-themed concept album The Dark Saga.

=== Action figures ===
Both the demonic and human forms of this character have been the basis for a number of action figures from McFarlane Toys.

=== Web ===
The Violator makes an appearance on Angry Video Game Nerd episode on Spawn games, where he forces the titular gamer to play video games based on the Spawn franchise, while attempting to trick the Nerd into cheating at the games to enact a plan to get the nerd into trouble with the demonic Malebolgia.

== See also ==
- Evil clown
- List of Spawn villains
