= McFarlane Toys =

American toy company

- Type: Private
- Industry: Toys
- Founded: January 20, 1994; 32 years ago
- Founder: Todd McFarlane
- Headquarters: Tempe, Arizona, U.S.
- Key people: Todd McFarlane, CEO
- Products: Action figures
- Brands: Spawn; Hellspawn; Sam and Twitch
- Owner: Todd McFarlane Productions, Inc.
- Number of employees: 100 (2005)
- Website: mcfarlanetoys.com

McFarlane Toys is an American company founded by comic book creator Todd McFarlane which makes highly detailed model action figures of characters from films, comics, popular music, video games and various sporting genres. The company, a subsidiary of Todd McFarlane Productions, Inc., is headquartered in Tempe, Arizona.

As of 2021, McFarlane featured products with licenses of games and companies such as DC Comics, Demon Slayer: Kimetsu no Yaiba, Bleach, Warhammer, Mortal Kombat, Disney, The Princess Bride, and Avatar: The Last Airbender.

== Overview ==
The company was founded in 1994 by Todd McFarlane. McFarlane was working with Mattel to produce action figures based on his comic book characters. When the two could not decide on how to make the toys to McFarlane's satisfaction, he reclaimed the toy rights to his characters and started his own toy company.

Originally dubbed "Todd Toys", the name was changed in 1995 following pressure from Mattel, who feared that the new company's name would be confused with that of Barbie's younger brother.

Production began with action figures based upon Todd McFarlane's Spawn comic series and has since grown to feature a large number of licensed property lines including The Simpsons and "Movie Maniacs" (which features numerous famous horror icons such as the Terminator, Freddy Krueger, Jason Voorhees, Michael Myers, Leatherface, and The Thing), as well as other characters and lines like basketball, hockey and baseball legends, along with characters from video games such as Soulcalibur, Onimusha, and Metal Gear Solid. Other media such as story book characters from Where the Wild Things Are have been represented.

The company has produced original works, giving a grotesque twist to fairy tale stories such as The Wonderful Wizard of Oz, and historical figures. McFarlane has collaborated with artists like Clive Barker (on Tortured Souls) and H. R. Giger to produce other original figures.

== Spawn figures ==
The first line of Spawn toys ever produced was released in 1994 and consisted of six figures, the hero Spawn and his medieval counterpart (Medieval Spawn) with Tremor and the villains Violator, Overt-Kill, and Clown, as well as a Spawn Alley Playset, the Spawnmobile and the Violator Monster Rig. They were notably different from the toys common on shelves at the time because of their level of detail in both sculpting and painting. Other toys utilized only a few colors painted in general areas (a single "flesh tone" for the face, etc.) and were tacked to cardboard backs. McFarlane's figures had individual items such as spikes, teeth, claws, and buttons painted individually and packaged encased by hard plastic which surrounded both the figure and blister card, making them more suitable collector's items. Each toy in the first line came with a regular-sized comic (although with fewer pages than the standard 22), which were individualized to the character.

The series would include alternate time periods and different takes on the classic characters with Series 10, 20 and 30 showing homage to the core characters of the books.

Prototypes for Series 35 were revealed in 2008 but the series was cancelled before its release. Series 36 was also teased at SDCC 2008 but was also cancelled. Some of the teased series 36 figures were later released at statues. and was called "Robot Wars". It refers to a villainous "Mechanoid Army".

In February 2024, McFarlane Toys launched the Spawn Wings of Redemption statue, inspired by the cover of Spawn #77 in 1998. The figure 1:8 scale statue. In the same year, for McFarlane's 30th anniversary, the company released a line of four Spawn figures, including some new figures, some returning figures, and a figure of McFarlane himself.

== Anime figures ==
McFarlane Toys has produced licensed figures based on various Japanese anime and manga properties. Series McFarlane have merchandised include Akira, Tenchi Muyo!, Tokyo Ghoul, Attack on Titan, and Naruto Shippuden. In 2019, it was announced that the company had also gained the rights to create figures based on One-Punch Man and My Hero Academia.

On May 22, 2024, it was announced that the company would make action figures based on Bleach: The Thousand Year Blood War series.

== Horror figures ==
McFarlane had been a long-time fan of the horror genre; as such, he decided to produce his own perspective on the classic monsters with the "Todd McFarlane's Monsters Playsets" line in 1997.

McFarlane continued the idea of generating new versions of classic stories and characters, releasing a shocking line subtitled "Twisted Land of Oz" in 2003, which featured vicious or sadistic versions of the Wonderful Wizard of Oz characters created by L. Frank Baum.

In 2004, the third series, subtitled 6 Faces of Madness, used historical killers and madmen as its theme, generating vividly detailed figurines of the 5th-century conqueror Attila the Hun, American "Wild West" gunslinger Billy the Kid, the "mad monk" Rasputin, the British serial killer Jack the Ripper, the Hungarian "Blood Queen" Elizabeth Bathory, and the real-life inspiration for Dracula, Vlad the Impaler.

The fourth series featured Twisted Fairy Tales. The figures were of classic children's stories, including Peter Pumpkin-Eater, Hansel & Gretel, Little Miss Muffet, Humpty Dumpty, and Red Riding Hood; the line incorporated many of the gory elements that consumers had come to expect from McFarlane, but with a sense of ironic humor.

Series 5 featured McFarlane's Twisted Christmas. Like the previous series, the figures all are twisted variations of Christmas, including a hunchback and obese Santa Claus who hides a lifeless skull under a gas mask-like headpiece and wears contraptions on his hands similar to the glove of Freddy Krueger.

== Movie Maniacs ==
In 1998, McFarlane introduced the Movie Maniacs line of static figures. Series One began as a line of horror and science fiction based figures that had been licensed from influential and financially successful horror films such as A Nightmare on Elm Street, The Texas Chainsaw Massacre and Friday the 13th.

The second series of figures expanded the character base for the line into the realms of cult and action cinema, with a figure based on the title character of The Crow. Series three would further push the boundaries of character selection into fantasy, with Edward Scissorhands, straight action with Shaft, and back into cult/sci-fi with Escape from L.A..

In February 2024, it was announced that McFarlane would release more figures in their Movie Maniacs line, including characters from NBCUniversal Movies such as Andy Stitzer from The 40-Year-Old-Virgin, The Dude from The Big Lebowski, and Jake Blues from The Blues Brothers.

In March 2024, McFarlane released four new figures for Fallout. The line includes four figures, one of which is the main character from the video game The Vault Boy. In April 2024, the company released a line based on The Matrix.

== Music figures ==
McFarlane Toys did not solely limit itself to creating figures based on Todd McFarlane's creations. Rather, it branched out into other forms of media, capitalizing on the popularity of famous rock musicians with the release of figures based on the rock legends Kiss in 1997. The number of music figures produced by the company continued to grow in number, diversity, and quality in the following years as they acquired the action figure rights to famous properties such as the Beatles, Rob Zombie, Alice Cooper, Ozzy Osbourne, Metallica, Slash, Iron Maiden's mascot Eddie, Jimi Hendrix, Freddie Mercury and Elvis Presley.

=== KISS ===
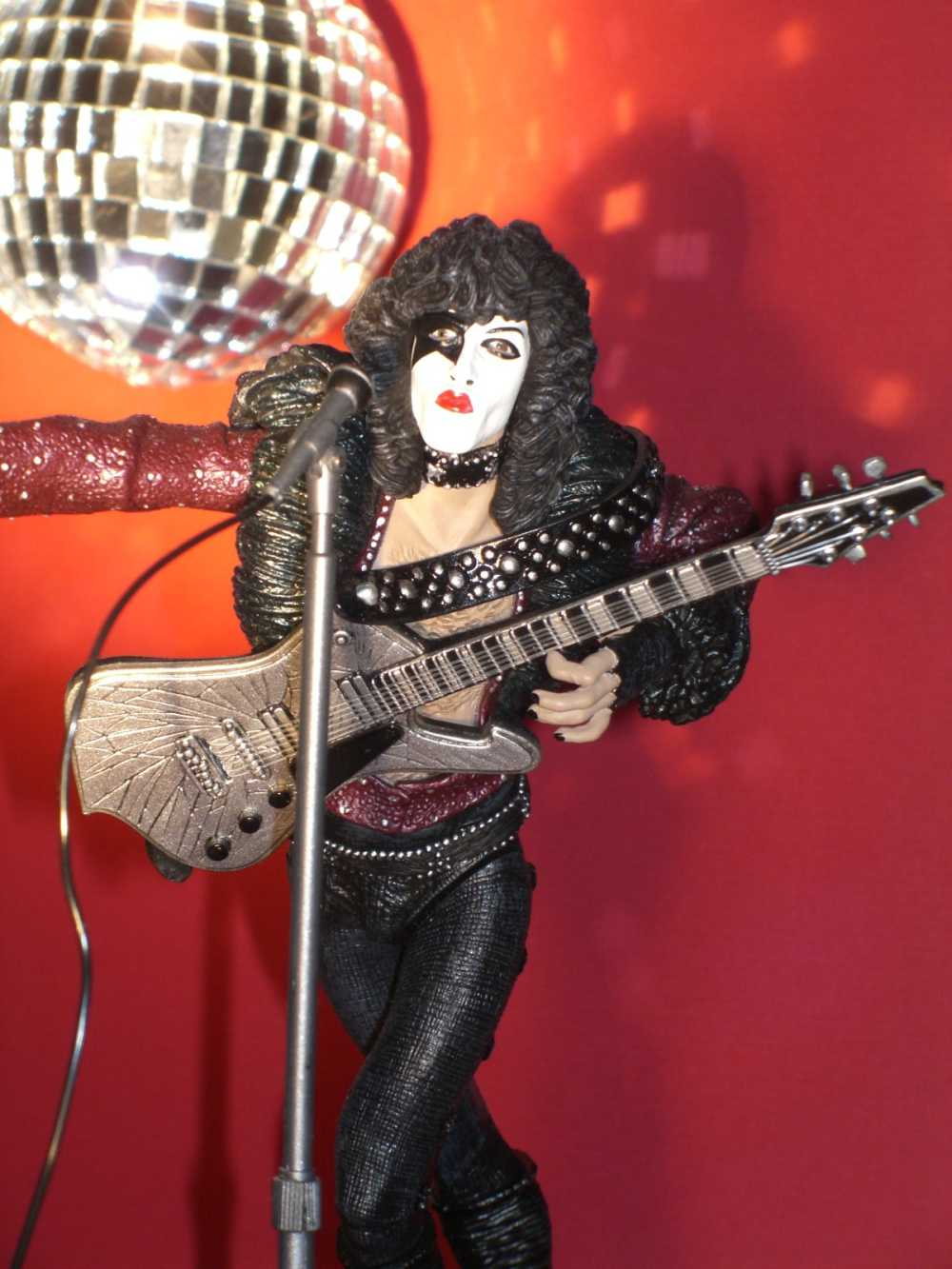
Paul Stanley action figure by McFarlane Toys

In 1997, action figures were part of an overall marketing deal between McFarlane Toys and the rock band Kiss, with both toys and comic books based on their album Psycho Circus. Release of new Kiss products from McFarlane continued until 2007.

=== The Beatles ===
The second musical property that McFarlane released was based on the Beatles, featuring figures of Paul McCartney, John Lennon, George Harrison, and Ringo Starr as they appeared in their 1968 animated film Yellow Submarine, as well as their appearance in the 1965 ABC cartoon show also titled The Beatles. Despite three figure series based on cartoon versions of the band (two incarnations of the Yellow Submarine figures in 1996 and 2004), no figures of the real-life band members have been created by McFarlane Toys.

=== Music Maniacs ===
In March 2024, McFarlane Toys released a Music Maniacs: Metal line. The line includes an Alice Cooper figure and an Ozzy Osbourne figure.

== Sports figures ==
McFarlane Toys reflects Todd McFarlane's love of sports in its creations of popular figures from all five major North American sports (baseball, football, basketball, hockey and stock car racing). The company has official licensing rights to the major professional leagues of all of these sports, and began this line, officially known as McFarlane Sports Picks, in 2001.

In 2023, McFarlane released four NFL action figures. The release included Patrick Mahomes, Jalen Hurts, George Kittle, and Joe Burrow.

== Television figures ==
In January 2007, McFarlane Toys announced plans for a line of 24 action figures. Other series figures have included Lost and The Walking Dead. In 2015, McFarlane toys launched a line of construction sets based on HBO's popular Game of Thrones TV series, followed by a line of 6" action figures to be released in 2019. The company also produces action figures based on the Netflix series Stranger Things.

=== The McKenzie Brothers ===
Released in September 2000, the figures were based on the characters of SCTV and Strange Brew fame, Bob and Doug McKenzie. Bob and Doug McKenzie were originally portrayed by Rick Moranis and Dave Thomas, respectively. The figures were sold separately and each came with half of the diorama from the Great White North set. Each had a sound chip with famous lines from the film and various extras to complete the scene.

=== The Simpsons ===
In 2005, McFarlane acquired the rights held by rival manufacturer Playmates Toys to produce figures based on the popular Fox TV series The Simpsons.

=== Star Trek ===
In 2017, McFarlane Toys agreed a deal to produce action figures and role play items based on the popular Star Trek franchise. Controversy ensued when the company's Star Trek: Discovery phaser toy was cancelled just months before its scheduled release date. In a statement, McFarlane Toys said that the product was cancelled due to disagreements regarding the safety regulations around toy guns in the United States. The first action figures were released in early 2019, with James T. Kirk and Jean-Luc Picard serving as the inaugural entries in the line. Figures of Michael Burnham and Spock were in production; however, neither were released.

== Video game figures ==
McFarlane Toys has produced a number of products based on video games, including Metal Gear Solid, Soulcalibur II (the Xbox version of which featured McFarlane's own Spawn as a guest character), Halo, Five Nights at Freddy's, Call of Duty, Destiny, Cuphead, Borderlands and Assassin's Creed. In 2018, McFarlane Toys launched a series of Fortnite action figures, which differed greatly from the company's previous figures (which were often statue-like and had very limited movement) by including at least 18 points of articulation each. The toys proved very popular, and Todd McFarlane later announced that the increased articulation scheme would become standard in the company's product from then on, including their upcoming line of Mortal Kombat 11 figures.

== Other figures ==
=== DC Multiverse ===
At the tail end of 2018, news broke that Mattel had lost the rights to create figures based on the characters of the DC Universe to Spin Master Studios after 15 years of producing DC merchandise. In February 2019, it was announced that McFarlane Toys had secured the rights to create 6"-12" collector figures based on the various comic books, movies, cartoons, live-action TV shows and video games featuring DC's characters. A reboot of Mattel's DC Multiverse, the line is aimed at adult collectors, in contrast to the all-ages oriented DC toys produced by Spin Master. In a subsequent interview with IGN, Todd McFarlane confirmed that the new figures would target the same collectors who bought other 6" superhero toy lines, such as Mattel's DC Universe Classics or Hasbro's Marvel Legends. He also revealed that the figures would use the new articulation system first seen in the company's Fortnite toys, meaning that they will all include between 18 and 24 points of articulation.

In 2023, McFarlane Toys announced the next line of McFarlane Collector Editions would include a Superman figure. The Superman figure would sport Superman's long hairstyle from the comic book The Death of a Superman and would include a figure of Krypto the Superdog. The Collector Edition also includes Green Lantern Batman and Captain Carrot. The Captain Carrot figure includes four extra hands and a flight stand. The Green Lantern figure includes two energy effects, four extra hands, a power battery, and display base and the Superman figure includes two extra hands, Krypto and a display base. All figures include an art card. In December 2023, McFarlane announced a 2024 release of new action figures. The release includes Bizarro and Batzarro in a combined pack, Nightwing, Superman, and Red Robin Jokerized Gold label.

In December 2023, McFarlane partnered with Hasbro in a multi-brand licensing deal to release new figures in McFarlane's Page Punchers line. The Page Punchers collection includes action figures along with full-size comic books. The first McFarlane and Hasbro Page Punchers release will include G.I. Joe and Transformers in early 2024. In March 2024, McFarlane released a line of Page Punchers inspired by Superman: Ghosts of Krypton.

In January 2024, McFarlane Toys announced a new line of Crisis on Infinite Earths figures, to be released in March 2024. In the same month, McFarlane released new Batman Adventures figures and announced the pre-order of their Cassandra Cain Batgirl figurine.

For the 30th anniversary of Batman Forever, McFarlane released a line of action figures titled, Forever. The line includes Val Kilmer's Batman, Chris O'Donnell's Robin, Jim Carrey's Riddler, and Tommy Lee Jones' Two-Face, as well as other figures.

In July 2024, McFarlane announced a Batman Beyond figure to be released for the 85th anniversary of Batman. The figure will portray Terry McGinnis as Batman in his red and black suit with red wings from the 1999 Batman series. In September 2024, McFarlane announced a release of new Batman cowls including Batman: Knightfall, Batman (1966), and Tim Burton's Batman.

=== McFarlane's Dragons ===
McFarlane's Dragons are a line of action figures which were launched in 2005 under the "Horror, Fantasy and Sci-Fi Action Figures" section of McFarlane Toys. These figures were released biannually.

This set features several highly detailed six inch dragon action figures and a slightly larger and more expansive "boxed set" figure. For the first five series, the figures were broken into these clans: Eternal Dragon Clan, Fire Dragon Clan, Komodo Dragon Clan, Sorcerer's Dragon Clan, Water Dragon Clan, and Berserker Clan. Series Six includes new clans: Fossil Dragon Clan, Hunter Dragon Clan, Ice Dragon Clan, Scavenger Dragon Clan, and Warrior Dragon Clan. In addition to these highly detailed dragons, McFarlane released a part of the dragon's history with each dragon set; some had a piece of the story with each dragon, and some had whole chunks of the story in one boxed set.

=== McFarlane's Military ===
The company launched a "toy soldier" range in 2005 with McFarlane's Military. The figures did not depict actual people so much as it did their professions, named simply by their job descriptions, such as "Army Ranger" or "Navy SEAL." All were of stern-looking males in full military gear, with highly detailed weapons and accessories modeled after the exact materials each soldier would be carrying in real life.

=== Where the Wild Things Are ===
In 2000, McFarlane Toys produced figures based on Maurice Sendak's classic children's book Where the Wild Things Are. Figures include Max, Goatboy (packaged together), Moishe, Emil, Bernard, Aaron and Tzippy. Each character was sculpted with the same crosshatch style from Sendak's original illustrations.

== DC Direct license ==
On July 27, 2021, McFarlane Toys announced that it would take over management of any remaining DC Direct inventory and that it would continue to make statues, busts, and other collectibles (such as action figures) in DC Direct's previous merchandise lines. The company anticipated releasing new products in 2022.

== Controversies ==
A number of McFarlane's figures have attracted criticism and led to boycotts for the subject matter they depict, such as Death Row Marv, which depicts the central character from the graphic novel Sin City in the electric chair, which includes a toggle switch that allows the user to "execute" the character, who shakes and speaks as if being electrocuted when the switch is flipped. Others, such as the company's Austin Powers action figure, were criticized for risqué language in their sound chips and packaging.
