= Tiffany (Image Comics) =

- Tiffany in Spawn Bible

Publication information
- Publisher: Image Comics
- First appearance: Spawn #44 (March 1996)
- Created by: Todd McFarlane; Tony Daniel

In-story information
- Team affiliations: Heaven
- Notable aliases: Tiffany the Amazon
- Abilities: Immortality, trained warrior

Tiffany is a character in Todd McFarlane's Spawn comic book series. Created by Todd McFarlane and artist Tony Daniel, she first appeared in issue #44 (March 1996). Like fellow angel Angela, she is a Hellspawn hunter, whose primary target in the stories is the current Hellspawn, Al Simmons. She has a long-standing rivalry with Angela, but after Angela goes rogue, Tiffany's takes on the mission to fill her place as the top Hellspawn slayer in Heaven's army. In her first attempt to slay Spawn, she is over-zealous and is defeated in a grisly manner. Although she loses the fight, she escapes with her life, because the still inexperienced Spawn did not realize that merely destroying an angel's physical body is not enough to truly kill it. She has not appeared in the comic since.

== Costume ==
Tiffany's costume includes gauntlets that can be used to contact others with similar technology via a hinged screen, completely concealing it while in battle. Her right boot is wide at the base and tapering to the knee. From a brown leather belt dangles hooks and pouches. Tiffany wears a tight violet bikini.

== In other media ==
Tiffany (called Tiffany of the Amazoni) is a featured character in the online comic The Adventures of Spawn. In this animation-style reimagination of the Spawn mythos, Tiffany takes a much greater role in the story, being cited as one of Heaven's most illustrious and honored warriors.

Tiffany is a playable character in the video game Spawn: In the Demon's Hand, voiced by Alyson Court.
