= Curse (character) =

The Curse
- The Curse

Publication information
- Publisher: Image Comics
- First appearance: Spawn #27 (January 1995)
- Created by: Todd McFarlane; Greg Capullo

In-story information
- Alter ego: Phillip Krahn
- Abilities: Supremely gifted mind, various cybernetic and mystic enhancements created from knowledge both scientific and occult.

The Curse is a supervillain in the comic book Spawn. The Curse in the book is a billionaire and a religious zealot who seeks a place in Heaven and knows far more about the war between Heaven and Hell than most on Earth.

== Fictional character biography ==
The Curse, born Phillip Krahn, seeks a chance to lead Heaven's armies against the armies of Hell. When he was a boy he removed his left eye and scarred his face with a large, deep scratch from a rusty metal fence running horizontally over his right eye. He removed his right arm when he was older to show his dedication to God. He grew to become wealthy and studied the occult. He used technology to rebuild his arm, far stronger and better than it was before.

He sought to gain Spawn's powers, believing him at first to be a soldier of Heaven, but Spawn destroyed his bionic arm and beat him severely, leaving the Curse crucified on a wall in Rat City to teach him and others that the alleys belong to Spawn. He was found and tortured by the demon-hunter, Sankser.

The Curse escaped from the alleys and returned to his mansion where he began to plot his revenge and recuperate from his many injuries by combining cybernetics with demonic parts. Feeling his place in Heaven forever denied to him because of his failure to destroy Spawn he sought to gain all the knowledge of Hell so that he might overthrow Malebolgia and recreate Hell as his own Kingdom.

He appeared later in the book, Curse of the Spawn, aiding and ultimately betraying Tony Twist before another apparent brush with death. He was hit by Twist's car and shot by numerous weapons as the volatile chemicals around his lab were also hit and the resulting explosion engulfed everyone involved. Given his penchant for survival, and the fact that he has never been shown to be in Hell as other Spawn villains before him (Kincaid, Freak, etc.) it is unlikely that The Curse is actually dead.

Curse would later return during the Jim Downing arc and again as a zombie in Spawn #290 under Simmons's control.

== In other media ==
Curse appears in Spawn: In the Demon's Hand, voiced by Tony Daniels.

== See also ==
- List of Spawn villains
