= Angela (character) =

Marvel and Image Comics superhero

- Cover of Guardians of the Galaxy #6 (2013), by Sara Pichelli

Publication information
- Publisher: Image Comics (1993–2000); Marvel Comics (2013–present)
- First appearance: Image Comics: Spawn #9 (March 1993); Marvel Comics: Age of Ultron #10 (June 2013)
- Created by: Neil Gaiman; Todd McFarlane

In-story information
- Alter ego: Aldrif Odinsdottir
- Species: Asgardian
- Place of origin: Asgard
- Team affiliations: Guardians of the Galaxy; Asgardians of the Galaxy; Strikeforce; A-Force
- Notable aliases: The Hunter; Queen of Hel
- Abilities: Superhuman strength, speed, agility, stamina, reflexes, and endurance; Healing factor; Immortality; Flight; Master hand-to-hand combatant

Angela is a superhero created by Neil Gaiman and Todd McFarlane who appears in American comic books published by Marvel Comics, and formerly in comics published by Image Comics. She first appeared in Spawn #9, published in 1993 by Image, and starred in a self-titled limited series published in 1994. The character is an angel and bounty hunter working on behalf of Heaven, and is a recurring adversary and occasional ally to the antihero Spawn.

A legal dispute between McFarlane and Gaiman over ownership of the character concluded in 2013 in Gaiman's favor. Gaiman subsequently sold the rights to the character to Marvel, where she debuted in the 2013 comic series Age of Ultron. The 2014 storyline "Original Sin" retroactively established a new origin story for Angela as Aldrif Odinsdottir, the sister of the superhero Thor.

== Publication history ==
=== Image Comics ===
In 1993, Todd McFarlane contracted Neil Gaiman, along with three other recognized authors, Alan Moore, Dave Sim, and Frank Miller, to write one issue of his creator-owned comics series Spawn, which was published by Image Comics. While doing so, Gaiman introduced the characters Angela, Cogliostro, and Medieval Spawn. All three characters were co-created and designed by McFarlane. Angela first appeared in issue #9, as an adversary. In 1994 and 1995, a three-issue Angela limited series was published, written by Gaiman and illustrated by Greg Capullo, in which Angela and Spawn were forced by circumstance to temporarily work together as allies. The series was later reprinted as a trade paperback titled Angela Trade Paperback, retitled as Spawn: Angela's Hunt in later printings and given a new cover design (ISBN 1-887279-09-1).

The monthly Spawn series continued to feature all of the characters Gaiman had created long after his direct involvement had ended. Angela would appear in several Spawn issues such as #96 through #100, and in the 1994–95 limited series Angela. She was also featured in several crossovers. The Rage of Angels miniseries saw Angela meeting Glory in Angela and Glory (1996), and was continued in Youngblood #6 (1996) and Team Youngblood #21. There was also a crossover called Aria/Angela, in which she featured in the series Aria.

McFarlane had agreed that Gaiman retained creator rights to the characters, but later claimed that Gaiman's work had been work-for-hire and that McFarlane owned all of Gaiman's co-creations entirely, pointing to the legal indicia of Spawn #9 and the lack of legal contract stating otherwise. McFarlane had also refused to pay Gaiman for the volumes of Gaiman's work that McFarlane republished and kept in print. In 2002, Gaiman filed suit and won a sizable judgment against McFarlane and Image Comics for the rights due any creator. All three characters were then equally co-owned by both men. In 2012, McFarlane and Gaiman settled their dispute, and Gaiman was given full ownership of Angela.

=== Marvel Comics ===
Comic Book Resources confirmed on March 21, 2013, that Neil Gaiman was returning to Marvel Comics and would bring Angela with him. Joe Quesada was quoted as saying her first appearance as a proper Marvel character would happen at the finale of the "Age of Ultron" storyline.

In 2013, it was later confirmed that Marvel Comics bought the rights to Angela from Gaiman.

On May 9, 2013, Entertainment Weekly published the first image of Angela as redesigned by Joe Quesada for her appearances in books published by Marvel Comics. The 2014 storyline "Original Sin" retroactively established a new origin story for Angela as Aldrif Odinsdottir, the sister of the superhero Thor.

== Fictional character biography ==
=== Image Comics history ===
Greg Capullo's rendition of Angela in one of her appearances in Image Comics.

Angela is an angel and a bounty hunter, working under the auspices of Heaven to oppose Spawn. She attempts to kill Spawn upon their first meeting, but is defeated despite her significantly greater experience. Later, he comes to her aid during her trial in Heaven, where he testifies that she had permission to kill him. They are temporarily trapped in a pocket dimension when Spawn's cloak acts to protect him from her weapons. Spawn's restructuring of reality allows them to return from the pocket dimension, and also erases Angela's 'permit' to use her weapons against him. While returning to Earth they start a romantic relationship. However, Angela is killed during the battle with Malebolgia. Spawn returns her body to the angels, who presumably bring her back to life.

=== Marvel Comics history ===
During the 2013 "Age of Ultron" storyline, Angela is revealed to be alive and has been pulled from Heaven as a result of Wolverine's damage to the Omniverse. In a combination of rage and confusion, she charges towards Earth from outer space, only to be intercepted by the Guardians of the Galaxy, leading to her joining the team.

During the Original Sin storyline, it is revealed that she is Aldrif, the daughter of Odin and Freyja, making her sister to Thor and Loki. She was "killed" as an infant during Asgard's war with the Angels of the Tenth Realm called "Heven." This crime resulted in Odin severing the Tenth Realm from the other nine as punishment for their attack. Thor learns of his sister's existence when he is exposed to the secrets of Uatu, the Watcher's eye, by Orb. He returns to Asgard to confront his mother about Angela's existence, and subsequently travels to the Tenth Realm with Loki to learn more about his sister.

The Guardians of the Galaxy and Angela are attacked in warp space by a band of pirates, called Warpjackers. During the battle, Angela abandons the Guardians when the adult Loki telepathically tells her that the portal to Heven is open and that she can return home. As Thor battles Heven's guards, Angela appears having been guided to the doorway to Heven by Loki, and prepares to battle Thor. Angela fights an exhausted Thor who had just fought off the army of Heven, and is then told by the Queen of Angels to bring Thor to her. The now-female Loki has aligned with the Angels, telling Thor that "being on the winning side seems just perfect."

While Loki leads an Angel fleet to Asgard, under the false pretence to help them destroy it, Thor escapes captivity and engages Angela in combat once again. The fight between Thor and Angela is interrupted when Odin (who Loki freed from his self-exile) arrives and recognizes Angela as his daughter, revealing Angela's true lineage as the long thought dead Aldrif. A long time ago, the Angel tasked to dispose of Aldrif's body found out the baby was alive and raised her as one of the Angels under the name of Angela. In light of this revelation, the Queen of Angels grants Angela her life, pardoning her for her service to the Angels, but exiles her from Heven due to her lineage. After leaving Heven, Odin tells Thor, Loki, and Angela that he still loves his children. Angela then decides to leave in order to explore the other realms.

Later, Angela and her lover Sera abduct the newborn daughter of Odin and Freyja. Unbeknownst to Odin, the baby is possessed by the spirit of Surtur and Odin orders Thor to hunt down the pair. Angela and Sera with help from the Guardians of the Galaxy, stay ahead of Thor and take the baby to Heven to be cleansed of Surtur's spirit. There, Angela throws the baby into the stalled engines of Heven. Surtur's fire is expelled from the baby and reignites the engines of Heven. For this action, Angela's debt to Heven is repaid and thus closes her last remaining connection to the realm.

After Angela returns the baby to Odin, she discovers that Sera is actually Malekith the Accursed and the real Sera, who was previously killed in battle, remains in Hel. Angela travels to Hel and petitions Hela to restore her love to life. When Hela refuses, Angela launches a campaign of conquest with the help of Sera and Hela's handmaiden, Leah, completing several trials to become the new Queen of Hel. When she succeeds, she frees the souls of the dead Angels enslaved by Hel, and restores Sera to life, only to abdicate and return to Earth with Sera and Leah, having no need for power.

Angela later joins Strikeforce, an Avengers-adjacent black ops team as the co-leader alongside Blade.

== Powers and abilities ==
In her current Marvel incarnation, Angela is a born god and heir to the Asgardian throne. She has enormous amounts of super strength which enables her to fight opponents like Jane Foster (Thor), super speed where she moves faster than lightning and super durability where she can withstand attacks from the likes of Gamora, Drax and Thor. She also has the ability to fly. Angela can also heal faster than an average human being.

Unlike the rest of Asgardian Gods, Angela is immortal and does not require Golden Apples to sustain her youth. She lived for eons without any sustenance.

== Reception ==
=== Critical reception ===
Screen Rant included Angela in their "10 Best Thor Characters In Marvel Comics But Not In The MCU" list, in their "10 Most Powerful Asgardian Gods In Marvel Comics" list, and in their "10 Best Asgardians Not Yet In The MCU" list, and ranked her 13th in their "15 Most Powerful Asgardians In The Marvel Universe" list. Autostraddle ranked Angela 2nd in their "7 LGBT Women Who Need to Appear in the MCU Immediately" list. Marc Buxton of Den of Geek ranked Angela 22nd in their "Guardians of the Galaxy 3: 50 Marvel Characters We Want to See" list. CBR.com ranked Angela 4th in their "Marvel: The 10 Strongest Female Heroes" list, 5th in their "10 Strongest Asgardians In The Comics" list, and 7th in their "20 Strongest Female Superheroes" list.

=== Accolades ===
In 1995, Wizard Fan Awards nominated Angela for Favorite Villainess, Character Most Deserving of Own Ongoing Title, and Favorite One-shot or Limited Series/Miniseries. In 1996, Wizard Fan Awards nominated Angela for Favorite Heroine.

== Literary reception ==
=== Volumes ===
==== Angela: Asgard's Assassin ====
According to Diamond Comic Distributors, Angela: Asgard's Assassin #1 was the 15th best selling comic book in December 2014. Angela: Asgard's Assassin #1 was the 217th best selling comic book in 2014.

Doug Zawisza of CBR.com called Angela: Asgard's Assassin #1 "one of the most technically stunning debut issues from Marvel", writing, "Stephanie Hans' work is atmospheric and painterly, providing a distinct visual difference from Jimenez's but maintaining the same level of detail and dedication to addressing Angela as a figure flowing through the panels. Hans adds rugged torn edges to the panels, giving them the appearance of being ripped from Sera's or Angela's memories. Just as subtly as "Angela: Asgard's Assassin" #1 shifts from main story to substory, it shifts back out, bringing readers to a conclusion fraught with anticipation. Any comic with "Asgard" in the title is destined to bring in the God of Thunder, but with Thor now being a different Thor than the one Angela is familiar with, Gillen elects to leave readers awaiting the confrontation between Angela and Odinson. To sweeten the pot, the writer teases a surprising reason for the visit, leaving readers with a cliffhanger in the process. It's a solid cap to a solid comic book, as "Angela: Asgard's Assassin" #1 gives readers yet another excellent female-led series in the Marvel Universe." Petra Halbur of The Mary Sue described Angela: Asgard's Assassin #1 as potentially "the best new series in recent memory", asserting, "There's plenty to appreciate about Angela: Asgard's Assassin #1 aside from the heroine's principles, of course. Awesomely, Stephanie Hans' illustrations provide little to no fodder for The Hawkeye Initiative. Despite her ridiculously skimpy armor, Angela remains generally un-sexualized by the artist, striking no poses that draw especial attention to her breasts, legs or butt. I also love Sera's design, a woman, er, angel of color who rocks her celestial armor with a short, plump frame (by comic book standards, anyways). Still, it's this code of justice that really sets Angela apart from other seemingly morally complex antiheroes and opens her up to some interesting possibilities. I can't imagine Thor and Angela will remain adversaries for very long and I dearly look forward to a team up between the honorable God of Thunder, his “balance” obsessed sister and the newly-minted Agent of Axis, Loki: three siblings with fundamentally clashing codes of conduct."

== Other versions ==
=== Secret Wars ===
In 1602: Witchhunter Angela, Faustina aka Angela appears as a hunter of WitchBreed (mutants) in the 1602 universe.

In MODOK: Assassin, an Angela appears as a member of the Thors, Battleworld's peacekeeping force, wielding a hammer called "Demonslayer".

A third appears as a resident of the domain Arcadia, home of the all women superhero team, A-Force.

== In other media ==
=== Television ===
- Angela appears in Todd McFarlane's Spawn, voiced by Denise Poirier.
- Angela appears in Guardians of the Galaxy, voiced by Nika Futterman.

=== Film ===
Angela makes a cameo appearance in Spawn, portrayed by Laura Stepp.

=== Video games ===
- Angela appears in Guardians of the Galaxy: The Universal Weapon.
- Angela appears in Marvel Avengers Alliance.
- Angela appears as a playable character in Marvel: Future Fight.
- Angela appears as a playable character in Marvel: Contest of Champions.
- Angela appears as a playable character in Marvel Heroes, voiced by Laura Bailey.
- Angela appears as a playable character in Marvel: Avengers Alliance 2.
- Angela appears as a playable character in Marvel Avengers Academy, voiced by Natalie Van Sistine.
- Angela appears in Marvel Snap.
- Angela appears as a playable character in Marvel Mystic Mayhem, voiced by Katiana Sarkissian.
- Angela appears as a playable character in Marvel Rivals, voiced by Brittany Cox.

=== Music ===
Angela is the subject of a song by heavy metal band Iced Earth called "The Hunter", which appears on their Spawn-themed concept album The Dark Saga.

=== Tabletop games ===
- Angela has been featured in HeroClix Collectible Miniatures Game.
- Angela has been announced for Marvel Crisis Protocol Miniatures Game.

== Collected editions ==
=== Image ===
Title	Material collected	Published date	ISBN
Spawn: Angela	Angela #1–3 and Angela Special	January 1998	978-1852868352

=== Marvel ===
Title	Material collected	Published date	ISBN
Angela: Asgard's Assassin - Priceless	Angela: Asgard's Assassin #1–6	August 2015	978-0785193562
1602 Witch Hunter Angela	1602 Witch Hunter Angela #1–4 and 1602 #1	March 2016	978-0785198604
Angela: Queen of Hel - Journey to the Funderworld	Angela: Queen of Hel #1–7	July 2016	978-1302900014

== See also ==
- List of Spawn villains
