= Sam and Twitch =

Fictional NYPD homicide detectives

- Sam and Twitch: Udaku #01

Publication information
- Publisher: Image Comics
- First appearance: Spawn #1 (May 1992)
- Created by: Todd McFarlane

In-story information
- Team affiliations: New York Police Department
- Supporting character of: Spawn

Sam Burke and Maximilian "Twitch" Williams are two fictional NYPD homicide detectives created by Todd McFarlane. Sam and Twitch were originally featured in McFarlane's hit comic series Spawn. Due to their popularity, they were later given their own title in 1999, called Sam and Twitch. In their self-titled series, the duo were the protagonists in a dark and gritty New York City. The fictional universe of Sam and Twitch is somewhat different from typical hero comics in that costumed heroes are not the norm.

== Sam Burke ==
Detective Sam Burke is often seen as the brawn of the group. Sam is a large, headstrong man with a penchant for foul language and gruff behavior. Sam is usually the one to take "action" against any type of villain they encounter. Though Sam has often been accused of police brutality, the charges have never stuck. In fact, Sam takes great pride in being one of the few honest cops in a precinct he sees as infested with corruption and scandal. Although his style with criminals is rough, and he comes across as boorish to most others, he is actually quite compassionate, beneath his rough exterior, to those in need. He has a real passion for doing the right thing and seeing justice done, even if he has to resort to not-so-civil means. Sam is very protective of those few he trusts and considers friends, especially his partner Twitch. Twitch's dedication to his work despite the corruption of the police department is shown to be inspiring to Sam, and he often goes to great lengths to protect Twitch from even their fellow officers, who may mean verbal or physical harm to Sam's highly intelligent, diminutive partner.

Despite his down-and-dirty, cynical, and hot-tempered personality, Sam is essentially a good man, with a strong sense of duty and honor. His straightforward ways have often put the detective duo at odds with even their fellow police, but while Twitch is considerably more reasonable than his larger partner (and often pokes fun at Sam's fiery temperament and statements), he shows a deep trust and respect for him as well. While Twitch often figures out and solves the duo's various cases and predicaments, Sam is unquestionably the drive and conviction which sees the two through.

While not as talented as Twitch in deduction, Sam is skilled in being able to see through people and getting information. Even with a large and fat build, Sam has shown considerable strength, speed and durability in fighting superhuman foes. He is capable of going toe-to-toe in a fistfight against the Udaku, who is powerful enough to rip a man's head off. Sam has also displayed some form of police intuition that warns him of traps and lies, which he jokingly calls a "spider-sense".

== Twitch Williams ==
Maximilian Steven Percival "Twitch" Williams III is mainly seen as the "brains" of the partnership. He is the one who usually solves or puts the pieces together in the rare crimes the detectives encounter. A brilliant mathematician who excelled at trigonometry, he has used his knowledge of angles to become an excellent marksman. A shooting prodigy, Twitch makes up for his small size with his ability to handle twin pistols with extreme accuracy and efficiency. He claims to have earned the nickname "Twitch", as Sam once said, "because he doesn't, ever!" In reality, "Twitch" was his despised high-school nickname, which Sam learned after intercepting a reunion invitation asking for "Twitch" Williams. He refers to Sam Burke as "sir", as throughout the years Sam has, time and time again, earned his trust and respect.

Twitch was once married and has several children, but due to his schedule with crime cases, his wife divorced him and was granted custody of their children. This had an emotional impact on Twitch, but did not hinder him from his work. He eventually reconciled with his wife and since then does his best to spend as much time with his family as his duty allows. Twitch comes from a family with a tradition in law enforcement; his father and siblings are also police officers. Despite his reserved and soft-spoken manner, he is passionate and proud of his job. The apparent corruption of the Police Department, which he works for, troubles him. In some ways, Twitch is more naïve than the street-smart Sam, and has had to deal with many harsh truths.

Twitch has battled against many super-human foes such as Overt-Kill, a monstrous, mafia-hired cyborg. Despite Overt-Kill's seemingly bulletproof exterior, Twitch was able to defeat him with a single, well-aimed bullet through Overt-Kill's ear canal.

== Publication history ==
=== Spawn ===
Sam and Twitch were originally introduced in the comic book series Spawn as tertiary characters to the larger storyline of Al Simmons. The duo were at first at odds with Al, both due to Al's questionable methods and personality and Al's own distrust of the police. Eventually however, they had come to form a mutual respect and Al often sought help from the two, seeing them as two of the only people, cops, no less, that he could actually trust. Even after the detectives' own spin-off series had started the two often made appearances in Spawn.

=== Sam and Twitch ===
Due to issues with publishing, Sam and Twitch was not always released in a timely manner. This affected sales. The series was subsequently cancelled in 2003 with only 26 issues after a four-year run. The delays continued until the end.

The character Spawn makes a small cameo appearance in Sam and Twitch and requests the duo's help. Sam and Twitch say that they are preoccupied and brush him off.

The series has been collected as these graphic novels:

- Sam and Twitch Book One: Udaku TPB - collects #1-8 in black & white (Image Comics, 2000, 192 pages, ISBN 1-58240-176-4)
- Sam and Twitch: The Brian Michael Bendis Collection Volume 1 TPB - collects #1-9 (Image Comics, 2006, 224 pages, ISBN 1-58240-583-2)
- Sam and Twitch: The Brian Michael Bendis Collection Volume 2 TPB - collects #10-19 (Image Comics, 2007 ISBN 978-1-58240-745-6)
- Sam and Twitch: The Complete Collection Book 1 Hardcover- Collects Issues 1-13
- Sam and Twitch: The Complete Collection Book 2 Hardcover- Collects Issues 14-26
- Sam and Twitch: The Writer TPB

=== Case Files: Sam & Twitch ===
The first issue of Case Files was released in June 2003, a few months before the November cancellation of the original Sam and Twitch series. Whereas the original series was concurrent with the duo's appearances in Spawn, the continuity of Case Files starts much later in their lives and revisits one of their old nemesis.

=== Sam and Twitch: The Writer ===
A four-issue mini series.

=== Sam and Twitch: Case Files ===
A new series from the Spawn universe line.

== Other notable characters ==
- Dr. K. C. McRory - Dubbed "Dr. Death" by the detectives, Dr. McRory is in charge of the crime scene investigation department at the precinct. As with many characters, she dislikes Sam for his sloppy habits and abrasive personality. She gets along quite well with Twitch.
- Jinx - A bounty hunter who assists the duo in tracking down a fellow hunter who has gone insane. Jinx also stars in a separate comic book series.
- Helen Williams - Twitch William's wife
- Max Williams IV - first son of Twitch and Helen
- Peter Williams - second son of Twitch and Helen
- Lauren Williams - first daughter of Twitch and Helen
- Lily Williams - second daughter of Twitch and Helen
- Monica Starlight - a police officer
- Joseg Udaku - a South African crime boss
- Fedoras - bioweapon soldiers of the Udaku
- Seamus Halloran - a corrupt businessman

== In other media ==
- In the HBO miniseries Todd McFarlane's Spawn, Sam was voiced by James Keane and Twitch was voiced by Michael McShane.
- In the 1997 live-action film, two detectives resembling Sam and Twitch arrest Jason Wynn towards the end of the film. It is stated that Todd McFarlane wanted a film to be about Sam and Twitch and Spawn would have been the background character. Sam and Twitch were going to investigate the murders that Spawn was involved in.
- Sam & Twitch appeared in the Spawn: In the Demon's Hand video game, voiced by Rob Cowan and Don Dickinson respectively.
- Like most of McFarlane's characters, Sam & Twitch has been the basis for several action figures by McFarlane Toys.
- In February 2017, the head of BBC America revealed that Kevin Smith was attached to write, direct, and executive produce a Sam & Twitch police procedural for BBC America. Similar to the comic book, each episode of the series was planned to follow a closed-ended procedural format, with certain character-serialized aspects to the storytelling.
- In July 2018, Jeremy Renner was announced to play Twitch Williams in McFarlane's King Spawn.
