= Mammon (comics) =

Publication information
- Publisher: Image Comics
- First appearance: Spawn #87 (September 1999)
- Created by: Todd McFarlane; Brian Holguin; Greg Capullo

In-story information
- Team affiliations: Hell
- Notable aliases: "Mr. Hell", as well as presumably many of the names associated with The Devil, Mr. Malefick
- Abilities: Shapeshifting; Flight; Telepathy; Superhuman strength; Telekinesis; Immortality; Omnipotence (9th Sphere of Hell)

Mammon (/ˈmæmən/) is a supervillain and one of the main antagonists of the comic book Spawn. He serves as the second main antagonist having replaced Malebolgia in that role until Spawn #184 (October 2008), in which Malebolgia again takes back this role from Mammon, although Mammon would return as the main antagonist in the 50/50/50 crossover event.

== Fictional character biography ==
Mammon is depicted as a handsome gentleman, suave and sophisticated. This demon is often seen making attractive deals with humans for their souls and is thought to be quite persuasive. A master schemer, he is the puppet-master behind most of the machinations facing Al Simmons, and is seeking the Throne of Creation so that he might remake the universe to his own whim.

Mammon's past is very much shrouded in mystery. It has been revealed that he was one of The Forgotten, a group of muses that stayed loyal to God but refused to fight against their fellow archangels in the War in Heaven. For this, he and his kind were banished from Heaven, but unlike the rest of The Forgotten, Mammon was not bound to The Tiend and instead appears to have been cast into Hell. He has transformed into a demonic entity on one occasion, on which he was assaulted by Spawn and scarred with three cuts from the Hellspawn's claws.

He is a high-ranking Lord of Hell. It is unknown which sphere he controls, if he controls one at all, but he is obviously one of the most powerful beings in Hell. It has been stated that, while Malebolgia was the King of Hell and ruler of the 8th Sphere, he was a fly in comparison to Mammon. It has also been said that he doesn't have the power to grant certain things; the only one who can is Satan. This is supported by Thamuz, who refers to Mammon as Lord, but to Satan as Master. It is later revealed that Mammon is the seemingly omnipotent ruler of the 9th Sphere, and had been for 20,000 years after he killed the previous ruler of the 9th Sphere, Thurifer.

Thus far, Mammon has made Spawn's life truly a living Hell. He is probably the brains behind the scheme to unleash Urizen, which leads to Spawn destroying Malebolgia. Mammon was alive during the time Urizen was first contained, while Malebolgia was only created 70,000 years prior to his second coming. Additionally, he orchestrates the plot to give Cog the means and opportunity to betray Spawn and seize control of the 8th Sphere of Hell. He is the stranger who tells Eddie Frank of redemption, which leads to Eddie becoming The Redeemer and beating Spawn badly enough that he could be dragged into Hell. He reveals the truth about Eddie's father to him to destroy his faith, weaken his powers and halt his attack while his minions capture Spawn. He sends Violator to Earth to take over Jason Wynn's body in order to break Spawn physically and mentally. Mammon personally takes the soul of Nyx's friend, Thea, to use as leverage later on to make Nyx betray Spawn by stealing his costume and going into Hell. While he is incapacitated, she dons the K7-Leetha. This is part of a larger plan to gain Nyx's powers. He approaches her prior to her betrayal and tries to bargain with her. He also tells her about Thea's soul being in Hell.

Nyx tries to outsmart Mammon by making a deal with another minor Lord of Hell known as N'Zzezheaal, who turns out to be Mammon in disguise. In the end, he gets her powers and uses them to destroy Spawn's memories of Wanda and then sends him on his way to break the Tiend and release The Forgotten so that they might begin the assault on Heaven.

During the reappearance of Satan in Hell during the Armageddon arc, Mammon falls out of power. Even his former servant, Thamuz, is ready to turn on him and destroy him at Satan's command. However, Mammon saves himself from Thamuz by offering Satan a way to increase the ranks of Hell's army - namely, triggering the San Andreas Fault.

It has been stated that there is only one way to destroy Mammon and that Spawn does not possess that power. What it is exactly has not yet been revealed, but it has been hinted that his pride will be his undoing.

Mammon has recently returned along with a robed companion who tells him that Spawn defeated Clown and closed the Hell portal — just as Mammon had wanted him to. Mammon, in turn, calls Spawn "my good and faithful servant."

Mammon also apparently orchestrates the events that lead to Spawn and Nyx in issue 169, returning Nyx's powers in that very same issue.

In the arc "A Tale of Three Brothers" and the arc "Gunslinger Spawn", it is revealed that Mammon has been manipulating Spawn since before he was born and has been controlling his family for generations in preparation for his birth. Mammon, in the guise of Malefick, had seduced Simmons' mother to serve him in his schemes; she only married her husband because Mammon told her to, and she, in turn, allowed Mammon to influence her children from a very young age (an action that would lead to Al Simmons becoming a Hellspawn later on). In the Gunslinger arc, it is revealed that Mammon had known many years beforehand that a descendant of Henry Simmons (Al Simmons' great-grandfather) would become a Hellspawn, also predicting that this Hellspawn would destroy and recreate the world, a prediction that was fulfilled when Al Simmons — Spawn — destroys and then recreates the world in the Armageddon arc.

In issue 182, more of Mammon's past is revealed. It is revealed that upon his fall from Heaven into Hell after the failed uprising against God, he offered his services to Malebolgia, completely unaware that Mammon became the seemingly omnipotent ruler of the 9th Sphere. He then traveled the earth for centuries learning alchemy, divination, and sorcery, eventually coming to the conclusion that the human race could be the greatest of all creation. He then began collecting warriors for Hell's legions, believing that one day there would be a warrior that would lead mankind against both God and Satan during Armageddon. Some time after meeting Al Simmons' great-grandfather, Henry Simmons, Mammon decides to forgo chance and breed such a Hellspawn. Though Al Simmons played a crucial part in both the defeat of Malebogia and the exile of God and Satan (events which were all planned by Mammon), Mammon reveals that Al Simmons is, in fact, not the final product of a 'perfect' Hellspawn that Mammon was seeking. Instead, he chooses Morana, Wanda Blake and Al Simmons' child, whom Mammon took from her parents at the hospital after her mother miscarried. Morana is the product of the merging of the Simmons and Blake bloodlines; two bloodlines which have great potential for making Hellspawn, brought forth through centuries of Mammon's manipulation. Issue 182 also poses the possibility that Al Simmons' actions that caused the miscarriage may have been induced by Mammon's influence throughout Al Simmons' childhood.

In issue 184, it is also revealed that Mammon had influenced Al Simmon's K7-Leetha symbiote costume, prior to its bonding with Al Simmons, promising it great power in exchange for its services and convincing Malebogia that it was worthy to become Hellspawn. It is then also revealed that Mammon plans to transfer the symbiote to Morana, believing that Al Simmons was "finished" after Armageddon and that Morana was the one who would sit by his side and rule the world. He eventually was defeated by Nyx and sealed away alongside Morana. Later issues retcon this, with Malebolgia and Violator as the true makers of the Hellspawns, while Mammon made a few cameos in 296 and 297.

It is also revealed in several issues that Mammon acted as a representative to Malebogia in the past to recruit Hellspawn. In issue 165, Mammon recruits Chenglei to become the Mandarin Spawn and in issue 174, he recruits Jeremy Winston to become the Gunslinger Spawn. In issue 179, he recruits Thomas Coram to become a war spawn. Eventually, even his work for Malebolgia is revealed as another ruse: by selecting and recruiting Hellspawns on his own, he seeks to create a perfect bloodline, reuniting under one final offspring the lines of his best subjects.

During the time Mammon sent the Violator to hell he was captured by a former Hellspawn and his energies were weaponized. A product refused to be utilized to create the next HellSpawn. Also, as the ruler of the 9th Sphere of Hell, Mammon is exceptionally all-powerful within the realm of the 9th Sphere, and, therefore, can control and create Hellspawns, even out of his fellow angels.

== In other media ==
- Mammon has appeared in only one comic title outside of the core Spawn comic, the French-produced title Spawn: Simony.
- Mammon's name was first revealed in a Spawn video game: Mammon appeared as a supporting character in Spawn: Armageddon voiced by Andre Sogliuzzo, and the announcement for the game was the first time the character had been directly named. Prior to this announcement he was only known by the fan-created nickname, Mr. Hell.
- Mammon's action-figure debut was as the Collector's Club Exclusive for Spawn Series 30, slated for a Fall 2006 release. The toy is tied to the web-comic The Adventures of Spawn, in which Mammon is the main antagonist.
- Mammon was mentioned in Mortal Kombat 11.

== Miscellaneous ==
- The term Mammon is used in the New Testament to describe material wealth or greed. Mammon is pseudo-canonically referred to as one of the seven princes of Hell.
