= Tremor (character) =

Character in "Spawn"

- Tremor

Publication information
- Publisher: Image Comics
- First appearance: Spawn #25 (October 1994)
- Created by: Todd McFarlane; Marc Silvestri

In-story information
- Alter ego: Richard Masullo
- Team affiliations: Mafia
- Abilities: Cybernetically enhanced superhuman strength and reflexes, impressive healing abilities, incredible stamina and durability.

Tremor is a character from the comic book series Spawn. He is a former Mafia enforcer and associate of Antonio "Tony Twist" Twistelli, the Don of New York, and is now a vigilante seeking revenge on The Family.

== Fictional character biography ==
Richard Masullo was always the muscle, from his days with his brother David till his time with Twist. When he wanted out of the mob Twistelli had him captured and shipped to Germany, where he was used as the guinea pig for Project: TREMOR, the mafia's first attempt to create a supersoldier. This was the predecessor of the highly successful OvertKill project. Richard was subjected to numerous experiments, mostly gene manipulation but spliced with some cybernetics. The result appeared more demonic than human. The newly dubbed "Tremor" was a failure, as his free will and disgust for what he had become overwhelmed any type of loyalty he had for the mafia. As a result, Twist killed the rest of Tremor's family except for his brother David. Not long afterwards an enraged Tremor broke free from the laboratory. Twist told David that Tremor was the one who slaughtered his family, including Richard, and David went to work hunting Tremor across the globe.

Tremor arrived in New York and heard news of dealings between Spawn and Twist. While trekking the globe he had been taking out facilities belonging to Twist. This work continued in New York. He attacked Spawn, mistaking him for an ally of the mob. The two came to a sort of understanding and teamed together to go after Twist. They slashed through Twist's men and almost took him out, but David stepped in and fought against Tremor. As Richard revealed himself to his brother, David couldn't understand or believe what was going on because of his own guilt and his hatred for Tremor and began to unload his weapon into him. This wounded Tremor but due to his mutated, cybernetically enhanced condition the damage was only minor. Spawn only saw part of what had happened and attacked David, severely injuring his leg and enraging Tremor. This led to a falling out between the duo and what has been a very uneasy tension between them since.

The character has been the basis for several action figures.

Tremor has been notably absent from the book for a very long time. This is most likely because of the legal issues surrounding the Tony Twist character, since Tremor's role in the book is to chase after Twist. Tremor made a cameo as a new member of the Image comics team, The Brigade, and more information on this part of his usage in comics is being investigated.

Tremor supposedly made a brief cameo in the latest Spawn arc, however, the Tremor that appeared to Spawn while he was being tortured by Thamuz was instead a low-level demon under the guise of an illusion caused by Thamuz' magic. He later shows up in the Jim Dowing Saga as a normal man. He appears in Spawn #297 and the King Spawn series.

== See also ==
- Spawn villains
