= Hellspawn =

Comic book series

- The cover art of Hellspawn #1 by Ashley Wood.

Publication information
- Publisher: Image Comics
- Genre: Horror; Superhero
- Publication date: 2000–2003
- No. of issues: 16

Creative team
- Created by: Todd McFarlane
- Written by: Brian Michael Bendis; Steve Niles
- Artist(s): Ashley Wood; Ben Templesmith

Hellspawn is an American comic book series published by Image Comics. Inspired by Spawn, Hellspawn is darker and more atmospheric than the former, and frequently deals with disturbing subject matter. It originally featured writer Brian Michael Bendis and artist Ashley Wood.

The first issue of Hellspawn was published in August 2000. Steve Niles occasionally supplemented the writing and Ben Templesmith the same for the art. With issue #11 Niles and Templesmith took over as the comic's regular writer/artist team. The final issue was published in April 2003.
