= Spawn: Armageddon =

2003 video game

- North American PlayStation 2 cover art
- Developer: Point of View
- Publishers: NA: Namco Hometek; EU: Electronic Arts; JP: Namco
- Producer: Jon Sieker
- Designer: Edward Linley
- Programmers: Steven Lashower; Kyle Radue; Hari Khalsa
- Artist: Ivan Enriquez
- Composers: Rik Schaffer; Margaret Tang; Jason Freedman
- Platforms: PlayStation 2 GameCube; Xbox
- Release: NA: November 21, 2003; PAL: March 12, 2004; JP: June 3, 2004 (PS2)
- Genres: Action-adventure, hack and slash
- Mode: Single-player

Spawn: Armageddon is a 2003 action-adventure game released for the PlayStation 2, Xbox and GameCube video game consoles. It is inspired by issues 1 through 99 of the Spawn comic book series.

== Gameplay ==
Gameplay centers on fast-paced and stylish combat, where players collect valuable breakable items, Souls, Technique points, comic covers, Time, and Ranks. Spawn's primary weapon is the Agony Axe, a formidable blade formed from his cape, capable of cutting through any demon. He is also equipped with his signature chains, which deliver precise and rapid attacks. Additionally, Spawn can find firearms to combat stronger demons. He wields various hellish powers, including the necroplasm, a mystical substance central to his abilities. The game includes upgrade mechanics, requiring Spawn to gather demon souls to purchase ammunition, enhance weapons, and increase maximum health or necroplasm capacity.

== Plot ==
Spawn stands on a decrepit rooftop in New York City. He receives flashbacks of his former life, and his betrayal by Jason Wynn. A green flash of light tears through the city, signaling the demon's war against the angels in battle known as Armageddon. Knocked off the rooftops, Spawn takes to the street to answer the call and get revenge.

Various characters from the Spawn comic book are featured in the game.

== Development ==
Spawn creator Todd McFarlane directed the game's production.

Marilyn Manson's song "Use Your Fist and Not Your Mouth" from the 2003 album The Golden Age of Grotesque is used for the intro video and credits.

== Reception ==
Reception

Aggregate score
Aggregator	Score		
Aggregator	GameCube	PS2	Xbox
Metacritic	61/100	56/100	57/100

Review scores
Publication	Score		
Publication	GameCube	PS2	Xbox
Electronic Gaming Monthly	4.83/10	4.83/10	4.83/10
Game Informer	N/A	6.5/10	6.5/10
GamePro	N/A	2.5/5	2.5/5
GameSpot	5.6/10	5.6/10	5.8/10
GameSpy	2/5	2/5	2/5
GameZone	7/10	7.5/10	7.8/10
IGN	7.4/10	7.7/10	7.7/10
Nintendo Power	3.5/5	N/A	N/A
Official U.S. PlayStation Magazine	N/A	1.5/5	N/A
Official Xbox Magazine (US)	N/A	N/A	6.5/10

The game received mixed reviews on all platforms according to video game review aggregator Metacritic. The action was criticized for being basic and repetitive, and the combos described as "lame".
