= Spawn: In the Demon's Hand =

- Developer: Capcom
- Publishers: WW: Capcom; EU: Eidos Interactive (DC)
- Platforms: Arcade, Dreamcast
- Release: Arcade: JP: January 2000; NA: February 01, 2000; Dreamcast: JP: August 10, 2000; NA: October 18, 2000; EU: January 19, 2001; AU: March 8, 2001
- Genre: Fighting
- Modes: Single-player, multiplayer
- Arcade system: Sega NAOMI

Spawn: In the Demon's Hand (スポーン イン ザ デーモンズ ハンド, Supōn In za Dēmonzu Hando) is a 3D fighting game developed and published by Capcom for the Dreamcast and arcade in 2000. It is based on the comic book character Spawn created by Todd McFarlane and produced by Image Comics. A port was planned for the PlayStation 2 as a launch title but was later canceled.

== Storyline ==
Al Simmons was a military operative who was murdered by his superior, Jason Wynn, then sent to Hell for his previous work as an assassin. Five years after his death, Simmons makes a deal with the demon Malebolgia to resurrect him from death as a hellspawn so that he could see his wife, Wanda, again. However, he soon finds out that his wife, in the five years that he was dead, had married his best friend, Terry Fitzgerald.

== Gameplay ==
This game includes three modes:

- Boss Rush Mode - The main mode of the game. Players must defeat bosses in each stage within the time limit to earn points.
- Team Battle Mode - Players must defeat the opponent team to win.
- Battle Royale - Players must defeat all enemies to win.

The game features thirty-seven playable characters overall, including eleven main playable characters from the arcade release as well as multiple hidden characters.

== Reception ==
Reception

Aggregate score
Aggregator	Score	
Aggregator	Arcade	Dreamcast
Metacritic	N/A	62/100

Review scores
Publication	Score	
Publication	Arcade	Dreamcast
AllGame	2/5	3/5
CNET Gamecenter	N/A	7/10
Edge	N/A	4/10
Electronic Gaming Monthly	N/A	8/10
Famitsu	N/A	31/40
Game Informer	7.75/10	6.5/10
GameFan	N/A	75% (Note: Three critics of GameFan gave the Dreamcast version each a score of 68, 79, and 77.)
GameRevolution	N/A	B−
GameSpot	N/A	5.6/10
IGN	N/A	(US) 6.8/10 (JP) 6/10
Next Generation	N/A	1/5

The Dreamcast version received "mixed" reviews according to video game review aggregator Metacritic. It is judged as the best Spawn game, although it did not achieve high rates in GameSpot and IGN, especially due to camera and AI problems. Greg Orlando of NextGen gave it a negative review, saying, "Lack of decorum allows us only to comment that this game would more aptly be subtitled 'From Capcom's Rectum.'" In Japan, however, Famitsu gave it a score of 31 out of 40. Vicious Sid of GamePro said of the game, "Though it had plenty of promise, Spawn is ruined by its awkward controls. Ultimately, only Spawn fans and Dreamcast action buffs should rent this hindered hell-raiser." (Note: GamePro gave the Dreamcast version two 4/5 scores for graphics and sound, 2.5/5 for control, and 3/5 for fun factor.)
