= Spawn/WildC.A.T.S. =

Comic Book Series

- Cover of the first issue

Publication information
- Publisher: Image Comics; Wildstorm
- Publication date: 1996
- No. of issues: 4

Creative team
- Written by: Alan Moore
- Penciller: Scott Clark
- Inker: Sal Regla
- Letterer: Tom Orzechowski
- Colorist: Olyoptics
- Editor: Michael Heisler

Spawn/WildC.A.T.S. is an American comic book mini-series published by Image Comics, crossing over Todd McFarlane's Spawn and Jim Lee's WildC.A.T.S.

== Synopsis ==
Future versions of the present-day WILDC.A.T.S. cause trouble when an assassination plan is implemented against the current Spawn. It is revealed that the future Spawn has become a tyrannical murderer. Spawn rebelled and killed Malebolgia and became the monarch of Hell referring to himself as the Ipsissimus. Both teams of WildC.A.T.S. and the present-Spawn team up to try to save the future from this mad demi-god.

The Ipsissimus has sent the demons of Hell on Earth including the Phlebiac Brothers as the "law enforcement". The WildC.A.T.S. of the present slowly learn that Voodoo and Warblade are dead, Maul is the servant of the Ipsissimus, Void, Caitlin Fairchild, Freefall and Sarah Rainmaker are some of the Ipsissimus' many sex slaves (all of whom were former superheroines), and the immortal Lord Emp is tortured continuously like Prometheus.

The WildC.A.T.S. assault on the Ipsissimus is surprisingly met with little difficulty. When confronting the Ipsissimus the heroes are quickly brushed off by the gigantic demon. Spawn angrily steals the amulet that the Ipsissimus wears, presuming that it is the source of the Ipsissimus power, but the Ipsissimus then sends Spawn and the future Zealot back to the 90s.

The Ipsissimus reveals that he knew the WildC.A.T.S. were coming as he had lived through the events as Spawn and was inspired when he took the amulet (from himself) to become the Ipsissimus, revealing a predestination paradox. However, the old Zealot now known as Tapestry helps to end the cycle by revealing the face of the new Zealot to the corrupted Spawn who realizes that Zealot is an adult Cyan, the daughter whom Al Simmons could have had. Shocked by this he gives the amulet to Cyan, undoing the apocalyptic future.
