= Shadows of Spawn =

Manga adaptation of the Spawn character

- Cover of the first issue
- Genre: Action, Adventure, Superhero
- Manga
- Written by: Juzo Tokoro
- Published by: MediaWorks
- English publisher: NA: Image Comics
- Magazine: Dengeki Comic Gao!
- Original run: 1998 – 1999
- Volumes: 3
- Related works
- Todd McFarlane's Spawn

Shadows of Spawn is a licensed Japanese manga adaptation of Todd McFarlane's American Spawn comic series, written and drawn by Juzo Tokoro. It was originally printed in Japan from 1998 to 1999 in the monthly manga magazine Dengeki Comic Gao!, published by MediaWorks. The series retains a number of elements of the original American series, but also exhibits a number of differences from it as well.

== Background ==
Teenager Ken Kurosawa is a Japanese-American freelance martial artist turned street thug, who hires himself out for money in order to care for his sickly younger sister Mariko, after their parents died. Having made a name for himself on the streets of Los Angeles as a singlehanded muscleman who could win street fights and gang battles to any who hired him under his favor, Ken was known as the elite street mercenary Double K. After promising his sister to be with her for her birthday, Ken is murdered via a car bombing by a street gang whom he backed out of a prior deal with. Seven years later, with no memories of his prior life and at the exact location of his death, Ken is brought back as a Hellspawn.

The new Spawn, living in South California, takes refuge in an abandoned church. He discovers his sister has overcome her illness and is slowly becoming a rising Hollywood teen actress. His greatest desire is to protect her, even after death. Ironically, she is now the target of many supernatural creatures because of that very desire.

== Characters ==
- Ken Kurosawa: Once a skilled martial artist, Ken turned his trade as a street thug to work for gangs to help pay medical costs for his sister, Mariko. He is killed when a bomb explodes in his car, after switching to another gang for more money. He is compared to Al Simmons by Violator when he is not around, and is said to be extremely powerful by various characters.
- Mariko Kurosawa: After the death of her older brother, Ken, she became better from her illness and became a movie star after moving in with her aunt and uncle. She has been saved by Ken twice, although she doesn't know who her savior really is. She perceives her rescues as murders, because the people who were trying to kill her are people she knew.
- Clown/Violator: The Violator is a minion of Hell, and is loyal to Malebolgia, even though he swears to rebel against the devil. He leaves for New York to train Al Simmons part-way through the first manga, and returns smaller than his original size, due to Malebolgia's doing.
- Beezlebub: Preferring to be called "Bee", she is supposedly the little sister of Malebolgia. She acts as Ken's mentor during Violator's absence. She taunts both Ken and Violator almost every chance she gets, but has well-intended comments about Ken when he's not around.
- Malebolgia: Playing a very small role, the devil himself only makes one or two appearances in the manga.
- Tremor II: A nod to Al Simmons' own Tremor, Tremor II is a Los Angeles mob boss, infused with psychoplasm. He can only grunt or roar, until he melds with Terry Jones.
- Mikaela: A nod to Simmons' Angela, Mikaela is a freelance spawn-hunter. After Ken saves her from Violator, she wants to fight and kill him, claiming he stole her dignity. She flies away, wanting a rematch, until she shows up to save Ken from Scourge, a demon summoned from hell.
- Cheveyo: A mentor-like Spawn who has resisted Malebolgia for over five hundred years. Based upon the McFarlane toy, "Zombie Spawn". He thinks little of the minions of Hell and tries to destroy Kurosawa in their first meeting. He does not seem to have the familiar mask of Hellspawns, but instead has rotting, hanging flesh.
- Caleb: An 18th-Century pirate, Caleb is a vain, female Spawn. Her "need" for psychoplasm continues to grow as she gets older, as she sucks Spawns dry from their power. She intentionally tries to kill herself in a battle with Cheveyo. She also does not seem to wear a spawn's mask. She has distinct markings on her face, but her mouth is clearly visible.
- Mangler: A wolf-like Spawn. It is unknown what time period it is from, however, Cheveyo explains that "even animals don't escape from Malebolgia's doing". It can communicate with Kurosawa through telepathy. It does not wear a mask, but has markings near its eyes that seem to remind the reader of its status.
- Ells: A women who was jealous of Mariko's success and was transformed by Violator into a demon until she was stopped by Ken.
- Toshio: A young man who becomes the bodyguard of Mariko who he develops feelings for.
- Al Simmons/Spawn: The protagonist of the main series makes a cameo and references a few times.

== Plot ==
The manga also introduces three other Spawns who are also active, and who have been on Earth for some time. The first is actually a Spawn introduced in the McFarlane toyline, Zombie Spawn, who has been "alive" for about five hundred years, doing his best to resist Malebolgia and give as much grief as possible to the lord of the eighth circle of Hell. A female spawn from the 19th century is also introduced, as is a creature which may or may not be a wolf, resurrected and transformed into a 'werewolf' Spawn. Unlike Kurosawa and Simmons, these Spawns do not wear the now iconic armor which is associated with the character, though the female pirate spawn and the werewolf spawn both have markings on their face which are the same as those on the cowl of the Spawn mask. The Zombie Spawn does not wear any version of the markings or armor at all.

There are several references to the Al Simmons incarnation of the character, who is implied to be active simultaneously with Kurosawa. It is heavily implied that Ken returned to Earth at the exact same time as did Al Simmons, as many events parallel events in the original comic. Like Al Simmons, Kurosawa initially has no memories, and is confronted almost immediately after awakening by the Clown. Clown briefly leaves the manga, replaced by a faerie-like creature calling herself Beelzebub. He returns as the Violator.

There are, however, no references to the 'Youngbloods', a group of heroes that Image comics produced, and which Simmons was mistakenly believed to be by at least three to six people in the beginnings of the American comic. Simmons himself does not appear in any way in the manga, except for a one-panel shot of his arm after the battle with Violator. Malebolgia is also briefly shown in some panels. A new angel is introduced in the manga as well: Mikaela, who appeared to be designed in homage to Angela.

Only three volumes of the series were released; the Japanese edition was canceled on a cliffhanger. The manga is not intended to have any direct relationship with the normal comic continuity.

One other key difference between the original comic and the manga version of Spawn, was that the Hellspawns in the manga are said to not die off completely and return to Hell, as was supposedly going to happen to Simmons at first, but rather they would be recharged and sent back to Earth, potentially losing more and more of themselves as each time happened, supposedly growing ever stronger, but also becoming just flat out evil, or else simply losing touch with that which made them originally wish to return to life to begin with. Cheveyo is the eldest active Spawn out of the four in the manga, and Cogliostro himself, as he is five hundred years old. This is another key difference, because in the American book, A Spawn is only born once every four hundred years and they lose power eventually, but none of them are supposed to be able to live the full four hundred years between each birth, let alone a century past it. Since Kurosawa is brought back to Earth seven years after his death, he apparently is 'born' as a Spawn literally simultaneously with Al Simmons, as, again, events in the American comic book, at least partially, had an effect on a character in the manga (namely Clown/Violator), and thus the Spawn manga may be viewed to be an alternate universe that has unofficial, but still partially visible ties to the original material.

On a side note, images of the reporters in the American Spawn comic can be seen on TV screens when Kurosawa is studying with Cheveyo.

== Reception ==
In Jason Thompson's online appendix to Manga: The Complete Guide, he describes Shadows of Spawn as having "crude" art and ultimately being a "tedious read".
