= Spawn: The Eternal =

1997 video game

- Developer: Sony Interactive Studios America
- Publisher: Sony Computer Entertainment
- Producers: Paul Willman; Russell Shanks
- Programmers: Brandon Bogle; Tim Monk
- Composers: Rick Patterson; Rex Baca; Chuck Carr; Joel Copen; Kip Martin
- Platform: PlayStation
- Release: NA: December 9, 1997; EU: April 10, 1998
- Genres: Beat 'em up; adventure; fighting
- Mode: Single-player

Spawn: The Eternal is a 1997 beat 'em up developed by Sony Interactive Studios America and published by Sony Computer Entertainment for the PlayStation. It is based on the comic book character Spawn created by Todd McFarlane and published by Image Comics. The gamer performs as the recently-killed Al Simmons, who is morphed into the titular superhero by the devil, Malebolgia, to traverse three time periods to prepare him for a battle between the two. The game switches between a Tomb Raider-esque adventure game for traversal and a Street Fighter-style side-view fighting game for encountering opponents.

Sony Interactive Studios America, who had only developed sports and racing titles, started developing a Spawn video game in early 1995. In 1996, the design was refurnished into something with the style of the Tomb Raider franchse. Upon its 1997 release, Spawn: The Eternal was considered by some gaming publications one of the worst all-time video games, widely panned for its simple and monotonous gameplay, sluggish controls, and ugly and overly pixelated graphics.

== Gameplay ==
Spawn: The Eternal is a beat 'em up consisting of 15 maze-like levels. The player takes on the role of Al Simmons, a former assassin who, after getting murdered by an associate, makes a deal with Malebolgia, the devil from the Eight Sphere of Hell, to reviving him; he will be part of the Devil's Own Army and come back to Earth as the titular superhero. Spawn, to free himself from this fate, goes through three different time periods named Street, Savage and Medieval to get to Tower of Hell to defeat Malebolgia, changing his costume to suit the time period.

In each stage, Spawn searches for and collects hints, tools, health, and keys to doors leading to other sections in a third-person adventure exploration mode a la Tomb Raider. Most of the stages consist of one large flat floor, with a small amount of large platform gaps and stairways to other floors. In the adventure mode, Spawn, with tank controls, can run and jump, with a punch-kick combination used for breaking through doors and crates among other obstacles.

Spawn also fights opponents, including bosses that are also other established villains such as Overtkill, the Redeemer, Violator, Vandalizer and Vaporizer. In these instances, the game switches to a side-view fighting game mode a la Street Fighter, Tekken and Battle Arena Toshinden. This deviates from the tradition of other adventure games where enemies are fought in the same third-person item-collecting framework. The addition of exploration was also unusual for fighting games up to that point. Spawn only puts on his iconic cape and chains in the fighting mode, and can kick, punch, pull off combos of the two, rip off the opponent's arm and hit with it, and utilize magic Power Orbs he collects in the adventure mode, such as fireballs; however, he cannot jump.

When played on a CD player, the disc plays a lengthy audio interview with Todd McFarlane.

== Development ==
Development on the game began in early 1995 at Sony Interactive Studios America, who was known at the time for sport games and racing games such as Jet Moto and Twisted Metal. The game's original format was scrapped in 1996 so that it could be redesigned in the same style as the innovative Tomb Raider, leading to the development cycle being stretched out to two years. A release date was announced for August 1997 to be released around the same time the Spawn film was released in theaters, but pushed back to December due to further delays.

All of the character animations were recorded at Sony's in-house motion capture studio in San Diego.

During development, the team regularly sent unfinished copies of the game to Todd McFarlane and his right-hand man Terry Fitzgerald, who would review the game and provide feedback.

== Reception ==
Reception

Review scores
Publication	Score
Computer and Video Games	1/5
Electronic Gaming Monthly	4.5/10 3/10 4/10 4.5/10
Game Informer	4.75/10
Game Players	3/10
GameRevolution	C−
GameSpot	1.8/10
IGN	2/10
Next Generation	1/5
Official U.S. PlayStation Magazine	2/5
Play	49%

Upon its appearance on store shelves, Spawn: The Eternal was declared by critics one of the worst all-time video games, overall and in the categories of film tie-ins and PS1 games. The game continued to be considered one of the worst video games of all-time in later decades, including for comic book superhero video games. The game massively disappointed critics due to the high quality of the comics and its media adaptations and toys.

The graphics were considered by several critics to be ugly, filled with pop-ups, repetitive and sloppy texturing, and excessive pixelation and blockiness. The texture mapping's pixelation, blockiness and amount of detail was noted by GameSpot and UK's Play magazine to make the positions of characters hard to decipher. IGN and the UK's Play magazine perceived Spawn's appearance as similar to an ape.

Spawn: The Eternal's overall gameplay was condemned as monotonous, as the player traversed to the next enemy to combat before wandering again to do the same. All the opponents were reportedly defeated by a constant repeat of kicking then sidestepping.

GameSpot cited poor controls, buggy graphics, dull levels, and a camera which moves far too slow to keep up with the player character. IGN complained of grainy textures, simplistic combat, overly easy puzzles, and general lack of challenge. Next Generation likewise said the puzzles are simplistic to the point of being mindless, and found the transition from over-the-shoulder to side-view perspective when entering combat to be confusing. They also criticized the ugly visuals. Shawn Smith of Electronic Gaming Monthly praised the lighting effects, animated textures, and music, but concluded that the gameplay makes Spawn: The Eternal unlikable, and his three co-reviewers were much more negative about the game. Kelly Rickards razed the muddy graphics, awkward fighting engine, and mindless enemy A.I., and Joe Fielder commented, "It fails miserably as both a fighting game and explorative actioneer, with a weak fighting engine, horrible 3-D camera, choppy control and bad graphics. It ranks right down there with Sirtech's Excalibur 2555 and ASC's Perfect Weapon."

GamePro panned the game for the needlessly complex and under-responsive controls, the weak fight music, the repetitive gameplay, and the fact that Spawn only wears his chains and cape during fights. The reviewer gave it 3.5 out of 5 for graphics, 2.5 for control, and 2.0 for both sound and fun factor. Ultra Game Players stated that "Textures are ugly and repetitive, and the resolution is so blocky and pixelated, you'll find yourself longing for the days of eight-bit games."
