= Spawn (character) =

Image Comics superhero

- Spawn on the cover of Spawn #1. Art by Todd McFarlane.

Publication information
- Publisher: Image Comics
- First appearance: Spawn #1 (May 1992)
- Created by: Todd McFarlane

In-story information
- Alter ego: Albert Francis "Al" Simmons
- Species: Hellspawn; Human (formerly)
- Team affiliations: CIA; Secret Service; U.S. Marine Corps; Force Reconnaissance; The Scorched
- Notable aliases: Spawn, The One, Hellspawn, Spawny, King Spawn
- Abilities: Immortality (to an extent, powers drain when used and full drainage of powers results in a second death); Ability to draw power by feeding off the sins of others; Superhuman strength, speed, agility, reflexes, stamina, endurance, and durability; Healing factor; Necroplasm manipulation; Flight; Intangibility; Matter manipulation and transmutation; Shapeshifting; Time manipulation; Psychic abilities; Invisibility; Size-shifting; Animal empathy; Teleportation; Use of K7-Leetha, a sentient costume that can provide nearly unlimited weaponry and protection; Highly skilled tactician, martial artist, swordsman, marksman, athlete and acrobat

Albert Francis "Al" Simmons, better known as Spawn, is an antihero appearing in a monthly comic book of the same name published by American company Image Comics, as well as in a number of films, television series, and video game adaptations set in the Image Universe. Created by Todd McFarlane, Spawn first appeared in Spawn #1 (May 1992).

Simmons is a government assassin who died and went to Hell for his crimes against humanity. Following a deal with Malebolgia, Simmons is given new life as a Hellspawn and the chance to see his wife Wanda once again. The deal is revealed to be a trick, as Simmons is brought back to life five years after his death, unrecognizable to his wife and missing many of his memories. With little other choice, Simmons adopts his new hell-inspired identity as Spawn in an effort to atone for his past sins and use his newfound powers for good.

The series has spun off several other comic books, including Angela, Curse of the Spawn, Sam & Twitch, and the Japanese manga Shadows of Spawn. Spawn was adapted into a 1997 feature film and portrayed by Michael Jai White, an HBO animated series lasting from 1997 until 1999 and voiced by Keith David, a series of action figures from McFarlane Toys, and an upcoming reboot film starring Jamie Foxx and Jeremy Renner. The character appears in annual compilations, mini-series specials written by guest authors and artists, and numerous crossover storylines in other comic books, including Savage Dragon and three DC Comics crossovers with Batman.

== Publication history ==
The Spawn prototype, designed by a teenaged McFarlane in 1977

Todd McFarlane's hobby of drawing began at an early age, and he created the character Spawn when he was 16, spending "countless hours" perfecting the appearance of each component of the character's visual design.

Spawn saw a decent amount of popularity upon its initial release in the early 1990s. Comic book collecting was growing exponentially at the time of ‘’Spawn’s’’ release, fueled by the speculator boom looking for the next hot book that would jump in value after its release. McFarlane had enjoyed superstar status among comic fans with his work on Spider-Man, which had featured McFarlane's name prominently as both writer and artist. McFarlane's subsequent break with Marvel Comics and the formation of Image Comics was seen by many as a sea-change event, changing the way in which comics were produced. Wizard, in May 2008, rated "The Launch of Image Comics" as #1 in the list of events that rocked the comic industry from 1991 to 2008.

The first issue of Spawn was very popular, selling 1.7 million copies. During Spawn's second year of publication, Wizard noted that "The top dog at Image is undoubtedly Todd McFarlane's Spawn, which, without the added marketing push of fancy covers, poly bagged issues, or card inserts has become the best-selling comic on a consistent basis that is currently being published." Sales slumped around the time of Spawn #25, but by Spawn #45 it was again a consistently strong seller.

The popularity of the franchise peaked with the 1997 Spawn feature film, the pre-release publicity for which helped make Spawn the top-selling comic book for May 1997; in addition, the spin-off Curse of the Spawn #9 came in at fifth best-selling in that same month. However, the film was only a mild commercial success and failed to start a film franchise based on the character. A 2008 issue, Spawn #174, ranked 99th best-selling comic of the month with retail orders of 22,667. In October 2008, issue #185, which marked both a new creative direction and Todd McFarlane's return to the book, sold out at the distribution level and received a second printing. By issue #191 in May 2009, with estimated sales of 19,803 copies, Spawn had dropped below Top 100 titles sold monthly to comic shops as reported by Diamond Comic Distributors. As of September 2010, Spawn was ranked at #115 in the top 300 sales figures chart reported by Diamond Comic Distributors. On the day of its release in 2011, issue #200 sold out. This issue featured work by Greg Capullo, David Finch, Michael Golden, Jim Lee, Rob Liefeld, Marc Silvestri, Danny Miki, and Ashley Wood. A second printing was released the next month. It received a negative review from IGN. Spawn's sales continued to decline despite a series of homage covers designed to renew interest, ultimately hitting its lowest sales number of under 12,000 retail orders in Spawn #243.

Spawn began a resurgence in popularity as the title approached its 300th issue, with the title once again becoming a fixture in Diamond's Top 100. The 300th issue made Spawn the longest-running independent comic book series of all time.

In 2021, McFarlane expanded his Spawn Universe with 3 new ongoing titles and a one-shot titled Spawn Universe No. 1 which sold 211,000 copies. The first spinoff, titled King Spawn, was released in August 2021 having pre-order sales of 497,000 copies and total sales of 520,000 copies. The next title, released in October 2021, Gunslinger Spawn sold 385,000 copies, which made it the biggest launch for a new ongoing superhero title in 25 years. The final new series, The Scorched, was released in January 2022 and sold more than 270,000 copies.

McFarlane also stated in an interview that he wants Spawn to outlive him the same way characters like Spider-Man, Batman, Superman, and even Disney have endured past their creators.

== Fictional character biography ==
=== Origin ===
Born in Detroit, Michigan, Albert Francis "Al" Simmons is the second of three siblings. His father, Bernard Simmons, is a traveling salesman, and his mother, Esther Simmons, is a devil worshipper. Al Simmons eventually becomes a highly decorated officer in the U.S. Marine Corps, attaining the rank of Lieutenant Colonel while serving with Force Recon. He later joins the Secret Service, becomes a high-ranking official, and is recruited by the Central Intelligence Agency. Simmons later joins the U.S. Security Group, an umbrella agency encompassing the CIA, NSA, and NSC, commanded by Director Jason Wynn, and becomes a formidable assassin.

During a mission in Botswana, Wynn grows tired of Simmons' increasing sense of morality. As a result of this, Simmons' friend and partner Bruce Stinson (codename Chapel) is secretly hired to kill him. Simmons is burned to death and sent to Hell. Making a deal with the devil Malebolgia, Simmons agrees to become a Hellspawn. After swearing to serve Malebolgia, he is allowed to see his wife Wanda one last time. Malebolgia returns Simmons to the living realm with a severely burned body, and a demonic guardian named the Violator.

Simmons, now a Hellspawn, returns to Earth with a lack of understanding of his previous identity. He wanders in a state of confusion with only vague memories of his former life, including his own name, his marriage to Wanda and the fact that he was once deceased. Spawn occasionally experiences painful flashbacks and eventually remembers his deal with Malebolgia. Using CIA files, he tracks down his wife and finds her married to his former best friend Terry, with whom she has a daughter named Cyan. He realizes five years have passed since his death.

Spawn runs into a fellow Hellspawn, who informs him that his powers are fueled by necroplasm and that once they are depleted, he will return to Hell. Not wanting to return to Hell, Spawn attempts to find a new purpose in life while using as little power as possible. Spawn is thrust into several antihero adventures, taking down street gangs and organized crime in New York City. Battling against various criminals, Spawn finds a new purpose in stopping evil.

=== Early history ===
In his early battles, Spawn faces street thugs and gangs, becoming a dark, sadistic antihero, and brutally murders the pedophile and child murderer Billy Kincaid. Spawn gains the attention of police detectives Sam Burke and Twitch Williams, and becomes "King of Rat City", a gathering of alleys populated by the city's homeless. There he meets Cogliostro, who knows much about Spawn and becomes his mentor.

Spawn is hunted by the warrior angel Angela, who hunts Hellspawns for sport, and battles the cyborg mob enforcer Overt-Kill. He fights the angelic warrior Anti-Spawn, also known as the Redeemer, who is really Jason Wynn.

==== First metamorphosis ====
Following a conflict with the Redeemer, Spawn's costume undergoes a significant upgrade. The upgraded suit features a new cape and chains, which are able to change shape. Additionally, the boots and gloves are replaced with spikes. After this transformation, the suit starts feeding off souls.

After this, Tony Twist sends a reprogrammed Overt-Kill after Terry, and Spawn is forced to reveal his identity while saving his friend. A well-placed shot from Twitch Williams brings down Overt-Kill. Spawn is part of Angela's trial and later travels to the South and encounters the KKK and an abusive father of two boys. After returning to New York, he is attacked by a new Redeemer, causing his costume to evolve once more. After another encounter with the Curse, the suit sends him to Hell. Malebolgia later sends him back with full control of the suit.

=== War of Heaven and Hell ===
==== Battle for life ====
As Spawn struggles to find a way to regain control, he notices that the attacks are coming from both Heaven and Hell. Due to increasing attacks, Spawn begins to lose himself to evil. With help from the Heap, an emissary of the Greenworld, Spawn manages to regain his goal. Greenworld, a dimension whose power is equal to both Heaven and Hell, gives new powers to Spawn to better understand the world and its people. These powers seem to give him control of all of the elements in the world.

Spawn is later attacked by Urizen. After recovering, Spawn learns the Greenworld has imbued him with a gift, which he uses to contain Urizen by splitting the ground and imprisoning him inside the earth.

After his battle, Spawn learns Malebolgia had caused Urizen's release in an attempt to start Armageddon and conquer the forces of Heaven. Spawn and Angela journey to Hell to stop him. During the battle, Angela mortally wounds Malebolgia, who kills her in retaliation. Consumed with anger, Spawn takes Malebolgia's head.

==== King of Hell ====
Upon killing Malebolgia, Spawn learns Hell's throne is rightfully his when it is offered to him by the demon Mammon. After initially refusing, Spawn deliberates with Cogliostro and decides to turn Hell into a new paradise. During this act, Cogliostrio reveals he is Cain, who was the first person to go to Hell, having murdered his brother in envy. His true goal had always been to take over Hell using a Hellspawn. Having betrayed Spawn, Cogliostrio takes the throne but restores his former student's human form as a parting gift.

On Earth, Spawn meets Nyx, a young Wiccan that helps him regain his suit. Using trickery, Mammon usurps Nyx's control over Spawn's union with his suit and removing all of Al's memories. Amnesiac, Spawn wanders the Earth. He releases a group of angels called the Forgotten and stays neutral in the war between Heaven and Hell. He discovers Mammon is a member of the Fallen who was sent to Hell.

==== Spawn in Armageddon ====
Spawn regains his memories thanks to the power of the Greenworld. His suit evolves once more and seems one with his body. However, as time progresses, he begins to hate himself. Having been rejected by Heaven and Hell, he now lives in an abandoned warehouse as maggots and other insects crawl inside his body. He returns to the Dead Zone, although a Hellspawn would not be welcomed there. Upon entering, Spawn is confronted by the Disciple, who tears his brain out, throws his heart into the Greenworld, and his body into Hell. Mammon captures and tortures Spawn to learn his secrets.

When Spawn's heart falls to the Greenworld, a soul is freed. Chris meets with his mother and travels to Hell along with Sam Burke and Twitch Williams to rescue Spawn from Mammon. Spawn escapes and returns to Earth, where signs of Armageddon begin to appear. Looking for a way to stop it, Spawn discovers Wanda's twin children are responsible. He stops them from killing their entire family but cannot destroy them. Zera reveals Jake is God and Katie is Satan.

Due to their hatred of each other and constant fighting, the Mother removed their powers and positions and sent them to Earth. She tells him he cannot stop Armageddon. However, he has the potential to gain the power of a god and preserve the human race.

He has to eat a piece of Forbidden Fruit from the Garden of Eden to gain such power. She tells Spawn he must fight against The Disciple. It is revealed there are 12 Disciples, each one representing one of Jesus. Spawn's power is also weakened because demons cannot enter the Garden. However, with guidance from Cyan, he defeats every Disciple but Judas, who Cyan tells Spawn not to kill. Judas then stabs Spawn in the heart but the Mother gives Spawn a piece of the fruit and resurrects him. He gains an angelic form and greater power.

Spawn returns to Earth, which has been destroyed by Four Horsemen; angels and demons are waiting to fight their final battle. After defeating Zera, Spawn finds dead warriors of Heaven, one of whom is Granny Blake, who is betrayed by her faith. Spawn battles the forces of Satan and God, destroying the forces of Heaven, Hell and humanity. He is then killed by the two, who then fight alone on Earth.

Spawn comes back and resurrects everyone with the knowledge of what happened. He leaves God and Satan to fight in their own little world and closes the doors to Heaven, Hell, and Earth. He asks to be turned into a human by the Mother but later asks to once again become a Hellspawn after remembering that, prior to his first death as Al Simmons, he had beaten Wanda and caused her to miscarry their child. This causes him to conclude he has always been a monster and does not deserve to be human again.

=== Back in the mortal world ===
==== New Clown ====
After a series of odd murders, Spawn finds the Clown has come back, possessing the body of mortal Barney Saunders, who is having an affair with a woman named Wilma Barbara. Spawn destroys and remakes the world. Saunders is rescued by the Clown so he can use his body. He then brings out the dark urges inside the tenants of an apartment building and uses this to form a doorway to Hell and bring back his brothers. However, before he can form a portal, Wilma shows up and his love for her allows Saunders to take back control. Intending to close the portal, he goes through it, and takes Wilma with him due to being angry over her leaving him in the chute.

Zera reappears as a head in a jar. Spawn is summoned by a voodoo priestess named Mambo Suzanne. Zera attempts to take over Nyx's body and fights Spawn. However, she is killed when Suzanne throws Zera's head into the street. Nyx is freed and she and Spawn become friends again.

Ab and Zab create a Hell where visitors are forced to view their deepest fears, which are eaten by demons called sin-eaters. While confronting Ab and Zab, Spawn is faced with his own sin against Wanda and his unborn child. Unable to break free from the guilt, Spawn is parasitized by a sin eater. When Nyx interferes, he breaks the sin eater's illusion. Spawn breaks all the other's illusions and comes across Al Simmons' brother Richard.

Spawn decides to allow Richard to feel his sins. Mammon, as Mr. Malefick, had put an influence on Al and Richard Simmons. Only Marc Simmons saved himself from Mammon but was unable to help the others. Richard calls his brothers to help him save the drug dealer's life. Al, instead of calling an ambulance, pulls the knife from Weasel's body and kills him with it. Mammon appears, sending the brothers home while he hides the drug dealer's body.

Nyx and Spawn kill the last sin eater and Spawn discovers Richard cannot remember their parents due to a spell placed by Mammon. Wanting to know more about them, Spawn finds their home under a spell placed by Mammon. His mother planned with Mammon to create the strongest Hellspawn. Al is then given a journal by his father that reveals his ancestor came across a Hellspawn in the past known as the Gunslinger Spawn.

==== Morana ====
There, Spawn speaks with Wanda, who cannot forgive Al for the death of their child. However, she still loves the man inside Spawn. Trying to take out Cyan's knife, Spawn somehow suppresses the suit. Cyan and Nyx appear, and K7-Leetha appears and takes over Nyx. Now controlled by the K7, Nyx tries to kill Cyan and Wanda but is halted by Mammon. The entire group goes to a castle, where Mammon explains his plan to make a perfect Hellspawn. He wants the Rapture to occur so Satan, God, and Malebolgia will be gone. He reveals his perfect Hellspawn is Al and Wanda's miscarried child, Morana.

After washing herself in virgin's blood, Morana bonds with the uniform and gets ready to consume her parents' souls. Cyan taps into her powers and goes to the future. She talks with an old woman who gives her a message for Al. Returning, she has Spawn summon the last twelve members of the Legion, who are beaten by Morana. Mammon insults Al and disowns Morana. Cyan tells Nyx a spell to trap Mammon and Morana. It works, both demons are sealed away, and the others return home. Al jumps into another dimension to be reborn as a weapon against both Heaven and Hell.

==== Endgame ====
Spawn is soon ready to enter the human dimension. Making his way to the alleys, he blows his head off. Meanwhile, Jim Downing, an amnesiac man healing at a hospital, wakes up. He seems to know Spawn. A janitor tries to make money off Jim's story and calls a lawyer, who later commits suicide. A thug is paid to capture Jim and attacks him with a flaming skull. In the ensuing fight, the hospital is set on fire and Jim transforms into Spawn. After killing his attacker, Jim escapes the burning building in human form, eventually being taken in by firefighters.

After being taken to another hospital, he leaves, reunites with his previous nurse Sara, and begins to transform. He calls Sara but leaves before she can see him. Meanwhile, a reporter begins to ask questions about the incident at the hospital. Wandering the city, Jim is attacked and kills his assailants. This draws the attention of Sam and Twitch, who recognize the chaos as Spawn's doings.

After reuniting with Sara and telling him about his transformation, Jim wanders off again and meets Wanda Blake, Al Simmons' ex-wife. She recognizes Jim as the form Al took when he originally returned to earth.

On Wanda's advice, Jim travels to Rat City and finds Spawn's throne and is met by an angel. Jim beats the angel in a fight and leaves. He finds out that a man working for Gilbert Sanchez has been asking questions about him.

The angel Spawn beat is later attacked by Clown, who removes her wings. When Spawn returns, she is powerless and insane and finds Freak and Violator. Despite Freak's warnings, Clown begins to deceive Jim and informs him his suit is a living being and then vanishes. Clown is arrested by Sam and Twitch and meets the leader of a vampire group to attempt to form a unity between the leader, Clown, and Spawn.

Mob members kill Gilbert Sanchez for his information on the new Spawn. Spawn attempts to learn more about Jim but is assaulted and uses his powers on his attacker. Jim later finds the man who had been asking Sara questions. He tracks him to his family's home, which is bombed, killing everyone inside but Spawn. Spawn finds more mob members, questions them further and kills them.

==== Resurrection ====
In Resurrection, Spawn is revived and is later told by God in dog form that Wanda has died and is now trapped in Hell, where Al must rescue her. He fights Satan and saves his wife. God and Satan are no longer twins because McFarlane lost the right to use the Man of Miracles character due to a copyright dispute with Marvel. Man of Miracles is retconned out of existence, and God and Satan are based on the Abrahamic story of Creation. After saving Wanda from Satan, she goes to Heaven and Spawn continues to protect the people in Wanda's memory from the forces of both Heaven and Hell, as well as any supernatural threats.

== Powers and abilities ==
Spawn has superhuman strength, speed, stamina, and durability. He can form metal spikes on his being for defense, conjure up objects, shapeshift, communicate with animals and transmutate matter. Spawn can also use demonic magic to heal and feed off the sins of people, stop time, and teleport. He also has a limit when using necroplasm and exceeding it would cause him to return to Hell. In life, Spawn, as Al, was a trained martial artist and weapon master with an expertise in military operations and tactics.

=== Necroplasm ===
Necroplasm is a substance from Hell and fuel for Hellspawns. Spawn can use said necroplasm to create energy blasts.

=== K7-Leetha ===
Spawn wears a living costume named Leetha of the 7th House of K (also known as K7-Leetha). It is an adaptable symbiotic organism that manifests as a suit. While wearing it, the host assumes a dominant role over the suit. Its shroud, spikes, chains, and skulls are all part of an organism bonded to his central nervous system that protects Spawn even if he is unconscious. Its red cape can be used to fly and can act as an extra set of limbs to protect Spawn from unexpected attacks. It conjures demonic chains that Spawn can use as weapons.

== List of comics, spin-offs and crossovers ==
=== Original spin-offs and crossovers (1994–2021) ===
Violator (1994)

A three-issue miniseries written by Alan Moore with art by Bart Sears. The series focused on the conflict between Violator/Clown and Tony Twist and also featured Spawn.

Angela (1994–1995)

From 1994 to 1995, a three-issue Angela limited series was published, written by Neil Gaiman and illustrated by Greg Capullo. The series along with Angela's one-shot were later reprinted in a trade paperback (ISBN 1-887279-09-1), which, as of 2005, is out-of-print.

Angela & Aria

A crossover between Angela and Aria.

Angela & Glory

A crossover between Angela and Glory.

Celestine

About Celestine. the angel from the Violator vs Badrock series in a two-shot series.

Violator vs Badrock (1995)

A four-issue miniseries released in 1995 written by Alan Moore. Drawn by Brian Denham. Ink by Jonathan Sibal and Danny Miki.

Spawn: Blood Feud (1995)

A four-issue miniseries released in 1995 written by Alan Moore. Drawn by Tony Daniel. Inked by Kevin Conrad.

Spawn the Impaler (1996)

A three-issue miniseries released in October 1996, inspired by the story of the Wallachian voivode Vlad Țepeș. Written by Mike Grell with art by Rob Prior.

Medieval Spawn / Witchblade (1996)

A three-issue miniseries was written by Garth Ennis. Medieval Spawn and the wielder of the Witchblade team up against Lord Cardinale, wielder of the Darkness.

Curse of the Spawn (1996–1999)

The first long-term monthly spinoff series. Consisted of a number of story arcs centered on supporting characters from the main series, such as a future Hellspawn during the Apocalypse or Sam & Twitch. Aimed at an older demographic than the main series and is significantly darker in tone, with more disturbing visuals and themes. 29 issues.

Spawn: The Dark Ages (Vol. 1, 1999–2001)

This series focused on Lord Covenant, a 12th-century knight killed in a holy crusade far from his homeland, who returns to Earth as a Hellspawn. As a plague of violence and turmoil cover the English countryside, the Dark Knight must choose whether to align himself with the innocent inhabitants of the once-thriving kingdom or with the malevolent forces of evil and corruption. The series ran for 28 issues. Issues 15–28 featured writer Steve Niles and artist Nat Jones.

Spawn: Fan Edition

A three issue mini-series centered around the Norse Hellspawn Nordik.

Spawn: Blood and Shadows (1999)

A Spawn prestige-format one-shot released in 1999. Written by Paul Jenkins with art by Ashley Wood.

Cy-Gor (1999)

A six-issue spinoff miniseries.

Spawn: The Undead (1999–2000)

This series concentrates on Al Simmons. Unlike the original Spawn series, it was a self-contained, single-issue story. Written by Paul Jenkins it lasted 9 issues.

Sam & Twitch (1999–2004)

A spin-off series following the criminal investigations of detectives Sam Burke and Twitch Williams. 26 issues.

Case Files: Sam & Twitch (2003–2006)

Continuation of Sam & Twitch. 25 issues.

Sam & Twitch: The Writer (2010)

A four-issue miniseries.

Haunt (2009)

A story of two brothers (one a ghost, the other a human) who fuse together to become Haunt, a character that appears in other Spawn stories.

Hellspawn (2000–2003)

A relatively avant-garde spin-off comic inspired by Spawn. Darker and more atmospheric than Spawn, Hellspawn frequently dealt with the disturbing subject matter. It originally featured writer Brian Michael Bendis and artist Ashley Wood. It ran 16 issues.

Spawn: Simony (2003)

One-shot. Published in 2003 by Semic, McFarlane allowed the creators (Jean-François Porchero and Alex Nikolavitch) to create an original Spawn tale without using Image comics. This has Spawn fight against Necro Cop.

Shadows of Spawn (2005–2006)

Three graphic novel compilations of the Spawn manga.

Spawn Toys

A nine-issue series of one-shots packed in with early Spawn toys.

Spawn: Architects of Fear (2011)

A prestige format one-shot released in February 2008. Written by Arthur Claire with artwork by Aleksi Briclot.

Spawn: Blood and Salvation

A prestige-format one-shot that concludes the story of Daniel Llanso, the Hellspawn featured in the first four issues of Curse of the Spawn.

Spawn/Batman (1994)

Intercompany crossover was written by Frank Miller with the art of Todd McFarlane. Considered part of Spawn and Miller's Dark Knight universe canon.

Cover of Spawn/Batman Polish edition. Art by Kiko Taganashi and Todd McFarlane.

Batman/Spawn: War Devil

Continuation of Spawn/Batman crossover, written by Doug Moench, Chuck Dixon, and Alan Grant and drawn by Klaus Janson.

The Adventures of Spawn

At the 2006 San Diego Comic-Con, it was announced that a new take on the Spawn mythos was in the works. This new Spawn story is known as The Adventures of Spawn and as stated by Jon Goff, a moderator on the Spawn.com Message Board and McFarlane employee, it is a re-imagining of the Spawn story that is essentially a "What if?" universe that hearkens back to classic kid-friendly Saturday morning cartoons. The story takes place in a webcomic format and has been tied into the action figure world through McFarlane Toys' Spawn Series 30.

Misery

A future series announced by McFarlane about Cyan Fitzgerald and her titular alter-ego.

It was later released as a mini series.

Spawn/Witchblade

A four-issue mini-series centered in medieval times focusing on the Medieval Spawn and the wielder of the Witchblade of that time. A sequel to the 1993 series.

Sam and Twitch True Detectives

An eight-part mini-series focusing on Sam and Twitch which would tie in with the upcoming film.

However this did not happen and became the ongoing series Sam and Twitch case files.

Spawn: Resurrection

A one-shot that takes place around the same time as Spawn 250 explaining how Al returned.

Spawn Kills Everyone

A one-shot focusing on a chibi Spawn killing everyone.

Spawn Kills Everyone Too!

A four-part mini-series sequel to the one-shot Spawn Kills Everyone.

=== Spawn's Universe (2021–2024) ===
Starting in June 2021, a one-shot titled Spawn's Universe #1 was released. With it came the announcements and introductions to three new Spawn monthly titles. With the release of this one-shot, lead to three new titles being released that same year; King Spawn, Gunslinger Spawn and The Scorched. The first issue for each of these four titles had a positive reception, with each title selling well over 200,000 units each.

Spawn's Universe (2021)

In June 2021 an oversized one-shot special, written by Todd McFarlane and features art by Stephen Segovia, Jim Cheung and Marcio Takara. This special sets up three other ongoing monthly titles which followed.

King Spawn (2021 – present)

King Spawn was the first ongoing story from the Spawn universe, since the mainline series was released in 1992. Starting in August 2021, the series first 24 issues were written by Sean Lewis with art primarily by Javier Fernández. McFarlane took over primary writing duties from 25 to 39 where he was then joined by co-writer Rory McConville and new series artist, Yıldıray Çınar. The story follows Spawn as he faces old and new foes while becoming king.

Gunslinger Spawn (2021 – present)

Gunslinger Spawn was the second new-ongoing series was released in October 2021, written by Todd McFarlane and illustrated by Brett Booth. This series focuses on the adventures of Gunslinger Spawn's after becoming trapped in modern times. Following the events of Spawn #350, Gunslinger Spawn artist, Brett Booth, and main-line Spawn series artist, Carlo Barberi, switched art duties, with Barberi becoming the primary artist on Gunslinger Spawn following #29 and Booth taking over Spawn art duties with Spawn #350.

The Scorched (2022 – present)

The third ongoing series launched as a part of the Spawn Universe is The Scorched. The series was released in January 2022, and was written by Sean Lewis with art by Stephen Segovia. Beginning with #23, John Layman became the new writer of the series. The story focuses on a team of rotating roster of heroes, with the core group consisting of She-Spawn, Gunslinger Spawn, Medieval Spawn, and Redeemer.

Batman/Spawn (2022)

In December 2022, a third intercompany crossover between Batman and Spawn was published. Though the series could have been released as a mini-series it was ultimately released as a one-shot special. The one-shot was written by Todd McFarlane and artist Greg Capullo.

Spawn: Unwanted Violence (2023)

A two issue miniseries released in January–February 2023, was written by McFarlane and illustrated by Mike del Mundo. The story focused on a conflict between Spawn and The Freak.

=== The New U (2024 – present) ===
Following the events of Spawn #350, a new line-up of titles was announced in February 2024. "The New U" was set to build up on the foundations of Spawn's Universe and launch a new era of Spawn titles. Each title in The New U retains a price point of $2.99 or $3.99 for first issues, with the rest in the series continuing to be $2.99.

Sam and Twitch: Case Files (2024–2026)

In March 2024, an ongoing series title focusing on Sam and Twitch came out, created by McFarlane and co-plotted by Jon Goff, with art by Syzmon Kudranski for the first 8 issues. For issues 9–16, it was co-plotted by Jordan Barel, with series art by & Thomas Nachlik

Sam and Twitch: Gangland

A two-issue mini-series focusing on Sam and Twitch.

Rat City (2024–2026)

A new ongoing series, Rat City, written by Erica Schultz and illustrated by Ze Carlos, was released April 2024. The series follows Peter Cairn, known as 'The devient' set a hundred years in the future. Peter Cairn is the cybernetic Spawn of the future, who was transformed through the actions of Al Simmons in Spawn #350.

The series concludes in issue 25 though Peter Cairn will appear in future spawn universe titles.

Monolith (2024)

Monolith is a three-issue mini-series about the origins of the Hellspawn Monolith. Starting in May 2024, the series was written by Sean Lewis featuring art by Valerio Giangiordano, .

Misery (2024)

A four-issue mini-series focusing on the title character helping innocents who've been victimized by evil. Written by McFarlane and illustrated by Kudranski, the series starting in June 2024 & ending in September 2024.

Medieval Spawn (2025)

A four-issue mini-series focusing on Medieval Spawn's origins and how he ended up in the current times.

Spawn Kills Every Spawn (2024)

A series about Spawn killing other versions of himself. Written and drawn by John Layman and Rob Duenes.

Violator: Origin (2024–2025)

A series focusing on the origin story of the titular character, Violator. The series is drawn by six different artists covering six different points in the Violators history. Written by Marc Andreyko, featuring art by (in issue order), Piotr Kowalski, Kyle Hotz, Jonathan Wayshak, Gianenrico Bonacorsi, Kevin Maguire, and Von Randal. The series lasted from September 2024 to March 2025.

Knights vs. Samurai (2024–2025)

An ongoing series centered around knights against Samurai.

Deadly Tales of the Gunslinger (2024 – present)

A Gunslinger series about his days in the American Civil War. Written by Jimmy Palmiotti and illustrated by Patric Reynolds.

The Curse of Sherlee Johnson (2025 – present)

Originally titled No Home Here, the story follows Kincaid's final victim from issue 5 of Spawn, Sherlee Johnson. The series was written and drawn by Jonathan Glapion.

Focus

A series focusing on the young speedster who gained his abilities from being experimented on and first appeared in Gunslinger Spawn. Written by McFarlane and illustrated by Marco Failla.

I Saw Santa (2025)

A two-issue mini-series focusing on Spawn, Sam and Twitch trying to stop a homicidal child from killing Santa.

Spawn: The Dark Ages (vol. 2, 2025-2026)

A six-issue mini-series focusing on Devil Spawn from 700 years in the past, this is a 5th-century, post-Roman, rugged melodrama, with the last gasp of the old Celtic beliefs, and Britain being attacked from all sides. Written and drawn by Liam Sharp. The comic will be released in October 2025.

She-Spawn (2026)

An upcoming mini-series about Jessica Priest as She-Spawn.

Spawn '77 (2026)

An upcoming mini-series about adventures of 1977's Spawn before Al Simmons that inspired from Todd Mcfarlane's original design.

Bloodletter (2025)

A five-issue mini-series centered around Bloodletter.

The Freak

An upcoming mini-series centered around the Freak.

Black Ritual: The Book of NYX (2025)

Originally called Cultus Noctis: The Book of Nyx it is a seven-issue mini-series about Nyx between the time she took on the She-Spawn mantle and becoming the Queen of Hell In an interview video Thomas said two more 7 issue mini series will come after the first is over.

I Saw Spawn

The sequel to I Saw Santa After a few years, he ceased the payment of royalties and gave Gaiman notice that he owned all rights to the characters, citing the copyright notice from #9 and claimed that Gaiman's work had been work-for-hire and that McFarlane was the sole owner.

In 2002, Gaiman filed suit against McFarlane and, in response, McFarlane counter-sued. Gaiman had partnered with Marvel Comics to form Marvels and Miracles, LLC, which bankrolled the lawsuit. The main goal was to determine the issue of ownership for another character Gaiman felt he had a stake in, Miracleman, which at the time McFarlane was believed to hold a sizable stake in after his buyout of the assets of Eclipse Comics. This issue was thrown out. Instead, the court chose to rule on the breach of contract issue, the rights of ownership and the copyrightability of the characters from Spawn #9. Several arguments were presented by McFarlane and all were rejected, leading to a sizable judgment against McFarlane and Image Comics. The matter went to appeal and the judgment was upheld in a 2004 decision.

Gaiman's rights as co-creator and co-owner of Cogliostro, Angela, and Medieval Spawn were acknowledged. The court's view was that Gaiman and McFarlane's collaboration led to each contributing half of the work. Gaiman wrote the story while McFarlane illustrated the character; because of this, each held a 50% stake in the characters. Issue 9 was reprinted for the first time since the lawsuit was filed in the hardcover edition of Spawn Origins: Volume 1. In a reprint collection of the first twelve issues of Spawn, the contentious issue (along with Dave Sim's #10, featuring copyrighted character Cerebus) was excluded, but both issues have been reprinted in the hardcover and deluxe editions of Spawn Origins Collection: Volume 1, and the black and white 2012 (and the later 2021 color edition) softcover omnibus Spawn Compendium 1, collecting Spawn issues #1–50. In 2012, McFarlane and Gaiman settled their dispute, and Gaiman was given full ownership of the character Angela. Gaiman, in turn, sold all rights to the character to Marvel Comics.

=== Tony Twist lawsuit ===
Todd McFarlane created a mob enforcer character named "Antonio 'Tony Twist' Twistelli", who McFarlane acknowledged was named after hockey player Tony Twist. Twist won a $15 million verdict in 2004 when a jury found Todd McFarlane Productions had profited from Twist's likeness. The verdict was upheld after two appeals in June 2006, but the two later settled out of court for $5 million.

== Creative teams ==
Writers

- Todd McFarlane (#'s 1–7, 12–15, 21–150, 185–current) (wrote #'s 201–219 under pseudonym Will Carlton)
- Brian Holguin (#'s 71–150, 185–190)
- David Hine (#'s 150–184)
- Jonathan David Goff (#'s 200–241, 297, 303–305)
- Paul Jenkins (#'s 251–254)
- Erik Larsen (#'s 259–266)
- Darragh Savage (#'s 276–282)
- Rory McConville (#'s 327–current)

Artists

- Todd McFarlane (#'s 1–15, 21–24, 26–34, 50, 195–196, 200, 300)
- Greg Capullo (#'s 16–20, 26–37, 39, 41, 43, 45, 47, 49–75, 78–100, 193, 200, 300–301)
- Angel Medina (#'s 101–139, 142–150)
- Philip Tan (#'s 150–164, 306–307)
- Brian Haberlin (#'s 166–173, 176–178, 180–184)
- Whilce Portacio (#'s 185–192, 194–195, 197)
- Erik Larsen (#'s 199, 258–266) (contributed uncredited inking work on #27)
- Szymon Kudranski (#'s 201–250, 256–257, 267–275, 283, 291–292)
- Jonboy Meyers (#'s 251–256)
- Jason Shawn Alexander (#'s 276–282, 284–290, 293–305)
- Carlo Barberi (#'s 311–350)
- Brett Booth (#'s 351 onwards)

Guest writers

- Alan Moore (#'s 8, 37) (also wrote Spawn: Blood Feud prelude back-up story in #32)
- Neil Gaiman (#9) (also wrote a scene in #26 uncredited)
- Dave Sim (# 10)
- Frank Miller (#11)
- Grant Morrison (#'s 16–18)
- Andrew Grossenberg (#'s 19–20)
- Tom Orzechowski (#'s 19–20)
- Julia Simmons (#38)
- Steve Niles (#'s 105–106)
- Robert Kirkman (#200)
- Scott Snyder (#300)

Guest artists

- Marc Silvestri (#'s 25, 200)
- Tony Daniel (#'s 38, 40, 42, 44, 46, 48) (also drew Spawn: Blood Feud prelude back-up story in #32)
- Dwayne Turner (#'s 76–77)
- Nat Jones (#'s 139–141)
- Lan Medina (#165)
- Bing Cansino (#'s 174–175)
- Mike Mayhew (#179)
- Rob Liefeld (#196) (contributed uncredited inking work on #11 along with Jim Lee)
- Khary Randolph (#198)
- Robert Kirkman (#200)
- Michael Golden (#200)
- J. Scott Campbell (#300)
- Jerome Opeña (#'s 300–301)
- Clayton Crain (#301)
- Ken Lashley (#'s 308–309)
- Jim Muniz (#310)

== Collected editions ==
Many issues of Spawn have been gathered together in various trade paperbacks collections since the mid-nineties. The original US and UK trade releases contain issue 9, but not 10 (Cerebus' appearance).

Each containing four to five issues, the original Spawn trade paperbacks started in 1995 under a different trade cover design, going up to three volumes only. After the live-action 1997 movie, a new trade cover design was created, with Brent Ashe providing new covers for Books 1–7, and Ashley Wood for Books 8–12. These reissues were retitled with subtitles. The sequential trades stopped after Book 12, but several new volumes appeared in 2006–2008, collecting various story arcs. Beginning in 2009, a new series of volumes was released, collecting the "Endgame" storyline. From 2015 to 2020, with "Resurrection", "Satan Saga Wars", "Hell on Earth", "Dark Horror", "Enemy of the State", and "Vengeance" volumes, the trade paperbacks have started in sequential order again collecting issues #251–297.

After a two-year gap, the line resumed with three volumes released in 2022: "Spawn: Record Breaker" (May 2022), Spawn: Aftermath (July 2022) and Spawn: Omega (September 2022), between them collecting Spawn issues #298-314.

- Book 1, "Beginnings", 1–5
- Book 2, "Dark Discoveries", 6–9, 11
- Book 3, "Book 3", 12–15
- Book 4, "Book 4", 16–20
- Book 5, "Death and Rebirth", 21–25
- Book 6, "Pathway to Judgement", 26–30
- Book 7, "Deadman's Touch", 31–34
- Book 8, "Betrayal of Blood", 35–38
- Book 9, "Urban Jungle", 39–42
- Book 10, "Vengeance of the Dead", 43–47
- Book 11, "Crossroads", 48–50 (50 is double-sized)
- Book 12, "Immortality", 51–54
- Spawn: Capital Collection (January 1993) – contains issues 1–3 (note: this was a limited edition hardcover exclusively available from Capital City Distribution, and only 1200 copies were made)
- Spawn: The Armageddon Collection Part 1 – contains issues 150–155
- Spawn: The Armageddon Collection Part 2 – contains issues 156–164
- Spawn: The Complete Armageddon Collection – contains issues 150–164
- Spawn: New Flesh Collection (December 2007) – contains issues 166–169, plus a short story from Image Holiday Special 2005
  (note: Issue #165 wasn't included because it features the story of Mandarin Spawn)
- Spawn: Neo Noir – contains issues 170–175
- Spawn: EndGame Volume 1 (June 2009) – contains issues 185–190, with some altered artwork
- Spawn: EndGame Volume 2 (April 2010) – contains issues 191–196, with some altered artwork
- Spawn: EndGame Collection (January 2011) – combines Endgame Vol 1 and 2 (issues 185–196 with some altered artwork)
- Spawn: New Beginnings Volume 1 (July 2011) – contains issues 201–206.
- Spawn: New Beginnings Volume 2 (March 2012) – contains issues 207–212.
- Spawn: Resurrection (November 2015) – contains Spawn: Resurrection #1 and issues 251–255.
- Spawn: Satan Saga Wars (June 21, 2016) – collects SPAWN #256–262
- Spawn: Hell on Earth (September 20, 2017) – collects SPAWN #263–275
- Spawn: Dark Horror (April 23, 2019) – collects SPAWN #276–283
- Spawn: Enemy of the State (August 21, 2019) – collects SPAWN #284-290
- Spawn: Vengeance (May 27, 2020) – collects SPAWN #291-297
- Spawn: The Record Breaker (May 11, 2022) – collects SPAWN #298-301
- Spawn: Aftermath (July 13, 2022) – collects SPAWN #302-307
- Spawn: Omega (September 28, 2022) – collects SPAWN #308-314
- Spawn: Shadows (February 7, 2024) – collects SPAWN #316-323
- Spawn: Bad Business (August 27, 2024) - collects SPAWN #324-330
- Spawn: Sinn's War (February 19, 2025) - collects SPAWN #331-336

=== Spawn Collection ===
In 2005, the entire Spawn series began to appear in massive trade paperback releases under the title Spawn Collection – each volume containing approximately twenty issues, except for the first one, which contains ten. Released after the Gaiman lawsuit, these editions do not contain either Issue 9 (featuring the first appearance of Angela and Cogliostro, both created by Neil Gaiman) or Issue 10 (featuring Dave Sim's Cerebus).

Spawn Collection Volumes 1 and 2 were published in both hardcover and trade paperback formats, while Volume 3 onward were only released as trade paperbacks. As of 2009, Spawn Collection Volume 1 is currently out of print, with its fourth printing released in June 2007. In 2009 it was announced that the Spawn Collection would end with Volume 6, to be replaced by a new TBP format that includes soft- and hardcover versions, reprinting the entire Spawn series from the early issues once again (Spawn Origins Collection, see below).

- Spawn Collection Volume 1 – contains issues 1–8, 11–12 (December 2005)
- Spawn Collection Volume 2 – contains issues 13–33 (July 2006)
- Spawn Collection Volume 3 – contains issues 34–54 (March 2007)
- Spawn Collection Volume 4 – contains issues 55–75 (September 2007)
- Spawn Collection Volume 5 – contains issues 76–95 (April 2008)
- Spawn Collection Volume 6 – contains issues 96–116 (August 2008)

Spawn Collection Volume 1 was ranked 17 in the top 100 graphic novels for December 2005 period, with pre-order sales of 3,227.

=== Spawn Compendium ===
In 2012, in celebration of Image Comics' then 20 years as a publisher and Spawn being one of their longest running titles, Spawn Compendium was released, reprinting Spawn issues #1–50 at 1136 pages in black and white, though this volume does not collect the individual issues' covers. The book went to a second printing in March 2016.

A new edition of this volume, collected now in full color, was released in February 2021 with a different front cover art (from Spawn #95, and back cover art from Spawn #70). As with the previous edition, this book does not collect the individual issues' covers. Subsequent volumes have been released since collecting every 50 issues per tome.

Title	Material collected	Pages	Publication date	ISBN
Spawn Compendium 1	Spawn #1–50 in black and white	1136	2012	978-1-60706-499-2
Spawn Compendium 1 Color	Spawn #1–50	1136	March 2, 2021	978-1-5343-1935-6
Spawn Compendium 2	Spawn #51–100	1084	December 28, 2021	978-1-5343-2095-6
Spawn Compendium 3	Spawn #101-150	1136	August 16, 2022	978-1-5343-2300-1
Spawn Compendium 4	Spawn #151-200	1136	December 20, 2022	978-1-5343-2358-2
Spawn Compendium 5	Spawn #201-250	1080	September 12, 2023	978-1-5343-2694-1
Spawn Compendium 6	Spawn #251-301, Resurrection 1	1144	August 20, 2024	978-1-5343-2733-7
Spawn Compendium 7	Spawn #302-350	1096	September 9, 2025	978-1-5343-3497-7

=== Spawn Origins Collection ===
In 2009, a line of newly redesigned and reformatted trade paperbacks was announced, replacing the Spawn Collection line (see above) and once again collecting the early issues of Spawn. These new trades feature new cover art by Greg Capullo, recreating classic Spawn covers. In addition to the 6 issue trade paperbacks, this line features three oversized 12–13 issue hardcovers, and two large 25-issue limited slipcased deluxe editions (which come in both a standard edition and a signed and numbered edition limited to 500 copies). The 12-issue hardcover edition of Volume One was the first to reprint both Issues 9 and 10, and the 25-issue deluxe editions did as well. Spawn Origins Collection Volume 20 trade paperback was the final volume released in 2014, collecting issues #117–122.

In May 2019, a new edition of Spawn Origins Collection Volume 1 TPB (6th printing) was published at the low cover price of US$9.99. The book went back to press again for a seventh printing a few months later in September 2019.

After an eight-year gap, the line resumed in April 2022 with Spawn Origins Collection Volume 21 collecting issues #123–128. Spawn Origins Collection Volume 22 collecting issues #129–134 was published in September 2022.

Title	Material collected	Original Publication date	ISBN
Spawn Origins Collection Volume 1	Spawn #1–6	May 2009	
Spawn Origins Collection Volume 2	Spawn #7–9, 11–14	July 2009	
Spawn Origins Collection Volume 3	Spawn #15–20	December 2009	
Spawn Origins Collection Volume 4	Spawn #21–26	January 2010	
Spawn Origins Collection Volume 5	Spawn #27–32	May 2010	
Spawn Origins Collection Volume 6	Spawn #33–38	July 2010	
Spawn Origins Collection Volume 7	Spawn #39–44	September 2010	
Spawn Origins Collection Volume 8	Spawn #45–50	November 2010	
Spawn Origins Collection Volume 9	Spawn #51–56	February 2011	
Spawn Origins Collection Volume 10	Spawn #57–62	March 2011	
Spawn Origins Collection Volume 11	Spawn #63–68	June 2011	
Spawn Origins Collection Volume 12	Spawn #69–74	September 2011	
Spawn Origins Collection Volume 13	Spawn #75–80	January 2012	
Spawn Origins Collection Volume 14	Spawn #81–86	March 2012	
Spawn Origins Collection Volume 15	Spawn #87–92	June 2012	
Spawn Origins Collection Volume 16	Spawn #93–98	September 2012	
Spawn Origins Collection Volume 17	Spawn #99–104	February 2013	
Spawn Origins Collection Volume 18	Spawn #105–110	May 2013	
Spawn Origins Collection Volume 19	Spawn #111–116	September 2013	
Spawn Origins Collection Volume 20	Spawn #117–122	February 2014	
Spawn Origins Collection Volume 21	Spawn #123–128	April 2022	
Spawn Origins Collection Volume 22	Spawn #129–134	September 2022	
Spawn Origins Collection Volume 23	Spawn #135–140	October 2022	
Spawn Origins Collection Volume 24	Spawn #141–146	January 2023	
Spawn Origins Collection Volume 25	Spawn #147–152	June 2023	
Spawn Origins Collection Volume 26	Spawn #153–160	August 2023	
Spawn Origins Collection Volume 27	Spawn #161–166	September 2023	
Spawn Origins Collection Volume 28	Spawn #167–172	February 2024	
Spawn Origins Collection Volume 29	Spawn #173–178	August 2024	
Spawn Origins Collection Volume 30	Spawn #179–184	February 2025	
Spawn Origins Collection Volume 31	Spawn #185–190	September 2025	
Spawn Origins Collection Volume 32	Spawn #191-196	April 2026	

=== Hardcover edition ===
The Spawn: Origins Hardcover collections are the same size as US standard comic book deluxe editions, and typically collect 12 issues of Spawn.

Title	Material collected	Pages	Publication date	ISBN
Spawn: Origins Collection, Book 1	Spawn #1–12	300	March 30, 2010	978-1607061533
Spawn: Origins Collection, Book 2	Spawn #13–25	328	November 2, 2010	978-1607062288
Spawn: Origins Collection, Book 3	Spawn #26–37	328	March 8, 2011	978-1607062370
Spawn: Origins Collection, Book 4	Spawn #38–50	325	September 27, 2011	978-1607064374
Spawn: Origins Collection, Book 5	Spawn #51–62	325	January 3, 2012	978-1607062431
Spawn: Origins Collection, Book 6	Spawn #63–75	325	May 1, 2012	978-1607065302
Spawn: Origins Collection, Book 7	Spawn #76–87	320	September 18, 2012	978-1607065869
Spawn: Origins Collection, Book 8	Spawn #88–100	368	April 9, 2013	978-1607066750
Spawn: Origins Collection, Book 9	Spawn #101–112	384	September 10, 2013	978-1607067764
Spawn: Origins Collection, Book 10	Spawn #113–125	352	October 11, 2016	978-1632159069
Spawn: Origins Collection, Book 11	Spawn #126–138	352	November 30, 2022	978-1534324015
Spawn: Origins Collection, Book 12	Spawn #139–151	368	April 19, 2023	978-1534399761
Spawn: Origins Collection, Book 13	Spawn #152–163	312	October 24, 2023	978-1534398139
Spawn: Origins Collection, Book 14	Spawn #164–176	320	July 23, 2024	978-1534397002
Spawn: Origins Collection, Book 15	Spawn #177–188	296	December 31, 2024	978-1534387829
Spawn: Origins Collection, Book 16	Spawn #189–200	312	June 25, 2025	978-1534326460
Spawn: Origins Collection, Book 17	Spawn #201-212	336	July 15, 2026	978-1534332737

=== Deluxe edition ===
The Spawn Origins Collection: Deluxe Editions are wider and taller than normal deluxe editions. Each book comes with a slipcase for the book.

Title	Material collected	Pages	Publication date
Spawn Origins Collection: Deluxe Edition Volume 1	Spawn #1–25	704	First printing: June 9, 2010; Latest printing: December 27, 2022
Spawn Origins Collection: Deluxe Edition Volume 2	Spawn #26–50	712	First printing: December 8, 2010; Latest printing: December 27, 2022
Spawn Origins Collection: Deluxe Edition Volume 3	Spawn #51–75	710	First printing: November 21, 2012; Latest printing: December 27, 2022
Spawn Origins Collection: Deluxe Edition Volume 4	Spawn #76–100	710	First printing: November 27, 2013; Latest printing: December 27, 2022
Spawn Origins Collection: Deluxe Edition Volume 5	Spawn #101–125	715	December 28, 2022
Spawn Origins Collection: Deluxe Edition Volume 6	Spawn #126–150	720	July 4, 2023
Spawn Origins Collection: Deluxe Edition Volume 7	Spawn #151–175	680	June 4, 2024
Spawn Origins Collection: Deluxe Edition Volume 8	Spawn #176–200	680	May 20, 2025
Spawn Origins Collection: Deluxe Edition Volume 9	Spawn #201–225	648	May 18, 2027

=== UK releases ===
These releases were originally published in fifteen 5–6-issue volumes in the UK by Titan Books, with titles named by religious themes. The following books contained original series issues 1–82, with the exception of the previously mentioned Issue 10.

- Creation – contains issues 1–5
- Evolution – contains issues 6–9 and 11
- Revelation – contains issues 12–15
- Escalation – contains issues 16–20
- Confrontation – contains issues 21–25
- Retribution – contains issues 26–30
- Transformation – contains issues 31–36
- Abduction – contains issues 37–42
- Sanction – contains issues 43–48
- Damnation – contains issues 49–53
- Corruption – contains issues 54–58
- Devastation – contains issues 59–64
- Termination – contains issues 65–70
- Resurrection – contains issues 71–76
- Ascension – contains issues 77–82

== Spawn Universe and related collections ==
=== King Spawn ===
King Spawn is the first ongoing spin-off of Spawn, written by Sean Lewis then Rory McConville with art by Javier Fernández and Yıldıray Çınar.

Trade Paperbacks

Title	Material collected	Pages	Publication date
King Spawn Volume 1	King Spawn #1 - 6	168	May 31, 2022
King Spawn Volume 2	King Spawn #7 - 12	144	March 28, 2023
King Spawn Volume 3	King Spawn #13 - 18	144	October 3, 2023
King Spawn Volume 4	King Spawn #19 - 24	144	March 5, 2024
King Spawn Volume 5	King Spawn #25 - 30	144	September 24, 2024
King Spawn Volume 6	King Spawn #31 - 36	144	April 1, 2025

King Spawn Origins

Just like the Spawn: Origins hardcover collections, the King Spawn Origins are the same size as US standard comic book deluxe editions, and typically collect 12 issues of King Spawn. Starting in October 2025, the series started to be collected in oversized hardcovers.

Title	Material collected	Pages	Publication date
King Spawn Origins Vol. 1	King Spawn #1 - 12	320	Oct 1, 2025

=== Gunslinger Spawn ===
Title	Material collected	Pages	Publication date
Gunslinger Spawn Volume 1	Gunslinger Spawn #1 - 6	170	August 2, 2022
Gunslinger Spawn Volume 2	Gunslinger Spawn #7 - 12	144	May 23, 2023
Gunslinger Spawn Volume 3	Gunslinger Spawn #13 - 18	144	December 5, 2023
Gunslinger Spawn Volume 4	Gunslinger Spawn #19 - 24	144	May 21, 2024
Gunslinger Spawn Volume 5	Gunslinger Spawn #25 - 30	144	November 19, 2024
Gunslinger Spawn Volume 6	Gunslinger Spawn #31 - 36	144	June 3, 2025

Gunslinger Spawn Origins

Title	Material collected	Pages	Publication date
Gunslinger Spawn Origins Vol. 1	Gunslinger Spawn #1 - 12	320	Jun 16, 2026

=== The Scorched ===
Title	Material collected	Pages	Publication date
The Scorched Volume 1	The Scorched #1 - 6	160	November 9, 2022
The Scorched Volume 2	The Scorched #7 - 12	144	July 18, 2023
The Scorched Volume 3	The Scorched #13 - 18	144	January 9, 2023
The Scorched Volume 4	The Scorched #19 - 26	144	July 23, 2024
The Scorched Volume 5	The Scorched #27 - 32	144	March 4, 2025
The Scorched Volume 6	The Scorched #33 - 38	144	September 23, 2025

The Scorched Origins

Title	Material collected	Pages	Publication date
The Scorched Origins Vol. 1	The Scorched #1 - 12	320	Jun 15, 2027

=== Sam & Twitch ===
Title	Material collected	Pages	Format	Publication date
Sam & Twitch (vol. 1)
Sam & Twitch Book 1: Udaku	Sam & Twitch (vol. 1) #1–8	192	TPB	December, 2000
Sam & Twitch: The Brian Michael Bendis Collection 1	Sam & Twitch (vol. 1) #1–9	224	TPB	May, 2006
Sam & Twitch: The Brian Michael Bendis Collection 2	Sam & Twitch (vol. 1) #10–19	224	TPB	July, 2007
Sam & Twitch Origins
Sam and Twitch Origins Book 1	Sam & Twitch (vol. 1) #1-13	328	HC	July, 2024
Sam and Twitch Origins Book 2	Sam & Twitch (vol. 1) #14-26	336	HC	January, 2025
Sam & Twitch: Case Files (vol. 3)
Sam & Twitch: Case Files Vol 1.	Sam & Twitch: Case Files (vol 3.) #1-8	208	TPB	April, 2025
Sam & Twitch Compendium
Sam and Twitch Compendium Vol. 1	Sam & Twitch (vol. 1) #1-26, Case Files: Sam & Twitch #1-25 and Sam & Twitch The Writer #1-4.	1320	TPB	July, 2025

=== Spin-off trade paperback collections ===
Several Spawn-related mini-series has been collected in trade paperback editions.

- Angela (later retitled Spawn: Angela's Hunt) – collects Neil Gaiman's Angela issues 1–3 and the 1995 one-shot.
- Spawn: Bloodfeud – collects Spawn: Bloodfeud 1–4 ISBN 1840231173
- Hellspawn: The Ashley Wood Collection – collects Hellspawn issues 1–10, replaces pages from issue 10 originally drawn by Ben Templesmith with new art by Ashley Wood
- Spawn: The Undead – collects Spawn: The Undead issues 1–9
- Medieval Spawn / Witchblade – collects Medieval Spawn / Witchblade 1–3 ISBN 188727944X
- Violator vs. Badrock – collects Alan Moore's crossover miniseries issues 1–4
- Shadows of Spawn Collection – collects the Spawn manga ISBN 1582406588
- Spawn: Book of the Dead ISBN 160706149X Released in both hardcover and softcover editions
- Alan Moore: Wild Worlds – collects Spawn/WildC.A.T.S. 1–4 ISBN 1401213790

=== One-shot editions ===
- Spawn: Blood and Shadows ISBN 1582401098
- Spawn: Blood and Salvation ISBN 1582401144
- Spawn: Simony ISBN 1582403651
- Spawn: Architects of Fear ISBN 1582408386
- Spawn: The Movie ISBN 1887279814
- Spawn: The Book Of Souls ASIN: B0039ODNQW
- Spawn: Bible ASIN: B001M0G3NK
- Spawn Adult Coloring Book
- Spawn: Godslayer
- Spawn/Batman ISBN 1582400199
- Batman/Spawn: War Devil ISBN 1563891441
- Spawn & Batman: Inner Demons (Unreleased)
- Spawn/Savage Dragon: Newsstand edition of Savage Dragon issue 30
- Angela Special
- Angela/Glory
- Glory/Angela
- Glory/Celestine
- Aria-Angela Blank & Noir

=== Spin-off hardcover collection ===
A few Spawn-related mini-series have been collected in HC editions.

- Spawn: The Dark Ages Complete Collection – collects issues 1–28 ISBN 1607066866
- Hellspawn: Complete Collection – collects issues 1–16 ISBN 1607061554
- Batman/Spawn: The Classic Collection – collects Batman/Spawn: War Devil and Spawn/Batman ISBN 1779521502

==== Curse of the Spawn ====
Most of the Curse of the Spawn – spin-off series has been collected in trade paperback editions.

- Curse of the Spawn: Book 1: Sacrifice of the Soul – issues 1–4
- Curse of the Spawn: Book 2: Blood and Sutures – issues 5–8
- Curse of the Spawn: Book 3: Shades of Grey – issues 9–11, 29
- Curse of the Spawn: Book 4: Lost Values – issues 12–14, 22
- The Best of Curse of the Spawn – contains issues 1–8, 12–16 and 20–29 without the coloring

== In other media ==
=== Television ===
- Spawn made his animated debut in the HBO animated series Todd McFarlane's Spawn in which Spawn is voiced by Keith David. The series won two Emmys (one in 1998 and another in 1999) and two Golden Reel Awards (1998/1999).
- In 2011, Spawn starred in the Death Battle! episode "Kratos vs. Spawn", in which he faced off against Kratos from the God of War franchise, defeating him in the series' titular duel to the death, complimented by Inverse as "cute".
  - In 2025, Spawn returned to fight against Ghost Rider, who he would also defeat.
- In 2019, McFarlane revealed that there will be two animated shows based on the character, one for kids and the other for adults.

=== Film ===
- In 1997, a film adaptation featured Michael Jai White as Spawn. As a result, White became the first African American to portray a major comic book superhero in a major motion picture. The film received generally negative reviews.
- In early 2015, McFarlane announced a new Spawn film adaptation. In February 2016 McFarlane confirmed he had completed the script for the film with a larger-than-normal page count because he was "putting in details for [him]self" in conjunction with his hopes to direct. In July 2017, it was confirmed that McFarlane would direct the film, which is being produced under Jason Blum's production company Blumhouse. In May 2018, it was reported that Jamie Foxx would portray the title character. In July 2018, the working title was revealed to be Tony Dynamite. In November 2019, the film restarted development due to the financial success of the R-rated comic book film Joker. In August 2021, it was revealed that Broken City screenwriter Brian Tucker had been hired to rewrite McFarlane's screenplay. In October 2022, McFarlane announced that Scott Silver, Malcolm Spellman, and Matthew Mixon had been hired to rewrite the screenplay. In June 2023, Jason Blum announced that he is aiming for a 2025 release date. On July 22, 2024, McFarlane announced on his Twitter page that the script was completed, and that the film would be retitled King Spawn.
- Spawn appears in Ready Player One (2018). He also appears as an avatar fighting the forces of IOI on Planet Doom during the final battle.

=== Video games ===
Spawn as a playable character in Mortal Kombat 11.

Spawn has starred in several video games:

- Todd McFarlane's Spawn: The Video Game (1995) (SNES)
- Spawn: The Eternal (1997) (PlayStation)
- Spawn: The Ultimate (1997) (PlayStation, only released in Japan)
- Spawn (1999) (Game Boy Color) voiced by Scott Keck.
- Spawn: In the Demon's Hand (1999, 2000; Dreamcast, arcade) voiced by Maurice Dean Wint.
- Spawn: Armageddon (2003; Xbox, PlayStation 2, and GameCube) voiced by Kevin Michael Richardson.
- Soulcalibur II (2003; Xbox) voiced by Akio Otsuka in the Japanese version and by Kevin Michael Richardson in the English dub.
- Soulcalibur II HD Online (2013): (Xbox 360, PlayStation 3)
- Mortal Kombat 11 (2019; PlayStation 4, Xbox One, Switch, Microsoft Windows, PlayStation 5, Xbox Series X/S) with Keith David reprising his role. In his ending, he sends Kronika and Malebogia to hell for eternity and, with Scorpion's and Sub-Zero's assistance, makes a new goal to purge the eight Hells left.
- Call of Duty: Modern Warfare II (2023) with Keith David reprising his role. Spawn headlines the battle pass of Season 6, with multiple other in-game operators receiving skins themed around characters related to Spawn.
- Spawn appears in the Diablo: Immortal, which was released on September 29, 2026.

=== Merchandising ===
- At the time of the release of the live action film, Spawn appeared in several commercials for Taco Bell.
- In 1994, McFarlane Toys released the first line of Spawn toys produced, in later years the series would include alternate timeframes and different takes on the classic characters with toyline series.

=== Music ===
The Dark Saga by Iced Earth is a concept album based upon the Spawn story. The cover of the album, by Greg Capullo and Todd McFarlane, depicts Spawn himself, though due to legal issues, Iced Earth could not use the names of the characters in the songs.

== Reception ==
Spawn was ranked 60th on Wizard magazine's list of the Top 200 Comic Book Characters of All Time, 50th on Empire magazine's list of The 50 Greatest Comic Book Characters, and 36th on IGN's 2011 Top 100 Comic Book Heroes.
