= Aria (Image Comics) =

Comic book metaseries

Cover of Aria #1 (January 1999), art by Michael Turner

Aria is a comic book metaseries published by Image Comics (initially through Avalon Studios), written by Brian Holguin and drawn by Jay Anacleto.

Its protagonist is Kildare, a faerie who has chosen to live amongs the mortals.

There have been several Aria miniseries written over the course of 1999–2003, which have been collected in trade paperbacks.

== Aria (1999) ==
The story opens in a New York bookshop, specializing in the esoteric. The shop owner, a sardonic young woman named Kildare, over the course of a day deals with a woman who found a sword in her flat, two goths who want to drink absinthe, and a man looking for a bargain-basement love potion. After work, she goes back to her flat, where she is greeted by a talking mirror and a fish tank full of tiny merpeople.

She goes to a club which caters to an unusual clientele, where it becomes apparent that the woman is a Fae noble. She meets a man named Pug, later revealed to be a dwarf, and the bartender Dion, who is none other than the Greek god Dionysus. On the way home, she is attacked by a group of shadowy creatures.

Meanwhile, in an elven pub in Cottingly, a group of Fae are killed by further shadowy creatures.

In New York, Pug has rescued Kildare, and they are both looking for some answers. We are also introduced to Childe Roland, a half-elf street artist.

The death of the drinkers means that all of the Fae must return to their realm, temporarily for the funeral. 'Mad Ginny', the heroine's cousin, a touch insane, is the ultimate cause of the Cottingly Fairies fiasco. She, too, is being stalked by the shadowy creatures.

Eventually, the villain becomes apparent: a dark spiritual creature, who fought the Fae in ages past, and survived up to the present day as a shrub. After gathering strength for many years, his spirit is able to directly touch the physical world, and influence it, causing such disasters as the Great Fire of London in 1666. Finally he is able to take the shape of a human, he finds Mad Ginny, rapes her, and sires a son, through which he can act against the world at any time. The son is gathering the forces of the father.

In a final confrontation Kildare, Pug and a mortal wizard battle the son in a shadow realm. He is conducting a ceremony to transfer his soul to that of a human in our world which will allow him to act against mankind. The three defeat the son but not before he transfers his soul back to earth and the waiting recipient. Childe is waiting for him and quickly binds the man with magic.

On the final page we see that Ginny has moved to New York to live with Kildaire, the two of them work in Kildaire's antique and magic shop where the two of them watch over an urn that houses the soul of the dark one they trapped.

== Aria/Angela (2000) ==
This mini-series is a two issue crossover where Kildare meets Angela, the angel who appeared in Spawn. In London at the end of the 19th century, Kildare encounters a freak show exhibiting Angela and must rescue her. Because of copyright issues around the Angela character, this story was remade in 2021 as Heavenly Creatures.

== Aria: The Soul Market (2001) ==
In this six issue mini-series, Kildare battles Goodfellow, otherwise known as Puck from A Midsummer Night's Dream, who is involved in an underground market where human souls are traded.

== Aria: Summer's Spell (2002) ==
In this two issue mini-series, Kildare encounters a lost love, True Thomas, in 1960s London. In January 2002, Aria: A Midwinter's Dream was also published, which consisted of four illustrated text stories about Aria characters (Kildare, Pug, Ondine, and Lord Zephon).

== Aria: The Uses of Enchantment (2003) ==
In this four issue mini-series, Kildare investigates the Kingdom of Enchantment, an abandoned theme park from the 1950s, which contains a true hidden magical kingdom.

== Aria: Heavenly Creatures (2021) ==
This double-length one-shot is an almost panel-for-panel remake of 2000's Aria/Angela, but replacing Angela with an as-yet-unnamed similar character. This is due to Image Comics having lost the rights to use the Angela character in a 2012 court decision.

== Collected editions ==
The series has been collected into a number of trade paperbacks:

- Volume 1: The Magic of Aria (collects Aria, 140 pages, May 2002, ISBN 1-58240-139-X)
- Volume 2: The Soulmarket (collects The Soul Market, 144 pages, March 2004, ISBN 1-58240-339-2)
- Volume 3: The Enchanted Collection (collects Summer's Spell and The Uses of Enchantment, 144 pages, August 2004, ISBN 1-58240-361-9)
