= Spawn/Batman =

1994 one-shot comic book by Frank Miller

- Cover of Spawn/Batman (spring 1994) by Todd McFarlane, made in homage to Frank Miller's The Dark Knight Returns

Publication information
- Publisher: Image Comics
- Format: One-shot
- Genre: Superhero
- Publication date: 1994
- No. of issues: 1
- Main character: Batman; Spawn

Creative team
- Written by: Frank Miller
- Artist: Todd McFarlane

Spawn/Batman is a 1994 one-shot comic book written by Frank Miller with art by Todd McFarlane and published by Image Comics. The comic is an intercompany crossover between Batman and Spawn. The comic, along with Batman/Spawn: War Devil, was reprinted in Batman/Spawn: The Classic Collection on November 15, 2022.

== Plot ==
Batman comes to New York City in his search for an arsenal of high-tech weapons and robots that use decapitated human heads as their brains. Antagonistic, confrontational and suspicious of each other, Spawn and Batman engage in violent battles before realizing they are both after the same villain. Grudgingly, they decide to work together. The person they seek has been kidnapping and decapitating the homeless for use in the robots, but that is only part of the plan: there is also a nuclear arsenal ready to be deployed.

== Continuity ==
A note inside the front cover states that the one-shot is "a companion piece to DC Comics' The Dark Knight Returns. It does not represent current DC Comics continuity" and so on. Though the crossover has never been a part of the ongoing Spawn continuity either, it is a commonly held belief that the scar appearing on Spawn's face at the beginning of Spawn #21 is the same wound inflicted by Batman with a carefully thrown Batarang at the closing of the crossover, which is upheld by Spawn's remark in that very same issue that the scar was a result of his run-in with "some bozo in black". However, through some slight retcons, specifically with the non-chronological release of Spawn #19 and 20, the "bozo in black" in question is actually revealed/changed to be Harry Houdini, and the scar in question is the result of gunfire that Spawn suffered while protecting Terry Fitzgerald.

Frank Miller revealed that the crossover took place in his Batman shared universe alongside The Dark Knight Returns and its various sequels and prequels.

In the game Mortal Kombat 11, Raiden remarked that Spawn reminded him of another "Dark Knight". Spawn remarks that the "billion dollar crusader" is a friend.

== Batman/Spawn: War Devil ==
Another meeting of the two characters was Batman/Spawn: War Devil published by DC. It was written by Doug Moench, Chuck Dixon, and Alan Grant and drawn by Klaus Janson.

== Batman/Spawn (2022) ==
A third meeting between the two characters and a sequel to Spawn/Batman, which was going to be titled Spawn/Batman: Inner Demons and would have pitted Batman and Spawn against the Joker and Clown, was announced but never published.

In December 2022, a third intercompany crossover between Batman and Spawn was published. Though the series could have been released as a mini-series it was ultimately released as a one-shot special. The one-shot was written by Todd McFarlane and artist Greg Capullo.
