= Haunt (comics) =

Image Comics superhero

- Promotional art for Haunt #2. Art by Todd McFarlane.

Publication information
- Publisher: Image Comics
- First appearance: Haunt #1 (October 2009)
- Created by: Todd McFarlane; Robert Kirkman

In-story information
- Full name: Daniel Kilgore and Kurt Kilgore
- Species: Human (Daniel Kilgore); Ghost (Kurt Kilgore)
- Place of origin: Earth
- Team affiliations: The Scorched
- Abilities: Ectoplasm

Haunt is an American comic book published by Image Comics. Created by Todd McFarlane and Robert Kirkman, the series debuted in October 2009 and ended in December 2012 after 28 issues. The comic was originally written by Kirkman with penciling by Ryan Ottley, layouts by Greg Capullo, and inking by McFarlane, to a mixed to positive critical reception. Joe Casey and Nathan Fox took over as the book's creative team as of Haunt #19 to a universally negative reception, abandoning the original storyline and supporting cast and serving as a tie-in to the pair's Spawn series, in which Haunt is featured as a supporting character.

Set in the Image Universe, the series' eponymous superhero is the merged form of Catholic priest Daniel Kilgore and the ghost of his murdered secret agent brother, Kurt, who physically manifests as an ectoplasm-based suit.

== Overview ==
In a 2008 interview with Newsarama, Kirkman explained that the initial storyline in Haunt deals with Kurt trying to solve his own murder. In February 2009 at New York Comic Con, Kirkman provided an overview of the series:

The main basis of the story is that there are two brothers who have hated each other for a good long time and are now forced to interact because one of them has died and is haunting the other. It's a big action extravaganza from there on out.

== Background and creation ==
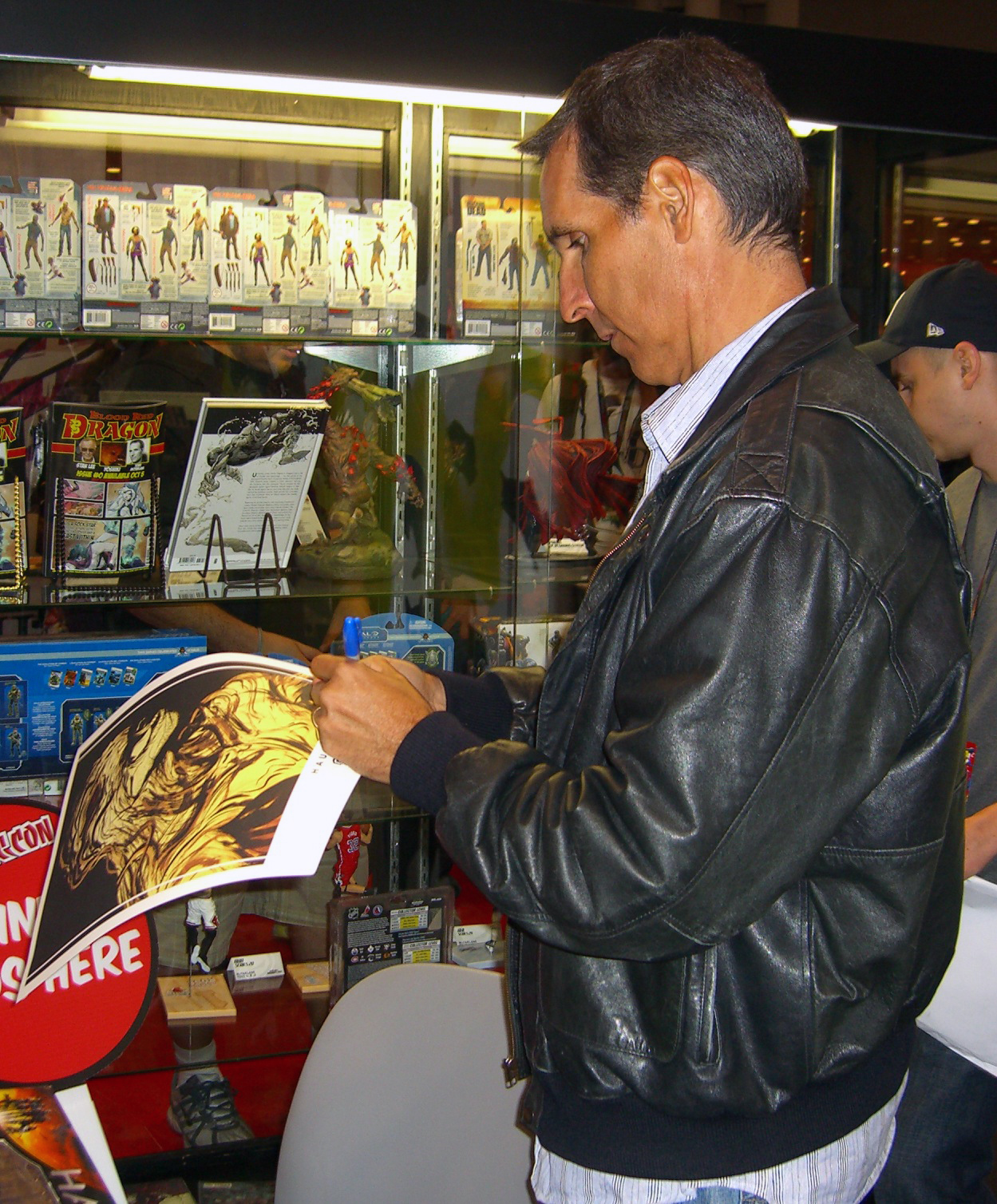
Co-creator Todd McFarlane signing a Haunt poster at the 2011 New York Comic Con.

During a Q&A session at the 2006 San Diego Comic-Con, McFarlane called on Kirkman, who was seated in the audience. Kirkman stood up and expressed that he was a fan, and wanted to know why McFarlane didn't work on comics anymore. Not recognizing Kirkman, McFarlane responded, "I always sort of felt if you could create your own Mickey Mouse, it's a pretty good living. You don't need to do a Donald Duck and a Goofy and a Minnie Mouse. Arguably, [I've done that] with Spawn." He added, "I do have some ideas, but I can only spread myself so thin." Fellow panelist Brian Haberlin finally told McFarlane that the audience member was Kirkman. After exchanging jokes, McFarlane asked Kirkman if he would be interested in collaborating on a project, to which Kirkman agreed.

Kurt was named after Kurt Vonnegut, while Daniel was named after Vonnegut's character, Kilgore Trout.

In 2007, Kirkman and McFarlane announced that they were working together on a new comic property titled Haunt with a series to debut in early 2008.

In July 2008 Kirkman explained that the book had been delayed due to artist trouble. This was prior to the announcement that Ottley and Capullo were joining the art team. It was also revealed that McFarlane would draw covers for the series.

In February 2009, Image provided a series of teaser images to Comic Book Resources featuring the first artwork for Haunt.

The initial teaser indicated a summer 2009 launch, but no firm date was established until July, when Image announced the premiere issue would be released October 7, 2009. McFarlane has shouldered the blame for the delays, saying, "I didn't want to be in a position where I put out a solicitation for the sake of putting out a solicitation. That's too easy." He added, "I know it's been a little frustrating to Robert, but it's already been two years – what's two years and one month? We gotta do it. We gotta get it right." In July, a limited edition, 16-page preview book debuted at the 2009 San Diego Comic-Con.

== Characters ==
=== Main ===
- Daniel Kilgore – An associate priest, he later quits his Church to join The Agency.
- Kurt Kilgore – A deceased Agency agent and Daniel's estranged brother, the two become closer after his murder is solved and The Agency trains Daniel.
  - Haunt – This being is created when Kurt's spirit merges with Daniel's body. They are merged through Kurt's spiritual tether to Daniel and generate ectoplasm.

=== Supporting ===
==== Issues #1–18 ====
- Director Beth Tosh – Kurt's former lover, now acting Director of the Agency.
- Mirage – An agent working for the Agency and another former lover of Kurt's, she watches over Daniel's progress.
- Assistant Director Theresa Rhodes – A sleeper agent in the Agency, she was instrumental in Kurt's murder.
- Mr. Hurg – A polyamorous crime boss obsessed with fitness and health, he orchestrated Kurt's death and is highly skilled in combat.
- Cobra – An assassin hired by Mr. Hurg, his face is mutilated by Haunt, and reconstructive surgery leaves him very similar to his namesake.
- Amanda Kilgore – Kurt's widow and Daniel's former lover. Her relationship with Daniel was cut short due to her infidelity with Kurt.
- Autumn Mueller – Daniel Kilgore's girlfriend, who formerly worked as a prostitute under the name Charity.
- Director Morgan Stantz – Director Stantz is the former director of the agency. It's said, that he only comes in if it's a big deal and was killed in issue 5.
- Alegria – One of Doctor Shillinger's test subjects, a spiritual woman with knowledge of the Haunt, who is able to see Kurt's ghost.
- The Apparition – A mysterious new foe of Kilgore brothers to tangle with, but this enemy is stronger, faster and has the same powers of Haunt... and more.

==== Issues #19–28 ====
- Purgatory – A demonic beast that collects lost souls.
- Deacon Larkin – The Leader of the Second Church.
- Still Harvey Tubman – The last conductor between astral and physical planes.
- Father Pearson – A deceased priest of the Second Church who was revived as a fire golem after his death.

== Reception ==
=== Sales ===
Less than a week before the release of Haunt #1, online columnist Rich Johnston reported that comic book retailers pre-ordered nearly 60,000 copies of the first issue, which is more than a typical issue of The Amazing Spider-Man.

=== Reviews ===
Haunt #1 received mixed reviews from critics. Jason Green of Playback:stl described the issue as "weird, wildly violent stuff, but it's also a visceral thrill, thanks mostly to the dark, evocative artwork." Green praised each of the book's creators, saying that they "mesh perfectly." On the other hand, Jesse Schedeen of IGN said Kirkman "doesn't offer any of his usual magic with these characters. Daniel and Kurt have no real depth to them. The series is completely and utterly cheerless. It takes itself far too seriously to the point of becoming a silly melodrama."

Chad Nevett of Comic Book Resources called the artwork "disappointing, if only because Ryan Ottley is a better artist than Haunt #1’s work displays." Nevett also criticized the book for reading "almost like a parody of itself with dark characters, [...] excessive violence, [...] and a character design obviously influenced by McFarlane’s work on Spider-Man." Haunt's design was also considered similar to symbiotes in Spider-Man.

== Collected editions ==
=== Trade paperbacks ===
Title	Material collected	Publication date	ISBN
Haunt, Volume 1	Haunt #1–5	April 2010	978-1607061540
Haunt, Volume 2	Haunt #6–12	February 2011	978-1607062295
Haunt, Volume 3	Haunt #13–18	June 2012	978-1607065524
Haunt, Volume 4	Haunt #19–24	October 2012	978-1607065883
Haunt, Volume 5 (only digital)	Haunt #25–28	January 2014	978-1607066798
Haunt, The Complete Collection	Haunt #1–28	October 2025	978-1534331891

=== Hardcover ===
Title	Material collected	Publication date	ISBN
Haunt: Immortal Edition	Haunt #1–12	August 2011	978-1607062417
