= Todd McFarlane =

Canadian comic book creator and entrepreneur (born 1961)

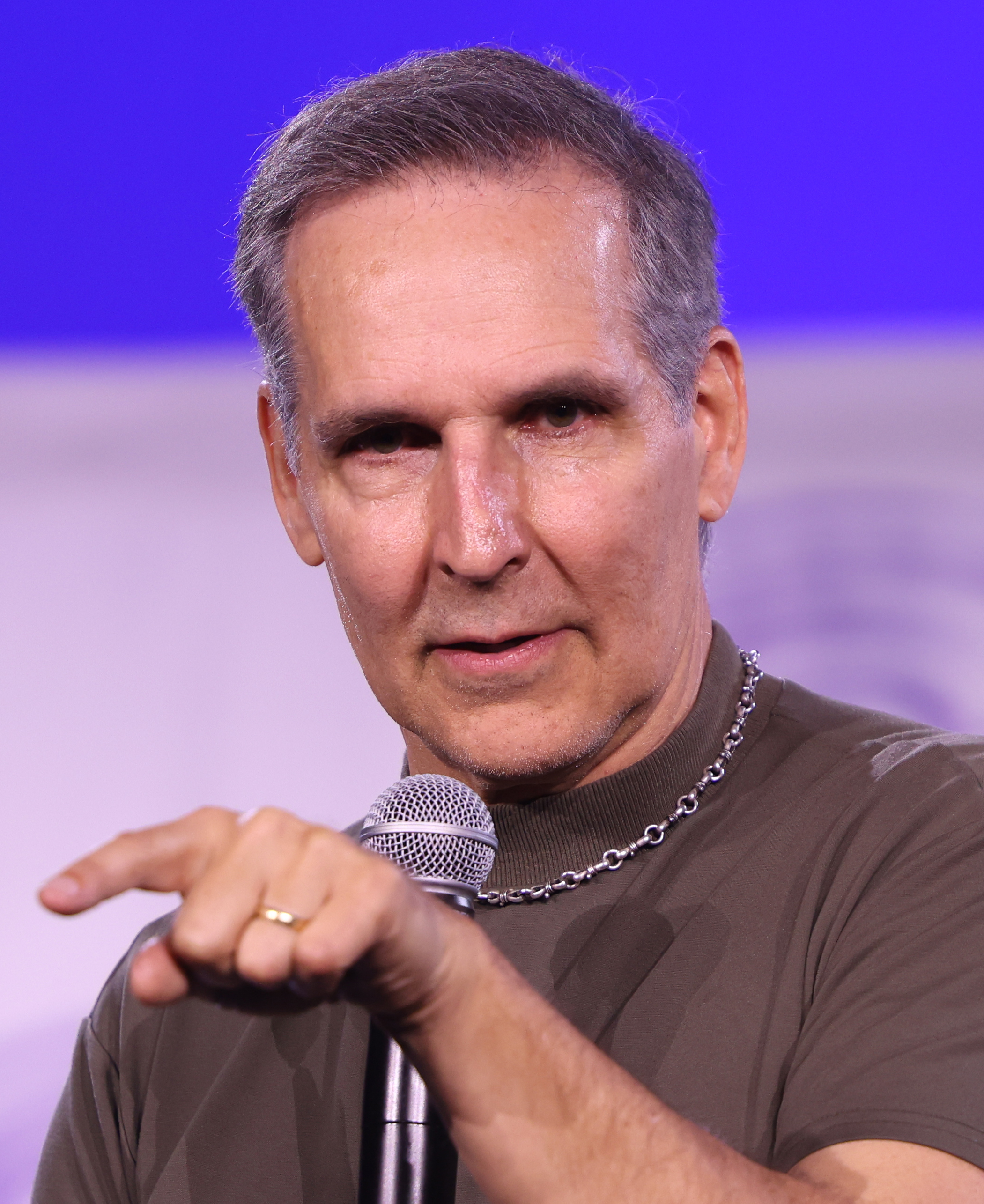
- McFarlane at the 2025 WonderCon
- Born: March 16, 1961 (age 65) Calgary, Alberta, Canada
- Areas: Writer, Penciller, Inker, Publisher
- Notable works: The Amazing Spider-Man; Batman: Year Two; Haunt; The Incredible Hulk; Infinity, Inc.; Spawn; Spider-Man
- Awards: Inkpot Award (1992); National Cartoonists Society Award (1992); National Football League Artist of the Year (2005)
- Spouse: Wanda Kolomyjec (m. 1985)
- Children: 3

Todd McFarlane (/məkˈfɑːrlɪn/; born March 16, 1961) is a Canadian comic-book creator, best known for his work as an artist on The Amazing Spider-Man and as the creator, writer, and artist on the superhero horror-fantasy series Spawn, as well as being the current President and a co-founder of Image Comics.

In the late 1980s and early 1990s, McFarlane became a comic-book superstar due to his high-selling work on Marvel Comics' Spider-Man franchise, on which he was the artist to draw the first full appearances of the character Venom. In 1992, he helped form Image Comics, pulling the occult anti-hero character Spawn from his high-school portfolio and updating him for the 1990s. The debut issue sold 1.7 million copies, which, as of 2007, remains a record for an independent comic book. The character's popularity in the 1990s also encouraged a trend in creator-owned comic-book properties.

After leaving inking duties on Spawn with issue No. 70 (February 1998), McFarlane has illustrated comic books less often, focusing on entrepreneurial efforts, such as McFarlane Toys and Todd McFarlane Entertainment, a film and animation studio. In September 2006, it was announced that McFarlane would be the Art Director of the newly formed 38 Studios, founded by Major League Baseball pitcher Curt Schilling. McFarlane used to be a co-owner of the National Hockey League's Edmonton Oilers before selling his shares to Daryl Katz. He is also a high-profile collector of record-breaking baseballs.

As a filmmaker, he produced the 1997 film adaptation of Spawn starring Michael Jai White.

== Early life ==
Todd McFarlane was born on March 16, 1961, in Calgary, Alberta, Canada, to Bob and Sherlee McFarlane. He is the second of three sons, which McFarlane says contributed to his competitive streak. Bob worked in the printing business, which led him to take work where he could find it, and as a result, during McFarlane's childhood, the family lived in thirty different places from Alberta to California.

Prototype version of the character Spawn, which McFarlane drew in his teens

McFarlane began drawing as a hobby at an early age, and developed an interest in comics, acquiring as many as he could and learning to draw from them. He was a fan of comics creators such as John Byrne, Jack Kirby, Frank Miller and George Pérez, as well as the writing of Alan Moore. (John Parker of ComicsAlliance has also noted the influence of Walt Simonson in McFarlane's work.) McFarlane created the character Spawn when he was 16, and spent "countless hours" perfecting the appearance of each component of the character's visual design.

One day while in the twelfth grade at Calgary's William Aberhart High School, McFarlane, working as a groundskeeper for the Calgary Cardinals, was standing in the bleachers when a 13-year-old ninth grader sitting near him named Wanda Kolomyjec, who served as the team's bat girl, began flirting with him. The two began dating, over the objections of Wanda's father, who thought she was too young for him, though in time McFarlane won him over.

Right after high school, McFarlane attended baseball tryouts at Gonzaga University. Despite being a good fielder and fast, he was not a good hitter. Moreover, he could not afford Gonzaga, so he attended Spokane Falls Community College for a year, his relationship with Wanda developing into a long-distance one. In 1981 McFarlane began attending Eastern Washington University (EWU) on a baseball scholarship, studying as part of a self-designed program for graphics and art. His practical goal was to join his father in the printing business in Calgary, though his dream was always to be a comic book creator. He worked part-time on campus as a janitor in the school's administration building, as his scholarship required an on-campus job, and also worked weekends at a comics shop called the Comic Rack, devoting a couple of hours late at night to practice his comics art.

He sought to play baseball professionally after graduation but suffered a serious ankle injury in his junior year during a game with arch-rivals Washington State University. He subsequently focused on drawing, working at the comic book store to pay for the rest of his education, and living in a trailer park in Cheney, Washington with Wanda, who had moved to the area to be with him and attend EWU as well. In 1984, a year after his injury, McFarlane's final chance to play for the big leagues came when he tried out with the Toronto Blue Jays' farm team in Medicine Hat, Alberta, but he ended up being ranked last on the roster, ending his professional baseball prospects. McFarlane graduated with a bachelor's degree that same year. He stayed in Spokane, Washington while Wanda finished her degree. She also co-plotted and edited the pages on which McFarlane developed his own comics character, Spawn.

== Career ==
=== Early work, DC, and Marvel ===
McFarlane's cover for DC's Batman No. 423 (Sept 1988)

While still in college, McFarlane began sending 30–40 packages of submissions each month to comics editors, totaling over 700 submissions after a year and a half, most of which were in the form of pinups. Half resulted in no response, while the other half resulted in rejection letters, though he received some constructive criticism from a few editors. One of them, DC Comics' Sal Amendola, gave McFarlane a dummy script to gauge McFarlane's page-to-page storytelling ability. Amendola's advice that McFarlane's submissions needed to focus on page-to-page stories rather than pinups led McFarlane to create a five-page Coyote sample that he initially sent to Uncanny X-Men editor Ann Nocenti at Marvel Comics, who passed it along to Archie Goodwin and Jo Duffy, the editors of the Marvel imprint Epic Comics, which published Coyote; these in turn passed it onto Coyote creator Steve Englehart, who contacted McFarlane in 1984 with an offer for Todd's first comic job: a backup story in Coyote #11.

McFarlane soon began drawing for both DC and Marvel, with his first major body of work being a two-year run (1985–1987) on DC's Infinity, Inc. In 1987, McFarlane illustrated the last three issues of Detective Comics' four-issue "Batman: Year Two" storyline. From there, he moved to Marvel's Incredible Hulk, which he drew from 1987 to 1988, working with writer Peter David. He also drew two issues of G.I. Joe: A Real American Hero for Marvel, although only one issue (#60) was published with his artwork. His pencils for issue #61 would eventually be published as G.I. Joe Special #1 in 1995.

==== The Amazing Spider-Man ====
In 1988, McFarlane joined writer David Michelinie on Marvel's The Amazing Spider-Man, beginning with issue 298, drawing the preliminary sketch for that cover's image on the back of one of his Incredible Hulk pages. McFarlane garnered notice for the more dynamic poses in which he depicted Spider-Man's aerial web-swinging, his enlarging of the eyes on the character's mask, and the greater detail in which he rendered his artwork—in particular, the elaborate detail he gave to Spider-Man's webbing. Whereas it had previously been rendered as essentially a series of X's between two lines, McFarlane embellished it by detailing far more individual strands, which came to be dubbed "spaghetti webbing". (McFarlane was possibly influenced by artist Arthur Adams, whose visual conception of Spider-Man with a large-eyed mask, webbing with more detailed strands, and more contorted poses while web-swinging, can be seen in Web of Spider-Man Annual #2, published in June 1986 – approximately 1½ years before McFarlane's first published Spider-Man work.) McFarlane drew the first full appearance of Eddie Brock, the original incarnation of the villain Venom. He has been credited as the character's co-creator, though this has been a topic of dispute within the comic book industry (see Eddie Brock: Creation and conception).

McFarlane's work on Amazing Spider-Man made him an industry superstar. His cover art for Amazing Spider-Man No. 313, for which he was originally paid $700 in 1989, for example, later sold for $71,200 in 2010. One critic of McFarlane's detail-heavy style was Comics Journal editor Gary Groth, who said of McFarlane in a 2017 interview, "He doesn't have any authentic virtues as a visual stylist. His work is so overembellished that it disguises the fact that the composition is chaotic and cluttered to the point of being almost unreadable. He never really learned the craft of comics — he just faked it really well."

During his run on The Amazing Spider-Man, McFarlane became increasingly dissatisfied with the lack of control over his work, as he wanted more say in the direction of storylines. He began to miss deadlines, requiring guest artists to fill in for him on some issues. In 1990, after a 28-issue run of Amazing Spider-Man, McFarlane told editor Jim Salicrup that he wanted to write his own stories, and would be leaving the book with issue No. 328, which was part of that year's company-wide "Acts of Vengeance" crossover storyline. In July 2012 the original artwork to that issue's cover, which features Spider-Man dispatching the Hulk, sold for a record-breaking $657,250 USD, the highest auction price ever for any piece of American comic book art. McFarlane was succeeded on Amazing Spider-Man by McFarlane's future fellow Image Comics co-founder Erik Larsen.

==== New Spider-Man title ====
McFarlane's cover for Marvel's Spider-Man No. 1 (August 1990)

Wanting to appease McFarlane, Marvel gave McFarlane a new, adjectiveless Spider-Man title for him to both write and draw. Spider-Man #1 (August 1990) sold 2.5 million copies, largely due to the variant covers with which Marvel, seeking to capitalize on McFarlane's popularity, published the issue to encourage collectors into buying more than one edition. This practice was a result of the comics speculator bubble of the 1990s, which would burst later that decade. McFarlane, unbeknownst to his parents at the time, was making about a million dollars a year. McFarlane wrote and illustrated 15 of the series' first 16 issues, many issues of which featured other popular Marvel characters such as Wolverine and Ghost Rider in guest roles.

Despite his acclaim as an artist, according to David Wallace of Comics Bulletin, many found McFarlane's writing to be "clumsy, unsophisticated and pretentious," and questioned the wisdom of allowing him to write a new Spider-Man title in the first place. At the same time, the editorial had problems with the dark tone of the stories McFarlane was telling, beginning with the inaugural "Torment" storyline, which depicted a more vicious version of the reptilian villain Lizard under the control of the voodoo priestess Calypso. Subsequent storylines such as "Masques" featured Spider-Man confronting the demonic Hobgoblin, while "Perceptions," which involved Spider-Man dealing with police corruption, child rape, and murder (a hint of the work he would later do on Spawn), led some stores to refuse to stock the book. This created further tensions between McFarlane and the editorial, which viewed Spider-Man as a historically light-hearted character, marketed to young readers. Editor, Jim Salicrup, in particular, was required to make a number of compromises for McFarlane's work, including enforcing his minor costume changes across the entire line of other Spidey comics, placing limitations on his choice of villains for his stories, and dealing with strong disagreement on the handling of Mary Jane Watson. This strained McFarlane's relationship with Salicrup, which was expressed in the remarkable amount of public disagreement that appeared on the book's letters page. Eventually, McFarlane's attention to his deadlines, again, began to waver, and he missed issue 15 of the title. His final issue on the book, #16 (November 1991), was part of a crossover storyline with X-Force, and led to creative clashes with new editor Danny Fingeroth. According to McFarlane and editor, Tom DeFalco, in the 2000 documentary, The Devil You Know: Inside the Mind of Todd McFarlane, among the examples of the issues that prompted his departure were editorial's censorship of a panel in that issue in which the character, Juggernaut was graphically stabbed in the eye with a sword. DeFalco supported the editing of the panel, calling it "inappropriate," while McFarlane called this "lunacy," arguing that such graphic visuals are commonplace in Marvel's books. Fed up with editorial interference, he left the company under something of a cloud. According to Wallace, "McFarlane's fifteen issues of Spider-Man are now (perhaps slightly unfairly) held up alongside the likes of X-Force as the epitome of everything wrong in 1990's comics, and their cash-in approach to the then-booming speculator market precipitated the near-collapse of the industry."

=== Image Comics ===
McFarlane then teamed with six other popular artists to form Image Comics, an umbrella company under which each owned a publishing house. McFarlane's studio, Todd McFarlane Productions, Inc. (TMP), published his creation, the occult-themed Spawn, written and drawn by McFarlane. It was Image's second release, following the release of Rob Liefeld's Youngblood the month prior. Upon its release in 1992, Spawn #1 (May 1992) sold 1.7 million copies; as of 2007, this remains a record for an independent comic book.

The cover of Spawn #1 (1992)

Responding to harsh criticism of his abilities as a writer, McFarlane hired acclaimed writers to guest-write issues #8–11, including Alan Moore, Neil Gaiman, Dave Sim, and Frank Miller. Subsequent writers he would hire on the series included Grant Morrison, Andrew Grossberg, and Tom Orzechowski. Greg Capullo penciled several issues as a guest artist, and became the regular penciler with #26, with McFarlane remaining as writer and inker until #70. The series continued to be a hit, and in 1993 Wizard declared Spawn "the best-selling comic on a consistent basis that is currently being published." Spawn is notable for being one of only two Image books that debuted during the company's 1992 launch, along with Erik Larsen's Savage Dragon, that continued to be published into the 2020s.

During Image's early years of operation, the company was subject to much industry criticism over aspects of its business practices, including late-shipped books, and its creators' emphasis on art over writing. One of these critics was McFarlane's former Hulk collaborator, writer Peter David. This came to a head during a public debate they participated in at Philadelphia's Comicfest convention in October 1993, which was moderated by artist George Pérez. McFarlane stated that Image was not being treated fairly by the media, and by David in particular. The three judges, Maggie Thompson, editor of the Comics Buyer's Guide, William Christensen of Wizard Press, and John Danovich of the magazine Hero Illustrated, voted 2–1 in favor of David, with Danovich voting the debate a tie.

In 1994, McFarlane and DC Comics collaborated on an intercompany crossover, each producing a book featuring Batman and Spawn. The first of the two books, Batman-Spawn: War Devil was written by Doug Moench, Chuck Dixon, and Alan Grant, drawn by Klaus Janson, and published by DC. It was followed by Spawn/Batman, which was written by Frank Miller and drawn by McFarlane. That year marked the point when McFarlane ceased to be the regular writer and artist of Spawn. The first issue that he did not draw was issue 16, which was drawn by Greg Capullo. Aside from the four fill-in writers on issues #8–11, it was the first issue on which McFarlane was not the regular writer, as it was the first of a three-issue storyline written by Grant Morrison. Over the ensuing decades, he would hire other writers such as Brian Holguin and David Hine, and artists such as Whilce Portacio, Angel Medina, and Philip Tan. McFarlane occasionally offered story input and inked covers. He would sporadically return as the interior artist for intermittent issues, and for a few years wrote it under a pseudonym to generate interest in the book by fostering the illusion that new talent was being brought into the book's production.

In 2006, McFarlane announced plans for Spawn/Batman with artist Greg Capullo, which McFarlane wrote and inked, and which paid tribute to Jack Kirby. He also began taking an active role in comics publishing again, publishing collections of his Spawn comics in trade paperback form. Spawn Collection Volume 1 collecting issues 1–12 minus issue 9 (due to royalty issues with Neil Gaiman) and 10 (due to a vow he made to Sim) was released in December 2005. The first volume achieved moderate success, ranking 17 in the top one hundred graphic novels, with pre-order sales of 3,227 for that period.

In 2008, McFarlane returned to co-plot the series with returning writer Brian Holguin, with issue 185. The book survived the comics speculator bubble's crash, but its sales have fluctuated, never matching the sales figures of the 1990s. Though it continues publication, its appearance on the Diamond Top 300 chart has been intermittent since the mid-2000s. Nonetheless, Shea Hennum of Paste magazine has observed of the series, "It's a book that, for a time, people continued to buy because of the character instead of the creator. It has become as much of an institution as it is a comic.

Haunt, an ongoing series co-created by McFarlane and Robert Kirkman, was announced in 2007 and launched on October 7, 2009. The comic was initially written by Kirkman, penciled by Ryan Ottley, and inked by McFarlane, with Greg Capullo providing layouts. McFarlane contributed pencils to some issues, and co-wrote issue 28, the series finale, with Joe Casey, who took over writing duties from Kirkman.

In 2019, McFarlane wrote and drew Spawn #301, surpassing Dave Sim's 300-issue series Cerebus as the longest-running creator-owned comics series. The book, released on October 2 of that year, earned McFarlane a place in the Guinness World Records, for which McFarlane was given a certificate on October 5, 2019 at the New York Comic Con, prior to his panel, "The Road to Historic Spawn 300 and 301." At San Diego Comic-Con 2022, it was announced that McFarlane would write a new Batman/Spawn crossover, with Greg Capullo as artist, and a release date of December 2022.

=== Todd McFarlane Entertainment ===
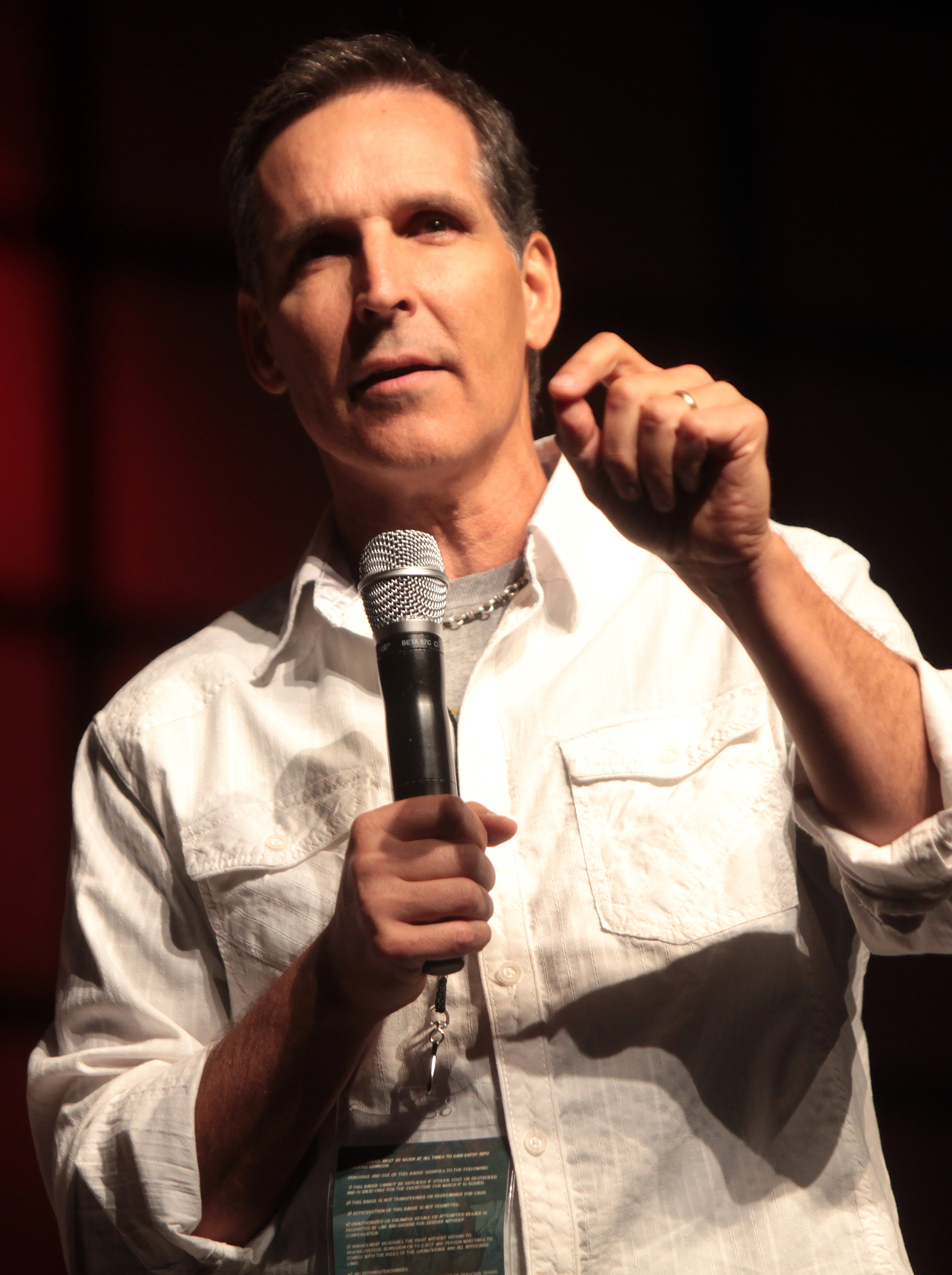
McFarlane speaking at the Phoenix Comicon in Phoenix, Arizona

Todd McFarlane Productions published multiple Spawn spin-offs and mini-series. He increasingly concentrated his attention on those other ventures, which resulted in more sporadic work as an illustrator. In 1994, McFarlane created a toy company, Todd Toys, initially to merchandise collectible action figures of the Spawn characters. In three months, the company sold more than 2.2 million of the action figures nationwide. After Mattel sent a cease-and-desist order based on a male doll in Mattel's Barbie line named Todd, McFarlane changed the company name to McFarlane Toys. The company's line of figures quickly expanded to those of popular cultural icons, such as members of the band Kiss, characters from the film franchise Texas Chainsaw Massacre, TV series such as The X-Files, and sports figures such as Terrell Owens. In 1999, the company sold over 6 million action figures. As of 2017, the company was the fifth-largest action-figure manufacturer in the United States.

Todd McFarlane produced the album art for Iced Earth's 1996 Spawn-based concept album The Dark Saga and Korn's 1998 third studio album Follow the Leader.

That same year, McFarlane founded Todd McFarlane Entertainment, a film and animation studio. In collaboration with New Line Cinema, it produced the 1997 Spawn film and a new Spawn movie, planned in 2008. Spawn, while critically panned, was a modest box office success, earning $54.8 million domestically, and almost $33 million worldwide, against a $40 million budget. Todd McFarlane Entertainment also produced the animated series Todd McFarlane's Spawn, (featuring voice work by actor Keith David) which aired on HBO from 1997 until 1999. Ed Bark of The Dallas Morning News called the series a "very unpleasant viewing experience" and asked "why anyone would want to subject themselves to such a relentlessly grim, gruesome dehumanizing experience." Nonetheless, the animated series won a 1998 Primetime Emmy Award for Outstanding Achievement in Animation.

The studio produced a number of music videos and other animations, including:

- 1998: "Do the Evolution" by Pearl Jam – Rolling Stone included this video in its 2012 list of The Greatest Animated Music Videos.
- 1999: "Freak on a Leash" by KoЯn – This video debuted at number eight on MTV's Total Request Live on February 9, 1999, and peaking at number 1 on its thirteenth day, February 25. and spent ten non-consecutive days at the top position until its "retirement", on May 11, 1999. The video won the Grammy Award for Best Short Form Music Video and the 1999 Metal Edge Readers' Choice Award for Music Video of the Year. It was also nominated for a 1999 MTV Video Music Award.
- 2002: The Dangerous Lives of Altar Boys – McFarlane produced the animated sequences in this film by Peter Care, in which the main characters, Tim and Francis, imagine themselves as muscle-bound warriors. Although the consensus at Rotten Tomatoes was equivocal of the sequences' effectiveness, Armond White of New York Press singled them out for praise.
- 2002: "Breath" – In December of this year, Todd McFarlane directed the music video "Breath" for Canadian hip-hop group Swollen Members featuring Nelly Furtado. The song reached #1 on MuchMusic Countdown and won Best Rap Video at the 2003 MuchMusic Video Awards.
- 2006: "Land of Confusion" by Disturbed – McFarlane, who worked with Greg Capullo on the art for the 2005 album Ten Thousand Fists, also created the animated video for the band's cover of Genesis' 1986 single, "Land of Confusion".
- 2022: "Patient Number 9" by Ozzy Osbourne - Co-directed with M. Wartella.

October 2003 saw the release of Swollen Members album Heavy, with Canadian and United States covers that were both illustrated by McFarlane.

On July 21, 2011, at San Diego Comic-Con, McFarlane and Stan Lee debuted their new comic, Blood Red Dragon. The series is a collaboration with musician Yoshiki and stars a fictionalized version of him.

McFarlane and Boston Red Sox pitcher Curt Schilling formed the gaming studio 38 Studios (formerly Green Monster Games), to produce role-playing games, with McFarlane overseeing art direction.

In February 2012, the company released its only title, Kingdoms of Amalur: Reckoning, a single-player action role-playing game that was a moderate success, but by late May 2012, the company had ceased operation, due to financial difficulties for which it had filed for bankruptcy.

McFarlane was one of several artists to illustrate a variant cover for Kirkman's The Walking Dead No. 100, which was released July 11, 2012, at San Diego Comic-Con.

In July 2017, Blumhouse Productions announced McFarlane would direct King Spawn. McFarlane had by then written a first-draft script. In May 2018, it was announced that Jamie Foxx would portray the titular character. In July 2018, it was reported that Jeremy Renner would be starring alongside Foxx as Detective Twitch. On October 25, 2018, filming was set to begin in June 2019, but was eventually delayed to a later date. In August 2021, it was reported that Broken City screenwriter Brian Tucker had been hired to rewrite McFarlane's screenplay. In October 2022, The Hollywood Reporter stated that Scott Silver, Malcolm Spellman, and Matthew Mixon had been hired to pen a new draft on the screenplay, and that Renner's continued involvement depended on the new draft's outcome. McFarlane expressed doubts about directing the film himself.

In November 2021, McFarlane launched a dedicated television development and production arm of his McFarlane Films, which has signed a first-look deal with production company wiip. As of November 2021, the company has three shows in development: a Spawn spin-off Sam & Twitch; the stop-motion, animated event series McFarland; and a live-action adaptation of the Sean Lewis comic Thumbs.

== Sports ==
In 1998, McFarlane, an avid baseball fan, paid $2.6 million USD at auction for the baseball that St. Louis Cardinals first baseman Mark McGwire hit for his then record-breaking 70th home run, and $175,000 for Sammy Sosa's 66th home run ball.

In June 2003, McFarlane paid about $517,500 at auction for San Francisco Giants left fielder Barry Bonds' October 2001, record-breaking 73rd home run ball. The auction took place at the ESPN Zone in New York's Times Square and was featured live on SportsCenter. When asked by Time magazine's Michael Grunwald in a 2007 interview if he was interested in Bonds' record 756th career home run ball, McFarlane indicated that he was more interested in Bonds' last home run ball.

McFarlane is a former minority owner of the Edmonton Oilers and designed the logo used on the team's alternate third jersey, which debuted in 2001 and was worn through 2007. The Oilers returned to the McFarlane design in 2022 as part of the league's Reverse Retro jersey program.

== Other media ==
=== Video games ===
Spawn appears as a guest character in Mortal Kombat 11 and the Xbox version of Soulcalibur II. McFarlane also designed the unique character Necrid for the game.

A PlayStation 2 game, McFarlane's Evil Prophecy, was released in 2004 by Konami. In it, players battle creatures based on a line of Todd McFarlane's action figures including classic movie monsters such as Frankenstein's monster and Dracula.

In January 2005, McFarlane announced that he was set to produce a half-hour anthology television series for Fox called Twisted Tales, based on the Bruce Jones' comic book to which McFarlane had purchased the rights.

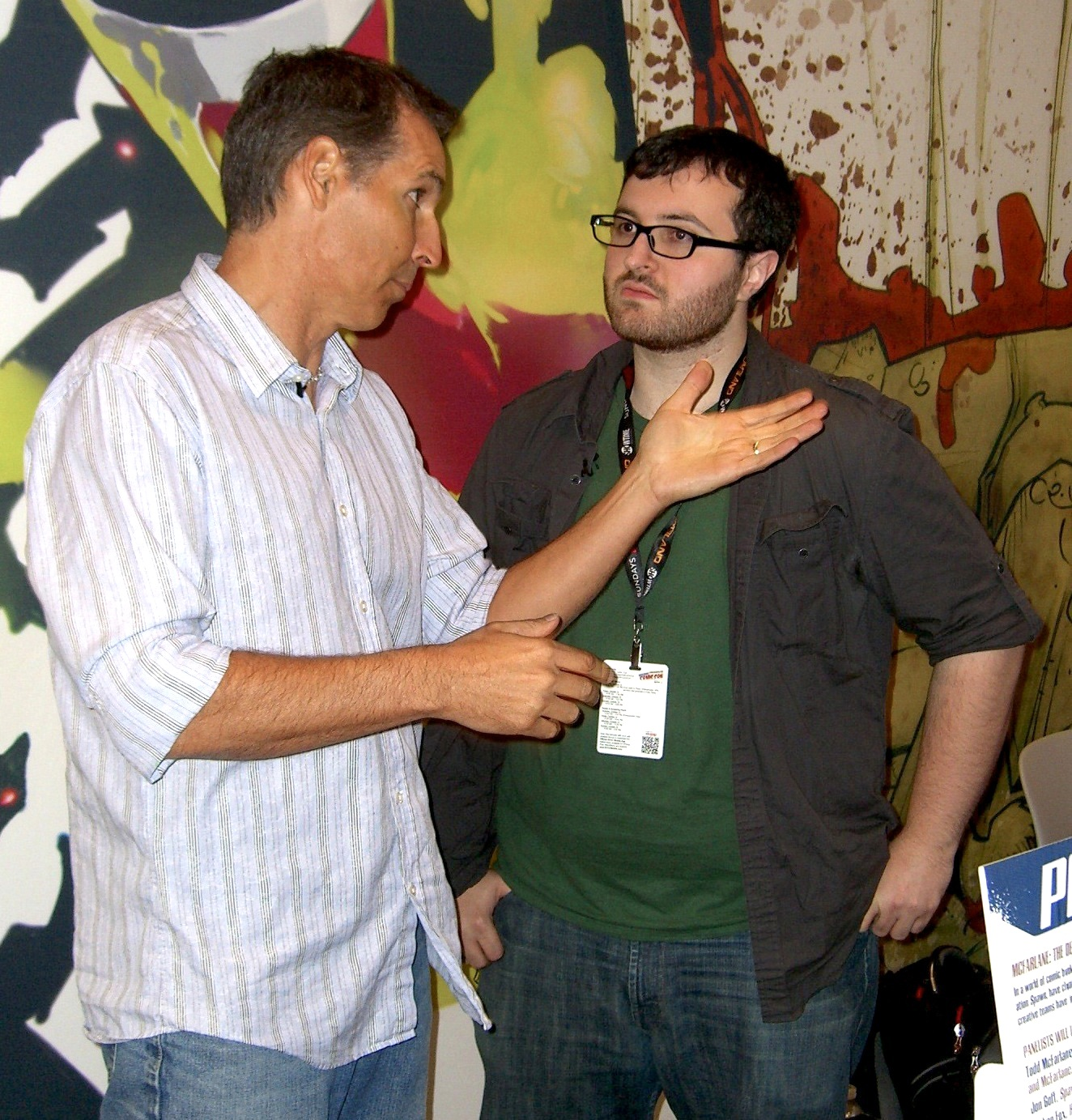
McFarlane at the Image Comics booth at the 2011 New York Comic Con

For the release of the video game Halo 3, McFarlane was enlisted to design a series of action figures.

In 2011, McFarlane was hired as an artist for the game Kingdoms of Amalur: Reckoning, on which his duties included key frame art, storyboards and directing. He also worked on the cancelled Project Copernicus by the same developer.

=== Media about McFarlane ===
Stan Lee interviewed McFarlane in Episode 1 of the 1991 documentary series The Comic Book Greats. In 2000, McFarlane was the subject of a National Film Board of Canada documentary Devil You Know: Inside the Mind of Todd McFarlane, directed by Kenton Vaughan. The film first aired on CBC-TV's Life and Times biography series on January 9, 2001.

In "Spidey Cents", a fourth-season episode of the History reality television series Pawn Stars which aired in May 2011, a man tries to sell McFarlane's original artwork for page 25 of The Amazing Spider-Man No. 316 (June 1989) for $20,000 to the Gold & Silver Pawn Shop in Las Vegas. Because the seller lacked the paperwork authenticating the artwork, the Gold & Silver manager Corey Harrison would only pay $1,000 for the page, an offer that the seller declined.

== Legal issues ==
McFarlane lost judgments in two lawsuits in the 2000s. The first was a 2002 suit in which McFarlane contested with writer Neil Gaiman over the rights to some supporting Spawn characters created by Gaiman in issue No. 9 of the Spawn series and over payment for later works featuring those characters. In 1997, the two signed a deal in which Gaiman would give his share of characters Angela, Medieval Spawn and Cogliostro to McFarlane in exchange for McFarlane's share of British superhero Marvelman (in reality, what McFarlane owned were two trademarks for Miracleman logos, not the character, which would become clear only after the lawsuit concluded). This deal was broken by McFarlane, which motivated Gaiman to start the lawsuit. The jury was unanimous in favor of Gaiman. The two were involved in a lengthy dispute over ownership of Miracleman, but no lawsuit has been filed in that dispute. In 2009, Marvel Comics resolved the matter by purchasing the property. The creators settled their dispute over the Spawn characters in January 2012. The exact terms of the settlement were not disclosed, though Gaiman retained ownership of Angela, as she became a character in the Marvel Universe when Gaiman began doing work for Marvel in 2013. Bleeding Cool later confirmed that Marvel Comics had completely bought the rights to Angela from Gaiman.

Another suit in which McFarlane became embroiled was a December 2004 suit in which hockey player Tony Twist sued McFarlane because he named a mobster character in Spawn after Twist. After a jury initially found McFarlane liable for $24.5 million in damages (reduced to $15 million on appeal), the lawsuit was later settled out of court for $5 million.

In 2012, McFarlane sued his former friend and employee, Al Simmons, from whom the name of Spawn's alter ego was derived. According to a lawsuit lodged in Arizona federal court, the real Al Simmons published a book called The Art of Being Spawn, in which Simmons purportedly suggests that his own life was the inspiration for the Spawn character. McFarlane's position was that Simmons violated the terms of his employment pact and breached his duty of loyalty. The lawsuit was settled in December 2012 when McFarlane agreed with Simmons. The terms of any settlement were not made public.

== Awards and recognition ==
McFarlane's has won numerous awards, including:

- 1992 National Cartoonists Society Award for Best Comic Book
- 1992 Inkpot Award
- 2000 Grammy Award for Best Short Form Music Video for "Freak on a Leash"
- National Football League's 2005 Artist of the Year Award, for his work on program covers for the Baltimore Ravens
- Induction into the Canadian Comic Book Creator Hall of Fame, on June 18, 2011, at the Joe Shuster Awards in Calgary, Alberta, Canada
- In 2013 McFarlane was invited to deliver the keynote speech at one of two graduation ceremonies at his alma mater, Eastern Washington University.

== Personal life ==
McFarlane and his wife Wanda married in 1985. They stayed in Spokane, Washington until 1986, when they moved to Vancouver, British Columbia. They later moved to Portland, Oregon, and then to the Ahwatukee Foothills of Phoenix, Arizona, where they continue to live as of 2007. There, they raised their three children: Cyan, Kate, and Jake. Cyan's love of the TV series Lost inspired her father's decision to produce action figures based on that show, while Kate voiced the young Cyan in the animated Spawn TV series. McFarlane's offices are located near Phoenix. In Spawn, the characters Wanda Blake and Cyan Fitzgerald were named after McFarlane's own wife and daughter respectively.

McFarlane stated in a 1992 interview that he was an atheist. He does not consume alcohol, coffee, or tea.

== Bibliography ==
=== Awesome Comics ===
Cover art

- Prophet #1 (Vol. 3) (Variant) (2000)

=== DC Comics ===
- All-Star Squadron #47 (with Mike Clark) (1985)
- Detective Comics #576–578 ("Batman: Year Two") (1987)
- Infinity, Inc #14–37 (full art); Annual #1–2 (among other artists) (1985–1987)
- Invasion!, miniseries, #1–2 (1989)
- The Sandman #50 (pin-up) (1989)
- Superman Special #1 (one-page pin-up) (1992)

Cover art

- Batman #423 (cover)
- Wildcats #1B (2006 2nd Series DC)

=== Disney ===
Cover Art

- Prince of Persia Before the Sandstorm #1 GN (2010)

=== Image Comics ===
==== Art ====
- Cyberforce #8 (1994)
- Haunt #1–18 (inks only) (2009–2011)
- Image Comics Summer Special #1 (2004)
- Image Comics Hardcover (Spawn story) (2005)
- Image United #1–3 (2009–2010)
- Spawn #1–15, 21–24 (full art); #26–34, 50 (along with Greg Capullo) (1992–1995); #190, 200 (among other artists) (2010)
- Spawn/Batman (1994)

Cover art

- Badrock (1995) #1A (inks only)
- Batman/Spawn (2022)
- Black Flag Preview Edition #1 (1994) (inks only)
- Cyber Force #8 (1994)
- Reborn #1H (2016)
- The Crow #1B (2013)
- The Darkness #100B (2012)
- The Infinite #1D, 2E (2011) (inks only)
- Walking Dead #100D (2003)
- Youngblood #100 (2026) (variant cover) (inks only)

==== Writing ====
- Batman/Spawn (2022)
- Sam and Twitch #21-16 (2001-2004)
- Savior #1–8 (2015)
- Spawn #1–7, 12–15, 21–150 (1992–2005); 185–current (2008–present)
- Spawn Kills Everyone #1 (2016)
- Spawn Kills Everyone Too #1–4 (2018–2019)
- Gunslinger Spawn #1–current (2021–present)
- King Spawn #1–current (2021–present) (additional script and dialogue)
- Spawn: Misery #1-4 (2024)

=== Marvel ===
==== Art ====
- The Amazing Spider-Man #298–323, 325, 328 (1988–1990)
- Coyote #11–14 (1985)
- Daredevil #241 (1987)
- G.I. Joe: A Real American Hero #60 (1987)
- G.I. Joe Special #1 (1995)
- The Incredible Hulk #330–334, 336–346 (1987–1988)
- Marvel Holiday Special (Spider-Man) 2004
- The Spectacular Spider-Man Annual #10 (1990)
- Spider-Man #1–14, 16 (1990–1991)
- Spitfire and the Troubleshooters #4 (1987)
- What The--?! #3 (1988)

Cover art

- The Amazing Spider-Man #324 (1989)
- The Amazing Spider-Man: Skating on Thin Ice #1 (1993)
- Conan the Barbarian #241 (1991)
- Marvel Comics Presents #32 (1988)
- Marvel Age #90 (1990)
- Marvel Tales #223–239 (1989–1990)
- The New Mutants #85–89, 93 (1990) (inks only)
- Quasar #14 (1990)
- Return of Wolverine (2018 Marvel) #1I, 1J
- The Olympians #1 (1991) (Epic; cover only)
- X-Factor #50 (1990) (cover only)
- X-Force #1E (2019)

==== Writing ====
- Spider-Man #1–14, 16 (1990–1991)

Preceded by Don Newton	Infinity, Inc. artist 1985–1987	Succeeded by Vince Argondezzi
Preceded by Al Milgrom	The Incredible Hulk artist 1987–1988	Succeeded by Jeff Purves
Preceded by Alex Saviuk	The Amazing Spider-Man artist 1988–1990	Succeeded by Erik Larsen
Preceded by N/A	Spider-Man writer/artist 1990–1991	Succeeded by Erik Larsen
Preceded by N/A	Spawn artist 1992–1995	Succeeded by Greg Capullo
Preceded by N/A	Spawn writer 1992–2005, 2008–	Succeeded by David Hine
