= Batman/Spawn: War Devil =

1994 US comic book

- Cover of Batman/Spawn: War Devil (spring 1994), art by Klaus Janson

Publication information
- Publisher: DC Comics
- Format: One-shot
- Genre: Superhero
- Publication date: 1994
- No. of issues: 1
- Main character(s): Batman; Spawn

Creative team
- Written by: Doug Moench, Chuck Dixon, Alan Grant
- Artist: Klaus Janson

Batman/Spawn: War Devil is a 1994 one-shot comic book published by DC Comics and written by Doug Moench, Alan Grant, and Chuck Dixon. This is one of two such crossovers between the two characters published that year (the other one being Image Comics' Spawn/Batman). The book, along with Spawn/Batman, was reprinted as Batman/Spawn: The Classic Collection on November 15, 2022. In 2022, a third crossover titled simply Batman/Spawn was published.

== Plot ==
The saga of Virginia Dare and the Roanoke Colony is retold. Matches Malone is looking for clues on a missing man named Virgil Dare. Batman follows Dare to Gotham Tower, a building project led by Simon Vesper, a man murdered by Spawn. Batman finds Dare and learns that he is working to fulfill Vesper's plans. Vesper reappears the day before opening ceremonies. Vesper attacks and kills Dare making a pentagram with his blood and spelling out "Croatoan" above it. Batman and Spawn briefly fight, with Batman coming out on top. Batman and Spawn begin working together to solve the mystery. Gotham Tower lights up brightly and a pentagram of burning buildings starts while the rest of Gotham goes dark. Gotham's dead rise. Batman confronts Vesper at his building's opening ceremonies. Vesper is actually "the demon Croatoan", working for Satan to collect souls for the devil's army. Spawn battles Croatoan but is overpowered. Batman helps Spawn just in time and Spawn defeats Croatoan. The dead return to their graves and the doorway to Hell is closed. Inspired by Batman's actions, Spawn chooses to use his powers for the greater good.

== Batman/Spawn (2022) ==
A third meeting between the two characters and a sequel to Spawn/Batman, which was going to be titled Spawn/Batman: Inner Demons and would have pitted Batman and Spawn against the Joker and Clown, was announced but never published.

In December 2022, a third intercompany crossover between Batman and Spawn was published. Though the series could have been released as a mini-series it was ultimately released as a one-shot special. The one-shot was written by Todd McFarlane and artist Greg Capullo.
