= Tom Orzechowski =

American comic book letterer

- Born: Thomas Paul Orzechowski; March 1, 1953 (age 73) Michigan, U.S.
- Area: Letterer
- Pseudonym: Orz
- Notable works: Uncanny X-Men; Spawn
- Awards: Inkpot Award (1985); Wizard Fan Award (1993); Harvey Award (1994); CBG Fan Award (1988, 1991–93)

Thomas Paul Orzechowski (/ɔːrzəˈtʃaʊski/; born March 1, 1953) is an American comic book letterer, primarily known for his work on Uncanny X-Men. Over the course of Orzechowski's career, he has lettered around 6,000 pages of long-time X-Men writer Chris Claremont's scripts.

== Career ==
=== Early work ===
In 1968, when Orzechowski was 15, he met a group of aspiring comic book artists at the Detroit Triple Fan Fair comic convention, and joined their comics club. Some older members of the club included future comics professionals Rich Buckler, Jim Starlin, Al Milgrom, and Mike Vosburg. An aspiring comic book artist, Orzechowski quit drawing when he saw their work. None of the club members wanted to letter their own amateur comics, however, so Orzechowski took on those jobs.

Tony Isabella, who knew Orzechowski from the comics club, joined Marvel Comics in 1972, and soon got Orzechowski his first professional work, lettering retouches on the Marvel UK editions of classic Fantastic Four, Thor, Hulk, The Amazing Spider-Man, and Daredevil stories. Within a few months, Orzechowski had worked his way up to lettering for some of Marvel's black-and-white monster magazines. One of his first jobs of that kind was for Monsters Unleashed, on one of the first Marvel stories written by future X-Men scribe Chris Claremont.

Orzechowski's connections from the comics club days paid off again when Rich Buckler pulled him over to letter Black Panther (Jungle Action), and Jim Starlin did the same for Starlin's run on Captain Marvel.

Having moved to California by this time, Orzechowski lettered a number of underground comix titles in the mid-to-late 1970s.

=== X-Men ===
Two panels from Uncanny X-Men #141 (1981), p. 12, displaying a variety of Tom Orzechowski's lettering techniques.

By the time of the debut of the New X-Men in X-Men #94, Orzechowski had developed a reputation as a "new projects guy," and was given the odd issue, and then with issue #122 (June 1979) finally the title. After a number of years on X-Men over Chris Claremont's scripts, the two men paired together on many future X-Men-related projects. (Orzechowski also designed the logos for The New Mutants and Wolverine comics, among others.)

When all was said and done, counting X-Men, many of its annuals, The New Mutants, Wolverine, X-Treme X-Men, and MekaniX, Orzechowksi lettered something on the order of 6,000 pages of Claremont's scripts over a 25-year period.

=== Post-X-Men ===
Orzechowski left the X-Men books shortly after Chris Claremont, in 1993. He joined the team putting out Image Comics' Spawn 1992, as a copy editor for most of its first six years. Orzechowski worked for the manga packaging outfit Studio Proteus from 1989 until its demise in 2004. Studio Proteus titles on which Orzechowski worked include Nausicaä, Appleseed, Dominion, and Ghost in the Shell.

In the early 2000s, with many publishers beginning to use "in-house" lettering teams, freelancers like Orzechowski lost a lot of work. Though Orzechowski still does the occasional job for DC Comics and manga company Studio Cutie, he did not letter comic books regularly until 2009, when he started lettering for Chris Claremont's X-Men Forever books, and in 2010 for the New Mutants Forever book, also written by Claremont.

As of 2022, Orzechowski has been working on a comic book anthology called YEET Presents.

== Lettering style and influences ==
Orzechowski's letters are almost perfectly square, with the exception of the letter "I." Everything has a solid, uniform look to it. Letters stand straight up and down, not at a tilt. They are all painstakingly the same height. Similarly, Orzechowski's standard word balloon outlines are meticulously uniform. He also helped popularize non-standard (non-bubble-shaped) designs for word balloons, to reflect different character voices (square for robots, jagged/dripping for demons, etc.). In the mid-1970s, while Marvel's production boss and cover letterer Dan Crespi was developing a tight, attractive house style, Orzechowski was 3,000 miles away in California, "buried in design books." Orzechowski figured that "since the X-Men didn't overlap the rest of the Marvel Universe," there was no reason not to be influenced by calligraphy, record jackets, old movie posters – everything except comics.

Early influences on Orzechowski's distinctive style included the work of Alphonse Mucha, and the comics lettering of Artie Simek and Abe Kanegson. Orzechowski modeled his lettering on the Flash Gordon newspaper strips of the 1930s. Another influence was Robert Crumb's Zap Comix: Orzechowski recognized that Crumb's title work was clearly derived from the brush techniques of that same era, the 1920s and '30s. Orzechowski studied everything of Crumb's (as well as the late 1960s DCs and Marvels), and developed a lettering style based on all of those influences.

=== Computer lettering ===
In 1992, Orzechowski was among the first letterers to experiment with computer fonts. Working on Studio Proteus's Nausicaä of the Valley of the Wind, Orzechowski found the sound-effect work to be so demanding that computer lettering seemed like a way to save time on the extensive dialogue. His font program, however, was primitive, and he ended up doing that series entirely by hand after all. By 1994, however, Orzechowksi was lettering mainly on the computer, and in 2002 he switched completely to digital lettering, using a Wacom pen on a graphics tablet, in Adobe Illustrator. He explained in a 2003 interview on Comicon.com's The Pulse that "even then [2002] I was losing the knack, as the majority of my work had been digital for a couple of years. The fine motor control slips if the muscles aren't in continual use."

== Personal life ==
Orzechowski is not related to comics artist/designer Bob Orzechowski.

Orzechowski lives in Lakewood, Ohio, where he operates a typography and logo design studio. His wife is L. Lois Buhalis, herself a letterer in the comics industry for two decades.

== Quotes ==
On his favorite lettering projects:

Chris Claremont's Uncanny X-Men was the top of the stack for me. There's no way to describe how it felt to watch those characters evolve under one writer for such a remarkably long spell.

On the toughest parts of hand lettering to master:

Letter "X" is the toughest. Seriously. I‘ve probably drawn “X” more often than anyone in the history of written language, and half of them were lousy. After that, numeral "8" is the one that will give you nightmares. Letters "J," "R" and "S" will show the most variety. I'd bet money I spotted the letterer on the '40s stories in the Black Canary Archive by his "J"s. I'm sure it was Gaspar Saladino, who later worked on all of the late '50s DC hero revivals for Julie Schwartz.

On comic book logo design:

The logo I did for Wolverine is based on 1930s elements, and I'm proud to see it's one of the few old ones still in use. Designing a logo is probably a lot like designing a costume, to catch the tone of the character while pulling some unexpected elements together.
