= List of OverPower card sets =

OverPower is a collectible trading card game developed by Fleer and Marvel in 1995. Several major sets/expansions were produced to provide game cards, which expanded from Marvel characters to include DC Comics and Image Comics characters.

== Marvel OverPower ==
Released middle 1995 by Fleer, composed of 346 cards, being 39 characters, 195 specials (5 for each character), 28 power cards, 42 universe cards and 6 Missions of 7 cards each (42 cards total). Was sold in pre-constructed 62-card decks or 55-card decks, and in either 9-card or 17-card booster packs. Characters: Apocalypse, Beast, Bishop, Cable, Captain America, Carnage, Colossus, Cyclops, Deadpool, Doctor Doom, Doctor Octopus, Elektra, Gambit, Hobgoblin, Hulk, Human Torch, Invisible Woman, Iron Man, Jean Grey, Jubilee, Magneto, Mister Fantastic, Mystique, Omega Red, Professor X, Psylocke, Punisher, Rhino, Rogue, Sabretooth, Silver Surfer, Spider-Man, Spider-Woman, Storm, Thing, Thor, Venom, War Machine and Wolverine. This card set has a smooth finish.

== Powersurge ==
Released late 1995, with 269 cards, being 21 new characters, 163 new specials (6 for each new character, plus 1 for each of the 39 characters from the Overpower original set), 28 power cards (reprints from the previous set), 41 universe cards or the original 42 were reprinted with a purple border - the basic 8F+3 Wolverine was not reprinted in this set) and 2 missions of 7 cards each (14 cards total). There are also two legitimate variants: Longshot Roll with the Punches (1 on second line) and Scarlet Witch Sorceress Slam with the Fighting icon - which would make a complete set 271 cards. Sold in 9-card booster packs. Characters: Banshee, Black Cat, Blob, Daredevil, Doctor Strange, Domino, Ghost Rider, Iceman, Juggernaut, Longshot, Mandarin, Mister Sinister, Mojo, Mysterio, Namor, Scarlet Spider, Scarlet Witch, She-Hulk, Silver Sable, Strong Guy, and Super-Skrull. This card set has a matte finish.

== Mission Control ==
Released early 1996, introduced a new type of card, the events. Composed of 142 cards, being 10 new characters, 68 new specials (6 for each character, plus 8 Any Hero specials), 2 missions of 7 cards each (14 cards total) and 50 events (5 for each mission, including the missions from early sets). Sold in 9-card booster packs. Characters: Black Widow, Brood, Doc Samson, Hawkeye, Morbius, Morph, Nightcrawler, Quicksilver, Sentinels and Vision.

== DC OverPower ==
Released middle 1996, introduced the Intellect Power type. DC also introduced the allies, a new type of universe card, as well as Hero and Villain codes, a concept which was not used extensively in the game and never adopted by any Marvel OverPower expansion. It was composed of 334 cards, being 30 characters, 150 specials (5 for each character), 36 power cards, 70 universe cards, 4 missions of 7 cards each (28 cards total) and 20 events (5 for each mission). Sold in 62-card random decks and 9-cards booster packs.

DC OverPower was also dubbed Batman/Superman OverPower" since all its characters were from these two heroes' storylines.

Characters: Azrael, Bane, Batman, Brainiac, Catwoman, Commissioner Gordon and the GCPD, Cyborg, Doomsday, Eradicator, Hazard, Huntress, Joker, Killer Croc, Knockout, Lex Luthor, Metallo, Metropolis SCU, Nightwing, Parasite, Penguin, Poison Ivy, Ra's al Ghul, Riddler, Robin, Steel, Superboy, Supergirl, Superman, Thorn, and Two-Face.

== IQ OverPower ==
Released late 1996, brought the Intellect Power type to Marvel characters, reprinting all Marvel characters released so far, now with Intellect values. Composed of 279 cards, being 78 characters (8 new and 70 reprints), 172 specials (5 for each new character, 1 or 2 for each character from previous Marvel sets, and 2 Any Character specials), 12 power cards and 17 universe cards. Sold in 15-card booster packs. New characters: Forge, Green Goblin, Hank Pym, Kingpin, Nick Fury, Red Skull, Shadowcat, and White Queen.

== JLA OverPower ==
(JLA stands for Justice League of America) - Released early 1997, introduced the new tactic cards. 197 cards, being 20 characters, 134 specials (5 for each character of JLA Overpower, 1 for each character of DC OverPower, and 4 Any Character), 1 power card, 15 universe ally cards, 14 tactic double shot cards, 1 mission of 7 cards and 6 events (5 for the mission and 1 Any Mission event). Sold in 15-card booster packs. Characters: Aquaman, Black Canary, Blue Beetle, Booster Gold, Captain Atom, Captain Marvel, Darkseid, Doctor Polaris, The Flash, Green Arrow, Green Lantern, Hawkman, Martian Manhunter, Mister Miracle, Neron, Orion, Parallax, Ray, Trickster, and Wonder Woman.

== Monumental OverPower ==
Released middle 1997, made "team characters" a major game concept (though this was not the first OverPower appearance of "team characters", as they had already appeared in DC OverPower with the release of Commissioner Gordon and the GCPD and Metropolis SCU, and even earlier in Mission Control with the release of the Brood and the Sentinels), character cards that represented a team, while its specials represented the members of that team. Monumental also introduced the location cards, that added new mechanics to the game. 289 cards, being 22 characters (16 new and 6 reprinted promotional characters), 118 specials (6 for each new character, 1 Any Character, and 21 of the previous Marvel characters also got a new special), 30 locations, 36 power cards (reprints with new artwork), 26 universe cards, 20 tactic cards, 2 missions of 7 cards each (14 cards total) and 23 events (6 for each new mission and 1 for each of the previous missions). Sold in 65-card random decks and 15-card booster packs. Some cards, like the missions, were only available in decks. New Characters: Acolytes, Alpha Flight, Enforcers, The Hand, Hellfire Club, Hydra, Inhumans, Kree, Marauders, Morlocks, New Warriors, Reavers, Serpent Society, Shi'ar, Starjammers, and X-Babies.

== Classic OverPower ==
Released late 1997, introduced the artifacts, a new type of tactic card, and the "variant characters", new versions of already released character cards. Composed of 215 cards, being 32 characters, (24 new and 8 variant), 152 specials (1 Any Character and 6 for each new character except five; three of those five got just 3 specials, the other two have no specials; also, 28 of the previous characters got 1 new special), 5 locations, 1 power card, 24 tactic cards and 1 Any Mission event. Sold in 15-card booster packs. After Classic, Fleer decided not to produce OverPower anymore, and the production passed to Marvel Comics. New Characters: Absorbing Man, Baron Mordo, Beta Ray Bill, Black Panther, Bullseye, Captain Marvel, Dazzler, Deathlok, Dracula, Falcon, Havok, Heroes for Hire, Ka-Zar, Leader, Maggott, Marrow, Mole Man, Psycho-Man, Puppet Master, Cecilia Reyes, Scorpion, Shang-Chi, Superpatriot, and the Thunderbolts.

In addition to the 215 card set there were six promo cards. The six are referred to as the Classic Accidental Inserts. They are all rare to extremely rare. The rarest are the Any Power Teamwork (6A+0+0) picturing Captain America, Spider-Man, and Wolverine; and the Tactic Artifact Avenger's ID Card (6I+5A) picturing the Hulk and Wasp. The next rarest are the Basic Universe (6I+3) Xavier Protocols picturing Professor X with several X-Men in the background on computer screens, including Wolverine; and the Any Character Deal with the Devil picturing Emplate and White Queen. The easiest of these rare cards are the Location Krakoa picturing the X-Men; and the Tactic Artifact picturing Nightcrawler.

== Image OverPower ==
Released middle 1998. Strange as it may seem, the first set released by Marvel Comics introduced characters that, at that time, were published by Image Comics. Composed of 217 cards, being 19 characters, 126 specials (3 Any Character; 6 for each character, Note: Spawn had a promo card (a 7th special) that came in 2 versions (wrong cut - National give-a-way and the Correct cut - Overpower Legion version). and 3 for each Image character of the Marvel vs Wildstorms. OverPower Card Game#Promo Cards promotional set (Future Backlash, Brass, Daemonite Voodoo, and Wynonna Earp, each 3 specials, except Future Backlash with 6), 4 locations, 38 power cards, 13 universe cards, 4 tactic cards, 1 mission of 7 cards and 6 events for that mission. Sold in 60-card random decks and 15-card booster packs. Characters: Backlash, Curse, The Darkness, Fairchild, Grifter, Grunge, Killrazor, Malebolgia, Overtkill, Ripclaw, Savage Dragon, Shadowhawk, Spawn, Stryker, Tiffany, Velocity, Violator, Witchblade, and Zealot.

== X-Men OverPower ==
Released January, 1999 was the second set produced by Marvel, and the last OverPower set ever released. It introduced the aspects, designed to make locations more useful. X-Men Overpower cards were cut incorrectly, being slightly larger than the other cards, which made decks mixing X-Men sets and other sets very hard to shuffle without sleeves. Also, the font used for character's names was different. It contained 200 cards, being 38 characters (26 new and 12 variant), 126 specials (1 Any Character and 5 for each new character except four, that have no specials; also, 15 previous characters got 1 new special), 5 locations, 23 aspects, 4 universe cards and 4 tactic cards. Sold in 15-card booster packs. New Characters: Bastion, Callisto, Captain Britain, Cerebro, Crux, Deathbird, Donald Pierce, Goblyn Queen, Grey King, Landslide, Maverick, Mercury, Multiple Man, Phoenix, Polaris, Rapture, Sabra, Shadow King, Spider-Girl, Sunfire, Taskmaster, Thunderbird, Typhoid Mary, X-Man, X-Men: Original Team, and Xaos.

== Unreleased series ==
Two new expansion sets were planned by Marvel Comics to be released in 1999/2000 to update the game, with new versions of the characters alongside new characters as Angel and Wasp: OverPower: The Marvels (that would have only heroes) and OverPower: Absolute Evil (that would have only villains). These sets were never released, but a complete spoiler for The Marvels somehow spread through the internet.

A third DC expansion was being designed by Fleer before handing the rights over to Marvel Comics. The set was to be titled "Universal Forces" and some pieces of artwork to be used in the set circulated the internet. Locations cards based on DC Comics locations were designed, as well as several new characters including Impulse, Black Lightning, Doctor Fate, Deathstroke, and the Rogues.
