= Robert Olen Butler Prize =

Short fiction prize

The Robert Olen Butler Prize is a prize for short fiction awarded by Del Sol Press in conjunction with Pulitzer Prize-winning novelist Robert Olen Butler, who chooses the winning story. The winning stories are also collected into an annual anthology, The Robert Olen Butler Prize Anthology. As of 2009, three individuals had appeared in the anthology more than once: Jacob M. Appel (2006, 2007, 2008, 2009), Erin Soros (2008, 2009) and Mark Wisniewski (2008, 2009).

The award was conceived by Michael Neff, and has been influential in launching the careers of such writers as Lynn Veach Sadler, Charles Yu, Roy Kesey and Cris Mazza.

== Past winners ==
=== 2005 ===
- Grand Prize: E. R. Catalano "News from My Father"
- Thomas P. Balazs "Omicron Ceti III"
- Ariana-Sophia Kartsonis "Sundress"
- Roy Kesey "Invunche y voladora"
- Gloria DeVidas Kirchheimer "Malika"
- Karen Kovacik "My Polish Widower"
- Dylan Landis "Jazz"
- Kelly Magee "Not People, Not This"
- Lynn Veach Sadler "Miss Spam Maps of Vegas"
- Marianne Taylor "Who is the Hardware"
- Charles Yu "My Last Days as Me"

=== 2006 ===
- Grand Prize: Matthew J. Sullivan "Unfound"
- Cheryl Alu, "Girl"
- Jacob M. Appel, "Shell Game with Organs"
- Kerry Dolan, "Falling Off the George Washington Bridge"
- Alicia Gifford, "Gorgeous World"
- Alison Lee Kinney, "Term"
- Phil LaMarche, "In the Tradition of My Family"
- Cris Mazza, "Our Time Is Up"
- Jeff Parker, "The Taste of Penny"
- Bill Pettitt, "This Is Not About Me"
- Peter Paul Smith, "Kleebe"
- Alia Yunis, "A Nearly Blonde Christmas"

=== 2007 ===
- Grand Prize: Valerie Hurley, “Jasmine, Washing the Hair of Pearsa”
- Jacob Appel, “Enoch Arden’s One Night Stands”
- Stephenie Brown, “The Wheel Wright”
- Lauren Cobb, “No Place”
- Greg Hrbek, “Bereavement”
- LaTanya McQueen, “Once”
- Jamie Pearlberg, “A Wedding Tale”
- Matthew Pitt, “The Mean”
- Scott Winokur, “Hideous Thing”
- Mark Wisniewski, “Prisoners of War”

=== 2008 ===
- Grand Prize: Kimberly Willardson "Winter Memories of the Summer Bear"
- Jacob M. Appel - "Animal Control"
- Miriam Gershow - "Carker"
- Nick Healy - "Joyless Men"
- Brodie Smith - "Watch Him Burn"
- Erin Soros - "The chorus"
- Naomi Williams - "The Report"
- Mark Wisniewski - "Stricken"
- Christina Yu - "Christmas in the Neighborhood"

=== 2009 ===
- Grand Prize: Annie Weatherwax - "The Possibility of Things"
- Jacob M. Appel - "The Appraisal"
- Porter Fox - "Caribou"
- James Gish Jr. - "Wandering Boy"
- Gregory Loselle - "Buried Dinner"
- Geraldine Ann Marshall - "Secrets of Wood"
- Dolen Perkins-Valdez - "The Clipping"
- Michael Schivone - "The Heatseeker"
- Erin Soros - "Surge"
- Shubha Venugopal - "Lalita and the Banyan Tree"
- Mark Wisniewski - "Without Good-byes"

== See also ==
- List of American literary awards
- List of literary awards
