= Veach =

Veach is a surname. Notable people with the surname include:

- Al Veach (1909–1990), American baseball player
- Bobby Veach (1888–1945), American baseball player
- Charles L. Veach (1944–1995), United States Air Force officer and astronaut
- Eric Veach, Canadian computer scientist
- Lynn Veach Sadler, American poet, writer and playwright
- Matt Veach (born 1981), American mixed martial artist
- Peek-A-Boo Veach (1862–1937), American baseball player
- Zach Veach (born 1994), American racing driver
