= Weatherwax =

Weatherwax is a:

Surname:

- Annie Weatherwax, American artist and author
- Frank Weatherwax (1902–1991), American actor and animal trainer
- Ken Weatherwax (1955–2014), American actor
- Marvin Weatherwax Jr., American politician
- Paul Weatherwax, (1900–1960), American cutter
- Paul Weatherwax (botanist), (1888–1976), American professor of botany
- Rudd Weatherwax (1907–1985), American actor, animal trainer, and breeder
- Seema Aissen Weatherwax (1905–2006), a Ukrainian political activist and photographer

Character name:

- Granny Weatherwax, a character from Terry Pratchett's Discworld series
- Galder Weatherwax, a character from Terry Pratchett's novel The Light Fantastic

== See also ==
- Weatherwax Glacier, Antarctica, named for physicist Allan T. Weatherwax
