= Dark Constellations =

2015 novel by Pola Oloixarac

Dark Constellations (Spanish: Las constelaciones oscuras) is a novel by the Argentinian author Pola Oloixarac, published in 2015 by Random House. Roy Kesey's English translation was published by Soho Press in 2019. The novel is told in three parts, each set in a different century. The first part chronicles a 19th-century naturalist discovering a mysterious substance. The second part follows a narrative describing the conception, birth, and childhood of a boy named Cassio Liberman Brandao da Silva in the 1980s. Finally, the story advances to the 2020s and describes Cassio's work with a legendary hacker Max Lambard, culminating in their collaboration with a biologist to create a system that uses DNA to monitor in real-time the movement of every individual on the planet.

The novel crosses together cyberpunk sci-fi with ecofiction and blurs the line between science and the supernatural. In addition to exploring genetics, sex, and the internet, the book also alludes to Incan astronomy. The term 'dark constellations' refers to the darkness between the stars, the shapes formed by negative space.
