= Grey King =

Grey King may refer to:

- A fictional Marvel Comics character, see Cerebro's X-Men.
- The Grey King, a novel
