= The Well-Tempered Clavier (Westworld) =

- Westworld episode
- Episode no.: Season 1 Episode 9
- Directed by: Michelle MacLaren
- Written by: Dan Dietz; Katherine Lingenfelter
- Cinematography by: Jeffrey Jur
- Editing by: Mark Yoshikawa
- Production code: 4X6159
- Original air date: November 27, 2016
- Running time: 59 minutes

Guest appearances
- Eddie Shin as Henry; Gina Torres as Lauren; Louis Herthum as Peter Abernathy; Steven Ogg as Rebus; Talulah Riley as Angela

Episode chronology
← Previous "Trace Decay"	Next → "The Bicameral Mind"

"The Well-Tempered Clavier" is the ninth episode in the first season of the HBO science fiction western thriller television series Westworld. The episode aired on November 27, 2016.

The episode was lauded by critics in particular to Arnold's revelation and Jeffrey Wright and Anthony Hopkins's performances during the final scenes.

This episode marks the final appearance of Sidse Babett Knudsen (Theresa Cullen).

== Plot summary ==
After being pulled in for analysis, Maeve reveals to Bernard his identity as a host and convinces him to let her back into the park. Maeve meets Hector and convinces him to help her escape. The two have sex after Hector agrees to help her, and Maeve tips over a kerosene lamp to start a fire, intending to kill them both.

Teddy has a flashback of himself killing the townspeople of Escalante. Angela remarks that Teddy is not ready to join them yet and stabs and kills him. After being knocked out by Angela, the Man in Black wakes up the next morning to find a noose around his neck, leashed to the saddle of his horse. He frees himself just as the horse gallops away. He encounters Charlotte, who reveals him to be a long-time member of the board of directors.

Logan takes the captured William and Dolores to a Confederado camp. William tries to convince Logan to use his contacts in the park to smuggle Dolores to safety, but Logan insists William has gone crazy. Logan cuts open Dolores' belly to show William she is not real. In response, Dolores cuts Logan in the face and escapes. The next morning, Logan awakes to find that William has slaughtered all of the Confederados. William says that he has figured out "how to play the game" and threatens Logan into helping him find Dolores. Dolores returns to Escalante and goes into the church confessional box, which takes her to an underground lab, where she remembers that she killed Arnold. When she returns to the surface, she encounters the Man in Black.

Bernard confronts Ford and forces him to restore all of his memories despite Ford's warnings that it could damage him. Bernard relives the memory of his son's death and realizes that it is the "cornerstone" upon which his personality is constructed. Believing he can find Arnold if he "goes back to the beginning," Bernard finally lets go of the memory of his son and remembers when he was first activated. Bernard attempts to kill Ford, but Ford uses a back door in Bernard's code to disable him. Ford laments that he built Bernard in Arnold's image and allowed him to become self-aware in the hopes that he would willingly join him. Seeing that his experiment has failed, Ford forces Bernard to commit suicide.

== Production ==
"The Well-Tempered Clavier" was written by Dan Dietz and Katherine Lingenfelter, and was directed by Michelle MacLaren. It is the only episode of the season to not be written by either Jonathan Nolan or Lisa Joy, but rather by individuals who had worked with the two of them in their previous endeavors (Dietz with Nolan on Person of Interest and Lingenfelter with Joy on Pushing Daisies).

According to MacLaren, several of the most memorable scenes in the episode were created with clever practical effects in lieu of digital effects, including some of the transitions between Dolores' past and present, the Man in Black's escape from the noose, and Maeve and Hector's sex scene in a burning tent. The tent scene was filmed on a Santa Clarita studio backlot by placing Thandie Newton and Rodrigo Santoro at a safe distance from the open end of half a tent which had been treated with a special glue in advance to ensure controlled fire spread. The camera was set up with a fire bar in front of it, then long lenses were used to reduce the apparent distance between the flames from the fire bar in front of the actors, and the half-tent going up in flames behind them.

== Reception ==
=== Ratings ===
"The Well-Tempered Clavier" was viewed by 2.09 million American households on its initial viewing. The episode also acquired a 1.0 rating in the 18–49 demographic.

=== Critical reception ===
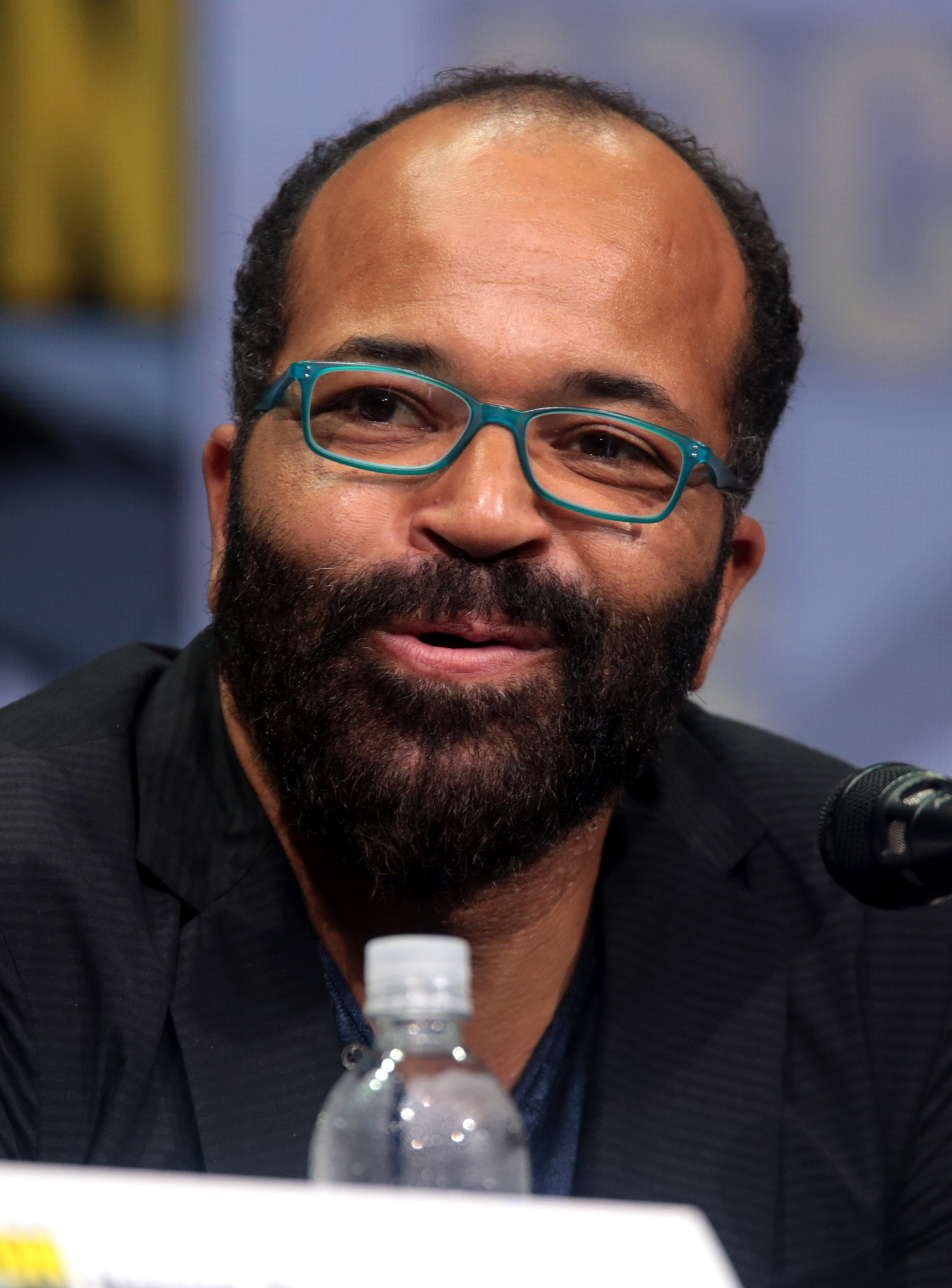
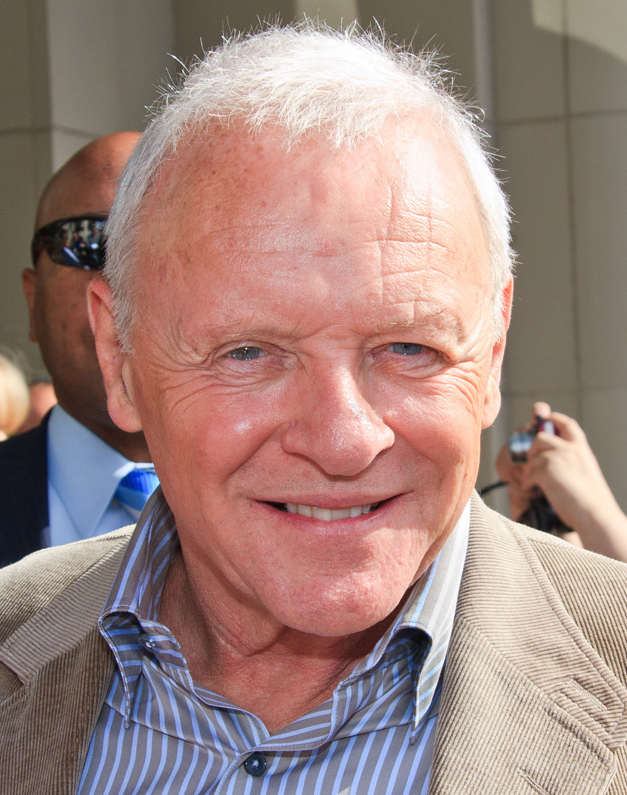
Jeffrey Wright (left) and Anthony Hopkins (right), received praise for their performances.

"The Well-Tempered Clavier" received positive reviews from critics. The episode has an 89% score on Rotten Tomatoes and has an average rating of 8.2 out of 10, based on 19 reviews. The site's consensus reads: "'The Well-Tempered Clavier' confirms a multitude of popular theories in an episode marked by bleak revelations and tragic results."

Terri Schwartz of IGN reviewed the episode positively, saying, "'The Well-Tempered Clavier' did a lot of heavy lifting for Westworld, confirming a huge theory and getting very close to confirming a couple other biggies." She gave it a score of 9.1 out of 10. Scott Tobias of The New York Times wrote in his review of the episode; "The experience of watching "The Well-Tempered Clavier" did underline the unique ambition of Westworld, which is appreciable even when the ins and outs of the show are confusing." Zack Handlen of The A.V. Club wrote in his review, "As the show finally starts showing its cards, it means getting to see the relationships that have been hiding right out in the open, and those relationships are, in their way, just as thrilling as the fireworks they set off." He gave the episode an A−.

Liz Shannon Miller of IndieWire wrote in her review, "Thanks to Game of Thrones, we're somewhat conditioned to expect epic mayhem from the penultimate episodes of an HBO series, but Westworld, as usual, proves committed to developing its own models. 'The Well-Tempered Clavier' didn't stall by any stretch of the imagination, but it's clear that the big action is coming in next week's finale." She gave the episode a B+. James Hibberd of Entertainment Weekly wrote in his review, "There were three big clues that I counted and I probably missed one or two as well." David Crow of Den of Geek said in his review, "The penultimate episode of Westworld season 1 offers confirmation to some game-changing theories." He gave the episode a 4.5 out of 5. Todd Kenreck of Forbes also reviewed the episode, saying, "Jeffrey Wright is just so remarkable in this episode, as is Anthony Hopkins." Emily VanDerWerff of Vox also reviewed the episode positively, saying, "Westworld is a mystery show, like Twin Peaks or Lost, but where both of those earlier shows had most of the mysteries swirling around the characters, Westworld keeps developing mysteries within its characters."

=== Accolades ===
Year	Award	Category	Nominee(s)	Result	Ref.
2017	69th Primetime Emmy Awards	Outstanding Supporting Actor in a Drama Series	Jeffrey Wright	Nominated	
