= Chapter 22 (Legion) =

- Legion episode
- Episode no.: Season 3 Episode 3
- Directed by: John Cameron
- Written by: Nathaniel Halpern
- Cinematography by: Dana Gonzales
- Editing by: Regis Kimble
- Production code: XLN03003
- Original air date: July 8, 2019
- Running time: 46 minutes

Guest appearances
- Harry Lloyd as Charles Xavier; Stephanie Corneliussen as Gabrielle Xavier

Episode chronology
← Previous "Chapter 21"	Next → "Chapter 23"
- Legion season 3

"Chapter 22" is the third episode of the third season of the American surrealist superhero thriller television series Legion, based on the Marvel Comics character of the same name. It was written by co-executive producer Nathaniel Halpern and directed by executive producer John Cameron. It originally aired on FX on July 8, 2019.

The series follows David Haller, a "mutant" diagnosed with schizophrenia at a young age, as he tries to control his psychic powers and combat the sinister forces trying to control him. Eventually, he betrays his former friends at the government agency Division 3, who label him a threat and set off to hunt him down. In the episode, the background of David's biological parents, Gabrielle and Charles Xavier, is explored.

According to Nielsen Media Research, the episode was seen by an estimated 0.370 million household viewers and gained a 0.1 ratings share among adults aged 18–49. The episode received extremely positive reviews from critics, who praised the character development, the introduction to Xavier, performances, cinematography and pacing.

== Plot ==
Thirty years prior to the events of the series, Gabrielle Xavier cares for her son David in a mansion, while her husband Charles constantly leaves for an important trip.

Charles is a mutant, able to read peoples' minds. A World War II veteran, he met Gabrielle at an asylum, a Holocaust survivor who suffered from catatonia. As her condition improved, they fell in love and married, having David as their only child. Charles is working on a prototype Cerebro, which allows him to detect mutants. One of these mutants turns out to be Farouk, and Charles sets off to Morocco to find him. Alone in the mansion, Gabrielle starts experiencing delusions as well as to hearing voices, which turn out to be from the future versions of David and Switch. Despite managing to travel too far in the past, they are unable to properly communicate.

Gabrielle's sanity worsens, feeling that the house is haunted by the voices. To complicate matters, a shadow has been lurking over her and the baby David. She is later called by a panicked Charles, who states that meeting Farouk was a mistake and is coming home. The delusions worsen for Gabrielle, who is tormented by Farouk and David's attempts to hit back at his tricks. In a desperate attempt, David appears as a ghost projection, causing her to faint. Charles arrives, sees David's ghosts and telepathically expels him and Switch back to the present day.

David wants to go back, but Switch is physically and mentally drained from such extreme time travel. She loses consciousness while a desperate David asks her to wake up. Back in the mansion, Charles tries to comfort Gabrielle, realizing that she reverted to her catatonic state, devastating him. Unaware to him, Farouk has entered David's mind, effectively possessing him.

== Production ==
=== Development ===
In June 2019, it was reported that the third episode of the season would be titled "Chapter 22", and was to be directed by executive producer John Cameron and written by co-executive producer Nathaniel Halpern. This was Halpern's twelfth writing credit, and Cameron's second directing credit.

=== Casting ===
Since the series' inception, Noah Hawley intended to explore David's relationship with his father, Charles Xavier / Professor X, indicating that the character may appear in the series. During an appearance at The Late Late Show with James Corden, Dan Stevens invited Patrick Stewart to reprise his role from the X-Men film franchise, with Stewart affirming that he would absolute reprise it.

In February 2019, it was announced that Harry Lloyd would play Xavier, making his debut with the third episode of the season. Hawley felt that the character was essential in forming the origin story of David, explaining "David is an adopted boy who needs to know who he really is, so we're definitely going to tell that story." Lloyd described his version of the character as a more ambiguous figure, explaining, "The way we play that leading scene he kind of abandons his wife. And that was very purposely done so you don't think Charles is the hero. Because we know the fallout out of the battle is terrible, and he ruins the life of a young baby."

== Reception ==
=== Viewers ===
In its original American broadcast, "Chapter 22" was seen by an estimated 0.370 million household viewers and gained a 0.1 ratings share among adults aged 18–49, according to Nielsen Media Research. This means that 0.1 percent of all households with televisions watched the episode. This was a slight decrease in viewership from the previous episode, which was watched by 0.381 million viewers with a 0.1 in the 18-49 demographics.

=== Critical reviews ===
"Chapter 22" received extremely positive reviews from critics. The review aggregator website Rotten Tomatoes reported a 100% approval rating with an average rating of 9.0/10 for the episode, based on 6 reviews.

Alex McLevy of The A.V. Club gave the episode a "B+" grade and wrote, "'Chapter 22' occasionally achieves a kind of tone-poem beauty, a finely textured character study of the sort that made for the high points of seasons one and two."

Nick Harley of Den of Geek wrote, "'Chapter 22' is a fine reintroduction to Charles Xavier, but an even better episode of Legion. It's able to tell a compelling love story while working in some patented psychedelic and disconcerting imagery. Utilizing non-linear storytelling, we're able to watch as Charles makes the mistake of engaging a monster and how that monster takes away all that is truly important to him. I also love the cinematography in the episode and how Legion is always changing up its look based on the tone or setting of the story. As someone who has been annoyed with this show at times in the past, an episode like 'Chapter 22' reminds me why I fell for this series in the first place." Kevin Lever of Tell Tale TV gave the episode a perfect 5 star rating out of 5 and wrote, "The portrayal of time travel, of the longing in David's pleas for his mother's attention throughout the timeline and the mess he may cause himself, is some of the most compelling work the show has done. Coupled with the human and touching story of Charles and Gabrielle falling in love, 'Chapter 22' finds itself as one of the very best of Legion, and one well worth revisiting to uncover its secrets."
