= How to Live Safely in a Science Fictional Universe =

2010 novel by Charles Yu

- First edition
- Author: Charles Yu
- Cover artist: Adam Simpson
- Language: English
- Genre: Novel
- Publisher: Pantheon
- Publication date: 2010
- Publication place: United States
- Media type: Print (hardcover)
- Pages: 256
- ISBN: 0-307-37920-5
- OCLC: 890818043
- Dewey Decimal: 813.6
- LC Class: PS3625.U15 H68

How to Live Safely in a Science Fictional Universe is a 2010 novel by Taiwanese-American writer Charles Yu. The novel revolves around a search for a father and the father-son relationship. It also includes themes about life and how we live especially with respect to time, memories, and creation of the self.

It was runner-up for the John W. Campbell Memorial Award for Best Science Fiction Novel at the University of Kansas.

== Plot ==
The novel centers on Charles Yu, a time machine mechanic. He lives in his TM-31 time machine with his non-existent dog, Ed, and the time machine's depressed computer, TAMMY. Yu travels through Minor Universe 31 fixing time machines of people who try to fix the past. He visits Linus Skywalker who tried to kill his father, Luke Skywalker because his father's fame overshadowed Linus's life. Yu also visits a girl who traveled to be with her grandmother as she died. Yu explains to her that because she wasn't present when it happened, she cannot stay.

Yu is called in by his boss, Phil, to have his time machine serviced. He walks around in the city while his TM-31 is being repaired and visits his mother who is in a time loop in which she continually replays an hour of her life. He watches a holographic version of himself and his mother interact as she serves dinner.

The next day Yu rushes back to his time machine, sees his future self exit his machine, and shoots his future self. As his future self is dying, the future self gives Yu a book and says that the book is the key. By shooting himself, Yu has entered a loop in which he must eventually travel back in time, hand his past self the book, and get shot.

Yu quickly takes off in his time machine and begins to rewrite the book by reading from the book he was handed. He eventually asks himself what would happen if he skipped forward, and so he jumps to the end of the book.

He wakes up in a Buddhist temple and sees "The Woman My Mother Should Have Been" as well as his father's shoes. He exits the temple and finds himself in a shuttle.

Yu finds himself back in his TM-31 and floats through memories that he sees play out before him. He explains how he and his father invented the time machine and brought it to the director of research at the Institute of Conceptual Technology. Yu's father explained the concepts but was unable to get his machine to work.

Back in the TM-31, Yu finds a key in the book he is writing that leads him to discover a diorama with a clock that points to a time. TAMMY and Yu realize that this is a clue to where they can find Yu's father, but also realize that they are headed back to the hangar so Yu's past self can shoot him.

Yu realizes as he flies in that he loves TAMMY and she loves him. He steps out of his time machine and gets shot, but lives as it was just a shot to his stomach.

In the appendix, Yu talks about visiting the place and time displayed by the diorama. He finds his father, trapped because his time machine broke down. Yu makes amends with his father and then travels to the present. He reunites his parents, then sets off to find "The Woman You Never Married". He continues to write his novel, but suggests he "keep stalling, see how long you can keep expanding the infinitely expandable moment".

== Reception ==
How to Live Safely in a Science Fictional Universe was a finalist for the 2011 John W. Campbell Memorial Award for Best Science Fiction Novel, and was ranked second.

In The New York Times, Ander Monson noted "The novel’s central, lonely story is wrapped in glittering layers of gorgeous and playful meta-science-fiction ... These unexpected formal moves keep the story from dipping into the sentimental, as they usually lead to actual human emotion and thinking about what constitutes the human sense of self." Kirkus Reviews described it as "A fascinating, philosophical and disorienting thriller about life and the context that gives it meaning."

In 2011, the book was adapted into a play by Jennifer Fawcett and Matt Slaybaugh and performed at Available Light Theatre in Columbus, Ohio.
