= Trace Decay =

- Westworld episode
- Episode no.: Season 1 Episode 8
- Directed by: Stephen Williams
- Written by: Charles Yu; Lisa Joy
- Cinematography by: Robert McLachlan; Jeffrey Jur
- Editing by: Tanya Swerling
- Production code: 4X6158
- Original air date: November 20, 2016
- Running time: 58 minutes

Guest appearances
- Ptolemy Slocum as Sylvester; Leonardo Nam as Felix Lutz; Talulah Riley as Angela; Lili Simmons as New Clementine Pennyfeather; Brian Howe as Sheriff Pickett; Demetrius Grosse as Deputy Foss; Louis Herthum as Peter Abernathy; Eddie Shin as Henry

Episode chronology
← Previous "Trompe L'Oeil"	Next → "The Well-Tempered Clavier"

"Trace Decay" is the eighth episode in the first season of the HBO science fiction western thriller television series Westworld. The episode aired on November 20, 2016.

The episode received very positive reviews from critics.

== Plot summary ==
Bernard is distraught over having been ordered to kill Theresa. Ford promises that he will erase Bernard's memories. Theresa's death is classified as an accident, and her industrial espionage is exposed, as is her manipulation of Clementine. In light of the revelations, Charlotte is forced to reinstate Bernard as Head of Behavior. Bernard asks Ford if he had ever ordered him to hurt anybody other than Theresa. Ford replies he had not, but just before Ford erases his memory, Bernard has a vision of himself attacking Elsie.

Charlotte uploads all of Westworld's data into Peter Abernathy, Dolores' previous father. She orders Lee to program Peter to smuggle himself out of the park with the data.

Maeve orders Felix and Sylvester to grant her administrative privileges and to have the fail-safe explosive in her spine removed. Maeve then returns to the park and tests her ability to control the other hosts. As she prepares to leave the park, she has another vision of herself and her daughter being attacked by the Man in Black. In her terror, Maeve kills the new Clementine, which alerts the park staff. She flees back to her room, where she has another flashback of Ford and Bernard erasing her memory of her daughter. Maeve feigns a shutdown as the park staff arrives to retrieve her.

The Man in Black and Teddy find a group of slaughtered settlers and one survivor, Angela, whom the Man In Black recognizes as the Host who first welcomed him to Westworld. The two are attacked by one of Wyatt's cultists, who appears to be immune to bullets. As they battle, Teddy has a flashback of the Man in Black attacking Dolores. Teddy interrogates the Man in Black about Dolores' location. Instead, the Man in Black tells Teddy why he came to the park: after his wife committed suicide, he felt he had no more purpose in life and came to Westworld to find his true self. After he had killed Maeve and her daughter, he discovered the maze and has been obsessed with finding it ever since. Angela attempts to persuade Teddy to kill the Man in Black, but he cannot. Angela stabs Teddy in the shoulder, revealing herself to be one of Wyatt's followers as more of his cultists appear from the surrounding woods.

== Production ==
"Trace Decay" was written by novelist Charles Yu and series co-creator Lisa Joy, and was directed by Stephen Williams.

=== Music ===
In an interview, composer Ramin Djawadi spoke about the song "Reverie" by Debussy, that was used by Ford to calm a Host, when she was not responding to verbal commands. He said, "The music is being controlled, and it's being chosen for a reason". Djawadi continued, saying, "The great power of music is that something subconsciously happens when you listen to a piece of music, even if you don't pay full attention to it. It just does something to us that nothing else can do, other than music."

Amy Winehouse's "Back to Black" and The Animals's "House of the Rising Sun" are also featured in the episode.

== Reception ==
=== Ratings ===
"Trace Decay" was viewed by 1.78 million American households on its initial viewing. The episode also acquired a 0.8 rating in the 18–49 demographic. In the United Kingdom, the episode was seen by 1.03 million viewers on Sky Atlantic.

=== Critical reception ===
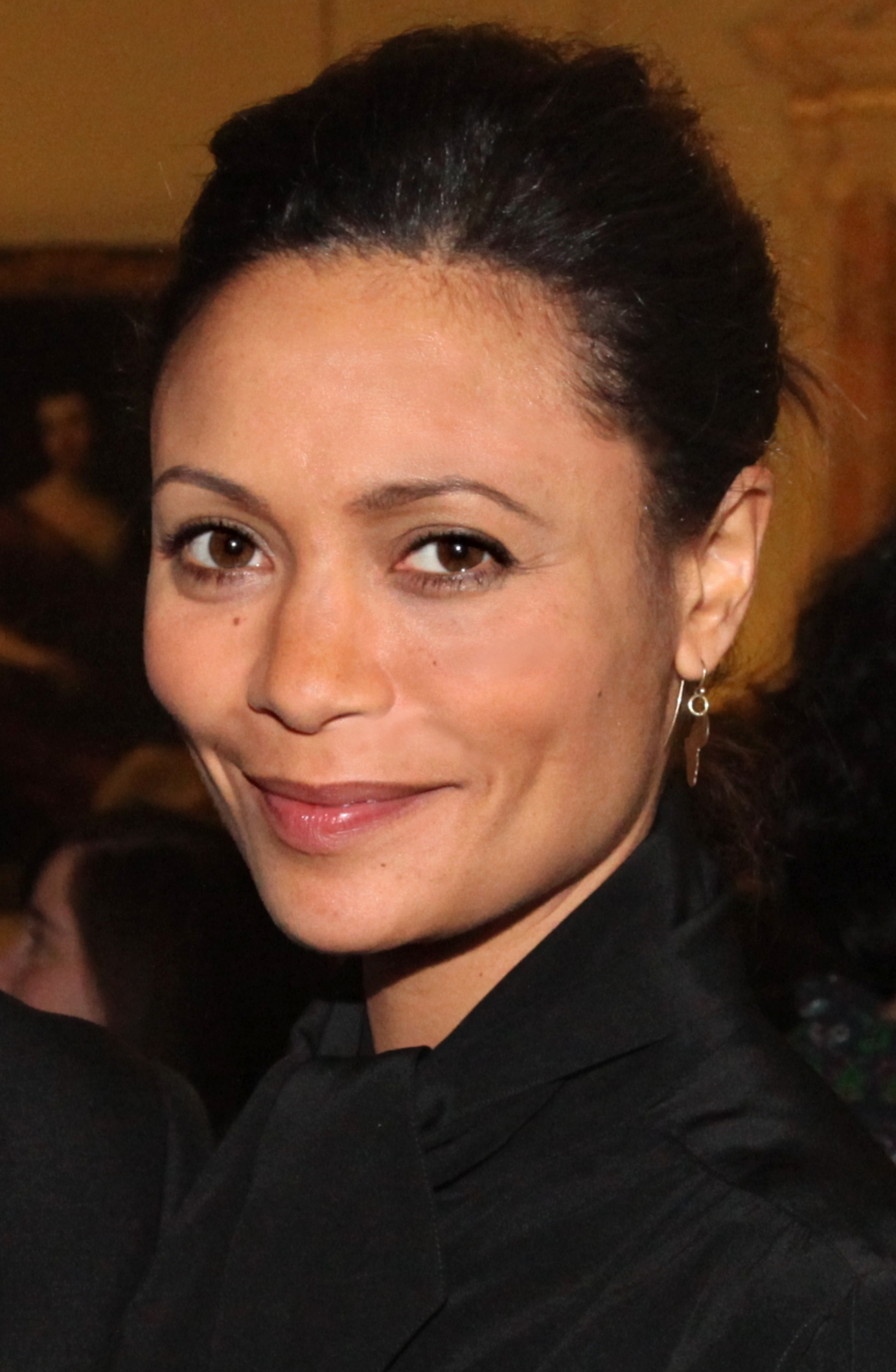
Thandiwe Newton received widespread acclaim for her performance and was nominated for Outstanding Supporting Actress in a Drama Series.

"Trace Decay" received highly positive reviews from critics. The episode has a 94% score on Rotten Tomatoes and has an average rating of 8.2 out of 10, based on 18 reviews. The site's consensus reads: "Providing its major characters rich layers of context, Westworld's 'Trace Decay' begins pulling together the elements of the park's origins and setting the stage for what is sure to be a thrilling conclusion."

Terri Schwartz of IGN reviewed the episode positively, saying, "While Westworld didn't offer any true resolutions to some of its biggest questions, it teased them out in an interesting way and offered a lot more context to major characters like Maeve and the Man in Black." She gave it a score of 8.7 out of 10. Scott Tobias of The New York Times wrote in his review of the episode; "Thandie Newton has become Yul Brynner in the original Westworld, a robot hellbent on destruction, only infinitely smarter and more devious. Her liberation is the show's, too." Zack Handlen of The A.V. Club wrote in his review, "With two episodes left in the first season, the action is pulling together and the stakes are rising, and yet elements crucial to our understanding remain withheld." He gave the episode a B.

Liz Shannon Miller of IndieWire wrote in her review, "We can't expect major twists every week, but while 'Trace Decay' didn't feel like it was stalling, it perhaps could have pushed things further. It's a minor complaint, though—a bump in the ride we're still enjoying." She gave the episode a B+. James Hibberd of Entertainment Weekly wrote in his review, "There are only two more episodes left, almost everybody has been captured, or in the process of being captured, and poor Bernard doesn't remember anything! How will it end?" Ed Power of The Daily Telegraph wrote in his review, "For once it was worth paying attention as Westworld dropped further breadcrumbs regarding the park's origins and Bernard's role in its creation." David Crow of Den of Geek said in his review, "The hour felt like a comedown, a slowing and re-calibration before the final two episodes presumably blow us all away as if we're a poor, dull-eyed sheriff walking away from Armistice while she has a rifle trained on our backside." He gave the episode a 3.5 out of 5. Erik Kain of Forbes also reviewed the episode, saying, "Where does it all go from here? I don't know, honestly. What I do know is that I can't wait to find out. Without doubt, Westworld is the best thing on TV right now."

=== Accolades ===
Year	Award	Category	Nominee(s)	Result	Ref.
2017	Golden Reel Awards	Best Sound Editing in Television, Short Form: Dialogue / ADR	Thomas E. de Gorter, Matthew Sawelson, Brian Armstrong and Fred Paragano	Nominated	
2017	69th Primetime Emmy Awards	Outstanding Supporting Actress in a Drama Series	Thandie Newton	Nominated	
