= Interior Chinatown (TV series) =

American television series

- Genre: Action comedy; Drama
- Created by: Charles Yu
- Based on: Interior Chinatown by Charles Yu
- Showrunner: Charles Yu
- Starring: Jimmy O. Yang; Ronny Chieng; Chloe Bennet; Sullivan Jones; Lisa Gilroy; Archie Kao; Diana Lin
- Music by: Mark Mothersbaugh; Nick Lee
- Country of origin: United States
- Original language: English
- No. of seasons: 1
- No. of episodes: 10

Production
- Executive producers: Charles Yu; Taika Waititi; Dan Lin; Lindsey Liberatore; Jeff Skoll; Miura Kite; Elsie Choi; John Lee; Garrett Basch
- Producers: Joanne Toll; Alex Russell; Matt Okumura
- Cinematography: Mike Berlucchi; Tari Segal
- Editors: Andrew Groves; Joanne Yarrow; Nicole Brik; Patrick Tuck; Tamar Federknopp; David Chang
- Running time: 34–47 minutes
- Production companies: MSD Imaginary Machines; Waititi; Participant; Rideback; 20th Television

Original release
- Network: Hulu
- Release: November 19, 2024

Interior Chinatown (stylized onscreen as INT. CHINATOWN) is an American action comedy-drama television series created by showrunner Charles Yu, based on his 2020 novel of the same name. His novel won the National Book Award the year it was published. The series stars Jimmy O. Yang as a waiter in Chinatown who discovers that he is merely a background character in a fictional police procedural. Produced by 20th Television, the series premiered on Hulu on November 19, 2024.

== Premise ==
Unbeknownst to him, Willis Wu is a background character in the fictional police procedural Black and White. When he chooses to investigate the disappearance of his brother twelve years earlier, he starts to uncover family secrets and the machinations behind his fictionalized version of Chinatown.

== Cast ==
=== Main ===
- Jimmy O. Yang as Willis Wu, a waiter at the Golden Palace, a Chinese restaurant. He feels trapped and wants to see the larger world.
- Ronny Chieng as Fatty Choi, Willis's best friend and co-worker at the Golden Palace
- Chloe Bennet as Lana Lee, a detective who recruits Willis to investigate the disappearance of his brother
- Sullivan Jones as Miles Turner, a detective who leads the investigation of several crime scenes in Port Harbor
- Lisa Gilroy as Sarah Green, a detective who leads the investigation of several crime scenes in Port Harbor
- Archie Kao as Uncle Wong, the owner of Golden Palace
- Diana Lin as Lily Wu, Willis's mother

=== Recurring ===
- Tzi Ma (Note: Tzi Ma is credited as "Special Guest Star" but is a recurring cast member) as Joe Wu, Willis' father
- Annie Chang as Audrey Chan, Willis's childhood friend and an aspiring lawyer
- Chau Long as Carl, an employee at Golden Palace
- Allan McLeod as Desk Sergeant Felix, a desk sergeant at the Port Harbor police
- Marlon Young as Janitor, a janitor working at the Port Harbor police
- Lauren Tom as Betty Chan, Audrey's mother and a real estate agent, who is an aspirational figure for Lily
- Michael J. Harney as Chief Walden, the police chief of Port Harbor PD
- Chris Pang as Jonathan Wu, Willis's late brother who died 12 years prior. His death was deemed mysterious.
- Maury Sterling as Brendan Carrey, an older detective who had worked with Jonathan prior to his death
- Spencer Neville as Aidan McDonough, a young detective who also worked with Jonathan 12 years ago

== Episodes ==
No.	Title	Directed by	Written by	Original release date	Prod. code
1	"Generic Asian Man"	Taika Waititi	Charles Yu	November 19, 2024	1KBR01
Willis Wu is a waiter at the Golden Palace who sees himself as a background character in a television show called Black & White. He resents his father, who had trained his missing older brother Jonathan in kung fu but purposely trained Willis to fail to protect him from people challenging him to contests. After witnessing the kidnapping of a young woman who he later learns was murdered, he becomes convinced that he is destined for something greater. He falls for Lana Lee, the detective assigned to the case who visits the restaurant, and tells her about the kidnapping. Lana recruits him to help take down the gangs in Chinatown and, after some digging, reveals that his brother was working with her unit before he disappeared. Motivated to find out what happened to Jonathan, Willis agrees to help Lana. Shortly afterward, Willis sees the purportedly murdered kidnapping victim alive.
2	"Delivery Guy"	Ben Sinclair	Eva Anderson	November 19, 2024	1KBR02
Willis begins to duck out of work, forcing his friend and co-worker Fatty Choi to take over his duties. Lana takes Willis to the precinct, but he is somehow unable to enter the building. When Lana tries to introduce Willis to her superiors, Turner and Green, they seem incapable of noticing him. This allows Willis to overhear a very personal conversation about their opinion of Lana. Even after he helps to solve a murder, a supernatural force prevents Willis from entering the precinct. A neighbor of Willis's passes away and Chinatown grieves the loss. Willis's mother Lily learns that he broke up an animal smuggling ring and now there is a vacancy in the former hideout building. Lily, having gained a realtor's license, decides to buy the space. Inspired by a comment from Fatty, Willis feigns a food delivery and finally enters the precinct.
3	"Tech Guy"	Jaffar Mahmood	Matt Okumura	November 19, 2024	1KBR03
Lana gives Willis a tape from his brother on which he says that he thinks he is being watched by someone. Needing more information, Willis begins feigning more deliveries and ends up befriending members of the precinct. Audrey Chan, a girl who has a crush on Willis, helps him by determining the amount of food he needs to bring. Fatty begins to grow frustrated with dealing with customers, which backfires due to people then wanting to come see him. Lana tries to get closer to the ever suspicious Green, who later approves of a bust. Willis learns that the files of past cases are now on digital. Realizing that no one notices the "tech guy" in charge, the precinct help Willis replace the tech guy. Assuming the guy's role enables Willis to master use of the computers. He opens up the files of his brother and finds hundreds of files about him.
4	"Kung Fu Guy"	John Lee	Tiffany So & Saba Saghafi	November 19, 2024	1KBR04
Willis and Lana sit down and watch the files, presented as film clips, and learn that his brother was the "kung fu guy" for former cops McDonough and Carrey. Lily gets hired by realtor Betty Chan, who comments how her husband Joe is always reflecting on his past. Fatty learns that he has become a viral sensation for his rude service, which his boss Uncle Wong fully supports, much to his chagrin. While Lana is away, Willis begins to dig further into the files and learns that his brother was the leader of the Painted Faces, a criminal gang. When Willis sees footage of his brother killing McDonough, he deletes all the footage. He tells Fatty to tell Uncle Wong that he quits, leaving him dejected. Suddenly, Willis realizes where his brother made his call and follows a hidden tunnel that leads into the office of the Golden Palace.
5	"Chinatown Expert"	Alice Wu	Naiem Bouier	November 19, 2024	1KBR05
Willis and Lana suspect Uncle Wong, the owner of the Golden Palace, of being involved with Willis’s brother’s disappearance, and resolve to steal the keys to his office to investigate. To get him to drop his guard, Lana poses as Willis’s girlfriend during a family dinner. Willis gets into the office, and finds his brother’s pager, given to him by Carrey and McDonough, hidden behind a painting. Willis flees, discovering that all the stores are connected, but is caught by Uncle Wong who takes him somewhere. Meanwhile, Turner begins to become self-aware of their world and tires of the monotony of constantly solving cases the same way, though Green tries to dissuade him. When disarming a time bomb in the precinct, Turner’s disaffection leads him to let it explode, yet the bomb’s countdown stops as if he had successfully disarmed it.
6	"Translator"	Stephanie Laing	Keiko Green	November 19, 2024	1KBR06
Uncle Wong reveals that he helps people who have been trafficked in crates, though he doesn't know where they came from. Lana solves a case quickly so that Turner and Green can come and rescue Willis, impressing Turner. Soon, the detectives begin to notice that some of their cold cases are still unsolved, reigniting Turner's passion. Wong refuses to talk and Willis tries to get his money to bail him out, but a dejected Fatty prevents him from doing so. Willis encounters the original tech guy Kamran, who is happy in his new life at a tech store and helps him with the pager. Willis poses as a translator to get Wong to open up about his brother. Audrey comes and has him bailed out, while Willis breaks down in front of Turner and Green, who finally acknowledge him and agree to help him. Lana confesses to Willis that she was working with his brother.
7	"Detective"	Pete Chatmon	Lauren Otero	November 19, 2024	1KBR07
Willis gets paired with Turner while Lana gets paired with Green. Willis and Turner manage to locate a series of leads that have them running into Carrey, who reiterates that Jonathan was the leader of the Painted Faces. Green realizes that Lana was dating Jonathan, and the two head to the docks where they used to go all the time. After capturing a perp, they find that the boat had been destroyed and sunk, with Jonathan presumed dead. Willis and Turner finally open up to one another about their respective lives with Turner revealing that he didn't want to become a cop and did so to feel closer to his dad. He announces he is quitting the force and has Willis inducted as a detective. Believing that this is where he belongs, Willis embraces his new life.
8	"Ad Guy"	John Lee	Alex Russell	November 19, 2024	1KBR08
Presented as a series of commercial breaks, three months have passed, with Willis becoming a famous detective. He stars in a string of commercials where he has an assistant named Josh who seems to interrupt him whenever he is about to have a meaningful moment. Lana is put on leave so that her background can be checked as she continues her search for Jonathan. She joins Carl in going to the docks. Lily has become a successful realtor, but Betty promotes a gentrified presentation as opposed to something cultural, damaging her relationship with her daughter Audrey. Willis films a commercial for Fatty's hot sauce, as Fatty has become rich himself, and the two get into a fight about their respective lives. Realizing that this was the life Turner warned him about and admitting that he misses Jon, Willis finally patches things up with Lily.
9	"Bad Guy"	Anu Valia	Eva Anderson & Greg Cabrera	November 19, 2024	1KBR09
Willis and Green become partners and discover that McDonough is still alive. Lana now works at the Golden Palace to stay close to Wong. After an elder of the community supposedly dies, she awakens at the docks with no memory. Lana realizes that citizens are getting "recycled". Willis goes missing, with the precinct now convinced that he is behind the Painted Faces. The chief orders Green to capture him or she is fired. Green slowly admits that she misses Turner, who is now a mangaka, and gets in touch with him, trying to ask him back on the force. Willis confronts McDonough, who confirms that Jonathan was framed. Willis goes into the tunnels and realizes that his world is a TV show controlled by a large company. He then runs into the Painted Faces who proceed to tell him what is really happening in Chinatown.
10	"Willis. Willis Wu."	Stephanie Laing	Charles Yu	November 19, 2024	1KBR10
The Painted Faces were friends of Jonathan and reveal that their lives are being watched. Willis flees when police arrive and calls upon Turner and Lana. Lana confirms that the company called Hulu is behind the strange events. An event honoring Lily's work is being held at the Golden Palace and the gang race there with Green also arriving. Lily quits Betty's team after suffering a moral dilemma; Turner and Green make amends and resume their partnership, while Willis also makes amends with Fatty, who has meanwhile started a relationship with Audrey. As the police close in, Willis and Lana race to the roof with cameras on them. Willis decides to tell his story, accepting that he is just a regular guy. Lana, who realizes that Jonathan was communicating within an arcade game, pushes herself and Willis off the roof where they both fall into a dumpster. Willis ends up in a purgatory where he happily reunites with Jonathan. All the events are revealed to be a script that Willis is writing. He is introduced to his new assistant, Lana, as this reality is revealed to be a show as well.

== Production ==
=== Development ===
Development of a television adaptation of Interior Chinatown began in 2020. Hulu ordered ten episodes of the series in October 2022, when Jimmy O. Yang was announced as the lead and Taika Waititi would direct the pilot episode. The series is created by Charles Yu who also serves as the showrunner.

=== Casting ===
In October 2022, Ronny Chieng and Chloe Bennet joined the cast of the series. In January 2023, Sullivan Jones, Lisa Gilroy, Diana Lin, Archie Kao and Tzi Ma joined the cast, with Ma joining in recurring capacity. In February 2023, Lauren Tom joined the cast in recurring capacity. In April 2023, Chris Pang joined the cast in a recurring capacity.

=== Filming ===
Principal photography began by February 2023, with location shooting at the Universal Pictures backlot, Chinatown, Los Angeles, New Zealand (Chinese New Zealanders), and Toronto (Chinatowns in Toronto), and wrapped prior to August 2023.

Golden Palace Restaurant setting is inspired by the real-life Doyers Street and the real-life Doyers Street tunnels in Manhattan’s Chinatown.

=== Music ===
The series features several Cantopop songs, including Lazy Mutha Fucka's "Hum Ga Ling", Sam Hui's "Lullaby", Ricky Hui's "Take Me Home, Country Roads", and Frances Yip's "The Bund".

== Release ==
Interior Chinatown premiered on Hulu on November 19, 2024. Internationally, the series was released on Disney+.

== Reception ==
=== Viewership ===
Interior Chinatown ranked No. 13 on Hulu's "Top 15 Today" list—a daily updated list of the platform's most-watched titles—on November 19. The series subsequently placed No. 2 on November 20, followed by No. 4 on November 21, No. 15 on November 22, No. 11 on November 24, and No. 13 on November 25.

=== Critical response ===
The review aggregator website Rotten Tomatoes reported an 87% approval rating with an average rating of 6.6/10, based on 31 critic reviews. The website's critics consensus reads, "Adapting its satirical source material to imperfect but thrilling effect, Interior Chinatown is freewheeling entertainment with plenty to say about Asian-American stereotypes in media." Metacritic, which uses a weighted average, assigned a score of 64 out of 100 based on 12 critics, indicating "generally favorable" reviews.

=== Accolades ===
Interior Chinatown was nominated for Outstanding Achievement in Cinematography in Limited or Anthology Series, or Motion Picture Made for Television at the 2024 American Society of Cinematographers Awards. Jimmy O. Yang won the Breakthrough Actor Award at the 2024 Critics Choice Awards Celebration of Cinema & Television.
