= Interior Chinatown =

2020 novel by Charles Yu

- First edition cover
- Author: Charles Yu
- Audio read by: Joel de la Fuente
- Cover artist: Tyler Comrie
- Language: English
- Publisher: Pantheon Books
- Publication date: January 28, 2020
- Publication place: United States
- Media type: Print (hardcover), e-book, audiobook
- Pages: 288
- Awards: National Book Award for Fiction (2020)
- ISBN: 978-0-307-90719-6 (hardcover)
- OCLC: 1142787425
- Dewey Decimal: 813/.6
- LC Class: PS3625.U15 I58 2020

Interior Chinatown is a 2020 novel by Charles Yu. It is his second novel and was published by Pantheon Books on January 28, 2020. It won the 2020 National Book Award for Fiction. The novel was also longlisted for the 2021 Andrew Carnegie Medal for Excellence in Fiction and was shortlisted for the Prix Médicis étranger. A television adaptation of the novel, created by Yu and starring Jimmy O. Yang, premiered on Hulu on November 19, 2024.

== Summary ==
The novel uses the narrative structure of the screenplay format to tell the tale of Willis Wu, the "Generic Asian Man" who is stuck playing "Background Oriental Male" and occasionally "Delivery Guy" in the fictional police procedural Black and White. He longs to be "Kung Fu Guy" on screens worldwide.

== Background ==
Interior Chinatown was published in hardcover, e-book and audiobook format by Pantheon Books on January 28, 2020. The audiobook was narrated by actor Joel de la Fuente.

On January 27, 2020, Yu appeared on The Daily Show with Trevor Noah to discuss the book, as well as the lack of on-screen representation for Asian Americans and the model minority stereotype of Asian Americans. Yu also discussed the novel in an interview with Scott Simon on NPR's Weekend Edition Saturday on January 25, 2020, and in an appearance on Los Angeles Review of Books (LARB) Radio Hour with Medaya Ocher and Kate Wolf on February 3, 2020.

In an interview with Timothy Tau for Hyphen, Yu remarked that his influences for the novel included Paul Beatty's Man Booker Prize-winning novel The Sellout as well as the "cyclical structure" of the film Groundhog Day.

== Reception ==
Kirkus Reviews called the novel an "acid indictment of Asian stereotypes and a parable for outcasts feeling invisible in this fast-moving world". Carolyn Kellogg of The Washington Post praised Yu's screenplay format as "the perfect delivery system for the satire of Interior Chinatown". Anita Felicelli of the San Francisco Chronicle called the novel's format "groundbreaking" and wrote that Yu "solders together mordant wit and melancholic whimsy to produce a moving exploration of race and assimilation". Pete Hsu of the Los Angeles Review of Books praised the accessibility of the novel's allegory and its commentary on the human condition, as well as the "meticulously crafted" details of the novel which "render a universe that feels complete to the touch". Josh Denslow of the Washington Independent Review of Books wrote that the story is "told with humor and affection and a deep understanding of human nature".

Jaclyn Fulwood of Shelf Awareness wrote, "Yu's format-bending, deeply felt examination of the American dream is an exercise in encouraged empathy." Ken Smith of the Asian Review of Books wrote, "Though much of his protagonist's insecurities are narrowly focused—not just Asian, but specifically Asian American—his accumulation of concerns becomes surprisingly and relatably inclusive."

The novel was also reviewed in The New York Times, Booklist, the New York Journal of Books, The Washington Times, The Harvard Crimson, the Chicago Review of Books, and Bookreporter.com.

== Television adaptation ==
In October 2020, Hulu announced that they would be adapting the novel into a TV series. In 2022, details emerged that Taika Waititi would be an executive producer, Jimmy O. Yang would starring as Willis Wu, and that Charles Yu would be the showrunner. The ten-episode series premiered on Hulu on November 19, 2024.

== Awards and nominations ==
Year	Award	Result	Ref.
2021	Andrew Carnegie Medal for Excellence in Fiction	Longlisted	
2020	National Book Award for Fiction	Won	
2020	Prix Médicis étranger	Shortlisted	
