= Eddie Shin =

American actor

- Education: Williams College; University of Chicago (BA)
- Occupation: Actor
- Years active: 2001–present

Eddie Shin is an American actor. He played Dave Mendoza in the Netflix series Alexa & Katie, and portrays characters named Agent Mike Li in the 2015 first season of the Marvel Cinematic Universe (MCU) television series Agent Carter and the 2018 film Peppermint.

== Biography ==
Shin graduated from the University of Chicago. He played Stanley Mao in ER. and Henry Cho in Gilmore Girls. His guest television appearances include NYPD Blue, Malcolm in the Middle, NCIS, Two and a Half Men, 2 Broke Girls, Castle, The Middle and The Big Bang Theory. He voiced Taka in Ghost of Tsushima.

== Filmography ==
=== Film ===
Year	Title	Role	Notes
2005	American Fusion	Bernard	
2012	The Guilt Trip	Chris Chung	Uncredited
2014	Dumb and Dumber To	Gordy	
2015	Twelve	Ian	
2015	Richard Peter Johnson	Eddie Kim	
2018	Peppermint	FBI Agent Peter Li	

=== Television ===
Year	Title	Role	Notes
2001	ER	Stanley Mao	Episodes: "Start All Over Again" and "Supplies and Demands"
2001–02	Gilmore Girls	Henry Cho	Recurring role, 5 episodes
2002	That '80s Show	Roger Park	Main role
2002	Girls Club	Mitchell Walton	Episodes: "Pilot", "Book Of Virtues" and "Secrets and Lies"
2003	NYPD Blue	Jin-Yong Kim	Episode: "22 Skidoo"
2004	Malcolm in the Middle	Jordan	Episode: "Malcolm Dates a Family"
2004	Listen Up	Michael	Episode: "Quest for Fire"
2005	Point Pleasant	Boyd's Assistant	Episode: "Human Nature"
2005–06	Love, Inc.	Gene	Episodes: "Pilot" and "Hello, Larry"
2006	Help Me Help You	Paul	Episode: "Raging Bill"
2006	Misconceptions	Trey	3 episodes
2007	Pushing Daisies	Wilfred Woodruff	Episode: "The Fun in Funeral"
2007	Cavemen	Craig Nadler	Episode: "The Shaver"
2008	Terminator: The Sarah Connor Chronicles	Xander Akagi	Episode: "Strange Things Happen at the One Two Point"
2010	Castle	Johnny Vong	Episode: "Sucker Punch"
2010	NCIS	Agent Kyle Omagi	Episode: "Jurisdiction"
2010	Ghost Whisperer	Damon Weaver	Episode: "On Thin Ice"
2010–11	Men of a Certain Age	Carl	Recurring role, 9 episodes
2011	Royal Pains	Tony Lee	Episode: "Pit Stop"
2011	CHAOS	Lee Quan Song	Episode: "Song of the North"
2011	How to Make It in America	Park G	Episode: "It's Not Even Like That"
2011	Prime Suspect	Richard Zhou	Episode: "The Great Wall of Silence"
2012	Two and a Half Men	Dr. Kim	Episode: "Why We Gave up Women"
2013	Anger Management	Director	Episode: "Charlie Gets Lindsay Lohan in Trouble"
2013	2 Broke Girls	Tom	Episode: "And the Extra Work"
2014	Mystery Girls	Henry	Episode: "Haunted House Party"
2014	Enlisted	Ted	Episode: "Alive Day"
2014	Manhattan	Sid Liao	4 episodes
2014	NCIS: Los Angeles	Matthew Ogilvie	3 episodes
2015	Agent Carter	SSR Agent Mike Li	Episode: "The Iron Ceiling"
2015	Bones	Jim Chou	Episode: "The Cowboy in the Contest"
2016	Lucifer	Benny Choi	Episode: "Sweet Kicks"
2016	The Detour	Conquistador Brian	Episode: "The Restaurant"
2016	Westworld	Henry	Episodes: "The Stray", "Trace Decay" and "The Well-Tempered Clavier"
2016	The Man in the High Castle	Noriyuke Tagomi	4 episodes (Season 2)
2017	Training Day	Takashi Koh	Episode: "Code of Honor"
2017, 2019	American Housewife	Richard	Episodes: "The Man Date", "Liar Liar, Room on Fire" and "Girls' Night Out"
2017	Criminal Minds: Beyond Borders	Geonwoo Lee	Episode: "Pretty Like Me"
2018	The Middle	Mike the Trivia Host	Episode: "The Royal Flush"
2018	The Big Bang Theory	Dr. Park	Episode: "The Planetarium Collision"
2018–2020	Alexa & Katie	Dave Mendoza	Main role
2019	S.W.A.T.	Officer Wong	Episode: "Fallen"
2019	Grace and Frankie	Toby	Episode: "The Aide"
2019	Robot Chicken	Dick Jones, Steve Martin	Voice role; episode: "Molly Lucero in: Your Friend's Boob"
2020	AJ and the Queen	Doctor	Episode: "Baton Rouge"
2022	Roar	Jim	Episode: "The Girl Who Loved Horses"
2023	Beef	Pastor Kim	3 episodes
2024	The Really Loud House	Mr. Kim	Episode: "McCloud vs. Machine"
2025	It's Always Sunny in Philadelphia	Moderator Mike	Episode: "The Gang Gets Ready for Prime Time"

=== Video games ===
Year	Title	Role	Notes
2020	Ghost of Tsushima	Taka	VA counterpart (as Japanese): Kappei Yamaguchi & motion capture
2024	Rise of the Rōnin	Shusaku Chiba	Voice; English version
