= Charles Yu =

American writer (born 1976)

Charles Yu 游朝凱
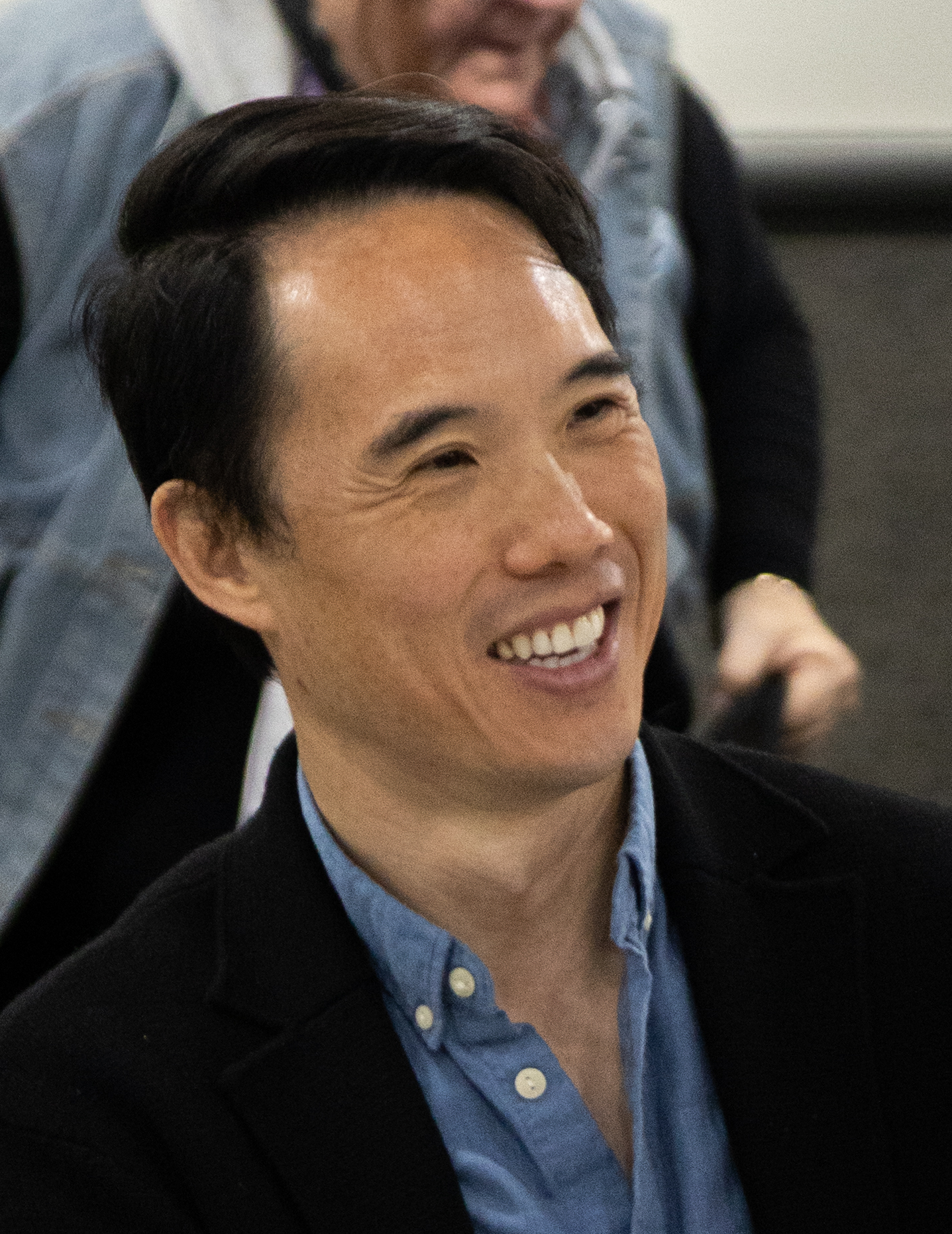
- Yu at AWP 2025
- Born: Charles Chowkai Yu; January 3, 1976 (age 50); Los Angeles, California, U.S.
- Education: University of California, Berkeley (BS); Columbia University (JD)
- Occupations: Author; novelist; short story writer; television writer; attorney
- Writing career
- Genres: novel, literary fiction, science fiction, experimental fiction, non-fiction
- Notable works: How to Live Safely in a Science Fictional Universe (2010); Interior Chinatown (2020)
- Notable awards: National Book Award for Fiction (2020) (for Interior Chinatown); Robert Olen Butler Prize; Sherwood Anderson Fiction Award

Chinese name
- Traditional Chinese: 游朝凱
- Simplified Chinese: 游朝凯
Transcriptions
Standard Mandarin
- Hanyu Pinyin: Yóu Cháokǎi
- Wade–Giles: Yu Chowkai
- Website: www.charlesyuauthor.com

Charles Chowkai Yu (Chinese: 游朝凱; born January 3, 1976) is an American writer and lawyer. He is the author of the novels How to Live Safely in a Science Fictional Universe and Interior Chinatown, as well as the short-story collections Third Class Superhero and Sorry Please Thank You. In 2007 he was named a "5 under 35" honoree by the National Book Foundation. In 2020, Interior Chinatown won the National Book Award for fiction. Yu created a television adaptation of Interior Chinatown which premiered in 2024.

== Personal life ==
Yu was raised in a Taiwanese American family. His parents had emigrated to the United States from Taiwan. He mentioned that besides drawing from his own life in writing Interior Chinatown, he also knew that he wanted to write about this certain experience of his parents as immigrants, during which time his kids were also growing up.

Yu graduated from the University of California, Berkeley, with a Bachelor of Arts in molecular biology and cellular biology in 1997. As an undergraduate, he minored in creative writing, and "wrote poetry, not fiction". He also "took several poetry workshops with people like Thom Gunn and Ishmael Reed".

He obtained his Juris Doctor from Columbia Law School. He has worked as an associate at Sullivan & Cromwell, as a corporate attorney in Bryan Cave, became the Director of Business Affairs at Digital Domain and worked as an associate general counsel at Belkin International, before finally becoming a full-time fiction and TV writer.

He lives near Irvine, California with his wife, Michelle Jue and their two children, Sophia and Dylan. His brother is the actor and TV writer Kelvin Yu.

== Writing ==
In 2007, Yu was selected by the National Book Foundation as one of its "5 Under 35", a program which highlights the work of the next generation of fiction writers by asking five previous National Book Award fiction Winners and Finalists to select one fiction writer under the age of 35 whose work they find particularly promising and exciting. Yu was selected for the honor by Richard Powers.

In 2021, Yu established the Betty L. Yu and Jin C. Yu Creative Writing Prizes in collaboration with TaiwaneseAmerican.org.

=== Short stories ===
His fiction was cited for special mention in the Pushcart Prize Anthology XXVIII, specifically "Problems for Self-Study" published in the Harvard Review.

Yu also received the 2004 Sherwood Anderson Fiction Award from the Mid-American Review for his story, "Third Class Superhero".

As for editing anthologies, Yu served as the Guest Editor for The Best American Science Fiction and Fantasy 2017 from The Best American Series and the publisher Houghton Mifflin Harcourt.

=== Novels ===
==== How to Live Safely in a Science Fictional Universe ====
His first novel, How to Live Safely in a Science Fictional Universe, was published and released in 2010 and was ranked that year's second-best science fiction novel by the Center for the Study of Science Fiction at the University of Kansas — and a runner up for the Campbell Memorial Award. The book was also optioned by film director and writer Chris Columbus' production company, 1492 Pictures. The novel was further listed in Time magazine's Top 10 Fiction Books of 2010, The New York Times 100 Notable Books of 2010, and was one of Amazon.com's Top 10 SF/F Books for 2010.

==== Interior Chinatown ====
In 2020, Yu released his second novel, Interior Chinatown, which uses the screenplay format to tell the tale of Willis Wu, the "Generic Asian Man" who is stuck playing "Background Oriental Male" and occasionally "Delivery Guy" in the fictional police procedural Black and White but who longs to be "Kung Fu Guy" on screens worldwide. On January 27, 2020, Yu appeared on The Daily Show with Trevor Noah to discuss the book, as well as the lack of on-screen representation for Asian Americans and the Asian American "model minority myth". Yu further appeared on NPR's Weekend Edition with Scott Simon, January 25, 2020, and on the Los Angeles Review of Books Radio Hour with Medaya Ocher and Kate Wolf on February 3, 2020 to further discuss the novel.

Interior Chinatown won the 2020 National Book Award for Fiction and after being announced as a finalist, made the longlist of the 2021 Andrew Carnegie Medals for Excellence in Fiction and Nonfiction and was a finalist for the 2020 Prix Médicis étranger.

In an interview with Timothy Tau for Hyphen, Yu remarked that his influences for the novel included Paul Beatty's Man Booker Prize-winning novel The Sellout as well as the "cyclical structure" of the film Groundhog Day.

In October 2020, Hulu announced that they would be adapting the novel into a TV series. In 2022, details emerged that Taika Waititi would be an executive producer, Jimmy O. Yang would be starring as Willis Wu, and that Yu would be the showrunner. The ten-episode series premiered on Hulu on November 19, 2024.

=== Screenplays and TV writing ===
In 2016, Yu was a story editor for ten episodes of the first season of the 2016 HBO series Westworld, and co-wrote the episode "Trace Decay". For his work on the show, he received two Writers Guild of America Award nominations in 2017: Drama Series and New Series. In 2023, Taika Waititi announced Yu was working on the screenplay for his planned adaptation of Akira.

=== Other writing ===
Yu's non-fiction, essays, book reviews, journalism and other writing have also appeared online and in print in The Atlantic ( "The Pre-pandemic Universe Was the Fiction"), Slate (various reviews and articles on video games such as L.A. Noire and Portal 2), The Wall Street Journal ("Novelist Charles Yu on St. George California Reserve Agricole Rum"), Time ("What It's Like to Never Ever See Yourself on TV"), The Offing ("Thirteen Ways of Looking at 45" about the 45th president of the United States, Donald Trump), The New York Times Style Magazine ("George R. R. Martin, Fantasy's Reigning King"), McSweeney's Internet Tendency ("What Kind of World Is This?"), The Morning News ("Buffalo Wild Wings Grill & Bar", a review) and Polygon ("What future artificial intelligence will think of our puny human video games").

He is interviewed by and also interviews Lev Grossman in The Believer and comments on the work of Philip Roth (stating that he has "read more books by Roth than probably any other contemporary writer"), Don DeLillo, and Jonathan Lethem in installments of the "Influenced by" series published by Jaime Clarke in The Believer as well.

He has also written reviews in The New York Times Book Review of books (novels and short story collections) from Neal Stephenson, Joe Hill, Jasper Fforde and John Wray.

== Awards and accolades ==
- 2020: National Book Award for Fiction for the novel Interior Chinatown.
- 2017: Writers Guild of America Award Nominations: Drama Series and New Series for writing on HBO's Westworld.
- 2011: The Year's Best Science Fiction & Fantasy for the short story "Standard Loneliness Package", initially published in Lightspeed Magazine November 2010, Issue 6
- 2010: Second Place, John W. Campbell Memorial Award for Best Science Fiction Novel for the novel How to Live Safely in a Science Fictional Universe
- 2010: Second Best Science Fiction Novel, from the John Wayne and Elsie M. Gunn Center for the Study of Science Fiction at the University of Kansas for the novel How to Live Safely in a Science Fictional Universe
- 2007: Named a "5 under 35" honoree by the National Book Foundation by Richard Powers
- 2005: Robert Olen Butler Prize for the short story "My Last Days As Me", initially published in Sou'wester
- 2004: Sherwood Anderson Fiction Award for the short story "Third Class Superhero", initially published in Mid-American Review, Vol. XXV, No. 2

== Bibliography ==
=== Novels ===
- How to Live Safely in a Science Fictional Universe (2010, Pantheon ISBN 0-307-37920-5)
  - Second Place, John W. Campbell Memorial Award for Best Science Fiction Novel
  - Second Best Sci-Fi Novel, The John Wayne and Elsie M. Gunn Center for the Study of Science Fiction, The University of Kansas
  - One of Time magazine's Top 10 Fiction Books of 2010
  - One of The New York Times' 100 Notable Books of 2010
  - One of Amazon.com's Top 10 SF/F Books for 2010
- Interior Chinatown (2020, Pantheon Books. ISBN 9780307907196)
  - Winner, 2020 National Book Award for Fiction
  - Longlist, 2021 Andrew Carnegie Medals for Excellence in Fiction and Nonfiction
  - Finalist/Shortlisted, 2020 Prix Médicis étranger awards

=== Short story collections ===
- Third Class Superhero (2006, Harvest Books ISBN 0-15-603081-0)
  - "Third-Class Hero" originally appearing as "Class Three Superhero" in Mid-American Review, Vol. XXV, No. 2
    - The 2004 Sherwood Anderson Fiction Award from Mid-American Review
  - "My Last Days As Me" originally appearing in Sou'wester
    - Reprinted in the Robert Olen Butler Prize Stories 2004 and a 2005 Robert Olen Butler Prize Winner
  - "Problems for Self-Study" originally appearing in Harvard Review, Issue No. 23 (Fall 2002) (re-published at Harvard Review Online on April 18, 2011)
    - Yu's first published story
- Sorry Please Thank You: Stories (2012, Pantheon Books, Random House. ISBN 0-307-90717-1)

=== Uncollected short stories ===
- "Systems", The New York Times Magazine, July 7, 2020
- "Bounty", Xprize ANA "Avatars.Inc" Anthology (eBook and also online), March 2020
- "The Future of Work: Placebo", Wired, December 17, 2018
- "America, The Ride", Lightspeed, November 2018, Issue 102 (anthologized in Resist: Tales from a Future Worth Fighting Against, edited by Hugh Howey, Gary Whitta & Christie Yant (Broad Reach Publishing 2018))
- "NPC", Lightspeed, September 2018, Issue 100 (anthologized in Press Start to Play, edited by Daniel H. Wilson & John Joseph Adams (Vintage Books 2015))
- "Bookkeeper, Narrator, Gunslinger", Lightspeed, April 2017, Issue 83 (anthologized in Dead Man's Hand: An Anthology of the Weird West, edited by John Joseph Adams (Titan Books, 2014))
- "Subtext®: It Knows What You're Thinking Stop Thinking", Wired, December 13, 2016
- "Fable", The New Yorker, May 23, 2016, Fiction (May 30, 2016 Issue)
- "Re: re: Microwave in the break room doing weird things to fabric of spacetime", Motherboard, November 12, 2015

=== Non-fiction ===
==== Essays ====
- "The Pre-pandemic Universe Was the Fiction", The Atlantic, April 15, 2020
- "What It's Like to Never See Yourself on TV", TIME, January 21, 2020
- "George R. R. Martin, Fantasy's Reigning King", The New York Times Style Magazine, October 15, 2018
- "What Kind of World Is This?", McSweeney's Internet Tendency, September 7, 2018
- "What future artificial intelligence will think of our puny human video games", Polygon, January 9, 2018
- "Buffalo Wild Wings Grill & Bar", The Morning News
- "Thirteen Ways of Looking at 45", The Offing, May 2, 2017
- "Novelist Charles Yu on St. George California Reserve Agricole Rum", The Wall Street Journal, December 26, 2014
- "Gaming Club 2011: I have seen the future, and it is full of noobs like me.", Slate, December 15, 2011
- "L.A. Noire: The characters in the most realistic video games are still basically puppets.", Slate, December 14, 2011
- "Portal 2: How playing a video game is like writing fiction.", Slate, December 13, 2011

==== Book reviews ====
- "Short Stories From Joe Hill, Spiked With Mayhem and Evil", NYT Book Review, October 1, 2019
- "Neal Stephenson's New Novel — Part Tech, Part Fantasy — Dazzles", NYT Book Review, June 14, 2019
- "A Brilliantly Funny and Slightly Bonkers New Novel From Jasper Fforde", NYT Book Review, February 28, 2019
- "‘The Lost Time Accidents,’ by John Wray", NYT Book Review, February 21, 2016
- "‘Seveneves,’ by Neal Stephenson", NYT Book Review, May 31, 2015

== Filmography ==
Year	Title	Network	Creator	Writer	Executive producer	Notes
2016	Westworld	HBO	No	Yes (1)	No	Co-wrote "Trace Decay" with Lisa Joy; Also story editor
2018	Here and Now	HBO	No	Yes (1)	No	Also executive story editor
2018	Lodge 49	AMC	No	Yes (1)	No	
2019	Legion	FX	No	Yes (1)	Co-producer	Co-wrote "Chapter 23" with Olivia Dufault
2019	Sorry for Your Loss	Facebook Watch	No	Yes (1)	Producer	
2020	Dream Corp LLC	Adult Swim	No	Yes (2)	No	
2023	American Born Chinese	Disney+	No	Yes (1)	Yes	
2024	Interior Chinatown	Hulu	Yes	Yes (2)	Yes	Based on his novel of the same name
