= Chapter 23 (Legion) =

- Legion episode
- Episode no.: Season 3 Episode 4
- Directed by: Daniel Kwan
- Written by: Olivia Dufault; Charles Yu
- Cinematography by: Polly Morgan
- Editing by: Curtis Thurber
- Production code: XLN03004
- Original air date: July 15, 2019
- Running time: 50 minutes

Guest appearances
- Stephanie Corneliussen as Gabrielle Xavier; Pearl Amanda Dickson as Teen Syd; Vanessa Dubasso as Salmon

Episode chronology
← Previous "Chapter 22"	Next → "Chapter 24"
- Legion season 3

"Chapter 23" is the fourth episode of the third season of the American surrealist superhero thriller television series Legion, based on the Marvel Comics character of the same name. It was written by co-executive producer Olivia Dufault and co-producer Charles Yu and directed by Daniel Kwan. It originally aired on FX on July 15, 2019.

The series follows David Haller, a "mutant" diagnosed with schizophrenia at a young age, as he tries to control his psychic powers and combat the sinister forces trying to control him. Eventually, he betrays his former friends at the government agency Division 3, who label him a threat and set off to hunt him down. In the episode, David and Switch's travels through time start disrupting the fabric of time itself, unleashing time demons to haunt everyone.

According to Nielsen Media Research, the episode was seen by an estimated 0.277 million household viewers and gained a 0.1 ratings share among adults aged 18–49. The episode received critical acclaim, with many praising Kwan's directing, originality, visual style, performances and atmosphere.

== Plot ==
At the Division 3 aircraft, Ptonomy malfunctions with data loss. Kerry also experiences severe time jumps. Syd deduces that the time glitches are a result of the time travel provoked by David. While watching footage, they experience a time loop that causes a demon to almost get inside the aircraft, until Farouk chops off its arm.

David and Switch are now experiencing time loops, which also affect the time and space in the rest of the world. Switch suggests that they are pursued by Time Demons, beings living in space that can enter the real world through a glitch, which is done as Switch is traveling too far back in time. David, Switch and Lenny are then approached by the demons. Switch and Lenny escape the room while David unsuccessfully fights them. He ends up in a concentration camp, where he finds that the cellmate next to him is his mother Gabrielle.

The time glitches continue affecting the real world, including interrupting the series for an episode of The Shield. Farouk explains that the demons are known as Time Eaters, which feed on time through any anomaly. Syd then experiences hallucinations of meeting her younger self, allowing her to drink alcohol. Cary also discovers the demons, which causes him to break free from David's hypnosis. He finds Switch as they avoid the demons. Back in the cell, David realizes that this is an illusion. He then destroys the setting and confronts the demons, realizing that he is stuck in a loop and he cannot stop them.

Farouk, Kerry, and Clark arrive at "the time between time", a place where time does not exist, for which the motion pictures do not move. As they explore the area, they are attacked by demons. After escaping the compound, Cary and Switch use a phone booth to communicate with Division 3. Realizing the time error, Cary uses a specific code to transport both himself and Switch to the aircraft. Back in the compound, Lenny is tormented by the demons, who make her hallucinate the birth and death of her daughter with Salmon. Syd is also victim of the demons, who attack her as she waves goodbye to her younger self.

Fed up with the time loop, David uses his powers to show his dominance, killing one of the demons by immolating him. He warns the other demon to stop and go back to their home, threatening to kill every single demon. All demons banish from their spots, restoring time and space to the real world. David returns to the compound, finding a traumatized Lenny and realizes that Switch left with Cary. An angered David proclaims, "war".

== Production ==
=== Development ===
In June 2019, it was reported that the fourth episode of the season would be titled "Chapter 23", and was to be directed by Daniel Kwan and written by co-executive producer Olivia Dufault and co-producer Charles Yu. This was Dufault's second writing credit, Yu's first writing credit, and Kwan's first directing credit.

=== Writing ===
During the episode, the series passed from its original storyline and broadcast part of an episode of The Shield. Noah Hawley explained that as the theme of the episode involved messing with time, he also wanted the audience to experience the same. He said, "I think it's really interesting to see how the characters are dealing with time travel, but I also wanted to give the audience the experience of time travel. When we go back to the show, it's literally like you've traveled through time in a way that makes it much more visceral."

== Reception ==
=== Viewers ===
In its original American broadcast, "Chapter 23" was seen by an estimated 0.277 million household viewers and gained a 0.1 ratings share among adults aged 18–49, according to Nielsen Media Research. This means that 0.1 percent of all households with televisions watched the episode. This was a 26% decrease in viewership from the previous episode, which was watched by 0.370 million viewers with a 0.1 in the 18-49 demographics.

=== Critical reviews ===
"Chapter 23" received extremely positive reviews from critics. The review aggregator website Rotten Tomatoes reported a 100% approval rating with an average rating of 8.3/10 for the episode, based on 5 reviews.

Alex McLevy of The A.V. Club gave the episode an "A-" grade and wrote, "There's a lot going on in 'Chapter 23', but first, let's just take a moment and appreciate the truly unsettling creation of the Time Eaters. These villains, with their too-large smiles, blurred-out bodies, and time-glitching movements, are some of the creepiest innovations the show has ever concocted, and the struggle against their efforts to consume time itself makes this episode the closest the show has ever come to becoming an out-and-out horror story."

Nick Harley of Den of Geek gave the episode a 3.5 star rating out of 5 wrote, "While certain aspects of 'Chapter 23' felt silly, other moments, like Kerry lamenting the fact that the 'fun' is gone and everyone has changed, land perfectly. Legion still indulges itself a little too much, but as long as there are solid moments like that to keep the balance, I'll allow it." Kevin Lever of Tell Tale TV gave the episode a 4 star rating out of 5 and wrote, "'Chapter 23' uses the side threat of time demons to strike the ultimate blow to David's plans. It's through a lot of style, but provides the substance through a surprising turn for Aubrey Plaza's Lenny, and through David now having to face Division 3 in full force. This is a fun and effective episode."
