= Erin Soros =

Canadian author of short stories

- Education: University of British Columbia
- Writing career
- Genres: Short Stories; Essays
- Notable awards: Commonwealth Prize for the Short Story

Erin Soros is a Canadian author of short stories. She was awarded the University of British Columbia's Governor General's Gold Medal for a master's degree in 2001 and the Commonwealth Prize for the Short Story in 2006. Her fiction has been published widely in such journals as the Indiana Review and the Iowa Review. She is a two-time finalist for the Robert Olen Butler Prize, a winner of the Canadian Broadcasting Corporation's Bob Weaver award for short fiction and has been awarded 2nd prize for the prestigious Costa Short Story Award 2016.

One of her essays was named a notable essay in The Best American Essays 2005.

In 2023 she won a Writers' Union of Canada award for her account of forced psychiatric care after seeking mental-health help in a Vancouver hospital.

== Life ==
She holds a Master of Arts in English from the University of British Columbia, a Master of Fine Arts in writing from Columbia University and has completed her PhD program in the school of literature, drama and creative writing at the University of East Anglia.
