= Subtropics (journal) =

American literary journal

- Discipline: Literary journal
- Language: English
- Edited by: David Leavitt

Publication details
- History: 2006-present
- Publisher: University Press of Florida for the Department of English, University of Florida (United States)

Standard abbreviations
- ISO 4: Subtropics

Indexing
- ISSN: 1559-0704 (print); 2471-4526 (web)

Links
- Journal homepage

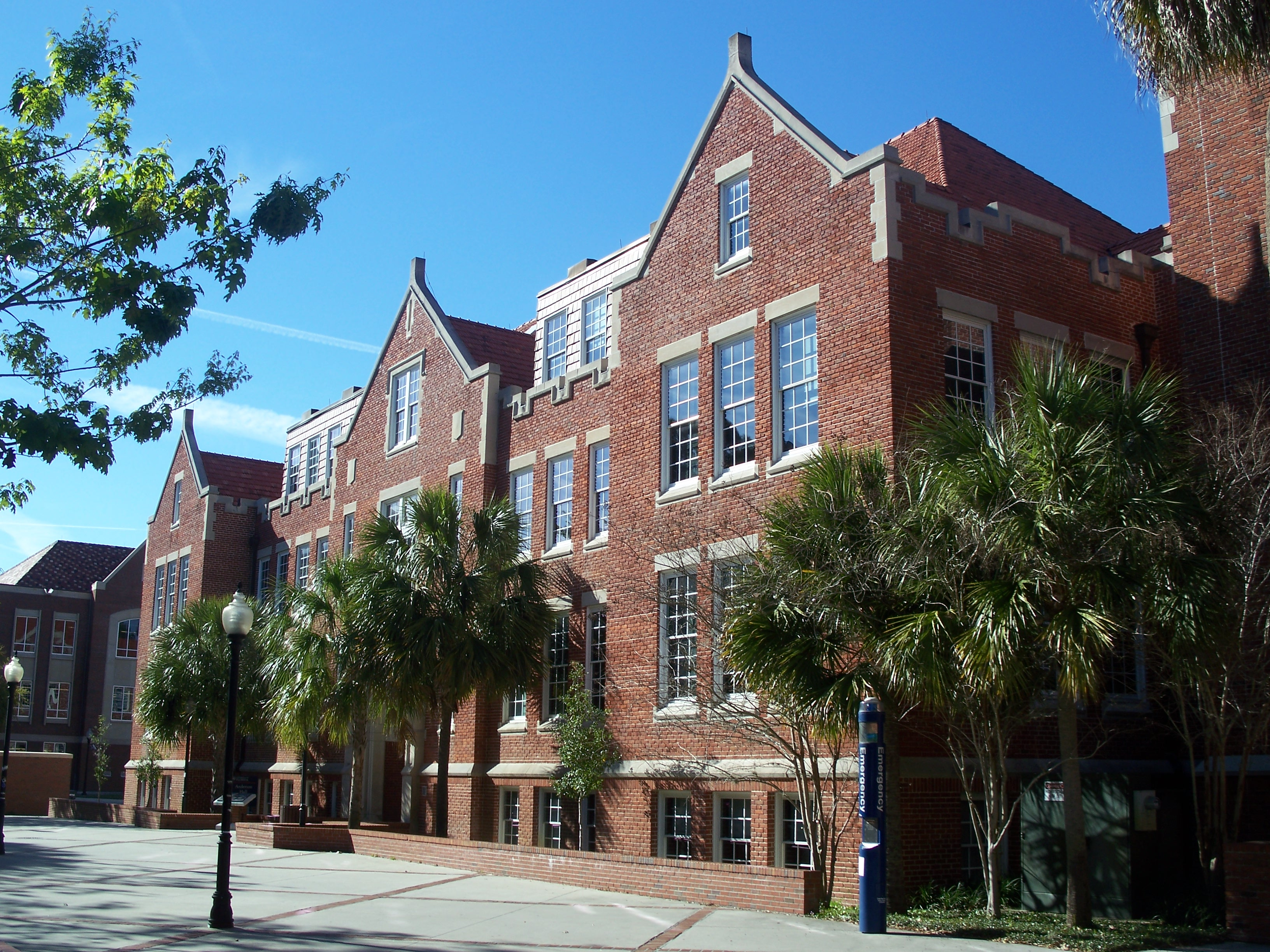
College of Liberal Arts and Sciences

Subtropics is a biannual American literary magazine and an official publication of the University of Florida, in Gainesville. Its predecessor was the long-defunct Florida Quarterly.

Founded in 2006, Subtropics publishes literary fiction, essays, poetry, and translations. It pays its writers at the high end of the industry—$1,000 for prose, $500 for short pieces, $100 for poetry. The magazine also offers constructive feedback.

Works originally published in Subtropics have been reprinted in Best American Poetry, The Best American Short Stories, Best American Nonrequired Reading, New Stories from the Midwest, New Stories from the South, the O. Henry Prize anthology, and the Pushcart Prize anthology.

Notable contributors include Seth Abramson, Steve Almond, Chris Bachelder, John Barth, Harold Bloom, Peter Cameron, Anne Carson, Billy Collins, Martha Collins, Mark Doty, Lauren Groff, Allan Gurganus, Amy Hempel, Bob Hicok, Roy Kesey, J. M. G. Le Clézio, Les Murray, Edna O'Brien, Lucia Perillo, D. A. Powell, Padgett Powell, A. E. Stallings, Olga Slavnikova, Ben Sonnenberg, Peter Stamm, Terese Svoboda, and Paul Theroux.

David Leavitt, the magazine's editor-in-chief, has said that Subtropics includes "a great diversity of voices and approaches," including stories that are formally experimental or fairly traditional, and stories featuring contemporary or historical themes.

== See also ==
- University of Florida
- University of Florida College of Liberal Arts and Sciences
- List of literary magazines
