= Annie Chang =

Taiwanese-American actress and producer

- Education: New York University Tisch School of the Arts, Stella Adler Studio
- Years active: 2007–present

Annie Chang is a Taiwanese-American actress and producer. She is best known for her recurring roles on the American series, Shades of Blue (2016–2017), Peacemaker (2022), Super Pumped (2022), and Interior Chinatown (2024).

== Education ==
Chang studied at New York University Tisch School of the Arts, Stella Adler Studio. Graduating with a Bachelor of Fine Arts in 2010.

== Career ==
In 2022 she had a prominent dual role in Peacemaker as both Detective Sophie Song and the alien leader, Eek Stack Ik Ik. Later in the year she recurred in Super Pumped as businesswoman, Angie You.

Chang went on to appear in Interior Chinatown as aspiring lawyer, Audrey Chan, in 2024.

== Filmography ==
=== Television ===
Year	Title	Role	Notes
2011	One Life to Live	Emma Sullivan	2 Episodes
2013	The Carrie Diaries	Stacy Ling	Episode: "The Long and Winding Road Not Taken"
2014	House of Cards	Feng's Assistant	Episode: "Chapter 18"
2015	Master of None	Caroline	Episode: "The Other Man"
2015	Donny!	Actress	Episode: "Boom Boom Abs!"
2016	The Jim Gaffigan Show	Franz	Episode: "The List"
2016–2017	Shades of Blue	Molly Chen	Recurring
2016, 2020	Karate Tortoise		Co-producer, Executive producer
2018	Bosch	Agent Wang	Episode: "Past Lives"
2018	The Couch	Hope	Episode: "#1.4"
2019	First Wives Club	Cori Park	Episode: "Vengeance"
2020	Grey's Anatomy	Tammi Oyadomari	Episode: "You'll Never Walk Alone"
2021	9-1-1	Ashley Ryerson	Episode: "The New Abnormal"
2022	Peacemaker	Det. Sophie Song	Recurring
2022	Super Pumped	Angie You	Recurring
2023	Barry	Josie	2 Episodes
2024	The Rookie	Officer Liz Diamond	3 Episodes
2024	Interior Chinatown	Audrey Chan	Recurring

=== Film ===
Year	Title	Role	Notes
2007	422	422	Short Film
2010	Sunday Morning Coming Down	Kerri	Short Film
2010	Apathy and Delirium	Natalie	Short Film
2014	Dead Boss	Top Dog	TV Movie
2016	Hard Sell	Mae	
2016	The Meaning of Christmas (Cookies)		Short Film
2018	The Wrong Mans	Katie	TV Movie
2019	Romantic Skeletons	Pam	Short Film
2020	The Greatest Gift	Elf	Short Film
2023	Deep State	DEA Agent	
2026	Uppercut	Marissa	Post-Production
TBA	Final Invasion	Navy Seal Jemma Wang	Pre-Production
TBA	Tramp	Nurse Lin	Pre-Production
