= Pola Oloixarac =

Argentine writer and journalist

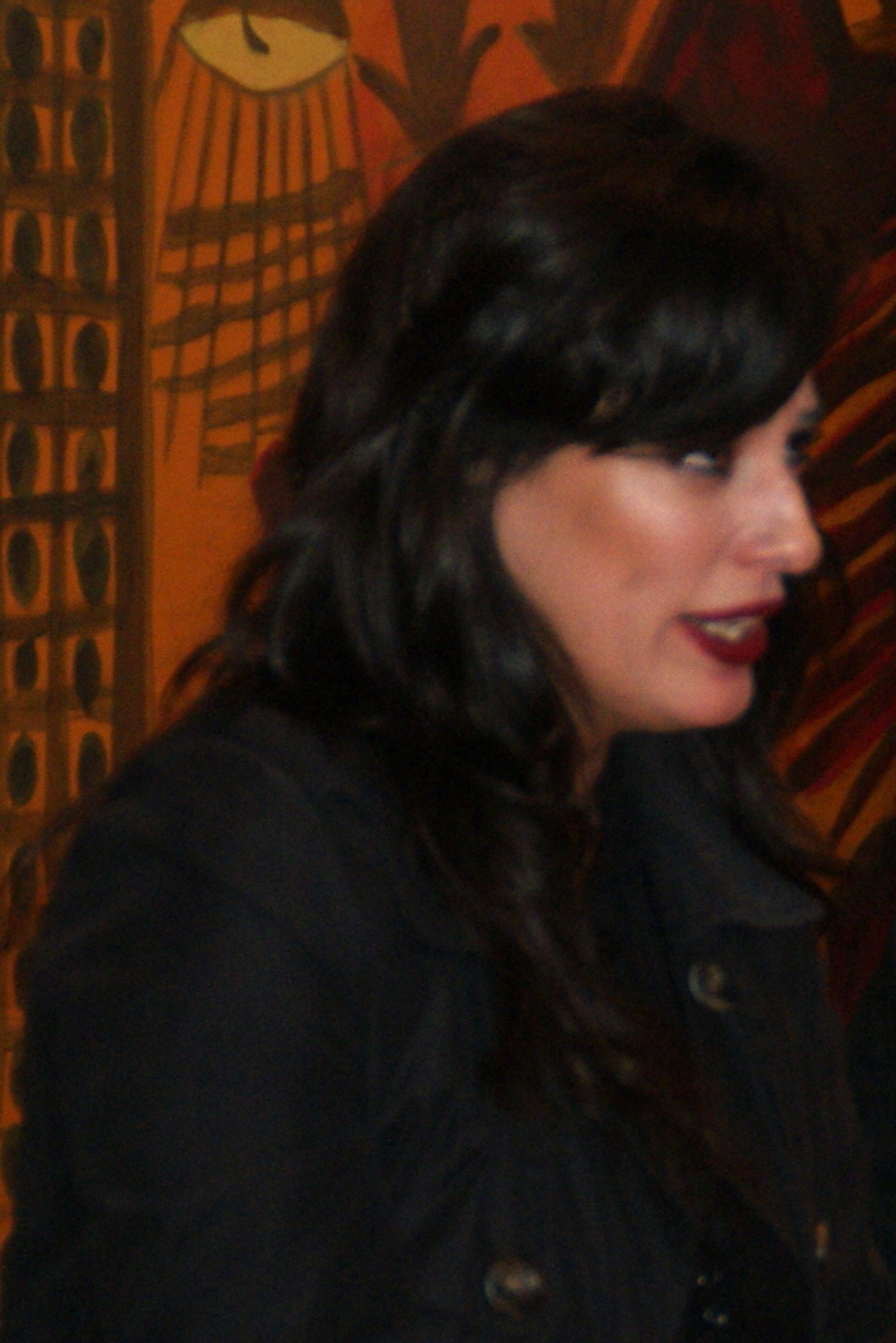
- Caracciolo in 2011
- Born: Paola Caracciolo; 13 September 1977 (age 48); Buenos Aires, Argentina
- Education: University of Buenos Aires
- Occupations: Writer; journalist; translator
- Writing career
- Years active: 2007–present

Paola Caracciolo, better known by her pseudonym, Pola Oloixarac, is an Argentine writer, journalist, librettist and translator. She lives in Barcelona since 2020.

== Biography ==
Oloixarac studied philosophy at the University of Buenos Aires. Since finishing her post-graduate studies for Ph.D. at Stanford University she has lived in Barcelona, Spain. Oloixarac has stated that she developed her pen name by writing her given name, Caracciolo, backwards.

She has written for publications including The New York Times, The Telegraph, Rolling Stone, Folha de Sao Paulo, Revista Clarín, Etiqueta Negra, Quimera, Brando, América Economía, among other media. She is a founding editor of The Buenos Aires Review, a bilingual journal featuring contemporary literature in the Americas.

Oloixarac has been invited to present her work and views on literature at universities such as Stanford, Harvard, Cornell, Dartmouth, University of Toronto, University of Florida, Americas Society, and literary festivals including Jaipur Literature Festival, LIWRE in Finland, Hay Cartagena, FLIP Brasil, Miami Book Fair, Marathon des Mots in Toulouse, FIL Lima, Crossing Borders Antwerp/The Hague.

Her best-selling first novel, Savage Theories (Las teorías salvajes, 2008), has been translated into French, Dutch, Finnish, Italian and Portuguese. It was published in English translation by Soho Press in January 2017. Savage Theories provoked critical and cultural controversy upon its release, with its subject matter and Oloixarac's public image coming under scrutiny. According to Oloixarac, "[t]he book has sparked verbal violence and a sexist uproar precisely because it doesn't deal with the issues that are traditionally associated with 'women's literature,' but instead contains a sociological critique that is both intelligent and satirical, which are apparently traits solely reserved for men."

Her third novel Mona (Spanish 2019, in English 2021) shows her as a satirist with a "taste for provocation", as its Guardian reviewer stated.

== Awards and honours ==
In 2010, she was chosen as one of Granta's Best Young Spanish Novelists. In the same year, she was invited to participate in the International Writing Program at the University of Iowa. She is the recipient of a literary award from the Fondo Nacional de las Artes.

In the UK she was awarded the 2021 Eccles Centre & Hay Festival Writer's Award and is an Eccles fellow at the British Library.

== Selected bibliography ==
- Las teorías salvajes (Buenos Aires: Alpha Decay, 2014)
- Las constelaciones oscuras (Buenos Aires: Random House, 2015)
- Mona (Buenos Aires: Random House, 2019)
- [with Esteban Insinger] Hércules en el Mato Grosso (Berlin: Sorry Press, 2023)
- Galería de celebridades argentinas (Buenos Aires: Libros del Zorzal, 2023)
- Bad Hombre (Buenos Aires: Random House, 2024)

=== In English ===
- Savage Theories, Roy Kesey, translator (New York: Soho Press, 2017)
- Dark Constellations, Roy Kesey, translator (New York: Soho Press, 2019)
- Mona, Adam Morris, translator (New York: Farrar, Straus, and Giroux; UK London: Serpent's Tail, 2021)
