= Annie Weatherwax =

Annie Weatherwax is an artist and author, most notable for her breakout novel, All We Had. Weatherwax is a known visual artist who describes her artistic voice as "comic realism." She often writes about social justice and the relationship between visual arts and writing. She has been influenced by the work of Flannery O'Connor, Alice Neel, Lorrie Moore, Roy Litchenstein, and Andy Warhol.

== Early life ==
Weatherwax has dyslexia and had a hard time in school growing up. She says, "I struggled a lot when I was kid. I'm an exceedingly slow reader. I read a lot, because I love it so much, but I definitely struggle with it." Despite her struggle with dyslexia, Weatherwax went on to graduate from the Rhode Island School of Design.

== Career ==
Weatherwax began her artistic career as a visual artist, working professionally sculpting superheroes and cartoon characters for Nickelodeon, DC Comics, Warner Brothers, and Pixar. She also paints.

== Writing ==
=== All We Had ===
Her book, All We Had, published in August 2014, was a finalist for the Massachusetts Book Award. The novel was also a pick for Oprah's Book Club and the Washingtonian's "Top 10 Books for August 2014." All We Had was optioned by Katie Holmes, who adapted the story into a movie in her directorial debut.

=== Awards and publications ===
As an author, she won the 2009 Robert Olen Butler Prize for Fiction, and her work has been published in The New York Times, The Sun Magazine, Ploughshares, The Southern Review, among others. In 2018, she was awarded a fellowship from Yaddo for her writing.
