= Cerebro =

Fictional device appearing in American comic books

- Emma Frost using Cerebro, from X-Men: Phoenix - Endsong #3 (February 2005). Art by Greg Land.

Publication information
- Publisher: Marvel Comics
- First appearance: Cerebro: The X-Men #7 (September 1964); Cerebra: New X-Men #114 (May 2001)
- Created by: Cerebro: Stan Lee and Jack Kirby; Cerebra: Grant Morrison and Frank Quitely

In story information
- Type: Detection device Computer; Quintessence carrier
- Element of stories featuring: X-Men

Cerebro (/səˈriːbroʊ/; Latin for 'brain'; from Latin cerebrum 'brain') is a fictional device appearing in American comic books published by Marvel Comics. Created by writer Stan Lee and artist Jack Kirby, Cerebro first appeared in The X-Men #7 (September 1964). Cerebro is a device used by the X-Men at the X-Mansion to detect and locate humans, particularly mutants. It was originally created by Professor X and Magneto, and later upgraded by Forge and Beast as Cerebra.

== Concept and creation ==
Cerebro in The X-Men #7 (September 1964). Art by Jack Kirby.

Cerebro first appeared in The X-Men #7 (September 1964), and was created by writer Stan Lee and artist Jack Kirby. Professor Jeffrey J. Kripal, in his 2011 book Mutants and Mystics: Science Fiction, Superhero Comics, and the Paranormal, calls Cerebro "a piece of psychotronics" and describes it as "a spiderlike, Kirby-esque system of machines and wires that transmitted extrasensory data into Professor Xavier's private desk in another room". Kripal notes that Cerebro made multiple subsequent central appearances, including Giant-Size X-Men #1 (1975), where Cerebro senses and locates a supermutant across the globe, resulting in the recreation of the X-Men team.

A sentient version of the character first appeared in Uncanny X-Men vol. 1 #360 (August 1998), and was created by writer Steven T. Seagle and artist Chris Bachalo.

Cerebra first appeared in New X-Men #114 (May 2001), and was created by writer Grant Morrison and artist Frank Quitely.

== Use and function ==
Cerebro amplifies the brainwaves of the user. In the case of telepaths, it enables the user to detect traces of others worldwide, also able to distinguish between humans and mutants. Depictions of Cerebro's strength have been inconsistent; at times in the storylines it could detect mutated aliens outside of the planet, when at others it could only scan for mutants' signatures in the United States. It is not clear whether it finds mutants by their power signature or by the presence of the X-gene in their body; both methods have been used.

Using Cerebro can be extremely dangerous, and telepaths without well-trained, disciplined minds put themselves at great risk when attempting to use it due to the psychic feedback that users experience when operating Cerebro. As the device greatly enhances natural psychic ability, users who are unprepared for the increased psychic input can be quickly and easily overwhelmed, resulting in insanity, coma, permanent brain damage, or even death. The one exception has been Magneto who has been said to have minor or latent telepathic abilities.

The only characters to use Cerebro on a frequent basis are Professor X, Jean Grey, Emma Frost, the Stepford Cuckoos, and Cassandra Nova, however, it has also been used by Cable, Rachel Summers, Kitty Pryde, Danielle Moonstar, Psylocke and Blindfold.

== History ==
Cerebro was a device built primarily within the X-Mansion. The early version was originally similar to a computer that was built into a desk in Charles Xavier's office, and operated on punched cards that did not require a user to interface. The device was later upgraded to the larger and more familiar telepathy-based technology with its interface helmet.

Cerebro is later modified by Forge with Shi'ar technology which connects with Professor X's hoverchair and the X-Men's Blackbird, but is destroyed to prevent the Phalanx from obtaining its information.

Cerebro gets corrupted by Bastion's nanotechnology, resulting in a self-aware entity called Cerebro Prime and the Founder who appears as an A.I. replica of Xavier. Cerebro splits into the Cerebrite Alpha and the Cerebrite Beta without exposing itself and utilizes its own team whose members possess powers specific of the powers of the X-Men and the Brotherhood of Mutants. Cerebro intends to put humans in stasis so mutants thrive by hunting down a group of synthetic children called the Mannites who possess vast psychic powers, but is destroyed by the X-Men with the help of Professor X and the Mannite Nina.

Cerebra is referred to as Celebro's "older sister" which is the size of a small room held in the basement of Xavier's School For Higher Learning, as well as X-Corporation. Cerebra is created by Beast (Hank McCoy) and later evolves into an artificial intelligence placed in an old Sentinel shell while capable of human emotion. Cerebra accompanies the X-Men to help find mutants and bring to X-Haven to be safe from the toxic Terrigen Mist. Cerebra is destroyed during a battle between the X-Men and Inhumans, but is transferred into a new robotic body.

The Krakoan Age reveals a portable version of Cerebro that can create copies of mutant minds, allowing them to be resurrected. There are five working cradles: one main unit and four backup units.

== Reception ==
In 2017, CBR ranked Cerebra 2nd in "X-Men: The 15 Best Sentinels" list.

== Other versions ==
- In Chris Claremont's X-Men: The End storyline, which takes place some 20 years ahead of standard continuity, Cerebro was replaced with the disembodied brain of Martha Johansson.
- In the universe of Marvel Zombies, zombified versions of Beast and Mr. Fantastic reprogram Cerebro to help them and the other zombies track down the last remaining humans on Earth. In Marvel Zombies Return, the surviving zombies escape to another world where many of them restart the original infection, fusing Professor X's body with Cerebro so that he can find humans for them.
- In the MC2 universe, the X-People carry "mini-Cerebros" that can detect mutants just as well as the full-size version.

== In other media ==
=== Film ===
Cerebro, as seen in the X-Men films.

- Cerebro appears in Generation X (1996). This version is a desktop personal computer with a few custom peripherals.
- Cerebro appears in X-Men (2000), voiced by Amy Leland. This version is a device that fills a massive spherical room in the X-Mansion's basement. The helmet interface is similar to the version seen in the comics, although the bulk of Cerebro's machinery is contained in the surrounding walls. While in use, three-dimensional images of the humans whose minds are being scanned by the device appear around the interface bridge. Unlike the comics' version, the film version can detect both human and mutant minds with ease.
- In X2, a similar version called Dark Cerebro is utilized by Colonel William Stryker in a bid to kill all mutants.
- In X-Men: First Class, an early version of Cerebro exists in an unnamed CIA science facility, created by Hank McCoy to amplify brainwaves (a slight departure from the source material). Cerebro is later destroyed by Riptide.
- Cerebro appears in X-Men: Days of Future Past, voiced by Hélène Cardona. It is a part of the X-Jet as a built in extension to Charles Xavier's hoverchair, and is made up of three sensor-pads and a 3D holographic projector.
- Cerebro appears in X-Men: Apocalypse, voiced again by Hélène Cardona. Apocalypse uses it to take control of Xavier's powers, but is destroyed by Havok.
- In this alternate timeline of Logan, the remains of Cerebro are used as a covering at Logan and Xavier's home at an abandoned smelting mill in Mexico, as it is the only material capable of containing Xavier's psychic seizures.
- Cerebro appears in Deadpool 2 when Wade Wilson tries and fails to use Cerebro to "look into the future".
- Cerebro appears in Dark Phoenix when Xavier uses it to navigate Jean Grey's mind and later to locate Grey, Magneto and Beast.

=== Television ===
- Cerebro appears in X-Men: The Animated Series, voiced by Cedric Smith. This version is used by Professor X and Jean Grey in various ways, such as increasing the former's powers, and detecting mutants. Another one is equipped with the Blackbird.
  - Cerebro and Cerebra appear in X-Men '97, voiced by Jennifer Hale.
- Cerebro appears in X-Men: Evolution. This version is a computer console with custom peripherals. A portable version is also constructed for the X-Men's travel and field missions.
- Cerebro appears in Wolverine and the X-Men. The present version is used by Emma Frost, and a possible future version is salvaged by Professor X to send messages to the past.
- Cerebro appears in the Black Panther episode "Black Panther vs. Juggernaut and Black Knight".
- Cerebra appears in Marvel Anime: X-Men, voiced by Danielle Nicolet.
- An early version of Cerebro appears in the Legion episode "Chapter 22", voiced by Hélène Cardona.
- Cerebro appears in the M.O.D.O.K. episode "The M.O.D.O.K. That Time Forgot!".

=== Video games ===
- Cerebro appears in X-Men Legends. This version is modeled after the device's film incarnation.
- Cerebro appears in Marvel: Ultimate Alliance.
- Cerebro appears in Marvel Puzzle Quest.
- Cerebro appears in Marvel Contest of Champions.
- Cerebro appears as a playable card in Marvel Snap.
- Cerebro is referenced as a four-part event titled "Cerebro Database" in Marvel Rivals.

=== Miscellaneous ===
- Cerebro appears in X-Men: The Cerebro Experience, voiced by Patrick Stewart.

=== Merchandise ===
- In 2025, Lego released a Cerebro toy as part of the "LEGO X-Men X-Mansion" set.
