= OverPower =

Collectible card game

- The card back of OverPower CCG
- Designers: Michael Stern, Theodore Stern, Ron Perazza, Steve Domzalski & Bill Jemas; Lazarus Rising Games Joseph Gagnepain, David McMillan, Keith Bursack, Shawn Sawyer.
- Publishers: Fleer
- Publication: 1995
- Players: 2
- Playing time: Approx 60 min
- Chance: Some

OverPower is a collectible card game originally produced by Fleer Corporation featuring characters from Marvel Comics and later from DC Comics and Image Comics. The rights to the game were acquired by Lazarus Rising Games, and it relaunched in 2024 using Edgar Rice Burroughs and public domain Characters. The game was initially launched in August 1995, with the new game being launched on Kickstarter on October 15, 2024. In the game, two players went head-to-head with teams of four heroes and villains. Unlike most other collectible card games, OverPower is not a resource management game, with play being distinct, and both strategically and structurally different from Magic: The Gathering.

== History ==
Overpower was produced by Fleer from the game's beginnings in the middle of 1995 until October 1997, when Fleer decided to end production in favor of its other products. In early 1998, Marvel Interactive became the sole producer and distributor of Overpower, taking it over from Fleer.

Eventually, Marvel decided to sell the exclusive rights to produce a collectible card game based on Marvel characters to Wizards of the Coast. Though fans kept playing the game, its popularity started to die off around 2001, when it had become increasingly clear through Marvel Interactive and Wizards of the Coast press releases that Overpower would no longer be supported.

In 2024, Lazarus Rising Games (LRG) purchased the game rights and brought OverPower back. They first launched a successful Kickstarter, and later issued a full release using Skybound Entertainment properties. They have also announced licensing deals with Top Cow Productions and future plans to issue cards based on The Boys (franchise). LRG has a website (https://overpowercardgame.com/) with information, card databases, and many resources for organized play. In 2025 and 2026 they have run successful Regional events across the United States and in Canada.

== Gameplay ==
A deck typically consists of any combination of four heroes and/or villains, three in the frontline and one in reserve. The rest of the deck consists of fifty-one cards representing offensive and defensive actions that can be taken by the characters or their allies. Each player also chooses a set of 7 mission cards, that represent their team's goals. Finally, each player may also have a homebase and/or a battlesite that represent where their team is from and where the battle will take place. The goal of the game is to either KO the opponent's entire team, or to complete all 7 mission cards (or defeat all 7 of the opponent's).

Players take turns playing attacks back and forth. During a battle, characters may become hurt, and if they are hurt enough, they may be KO'd and eliminated. In addition, each team ventures a number of mission cards, and the winner of the battle completes those missions, while the loser's missions are defeated. If neither team concedes, the team that did more damage to the other is the winner.

=== Characters ===
Each character card has a picture of the character or characters it represents, the name, and three or four numbers representing their power grid. In the initial game and its first few expansions, the only power grids were Energy, Fighting, and Strength, but in the DC Overpower Expansion Set, Intellect was introduced as the fourth type; it was needed for some of the DC characters, like Lex Luthor, whose main advantage was not their fighting or strength, or their powerful weaponry, but rather their ability to outwit their opponents. DC Overpower also introduced hero/villain codes; most characters and specials were labeled either as villains or heroes, and mixing the two was restricted in a DC-only game (no restriction in Marvel, Image or mixed games though). Characters are normally used only to represent the team a player is using, but they are also used as activators. A player's team consists of four characters: three on the front line, and one in reserve, who moves up to the front only when one of the other characters is KO'd.

=== Power cards ===
Power cards each consist of a number from 1 to 8 and a type, Energy, Fighting, Strength, Intellect, Multi-Power, or Any-Power. Power cards can be used as an attack of the level of the number, or as a defense of the level of the number. A character can play a power card whenever their grid is high enough. For instance, a character with 6 energy could play any energy power card from 1-6, but couldn't play 7s or 8s. (This requirement is the same on attack or defense.) Multipower power cards could be used in any of the types shown (either all four, or just Energy, Fighting, or Strength); their type may be chosen as they are played.

=== Special cards ===
Special cards each show the name of a particular character, and have a name and a description. Special cards can only be used by the character named on it. Specials serve a variety of purposes; some are attacks only, others can be used for defense only, while others affect the game in other ways, for instance healing hits that heroes have taken, or affecting missions directly, or interfering with the opponent's ability to play attacks. Some special cards are 'any hero' or 'any character' specials, and can be used by any character. Each character has their own unique set of specials. Some characters' specials are very straightforward attack or defense, while others have much more unusual abilities; this is how the unique character of the various superheroes and supervillains is shown in the game.

=== Universe cards ===
Universe cards come in a few categories, but generally are usable by any character that meets the usage requirement. For example, one type of universe card (basic universe cards) provide bonuses to power cards: such a universe card might be usable by any hero with a 7 or higher in strength, and provide a +2 bonus to a strength power card played with it. The most popular type of universe cards are teamwork cards, which themselves count as a level 6 attack, and give a bonus to a follow-up attack made by a teammate in a different power type than the original attack; this is popular because a level 6 attack is a relatively powerful attack, and the ability to make multiple attacks in a row is beneficial.

=== Tactic cards ===
These cards are seen much more rarely. Some tactic cards are doubleshot cards which lets two characters work together for a combined attack. The others are artifact cards, which either permanently or temporarily provide a benefit to one of the team members, such as enhancing their power grid.

=== Event cards ===
Event cards are not used in battle. Rather, event cards are played before a battle and then replaced; events can affect the coming battle or the state of the game in many ways, for instance, returning a KO'd character to play, disallowing the use of specials for the battle, etc. Each set of 7 mission cards comes with its own set of events.

=== Location cards ===
Locations have a name and describe a set of conditions for a team; usually, a list of six characters that can be used. In addition, they have an 'inherent ability' -- something that modifies the way the game is played. Locations can be used in two ways: either as a homebase or as a battlesite. When used as a homebase, one's team must match the team description, and the inherent ability applies to the game. Battlesites are somewhat different; they are an alternative to the ability to use 'any hero/character' specials. Instead of those specials, the deck may include character cards, called activators that appear on the list in the battlesite, and the battlesite itself may store specials those characters can play. A character card played as an activator is exchanged for one of that character's specials in the battlesite, which is then used like an 'any hero' special.

=== Attack, defense, and damage ===
Generally, the two players take turns attacking until one gives up or until both players are out of cards for the turn. Most attacks are numerical attacks, such as a power card attack against a character. Once an attack is made, the target has the opportunity to defend. A numerical defense can be played if the number played in defense is at least as big as the attack level (so a power card can be defended by any power card of equal or higher value, but type is unimportant). Cards other than power cards can also be used in defense; some universe cards can be used to provide a bonus to another defensive card, and specials can often defend against an attack. In some cases, specials that set up a lasting effect (for example "Hulk cannot attack or be attacked for remainder of battle") can be played as a defense. If a numerical attack isn't defended, it becomes a hit and immediately counts as damage.

Most numerical attacks are energy, fighting, strength, or intellect attacks, but some are multiple types, and some have no type. Characters are KO'd in one of two ways. Cumulative KO occurs when a character has taken 20 total damage, regardless of how many attacks or what types they are. Spectrum KO occurs when a character has taken damage in three of the four different power types: multi-type hits can be changed retroactively in order to make spectrum KO occur.

Some attacks are non-numerical (for instance, specials that say "Target opponent cannot attack for remainder of battle"). Such attacks can generally only be defended by specials; if they are not defended they do no damage, but instead the described effect takes place. If they are defended, nothing happens.

If a player doesn't wish to make an attack, they have the option of conceding the battle instead. If they don't concede, their opponent will get a chance to attack them next.

=== Battle phases ===
Each battle consists of several phases: first, each player draws 8 cards. Then, each player discards duplicate cards until they have only one of each type. (What is considered the same for duplicate purposes varies among the card types. For instance, two power cards are considered duplicates if they have the same number, even without the same type, whereas two special cards are only duplicates if they are exactly the same special). Players also discard unusable cards. Next, players take turns 'placing' cards. Cards, generally, can be placed on a character that can use them. Placed cards can only be played by the character they are placed on. The advantage to this is that placed cards that are unused at the end of a battle remain where they are, whereas unused cards in a player's hand are discarded. Each character may have one of each of the four types of cards placed on it: power cards, specials, universe cards, or tactic cards. After placing, the players decide on their venture—how many missions they are willing to risk on the battle. Then, the battle itself takes place. After the winner is determined, the next battle begins.

=== Strategy elements ===
Some of the interesting aspects of strategy in Overpower are the following. First of all, specials are often more powerful than other cards but they have the disadvantage that only one character can use them. It is critical not to make a deck too overloaded with one character's specials unless that character can be defended very well; otherwise, the deck would be badly crippled once that character is KO'd. Teams typically share certain power grid similarities, especially high ones. For instance, a team may consist of various characters with 7 or higher Energy ratings. This way, high-level power cards can be energy and usable by all characters.

Another key tactic in OverPower is the idea of placing and conceding: the idea is to take some time to heavily arm your team. Your opponent may gain a mission or two but you may get a significant advantage in the battles that follow. However, placing also reveals more information to your opponent about the cards you have available to use for the round.

Many characters have specials that allow them to avoid an attack, creating an incentive to attack other characters. Similarly, some characters have specials that allow a teammate to avoid an attack, creating opportunities for bluffing. Players may choose a dangerous character that has an avoid special, but not play any, while still acting as if they might have one. Having a good poker face, and bluffing often, are considered very useful skills in Overpower.

== Card sets ==
- Marvel OverPower - The original release of the game, released middle 1995 by Fleer. Easily identified by the solid gold graphic on the borders of Special cards.
- Powersurge - Released late 1995. Easily identified by the flame graphics on the borders of Special cards.
- Mission Control - Released early 1996, introduced event cards. Easily identified by the computer chip graphics on the borders of Special cards.
- DC OverPower (aka Batman/Superman OverPower, since all its characters were from these two heroes' storylines) - Released middle 1996, introduced the Intellect Power type. This set also introduced the inherent abilities, a line of text present in some character cards that enhanced (or restricted, in some cases) the character; and the allies, a new type of universe card.
- IQ OverPower - Released late 1996, brought the Intellect Power type to Marvel characters, reprinting the many Marvel characters released so far, now with Intellect values. This set also introduced eight new heroes.
- JLA OverPower (JLA stands for Justice League of America) - Released early 1997, introduced the new tactic (doubleshot) cards.
- Monumental OverPower - Released middle 1997, introducing the notion of location and tactic cards that would add yet more depth to the game with certain entirely new mechanics. The 289-card set was sold in 65-card starter decks and 15-card booster packs.
- Classic OverPower - Released late 1997, introducing artifacts, a new type of tactic card. This was last set produced by Fleer. One of the most sought after boxes and most difficult sets to complete. Due to a list count only 5000 boxes were manufactured by Fleer Corp. It was sold in 15-card booster packs.
- Image OverPower - Planned for November 1997, it was released in mid 1998, it was the first set released after Marvel Interactive assumed responsibility for the game's development and production. These cards are the rarest and most valuable, being highly sought after by collectors. This set had a smaller print run than other OverPower sets, so the scarcity of boxes have resulted in high prices in the secondary market. As strange as it may seem at first, a quirk with this release saw Marvel Comics' very first expansion after acquiring the rights to Overpower from Fleer feature absolutely no Marvel characters whatsoever, but rather exclusively using the intellectual property of a direct competitor of theirs, what with characters who were owned and published solely by Image Comics at the time.
- X-Men OverPower - Released January 1999, was the second set made by Marvel and the last OverPower set that would be released until the game's 2020s revival. Due to a list count known and credited there have been less than 5000 boxes produced. It introduced aspects designed to make locations more useful with the innovative concept of homebases and deck building. X-Men Overpower cards were cut incorrectly inadvertently being slightly larger than the other cards, which made decks mixing X-Men overpower sets easier to remember which cards are in what order! Cards had to be put into sleeves to protect the integrity of the card.
- Edgar Rice Burroughs and the World Legends OverPower - Launching in October 2024, the ERB & the World Legends set pits the classic pulp characters like Tarzan and John Carter of Mars against legends of yesterday including Zeus, The Time Traveler, Sherlock Holmes and Watson, Mina Harker, Hyde and many more. This set is the first official set of OverPower to be sold since the 90's and is the kickoff of the new version of OverPower.
- SkyBound OverPower - Release in August 2026, this set was the second release on their schedule, featuring characters from The Walking Dead - including Rick, Michonne, Negan, Ezekiel; as well as Invincible - including Omni-Man, Invincible, Atom Eve, Rex Splode, and Battle Beast.
- Top Cow OverPower - Released projected for Q2 2026 or early 2027, this was the second license announced by Lazarus Rising Games and will feature Image Comics characters from one of their companies Top Cow - Including The Witchblade, The Darkness, The Angelus, CyberForce, Cyber Data, Dr. David Loren, and many more. With Top Cow's universe being built around the existence of 13 Artifacts, its likely this set will be where LRG's reintroduces the Artifact mechanic to the game.

Due to OverPower's immense popularity despite being out of print for almost 2 decades, many fan-made sets have been created by the game's dedicated fanbase. None of these were officially licensed, printed, or released. The most notable of fan-made OverPower sets includes The Marvels, a fan release based on the discovered notes for Marvel's final set of OverPower which was never officially released.

== Promo cards ==
Besides the expansion sets, many Overpower cards were released as special promotions. The original Any Hero specials, by example, were comic book inserts in various Marvel comic books released in October 1995. Most promotional cards were never released in any expansion set, but some were reprinted in Mission Control and Monumental OverPower, but with different artwork. Promotional cards were considered legal to use in tournament decks. A list of all existing promotional cards follows:

- Original Marvel Any Hero Specials - 5 Any Hero special cards, available as random inserts in the following Marvel comics, one per comic, all released in October 1995: Amazing Spider-Man #406, Avengers #391, Captain America #444, Daredevil #345, Excalibur #90, Fantastic Four #405, Green Goblin #1, Incredible Hulk #434, Iron man #321, Spider-Man #63, Starjammers #1, Thor #491, Uncanny X-Men #325, Web of Spider-Man #128, X-Factor #115, X-Force #47, X-Man #8 and X-Men #45.
- Web-Headed Wizard Any Hero Special - Available as an insert in Wizard Magazine #50 (Oct 1995).
- Oversized 5" by 7" Hero Placards - Identical to the character cards of the original Marvel OverPower, but bigger. Available as a Mail-Away offer, in three groups of 13 placards each, in the following magazines: Wizard Magazine #52 (Oct 1995), InQuest Magazine (Dec 1995) and OverPower Legion Monthly Venture #4 (Summer 1996).
- Hillshire Farms Expansion Set - 10 characters (5 reprints from Marvel OverPower, 4 reprints from Powersurge and 1 new, Doppelganger), 9 specials (1 Any Hero and 8 for existing OverPower and Powersurge characters) and 1 universe card, all related to Spider-Man storyline. Available as inerts in boxes of Lunch 'N Munch Hillshire Farms pre-packaged lunches, 2 per box, Summer 1996. The Any Hero special was reprinted in the IQ OverPower set. Doppelganger was reprinted in the Monumental OverPower set.
- Powersurge Any Hero Specials - 2 Any Hero special cards, Confusion and Savage Land, available as inserts in the InQuest Magazine #9 (Jan 1996) and Combo Magazine #21 (Feb 1996), respectively.
- Fighting 6 Prototype card - A level 6 Fighting power card, slightly different from the one released with Marvel Overpower. Available as an insert in Ventura Magazine #1 (July/August 1995), and in OverPower Legion Monthly Venture (the official OverPower newspaper) #5 (Nov 1996).
- Prerelease Event cards - 2 event cards, available as inserts in Inquest Magazine #13 (Jan 1996), Wizard Magazine #57 (May 1996) and Wizard Wolverine Tribute Edition Magazine (Fall 1996), 1 per magazine. Both would be released in the Mission Control set.
- Galactus character card - Available as an insert in OverPower Legion Monthly Venture #2 (April 1996).
- Captain Universe card - A universe card, available as an insert in Wizard Magazine #58 and InQuest Magazine #14, both June 1996.
- OverPower Powersurge Invincibles - 1 character (Adam Warlock) and 3 specials, available on purchasing Kay-Bee Toys Exclusive OverPower Powersurge Invincibles action figures, Winter 1996. There were four different figures (Adam Warlock, Bone Claws Wolverine, Scarlet Spider and Night Armor Iron Man), each came with a different card. Those 4 cards were reprinted in the Monumental Overpower set.
- Hideout Discovered! Any Mission Event - Given to the attendants of GenCon'96, held at Milwaukee, Wisconsin, August 1996.
- Onslaught OverPower Expansion Set - 34 cards, being 4 characters (Dark Beast, Holocaust, Onslaught and Post ), 18 specials (6 for each character except Dark Beast), 1 mission of 7 cards and 5 events. The characters, specials and events were available as random inserts in the following Marvel Comics, 2 per comic, all released in October 1996: Amazing Spider-Man #416, Cable #36, Excalibur #102, Incredible Hulk #446, The Sensational Spider-Man #9, Spectacular Spider-Man #239, 2099: World of Tomorrow #2, X-Factor #127, X-Force #59 and X-Man #20. The cards had borders that were unique. The mission cards (and also the characters) were randomly inserted in packs of Marvel Ultra Onslaught Trading Cards, released Fall 1996, at the rate of 1 per 9 packs. All cards were obtainable through a mail-away offer with the purchasing of IQ OverPower booster packs. The characters, but not the specials were reprinted with new artwork in the Monumental OverPower set. Two additional new specials for each character (except for Dark Beast) were released in subsequent Overpower sets.
- DC Any Character Specials - 6 Any Character special cards. Arkham Asylum could be obtained purchasing a sealed box of DC OverPower at the Berkeley Games Distributor. Likewise, The Fortress of Solitude could be obtained purchasing a sealed box at the WarGames West Distributor, and came as an insert in OverPower Legion Monthly Venture #7 (Apr 1997). The Batcave and Deal with the Devil were available as inserts in Combo Magazine #23 and Tuff Stuff's Collect Magazine (both Nov 1996). Justice League of America was a prize in a sanctioned tournament in 1997, and Urban Hunters was obtainable through an exclusive DC Comics SASE offer (Spring 1997).
- Batman Holographic character cards - 6 variant character cards from the Batman storyline, randomly inserted in packs of the Batman Holo Series Trading Cards (1 per 72 packs), Winter 1996.
- Any Power level 5 power card - Released as an insert in Combo Magazine #24 (Jan 1997).
- Marvel vs Wildstorms Chromium character cards - 8 character cards, being 5 new (Black King, Brass, Crystal, Team X and Wynonna Earp) and 3 variant characters, randomly inserted in packs of Marvel vs Wildstorms Trading Cards, released Summer 1997, at the rate of 1 per 7 packs.
- Beyonder character card - Available as an insert in OverPower Legion Monthly Venture #6 (March 1997). Beyonder's power grid contained 4 "infinite" symbols. Unlike Galactus, who had all 8's in 3 stats, Beyonder cannot just play "any" power card. He came with a special set of rules that stated his power grid was the combined total of all other active characters on his team. Thus, when a character gets KOed, Beyonder's stats could potentially be reduced. If he was the last character on a team, he maintained the power grid of the last active teammate. In addition, his inherent ability to play "any" non-OPD special, was limited to only specials of characters in your deck, to prevent abuse.
- Accidental Inserts - 6 cards (1 Any Character special, 1 location, 2 universe cards and 2 tactic cards), meant to be promotional cards but accidentally inserted in some Classic OverPower packs, became ultra-rare cards. The location and one of the tactic cards were reprinted in the X-Men OverPower set.
- Spawn Finite Power special card - Given to the attendants of Wizard World Convention, held at Chicago, Illinois, July 1998, this card was incorrectly cut. A correctly cut version was given as a prize at tournaments in 1999. This card was reprinted with the same artwork in the Image OverPower set. Originally intended to be an 'Any Hero' special, this card was mistakenly printed as a Spawn Special Card. Instead of fixing it, it was just decided that the card would play as printed.
- MegaPower Expansion Set - 10 cards, being 1 location and 9 specials for X-Men storyline characters, available for selling at the official OverPower website at Winter 1999. The Specials were meant to be part of the X-Men OverPower set, but were left out.
- Warlock character card - Available as an insert in Wizard Magazine #96 and InQuest Gamer Magazine #52, both released August 1999.

Lazarus Rising Games has released several promos associated with the North American OverPower League Tournament circuit, which are limited edition (printed quantities in the low 100's) and available for purchase at www.theOrangeKing.com

== Reception ==
Steve Faragher reviewed original Marvel Overpower for Arcane magazine, rating it a 7 out of 10 overall. Faragher comments that "Overpower [is] a great value for your money game"

Steve Mayne for Medium.com reviewed the Lazarus Rising Games re-release of the beloved game, commenting that "I like this game. I had fun with it back then and am enjoying it now. As I said, I look forward to playing in a beginner tournament or learning game."

== Reviews ==
- Australian Realms #26
