= Roy Kesey =

American author

Roy Kesey is an American author. His books include Any Deadly Thing, Pacazo, All Over, Nothing in the World and an historical guide to the city of Nanjing, China.

His short fiction has been included in Best American Short Stories and such journals as Subtropics, The Georgia Review and The Iowa Review. His story "Double Fish" won the 2009 Jeffrey E. Smith Editors' Prize from The Missouri Review.

In addition to his work as a writer, Kesey has translated two novels by Pola Oloixarac, Savage Theories and Dark Constellations.
