= Lynn Veach Sadler =

American poet, writer, and playwright

- Education: Duke University (BS); University of Illinois (MA, PhD)
- Occupations: Poet; writer; college president
- Writing career
- Language: English

Mary Lynn Veach Sadler is an American poet, writer, and playwright.

== Biography ==
A native of North Carolina, she holds a doctorate and a master's degree from the University of Illinois and a bachelor's degree from Duke University. She formerly served as Vice president and Dean of Academic Affairs at Methodist College (now Methodist University) and as President of Johnson State College in Vermont. She is a member of the North Carolina Playwright’s Alliance. She currently works as a full-time writer, and her work has appeared in hundreds of print and electronic publications.

== Awards ==
- Distinguished Woman of North Carolina, 1992
- Panelist Choice Award, Albee Last Frontier Theatre Conference, 2000
- Pittsburgh Quarterly Hay Prize, 2001
- Sue Saniel Elkind Poetry Contest, First Place tie, 2002
- Cape Fear Crime Festival Award, 2002
- Cecil Hemley Memorial Award, Poetry Society of America, 2003
- Lee Witte Poetry Contest, Mount Olive Review, 2003
- Robert Olen Butler Prize (Del Sol Press), Top Ten Finalist, 2004
- Charles Dickson Chapbook Prize, Georgia Poetry Society, 2005
- Pinter Review Prize for Drama, Silver Medalist, 2005
- Abroad Writer’s Contest/Fellowship (France) 2006
- Bards and Sages Writing Competition, 2nd Place, 2006
- Good Reads Fiction Book Competition, Honorable Mention, 2007
- Beach Book Festival, Honorable Mention, 2008
- Judith Seigel Pearson Award, Wayne State University, 2008
- Gilbert-Chappell Distinguished Poet, North Carolina Poetry Society 2013

== Books ==
- Margaret Drabble, Twayne Publishers (University of Michigan), 1986
- Tonight I Lie with William Cullen Bryant, Publishers Circulation Corp, 1998
- Poet Geography, Mount Olive College Press, 2003
- The Men of Endor: Their Works and Times, 1861-1876 (with Robert Albert Wiesner), Railroad House Historical Association, 2006
- Foot Ways, Bards and Sages Publishing, 2007
- Not Dreamt of In Your Philosophy, Bards and Sages Publishing, 2008
