= Cerebro's X-Men =

Fictional team of supervillains

Publication information
- Publisher: Marvel Comics
- First appearance: Uncanny X-Men (Vol. 1) #360 (October 1998)
- Created by: Carlos Pacheco

In-story information
- Member(s): Cerebro; Grey King; Crux; Rapture; Landslide; Mercury; Chaos

Cerebro's X-Men are a team of supervillains appearing in American comic books published by Marvel Comics. They are a nanotechnology version of the X-Men created by Cerebro after the supercomputer briefly goes rogue.

This team was created and designed by Spanish artist Carlos Pacheco, who also drew them for the cover of Uncanny X-Men #360 (1998). The characters appeared in two issues of the Uncanny X-Men series and one issue of the X-Men series. The team's primary purpose is to help Cerebro catalog all mutants on Earth, but Cerebro intends to cryogenically preserve the mutants it captures and its team kidnaps and fights other mutants.

== Fictional team history ==
Cerebro, a device created by X-Men founder Charles Xavier to help locate mutants, is confiscated by Bastion during the events of "Operation: Zero Tolerance". Bastion attempts to access secret files and operate Cerebro, but Cerebro activates a computer virus to erase this information rather than letting it be stolen. However, the combination of Cerebro's power with Bastion's nanotechnology gives Cerebro sentience. Cerebro creates a body for itself, escapes Bastion's headquarters, and tries to follow its original programming literally: find, catalog, and register mutants. However, a large part of its plan to catalog mutants is to capture and cryogenically preserve them for study. Cerebro begins its new mission by creating its own version of the X-Men, Professor X's team. It manages this by using Bastion's nano-technology to combine the profiles and powers of several mutants in Professor X's database to create new mutants.

When the X-Men confront him, Cerebro absorbs his X-Men into his body, assuming a monstrous cybernetic form. Professor X subdues Cerebro, purging its systems and destroying its body.

== Roster ==
- Cerebro / The Founder / Cerebro Prime – The X-Men's mutant detecting computer, given physical form when a nano-tech computer virus corrupted its systems.
- Crux – Cristal Lemieux is a French ice skater with the ability to generate fire and ice, which envelop halves of her body when her powers are active. Crux was based on Iceman and Sunfire, with a personality akin to Jubilee.
- Grey King – Addison Falk possesses telepathic and telekinetic abilities which allow him to neutralize mutant powers. Grey King was based on Jean Grey (Phoenix), with a personality akin to Magneto.
- Landslide – Lee Broder is a Southern redneck with ape-like strength and agility and large hands and feet. He is based on Blob and Beast.
- Mercury – Mercury is a hitman who can turn his skin into metal and has powerful claws. Mercury is patterned after the powers and personality of Colossus and Wolverine.
- Rapture – Sister Joy is a blue-skinned nun with dove-like wings and sword-fighting skills. Rapture is shown to be in love with Grey King. She was based on Archangel, with aspects of Mystique, Nightcrawler, and Shadowcat.
- Chaos / Kaos – Dan Dash is an autistic man who can generate concentric plasma waves from his left eye. Chaos was patterned after the powers of both Cyclops and Havok.
