= Chapter Sixty-One: Halloween =

- Riverdale episode
- Episode no.: Season 4 Episode 4
- Directed by: Erin Feeley
- Written by: Janine Salinas Schoenberg
- Production code: T13.21854
- Original air date: October 30, 2019
- Running time: 42 minutes

Episode chronology
← Previous "Chapter Sixty: Dog Day Afternoon"	Next → "Chapter Sixty-Two: Witness for the Prosecution"

"Chapter Sixty-One: Halloween" is the fourth episode of the fourth season of the American television series Riverdale and the 61st episode of the series overall. The episode was directed by Erin Feeley and written by Janine Salinas Schoenberg.

It originally aired on The CW on October 30, 2019 and according to Nielsen Media Research, was watched by 0.74 million viewers.

== Plot ==
On the eve of Halloween, Riverdale families receive videotapes of their houses being watched for hours upon hours. As Halloween approaches, Cheryl and Toni re-bury Jason’s body, but Cheryl is worried that Jason’s ghost will now haunt Thistlehouse. After a seance in the Blossom chapel, Nana Rose reveals that Cheryl was supposed to have a second brother named Julian, but she absorbed him before birth. Meanwhile, at Stonewall Prep, Jughead’s classmates haze him and lock him inside a coffin in Mr. Chipping’s office for Halloween night. Elsewhere, Archie and Munroe throw a Halloween party for the kids of the community in order to keep Dodger away, but the party ends in Dodger shooting one of the kids who attended the party. Veronica wards off an escaped patient from Shady Grove, as he poses as another man and tries to murder her in the speakeasy. Betty and Jellybean, while home alone, receive phone calls by someone claiming to be the Black Hood. When Charles tracks the phone calls, Betty learns that they are coming from Polly. An ominous closing flash-forward shows F.P. and Betty at the coroner’s office identifying what appears to be Jughead's dead body.

== Cast and characters ==
This episode includes some characters dressed in Halloween costumes:

=== Starring ===
- KJ Apa as Archie Andrews / Pureheart the Powerful
- Lili Reinhart as Betty Cooper / Laurie Strode
- Camila Mendes as Veronica Lodge
- Cole Sprouse as Jughead Jones
- Madelaine Petsch as Cheryl Blossom / Poison Ivy
- Mark Consuelos as Hiram Lodge
- Casey Cott as Kevin Keller
- Skeet Ulrich as F.P. Jones
- Mädchen Amick as Alice Cooper
- Charles Melton as Reggie Mantle
- Vanessa Morgan as Toni Topaz / Harley Quinn

=== Guest starring ===
- Eli Goree as Munroe "Mad Dog" Moore / The Shield
- Cody Kearsley as Moose Mason
- Wyatt Nash as Charles Smith
- Juan Riedinger as Dodger Dickenson
- Tiera Skovbye as Polly Cooper (voice)
- Kerr Smith as Principal Holden Honey
- Sam Witwer as Rupert Chipping
- Alex Barima as Johnathan
- Ben Cotton as Michael Matthews
- Sean Depner as Bret Weston Wallis
- Sarah Desjardins as Donna Sweett
- Ajay Friese as Eddie
- Trinity Likins as Jellybean Jones / Rosie the Riveter
- Doralynn Mui as Joan
- Alvin Sanders as Pop Tate
- Barbara Wallace as Rose Blossom

=== Co-starring ===
- Trevor Stines as Jason Blossom
- Nikolai Witschl as Dr. Curdle Jr.

== Music ==
Riverdale: Special Halloween Episode (Original Television Score)

Soundtrack album by Blake Neely and Sherri Chung
- Released: October 31, 2019
- Recorded: 2019
- Genre: Soundtrack
- Length: 33:17
- Label: WaterTower Music

Blake Neely and Sherri Chung chronology
Riverdale: Season 2 (Original Television Score) (2018)	''Riverdale: Special Halloween Episode (Original Television Score)'' (2019)	Riverdale: Season 3 (Original Television Sore) (2021)

Riverdale soundtracks chronology
Heathers: The Musical (2019)	Halloween (2019)	Hedwig and the Angry Inch (2020)

On October 31, 2019, WaterTower Music released the score soundtrack from the "Halloween" episode was composed by Blake Neely and Sherri Chung. Haley Reinhart's "Shook", Ural Thomas & the Pain's "Eenie Meenie" and The Chordettes' "Mr. Sandman" are heard in the episode, but not included in the soundtrack.

All music is composed by Blake Neely and Sherri Chung.

Track listing
No.	Title	Length
1.	"Video Tape / Say Goodbye to Jason"	2:26
2.	"Halloween Costumes / The Stonewall Four"	1:44
3.	"Jason’s Ghost is Mad / Jughead Gets Drugged"	1:45
4.	"Trick or Treat / Jughead Wakes in a Coffin"	1:30
5.	"Have You Checked the Children?"	1:20
6.	"Dodger at the Party"	1:11
7.	"Time for a Treat / Twins Are Sleeping"	1:23
8.	"Caught Red-Handed / Bloody Jellybean"	1:43
9.	"Buried Alive / Pressured by Honey"	2:01
10.	"Keep the Party Going / Julian Moving the Board"	3:04
11.	"Agree to Your Terms"	1:34
12.	"Tracing the Caller"	2:53
13.	"The Family Man / Hiding in the Dark"	2:19
14.	"Invited to the FBI"	0:49
15.	"The Morning After"	2:28
16.	"Prank Gone Too Far"	1:39
17.	"All Ends Well??"	3:28
Total length:		33:17

== Reception ==
=== Ratings ===
In the United States, the episode received a 0.2/1 percent share among adults between the ages of 18 and 49, meaning that it was seen by 0.2 percent of all households, and 1 percent of all of those watching television at the time of the broadcast. It was watched by 0.74 million viewers.

=== Critical response ===
On Rotten Tomatoes, the episode has a rating of 86%, based on 7 reviews.

== See also ==
- Archie's Super Teens
- Harley & Ivy Meet Betty & Veronica
- Blossoms 666
- Ouija board
- Robert (doll)
