= Riverdale season 4 =

2019–2020 television series season

Riverdale
- Season 4
- DVD cover
- Starring: KJ Apa; Lili Reinhart; Camila Mendes; Cole Sprouse; Marisol Nichols; Madelaine Petsch; Ashleigh Murray; Mark Consuelos; Casey Cott; Charles Melton; Vanessa Morgan; Skeet Ulrich; Mädchen Amick
- No. of episodes: 19

Release
- Original network: The CW
- Original release: October 9, 2019 – May 6, 2020

Season chronology
- ← Previous; Season 3 Next → Season 5

The fourth season of Riverdale premiered on The CW on October 9, 2019, and concluded on May 6, 2020, with a total of 19 episodes. The series was based on the characters from the Archie Comics, created by Maurice Coyne, Louis Silberkleit, and John L. Goldwater, and was created by Roberto Aguirre-Sacasa.

The principal cast included KJ Apa, Lili Reinhart, Camila Mendes, Cole Sprouse, Marisol Nichols, Madelaine Petsch, Mädchen Amick, Mark Consuelos, Casey Cott, Skeet Ulrich, Charles Melton and Vanessa Morgan returning from the previous season. Ashleigh Murray, who portrayed Josie McCoy on the previous seasons, exited the main cast after the first episode of the season, as she was cast in a leading role on the Riverdale spin-off series Katy Keene.

This was the first season of the series not to feature Luke Perry, who died on March 4, 2019, weeks before the completion of the third season. The season premiere was a tribute dedicated to him and his character on the show, Fred Andrews.

The season continued to develop the previous season cliffhanger, detailing Jughead's apparent murder and Archie, Betty and Veronica's involvement in it, while also focusing on the mysteries surrounding Jughead's new school and classmates. As well, the season focused on The Voyeur/Auteur, an anonymous person who has been videotaping some of Riverdale's residences, and then evolves to re-enact the gruesome murders of some of the town's deceased residents in video, while wearing masks crafted to their likeness.

== Episodes ==
No. overall	No. in season	Title	Directed by	Written by	Original release date	Prod. code	U.S. viewers (millions)
58	1	"Chapter Fifty-Eight: In Memoriam"	Gabriel Correa	Roberto Aguirre-Sacasa	October 9, 2019	T13.21851	1.14
As Riverdale prepares for the first Independence Day parade since Jason Blossom's death, Archie learns that his father has been killed by a hit-and-run driver in the town of Cherry Creek. The funeral home notifies Archie and his mom that they'll be unable to transport Fred's body home until after the holiday, which Archie finds unsettling. So, he asks Veronica, Betty, and Jughead to come with him to bring his dad home. While retrieving Fred's truck, the gang meets a woman (Shannen Doherty) and learns that Fred died saving her life by pushing her out of the way of the speeding car that killed him. They share a prayer and leave flowers at the edge of the road. F.P. calls Archie to inform him that the man responsible for his father's death has turned himself in. Archie abandons the others and runs to the man's home. He learns that the man was protecting his own son by taking the blame for the accident and forgives the man and his son. Arriving back in Riverdale, the friends are greeted by the residents of Riverdale holding signs in Fred's honor. Fred's funeral takes place and Archie and his friends set off fireworks in his backyard in remembrance of his father.
59	2	"Chapter Fifty-Nine: Fast Times at Riverdale High"	Pamela Romanowsky	Michael Grassi & Will Ewing	October 16, 2019	T13.21852	0.80
On the first day of senior year, the gang encounters some surprises. Veronica struggles with the paparazzi, Betty deals with trusting Kevin after his affiliation with the Farm, and Jughead is offered a position at the prestigious Stonewall Prep, which he declines. Meanwhile, the school's new principal, Mr. Honey, cancels the dance due to the murders that occurred at the junior prom. Upset, Cheryl throws a party at Thistle House instead. Mad Dog (now going by his legal name, Munroe Moore) joins the Bulldogs and Reggie, feeling inferior, lashes out at him. Betty learns that Kevin is still talking to Fangs, who is feeding him information about the Farm and how Kevin can prove his loyalty. Learning that Kevin is still brainwashed, Betty and Charles help him recover, which actually allows Kevin to trick Fangs into telling him where the Farm has been relocated. Archie witnesses Reggie's father's abuse towards Reggie—which causes him to speak out to Mr. Mantle. Reggie and Archie then decide to break Mr. Mantle's car for payback for the abuse he has inflicted on Reggie. Betty encourages Jughead to go to Stonewall Prep; and when he obliges, F.P. speaks on his pride for Jughead's acceptance to the school. An ominous closing flash-forward shows a desperate search party looking for Jughead during Spring Break.
60	3	"Chapter Sixty: Dog Day Afternoon"	Gregory Smith	Ace Hasan & Greg Murray	October 23, 2019	T13.21853	0.87
As Jughead settles in at Stonewall Prep, he develops a hostile relationship with his roommate, Bret. Jughead also reconciles with Moose, who is another roommate of his, now going by "Marmaduke". Cheryl deals with having to conceal Jason's body when Toni hires a live-in assistant to help Nana Rose. When Cheryl is talking with Jason in the basement, Toni stumbles upon them. Archie wrestles with coming up with $40,000 to help renovate the gym so it can be turned into a community center. Veronica pulls together some money to help him, while in the process of changing her name to ditch the Lodge label. Betty and Charles work on safely retrieving the members of the Farm. Edgar asks for money, food, passports, and a bus. Charles refuses, but Betty manages to acquire the items herself, and infiltrates the motel where the cult has relocated. While there, Evelyn knocks Betty unconscious. Betty later wakes up tied to a chair next to Alice in a motel room, and they escape—knocking Evelyn unconscious. Alice follows Edgar to the roof of the motel, where he "ascends" after Alice fatally shoots him. At home, Betty and Jughead are met with a ring of the doorbell, to reveal a videotape at the doorstep.
61	4	"Chapter Sixty-One: Halloween"	Erin Feeley	Janine Salinas Schoenberg	October 30, 2019	T13.21854	0.74
On the eve of Halloween, Riverdale families receive videotapes of their houses being watched. As Halloween approaches, Cheryl and Toni re-bury Jason's body, but Cheryl is worried that Jason's ghost will now haunt Thistlehouse. After a seance in the Blossom chapel, Nana Rose reveals that Cheryl was supposed to have a second brother named Julian, but she absorbed him before birth. Meanwhile, at Stonewall Prep, Jughead's classmates haze him and lock him inside a coffin in Mr. Chipping's office for Halloween night. Elsewhere, Archie and Munroe throw a Halloween party for the kids of the community in order to keep Dodger away, but the party ends in Dodger shooting one of the kids who attended the party. Veronica wards off an escaped patient from Shady Grove, as he poses as another man and tries to murder her. Betty and Jellybean, while home alone, receive phone calls by someone claiming to be the Black Hood. When Charles tracks the phone calls, Betty learns that they are coming from Polly. Later, it's revealed Charles is secretly listening to Betty's calls. An ominous closing flash-forward shows F.P. and Betty at the coroner's office identifying what appears to be Jughead's dead body.
62	5	"Chapter Sixty-Two: Witness for the Prosecution"	Harry Jierjian	Devon Turner	November 6, 2019	T13.21855	0.76
The trials of Hermione and Hiram begin, and Veronica is working hardest on proving her mother's innocence. When some revelations come to the surface, Veronica is forced to have her mother plead guilty to her crimes and bribe the governor to pardon her. Veronica meets her sister, Hermosa, who has helped Hiram get released—much to her dismay. At Hiram's release, he says he will be running for mayor. Meanwhile, Archie and Munroe continue to ward off Dodger from the community center. Elsewhere, Betty and Kevin join the Junior FBI Training Program where Betty is incredibly successful. Betty is also haunted by her past when it is confirmed that she has the "serial killer genes". Jughead, while at Stonewall Prep, learns more about the Baxter Brothers novels that he loved when he was a kid, and enters a contest to become the next ghost writer for the series. A flash forward reveals Archie, Veronica, and Betty being arrested in biology class for the murder of Jughead.
63	6	"Chapter Sixty-Three: Hereditary"	Gabriel Correa	James DeWille	November 13, 2019	T13.21856	0.82
Archie continues to get kids off the streets, despite Dodger's threats. With Veronica's parents out of jail, she wants nothing to do with Hermosa and Hiram. Hiram and Hermione sleep together, leading them to renew their vows, which Veronica is reluctant to attend. Jughead finds proof that his grandfather wrote the first Baxter Brothers book, which the original writer denies. After asking for Mr. Chipping's help with the investigation, Mr. Chipping apologizes to Jughead and dives out of a window in his office. Cheryl and Toni try to expel Julian's spirit from Thistlehouse with an interruption from Cheryl's Aunt Cricket and Uncle Bedford who want her to sign away the family business. Later, Uncle Bedford gains access to the chapel to find Jason's body, and declares Cheryl sick and pins her against the wall. Toni then kills him with a candlestick. Betty deals with proving Charles's trust to her family. She visits Chic, and Chic lies and tells her that Charles killed someone. Chic tells the authorities that Alice murdered a man, leading F.P. and Charles to remove any proof, proving his trust to Betty. Charles visits Chic, and it becomes clear that they are lovers and are working on the demise of the Cooper family.
64	7	"Chapter Sixty-Four: The Ice Storm"	Alex Pillai	Arabella Anderson	November 20, 2019	T13.21857	0.74
Betty and Jughead look into Mr. Chipping's death while staying on Stonewall Prep's campus during an ice storm. With Thanksgiving on the way, Archie and Veronica make plans to host a Thanksgiving dinner at the community center, which Hiram derails as the new mayor of Riverdale. While preparing for the Thanksgiving dinner, Dodger's family preys on the community center to kill Archie for revenge, believing that he had hurt Dodger. Things escalate quickly, but just as Archie is about to be killed, an explosion occurs with the deep fryer, prompting Mary to grab the gun and order them to leave. Alice and F.P. decide that they want to have turkey dinner at Pop's for Thanksgiving and are joined by Hiram and Hermione, which ends in an altercation between Hiram and F.P. in La Bonne Nuit. While Cheryl and Toni are trying to cover up Bedford's murder, Cheryl's Aunt Cricket will not stop stalking them. They invite her over to dinner and lead her to believe that the meat she is eating is Bedford's body, when really it was just a distraction so they could dump Bedford's body in Sweetwater River before it froze over. Archie dedicates the community center to Fred's legacy while the town watches.
65	8	"Chapter Sixty-Five: In Treatment"	Michael Goi	Tessa Leigh Williams	December 4, 2019	T13.21858	0.69
More videotapes appear at Riverdale doorsteps. Betty learns that she did not get into Yale and Alice claims it is because of her sexual activity. During a session with Ms. Burble, the guidance counselor, Betty and her mother argue and Alice reveals that Betty is her favorite child. Archie and Ms. Burble discuss Archie's business as a vigilante, and she urges him to take discretion. Archie then decides to move out, so his mother is no longer in danger. Cheryl loses the leadership of the Vixens due to her delicate mental state. After meeting with Ms. Burble, they discuss how Cheryl can find better outlets to deal with her trauma and that Julian's ghost has not truly been haunting Thistlehouse. Veronica receives an acceptance to Harvard but learns that Hiram had influence in the acceptance. Ms. Burble advises her to no longer associate with Hiram. Jughead is advised to receive recommendations from Riverdale staff to better supplement his applications. Betty and Jughead deduce the murders disguised as suicides all happened to members of the secret society that Mr. Chipping was part of. A flashforward shows Archie, Betty, and Veronica being taken into custody at the police station for Jughead's murder.
66	9	"Chapter Sixty-Six: Tangerine"	Gabriel Correa	Brian E. Paterson	December 11, 2019	T13.21859	0.73
After receiving a phone call, Polly attacks a Shady Grove nurse. Alice attempts to stab Betty with a knife, also after receiving a phone call. Betty learns that Evelyn had been making calls using a trigger word to initiate attacks on Dark Betty. FP is shot by Dodger at Pop's, and Archie fights Dodger in an alley, despite the family being in the process of fleeing. Archie then meets his uncle. Veronica invites her Abuelita to town to tell her how her father's been treating her and to get the family rum recipe, although Hiram claims to have patented it. Jughead is awarded the Baxter Brothers contract, which causes him to track down his grandfather. His grandfather tells him that Dupont legally took over writing the book after he left Stonewall Prep. Jughead goes back later to find that his grandfather is gone. He is inducted into the Quill & Skull Society. Cheryl lures Penelope out of the walls of Thistlehouse where she has been staying. She then banishes Penelope to Dilton's bunker and decides to give Jason a final farewell by way of a Norse funeral on Sweetwater River. A flash forward is then shown indicating that Betty had killed Jughead with a rock.
67	10	"Chapter Sixty-Seven: Varsity Blues"	Roxanne Benjamin	Aaron Allen	January 22, 2020	T13.21860	0.79
The Riverdale Bulldogs make it to the state finals against the Stonewall Stallions, who have been reported to play unfairly. Betty attempts to find the truth. The Vixens receive a new cheer coach Mrs. Appleyard, much to Cheryl's dismay. Veronica continues to pursue her rum-making endeavors until her father comes after her for copying his recipe. Archie learns that his uncle Frank has a troubled past, and Jughead gets in deeper with the Quill & Skull Society after discovering that he has earned an interview with Yale. Tension builds up between Riverdale High and Stonewall Prep before game day, as after Munroe is attacked outside the community center, Archie and the Bulldogs get into a fight with Stonewall's team. On game day, Frank gives Munroe drugs so that he can play and Cheryl locks Appleyard in a classroom so she can have the squad to herself. The Stonewall Stallions won, prompting Betty to form a quiz team so that Riverdale High still has a chance to get an edge over Stonewall Prep in something. Jughead is accepted to Yale and a flash-forward shows Betty packing up Jughead's dorm room with Bret telling her that she "got what she wanted." Without being a crossover, this episode features a cameo appearance by Ty Wood as Billy Marlin, a character from Chilling Adventures of Sabrina.
68	11	"Chapter Sixty-Eight: Quiz Show"	Chell Stephen	Ted Sullivan	January 29, 2020	T13.21861	0.73
Betty, Veronica, Cheryl, and Toni win in the Quiz Show semifinals and earn a spot in the finals against Stonewall Prep. Jughead and Bret tell Betty that they got into Yale, and Betty learns out that Bret's father bought his way in. Cheryl and Veronica turn the speakeasy into a club in to cover up serving rum. Hiram finds them and they must relocate. Cheryl and Veronica decide to set up in the Maple Club. They make a deal with Penelope to keep watch on the Maple Club. Archie lands in hot water with Tom as Frank takes over Andrews construction and makes risky moves. Kevin earns money by making videos where he is tickled by men. Charles tells Betty that the reason she was denied to Yale was because she was the daughter of the Black Hood. Betty smashes Hal's gravestone. At the Quiz Finals, the Yale recruiter says Betty is in if Riverdale wins against Stonewall Prep. Alice leaves Betty the answers, but Betty tears them up. Bret plants the evidence in Betty's room, which leads Alice to be suspended from work and Betty to be suspended from school. A flash-forward then reveals Archie comforting Betty in a booth at Pop's as she mourns the loss of Jughead.
69	12	"Chapter Sixty-Nine: Men of Honor"	Catriona McKenzie	Ariana Jackson	February 5, 2020	T13.21862	0.65
Betty decides to spend suspension time with Alice to look more into Mr. Chipping's murder. They meet with Mr. Chipping's wife, who says Donna was lying about the affair she had with him, and Moose, who says that Bret videotaped him having sex. Betty and Alice go to find Bret's videotapes while he is preoccupied with Jughead and the duel, but he finds them. Archie meets Frank's friend from the Army, who turns out to be a mercenary out for blood. F.P. locks him up, but he escapes and attacks Archie at school. Frank was also a mercenary, so he is forced to leave town before capture. Veronica catches up with her friend Katy Keene in New York, and after she returns learns that her father is ill. Nick St. Clair appears, and Toni, Kevin, and Fangs turn the tables on him, forcing him to leave Riverdale from Cheryl. Jughead gives Bret the win in their duel, and Betty reveals that she was able to sneak a tape labeled "Donna" from Stonewall Prep. The tape shows Donna giving the same speech she gave to Betty about her affair with Mr. Chipping, only this time she is incriminating a man who does not exist, pushing Betty to investigate Donna. Note: This episode is a crossover with Katy Keene.
70	13	"Chapter Seventy: The Ides of March"	Claudia Yarmy	Chrissy Maroon & Evan Kyle	February 12, 2020	T13.21863	0.65
Jughead learns that his Baxter Brothers contract is being terminated and he has been removed from the Quill & Skull Society. Archie tries to make decisions about his future, which includes almost selling Andrews Construction. Veronica struggles with Hiram's diseased state. Cheryl and Toni discover Hermosa in disguise trying to gain knowledge on Cheryl and Veronica's business. Jughead is accused of plagiarizing the story that got him into Yale. He plans to fight these accusations until Bret informs Jughead that he must accept his punishment and leave Stonewall Prep or he will release a video of him and Betty having sex. Bret still invites him and Betty into the woods for a party to celebrate the Ides of March. Betty invites Veronica and Archie so they can all spend some time together. Jughead goes to the party seeking revenge on Bret, luring him into the woods. Betty follows Donna into the woods, where Donna reveals that she met with Evelyn in prison and Evelyn revealed to Donna that there is a special word that will hypnotize Betty into hurting people she loves. Donna and Bret are then seen walking out of the woods, with Archie and Veronica stumbling upon Betty, who has bludgeoned Jughead to a death with a rock.
71	14	"Chapter Seventy-One: How to Get Away with Murder"	James DeWille	Arabella Anderson	February 26, 2020	T13.21864	0.67
After Jughead's death, Betty, Archie, and Veronica burn his beanie and their clothes in the woods. When arriving home late that night, they all provide different explanations to their parents. Meanwhile, Betty decides to plant a bug at Stonewall Prep to determine the events of the night Jughead died because she doesn't remember anything after her conversation with Donna in the woods. However, it is soon found by Bret and Donna and destroyed. Back in Riverdale, Alice and F.P. discover Jughead's cellphone is in Betty's jacket, having been planted by Joan. While continuing the investigation, F.P. takes a bloody rock into evidence which is replaced by Charles with a decoy with fake blood. Charles helps Betty come to terms with what happened the night of the murder. She remembers that Donna blew a powder in her face called "devil's breath", which would've made her incapable of murdering Jughead. This means that the Stonewall kids murdered Jughead and planted the evidence on her. Jughead's body is found when a search party goes out for him, and Betty and F.P. identify it at the morgue. After, Betty, Archie, and Veronica go back to Pop's to discuss their next moves.
72	15	"Chapter Seventy-Two: To Die For"	Shannon Kohli	Roberto Aguirre-Sacasa	March 4, 2020	T13.21865	0.66
Alice begins to make a documentary about Jughead's alleged death as investigation is under way. At Stonewall Prep, F.P. is in Donna's room looking for evidence for the case when Donna tells him that the Core Three killed Jughead. F.P. then goes to Riverdale High and arrests them but lets them go when the test results on the rock reveal that the blood was fake. Betty plans a funeral for Jughead and Donna, Bret, and Joan attend. Donna, believing that Jughead is alive, orders Bret to open the casket, which gets them kicked out. Donna, believing that they are being fooled decides to dig a little deeper into the death of Jughead. At school, Cheryl creates a locker memorial for Jughead which makes Betty emotional. She runs to the music room, followed by Archie and they kiss. Cheryl tells Veronica; who angrily confronts them in the lounge. Donna follows Betty into Dilton's bunker that night to find her and Archie kissing. Knowing that Donna was following her, she hid a very alive Jughead under the cot as a diversion so Bret and Donna would crack under pressure. At home, Betty and Archie flirtatiously text and Hermosa finds evidence about Donna's identity to help take-down the Stonewall kids.
73	16	"Chapter Seventy-Three: The Locked Room"	Tessa Blake	Aaron Allen	March 11, 2020	T13.21866	0.66
Jughead and Betty hold a locked room with the Stonewall kids and Mr. DuPont, explaining all. Mr. Chipping killed himself out of guilt as he orchestrated the perfect murder to earn the Baxter Brothers contract. Whoever was assigned the ghostwriter job, would write and conduct a perfect murder. Moose was supposed to be the murdered student, before Mr. Chipping urged him to leave town. Betty and Jughead deduce that all four students had a hand in the plot to kill Jughead. Charles ordered the trio to burn their clothes and all evidence while he took Jughead in for injuries. Betty brings in Charles, FP, and Forsythe. Forsythe has been living in hiding, trying to prove Mr. DuPont murdered his original literary circle. Jughead was bait to lure out Forsythe so Mr. DuPont could finish the murder. DuPont kills himself to avoid jail, and Joan leaves the country. Bret reveals the location of the tapes, while he faces charges. Betty blackmails Donna into disappearing, figuring out Donna's grandmother was murdered by DuPont, making her the mastermind behind everything. Betty starts to realize she might have feelings for Archie. FP and Forsythe begin talking. Veronica and Betty promise to tutor the guys so they can all graduate together.
74	17	"Chapter Seventy-Four: Wicked Little Town"	Antonio Negret	Tessa Leigh Williams	April 15, 2020	T13.21867	0.54
Kevin attempts to perform a song from the musical Hedwig and the Angry Inch at the school's Variety Show, but Mr. Honey refuses, believing the show to be too inappropriate. Archie signs up himself, Jughead, Betty, and Veronica to play as a band, "The Archies," in the show, while Cheryl and Toni attempt to get Mr. Honey to allow the musical to be part of the show, but their actions instead cause him to cancel the show entirely. Archie notices Hiram struggling with lifting weights at the gym because of his disease. After he collapses, Archie tells Veronica, who is angry with him for not doing anything about it. Meanwhile, Betty tutors Jughead following his return to Riverdale High, but he instead investigates more videotapes presumably sent by the same person, and is angry with her for not taking the threat seriously. Rejected by their partners, Archie and Betty kiss while rehearsing a song. Veronica and Jughead later apologize, but Archie and Betty appear to have lingering feelings. Jughead later views a tape where someone disguised as him is murdered by someone disguised as Betty.
75	18	"Chapter Seventy-Five: Lynchian"	Steven A. Adelson	Ariana Jackson & Brian E. Paterson	April 29, 2020	T13.21868	0.66
Charles, investigating the videotapes, learns that a video store has a video of Clifford killing Jason. Kevin brings Toni, Fangs, and Reggie into the tickle videos to earn some cash; they decide to start their own website. Afterwards, Kevin is threatened by Terry who demands a share of his profits. Betty reminisces about her relationship with Archie as a child and their long and complicated love story. Archie is conflicted over his feelings about Betty while working on a song for her. Cheryl and Veronica's rum business is attacked by Jinx Malloy's clan, who then Hiram threatens. In return, Hunter Malloy severely beats him. Reggie and the Bulldogs threaten Terry so they can continue making videos. After Cheryl quits the business, Veronica partners with Hiram, feeling he has changed. However, Hiram murders Jinx, the head of the gang. Mr. Honey, a secret visitor to the store, finds out about the tickling website and demands that it be shut down. Archie wants to act on his feelings for Betty, but she tells him she will not hurt anyone, so they decide not to. In return, Archie plans to leave for the Naval Academy. Cheryl receives a videotape, this time with someone wearing a Clifford mask murdering someone in a Jason mask.
76	19	"Chapter Seventy-Six: Killing Mr. Honey"	Mädchen Amick	Ted Sullivan & James DeWille	May 6, 2020	T13.21869	0.65
When Mr. Honey threatens to cancel prom, the gang is frustrated. Jughead must write a story for the University of Iowa, so he writes a tale about the group killing Honey for ruining their senior year. In this story, Archie, Veronica, Betty, Jughead, Reggie, and Cheryl murder Honey and later begin to give into darkness inside of them when covering up the murder. When the school receives a suspicious tape, Honey believes there is danger and cancels prom. In Jughead's story, Reggie dies in a car accident and foul play is suspected. Betty watches the full tape and catches a reflection of Honey in it. Filming the tape as an excuse to cancel prom, Charles and Betty have him fired and prom reinstated. Ms. Bell tells the gang that Honey was good for the school and gives Jughead his letter of recommendation for college. Jughead, moved, changes his story so Veronica and Archie are taking Honey to the hospital and saving his life; not wanting to become evil. Betty and Jughead are left another videotape inviting them to a cabin. They find another videotape, this time with a group of people wearing masks of the gang who stab Mr. Honey to death.

== Cast and characters ==
=== Main ===
- KJ Apa as Archie Andrews, the main protagonist of the series, Veronica's boyfriend, Jughead and Betty's best friend, a high school football player and boxer who is also the owner of the El Royale Gym.
- Lili Reinhart as Betty Cooper, Veronica and Archie's best friend, Jughead's girlfriend and a former member of the Farm.
- Camila Mendes as Veronica Lodge, Archie's girlfriend, Betty and Jughead's girlfriend and the owner of La Bonne Nuit who faces off against Hermosa this season.
- Cole Sprouse as Jughead Jones, Betty's boyfriend and the leader of the Southside Serpents who goes to Stonewall Prep for his writing skills.
- Marisol Nichols as Hermione Lodge, Veronica's mother, Hiram's ex-wife and the co-owner of Lodge Industries who is also now the hostess for La Bonne Nuit.
- Madelaine Petsch as Cheryl Blossom, the leader of the cheerleading squad the River Vixens, Toni's girlfriend and member of the Blossom family who is haunted by her past.
- Ashleigh Murray as Josie McCoy, a singer, leader of the Pussycats and Sierra's daughter who was also Archie's former love interest. (Note: Murray is only credited as a main cast member in 4x01. Starting with 4x02, she is no longer credited as a main cast member.)
- Mark Consuelos as Hiram Lodge, Veronica and Hermosa's father, Hermione's ex-husband, a drug dealer, gangster and the owner of Lodge Industries who manages to escape prison after being put there at the end of last season.
- Casey Cott as Kevin Keller, Riverdale's resident gay student, Fangs's boyfriend and a former member of the RROTC Cadets and the Farm.
- Charles Melton as Reggie Mantle, the Captain of the Riverdale Bulldogs, Archie's frenemy, Veronica's former boyfriend and a worker at La Bonne Nuit who squares off against Mr. Honey and is jealous of Mad Dog.
- Vanessa Morgan as Toni Topaz, Cheryl's girlfriend, a former member of the Southside Serpents and the leader of the Pretty Poisons.
- Skeet Ulrich as FP Jones, Jughead, Charles and Jellybean's father, Gladys's ex-husband, Forsythe's son, Alice's boyfriend and the former leader of the Southside Serpents who is also the Sheriff of Riverdale.
- Mädchen Amick as Alice Cooper, Betty, Polly and Charles's mother, the deceased Hal's ex-wife, FP's girlfriend and a former member of the Farm who is revealed to be an FBI informant secretly helping get rid of Edgar Evernever.

=== Recurring ===
- Molly Ringwald as Mary Andrews, Archie's mother, the deceased Fred's widowed wife and a Chicago lawyer who returns to Riverdale for her husband's funeral and raises Archie all by herself.
- Nathalie Boltt as Penelope Blossom, Cheryl's mother and Nana Rose's daughter-in-law who tries to get revenge on her daughter.
- Martin Cummins as Tom Keller, the former Sheriff of Riverdale and Kevin's father.
- Zoé de Grand'Maison as Evelyn Evernever, Edgar's wife posing as his daughter who tries to continue the farm.
- Eli Goree as Munroe Moore, Archie's best friend and sparring partner at the El Royale Gym who faces off against Reggie.
- Cody Kearsley as Moose Mason, a bisexual former student of Riverdale High and Kevin's former boyfriend who is now a student of Stonewall Prep.
- Kerr Smith as Holden Honey, the new strict and controlling Riverdale High principal replacing Waldo Weatherbee who tries to "discipline" the students.
- Wyatt Nash as Charles Smith, Betty and Polly's illegitimate older brother, Alice and FP's illegitimate son, Chic's former boyfriend and an FBI Agent trying to uncover the mysterious tapes and mystery at Stonewall Prep.
- Mishel Prada as Hermosa Lodge, Veronica's secret and estranged older half-sister, Hiram's illegitimate daughter and a private investigator from Miami who comes to Riverdale to help her father.
- Ryan Robbins as Frank Andrews, Fred's younger brother, Mary's brother-in-law and Archie's paternal uncle who comes to Riverdale to help Mary raise Archie.
- Malcolm Stewart as Francis DuPont, the principal and founder of Stonewall Prep and the creator of the Baxter Brothers franchise who may have stolen the idea from Jughead's paternal grandfather.
- Juan Riedinger as Dodger Dickenson, a small-time thief in Riverdale and Darla's son who faces off against Archie.
- Tiera Skovbye as Polly Cooper, Betty's older sister, Juniper and Dagwood's mother and Alice and the deceased Hal's daughter who tries to get rid of the Farm.
- Sam Witwer as Rupert Chipping, an English teacher at Stonewall Prep who tries to help Jughead.
- Alex Barima as Jonathan, a student at Stonewall Prep and a member of the Quill and Skulls Club.
- Sean Depner as Bret Weston Wallis, a student at Stonewall Prep, Donna's assistant, a member of the Quill and Skulls Club and leader of the Stonewall Stallions who faces off against the Riverdale High students.
- Sarah Desjardins as Donna Sweett, a student at Stonewall Prep and Brett's master.
- Trinity Likins as Jellybean Jones, Jughead's younger sister, FP and Gladys's daughter and a student at Riverdale High.
- Ajay Friese as Eddie, a boy recruited by Archie to help with the El Royale Gym.
- Doralynn Mui as Joan Berkeley, a student of Stonewall Prep and member of the Quill and Skulls Club.
- Drew Ray Tanner as Fangs Fogarty, a bisexual student of Riverdale High, Kevin's boyfriend and a member of the Southside Serpents.
- Jordan Robinson as Toby, a boy from the Northside streets recruited by Archie to help with the El Royale Gym.
- Alvin Sanders as Pop Tate, the kindly and aging owner of Pop's Chocke-Litte Shoppe.
- Barbara Wallace as Rose Blossom, Cheryl and the deceased Jason's paternal grandmother, the deceased Clifford and Claudius's mother, Penelope's mother-in-law and one of Riverdale's oldest residents.
- Marion Eisman as Doris Bell, an aging secretary for principals at Riverdale High.
- Marlon Kazadi as Malcolm Moore, Munroe Moore/Mad Dog's younger brother who helps Archie with the El Royale Gym.
- Trevor Stines as Jason Blossom, Cheryl's deceased brother, Nana Rose's grandson and Penelope's son whose dead body is used by Cheryl.

=== Guest ===
- Robin Givens as Sierra McCoy, Josie's mother and the former Mayor of Riverdale, now a defense attorney.
- Barclay Hope as Clifford Blossom, Cheryl's deceased father, Nana Rose's son and Penelope's husband who appears in flashbacks.
- Lochlyn Munro as Hal Cooper, Betty and Polly's deceased father, the serial killer the Black Hood, the former owner of The Register and Alice's ex-husband who appears in flashbacks.
- Shannen Doherty as Stranded Motorist, a woman who knew Fred Andrews.
- Bernadette Beck as Peaches 'N Cream, a member of the Pretty Poisons and an acquaintance of Toni and Cheryl.
- Tom McBeath as Smithers, The Lodge family's butler at the Pembrooke
- Moses Thiessen as Ben Button, a deceased pizza boy who appears in flashbacks.
- Chad Michael Murray as Edgar Evernever, Evelyn's husband posing as her father and the leader of the Farm.
- Nikolai Witschl as Dr. Curdle Jr., Dr Curdle Sr's son and a morgue attendant
- Azura Skye as Darla Dickenson, a small-time Northside thief and Dodger's mother seeking revenge on the main characters.
- Timothy Webber as Forsythe Pendleton Jones I, Jughead and Jellybean's paternal grandfather, Gladys's father-in-law, FP's father and the former leader of the Southside Serpents who was also a student at Stonewall Prep as a teenager and may have been the real creator of Baxter Brothers.
- Emily Tennant as Ms. Appleyard, a teacher at Riverdale High
- Ty Wood as Billy Marlin, a jock from Greendale. (He previously appeared in Chilling Adventures of Sabrina)
- Lucy Hale as Katy Keene, a New York socialite and Veronica's estranged best friend who reunites with her when she visits New York.
- Graham Phillips as Nick St. Clair, Simone and Xander's son and a former friend of Veronica's who tried to rape a drugged Cheryl formerly and now returns to Riverdale.
- Spencer Lord as Terry, a young boy helping Archie with the El Royale Gym.
- Luvia Petersen as Brooke Rivers, an army recruiter and Mary's estranged best friend who was also formerly her girlfriend.
- Matthew Yang King as Marty Mantle, Reggie's abusive father and the owner of Jamboree Luxury Cars and Mantle's Used Car Lot who finally stops abusing his son.
- Jordan Connor as Sweet Pea, a member of the Southside Serpents and Fangs's best friend
- Shannon Purser as Ethel Muggs, a depressed student at Riverdale High who was formerly in the Sisters of Quiet Mercy and the Farm.
- Kett Turton as David, an acquaintance of Hiram Lodge.
- Steve Makaj as Jinx Malloy, the owner of the Maple business who faces off against Archie and Hiram.
- Billy Wickman as Hunter Malloy, Jinx's son and a worker at the Maple business facing off against Archie and Hiram.
- Peter Bryant as Waldo Weatherbee, the former principal of Riverdale High and now a member of the Farm.
- Hart Denton as Chic, a former hustler and Charles's former boyfriend who is now a prison inmate.
- Gina Torres as Mrs. Burble, a psychologist brought in by Mr. Honey who tries to psycho-analyze the main characters.

== Production ==
=== Development ===
On January 31, 2019, The CW renewed the show for a fourth season. Filming for the season began on July 8, 2019, and was initially scheduled to end on April 4, 2020. On June 19, 2019, it was announced the season premiere would serve as a tribute to actor Luke Perry and his character Fred Andrews; the series' writing team opted to wait until early in season four to directly address the absence of Fred, who had been "away on business" during the final episodes of season three. On July 25, 2019, it was announced the season would include the first Halloween-themed episode of the series.

=== Casting ===
On February 5, 2019, Ashleigh Murray was cast in the Riverdale's spin-off series, Katy Keene, and when the show was picked up by The CW for the 2019-20 season, Murray was announced to be leaving the main cast of Riverdale. However, she made a final regular appearance on the first episode of the season and hoped for some crossover appearances between both shows. On May 15, 2019, it was announced the return of Wyatt Nash, who played Charles Smith (Betty's half-brother) at the third-season finale, would return during the season as a recurring character. On July 22, 2019, it was announced Shannen Doherty would appear during the tribute episode to Luke Perry as a guest star. Doherty was a long-time friend and co-star with Perry on Beverly Hills, 90210. On July 30, 2019, it was announced that Sam Witwer had joined the cast playing the recurring character of Mr. Chipping, Jughead's teacher. Juan Riedinger join the cast as Dodger, Archie's next new enemy, on August 19, 2019. On September 5, 2019, Mishel Prada joined the cast as Hermosa Lodge, a private investigator and half-sister to Veronica. On October 21, 2019, it was announced Ryan Robbins and Timothy Webber would join the recurring cast playing Frank Andrews, Fred's young brother and Archie's uncle, and Forsythe Pendleton Jones I, F.P.'s father and Jughead's grandfather respectively. On February 24, 2020, TVLine confirmed costars Skeet Ulrich and Marisol Nichols, who played F.P. Jones and Hermione Lodge, respectively, were leaving the show after the conclusion of the fourth season. However, after the COVID-19 pandemic halted production of season four, both stars were announced to return to film the original final episodes of the season, which were ultimately moved to the beginning of season five. Additionally, Marisol Nichols announced on June 12, 2020, that she would be staying in the show for season five after all.

=== Impact of the COVID-19 pandemic ===
On March 11, 2020, production of the season was shut down indefinitely after a member of the cast or crew came in contact with an individual who tested positive for COVID-19. Up to that point, the season had produced only 19 out of the 22 originally announced episodes and was in the middle of shooting of the twentieth episode. As a result, the show went on a hiatus following the premiere of the sixteenth episode on March 11, 2020, and returned with the seventeenth episode on April 15, 2020, which was delayed a week of its original premiere date. It was announced on April 23, 2020, that production for the season would not resume and instead, the season would end on May 6, 2020, with its nineteenth episode, 3 episodes earlier than expected. The 3 remaining episodes of this season were later moved to the beginning of season five.

== Music ==
Riverdale: Season 4 (Original Television Soundtrack) track listing
No.	Title	Artist(s)	Length
1.	"Amazing Grace"	Ashleigh Murray	3:23
2.	"All That Jazz"	Camila Mendes	3:21
3.	"Saturday Night's Alright (For Fightning)"	Camila Mendes, Casey Cott	2:26
4.	"Cherry Bomb"	Camila Mendes, Madelaine Petsch, Vanessa Morgan	1:56
5.	"Carry The Torch"	KJ Apa	1:50

Riverdale: Season 4 (Score from the Original Television Soundtrack)
No.	Title	Artist(s)	Length
1.	"Dad Is Gone"	Blake Neely and Sherri Chung	5:55
2.	"Bringing Fred Home"	Blake Neely and Sherri Chung	4:21
3.	"Fast Times at Riverdale High"	Blake Neely and Sherri Chung	5:27
4.	"Dog Day Afternoon"	Blake Neely and Sherri Chung	5:30
5.	"Hereditary, Riverdale Style"	Blake Neely and Sherri Chung	5:12
6.	"New Conspiracy Theory"	Blake Neely and Sherri Chung	4:56
7.	"The Ice Storm"	Blake Neely and Sherri Chung	4:32
8.	"In Treatment"	Blake Neely and Sherri Chung	6:25
9.	"Quill and Scroll"	Blake Neely and Sherri Chung	6:07
10.	"The Ides of March"	Blake Neely and Sherri Chung	4:56
11.	"This Is Nice"	Blake Neely and Sherri Chung	4:56
12.	"Into the Lion Den"	Blake Neely and Sherri Chung	4:38
13.	"The Death of Jughead Jones"	Blake Neely and Sherri Chung	4:37
14.	"Jughead Funeral / Betty Threat"	Blake Neely and Sherri Chung	5:21
15.	"Tangerine and Honey"	Blake Neely and Sherri Chung	3:41

== Release ==
The first trailer for the season was released on September 11, 2019. A second trailer was screened at the 2019 New York Comic Con on October 6, 2019 The season premiered on October 9, 2019, and was scheduled to end on mid May 2020 with its 22nd. episode, however, after the COVID-19 pandemic forced production of the season to shut down with only 19 of the episodes being completed, the season ended with its 19th. episode on May 6, 2020. The season was released on Netflix for the United States on May 14, 2020 and for Latin America on October 9, 2020. The season was released on DVD by Warner Archives on September 22, 2020, and it is the first season of the show not to be released on Blu-Ray.

== DVD Release ==
The Complete Fourth Season was officially released on DVD in region 1 on September 22, 2020, by Warner Archives. This season became the first of the series not to be released on Blu-ray.

Riverdale: The Complete Fourth Season
Set Details		Special Features
19 episodes; 4-disc set; English (5.1 Dolby Digital); English SDH subtitles; Runtime: 805 minutes		3 All-New Featurettes: Riverdale: 2019 Comic-Con Panel; Agent Betty Copper; Mystery at Stonewall Prep
Release Dates
Region 1	Region 2	Region 4
September 22, 2020	TBA	October 7, 2020

== Reception ==
=== Critical Response ===
On review aggregator website Rotten Tomatoes, the fourth season holds an approval rating of 84% based on 63 reviews, and an average rating of 6.85/10.

=== Ratings ===
Viewership and ratings per episode of Riverdale season 4
No.	Title	Air date	Rating/share (18–49)	Viewers (millions)	DVR (18–49)	DVR viewers (millions)	Total (18–49)	Total viewers (millions)
1	"Chapter Fifty-Eight: In Memoriam"	October 9, 2019	0.4/2	1.14	0.4	0.85	0.8	1.99
2	"Chapter Fifty-Nine: Fast Times at Riverdale High"	October 16, 2019	0.2/2	0.80	0.4	0.73	0.6	1.53
3	"Chapter Sixty: Dog Day Afternoon"	October 23, 2019	0.3/2	0.87	0.3	0.66	0.6	1.53
4	"Chapter Sixty-One: Halloween"	October 30, 2019	0.2/1	0.74	0.4	0.75	0.6	1.49
5	"Chapter Sixty-Two: Witness for the Prosecution"	November 6, 2019	0.2/1	0.76	0.4	0.73	0.6	1.48
6	"Chapter Sixty-Three: Hereditary"	November 13, 2019	0.3/1	0.82	0.3	0.68	0.6	1.50
7	"Chapter Sixty-Four: The Ice Storm"	November 20, 2019	0.2/1	0.74	0.3	0.63	0.5	1.37
8	"Chapter Sixty-Five: In Treatment"	December 4, 2019	0.2/1	0.69	0.3	0.65	0.5	1.34
9	"Chapter Sixty-Six: Tangerine"	December 11, 2019	0.2/1	0.73	0.3	0.59	0.5	1.32
10	"Chapter Sixty-Seven: Varsity Blues"	January 22, 2020	0.2/1	0.79	0.3	0.60	0.5	1.39
11	"Chapter Sixty-Eight: Quiz Show"	January 29, 2020	0.2/1	0.73	0.3	0.59	0.5	1.32
12	"Chapter Sixty-Nine: Men of Honor"	February 5, 2020	0.2	0.65	0.3	0.64	0.5	1.29
13	"Chapter Seventy: The Ides of March"	February 12, 2020	0.2	0.65	0.2	0.55	0.4	1.20
14	"Chapter Seventy-One: How to Get Away with Murder"	February 26, 2020	0.2	0.67	0.2	0.51	0.4	1.18
15	"Chapter Seventy-Two: To Die For"	March 4, 2020	0.2	0.66	0.2	0.51	0.4	1.17
16	"Chapter Seventy-Three: The Locked Room"	March 11, 2020	0.2	0.66	0.2	0.55	0.4	1.21
17	"Chapter Seventy-Four: Wicked Little Town"	April 15, 2020	0.2	0.54	0.2	0.51	0.4	1.05
18	"Chapter Seventy-Five: Lynchian"	April 29, 2020	0.2	0.66	0.2	0.49	0.4	1.15
19	"Chapter Seventy-Six: Killing Mr. Honey"	May 6, 2020	0.2	0.65	0.2	0.47	0.4	1.12
