= Chapter Seventy-Four: Wicked Little Town =

- Riverdale episode
- Promotional poster
- Episode no.: Season 4 Episode 17
- Directed by: Antonio Negret
- Written by: Tessa Leigh Williams
- Based on: Characters by Archie Comics; Hedwig and the Angry Inch by; Stephen Trask; John Cameron Mitchell
- Production code: T13.21867
- Original air date: April 15, 2020
- Running time: 42 minutes

Episode chronology
← Previous "Chapter Seventy-Three: The Locked Room"	Next → "Chapter Seventy-Five: Lynchian"

"Chapter Seventy-Four: Wicked Little Town" is the seventeenth episode of the fourth season of the American television series Riverdale and the seventy-fourth episode of the series overall. The episode was written by Tessa Leigh Williams, directed by Antonio Negret and choreographed by Heather Laura Gray. It centered around the stage musical Hedwig and the Angry Inch by Stephen Trask and John Cameron Mitchell.

It aired on The CW on April 15, 2020. Originally, the episode was scheduled for April 8, 2020, but was delayed due to the COVID-19 pandemic. According to Nielsen Media Research, it was watched by 0.54 million viewers.

The episode also introduced The Archies, a fictional band featuring Archie Comics's characters, for only the second time in a live action adaptation after the television film Archie: To Riverdale and Back Again in 1990.

It is the third musical episode in the series, after "Chapter Thirty-One: A Night to Remember" (season 2: Carrie: The Musical) and "Chapter Fifty-One: Big Fun" (season 3: Heathers: The Musical). It was later followed by "Chapter Ninety-One: The Return of the Pussycats" (season 5; on Josie and the Pussycats), and "Chapter Ninety-Four: Next to Normal" (season 5; on Next to Normal) and "Chapter One Hundred and Twelve: American Psychos" (season 6; on American Psycho: The Musical).

== Plot ==
Residents of Riverdale receive more videotapes of their houses. The school's Variety Show is coming up. Kevin wants to sing a song from the musical Hedwig and the Angry Inch, but Principal Honey believes the show to be too inappropriate. Archie signs up himself, Jughead, Betty, and Veronica to play as a band, "The Archies." Archie sees Hiram struggle lifting weights at the gym because of his disease, but he brushes off Archie's concerns.

Betty tutors Jughead to get him caught up in his classes so he can graduate at the same time, but he is not taking it seriously and instead investigates the videotapes while she thinks he is studying. Cheryl and Toni devise a plan to try to get Honey to accept the show by having everyone perform songs from Hedwig, but in response he threatens to ban students from Senior Prom. As a peaceful protest, all of the students show up to school dressed up as the character Hedwig. Honey cancels the Variety Show entirely instead of conceding.

Hiram collapses and Archie goes to meet Veronica. He reveals that he suspected Hiram wasn't going to the doctor enough, and Veronica gets angry with him for not telling her or making Hiram go himself. Meanwhile, Betty finds out that Jughead has been watching the videotapes rather than doing homework, and they have a fight. She shows up at rehearsal alone, and Archie and Betty end up kissing.

Later, Veronica and Jughead apologize for their blowups, as Betty and Archie look at each other nervously from their windows. Veronica hosts the Variety Show at Le Bonne Nuit and the Archies perform there.

Watching the tapes, Jughead sees a person tied up wearing a Jughead face mask who is brutally murdered by another person in a Betty face mask.

== Cast and characters ==
=== Starring ===
- KJ Apa as Archie Andrews
- Lili Reinhart as Betty Cooper
- Camila Mendes as Veronica Lodge
- Cole Sprouse as Jughead Jones
- Marisol Nichols as Hermione Lodge
- Madelaine Petsch as Cheryl Blossom
- Mädchen Amick as Alice Cooper
- Mark Consuelos as Hiram Lodge
- Casey Cott as Kevin Keller / Hedwig
- Skeet Ulrich as F.P. Jones
- Charles Melton as Reggie Mantle
- Vanessa Morgan as Toni Topaz

=== Guest starring ===
- Kerr Smith as Principal Holden Honey
- Wyatt Nash as Charles Smith
- Drew Ray Tanner as Fangs Fogarty
- Jordan Connor as Sweet Pea
- Trinity Likins as Jellybean Jones
- Martin Cummins as Tom Keller
- Alvin Sanders as Pop Tate

== Music ==
Riverdale: Special Episode – Hedwig and the Angry Inch (Original Television Soundtrack)

Soundtrack album by Riverdale Cast
- Released: April 15, 2020
- Recorded: 2020
- Genre: Soundtrack
- Length: 33:58
- Label: WaterTower Music
- Producers: Leonard Jay Jackson; Ryan Petersen; Laura Jane Scott

Riverdale Cast chronology
Season 3 (Original Television Soundtrack) (2019)	''Riverdale: Special Episode – Hedwig and the Angry Inch (Original Television Soundtrack)'' (2020)	Season 4 (Original Television Soundtrack) (2020)

Riverdale soundtracks chronology
Halloween (Original Television Score) (2019)	Hedwig and the Angry Inch (2020)	Season 4 (Original Television Soundtrack) (2020)

Hedwig and the Angry Inch soundtracks chronology
Original Broadway Cast (2014)	Riverdale – Hedwig and the Angry Inch (2020)

On April 15, 2020, WaterTower Music released the musical soundtrack from the "Wicked Little Town" episode performed by cast members.

All tracks from Hedwig and the Angry Inch were written by Stephen Trask.

Track listing
No.	Title	Performer(s)	Length
1.	"Wicked Little Town"	Riverdale cast	3:27
2.	"Random Number Generation"	Riverdale cast	2:46
3.	"Tear Me Down"	Casey Cott, Vanessa Morgan, Drew Ray Tanner and Jordan Connor	3:35
4.	"Wig in a Box"	Lili Reinhart, Madelaine Petsch, Camila Mendes, Vanessa Morgan and Casey Cott	4:40
5.	"Sugar Daddy"	Madelaine Petsch and Vanessa Morgan	3:50
6.	"Exquisite Corpse"	KJ Apa, Lili Reinhart, Camila Mendes and Cole Sprouse	2:38
7.	"The Origin of Love"	KJ Apa, Lili Reinhart, Camila Mendes and Cole Sprouse	5:11
8.	"Wicked Little Town (Reprise)"	KJ Apa and Lili Reinhart	3:21
9.	"Midnight Radio"	Riverdale cast	4:28
Total length:			33:58

== Reception ==
=== Ratings ===
In the United States, the episode received a 0.2 percent share among adults between the ages of 18 and 49. It was watched by 0.54 million viewers.
