= Chapter Fifty-Eight: In Memoriam =

- Riverdale episode
- Some of the characters mourning the death of Fred Andrews
- Episode no.: Season 4 Episode 1
- Directed by: Gabriel Correa
- Written by: Roberto Aguirre-Sacasa
- Cinematography by: Ronald Richard
- Editing by: Dan Holland
- Production code: T13.21851
- Original air date: October 9, 2019
- Running time: 42 minutes

Guest appearances
- Shannen Doherty as Stranded Motorist; Martin Cummins as Tom Keller; Robin Givens as Sierra McCoy; Molly Ringwald as Mary Andrews; Trinity Likins as Jellybean Jones; Alvin Sanders as Pop Tate; Barbara Wallace as Rose Blossom

Episode chronology
← Previous "Chapter Fifty-Seven: Survive The Night"	Next → "Chapter Fifty-Nine: Fast Times at Riverdale High"

"Chapter Fifty-Eight: In Memoriam" is the first episode of the fourth season of Riverdale and the fifty-eighth overall. The episode was directed by Gabriel Correa and written by Roberto Aguirre-Sacasa. It originally aired on October 9, 2019 and according to Nielsen Media Research was watched by 1.14 million viewers. This episode marked Ashleigh Murray's last episode as a series regular and Shannen Doherty's final TV series appearance before her death in July 2024.

Acting as a stand-alone episode, it features the death of Fred Andrews (Luke Perry) and acts as a tribute to his actor, who died of a stroke in March earlier that year. The episode centres on Archie (KJ Apa) going to the nearby town of Cherry Creek to bring his father's body back to Riverdale after he is killed in a hit and run.

== Plot ==
As the town of Riverdale prepares to hold its first Independence Day parade since the death of Jason Blossom three years prior, Jason's sister Cheryl (Madelaine Petsch) attempts to cancel the festivities. Meanwhile, Archie Andrews (KJ Apa) receives a phone call that his father Fred was killed in a hit and run in the nearby town of Cherry Creek. Archie's girlfriend Veronica Lodge (Camila Mendes) offers to cover the funeral costs, but the funeral director informs him that the body cannot be transported to Riverdale until after the parade. After suffering a nightmare, Archie asks Veronica, Betty Cooper (Lili Reinhart), and Jughead Jones (Cole Sprouse) to drive with him to Cherry Creek and retrieve the body themselves.

The funeral director informs Archie that he cannot release the body without adult permission, which they receive from Archie's mother (Molly Ringwald). Afraid of facing the reality of his father's death, he asks Betty and Veronica to identify the body and Jughead to write the obituary. Later that day, the group goes to retrieve Fred's truck at the site of his death, and they find a woman (Shannen Doherty) on the side of the road. She explains that Fred had stopped to help her when her car broke down, and that he had pushed her out of the way of the speeding car that had killed him. The group prays together and leaves flowers on the roadside.

Archie becomes angry, both at his father for sacrificing himself, and at himself for not being there. Sheriff FP Jones (Skeet Ulrich) calls Archie and informs him that the driver who killed his father, a Cherry Creek resident named George Augustine, was released on bail. Archie finds Augustine's address and threatens him. George's son Jeffrey (Ryan Grantham) appears and reveals that he had been the hit and run driver, and that his father had taken the blame because Jeffrey did not have a driver's license. Archie forgives them, realizing that his father would have done the same for him, and Veronica assures Archie that Fred would be proud of him.

As the group drives back to Riverdale, with Archie and Veronica in the hearse and Betty and Jughead in Fred's truck, they find that the Independence Day parade has been transformed into a celebration of Fred. At the funeral, Archie delivers a speech where he remembers lighting fireworks with his father in their backyard. The night concludes with Archie and his friends recreating the backyard fireworks mentioned in Fred's eulogy.

== Production ==
Luke Perry's death came in the middle of the production of the third season in March 2019, and executive producer and showrunner Roberto Aguirre-Sacasa explained that they had made the decision to not address his death in season three as to not "sandwich it in between all the other plots". In June 2019 Aguirre-Sacasa announced that the season 4 premiere would be a tribute episode to Perry.

Production for the episode began early July 2019, and the month before, it was revealed that Perry's Beverly Hills, 90210 co-star and friend Shannen Doherty would make an appearance. Aguirre-Sacasa knew early on they wanted to include her in the episode, something that Perry had been attempting to do before. He explained, regarding her casting and role as the woman Fred saves, that he wanted someone Perry knew and cared about. Doherty explained that she only took on the role after receiving permission from Perry's family and manager. Aguirre-Sacasa also knew that they wanted Fred's death to be a heroic one that would impact Archie. They decided early on that the episode would not start any of the plots for the season, and would act as a standalone episode focused on Fred's death. Aquirre-Scasa said that he got inspiration for the tribute episode from the Friday Night Lights episode "The Son", which involved the death of a football players father. As well, Perry's family provided the show with photographs and video footage that was used during the episode, and were allowed to read the script before production began.

Aguirre-Sacasa described the table read for the episode as emotional, as it was the first time the cast was together following Perry's death. Regarding filming, Skeet Ulrich, who portrays F.P. Jones, described it as difficult, and though they wanted to honor Perry, it was difficult to perform. Molly Ringwald, who portrays Perry's on-screen wife, Mary Andrews, described the episode as "cathartic", as she was not able to attend Perry's memorial, and it allowed her to say good-bye to him. KJ Apa, who plays Perry's on-screen son Archie, recalled it being "a tough one because you have to kind of go back in time a little bit and go back and access that emotion again."

== Reception ==
=== Ratings ===
In the United States, the episode received a 0.4/2 percent share among adults between the ages of 18 and 49, meaning that it was seen by 0.4 percent of all households, and 2 percent of all of those watching television at the time of the broadcast. It was watched by 1.14 million viewers. At the time of airing, the episode garnered the highest ratings since the season three episode, "Chapter Forty-Six: The Red Dahlia", which garnered 1.26 million viewers.

=== Critical response ===
On review aggregator website Rotten Tomatoes, the episode holds an approval rating of 100% based on 14 reviews, and an average rating of 9.47/10. The site's critics consensus reads: "Bittersweet and beautiful, "In Memoriam" is a loving tribute to the beloved Luke Perry—a fitting sendoff for one of TVs favorite dads."

The episode received unanimous acclaim, with critics praising how the show handled Perry's death. Alexis Nedd from Mashable praised "the level of care that went into crafting the season premiere." She acknowledged the difficulty in watching some of the scenes because the emotions portrayed on screen mirrored those of the cast. Molly Fitzpatrick of Vulture and Samantha Highfill of Entertainment Weekly both gave positive reviews, calling the episode a fitting and beautiful tribute

Charles Bramesco of The A.V. Club gave the episode an A−, praising the show for its handling of the topic, complimenting the "foundation of earnest emotion in the response of the viewers at home, and the same goes for the performances from the actors who've parted with one of their own", singling out KJ Apa's performance in particular. In his review for Decider, Alex Zalben praised the episode for its "decision to put the viewer in Archie's shoes" by showing him grappling with his father's death. Laura Bradley of Vanity Fair praised the way the show handled the plot, focusing more on the emotions of the characters. In her review for The Washington Post, Sonia Rao praised how Riverdale "shed its campy neo-noir skin" to honor Perry and his character, and "instead [adopted] a more earnest tone to highlight the qualities that defined Fred." Geoff Boucher of Deadline Hollywood complimented Riverdale on being a "compelling fiction tailored to contain emotional real-life resonance", and praised the "heartfelt and burnished" tribute.
