= Riverdale season 3 =

Riverdale
- Season 3
- Home Media cover art
- Starring: KJ Apa; Lili Reinhart; Camila Mendes; Cole Sprouse; Marisol Nichols; Madelaine Petsch; Ashleigh Murray; Mark Consuelos; Casey Cott; Charles Melton; Vanessa Morgan; Skeet Ulrich; Mädchen Amick; Luke Perry
- No. of episodes: 22

Release
- Original network: The CW
- Original release: October 10, 2018 – May 15, 2019

Season chronology
- ← Previous; Season 2 Next → Season 4

The third season of Riverdale premiered on The CW on October 10, 2018 and concluded on May 15, 2019 with a total of 22 episodes. The series is based on the characters from the Archie Comics, created by Maurice Coyne, Louis Silberkleit, and John L. Goldwater, and was created by Roberto Aguirre-Sacasa.

The principal cast sees KJ Apa, Lili Reinhart, Camila Mendes, Cole Sprouse, Marisol Nichols, Madelaine Petsch, Ashleigh Murray, Mädchen Amick, Luke Perry, Mark Consuelos, Casey Cott, and Skeet Ulrich returning from the previous season. Charles Melton and Vanessa Morgan were promoted to series regulars after appearing as recurring stars in the previous season.

The season centres around the growing popularity of the game Gryphons and Gargoyles (based on Dungeons and Dragons), and the mysterious Gargoyle King. As well, the season focuses on a cult known as The Farm, who starts indoctrinating residents of Riverdale.

This season is the last one to feature Luke Perry as Fred Andrews, Perry died on March 4, 2019 almost at the completion of the season. All episodes of the season released after his death were dedicated to his memory.

== Episodes ==
No. overall	No. in season	Title	Directed by	Written by	Original release date	Prod. code	US viewers (millions)
36	1	"Chapter Thirty-Six: Labor Day"	Kevin Sullivan	Roberto Aguirre-Sacasa	October 10, 2018	T13.21251	1.50
Archie's friends and family spend the summer at his trial. The judge orders the jury to deliberate over Labor Day weekend. Archie, Betty, Veronica, and Jughead decide to spend the weekend together. A furious Veronica confronts Hiram, while Hiram explains that he did this because of her betrayal. Meanwhile, Betty has trouble with Alice and Polly as the two of them try to persuade her to join their cult, the Farm. Jughead faces off with Penny Peabody and the Ghoulies over Hot Dog and after taking over the Southside, the Ghoulies declare the Northside fair game. Later, Archie accepts a plea deal to serve two years in juvenile detention after a hung jury causes a mistrial. Betty arrives home and sees Alice and Polly carrying out a strange ceremony involving the twins and fire, triggering Betty to faint and convulse. Meanwhile, Dilton's strange actions lead Jughead to discover him and Ben in Fox Forest, unconscious in front of a dark skeletal totem Dilton had referred to as the Gargoyle King.
37	2	"Chapter Thirty-Seven: Fortune and Men's Eyes"	Jeff Woolnough	Michael Grassi	October 17, 2018	T13.21252	1.28
Archie is processed in jail, but without protection due to his refusal to stab a Ghoulie, he faces abuse from Ghoulies he previously helped lock up. Archie then tries to bring the prisoners together but his attempt is ambushed by Hiram, who orders the guards to beat the prisoners and start a riot. Dilton dies, and Betty and Jughead investigate what happened to him and Ben and discover three symbols etched into Dilton's back. They later search for Dilton's bunker where they find Ben and Dilton were participating in a board game turned lethal. They then question Ethel about the game, who after refusing to talk about it, begins to have a seizure. Later, at the hospital, Betty and Jughead witness Ben commit suicide, after claiming he will ascend to the Kingdom and be reunited with Dilton. Elsewhere, Fred, Hermione, Alice, F. P., Hiram, Sierra McCoy, Tom Keller, and Penelope Blossom gather to discuss an incident that occurred in their youth, one they swore not to speak of ever again. Hermione claims it is happening again with their children.
38	3	"Chapter Thirty-Eight: As Above, So Below"	Jeff Hunt	Aaron Allen	October 24, 2018	T13.21253	1.40
After spending time in solitary confinement, Archie accepts the Warden's offer to participate in a trial by combat beneath the prison. Veronica opens a speakeasy under Pop's but is shaken down by Sheriff Minetta and Penny. With Cheryl and Toni's help she gets evidence of the Whyte Worm being used to make jingle jangle, and blackmails Hiram. Betty befriends Evelyn to try learn more about the Farm and is taken aback when she learns Alice has told them all their family secrets. Meanwhile, Ethel plays Gryphons and Gargoyles with Jughead, and after giving Jughead the scripture, Ethel drinks from a poisoned chalice and is placed on suicide watch. Later, F. P. burns the scripture; however, a copy is placed in each student's locker at Riverdale High, with Ethel proclaiming to the Gargoyle King that everyone will soon join them.
39	4	"Chapter Thirty-Nine: The Midnight Club"	Dawn Wilkinson	Tessa Leigh Williams	November 7, 2018	T13.21254	1.37
With the Riverdale kids playing Gryphons and Gargoyles, Alice opens up to Betty about her past and her involvement with the game. In 1992, Alice, a rebellious teenager pregnant with F. P.'s child, is forced to spend detention along with Penelope, Sierra, Hermione, Fred, and F. P. Initially strangers, they soon find the Gryphons and Gargoyles game and play it as a group, gradually becoming addicted to it. However, after receiving strange invitations from the Gargoyle King, Alice soon finds the bathroom graffitied with messages and two chalices at the sink, then runs into the Gargoyle King. Principal Featherhead encounters the Gargoyle King and is found dead with the same symbols from Dilton's back etched into the door. The group vow to never talk about the incident. After explaining, Alice tells Betty that they do not know who was trying to kill one of them, but it was a member of their group. Later on, Betty finds Jughead in the cellar playing the game as he reveals he is a Level Three, and it's only a matter of time before he will ascend and meet the Gargoyle King.
40	5	"Chapter Forty: The Great Escape"	Pam Romanowsky	Greg Murray & Ace Hasan	November 14, 2018	T13.21255	1.25
Betty asks Jughead to investigate their parents as she believes one of them is a murderer. Jughead finds out the game is a metaphor for Riverdale itself, and claims he will eventually be able to confront the Gargoyle King. After a failed prison escape, Archie is branded by the Warden and finds out Hiram paid the witnesses to lie and frame him. Jughead tells F. P. whomever killed the principal when their parents were at school was the game master. Before the fight club, Joaquin stabs Archie, claiming the Warden told him if he did he would ascend. Joaquin is later seen by Kevin escaping to a "new gang". Veronica, Betty, Josie, Reggie, and Kevin hatch a plan and manage to help Archie escape and they hide him in Dilton's bunker. Jughead realizes Archie's brand is the same symbol that was on Dilton's back. Kevin, Josie, and Reggie begin to play the game. The Warden, set to meet with Hermione, commits suicide by cyanide poisoning after failing to ascend in the game by killing Archie. Jughead comes face to face with the Gargoyle King.
41	6	"Chapter Forty-One: Manhunter"	Rachel Talalay	Cristine Chambers	November 28, 2018	T13.21256	1.27
The students are questioned about their whereabouts during Archie's escape when Josie has a seizure. Betty gathers the Midnight Club at Veronica's speakeasy and questions them about the murder of Principal Featherhead, where Penelope confesses Dilton's father, Darryl, poisoned the chalices so they could all ascend together, and later killed himself out of guilt, but Betty is not convinced. Veronica, determined to clear Archie's name, finds the full interview footage on Hermione's computer proving Archie's innocence and emails it to the prosecution. Archie is cleared of all charges, but he refuses to return to Riverdale and breaks up with Veronica before leaving town with Jughead. Joaquin proclaims the symbol branded on Archie means sacrifices, and he is later found dead with the same symbol carved into his forehead. Meanwhile, Betty and Alice are horrified to find the Gargoyle King in their house. They retreat to Betty's room but find a gravestone on Betty's bed before F. P. arrives and comforts them. Later, Alice has Betty forcibly taken to the Sisters of Quiet Mercy where she discovers all the patients are painting pictures of the Gargoyle King.
42	7	"Chapter Forty-Two: The Man in Black"	Alex Pillai	Janine Salinas Schoenberg	December 5, 2018	T13.21257	1.09
Archie and Jughead plan to take a break at a farm, where they meet Laurie and Gracie. Laurie, during a meeting with Archie, kisses him and he reciprocates, but later thinks of Veronica and stops. Jughead finds children taking Fizzle Rocks and playing Gryphons and Gargoyles and the common symbols regarding the Gargoyle King appear. When Jughead finds that the entire town is owned by Hiram and Laurie is helping him trace Archie, he and Archie flee. Veronica moves out, and opens a casino in her speakeasy, later learning about Minetta's brutal killing. Betty finds Ethel at the Sisters of Quiet Mercy, where she tries to make her life seem insignificant. She finds the Sisters feeding the patients Fizzle Rocks and finds Hiram helping them to do so. Now with solid evidence of who the Sisters really are, she tries to flee, but the Sisters and Ethel catch her. They then make her meet the Gargoyle King and then forcefully feed her Fizzle Rocks. Later while being interrogated, Betty hallucinates and finds the Gargoyle King approaching her.
43	8	"Chapter Forty-Three: Outbreak"	John Kretchmer	James DeWille	December 12, 2018	T13.21258	1.20
The Riverdale Vixens squad suffer from a mass seizure with the exception of Cheryl who soon asks for Toni to move in. Veronica learns that Hiram intends to shut down Riverdale High. Reggie informs Veronica that the drugs are coming from the prison Hiram is constructing. In Toledo, Jughead and Archie meet his mother Gladys and sister Jellybean, and learn that Hiram intends to take over the town. Archie leaves to prevent danger. Betty learns that the Gargoyle King is a hallucination from the drugs and along with Ethel, ties up Sister Woodhouse. They set free the patients afterwards. Cheryl and Veronica interrogate Penelope and learn that she was helping Hiram. As they both, along with Kevin and the RROTC, decide to stop Riverdale from closing down, they are too late as the town is shut down, quarantined and blocked off. Alice takes Betty and the patients home. Hiram calls the Governor and thanks him for sealing the town off. They hang up and Hiram raises his drink to the Gargoyle King, who stands in front of him.
44	9	"Chapter Forty-Four: No Exit"	Jeff Hunt	Arabella Anderson	January 16, 2019	T13.21259	1.32
A month after Riverdale's shutdown, Archie has now fled town and staying in a cabin with Vegas. Betty has taken in the freed patients from the SOQM while Veronica is being forced by Hiram to pay for protection for the speakeasy. However, Reggie is beaten up by Gargoyle-dressed men sent by Hiram while on a run for supplies and eventually she hires the Serpents to protect her club. Cheryl and Toni are both kicked out of the Serpents after stealing from Hiram and Reggie and Veronica kiss. Meanwhile, Archie is attacked and mauled by a bear and experiences strange hallucinations before being found bloodied and unresponsive by park rangers while Betty tries to convince the nuns to testify against Hiram. After a meeting with a social worker, Betty realises that the nuns' religious protections may be useless but soon discovers that the Sisters have all committed suicide to avoid testifying against Hiram. Betty is shocked when she learns that Alice kicked out the patients from their house and shipped them off to the Farm.
45	10	"Chapter Forty-Five: The Stranger"	Maggie Kiley	Brian E. Paterson	January 23, 2019	T13.21260	1.12
Archie, having survived his attack, returns to Riverdale to face his demons and to overcome his problems. Alice liquidates Betty's college fund to provide for the escaped SOQM patients who have been living at the Farm. A furious Betty then seeks help from Attorney McCoy, who informs Betty that she must go visit Hal, as Alice forged his signature. Betty does so and finds Hal is impressed with the Gargoyle King's kill count and wants to see one of the game's manuals in return for him signing an affidavit for Betty so she can pursue legal action. Hal claims he had been the Gargoyle King who tried to poison the Midnight Club. Betty learns Penelope visits him and Hal had lied because he wants Betty to return for visits. The Serpents find Fangs and the Gargoyle Gang in a clearing in Fox Forest having a ceremony. They crash the ceremony and Jughead and F.P. unmask the Gargoyle King, revealing Tall Boy, who faked his death and has been working for Hiram. However, he is killed during an escape attempt. Hiram is shot and critically injured in the Pembrooke. Believing Archie may have been responsible, Veronica breaks up with Archie and reconciles with Reggie. Hermione appoints F.P. as the new sheriff of Riverdale after Claudius is found dead.
46	11	"Chapter Forty-Six: The Red Dahlia"	Greg Smith	Devon Turner & Will Ewing	January 30, 2019	T13.21261	1.26
Veronica sets Jughead out on a mission to find who shot her father. Betty investigates Penelope, learning that she killed Claudius and Clifford, and stumbles upon her brothel "The Maple Club". Meanwhile, Archie is still spiraling, and Josie tries to help him face his demons. Veronica and Reggie set out to find the truth about the quarantine and the series of seizures that occurred in the town. Jughead comes face-to-face with Mrs. Mulwray, and later finds that Sweet Pea, who had been tracking Hermione for him, spots her and the believed-to-be dead Sheriff Minetta conspiring against F.P. in a secluded cabin. Jughead goes and warns F.P. that Hermione put him up to shooting Hiram in the first place. Archie considers murdering Hiram, but ends up saving his life instead. After this, Veronica and Archie share their apologies and Hiram, now awake, calls a truce with Archie. Hermione, after meeting with Jughead, is called out on her mission to kill Hiram, and kills Minetta to tie up loose ends.
47	12	"Chapter Forty-Seven: Bizarrodale"	Harry Jierjian	Britta Lundin	February 6, 2019	T13.21262	0.96
Sierra McCoy and Tom Keller are preparing to get married where Kevin invites Moose to be his date and Moose decides to come out to his strict father Marcus. However, Moose is not ready yet and is almost outed by Cheryl during a school morning announcement but Moose decides to come out anyway after Kevin gives him an ultimatum and they consummate their love in Dilton's bunker. However, Sierra and Tom both receive a message from the "Gargoyle King" calling the Midnight Club to reassemble and complete their ascension that failed when they were teenagers. The parents assemble at the school to sip from the chalices; however, it is revealed to be a hoax. Marcus dresses up as the Gargoyle King and captures Kevin and Moose, hoping to scare his son straight. Moose leaves Riverdale afterwards. Archie and Josie get close to one another and kiss, starting a relationship while Veronica and Reggie discover that Jughead's mother Gladys is Hermione's buyer of the Fizzle Rocks lab which was burned. Gladys and Jellybean return to Riverdale, intending to stay for good with a plan.
48	13	"Chapter Forty-Eight: Requiem for a Welterweight"	Tawnia McKiernan	Michael Grassi	February 27, 2019	T13.21263	0.86
The Serpents' numbers have decreased due to the Pretty Poisons, leading Jughead to go after the Ghoulies. Archie has been getting into boxing and must throw his first fight. Hiram wants Veronica to take control of his drugs, but she starts working for Gladys. Alice is preparing to be rebaptized by the Farm, and only Betty realizes that she is doing something dangerous. The Ghoulies (now the Gargoyles) are led by Kurtz, who has been keeping G&G going. Kurtz tells Jughead that only the worthy will ascend, while promising the Gargoyle King is alive. Hiram and Gladys meet and when Gladys threatens Hermione, Veronica is forced to join Hiram. Betty meets with an ex-Farm member, who left the farm after her sister's death. Betty learns they believe in reaching near-death to reach ascension. Archie fights in the match but loses. Alice takes place in the rebirth. Almost dying, Polly and the Farm refuse to help her until Betty intervenes. Veronica covers for Hermione and now owes debt to Hiram. Gladys takes control of the Gargoyles. Alice claims she is reborn and sees her purpose. She says she will sell the house and she, Betty, and the Farm will be one forever.
49	14	"Chapter Forty-Nine: Fire Walk with Me"	Marisol Adler	Aaron Allen	March 6, 2019	T13.21264	0.92
Alice attempts to sell the house, only to be sabatoged by Betty. Archie finds a boy named Ricky branded with the Sacrifice Symbol in the boxing gym. He starts taking care of him, until Ricky runs away to hide from the Gargoyles. The Serpents, Gargoyles, and Pretty Poisons begin clashing at school, and chemistry equipment is stolen to make drugs. Betty finds Kevin going deep into the Farm, and stumbles across a ceremony where he walks across fire. She threatens to expose the Farm, but Evelyn and Kevin respond by threatening to expose all of Alice's secrets. Veronica opens a casino and uses it to lower her debt, leading to Hiram's associates clashing at a showcase. Veronica recruits the Pretty Poisons to work at the speakeasy, who ban Hiram and Gladys from entering. The Gargoyles and the Serpents begin working with the police, causing Kurtz to walk out. Archie finds out Ricky is Joaquin's little brother. Ricky reveals he is working with the Gargoyles and faked everything and tries to kill Archie to complete the Red Paladin quest. Jughead tells Archie that it is time for them to end it (along with Betty). Alice sells the house and comes home to find it in flames.
50	15	"Chapter Fifty: American Dreams"	Gabriel Correa	Roberto Aguirre-Sacasa	March 13, 2019	T13.21265	0.95
Archie, Betty, and Jughead set out on a journey to eliminate the "Red Paladin" quest from the realm of Gryphons and Gargoyles that was initially spread about by Hiram. Meanwhile, Betty finds out about Gladys' criminal intentions from Veronica after she learns that the Jones family has bought her house. After Betty informs Jughead of his mother's business in town, he becomes angered and plans to drive his mom out of town after giving a speech at F.P.'s 50th birthday party. Archie defeats all players that set out to kill him, lifting his brand for sacrifice. Cheryl and Toni continue to experience tension in their relationship, up to the point that Cheryl asks Toni to move out. Consequently, she summons Kevin to inform him that she must channel her anger into the school musical, which she demands to be Heathers.
51	16	"Chapter Fifty-One: Big Fun"	Maggie Kiley	Tessa Leigh Williams	March 20, 2019	T13.21266	0.81
While preparing the Riverdale High production of Heathers, Cheryl discovers that Toni has been assigned as choreographer while Kevin makes Evelyn co-director due to the Farm financially backing the musical. Veronica learns that her parents are breaking up and turns to Reggie for comfort. Jughead learns that the old trailer is being used as a Fizzle Rock lab by Gladys and with the help of Betty, sets fire to it. Betty becomes angered at Evelyn's involvement and attempts to involve Principal Weatherby who turns out to be a follower of the Farm. Evelyn throws a pre-show party where Kevin has a frightening drug induced hallucination driving him closer to Evelyn and the Farm. Toni and Cheryl soon decide to repair their relationship after a fight. Veronica divulges the state of her parents' marriage and Reggie, realizing this is why she slept with him, decides to end their relationship. On the night of the show, the cast performs, followed by the appearance of Edgar Evernever, Evelyn's father, who starts clapping while audience members dressed in white follow suit in giving a standing ovation to the musical.
52	17	"Chapter Fifty-Two: The Raid"	Pamela Romanowsky	Greg Murray & Ace Hasan	March 27, 2019	T13.21267	0.81
While on a tour of the Farm, Betty enlists Cheryl to help her infiltrate the farm. Archie is given word by his old cell mate, Mad Dog, that Leopold and Loeb is being closed, and that all juvenile prisoners are to be transferred to Hiram's prison. They persuade the governor to pardon Archie's prison friends. When they get out, they jump right into action helping Jughead take down the Gargoyles after Mad Dog learns his family is in danger. Veronica tries to get her parents together, but her plans do not work, when their marriage is annulled. While Cheryl is at the Farm, she gets in with Edgar, and they discuss Jason's death and the location of the testimonies that Betty wants Cheryl to get her hands on. Cheryl decides to join the cult, after she tells Betty that the Farm has allowed her to see Jason. Betty goes asks Alice if the reason she has joined the Farm is that she can see Charles, and Alice says yes. Jughead and Archie, receive a single baby tooth as a message. They learn that Archie's prison mate, Baby Teeth, has fallen victim to the Gargoyle King, after F.P. finds him dead in a clearing in the forest.
53	18	"Chapter Fifty-Three: Jawbreaker"	Gabriel Correa	Brian E. Paterson & Arabella Anderson	April 17, 2019	T13.21268	0.80
F.P. and Jughead investigate Baby Teeth's death; the coroner tells them that a matchbook from the Maple Club had been lodged in his throat at the time of his death. At Penelope's brothel, they find a client foaming at the mouth and gripping a knife after consuming a bad batch of Fizzle Rocks, known as "G". Kurtz is the one dealing “G”. Betty sends Toni the video of Clifford murdering Jason, but it does not convince Cheryl that Jason is dead. Betty tries the same tactic, as she takes Alice to a fake grave of Charles, she is not convinced. Betty chloroforms her and holds her in Dilton's bunker to force her to remember her past. She threatens both Edgar and Evelyn—but decides that she must let her mother heal. She hires Toni to join the Farm to try and free Cheryl and Alice. Archie, while participating in a boxing tournament, must rematch Randy Ronson, who has just taken "G" and collapses after the fight. F.P. and Jughead capture Kurtz making a drug deal at Archie's gym, he informs them that Jellybean has been "summoned". She is led into the woods with Ricky, who reveals the Gargoyle King standing behind her.
54	19	"Chapter Fifty-Four: Fear the Reaper"	Alexandra La Roche	Janine Salinas Schoenberg & Will Ewing	April 24, 2019	T13.21269	0.71
After the death of Randy Ronson, Elio tries to frame Archie for dealing him drugs to use for the fight. Veronica reveals that Archie and Mad Dog passed a drug test and helps Archie raise money for the Ronson family. The Jones family and Kurtz play a game of Gryphons and Gargoyles to bring Jellybean home. F.P. is shot while they rob Pop's, Gladys is severely stabbed while in a fight with an undead Penny Peabody; Jughead is nearly killed after Kurtz locks him in a freezer—emerging to find Kurtz has been killed by the Gargoyle King. Jughead returns home to Jellybean and Gladys makes the decision to leave town. Betty learns of Edgar's plans to adopt Polly's babies as his own after his marriage to Alice. Betty continues an investigation on the Farm, discovering that Evelyn is 26 years old, recruits teenagers, and is Edgar's wife. Josie leaves town. Betty enters the Farm to save the babies, but is led into a room of several cult members by Toni, who is now in the cult. They try to capture her. Later, Veronica tells Betty that her father has died in an accident while being transported to her father's prison.
55	20	"Chapter Fifty-Five: Prom Night"	David Katzenberg	Britta Lundin & Devon Turner	May 1, 2019	T13.21270	0.70
Betty is dubious that her father actually has died after seeing the crash scene with Veronica. At the same moment, Archie's mom returns to town and makes plans for Archie to meet with a recruiter at the naval academy so Archie can go to college on a boxing scholarship. While Cheryl and Toni campaign for prom queens, Edgar and Evelyn both remind them that doing so is against the rules of the Farm. Meanwhile, while Jughead speaks with Jellybean, she informs him about the Gargoyle King's gospel, which Jughead finds on an abandoned bus with F.P., so he can bring the serial killer down. When Betty wins prom queen, she is summoned by the Gargoyle King, who plans for her to ascend, placing chalices in the girls' bathroom. When Betty rejects and is about to shoot the Gargoyle King, the Black Hood attacks her, revealing to Betty that her dad did indeed survive the crash and is now working with the Gargoyle King. Afterwards, Betty goes to warn her mom that Hal is likely going to prey on the Farm next. In doing so, Betty is asked by Edgar if she will stay at the Farm for her safety, and she accepts.
56	21	"Chapter Fifty-Six: The Dark Secret of Harvest House"	Rob Seidenglanz	Cristine Chambers & James DeWille	May 8, 2019	T13.21271	0.74
Edgar has Betty come face-to-face with her "dark side", which he is faking. She learns that Kevin and Fangs have undergone massive surgeries, and Toni is next. Betty realizes Edgar hypnotizes and creates pain which makes everyone follow him. Jughead finds Ricky trying to ascend, who sends a group of Boy Scouts to attack him; he hides in the bunker where he finds Ethel. Jughead and Ethel search for a young scout that has gone to the abandoned bus at the junkyard, leading them into the arms of the Black Hood. Archie, Mary, and Veronica plan to get Hiram arrested when he makes a move at the town. During a boxing match Archie set up, the FBI arrests Hiram for illegal activity at his businesses, which includes La Bonne Nuit. Betty realizes that the Farm has been performing surgery to harvest organs; she informs Cheryl, who saves Toni from receiving her procedure. Toni escapes, but Cheryl is taken away by guards. When Betty warns Kevin and Fangs, they send her to the operating room so she can undergo her organ harvest next. At the police station, Ethel tells Jughead the Gargoyle King's identity—Jason Blossom. He digs up Jason's grave to reveal an empty casket.
57	22	"Chapter Fifty-Seven: Survive the Night"	Rachel Talalay	Roberto Aguirre-Sacasa & Michael Grassi	May 15, 2019	T13.21272	0.86
Penelope buys Betty from Edgar before receiving surgery, and she wakes at the Blossom Hunting Lodge where she finds the gang having dinner with Penelope. Penelope reveals herself as the mastermind of the game with Chic as the Gargoyle King. She sends them on a final quest. Alice learns of Edgar's plans for ascension and Cheryl attempts to break Kevin and Fangs out. Cheryl stumbles upon Jason, grave robbed by Edgar. Alice frees Juniper and Cheryl, staying back to save Polly. In the woods, the four are nearly killed and Betty shoots Hal to receive the antidote to cyanide. Penelope then kills Hal. The Pretty Poisons and the Serpents save the four before raiding the Farm, finding only Kevin. Penelope runs away. Hermione is arrested for attempting to kill Hiram, who begins plotting his revenge; Cheryl brings Jason's body home. Betty and Jughead are greeted at home by their brother, Charles, alive and an FBI agent, who reveals that Alice had been undercover at the Farm. The four vow to enjoy senior year. An ominous flash-forward shows Archie, Betty, and Veronica out in the woods and covered in blood, as they burn Jughead's beanie and vow to go their separate ways, so they will not get caught.

== Cast and characters ==
=== Main ===
- KJ Apa as Archie Andrews, the main protagonist of the series, Veronica's boyfriend and a student of Riverdale High now in juvie for a murder he never committed. (Note: Apa portrays young Fred Andrews in "Chapter Thirty-Nine: The Midnight Club".)
- Lili Reinhart as Betty Cooper, Jughead's girlfriend, Archie and Veronica's best friend and the Queen of the Southside Serpents. (Note: Reinhart portrays young Alice Cooper in "Chapter Thirty-Nine: The Midnight Club".)
- Camila Mendes as Veronica Lodge, Archie's girlfriend, Jughead and Betty's best friend and the owner of La Bonne Nuit who tries to help break Archie of Juvie. (Note: Mendes portrays young Hermione Lodge in "Chapter Thirty-Nine: The Midnight Club".)
- Cole Sprouse as Jughead Jones, Betty's boyfriend and the leader of the biker gang the Southside Serpents who faces off against the Gargoyles and Ghoulies and decides to help Archie break out of Juvie. (Note: Sprouse portrays young FP Jones in "Chapter Thirty-Nine: The Midnight Club".)
- Marisol Nichols as Hermione Lodge, Veronica's mother, Hiram's wife and the co-owner of criminal empire Lodge Industries who is revealed to also have played G&G and been a member of the Midnight Club as a teenager in the early 1990s.
- Madelaine Petsch as Cheryl Blossom, the leader of the cheerleading squad the River Vixens, Betty's second cousin and Toni's girlfriend who is also now a member of the Southside Serpents as well. (Note: Petsch portrays young Penelope Blossom in "Chapter Thirty-Nine: The Midnight Club".)
- Ashleigh Murray as Josie McCoy, the lead singer of the Pussycats who tries to help Archie. (Note: Murray portrays young Sierra McCoy in "Chapter Thirty-Nine: The Midnight Club".)
- Mark Consuelos as Hiram Lodge, Veronica's father, Hermione's husband, a drug dealer, mobster and CEO of Lodge Industries who campaigns to be mayor this season and was also a member of the Midnight Club and was playing G&G in the 1990s as a teenager.
- Casey Cott as Kevin Keller, Riverdale's resident gay student, Betty's best friend, a member of the RROTC Cadets and Fangs's boyfriend. (Note: Cott portrays young Tom Keller in "Chapter Thirty-Nine: The Midnight Club" and "Chapter Forty-Seven: Bizarrodale".)
- Charles Melton as Reggie Mantle, the town prankster and Riverdale High jock who helps Veronica with La Bonne Nuit. (Note: Melton portrays young Marty Mantle in "Chapter Thirty-Nine: The Midnight Club".)
- Vanessa Morgan as Toni Topaz, Cheryl's girlfriend and a member of the Southside Serpents.
- Skeet Ulrich as FP Jones, Jughead and Jellybean's father and Gladys's ex-husband who is now a retired member of the Serpents and also used to be a member of the Midnight Club and play G&G in High School.
- Mädchen Amick as Alice Cooper, Betty and Polly's mother, Hal's ex-wife and the co-owner and journalist for The Register who joins the Farm and is revealed to have been a member of the Midnight Club and played G&G in High School.
- Luke Perry as Fred Andrews, Archie's father, Mary's husband and the owner and foreman of Andrews Construction Company who was also a member of the Midnight Club and played G&G in High School.

=== Recurring ===
- Martin Cummins as Tom Keller, Kevin's father, Josie's soon-to-be stepfather, Sierra's soon-to-be husband and fiancé and the former sheriff of Riverdale who was a member of the Midnight Club as a teenager in the 1990s and played G&G whilst also dating a teenage Sierra.
- Robin Givens as Sierra McCoy, Josie's mother, Myles's ex-wife, Kevin's soon-to-be stepmother, Tom's fiancé and soon-to-be wife and the former mayor and now defense attorney of Riverdale who was a member of the Midnight Club as a teenager playing G&G and dated Tom as well back then.
- Brit Morgan as Penny Peabody, a corrupt lawyer and a former Serpent who is now the second leader of the Ghoulies alongside Malachai.
- Tiera Skovbye as Polly Cooper, Betty's older sister, Hal and Alice's daughter and Juniper and Dagwood's mother who joins the Farm alongside her mother.
- Henderson Wade as Sheriff Michael Minetta, the new corrupt sheriff of Riverdale on Hiram's payroll who also has a secret affair with Hermione.
- Jordan Connor as Sweet Pea, Jughead's right-hand man and best friend, Josie's boyfriend, Toni, Cheryl and Fangs's best friend and an arrogant and short-tempered Southside Serpent.
- Cody Kearsley as Moose Mason, a secretly bisexual student in Riverdale High who is also Kevin's secret boyfriend, Reggie's best friend, a Riverdale Bulldog and a member of the RROTC Cadets. (Note: Kearsley portrays young Marcus Mason in "Chapter Forty-Seven: Bizarrodale".)
- Drew Ray Tanner as Fangs Fogarty, a bisexual member of the Southside Serpents, Jughead, Toni and Sweet Pea's best friend and Kevin's boyfriend.
- Alvin Sanders as Pop Tate, the kindly and aging owner of Pop's Chocke-Litte Shoppe who provides comfort to the characters.
- Nathalie Boltt as Penelope Blossom, Cheryl's mother, Nana Rose's daughter-in-law and the Madame of a prostitution ring who was also a member of the Midnight Club and was playing G&G as a teenager.
- Zoé De Grand Maison as Evelyn Evernever, Edgar's wife posing as his daughter who enrolls into Riverdale High to get new people to the Farm.
- Shannon Purser as Ethel Muggs, a depressed student at Riverdale High who is now trapped at the Sisters of Quiet Mercy at the hands of the Gargoyle King.
- Rob Raco as Joaquin DeSantos, Kevin's former boyfriend and a member of the Southside Serpents who is now in juvie.
- Peter Bryant as Waldo Weatherbee, the principal of Riverdale High who is also interested in the Farm.
- William MacDonald as Warren Norton, the corrupt warden of Leopold & Loeb Detention Centre Juvie who is also on Hiram's payroll, played G&G and runs an underground fight club which consists of his inmates including Archie, Mad Dog and Joaquin.
- Link Baker as Captain Golightly, a corrupt prison guard at Leopold & Loeb under Hiram's payroll.
- Julian Haig as Elio Grande, a rich man who takes an interest in and competes with Veronica for La Bonne Nuit.
- Nikolai Witschl as Dr. Curdle Jr., Dr. Curdle Sr's son who takes over his morgue duties and helps Betty and Jughead after Curdle Sr mysteriously dies.
- Beverley Breuer as Sister Woodhouse, the hard-headed, commanding and controlling head nun of the Sisters of Quiet Mercy who secretly worships the Gargoyle King.
- Gina Gershon as Gladys Jones, Jughead and Jellybean's mother and FP's ex-wife who returns to Riverdale.
- Trinity Likins as Jellybean Jones, Jughead's younger sister and Gladys and FP's daughter who returns to Riverdale with her mother.
- Bernadette Beck as Peaches n' Cream, a young girl and former Serpent from the Southside streets picked to be a member of the Pretty Poisons.
- Chad Michael Murray as Edgar Evernever, the leader of the Farm and Evelyn's husband posing as her father who takes in new people including Alice and Polly to mind-control them.

=== Guest ===
- Major Curda as Dilton Doiley, the leader of the Riverdale Boy scouts who starts playing G&G. (Note: Curda portrays young Daryl Doiley in "Chapter Thirty-Nine: The Midnight Club".)
- Tommy Martinez as Malachai, the leader of the Ghoulies who tries to kill the Serpents alongside Penny.
- Penelope Ann Miller as Mrs. Wright, a corrupt defense attorney on Hiram's payroll who gets Archie arrested.
- Molly Ringwald as Mary Andrews, Archie's mother and lawyer, Fred's wife and a defense attorney from Chicago who tries to defend her son.
- Chris Britton as Judge, the judge at Archie's trial.
- Harrison MacDonald as Cassidy Bullock, a gangster associate of Hiram's who was murdered last season. The blame was put on Archie for the murder since he was there and witnessed it.
- Moses Thiessen as Ben Button, a Riverdale pizza delivery boy who hangs out at Pop's and has started to play G&G with Dilton.
- Eli Goree as Mad Dog, a Leopold & Loeb inmate who becomes Archie's best friend, protege and sparring partner.
- Simon C. Hussey as Marcus Mason, Moose's father and the instructor for the RROTC who disapproves of his son's bisexuality because of his past.
- Michael Consuelos as young Hiram Lodge
- Anthony Michael Hall as Principal Featherhead, the principal of Riverdale High in the 1990s who gives a young Alice, Fred, Hermione, Sierra, FP and Penelope detention.
- Zachary Hayden as young Hal Cooper
- Sean Kennedy as Forsythe Pendleton Jones I, FP's alcoholic and abusive father and the leader of the Southside Serpents in the 1990s shown in flashbacks.
- Trevor Stines as young Clifford Blossom
- Barclay Hope as Claudius Blossom, the deceased Clifford's twin brother, Penelope's adoptive brother later brother-in-law, Nana Rose's son, Cheryl's paternal uncle and a drug dealer.
- Riley Keough as Laurie Lake, a G&G addict and farm hand who is revealed to be an agent sent by Hiram.
- Matthew Yang King as Marty Mantle, Reggie's abusive father, a car salesman and the owner of Jamboree Luxury Cars who was also formerly the Captain of the Riverdale Bulldogs and a member of the Midnight Club playing G&G in the 1990s as a teenager.
- Camille Legg as Hannah, an associate of Laurie and Gracie who is secretly working for Hiram.
- Angela Moore as Sister Agnes, a nun at the Sisters of Quiet Mercy.
- Wylie-Jane Stiver as Gracie Lake, Laurie's younger sister and Hannah's friend who is secretly on Hiram's payroll and is addicted to G&G.
- Barbara Wallace as Rose Blossom, the aging matriarch of the Blossom family, Cheryl's grandmother, Claudius's mother and Penelope's mother-in-law who is also one of Riverdale's old residents.
- William Dickinson as Tyler, an acquaintance of Josie and the Pussycats.
- Brad Mann as Leo, an acquaintance of Josie and the Pussycats.
- Todd Mann as Nico, an acquaintance of Josie and the Pussycats.
- Scott McNeil as Tall Boy, a former Southside Serpent and FP's former second-in-command and right-hand man who is now working for Malachai, Penny and the Ghoulies.
- Lochlyn Munro as Hal Cooper, Betty and Polly's father, Alice's ex-husband and the former owner of The Register who is also the serial killer the Black Hood.
- Kelly Ripa as Ms. Mulwray, Hiram's secret mistress
- Bruce Blain as Vic, a former worker for Andrews Construction Company.
- Tom McBeath as Smithers, the Lodge family's butler at the Pembrooke who is loyal to Veronica and Hermione.
- Scott Pocha as Toby, a Northside Street kid who becomes acquainted with Archie and Mad Dog.
- Brittany Willacy as Laura, a woman connected to Kurtz.
- Jonathan Whitesell as Kurtz, a psychotic member of the Ghoulies.

== Production ==
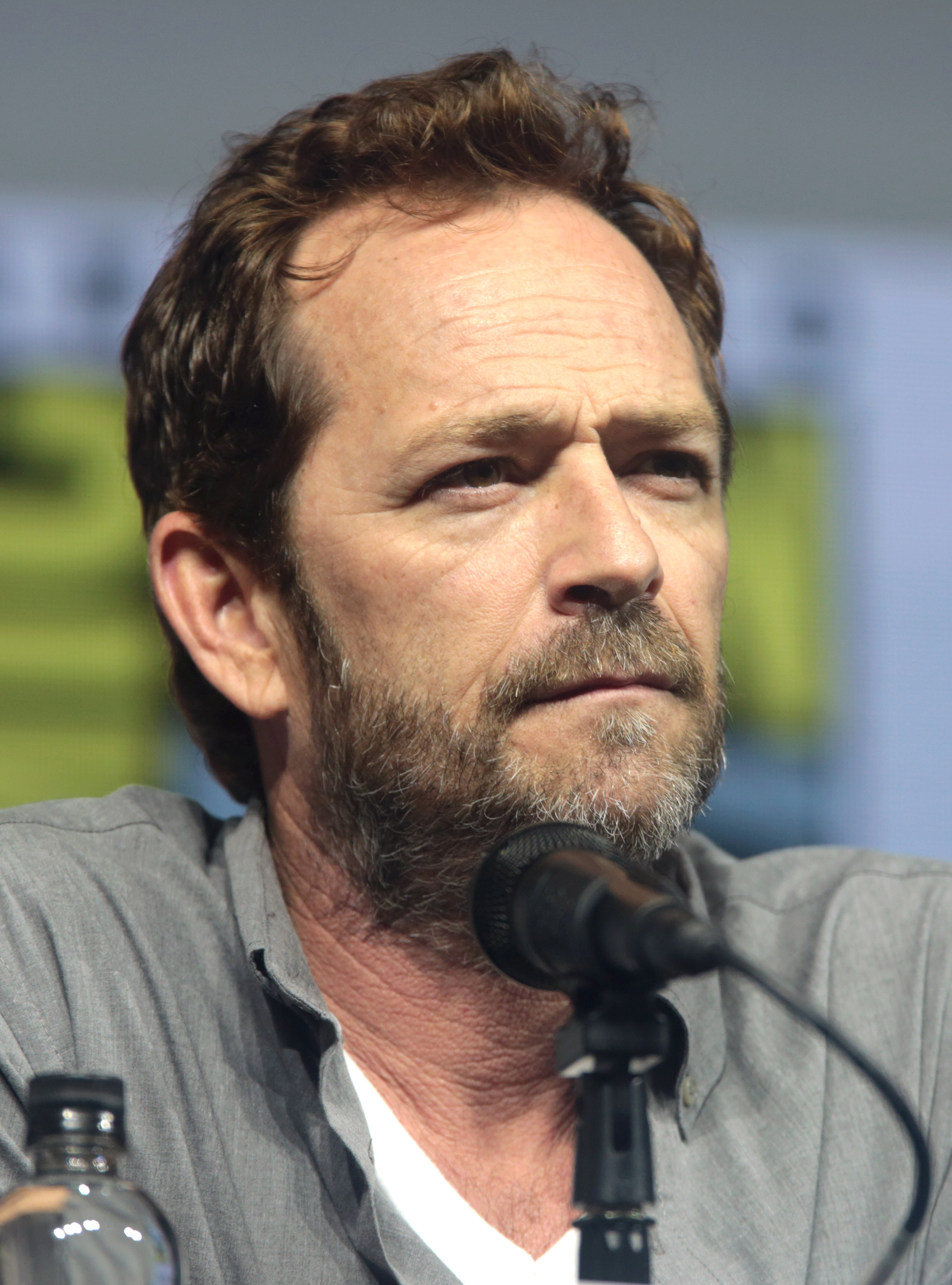
Luke Perry died at age 52, almost at the completion of the season production.

=== Development ===
The show was renewed by The CW for a third season on April 2, 2018. Filming for the season began on July 10, 2018 in Vancouver and ended in late March 2019.

=== Casting ===
On May 2, 2018, it was announced Vanessa Morgan and Charles Melton were promoted to the main cast On July 22, 2018 Penelope Ann Miller joined the cast as Mrs. Wright. On August 10, 2018, it was announced Michael Consuelos, son of Mark Consuelos, joined the cast playing a young version of his father's character Hiram Lodge on the fourth episode of the season titled "Chapter Thirty-Nine: The Midnight Club", which is an homage to the cult-classic film The Breakfast Club. Anthony Michael Hall (one of the Breakfast Club stars) joined the cast on August 21, 2018 playing Mr. Featherhead also during the fourth episode. On September 29, 2018, it was announced Riley Keough joining the season as a guest star. Gina Gershon and Trinity Likins joined the cast on October 7, 2018 playing Jughead's mother and sister, respectively.

In February 2019, Chad Michael Murray was cast as the recurring role of Edgar Evernever, the cult leader of The Farm and Evelyn's father.

=== Luke Perry's death ===
On February 27, 2019, Luke Perry (Fred Andrews on the show) suffered a massive ischemic stroke at his home in Sherman Oaks, Los Angeles. After a second stroke, his family decided to remove him from life support and he died on March 4, at age 52 at Providence Saint Joseph Medical Center in Burbank. The day of Perry's death, Riverdale's production was suspended and remained so for several days in order to give the cast and crew time to grieve Perry's passing. Also due to Perry's death, the season went on a 3-week hiatus from March 27 to April 17, 2019, with the final 5 episodes of the season premiering 2 weeks after their respective original air dates. All of the episodes of the season starting from episode 14, "Chapter Forty-Nine: Fire Walk with Me" were dedicated to Perry's memory, and his final physical appearance on the show was in episode 19, "Chapter Fifty-Four: Fear the Reaper".

== Music ==
Riverdale: Season 3 (Original Television Soundtrack) track listing
No.	Title	Artist(s)	Length
1.	"Jailhouse Rock"	Ashleigh Murray, Madelaine Petsch and Camila Mendes	2:28
2.	"Anything Goes"	Ashleigh Murray	3:53
3.	"Another Hundred People"	Ashleigh Murray	2:12
4.	"Dream Warriors"	K.J. Apa, Ashleigh Murray, Camila Mendes and Lili Reinhart	3:04
5.	"Cabaret"	Ashleigh Murray	3:20
6.	"Maybe This Time"	Camila Mendes	2:46
7.	"Eres tú"	Camila Mendes	2:50
8.	"Sooner or Later"	Ashleigh Murray	3:19
9.	"People Like Us"	Ashleigh Murray and K.J. Apa	3:44
10.	"We Don't Need Another Hero"	Ashleigh Murray	3:12
11.	"Don't Let Me Be Misunderstood"	Gina Gershon	2:06
12.	"Call Your Girlfriend"	Camila Mendes and Vanessa Morgan	3:48
13.	"Back to Black"	Ashleigh Murray	4:02
14.	"Daddy Lessons"	Camila Mendes	3:50

== Release ==
The first trailer of the season was screened at the 2018 San Diego Comic-Con on July 22, 2018. The season premiered on October 10, 2018 and ended on May 15, 2019. The complete season was available on Netflix in the United States on May 23, 2019 and in Latin America became available on October 9, 2019. The complete season was released on DVD & Blu-ray by Warner Archives on August 13, 2019.

== Home media ==
The Complete Third Season was officially released on DVD and Blu-ray in region 1 and region A on August 13, 2019, by Warner Archives. This season became the first of the series to be released as a manufacture-on-demand DVD by Warner Archives, as well, this is the final season of the show tohat was released on Blu-ray.

Riverdale: The Complete Third Season
Set details		Special features
22 episodes; 4-disc set; English (5.1 Dolby Digital); English SDH subtitles; Runtime: 929 minutes		2 All-New Featurettes: Riverdale: 2018 Comic-Con Panel; Animal Instincts: Archie and The Pit
Release dates
Region 1	Region 2	Region 4
August 13, 2019	TBA	October 16, 2019

== Reception ==
=== Critical response ===
On review aggregator website Rotten Tomatoes, the third season holds an approval rating of 84% based on 6 reviews, and an average rating of 7.69/10. The site's critics consensus reads: "Suspend your disbelief and hold on to your beanie: Season 3 of Riverdale is off the rails, and delightfully so."

=== Ratings ===
Viewership and ratings per episode of Riverdale season 3
No.	Title	Air date	Rating/share (18–49)	Viewers (millions)	DVR (18–49)	DVR viewers (millions)	Total (18–49)	Total viewers (millions)
1	"Chapter Thirty-Six: Labor Day"	October 10, 2018	0.5/2	1.50	0.7	1.34	1.2	2.84
2	"Chapter Thirty-Seven: Fortune and Men's Eyes"	October 17, 2018	0.4/2	1.28	0.6	1.27	1.0	2.55
3	"Chapter Thirty-Eight: As Above, So Below"	October 24, 2018	0.5/2	1.40	0.4	1.03	0.9	2.43
4	"Chapter Thirty-Nine: The Midnight Club"	November 7, 2018	0.4/2	1.37	0.5	1.15	0.9	2.52
5	"Chapter Forty: The Great Escape"	November 14, 2018	0.4/2	1.25	0.5	1.01	0.9	2.26
6	"Chapter Forty-One: Manhunter"	November 28, 2018	0.4/2	1.27	0.5	1.01	0.9	2.28
7	"Chapter Forty-Two: The Man in Black"	December 5, 2018	0.4/2	1.09	0.5	1.05	0.9	2.14
8	"Chapter Forty-Three: Outbreak"	December 12, 2018	0.4/2	1.20	0.5	1.08	0.9	2.28
9	"Chapter Forty-Four: No Exit"	January 16, 2019	0.5/2	1.32	0.4	1.00	0.9	2.32
10	"Chapter Forty-Five: The Stranger"	January 23, 2019	0.4/2	1.12	0.4	0.95	0.8	2.07
11	"Chapter Forty-Six: The Red Dahlia"	January 30, 2019	0.4/2	1.26	0.4	0.91	0.8	2.18
12	"Chapter Forty-Seven: Bizarrodale"	February 6, 2019	0.3/2	0.96	0.4	0.93	0.7	1.89
13	"Chapter Forty-Eight: Requiem for a Welterweight"	February 27, 2019	0.3/2	0.86	0.4	0.87	0.7	1.73
14	"Chapter Forty-Nine: Fire Walk with Me"	March 6, 2019	0.3/2	0.92	0.3	0.80	0.6	1.72
15	"Chapter Fifty: American Dreams"	March 13, 2019	0.3/2	0.95	0.3	0.78	0.6	1.73
16	"Chapter Fifty-One: Big Fun"	March 20, 2019	0.3/2	0.81	0.3	0.66	0.6	1.47
17	"Chapter Fifty-Two: The Raid"	March 27, 2019	0.3/2	0.81	0.3	0.76	0.6	1.57
18	"Chapter Fifty-Three: Jawbreaker"	April 17, 2019	0.2/2	0.80	0.3	0.64	0.5	1.44
19	"Chapter Fifty-Four: Fear the Reaper"	April 24, 2019	0.2/1	0.71	0.3	0.70	0.5	1.41
20	"Chapter Fifty-Five: Prom Night"	May 1, 2019	0.2/1	0.70	0.3	0.66	0.5	1.36
21	"Chapter Fifty-Six: The Dark Secret of Harvest House"	May 8, 2019	0.3/1	0.74	0.2	0.70	0.5	1.44
22	"Chapter Fifty-Seven: Survive the Night"	May 15, 2019	0.3/2	0.86	0.2	0.61	0.5	1.47
