= Chapter Fifty-One: Big Fun =

- Riverdale episode
- Promotional poster
- Episode no.: Season 3 Episode 16
- Directed by: Maggie Kiley
- Written by: Tessa Leigh Williams
- Based on: Characters by Archie Comics and Daniel Waters; Heathers: The Musical by; Laurence O'Keefe; Kevin Murphy
- Cinematography by: Brendan Uegama
- Editing by: Dan Holland; Daniel Hahn
- Production code: T13.21266
- Original air date: March 20, 2019
- Running time: 42 minutes

Episode chronology
← Previous "Chapter Fifty: American Dreams"	Next → "Chapter Fifty-Two: The Raid"

"Chapter Fifty-One: Big Fun" is the sixteenth episode of the third season of the American television series Riverdale and the fifty-first episode of the series overall. The episode was directed by Maggie Kiley, written by Tessa Leigh Williams, and choreographed by Heather Laura Gray. It centered around the stage musical Heathers: The Musical by Laurence O'Keefe and Kevin Murphy, based on the 1989 film of the same name written by Daniel Waters.

It originally aired on The CW on March 20, 2019 and according to Nielsen Media Research, was watched by 0.83 million viewers.

It is the second musical episode in the series, after "Chapter Thirty-One: A Night to Remember" (season 2; Carrie: The Musical). It was later followed by "Chapter Seventy-Four: Wicked Little Town" (season 4; Hedwig and the Angry Inch), "Chapter Ninety-One: The Return of the Pussycats" (season 5; on Josie and the Pussycats), "Chapter Ninety-Four: Next to Normal" (season 5; on Next to Normal) and "Chapter One Hundred and Twelve: American Psychos" (season 6; on American Psycho: The Musical).

== Plot ==
Kevin explains to Mayor Lodge and Principal Weatherbee the significance of performing Heathers as the school musical (Beautiful). Cheryl discovers that Toni has been assigned as choreographer and they argue about who should choreograph the dance (Candy Store). Kevin makes Evelyn co-director due to the Farm financially backing the musical. Betty is annoyed at Kevin and tries to convince him to stop Evelyn from being the co-director. To celebrate Evelyn throws a pre-show party in their costumes (Big Fun) where Kevin has a frightening drug induced hallucination driving him closer to Evelyn and the Farm. Veronica learns that her parents are getting a divorce and turns to Reggie for comfort. In the morning, Josie and Archie affirm their relationship to the cast (Fight for Me) much to Sweet Pea's dismay. Cheryl and Toni have a public altercation in the school corridors, ending with Cheryl telling Toni to leave Riverdale High (Dead Girl Walking). Betty witnesses Kevin and Fangs taking part in a Farm ritual (Our Love is God) and takes photographs as proof to Principal Weatherbee who is revealed to also be a follower of the Farm. Jughead learns that the old trailer is being used as a Fizzle Rock lab by his mother Gladys who recently returned to Riverdale and struggles to decide what to do with Betty. Meanwhile, Toni and Cheryl try to repair their relationship (Seventeen). Veronica divulges the state of her parents marriage and Reggie, realizing this is why she slept with him after the party, decides to end their relationship, leaving Veronica feeling isolated (Lifeboat). On the night of the show Betty and Jughead set fire to the trailer. The cast performs (Seventeen (Reprise)) at the end of the musical. Edgar Evernever, Evelyn's father, appears in the audience and starts to clap while other Farm members, dressed in white, follow suit giving a standing ovation to the musical. This distresses the cast, especially Betty.

== Cast and characters ==
=== Starring ===
- KJ Apa as Archie Andrews / Kurt Kelly
- Lili Reinhart as Betty Cooper / Heather Duke
- Camila Mendes as Veronica Lodge / Heather McNamara
- Cole Sprouse as Jughead Jones
- Marisol Nichols as Hermione Lodge
- Madelaine Petsch as Cheryl Blossom / Heather Chandler
- Ashleigh Murray as Josephine "Josie" McCoy / Veronica Sawyer
- Mark Consuelos as Hiram Lodge
- Casey Cott as Kevin Keller / Peter Dawson
- Skeet Ulrich as F.P. Jones
- Charles Melton as Reggie Mantle / Ram Sweeney
- Vanessa Morgan as Antoinette "Toni" Topaz / Betty Finn

Mädchen Amick and Luke Perry are credited but do not appear in the episode.

=== Guest starring ===
- Zoé De Grand Maison as Evelyn Evernever / Pauline Fleming
- Drew Ray Tanner as Fangs Fogarty
- Jordan Connor as Sweet Pea / Jason "J.D." Dean
- Gina Gershon as Gladys Jones
- Trinity Likins as Jellybean Jones
- Peter James Bryant as Waldo Weatherbee
- Bernadette Beck as Peaches 'n Cream
- Nathalie Boltt as Penelope Blossom
- Emilija Baranac as Midge Klump
- Chad Michael Murray as Edgar Evernever

Martin Cummins is credited but does not appear in the episode.

== Music ==
Riverdale: Special Episode – Heathers: The Musical (Original Television Soundtrack)

Soundtrack album by Riverdale Cast
- Released: March 21, 2019
- Recorded: 2019
- Genre: Soundtrack
- Length: 26:22
- Label: WaterTower Music
- Producers: Leonard Jay Jackson; Ryan Petersen

Riverdale Cast chronology
Season 2 (Original Television Soundtrack) (2018)	''Riverdale: Special Episode – Heathers: The Musical (Original Television Soundtrack)'' (2019)	Season 3 (Original Television Soundtrack) (2019)

Riverdale soundtracks chronology
Season 2 (Original Television Score) (2018)	Heathers: The Musical (2019)	Season 3 (Original Television Soundtrack) (2019)

Heathers soundtracks chronology
Heathers (2018)	Riverdale – Heathers: The Musical (2019)

On March 21, 2019, WaterTower Music released the musical soundtrack from "Big Fun" episode performed by cast members.

The lyrics from the songs in the episode are from the High School Edition of the musical with most of the profanity deleted.

All tracks from Heathers: The Musical were written by Laurence O'Keefe and Kevin Murphy, respectively.

Track listing
No.	Title	Performer(s)	Length
1.	"Beautiful"	Riverdale cast	4:52
2.	"Candy Store"	Madelaine Petsch, Lili Reinhart, Camila Mendes, Vanessa Morgan and Bernadette Beck	2:42
3.	"Fight for Me"	Ashleigh Murray and KJ Apa	2:04
4.	"Big Fun"	Riverdale cast	2:59
5.	"Dead Girl Walking"	Vanessa Morgan, Bernadette Beck, Jordan Connor and Madelaine Petsch	3:25
6.	"Our Love Is God"	Zoé De Grand Maison, Casey Cott and Drew Ray Tanner	2:58
7.	"Seventeen"	Lili Reinhart, Cole Sprouse, Vanessa Morgan and Madelaine Petsch	3:13
8.	"Lifeboat"	Camila Mendes	1:38
9.	"Seventeen (Reprise)"	Riverdale cast	2:31
Total length:			26:22

== Reception ==
=== Ratings ===
In the United States, the episode received a 0.3/2 percent share among adults between the ages of 18 and 49, meaning that it was seen by 0.3 percent of all households, and 2 percent of all of those watching television at the time of the broadcast. It was watched by 0.83 million viewers.

=== Critical response ===
On Rotten Tomatoes, the episode has a rating of 82%, based on 11 reviews.
