= Kane Jenkins =

- Shortland Street character
- Portrayed by: KJ Apa
- Duration: 2013–2015
- First appearance: 11 December 2013
- Last appearance: 6 July 2015
- Introduced by: Simon Bennett
In-universe information
- Father: Jimmy Isaac
- Mother: Jennifer Jenkins
- Sisters: Dayna Jenkins
- Half-sisters: Stevie Isaac

Kane Jenkins is a fictional character on the New Zealand soap opera Shortland Street. He was portrayed by KJ Apa from late-2013 to mid-2015. The character was introduced as part of the extended Cooper family unit and as a means to depict teenage suicide.

== Creation and casting ==
Often known to depict contemporary topical and ethical issues in 2013 Shortland Street producers decided to undergo a storyline that would reflect the high rates of teenage suicide in New Zealand. They wrote the role of Kane, the teenage brother of Dayna Jenkins. Reuben Milner auditioned for the role, but was instead cast as Kane's best friend Jack. With no prior acting experience, KJ Apa won the role. He had organised an audition through his modelling agency and within weeks had begun filming. Kane debuted on screen on 11 December 2013. Whilst filming the show, Apa also studied at Kings College. Apa had to quit high school rugby to act in the show but was allowed travel between school and the set as part of his contract. In May 2015 speculation arose that Kane would be departing the show when Apa was spotted in Los Angeles. Apa had previously stated he would "wait and see" how long he stayed on the show. The rumours proved to be true with Apa quitting the role after 18 months. Kane made his last appearance on screen on 6 July 2015. Apa was rumoured to return for the show's 25th anniversary in 2017.

== Storylines ==
Kane arrived to visit his brain dead mother, Jennifer before her life support was turned off. During his visit Kane stayed with the Cooper family, Wendy (Jacqueline Nairn) and Murray (Matthew Chamberlain) and in the new year, agreed to be fostered by them. He began to date Honour Aleni (Sophie McIntosh) and accepted a rugby scholarship to a prestigious private school, only to lose this and get suspended when Murray Cooper (Matthew Chamberlain) became over invested in his schoolwork and started doing it himself. Kane and Honour broke up and after having his life saved by his best friend Toby (Robert Evison), helped him cover up the murder of Brett Franklin (Matt Dwyer). The revelation of the murder saw Kane facing serious charges of covering the crime up which was followed by an injury to his leg, leaving him out of rugby season. Depressed and alone he began to rely on his best friend Jack (Reuben Milner). However Jack mistook this for romance and made a move on Kane, leading to the two falling out and Kane subsequently being bullied when his school friends believed he was gay.

Declining help from his family, Kane decided to commit suicide and attempted to gas himself in the Cooper family car. He was rescued however by his family and finally accepted help for his depression, ultimately reconciling with Jack and returning to rugby. The charges against Kane for his part in Brett's murder were ultimately dropped. Kane was pleased when his father Jimmy (Joel Tobeck) arrived in town and began spending time with him. However it soon appeared as though he was using Kane to store dodgy money for him. However it shockingly turned out he was dating Kane's foster sister Bella (Amelia Reid-Meredith) and impregnanted her. Kane began to excel in rugby and was offered a rugby scholarship to a national rugby academy. However he began to sleep with his PE teacher Ms. Herve (Jazmyne Van Gosliga), putting this at risk. Jimmy and Murray managed to scare Ms. Herve off much to Kane's annoyance but he ultimately decided to pursue the rugby scholarship. Kane departed to Palmerston North to finish his final 2 years of school and play rugby. Before Wendy's life support machine was turned off, she was seen listening to Kane saying his farewell on the phone.

== Character development ==
=== Ed Sheeran ===
In 2014 Shortland Street producers were contacted by internationally acclaimed singer-songwriter Ed Sheeran to ask whether he could have a part in the show as he had seen it, and enjoyed it. The scene was written surrounding the character of Kane who was to be helped by Ed whilst in the middle of a personal crisis. Apa did not consider himself an Ed Sheeran fan but was still "nervous" acting alongside him. He believed he was the most "high-up" there celebrity Shortland Street had managed to secure on the show. Kane came out of the scene better off Apa believed, "In a previous storyline Kane, Honour and Toby had written a song for a fundraiser. Kane just started playing that and he sort of, well he didn't teach Ed Sheeran how to play, but Ed just started playing it and was giving him tips on how to sing ... Kane is starstruck as well, just as anyone would be. It cheers him up. It does what Ed is trying to do. The song was written especially for the scene by the show's composer Graham Bollard.

=== Teenage suicide ===
Shortland Street primarily focuses on drama and romance based storylines but occasionally covers topical storylines and specifically "medical storylines that resonate with the community." Storyliners became aware of shocking statistics of youth suicide within New Zealand and it was a topic that producer Simon Bennett "cared deeply about". The decision was made to create the character of Kane, a teenager that throughout the course of an 18-month period would decide to take his own life. With such a sensitive subject matter, storyliners consulted the Mental Health foundation routinely throughout the plot line to ensure they were correctly portraying the decline into depression and the steps of suicide. The storyline saw Kane under immense pressure after a leg injury removed him from his sporting ambitions and his best friend Jack (Reuben Milner) came out of the closet to him leading to estrangement. Kane also became the victim of online bullying. The storyline progressed over several months with the decline into depression slowly coming across through character development and the manner in which Apa portrayed Kane.

"This young actor managed perfectly to depict that decline into a serious depression. His body language was faultless. He even seemed to have the 'dead eyes' I associate with depression.."

— A bipolar sufferer describing Apa's portrayal of Kane's depression.

With consideration from mental health experts, it was decided to publicly announce the storyline was to occur so as to warn viewers of the intensity of the episode. A message was also screened prior to the airing and online, alerting viewers how to address the issue if suffering themselves. So as to avoid copycat style incidents, the actual suicide attempt was not screened but rather alluded to. This involved Kane's foster family finding him unconscious after gassing himself in the family car. Apa was pleased to work on the storyline believing it was the "hardest" thing he had to do but he was proud he, "got to be involved with something that could be beneficial to New Zealand. I’ve had some big storylines this year, but I’m loving it." Cast and crew members were trained with the aftermath of the episode and how to deal with affected viewers, family, and friends. In addition to this, higher levels of staff moderating the soap opera's social media accounts were hired to watch for distressed viewers. The Mental Health foundation were pleased with the manner to which the storyliners decided to take the storyline with Kane surviving and his route to recovery being witnessed. Kane ultimately ended up accepting the help of his family and slowly recovered from his attempt and his depression. Dialogue was included within scripts concerning recovery, with suggestions of healthy nutrition, exercise, and communication being written in.

== Reception ==
Kane was frequently referred to by media as a "heart throb". Apa was reportedly used to fans "swooning, whispering, and pointing" at him on the streets. The portrayal of the suicide storyline was applauded due to its sensitivity and "confrontational" nature. Some viewers online expressed shock and annoyance at the level of detail to which the suicide was outlined, despite the purposeful attempts to reduce exposure to the actual attempt by producers. The New Zealand Herald columnist Robyn Yousef highly praised the storyline and the portrayal by Apa. She believed it was sensitively carried out and accurately acted. Ultimately she concluded that the storyline would have helped educate New Zealand families and may even have saved young peoples lives. Shortland Street was lauded following the COVID-19 lockdown as an accurate reflection of New Zealand life, with storylines such as Kane's suicide attempt enabling difficult conversations within society. In 2017 stuff.co.nz journalist Fleur Mealing named Kane as the 6th character she most wanted to return for the show's 25th anniversary, citing the need for "young blood" on the show.
