= Bernadette Beck =

English actress

- Born: 1994 (age 30–31); Islington, England
- Occupation(s): Actress, entrepreneur, philanthropist, stunt woman.
- Known for: Her role as Peaches 'N Cream on The CW's fan-favorite series, "Riverdale," and The CW's "Supernatural."
- Notable work: In 2019, co-founded an environmental non-profit which combats deforestation internationally.

Bernadette Beck (born 1994) is an English actress, entrepreneur, philanthropist, and stunt woman. She was born in Islington, London, England. She is best known for her role as Peaches 'N Cream on The CW series Riverdale. Beck also appeared on the CW series The Tomorrow People.
