= Alvin Sanders =

American-Canadian voice actor

- Citizenship: United States; Canada
- Occupations: Voice actor; voice director
- Years active: 1972–present

Alvin Sanders is an American-Canadian voice actor and voice director. He currently sits on the Union of BC Performers executive board.

== Filmography ==
=== Animated ===
==== Anime roles ====
- Dragon Ball Z – Mr Popo, Additional Voices (1996–1997)
- Hello Carbot – Guard
- InuYasha – Manten
- Master Keaton – Eugen Hart
- Night Warriors: Darkstalkers' Revenge – Jon Talbain
- Transformers: Armada – Demolishor
- Transformers: Energon – Demolishor

==== Non-anime roles ====
- Camp Candy – Additional Voices
- Captain N: The Game Master – Additional Voices
- Class of the Titans – David Johnson
- Exosquad – Captain Avery F. Butler
- Fantastic Four: World's Greatest Heroes – Puppet Master
- Gadget & the Gadgetinis – General Sir
- G.I. Joe – Static Line, Stretcher
- Hurricanes – Additional Voices
- Krypto the Superdog – Eyepatch Shark, Dog Sergeant, Garbage Man, Angry Snowman, Happy Snowman
- Littlest Pet Shop – Additional Voices
- Mummies Alive! – Additional Voices
- My Little Pony: Friendship Is Magic – Deep Fluttershy (2nd voice), King Sombra (2nd voice)
- Pucca - Destiny
- The New Adventures of He-Man – Flogg, Tuskador
- The Puzzle Club Christmas Mystery
- RoboCop: Alpha Commando – Additional Voices
- Sherlock Holmes in the 22nd Century – Additional Voices
- Skysurfer Strike Force – Cybron, Nate James/Air Enforcer
- Street Sharks – Additional Voices
- X-Men: Evolution – Mirambo, Mr. Sefton
- Yvon of the Yukon – Jackie Styles

=== Live-action ===
==== Television ====
- Legends of Tomorrow – Buddy (in "The Final Frame")
- Dead Like Me – Milkman ("Nighthawks")
- Resident Alien – Lewis Thompson
- Riverdale – Pop Tate
- Stargate SG-1 – Fred ("Holiday")

==== Movies ====
- The Baby Dance – Security Officer
- Cats & Dogs – Mason Employee
- Door to Door – Shoeshine Boy
- Hot Rod – Furious Boss
- Life-Size – Guard
- Love, Guaranteed – Jerome
- Our Shining Moment – Mr. Rahill
- Romeo Must Die – Calvin the Barber
- Stealing Christmas – Cook at Dave's Cafe
- Santa Hunters – Grandpa
- The Mistletoe Promise – Honcho Willison

== Staff work ==
- Captain N: The Game Master – Recording Assistant
- Funky Fables – Additional Director
- Sugar and Spice: Heidi and Sugar & Spice: Alice in Wonderland (both 1991) – Additional Director
