= Casey Cott =

American actor (born 1992)

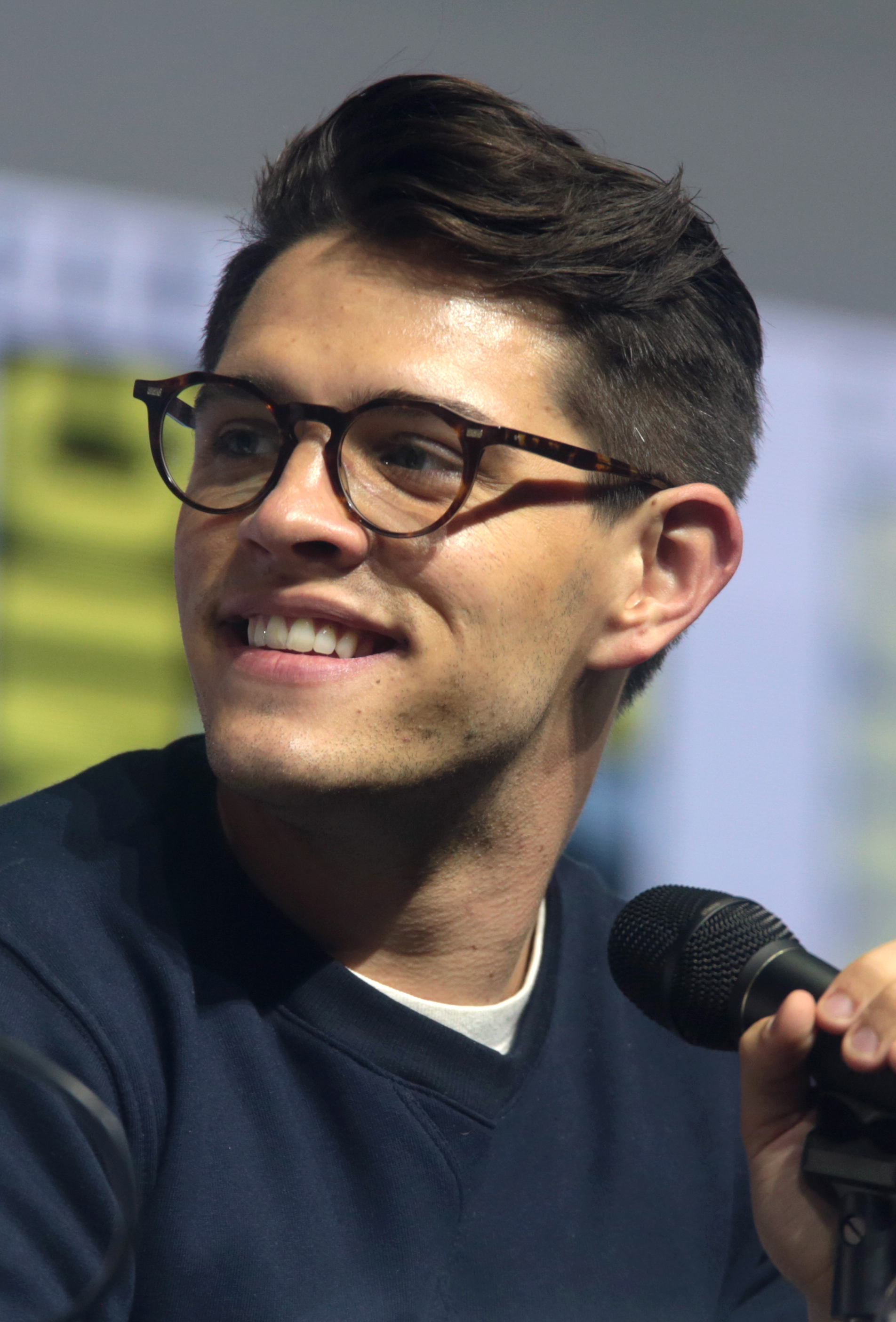
- Cott at the 2018 San Diego Comic-Con
- Born: Casey Morton Cott; August 8, 1992 (age 33); Chagrin Falls, Ohio, U.S.
- Education: Boston University; Carnegie Mellon University (BFA)
- Occupations: Actor; singer
- Years active: 2011–present
- Spouse: Nichola Basara (m. 2021)
- Children: 1
- Relatives: Corey Cott (brother)

Casey Morton Cott (born August 8, 1992) is an American actor, known for his role as Kevin Keller on The CW series Riverdale.

== Early life and education ==
Cott was born in 1992, the middle of three children of Rick Cott, an investment manager and former fighter pilot in the Air Force, and Lori Cott (née Morton). Cott grew up in Chagrin Falls, Ohio, with his younger sister and older brother, actor Corey Cott, and graduated from Chagrin Falls High School. He attended Boston University for two years before deciding to study acting, transferring to the Carnegie Mellon School of Drama, where he graduated in 2016.

== Career ==
Cott began his acting career performing in local Ohio theater, appearing in productions of Bloody Bloody Andrew Jackson and Romeo and Juliet, among others. Upon moving to Pittsburgh for school, he got involved in the area's regional theater scene while performing in university theater productions concurrently. He appeared in a 2014 production of the play Parade at the New Hazlett Theater in Pittsburgh, where he starred alongside several of his Carnegie Mellon classmates, as well as a production of Small Engine Repair at Barebone Productions. In August 2016, he played Moses in the premiere concert reading of Stephen Schwartz's musical project, a stage production of The Prince of Egypt, at the Bay Street Theater in Sag Harbor, New York, opposite Shuler Hensley and John Cariani.

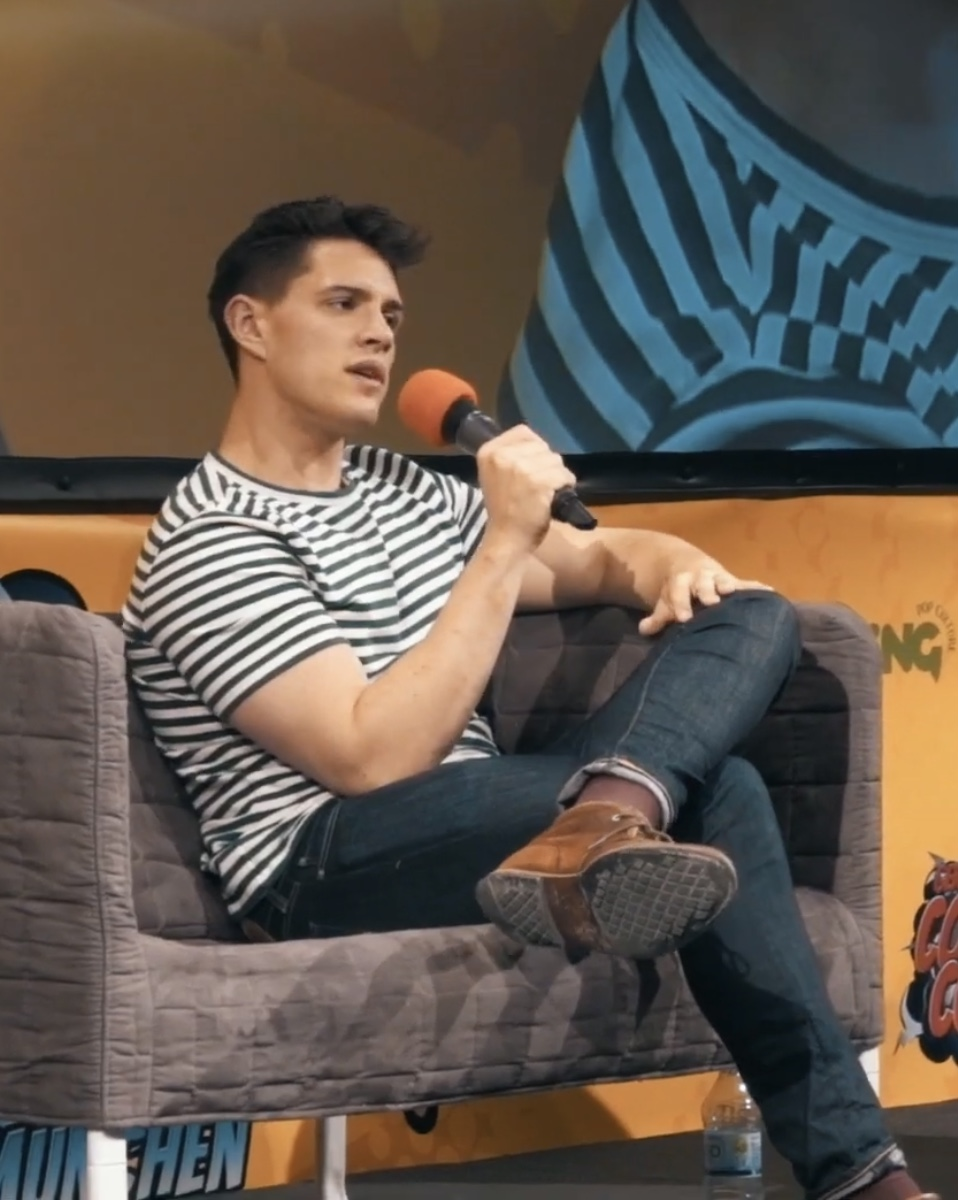
Cott in 2019

On March 12, 2016, during his final year at CMU, Cott was cast as Kevin Keller on the CW drama series Riverdale, a TV adaptation of the Archie Comics universe. The character of Kevin is notable due to his status of being the first openly gay character in the history of Archie Comics. Cott stated in a Facebook video released to fans in March 2017 that he originally auditioned for the roles of Archie Andrews and Jughead Jones, prior to landing the role of Kevin. He was promoted to a series regular for the second season. That same year, he appeared in the music video for the song "Why" by Sabrina Carpenter.

On March 12, 2018, at the SXSW Festival, Cott announced his upcoming role in the film The Mascot, written and directed by Matthew Perkins. Cott will be playing the lead role of Nick Shepherd, an ex-quarterback turned mascot. However, as of early 2019, production has stalled on the project. In the second half of 2018, Cott took part in the filming of the movie All the Little Things We Kill, in which he plays the supporting role of Trever Olsson.

In March 2019, it was announced that Cott will star as the titular character in a Kennedy Center production of The Who's Tommy, starring opposite Mandy Gonzalez and Christian Borle. It was announced on Monday 26 June 2023, Cott made his Broadway debut as Christian in Moulin Rouge! at the Al Hirschfeld Theatre, on August 1.

== Personal life ==
Cott resides in New York City. On December 19, 2020, Cott announced his engagement to his girlfriend, Nichola Basara. They were married on December 18, 2021. Cott and his wife had their first child, Cashius, on September 18, 2023.

== Filmography ==
=== Film ===
Year	Title	Role
2019	All the Little Things We Kill	Trevor Olsson
2021	Asking For It	Mike
2025	Games We Play	Jack

=== Television ===
Year	Title	Role	Notes
2017	Law & Order: Special Victims Unit	Lucas Hale	Episode: "Conversion"
2017–2023	Riverdale	Kevin Keller / Teen Tom Keller / Constable Keller / Kirk Keller / Deputy Keller / Agent Keller	Recurring role (season 1) and main role (season 2–7); 127 episodes
2018	Instinct	Dino Moretti	Episode: "Pilot"
2020	Katy Keene	Kevin Keller	Episode: "Chapter Ten: Gloria"

=== Music videos ===
Year	Title	Artist(s)	Notes
2017	"Why"	Sabrina Carpenter	
2019	"Shoes"	Mina Tobias	
