= KJ Apa =

New Zealand actor (born 1997)

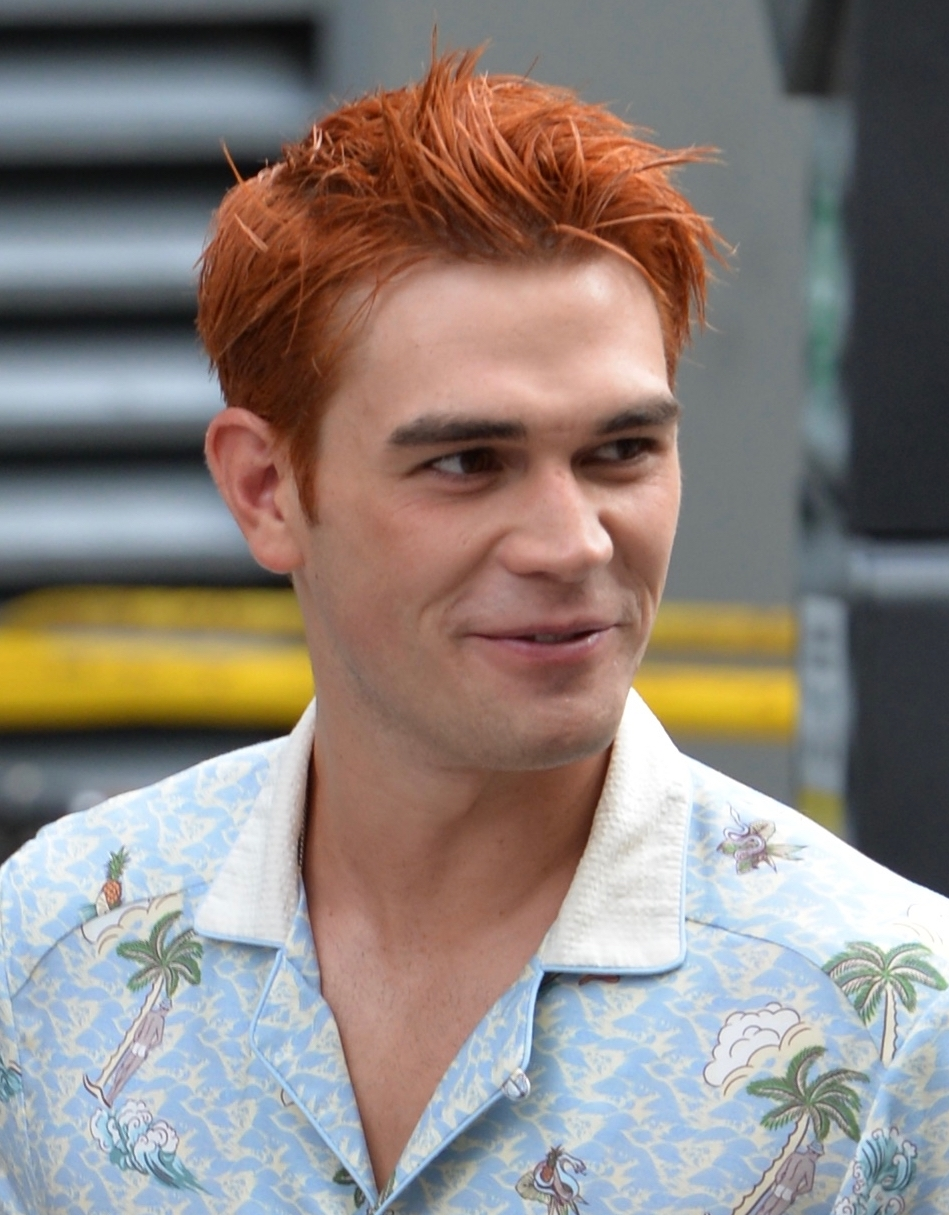
- Apa at the 2018 Toronto International Film Festival
- Born: Keneti James Fitzgerald Apa; 17 June 1997 (age 29); Auckland, New Zealand
- Occupations: Actor; singer
- Years active: 2013–present
- Partner: Clara Berry (2020–2024)
- Children: 1
- Relatives: Michael Jones (uncle)

Keneti James Fitzgerald "KJ" Apa (born 17 June 1997) is a New Zealand actor and singer. He gained recognition for playing Kane Jenkins in the New Zealand soap opera Shortland Street (2013–2015) and Archie Andrews in The CW teen drama series Riverdale (2017–2023). He has also starred in the adventure drama film A Dog's Purpose (2017), the teen drama film The Hate U Give (2018), and the biographical romantic drama film I Still Believe (2020). Apa released his debut solo album in 2021, the indie folk-rock album Clocks. He played the title role in the 2026 James Stewart biopic Jimmy.

== Early life ==
Apa was born on 17 June 1997 at Waitakere Hospital in Auckland, New Zealand, the son of Tupa'i and Tessa Apa (née Callander). His father is Samoan and a matai (chief) of his village in Samoa; his mother is a European New Zealander. His father is known as Keneti Apa, with Keneti being a Samoan rendering of "Kennedy": both Apa and his father are named after the late United States president John F. Kennedy. He has two older sisters. His uncle is former rugby union player and coach Michael Jones. Apa attended high school at King's College in Auckland before beginning his acting career.

== Career ==
From 2013 to 2015, Apa starred as Kane Jenkins in the New Zealand prime-time soap opera Shortland Street. In 2016, he was cast as Archie Andrews in The CW drama series Riverdale, after a four-month worldwide talent search.

In 2017, he starred as Ethan Montgomery in the comedy-drama film A Dog's Purpose, which was released on the same day as Riverdale premiered on television. His next film role was replacing Kian Lawley in the 2018 drama film The Hate U Give. He starred as Griffin in the Netflix film The Last Summer, which was released on 3 May 2019. He also starred as singer Jeremy Camp in the biographical romantic drama film I Still Believe, which was released in March 2020.

Apa starred in Adam Mason's critically panned 2020 thriller film Songbird, produced by Michael Bay's Platinum Dunes. The film was accused of using the COVID-19 pandemic to create a thrill plot. In May 2021, Lionsgate Films announced he would appear in a military based drama West Pointer.

In 2021, he independently released his debut album, Clocks, which explores the folk rock and indie genres. It gained some attention on Spotify and TikTok.

In early 2024, Apa hosted his first art show in Los Angeles.

In August 2025, Apa attracted attention for a TikTok based musical persona known as Mr. Fantasy. Media outlets reported that the character’s distinctive styling, comedic delivery and physical resemblance led many to speculate that Apa was behind the persona, although he has not publicly confirmed this. Mr. Fantasy released his self-titled debut single in the same month. The single charted on Spotify's Viral 50 lists in the United States and globally, and reached over 5 million streams on Spotify as of November 2025.

Coverage of the Mr. Fantasy persona sparked renewed discussion of Apa's public image. Parade, Pedestrian.TV, and The Hollywood Reporter characterised the alter ego as a comedic departure from his earlier roles, noting that its surreal style and self-aware exaggeration contrasted with the actor's established on-screen persona. Reporting also highlighted that the viral interest in the character demonstrated Apa's growing influence on short-form digital platforms.

In May 2026, with the release of the music video for Mr. Fantasy's song "Do Me Right", which featured Apa's Riverdale co-stars Camila Mendes, Lili Reinhart, and Madelaine Petsch, Apa addressed the rumours in an Instagram video by claiming that Mr. Fantasy was impersonating him, having "stolen [,,,] and misappropriated [his] image and [his] likeness."

Apa played the title role in the James Stewart biopic Jimmy, which was released on November 6, 2026. Frank Scheck of The Hollywood Reporter called his performance the film's best aspect and considered it "top-notch" and "soulful." He wrote that although Apa "doesn't resemble Stewart all that much," he "conveys his essence and aw-shucks appeal with body language and perfect vocal imitation." Pete Hammond of Deadline described his performance in Jimmy as "a nuanced and authentic portrayal that shows us a side of the iconic man who represents the best we can be."

== Personal life ==
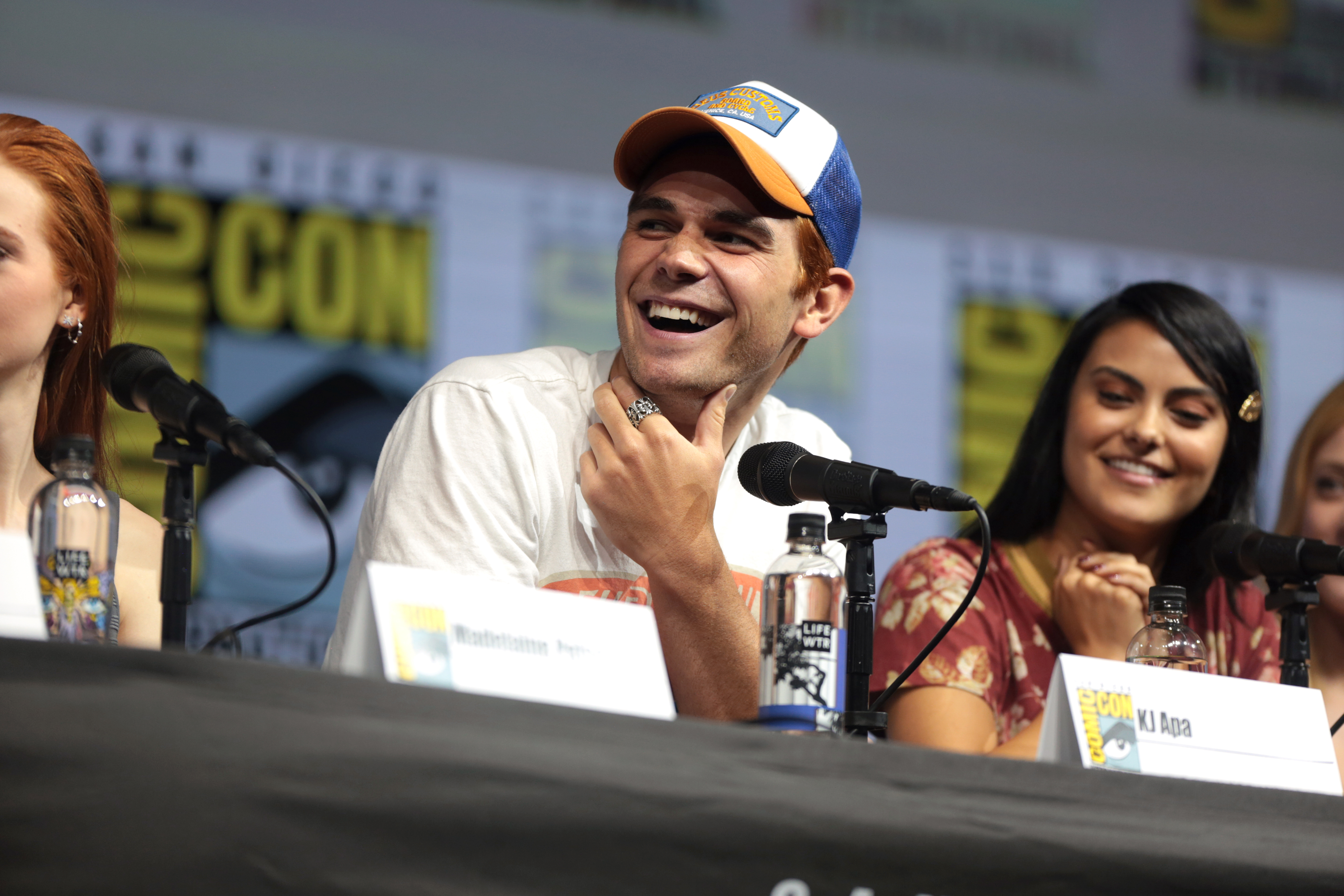
Apa at the 2018 San Diego Comic-Con with Riverdale costar Camila Mendes

Apa was involved in a minor car accident in Vancouver in September 2017, but was uninjured when the passenger side of his car hit a light pole. The late-night crash was reportedly the result of him falling asleep at the wheel after a long day of filming.

In May 2021, Apa announced that he and French model Clara Berry were expecting their first child, who was born in September 2021. On Andy Cohen's SiriusXM radio show on 14 August 2025, Apa revealed that fatherhood helped him get sober. In an interview with People, Apa said that his former Riverdale co-star Charles Melton is his son's godfather.

Apa was raised in a Christian family and has stated that he is a Christian.

In 2018, Apa criticised rugby player Israel Folau over homophobic comments the player made over Instagram.

In September 2022, he was awarded the matai title of Savae by his native village Moata'a in Samoa.

On the Wildmen podcast in July 2026, Apa discussed his struggles with substance abuse and eating disorder, particularly during his time on Riverdale. He explained that the pressure to maintain a fit physique heavily contributed to his disordered eating, which involved bingeing and purging. He also revealed that his eating disorder became so intense that he once urinated on food to stop himself from eating it, only to return again to satisfy his cravings. Apa also confirmed that he had been sober for a year and a half. Apa also spoke about how Cole Sprouse once hit him in an attempt to help him stop using drugs.

== Filmography ==
Key
†	Denotes films that have not yet been released

=== Film ===
Year	Title	Role	Notes	Ref.
2017	A Dog's Purpose	Teenage Ethan Montgomery		
2018	The Hate U Give	Chris Bryant		
2019	The Last Summer	Griffin Hourigan		
2020	I Still Believe	Jeremy Camp		
2020	Dead Reckoning	Niko		
2020	Songbird	Nico Price		
2024	One Fast Move	Wes Neal	Also executive producer	
2025	The Map That Leads to You	Jack		
2025	A Very Jonas Christmas Movie	Gene		
2026	Falling	Jack		
2026	Let's Have Kids!	Rob		
2026	Jimmy	James Stewart		
TBA	White Elephant †	TBA	Post-production	

=== Television ===
Year	Title	Role	Notes
2013–2015	Shortland Street	Kane Jenkins	Soap opera; 46 episodes
2016	The Cul de Sac	Jack	Recurring role
2017–2023	Riverdale	Archie Andrews	Main role; 137 episodes
TBA	Myron Bolitar †	Win Lockwood	Main role; filming

=== Podcasts ===
Year	Title	Voice role	Ref.
2026	The Summer Oath	Ezra	

== Discography ==
In addition to soundtrack work on Shortland Street, Riverdale, and I Still Believe, Apa has released independent music albums.

- The Third Room (2012)
- Clocks (2021)

== Awards and nominations ==
Award	Year	Category	Nominated work	Result	Ref.
MTV Movie & TV Awards	2018	Best Kiss (with Camila Mendes)	Riverdale	Nominated	
People's Choice Awards	2018	Drama TV Star of 2018	Riverdale	Nominated	
People's Choice Awards	2019	Male TV Star of 2019	Riverdale	Nominated	
People's Choice Awards	2020	Drama Movie Star of the Year	I Still Believe	Nominated	
Saturn Awards	2017	Breakthrough Performance	Riverdale	Won	
Saturn Awards	2017	Best Performance by a Younger Actor in a Television Series	Riverdale	Nominated	
Saturn Awards	2018	Best Performance by a Younger Actor in a Television Series	Riverdale	Nominated	
Saturn Awards	2019	Best Performance by a Younger Actor in a Television Series	Riverdale	Nominated	
Teen Choice Awards	2017	Choice Breakout TV Star	Riverdale	Nominated	
Teen Choice Awards	2019	Choice TV Actor Drama	Riverdale	Nominated	
Teen Choice Awards	2019	Choice Summer Movie Actor	The Last Summer	Nominated	
