= List of Riverdale characters =

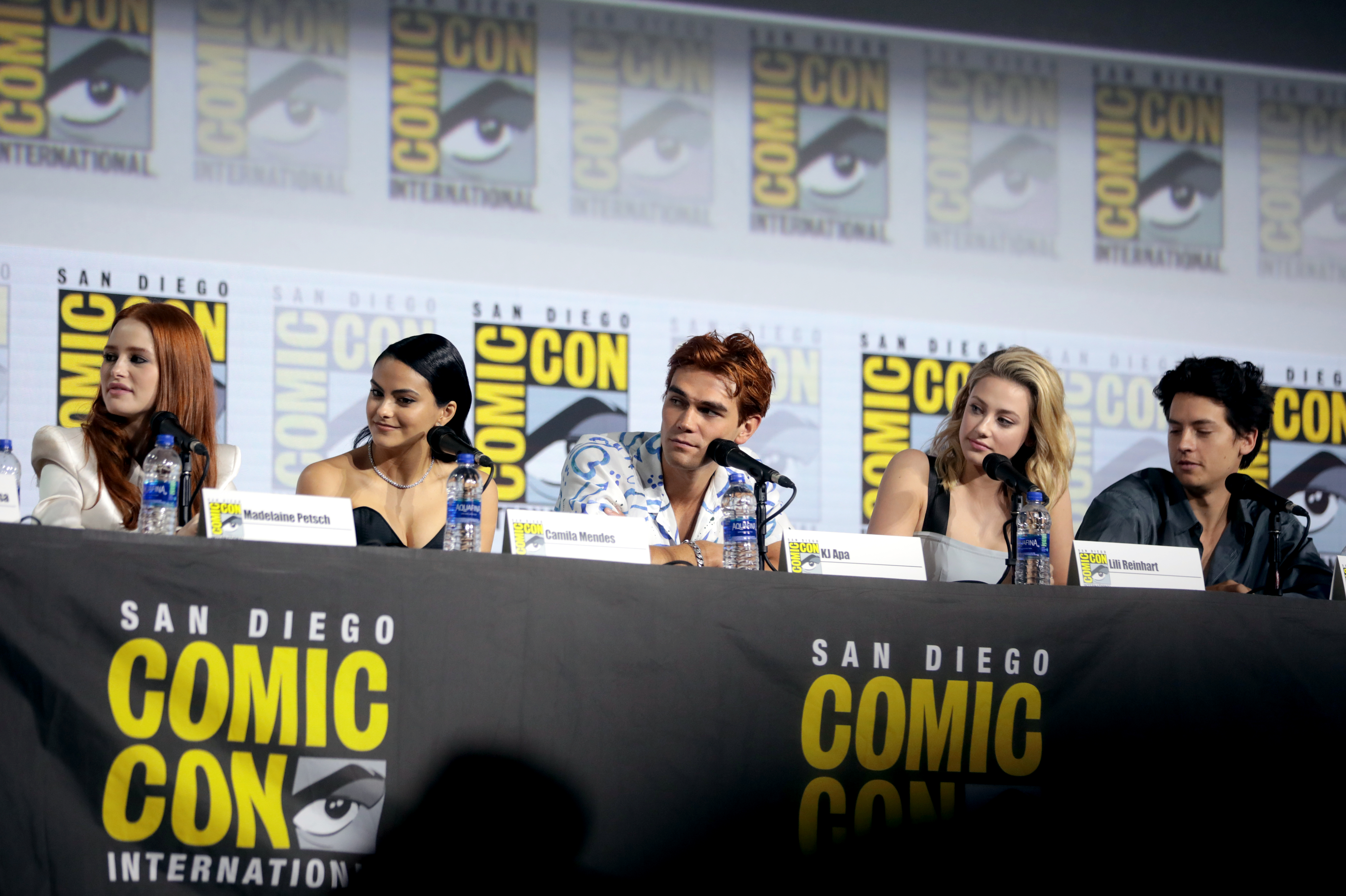
The cast of Riverdale at San Diego Comic-Con in 2019

Riverdale is an American teen drama television series based on the characters of Archie Comics, which made its debut on January 26, 2017. The series was adapted for The CW by Archie Comics' chief creative officer Roberto Aguirre-Sacasa. A spin-off, titled Katy Keene and set between the fourth and fifth seasons of Riverdale, aired from February 6, 2020, to May 14, 2020.

== Background ==
The series features an ensemble cast based on the characters from the comic series, with KJ Apa in the role of Archie Andrews; Lili Reinhart as Betty Cooper, Camila Mendes as Veronica Lodge, and Cole Sprouse as Jughead Jones. The main cast also features Madelaine Petsch as Cheryl Blossom, Ashleigh Murray as Josie McCoy, Casey Cott as Kevin Keller, Ross Butler and Charles Melton as Reggie Mantle, Vanessa Morgan as Toni Topaz, Drew Ray Tanner as Fangs Fogarty, and Erinn Westbrook as Tabitha Tate. Other main characters in the series include the parents of the main characters: Luke Perry as Fred Andrews, Mädchen Amick as Alice Cooper, Marisol Nichols and Mark Consuelos as Hermione and Hiram Lodge, respectively, and Skeet Ulrich as F. P. Jones.

== Overview ==
Key
Main cast (actor receives "Starring" credit that season)
Recurring cast (actor appears in three or more episodes that season)
Guest cast (actor appears in one or two episodes that season)

Actor	Character	Riverdale						
Actor	Character	1	2	3	4	5	6	7
Main characters
KJ Apa	Archibald "Archie" Andrews	Main	Main	Main	Main	Main	Main	Main
Lili Reinhart	Elizabeth "Betty" Cooper	Main	Main	Main	Main	Main	Main	Main
Camila Mendes	Veronica Lodge	Main	Main	Main	Main	Main	Main	Main
Cole Sprouse (Note: In season six, Cole Sprouse also portrays Nicholas "Nick" Scratch in "Chapter One Hundred and Fourteen: The Witches of Riverdale" (6.19), a character from Chilling Adventures of Sabrina.)	Forsythe "Jughead" Jones III	Main	Main	Main	Main	Main	Main	Main
Marisol Nichols	Hermione Lodge	Main (Note: In season five, Marisol Nichols is credited as a series regular until Chapter Eighty: Purgatorio (5.04). Nichols returns as a special guest star in Chapter Eighty-Eight: Citizen Lodge (5.12).)	Main	Main	Main	Main	Guest	Guest
Madelaine Petsch	Cheryl Blossom	Main	Main	Main	Main	Main	Main	Main
Ashleigh Murray	Josie McCoy	Main (Note: In season four, Ashleigh Murray is only credited as a series regular in Chapter Fifty-Eight: In Memoriam (4.01).)	Main	Main	Main	Guest		Guest
Mädchen Amick	Alice Cooper	Main	Main	Main	Main	Main	Main	Main
Luke Perry	Fred Andrews	Main	Main	Main				
Mark Consuelos	Hiram Lodge		Main	Main	Main	Main	Guest	Guest
Casey Cott	Kevin Keller	Recurring	Main	Main	Main	Main	Main	Main
Skeet Ulrich	F. P. Jones	Recurring	Main (Note: In season five, Skeet Ulrich is credited as a series regular until Chapter Seventy-Nine: Graduation (5.03).)	Main	Main	Main		
Charles Melton (Note: Ross Butler originally played the character in the show's first season. Charles Melton assumed the character's role from the second season onwards. Butler returned later as a version of Reggie from an alternate universe in Chapter One Hundred: The Jughead Paradox (6.05).)	Reggie Mantle	Recurring	Recurring	Main	Main	Main	Main	Main
Vanessa Morgan	Toni Topaz		Recurring	Main	Main	Main	Main	Main
Drew Ray Tanner	Fangs Fogarty		Recurring	Recurring	Recurring	Main	Main	Main
Erinn Westbrook	Tabitha Tate					Main (Note: In season five, Erinn Westbrook is credited as a series regular from Chapter Eighty: Purgatorio (5.04) until (7.01), then as a special guest star thereafter.)	Main	Main
Recurring characters
Martin Cummins	Tom Keller	Recurring	Recurring	Recurring	Recurring	Recurring	Recurring	Recurring
Alvin Sanders	Pop Tate	Recurring	Recurring	Recurring	Recurring	Recurring	Recurring	Recurring
Tiera Skovbye	Polly Cooper	Recurring	Recurring	Recurring	Recurring	Recurring	Recurring	Guest
Molly Ringwald	Mary Andrews	Recurring	Recurring	Recurring	Recurring	Recurring	Guest	Recurring
Nathalie Boltt	Penelope Blossom	Recurring	Recurring	Recurring	Recurring	Recurring	Guest	Recurring
Cody Kearsley	Moose Mason	Recurring	Recurring	Recurring	Recurring	Guest	Recurring	
Peter James Bryant	Waldo Weatherbee	Recurring	Recurring	Recurring	Guest	Recurring	Recurring	Guest
Lochlyn Munro	Hal Cooper	Recurring	Recurring	Recurring	Guest	Guest	Recurring	Recurring
Robin Givens	Sierra McCoy	Recurring	Recurring	Recurring	Guest	Guest		
Shannon Purser	Ethel Muggs	Recurring	Recurring	Recurring	Guest		Guest	Recurring
Major Curda	Dilton Doiley	Recurring	Recurring	Guest			Guest	Recurring
Asha Bromfield	Melody Valentine	Recurring	Recurring			Guest		
Hayley Law	Valerie Brown	Recurring	Recurring			Guest		
Jordan Calloway	Chuck Clayton	Recurring	Recurring					
Trevor Stines	Jason Blossom	Recurring	Guest	Guest	Recurring	Guest	Recurring	Guest
Tom McBeath	Smithers	Recurring	Guest	Guest	Guest	Recurring	Guest	Recurring
Barclay Hope	Clifford Blossom	Recurring	Guest		Guest		Guest	Recurring
Barclay Hope	Claudius Blossom		Recurring	Guest				
Rob Raco	Joaquin DeSantos	Recurring	Guest	Recurring				
Colin Lawrence	Floyd Clayton	Recurring	Guest		Guest			
Sarah Habel	Geraldine Grundy	Recurring	Guest				Guest	Recurring
Caitlin Mitchell-Markovitch	Ginger Lopez	Recurring						
Olivia Ryan Stern	Tina Patel	Recurring						
Barbara Wallace	Rose Blossom	Guest	Recurring	Recurring	Recurring	Recurring	Recurring	Recurring
Moses Thiessen	Ben Button	Guest	Recurring	Guest	Guest		Guest	Recurring
Scott McNeil	Tall Boy	Guest	Recurring	Guest				
Jordan Connor	Sweet Pea		Recurring	Recurring	Guest	Recurring		
Beverley Breuer	Sister Woodhouse		Recurring	Recurring				Guest
Brit Morgan	Penny Peabody		Recurring	Recurring				
Henderson Wade	Michael Minetta		Recurring	Recurring				
Hart Denton	Chic		Recurring	Guest	Guest	Guest		
Emilija Baranac	Midge Klump		Recurring	Guest				
Abby Ross	Midge Klump							Recurring
Graham Phillips	Nick St. Clair		Recurring		Guest		Guest	
Tommy Martinez	Malachai		Recurring	Guest				
Stephan Miers	Andre		Recurring					
Cameron McDonald	Joseph Svenson		Recurring					
John Behlmann	Arthur Adams		Recurring					
Julian Haig	Elio Grande		Guest	Recurring				
Trinity Likins	Jellybean Jones			Recurring	Recurring	Recurring		
Zoé De Grand Maison	Evelyn Evernever			Recurring	Recurring			Recurring
Brittany Willacy	Laura			Recurring	Recurring			
Eli Goree	Munroe "Mad Dog" Moore			Recurring	Recurring			
Nikolai Witschl	Dr. Curdle Jr.			Recurring	Guest	Recurring	Recurring	Guest
Bernadette Beck	Peaches 'N Cream			Recurring	Guest	Guest		
Chad Michael Murray	Edgar Evernever			Recurring	Guest			
Gina Gershon	Gladys Jones			Recurring				
William MacDonald	Warden Norton			Recurring				
Link Baker	Captain Golightly			Recurring				
Jonathan Whitesell	Kurtz			Recurring				
Nico Bustamante	Ricky DeSantos			Recurring				
Ryan Robbins	Frank Andrews				Recurring	Recurring	Recurring	Recurring
Marion Eisman	Doris Bell	Guest	Guest	Guest	Recurring	Recurring	Guest	Guest
Wyatt Nash	Charles Smith			Guest	Recurring	Recurring	Guest	
Mishel Prada	Hermosa Lodge				Recurring	Guest	Guest	
Sean Depner	Bret Weston Wallis				Recurring	Guest		Guest
Sarah Desjardins	Donna Sweett				Recurring	Guest		
Juan Riedinger	Dodger Dickenson				Recurring	Guest		
Sam Witwer	Mr. Chipping				Recurring			
Alex Barima	Johnathan				Recurring			
Doralynn Mui	Joan Berkeley				Recurring			
Kerr Smith	Mr. Honey				Recurring			
Malcolm Stewart	Francis Dupont				Recurring			
Malcolm Stewart	Fredreich Werthers							Recurring
Greyston Holt	Glen Scot					Recurring	Recurring	Guest
Kyra Leroux	Britta Beach					Recurring	Recurring	
Alix West Lefler	Juniper Cooper					Recurring	Recurring	
Bentley Storteboom	Dagwood Cooper					Recurring	Recurring	
Sommer Carbuccia	Eric Jackson					Recurring		
Chris Mason	Chad Gekko					Recurring		
Adeline Rudolph	Minerva Marble					Recurring		
Phoebe Miu	Jessica					Recurring		
John Prowse	Old Man Dreyfus					Recurring		
Alaina Huffman	Twyla Twist						Recurring	Recurring
Alison Araya	Ms. Weiss	Guest	Guest	Guest	Guest	Guest	Recurring	
Matthew Yang King	Marty Mantle			Guest	Guest	Guest	Recurring	
Andres Soto	Carlos				Guest		Recurring	
Christopher O'Shea	Percival Pickins						Recurring	
Quinnie Vu	Agent Marsha Lin						Recurring	
Ricardo Hoyos	Heraldo						Recurring	
Caroline Day	Heather						Recurring	
Sophia Tatum	Agent Drake						Recurring	
Douglas Chapman	Trash Bag Killer / Dennis						Recurring	
Oliver Rice	Lou Cypher						Recurring	
Will Jackson	Anthony Fogarty						Recurring	
Nicholas Barasch	Julian Blossom							Recurring
Karl Walcott	Clay Walker							Recurring
Guest characters
Bruce Blain	Vic	Guest	Guest	Guest	Guest			
Arabella Bushnell	Aunt Cricket	Guest	Guest		Guest	Guest		
Alex Zahara	Uncle Bedford	Guest	Guest		Guest			
Mackenzie Gray	Dr. Curdle	Guest	Guest					
Reese Alexander	Myles McCoy	Guest		Guest		Guest		
Sam Spear	Deputy	Guest		Guest				
Sheila Tyson	Delores		Guest	Guest	Guest	Guest		
Chris Britton	Judge Britton		Guest	Guest	Guest			
Azura Skye	Darla Dickeson		Guest		Guest	Guest	Guest	
Luvia Petersen	Brooke			Guest	Guest	Guest		Guest
Fred Henderson	Governor Dooley			Guest	Guest	Guest		
Kett Turton	David				Guest	Guest		
Lucy Hale	Katy Keene				Guest	Guest		
Blake Stadel	George Augustine				Guest	Guest		
Shannen Doherty	Stranded Motorist				Guest			
Ty Wood	Billy Marlin				Guest			
Timothy Webber	Forsythe Pendleton Jones I				Guest			
Zane Holtz	K.O. Kelly					Guest	Guest	
Camille Hyde	Alexandra "Xandra" Cabot					Guest	Guest	
Ryan Faucett	Bernardo Bixby					Guest		
Kiernan Shipka	Sabrina Spellman						Guest	

== Family tree ==
Riverdale family tree

Harrison Blossom	Great-Grandma Blossom	Great-Grandpa Blossom	Great-Grandma Cooper	Great-Grandpa Cooper (né Blossom)
Rose Blossom	Grandpa Blossom
Bedford Blossom	Cricket Blossom	Grandma Cooper	Grandpa Cooper	Unnamed Mother	Forsythe Pendleton Jones I
Claudius Blossom	Clifford Blossom	Penelope Blossom	Hal Cooper	Alice Smith	FP Jones	Gladys Jones
Toni Topaz	Cheryl Blossom	Charles Smith
Jason Blossom	Polly Cooper	Jellybean Jones
Juniper	Dagwood	Frank Andrews
Unnamed Mother	Hiram Lodge	Hermione Lodge	Fred Andrews	Mary Maiden
Hermosa Lodge	Veronica Lodge	Archie Andrews	Betty Cooper	Jughead Jones

== Main characters ==
=== Archie Andrews ===
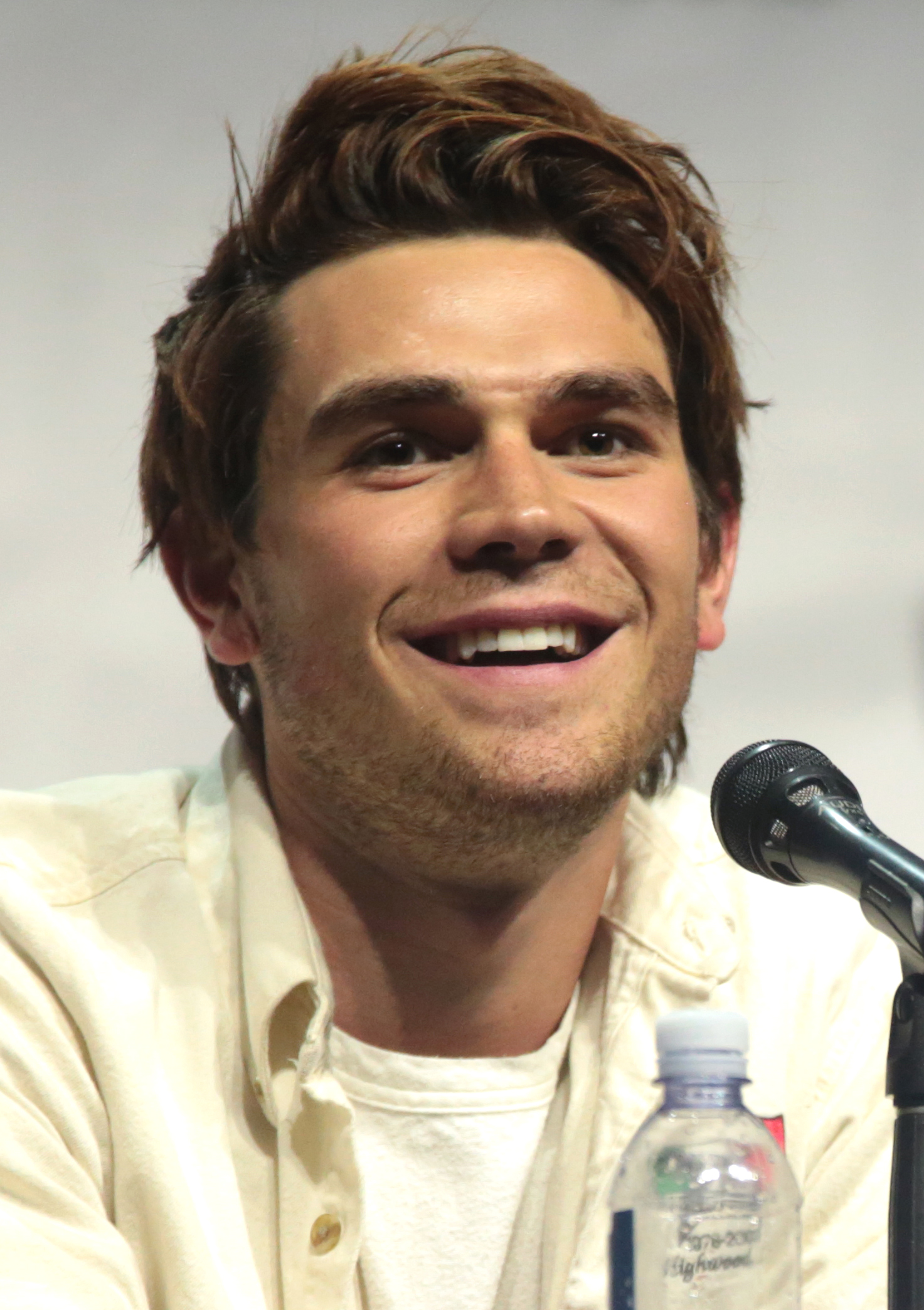
KJ Apa

Archibald "Archie" Andrews (portrayed by KJ Apa) is an intense and conflicted teenager, a high school sophomore who got in shape over the summer and now has to manage the newfound attention of his classmates. He struggles to balance his social life with his passion for writing and performing music, against the wishes of his father and his football coach.

In the first season Archie's plots center on a secret love affair with his teacher, Mrs. Grundy; while he must choose his between his music and football but must also save the family business while pursuing the love of Veronica Lodge. In the second season he begins facing the tragedy of the shooting of his father and therefore orchestrates the creation of the "Red Circle" to protect Riverdale from Black Hood, then ends up approaching Betty to end him. Later he must join the Lodge family mafia so that Hiram Lodge approves his relationship with Veronica but everything ends badly and Archie ends up framed for murder. In season 3 he faces trial for murder and is sent to the Leopord Juvenile Detention Center where he is rescued by his friends and leaves Riverdale temporarily. Finally he returns and becomes romantically linked to Josie McCoy and focuses again on his music but is involved in the game "Griffins and Gargoyles" where he is "The Red Paladin" and the mission is to assassinate him, but he eventually fights for his life and survives. Later opens a boxing gym "El Royale Fight Club" to become a boxer. In season 4, he goes through the great pain of his father's death, while Riverdale is watched by "The Author" because his uncle Frank arrives in town to accompany him in his final year. Archie is part of the cover-up of the "death of Jughead", there his role is to pretend to be the support of Betty started a false romance with her but this awakened the old feelings of both causing a rapprochement between them. In season 5 he graduates, enlists in the army and after 5 years returns to Riverdale and sets out to revive and save the town from the hands of Hiram Lodge, in the process begins a formal romance with Betty. Hiram plants a bomb under their beds and it explodes soon after.

In season 6, the bomb sends them to a timeline where they have powers, Archie becomes the toughest man in the world being unbreakable while focusing on forming a family with Betty but Percival murders him along with others but Cheryl (now a witch) manages to revive him and together with the gang they end him. He finally proposes to Betty; however, Bailey's Comet was expected to explode in Riverdale.

In season 7, he is sent to 1955 to survive Bailey's Comet but does not remember his previous lives. There he meets Veronica again with whom he falls in love, then dates Cheryl, forges a great friendship with Reggie and Kevin. He finally remembers his life. Years later, 86-year-old Betty reveals that they along with Jughead and Veronica decided to explore all their feelings and became a romantic quartet and then Archie moved to Los Angeles with his construction team, where he became a contractor and amateur writer. He never returned to Riverdale, since in the city he met a woman with whom he fell in love and with whom he formed a family. When he died he asked that he be buried next to his father in his hometown.

=== Betty Cooper ===
Elizabeth "Betty" Cooper (portrayed by Lili Reinhart) is sweet, studious, eager-to-please and wholesome as apple pie with a huge crush on her longtime best friend, Archie. Tired of being the perfect daughter, student, sister, etc., she turns to her new friend, Veronica, for life advice — much to the consternation of her emotionally brittle mother.

In the first season, we are introduced to Betty, who has intentions to stop suppressing her love feelings for Archie, while seeking to revive Riverdale High School's newspaper, The Blue and Gold. On the other hand, he investigates and solves Jason Blossom's seine, the disappearance of Polly Cooper and the secrets of Miss Grundy situations that connect her directly with Jughead and develop feelings for him. In season 2, after the arrival of Black Hood she becomes his nexus and main victim being stalked. Determined to solve it, she does anything to strip naked for the crowd to get the membership of the snakes, she teams up with Archie to take down Black Hood but ends up awakening her old crush but in turn must deal with the appearance of Chic, her supposed half-brother. He discovers that his father is Black Hood and manages to stop him. In season 3, she participates in the rescue of Archie, then investigates the suicide game led by King Gargoyle situation that keys to be interned in the Sisters of Silent Mercy there she discovers the truth about King Gargoyle being Chic with the help of her Hal Cooper (Black Hood) which are led by Penelope Blossom who forces her to kill her father but does.

=== Veronica Lodge ===
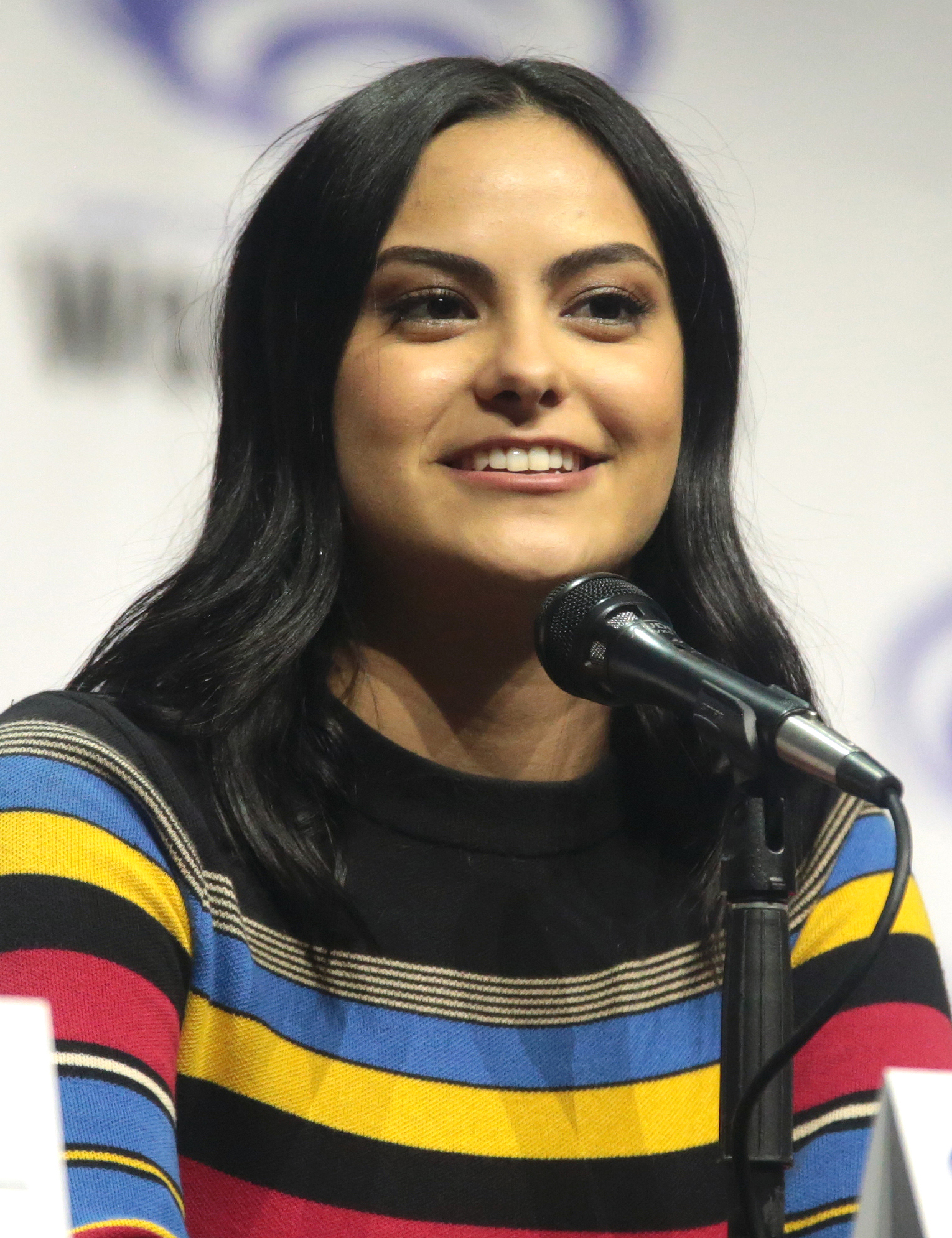
Camila Mendes

Veronica Cecilia Lodge (Luna) (portrayed by Camila Mendes) is the daughter of Hiram and Hermione Lodge. She is the girlfriend of Archie Andrews and the ex-girlfriend of Reggie Mantle and wife of Reggie Mantle (In Rivervale).

Veronica is a student at Riverdale High School. In addition, she is a member of the River Vixens and Josie and the pussycats. She moved from New York to her mother's hometown of Riverdale due to her father's arrest and subsequent incarceration. She arrives in Riverdale in order to start over and leave her troubled past behind. While living in New York, Veronica was filthy rich, popular, and fashionable. She was also a bully and a mean girl. After her father is arrested, she and her mother Hermione are forced to flee New York City and relocate to Riverdale. She struggles to find the truth behind her father's loyalties and intentions, as she fears what will happen once he is released from prison and back home with them. Meanwhile, she is also trying to reform herself into a better person. She eventually develops friendships with all of the main characters including Betty Cooper, Jughead Jones, Josie McCoy, Cheryl Blossom and Kevin Keller. She becomes Archie Andrews' girlfriend and later on, Reggie Mantle's girlfriend. In season 2, Veronica's father Hiram is released from jail and moves back to Riverdale to join Hermione and Veronica as a family. After Hiram is released, Veronica gets involved in the Lodge family business. However, with time, she turns against her father and finally realizes what a horrible person he is despite constantly having blind faith in him the entire time. She is now an adversary to her father and spent the majority of the third season taking her father down and successfully having him put in prison for all of the crimes he has committed in Riverdale. Though believed to have been the only child of her father Hiram, it's later on revealed that she has an older paternal half-sister named Hermosa Lodge, who made her first appearance in the fourth season.

=== Jughead Jones ===
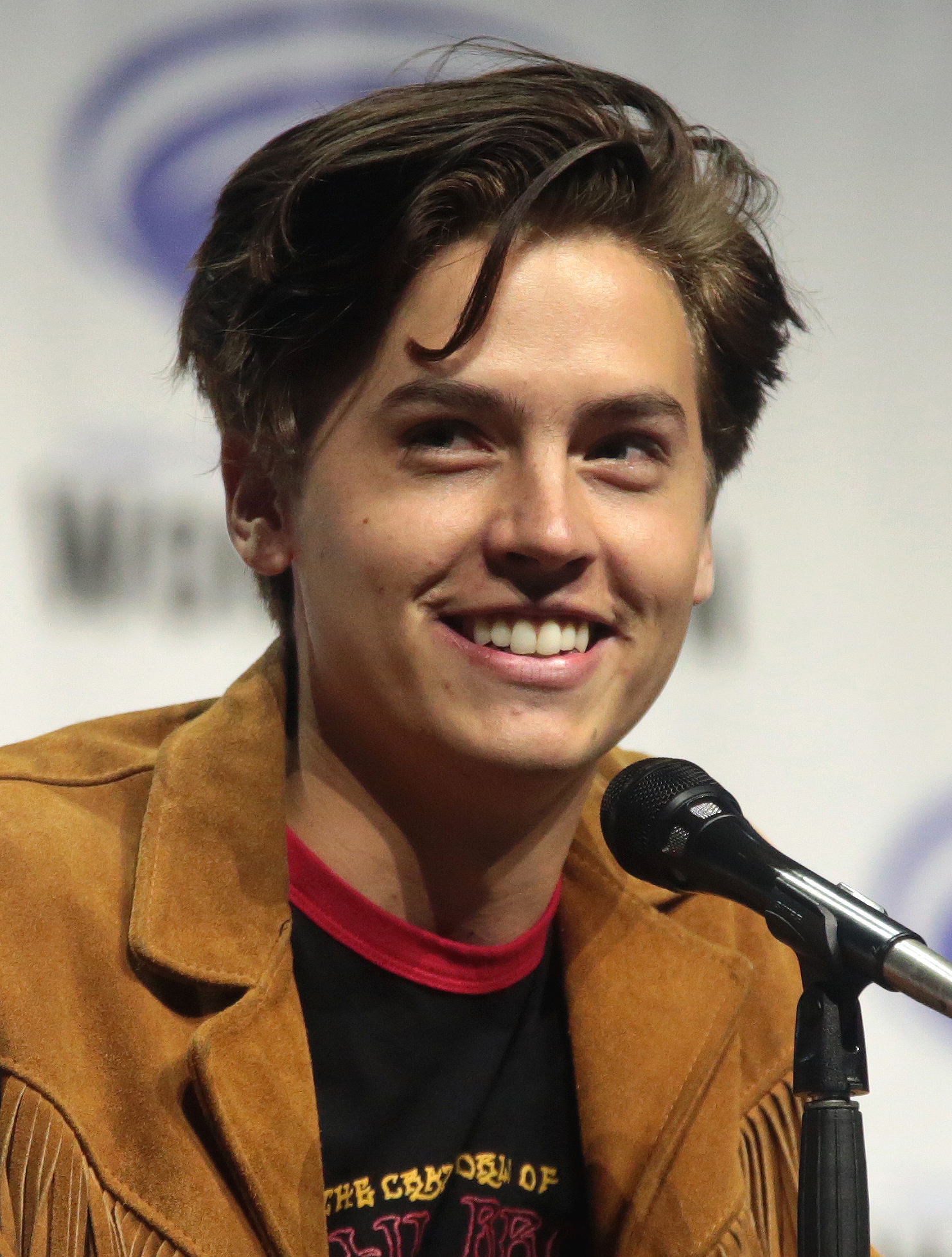
Cole Sprouse

Forsythe Pendleton "Jughead" Jones III (portrayed by Cole Sprouse) is the son of F.P. and Gladys Jones, half-brother of Charles Smith, older brother of Jellybean Jones and the boyfriend of Betty Cooper.

Jughead was a sophomore at Riverdale High School, he started investigating the murder of Jason Blossom with Betty Cooper and later on becomes her boyfriend, but after the arrest of his father, F. P. Jones, the leader of the Southside Serpents, he was placed into foster care and had to transfer to Southside High. While attending the gang and drug-infested high school, he re-opened the school newspaper, The Red and Black, where he was an editor, alongside new recruit, Toni Topaz, the newspaper's photographer, with Robert Phillips, their adviser until his arrest. However, with the closing of Southside High, Jughead has returned to Riverdale High. He is a close friend of Archie Andrews and Betty Cooper. He is also a member of the Southside Serpents, which he joined following his father's arrest, despite being advised against it.

=== Cheryl Blossom ===
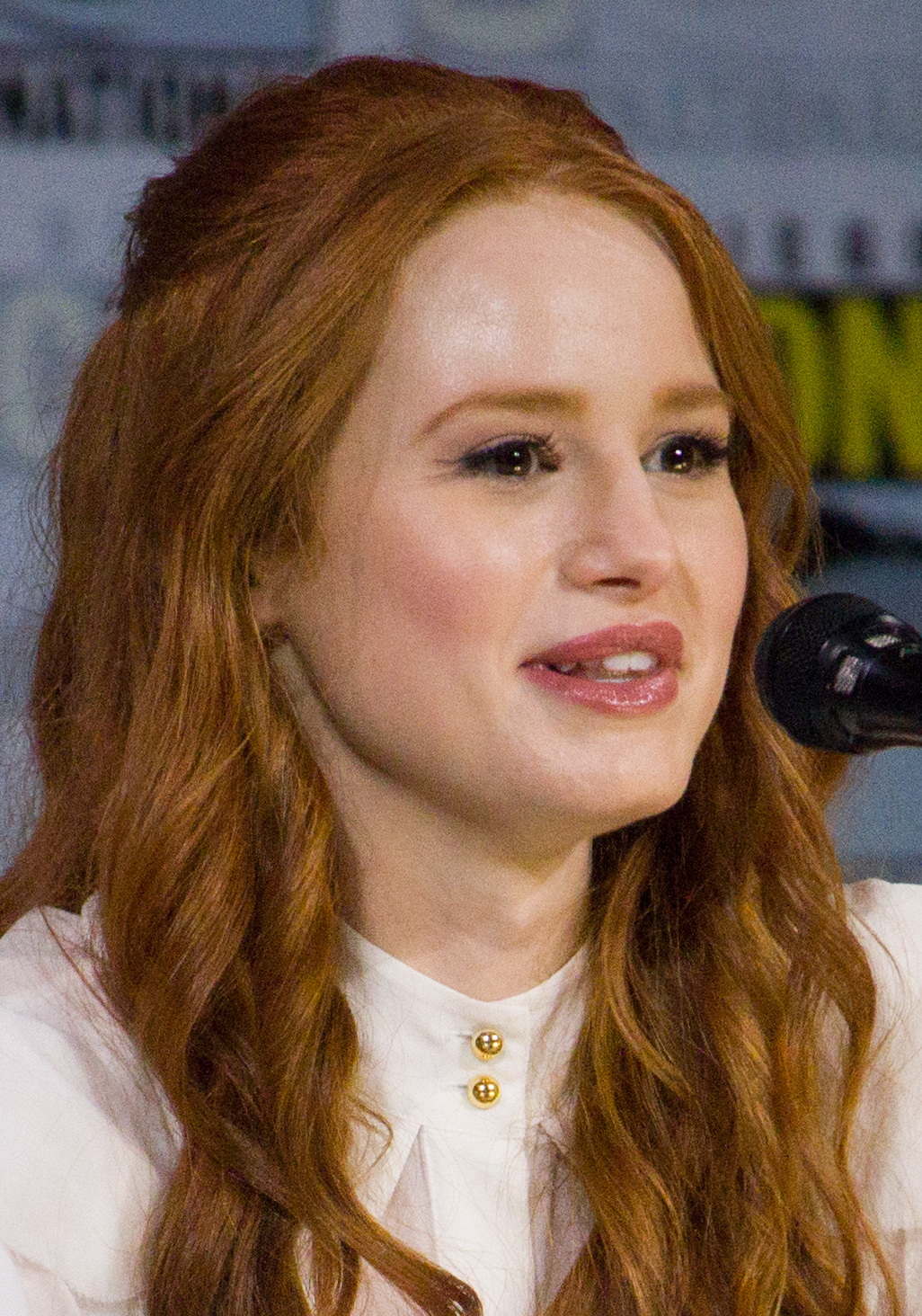
Madelaine Petsch

Cheryl Marjorie Blossom (portrayed by Madelaine Petsch) is the daughter of Clifford and Penelope Blossom, twin sister of Jason Blossom, and the aunt to Jason and Polly's twin babies. She eventually marries Toni Topaz and has a son with her.

Cheryl is a popular student at Riverdale High School, head cheerleader of the River Vixens and the self-proclaimed Queen Bee. Her life is turned upside down when her twin brother Jason is murdered, and her family's secrets are exposed in the investigation, including their drug business that ultimately led her father to kill Jason. Cheryl puts on a brave face and icy exterior to hide the fact that her parents abuse her, but it thaws throughout the series as she gains freedom from her mother and embraces who she really is. In season 2, it's revealed that Cheryl is a lesbian, and that her mother told her at a young age that her feelings were deviant. She meets Toni Topaz, who assures her that there's nothing wrong with her sexuality, and the two date and live together until graduation, when they break up because Cheryl feels she needs to atone for her family's many sins.

In Season 5, Cheryl spends the seven years after graduation being a recluse in her family's mansion, Thornhill, because she believes she's cursed. She's eventually coaxed out by Toni, and while the two still have feelings for each other, too much miscommunication and drama keeps them apart. Instead, Cheryl joins her mother's ministry, and finds a sense of purpose in worshiping the elements. In Season 6, Cheryl learns that she's a witch and develops the power of pyrokinesis. She reconnects with her childhood crush Heather, who helps her develop and understand her new abilities, and in turn, Cheryl is able to help all of her friends when they come to her for answers and assistance with their own new powers. At the end of the season, Heather tells her that she and Toni are soulmates fated to end up together, before she absorbs the other characters' powers and attempts to melt Bailey's Comet before it can strike and destroy Riverdale.

In Season 7, after she fails to melt the comet, Cheryl is sent back in 1955, where she's a teenager again with no memories of her life. She lives at home with her abusive parents again, her twin is alive, but is now Julian Blossom, and she's back in the closet. To hide her sexuality, she attempts to date Archie for a brief period, but she can't deny her feelings for Toni for long, and eventually the two begin to date again. Cheryl spends much of the season battling the homophobia, racism and other injustices of the time, while exposing her parents as Russian spies with the help of Jughead. Cheryl eventually regains her memories of the future, but she must stay in the past. She ends up moving to California with Toni, where she's a successful painter and an activist. They get married and have a son named Dale. She dies peacefully after living a full life.

=== Hermione Lodge ===
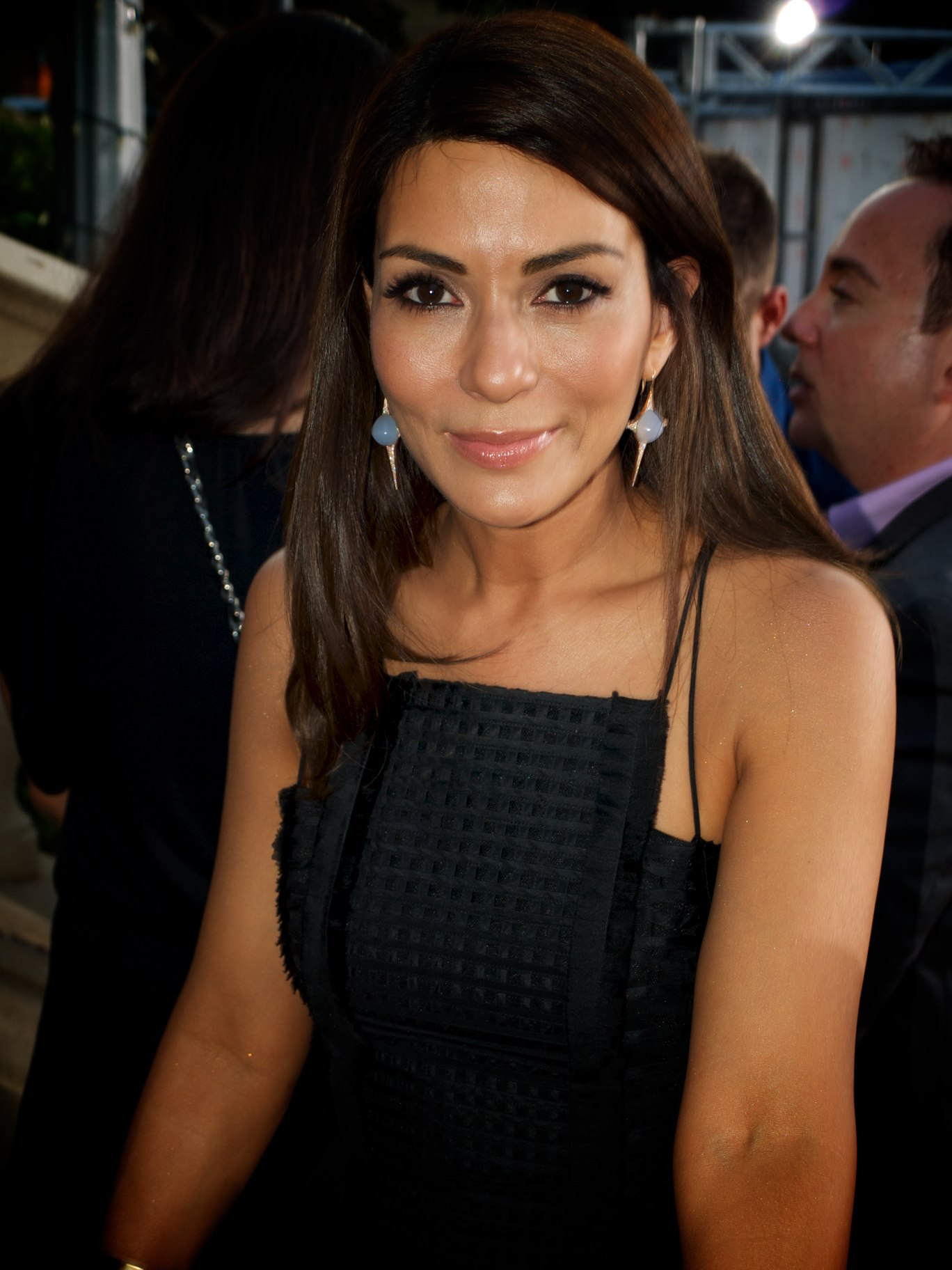
Marisol Nichols

Hermione Apollonia Lodge (née Gomez) (portrayed by Marisol Nichols) is the ex-wife of Hiram Lodge and the mother of Veronica Lodge.

Hermione grew up in Riverdale and she came from a poor, working class Latino family. During that time, she would date Fred Andrews. However, she found herself drawn and attracted to Hiram Lodge, the wealthy boy whom her mother didn't approve of her dating because she felt he was a scrub and not decent for her daughter despite his wealth. Hermione found herself in a love triangle with Fred and Hiram in high school, but in the end, she ultimately chose Hiram over Fred. Throughout her high school years, Hermione worked at local businesses such as the Bijou and Spiffany's. During her youth, some would have described Hermione as a mean girl, but flashbacks suggest that she was a rebelling Catholic girl who wore glasses and a Catholic school girl uniform. She even believes her current misfortune was karma finally catching up to her. After she broke up with Fred, she married Hiram Lodge and the two moved to New York City. Together they had a daughter, Veronica. After Hiram was arrested for fraud and embezzlement, Hermione and Veronica fled New York City and moved back to Riverdale. After the scandal, the only remaining property that was not seized because it was in Hermione's name was the luxurious apartment building, the Pembrooke, where she resides with her husband and daughter. In season 2, Hermione runs for Mayor of Riverdale. She ends up winning the election, beating out Fred Andrews by a smidge. As of season 2, she is the current mayor of Riverdale. In season 3, Hermione appoints FP Jones as the Sheriff of Riverdale after hiring FP to shoot Hiram.

=== Josie McCoy ===
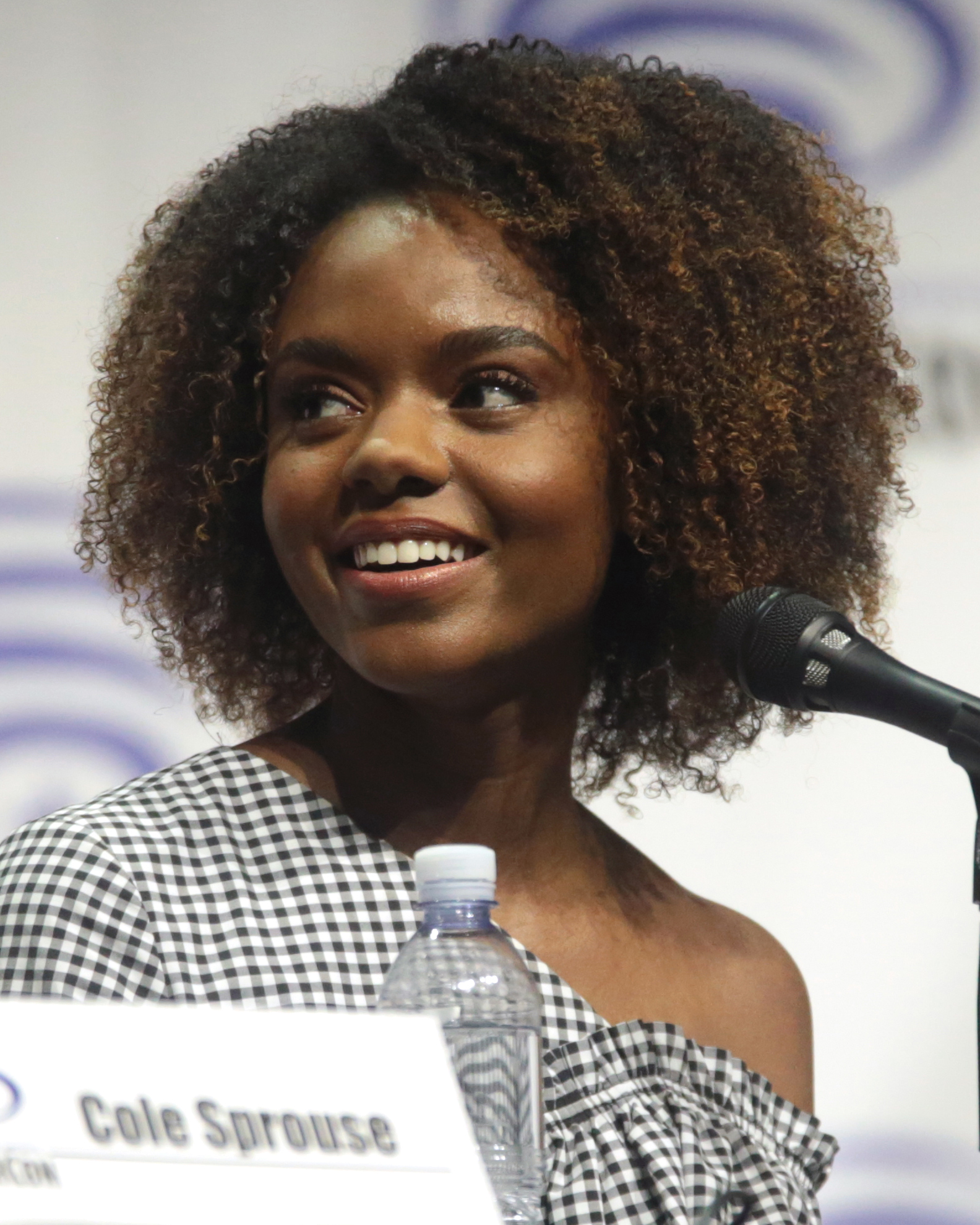
Ashleigh Murray

Josephine "Josie" McCoy (portrayed by Ashleigh Murray) is the daughter of Myles and Sierra McCoy.

Josie is a student at Riverdale High School and was both the lead singer and guitarist of her band, Josie and the Pussycats. After she secretly made the decision to pursue a solo career, Valerie Brown and Melody Valentine disbanded the group. Her father, who was a man of music, gave her the name Josephine, after the late singer Josephine Baker. Because of this, she often struggles to gain his approval while also trying to impress him. Unlike her father, Josie's mother Sierra is far more encouraging of her talents, especially her band and music. They both enforce "black excellence", especially when the choice of the band members are concerned.

=== Alice Cooper ===
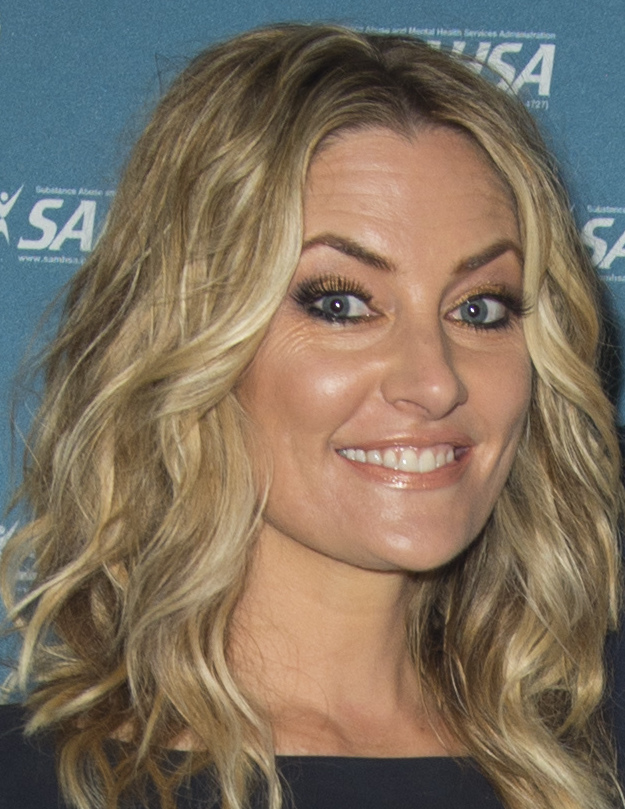
Mädchen Amick

Alice Susanna Cooper (née Smith) (portrayed by Mädchen Amick) is the ex-wife of Hal Cooper, mother of Charles Smith, Betty, and Polly Cooper, the grandmother of Jason and Polly's twin babies and the editor and co-owner of the local newspaper The Riverdale Register.

Alice grew up on the south side of Riverdale and attended the local high school with Hermione Lodge, Fred Andrews, FP Jones, Penelope Blossom, Hal Cooper, Hiram Lodge, Mary Andrews, Tom Keller and Sierra McKoy.

=== Fred Andrews ===
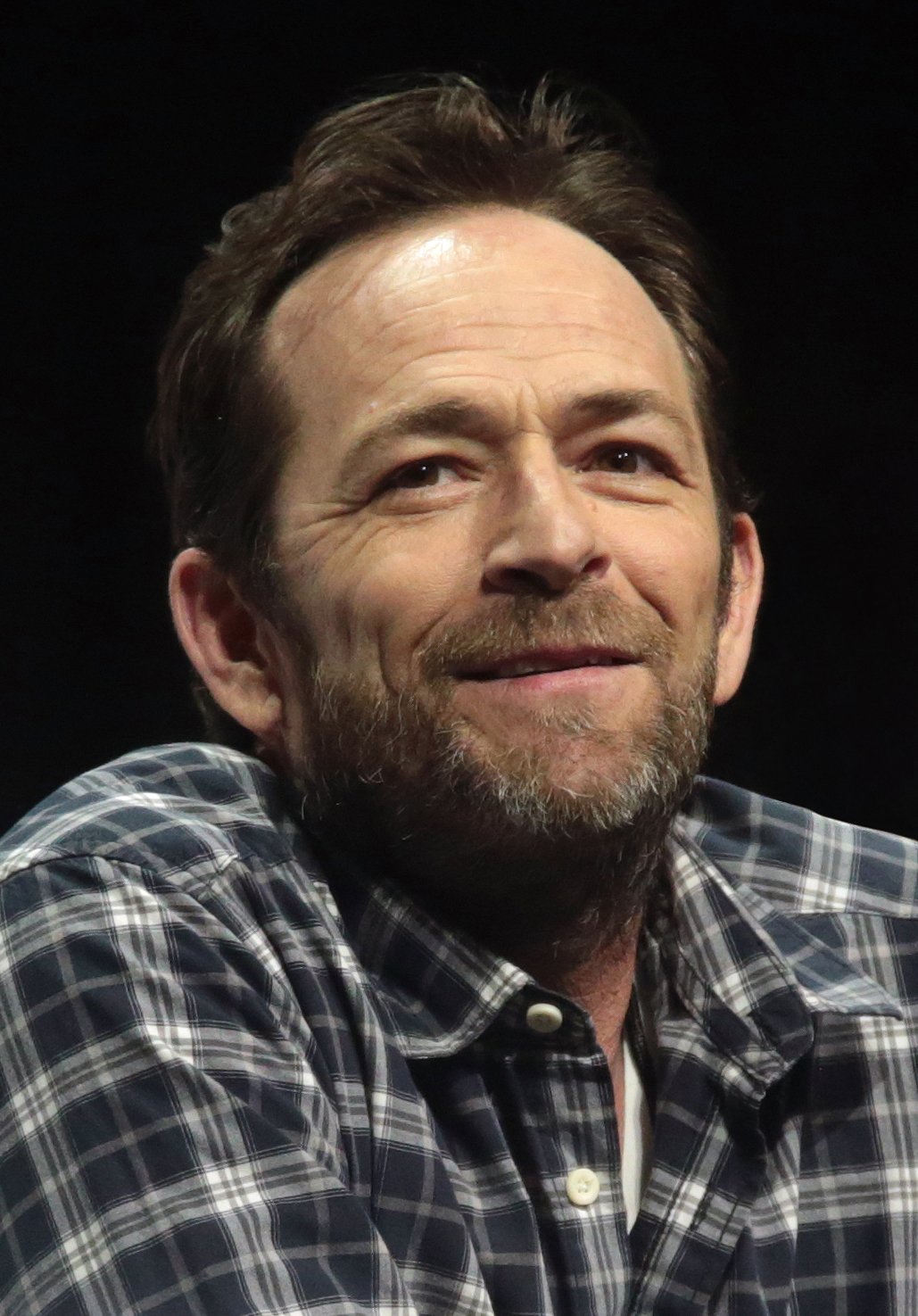
Luke Perry

Frederick Arthur "Fred" Andrews (portrayed by Luke Perry) was the ex-husband of Mary Andrews, father of Archie Andrews and the owner of Andrews Construction.

Fred was raised in Riverdale, and like his son, attended the local high school, where he was close friends with F. P. Jones, Alice Cooper, Hermione Lodge, Penelope Blossom, Hal Cooper, Hiram Lodge, Mary Andrews, Tom Keller and Sierra McKoy, and briefly dated Hermione until she chose the rich kid, Hiram over him. During those high school years, Fred and F. P. spent an entire summer fixing up an old DW bus, which they later came to called "The Shaggin' Wagon". Following that, he and F. P. formed a band their senior year, which they named "The Fred Heads". Apparently, this attracted the attention of a lot of ladies for Fred. He later went on to marry Mary Andrews and she would give birth to their first and only child, Archie Andrews. However, that did not last. He and Mary separated, which was not amicable as the two had trouble being in the same room together without a mediator present and Mary moved away to Chicago.

Luke Perry died of a stroke in March 2019, and as a result Fred Andrews died in a hit-and-run while assisting a stranger.

=== Hiram Lodge ===
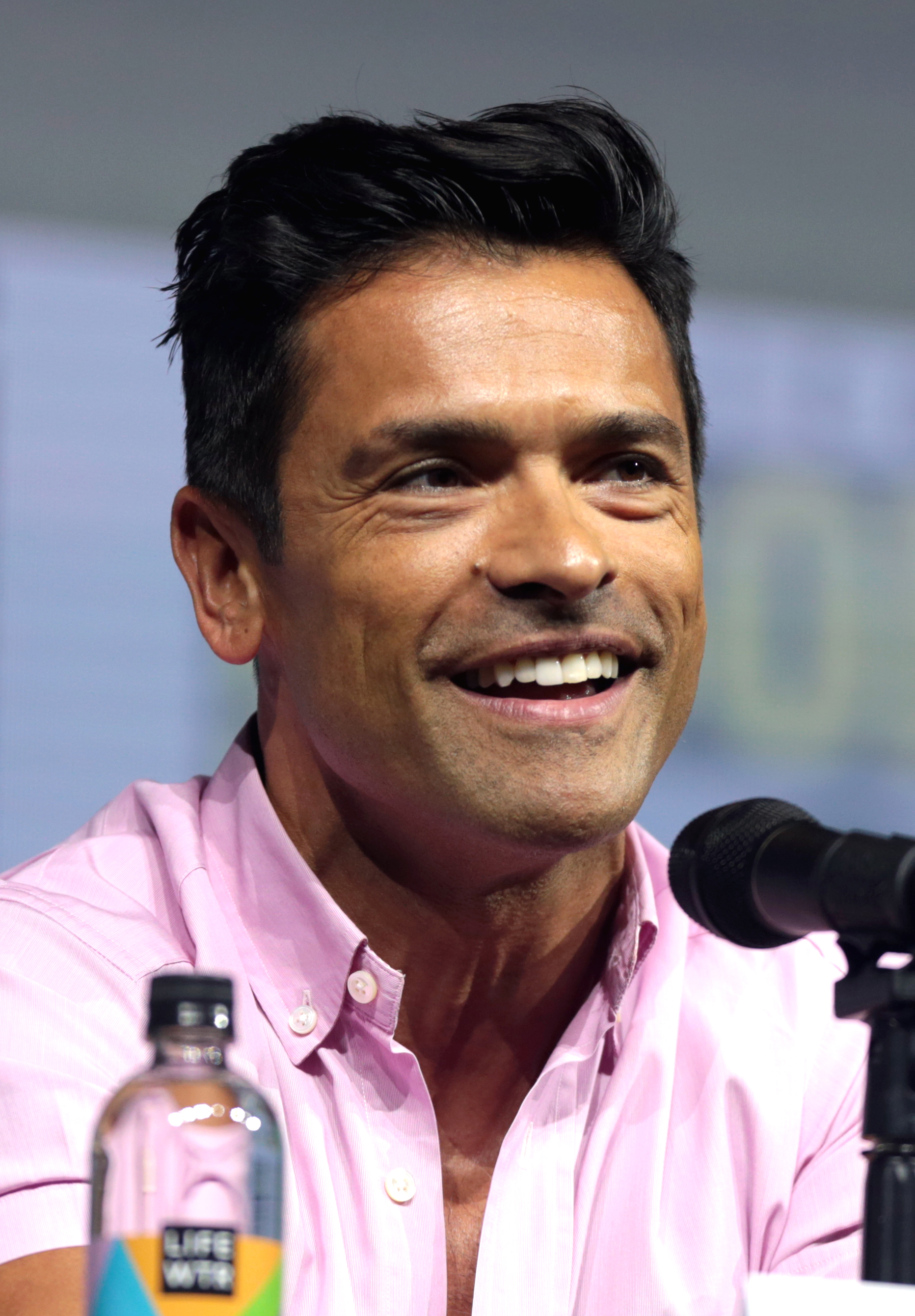
Mark Consuelos

Hiram Lodge (born Jaime Luna) (portrayed by Mark Consuelos) is the ex-husband of Hermione Lodge, father of Hermosa and Veronica Lodge and the CEO and President of Lodge Industries.

Hiram supposedly grew up in Riverdale, where he was known as the filthy rich kid. During this time, he dated Hermione Gomez, who broke up with Fred Andrews to be with him. Along with building a relationship with Hermione, he forged a rivalry with Clifford Blossom during his high school years. It was later revealed that while attending Riverdale High School, Hiram was the wrestling state champion, earning him a trophy for his great achievement. After graduating, he and Hermione moved to New York City, and some time later got married and had a daughter, Veronica, and they all lived together in New York living a wealthy, luxurious lifestyle. However, their fancy life and luxurious living did not last forever as Hiram was arrested for fraud and embezzlement. Despite his imprisonment, Hiram still ran his businesses and criminal empire from behind bars. He has been released from prison and has now taken up residence at the Pembrooke in Riverdale with his wife and daughter. Since his release, he has secretly purchased Pop's Chock'lit Shoppe, hiring Pop Tate as manager in exchange for his silence. Hiram is also business partners with Fred Andrews, working on the SoDale project together, an arrangement that was put in place by Hermione, in an effort to legitimize Lodge Industries. He has also taken over Riverdale by purchasing all of the businesses and lands within the town, including Southside High (which he had intended to use to build his for profit prison), the Riverdale Register, and Sunnyside Trailer Park just to name a few. He also intended to have Fred Andrews run for Mayor of Riverdale but when he declined to run under the Lodge's request, he had his wife Hermione run for Mayor instead. Hiram's intention of having Hermione run for Mayor was so that he could have complete control over Riverdale with an iron fist. Hiram continues to operate his devious schemes and have control over Riverdale until eventually, it all comes crashing down in season three. Hiram ends up being arrested by Sheriff FP Jones and he is imprisoned in the very prison that he built and becomes its first inmate. Despite being in prison, Hiram is still able to manipulate things to his own accord as he had Hermione arrested by the FBI to get back at her and Veronica for betraying him. In addition to being a very wealthy, powerful business man, Hiram is also a crime boss and a drug lord. Throughout season 2 and 3, Hiram has successfully been peddling Fizzle Rocks and Jingle Jangle throughout Riverdale. In season 4, it is revealed that Hiram has another daughter named Hermosa Lodge whom he has kept hidden and secret.

Consuelos joined the series in the second season.

=== Kevin Keller ===
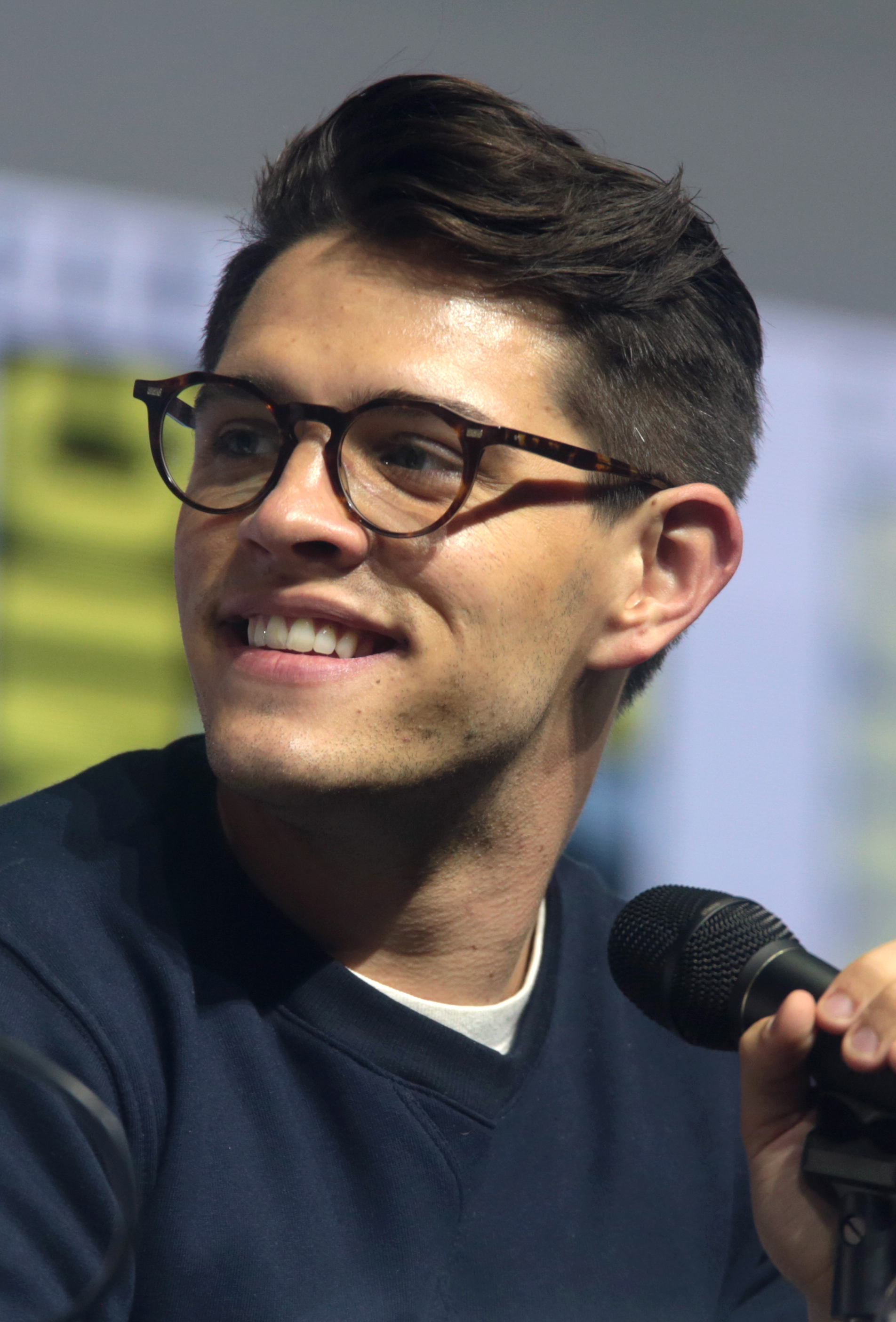
Casey Cott

Kevin Keller (portrayed by Casey Cott) is the son of Tom and Mrs. Keller.

Kevin is a sophomore at Riverdale High School and the best friend of Betty Cooper. Along with that, he has become Veronica's G.B.F. (gay best friend). Kevin also struggles with his sexuality, as he does not have the same options as his friends do. Because of this, it often causes Kevin to act recklessly at times. He has dated Joaquin, as well as had some interactions with Moose Mason, but Joaquin left Riverdale, forcing their break-up and Moose is unwilling to be "out" like Kevin, forcing him to resort to other means in order to feel something. But lately, Kevin has revealed strong feelings towards Moose, that were either rejected or unnoticed.

In the second-season finale, after Moose is upset about the death of Midge, he and Moose share a kiss.

Cott was promoted to the main cast for the second season after recurring in the first.

=== F. P. Jones ===
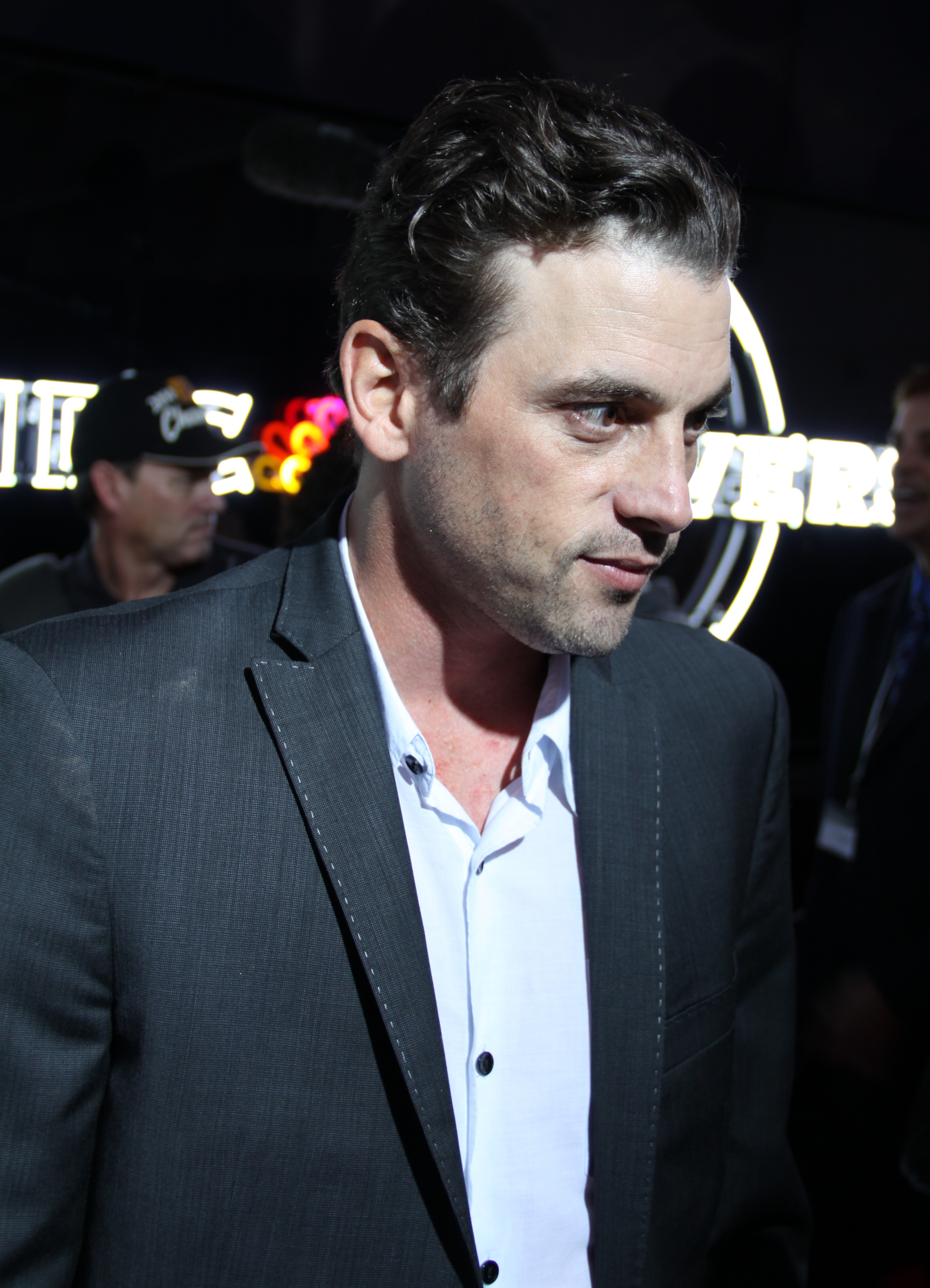
Skeet Ulrich

Forsythe Pendleton "F. P." Jones II (portrayed by Skeet Ulrich) is the ex-husband of Gladys Jones, father of Jughead and Jellybean Jones and Charles Smith Jones, and the leader of the Southside Serpents.

F. P. grew up in Riverdale and attended Riverdale High School with best friend Fred Andrews, Mary Andrews, Penelope Blossom, Alice Cooper, Hal Cooper and Hermione Lodge. At the age of sixteen, F. P.'s father kicked him out of the house and "told him to go to hell". Instead, he joined the Southside Serpents, who accepted him as one of their own. Soon thereafter, he enlisted in the army. After serving his country, F. P. returned to Riverdale, picking up from where he left off with the Serpents; however, he later retired and gave the place of king and queen to Jughead and Betty . F. P. and Fred Andrews later went on to found a construction company together, but barely made enough to stay in business. By that time, F. P. had married and become a father to two young children, whom he and his wife would frequently take to the Twilight Drive-In-however, they often could not afford tickets for everyone, so the kids would hide in the trunk until they parked. While Fred had his wife and son, Archie, to provide for, F. P. had his family as well as many hospital bills. Due to this, F. P. became involved in a string of criminal activities which would often end with him getting arrested and Fred having to bail him out. Eventually, he became too big of a liability for their company and was forced by Fred to resign. After losing his job, F. P. began drinking heavily, which led the Jones family to fall apart. F. P.'s wife left him and took their daughter with her to Toledo to live with the kids' grandparents, and Jughead began living out of the projection booth of the drive-in, where he had found employment. F. P. ended up living alone at the Sunnyside Trailer Park, where he continued drinking. At an unknown point, F. P. became the leader of the Southside Serpents, a dangerous biker gang of thugs and criminals. In the third season, he becomes the Sheriff of Riverdale after being appointed the position by Mayor Lodge. He is currently in a live-in relationship with his high-school sweetheart, Alice Cooper.

Ulrich was promoted to the main cast for the second season after recurring in the first.

=== Reggie Mantle ===
Reginald "Reggie" Mantle (portrayed by Ross Butler (season 1) and Charles Melton (season 2 to present) is Archie's long-time friend and rival, a football player at Riverdale High School and town prankster. He and Veronica started dating after Archie left however after his return Veronica felt guilty and didn't want a relationship with Reggie any longer, but they eventually got back together. Butler left the series after the first season owing to his commitments as a member of the main cast on 13 Reasons Why; Melton was cast to take over the role of Reggie in the second season on a recurring basis and was promoted to the main cast in the third season.

=== Antoinette "Toni" Topaz ===
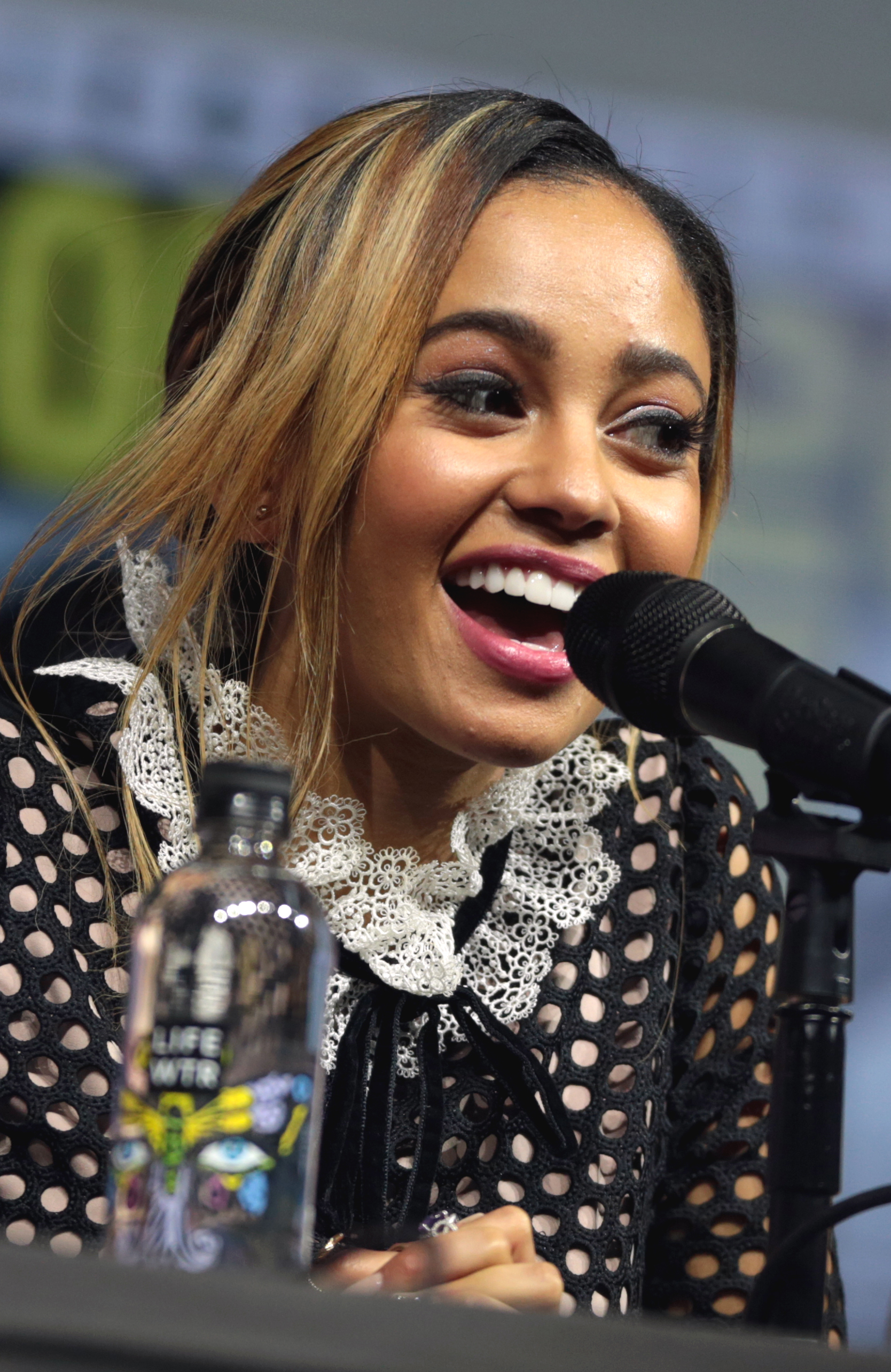
Vanessa Morgan

Antoinette "Toni" Topaz (portrayed by Vanessa Morgan) is introduced in season 2 when she befriends Jughead Jones when he starts attending Southside High. Her family are founding members of the Southside Serpents, Riverdale's notorious biker gang, which she eventually becomes the leader of. She was a social worker and then a guidance counselor at Riverdale High, as well as a bar owner and a town council member. She identifies as bisexual, and had a brief fling with Jughead in season 2 and was with Fangs in season 6, but she spends most of the series with Cheryl, and eventually marries her. She had a son named Anthony with Fangs and Kevin, who was aged up from a baby to a teenager before being erased from the timeline, and then a son with Cheryl, named Dale (portrayed by Vanessa Morgan's real son), in the new timeline.

=== Fangs Fogarty ===
Fangs Fogarty (portrayed by Drew Ray Tanner) is a member of the Southside Serpents, who is introduced in the second season when Jughead transfers to Southside High and joins the Serpents. He's bisexual and had an on again/off again relationship with Kevin throughout high school, and then a more serious one for seven years after they graduated. They get engaged and plan to have a baby with Toni as their surrogate in season 5, but when Kevin calls the engagement off, Fangs and Toni get together in season 6. Then, in season 7, Fangs is sent back to 1955 with the rest of the gang. Here, he quickly falls for Midge Klump, who he eventually marries and has a baby with before he dies tragically in a bus crash just weeks after graduation.

=== Tabitha Tate ===
Tabitha Tate (portrayed by Erinn Westbrook) is the ambitious, entrepreneurial granddaughter of Pop Tate, who has come to town to take over Pop's Chock'lit Shoppe in the hopes of franchising the iconic diner. She befriends Jughead after she gives him a job and helps him with his investigations and his drinking problem, and the two fall in love. She also befriends Betty, Veronica and Archie, and helps in their quest to make Riverdale a better place. She gains the power of chronokinesis and becomes Riverdale's guardian angel in season 6, which makes her instrumental in stopping Percival Pickens from destroying Riverdale. She uses her powers to send everyone back in 1955 before Bailey's comet can strike Riverdale, but she is unable to stay there and live her life with Jughead and her friends. She saves the timeline and the multiverse, gives them their memories back, kisses Jughead goodbye, and then disappears.

== Recurring characters ==
=== Tom Keller ===
- Martin Cummins as Tom Keller: The town's police sheriff and Kevin's father.

=== Sierra McCoy ===
- Robin Givens as Sierra McCoy: The mayor of Riverdale and Josie's mother.

=== Penelope Blossom ===
- Nathalie Boltt as Penelope Blossom: Cheryl and Jason's mother.

=== Hal Cooper ===
- Lochlyn Munro as Hal Cooper: Polly and Betty's father, and Alice Cooper's ex-husband.

=== Floyd Clayton ===
- Colin Lawrence as Floyd Clayton: Chuck's father, and coach of Riverdale Bulldogs Football Team.

=== Waldo Weatherbee ===
- Peter James Bryant as Waldo Weatherbee: The principal at Riverdale High School.

=== Geraldine Grundy ===
- Sarah Habel as Geraldine Grundy: The young music teacher at Riverdale High School, who had a sexual relationship with Archie over the summer. It is revealed in the fourth episode of the first season that Grundy moved to Riverdale after changing her name from Jennifer Gibson after her divorce, to escape from an abusive relationship. Since then Grundy has moved from Riverdale to avoid police capture because of her relationship with Archie. She is then murdered by the Black Hood in series 2.

=== Chuck Clayton ===
- Jordan Calloway as Chuck Clayton: A football-star jock at Riverdale High School.

=== Joaquin DeSantos ===
- Rob Raco as Joaquin DeSantos: The youngest member of the Southside Serpents, who finds himself tied between a romantic relationship with Kevin.

=== Melody Valentine ===
- Asha Bromfield as Melody Valentine: The drummer for the popular band Josie and the Pussycats.

=== Moose Mason ===
- Cody Kearsley as Marmaduke "Moose" Mason: Archie's bisexual jock friend, who propositions Kevin.

=== Valerie Brown ===
- Hayley Law as Valerie Brown: The songwriter, bassist, and backup vocalist for the popular band Josie and the Pussycats and Archie's ex-girlfriend.

=== Ethel Muggs ===
- Shannon Purser as Ethel Muggs: A victim of Chuck Clayton's slut-shaming, who also faces problems with her father's condition due to Hiram Lodge.

=== Jason Blossom ===
- Trevor Stines as Jason Blossom: Cheryl's twin brother, whose murder hangs over the town of Riverdale.

=== Tina Patel ===
- Olivia Ryan Stern as Tina Patel: The super-smart little sister of Archie Comics character Raj Patel, and one of Cheryl's best friends.

=== Ginger Lopez ===
- Caitlin Mitchell-Markovitch as Ginger Lopez: One of Cheryl's best friends.

=== Dilton Doiley ===
- Major Curda as Dilton Doiley: The leader of the town's troop of Ranger Scouts. Daniel Yang portrayed Dilton in the pilot.

=== Polly Cooper ===
- Tiera Skovbye as Polly Cooper: Betty's older sister, and the daughter of Alice and Hal Cooper. She is pregnant with Jason Blossom's children.

=== Clifford Blossom ===
- Barclay Hope as Clifford Blossom: Cheryl and Jason's father.

=== Nana Rose Blossom ===
- Barbara Wallace as Roseanne "Rose" Blossom: Cheryl and Jason's grandmother.

=== Pop Tate ===
- Alvin Sanders as Pop Tate: The owner of the local diner, Pop's Chock'lit Shoppe.

=== Smithers ===
- Tom McBeath as Smithers: The Lodge family butler.

=== Mary Andrews ===
- Molly Ringwald as Mary Andrews: Archie's mother, who left Archie and Fred for Chicago.

=== Tall Boy ===
- Scott McNeil as Gerald "Tall Boy" Petite: F. P.'s right-hand man, who later becomes the de facto leader of the Southside Serpents.

=== Midge Klump ===
- Emilija Baranac as Midge Klump: Moose's girlfriend and a member of the cheerleading squad at Riverdale High School.

=== Penny Peabody ===
- Brit Morgan as Penny Peabody: A member of the Southside Serpents, who blackmails Jughead.

=== Andre ===
- Stephan Miers as Andre: The Lodge family capo and personal assistant.

=== Sweet Pea ===
- Jordan Connor as Sweet Pea: A member of the Southside Serpents, who befriends Jughead.

=== Nick St. Clair ===
- Graham Phillips as Nick St. Clair: A devious, trouble-making bad boy from Veronica's past, who comes to Riverdale looking to win her back.

=== Malachai ===
- Tommy Martinez as Malachai: The leader of the Southside Serpents' rival gang, the Ghoulies.

=== Joseph Svenson ===
- Cameron McDonald as Joseph Svenson: The janitor at Riverdale High School, and notably the only survivor of the Conway family massacre, which occurred forty years ago by the hands of the Riverdale Reaper.

=== Sister Woodhouse ===
- Beverley Breuer as Sister Woodhouse: The leader at the Sisters of Quiet Mercy.

=== Chic Cooper ===
- Hart Denton as Chic: An impostor who is initially believed to be the son of Alice and F.P.

=== Arthur Adams ===
- John Behlmann as Arthur Adams: Hermione Lodge's capo, who she tasked with applying pressure to Archie as a test to his loyalty.

=== Claudius Blossom ===
- Barclay Hope as Claudius Blossom: Cheryl and Jason's uncle, and Clifford Blossom's estranged twin brother.

=== Sheriff Minetta ===
- Henderson Wade as Michael Minetta: The new police sheriff of the town, who takes over Keller's spot.

=== Elio Grande ===
- Julian Haig as Elio Grande: A rich man, who seems to have a secret interest in Veronica Lodge, and tends to help her.

=== Marty Mantle ===
- Matthew Yang King as Marty Mantle: Reggie Mantle's abusive father, and member of the Midnight Club.

=== Evelyn Evernever ===
- Zoé De Grand Maison as Evelyn Evernever: Edgar's wife, who takes an interest in Betty.

=== Warden Samuel Norton ===
- William MacDonald as Warden Norton: The Warden of the Leopold and Loeb Juvenile Detention Center.

=== Golightly ===
- Link Baker as Captain Golightly: A Captain at the Leopold and Loeb Juvenile Detention Center.

=== Dr. Curdle Jr. ===
- Nikolai Witschl as Dr. Curdle Jr.: A doctor who replaces his father Dr. Curdle after his death.

=== Munroe Moore ===
- Eli Goree as Mad Dog: Warden Norton's favorite inmate at the Leopold and Loeb Juvenile Detention Center until Archie arrives.

=== Gladys Cooper ===
- Gina Gershon as Gladys Jones: F. P.'s ex-wife and the mother of Jughead and J.B.

=== Jellybean "JB" Jones ===
- Trinity Likins as Forsythia Jellybean "J.B." Jones: Jughead's younger sister and the daughter of F. P. and Gladys.

=== Peaches 'N Cream ===
- Bernadette Beck as Peaches 'N Cream: A student at Riverdale High School and a member of the Pretty Poisons.

=== Kurtz ===
- Jonathan Whitesell as Kurtz: A student at Riverdale High School and a former member of the Southside Serpents and the Gargoyle Gang.

=== Ricky DeSantos ===
- Nico Bustamante as Ricardo "Ricky" DeSantos: Joaquin's younger brother and a member of the Gargoyle Gang.

=== Edgar Evernever ===
- Chad Michael Murray as Edgar Evernever: Evelyn's father, and the enigmatic leader of the cult-like group called the Farm.

=== Charles Smith ===
- Wyatt Nash as Charles Smith: An FBI agent and illegitimate son of Alice and F.P Jones.

=== Holden Honey ===
- Kerr Smith as Mr. Holden Honey, the new principal of Riverdale High.

=== Rupert Chipping ===
- Sam Witwer as Rupert Chipping, a teacher at Stonewall Prep, who recruits Jughead for the writing seminar.

=== Bret Weston Wallis ===
- Sean Depner as Bret Weston Wallis, an insufferably competitive student at Stonewall Prep who targets Jughead when he enrolls at the prestigious school.

=== Donna Sweett ===
- Sarah Desjardins as Donna Sweett, a Student at Stonewall Prep.

=== Hermosa Lodge ===
- Mishel Prada as Hermosa Lodge, a private investigator from Miami. She is Hiram's illegitimate daughter, and Veronica's half-sister.

=== Frank Andrews ===
- Ryan Robbins as Frank Andrews, Fred Andrews' younger brother and Archie's uncle who returns to Riverdale.

=== Francis DuPont ===
- Malcolm Stewart as Francis Dupont, originator of the Baxter Brothers books series. It is later revealed that he bought the idea from Jughead's grandfather at Stonewall Prep.

=== Forsythe Pendleton Jones I ===
- Timothy Webber as Forsythe Pendleton Jones I, father of F.P. Jones and grandfather of Jughead.

=== Eric Jackson ===
- Sommer Carbuccia as Eric Jackson, a corporal from the US Army who was saved by Archie during the war.

=== Glen Scot ===
- Greyston Holt as Glen Scot, an FBI agent who appears to have a romantic relationship with Betty.

=== Chad Gekko ===
- Chris Mason as Chadwick "Chad" Gekko, Veronica's controlling and jealous husband who works on Wall Street. Mason replaces Reid Prebenda, who portrayed the character in Katy Keene where Chadwick was introduced.

=== Minerva Marble ===
- Adeline Rudolph as Minerva Marble, a persuasive art appraiser who is interested by the Blossom family's art collection.

=== Anthony Fogarty ===
- Ace Rudy Allan Carter as Baby Anthony Fogarty, Toni and Fangs son who was previously Kevin and Fangs' son, but due to Kevin and Fangs' separation, Toni and Fangs took full custody over him.

=== Julian Blossom ===
- Nicholas Barasch as Julian Blossom, Cheryl's twin brother in 1955

=== Clay Walker ===
- Karl Walcott as Clay Walker, a new transfer student at Riverdale High School who becomes Kevin's love interest

== Guest characters ==
=== Introduced in season one ===
- Mackenzie Gray as Dr. Curdle: A doctor who helps Alice Cooper by showing her autopsies.
- Adain Bradley as Trev Brown: Valerie's younger brother.
- Raúl Castillo as Oscar Castillo: A successful songwriter from New York.
- Reese Alexander as Myles McCoy: Josie's father and Sierra's ex-husband.
- Alison Araya as Ms. Weiss: A Social Services worker who was handed Jughead's case.

=== Introduced in season two ===
- M. C. Gainey as Paul "Poppa Poutine" Boucher: One of Hiram's business associates.
- Harrison MacDonald as Cassidy Bullock: A man who is killed by Andre; however, Archie is later framed by Hiram Lodge as his murderer.
- Azura Skye as Darla: A woman who threatens Alice and Betty to give her money as a form of debt from Chic.
- Andre Tricoteux as "Small Fry" Boucher: Paul "Poppa Poutine" Boucher's son, who comes to Riverdale to get revenge on the Lodges for his father's murder.

=== Introduced in season three ===
- Penelope Ann Miller as Ms. Wright: The district attorney in charge of prosecuting Archie's murder case.
- Simon C. Hussey as Marcus Mason: Moose's father, and the RROTC instructor.
- Connor Paton as Brandon "Baby Teeth" Morris: An inmate at the Leopold and Loeb Juvenile Detention Center.
- Matthew Yang King as Marty Mantle: Reggie's abusive father, and an alumnus of Riverdale High School.
- Kelly Ripa as Mrs. Mulwray: Hiram Lodge's alleged mistress, who finds herself deeply involved in a conspiracy.
- Darcy Hinds as Randy Ronson: Elio Grande's fighter, who fights Archie in the ring.
- Anna Van Hooft as Ms. Ronson: Randy Ronson's sister, who blames Archie for the death of her brother.

=== Introduced in season five ===
- AC Bonifacio as Star Vixen
- Zara Antwi as Baby Anthony Fogarty, Toni and Fangs son who was previously Kevin and Fangs' son, but due to Kevin and Fangs' separation, Toni and Fangs took full custody over him.

=== Introduced in season six ===
- Will Jackson as Anthony Fogarty, Toni and Fangs' teenage son, who as an infant/baby was Kevin and Fangs' son, but due to Kevin and Fangs' separation, Toni and Fangs took full custody over him and soon thereafter Toni and Fangs got married and now became his official biological parents. Hence, his surname is the same as Fangs'.

== Crossover guest characters ==
- Ty Wood as Billy Marlin: A jock from Greendale. Billy appeared in "Chapter Sixty-Seven: Varsity Blues" from season four and is a character from Chilling Adventures of Sabrina.
- Lucy Hale as Katy Keene: An aspiring fashion designer from New York City and Veronica's friend. Katy appeared in "Chapter Sixty-Nine: Men of Honor" from season four and is a character from Katy Keene. The character also made a vocal cameo in "Chapter Eighty-Four: Lock & Key" from season five.
- Zane Holtz as K.O. Kelly: A boxer and Katy's longtime boyfriend. K.O. appeared in "Chapter Seventy-Seven: Climax" from season five, and in "Chapter One Hundred and Five: Folk Heroes" from season six. He is a character from Katy Keene.
- Ryan Faucett as Bernardo Bixby: A firefighter from New York City. Bernardo appeared in "Chapter Eighty-Three: Fire in the Sky" from season five and is a character from Katy Keene.
- Camille Hyde as Alexandra "Xandra" Cabot: A powerful New York socialite and the senior vice president of Cabot Entertainment. Alexandra appeared in "Chapter Ninety-One: The Return of the Pussycats" from season five and "Chapter One Hundred and Seventeen: Night of the Comet" from season six is a character from Katy Keene.
- Kiernan Shipka as Sabrina Spellman: A half-human, half-witch teenager from Greendale and the Dark Lord's daughter. Sabrina appeared in "Chapter Ninety-Nine: The Witching Hour(s)" and "Chapter One Hundred and Fourteen: The Witches of Riverdale" from season six and is a character from Chilling Adventures of Sabrina.
- The character of Nicholas "Nick" Scratch also appeared in "Chapter One Hundred and Fourteen: The Witches of Riverdale", portrayed by Cole Sprouse. Nick is a character from Chilling Adventures of Sabrina. Gavin Leatherwood portrayed the character in Sabrina. In Riverdale, Sabrina resurrected him using Jughead's body.
