= Lisa Gallagher =

Lisa Gallagher may refer to:

- Lisa Gallagher, character in A Killing Spring
- Lisa Gallagher, political candidate for Brandon—Souris
- Lisa Gallagher, presenter on BBC Look North (East Yorkshire and Lincolnshire)
