= Wendy Crewson =

Canadian actress (born 1956)

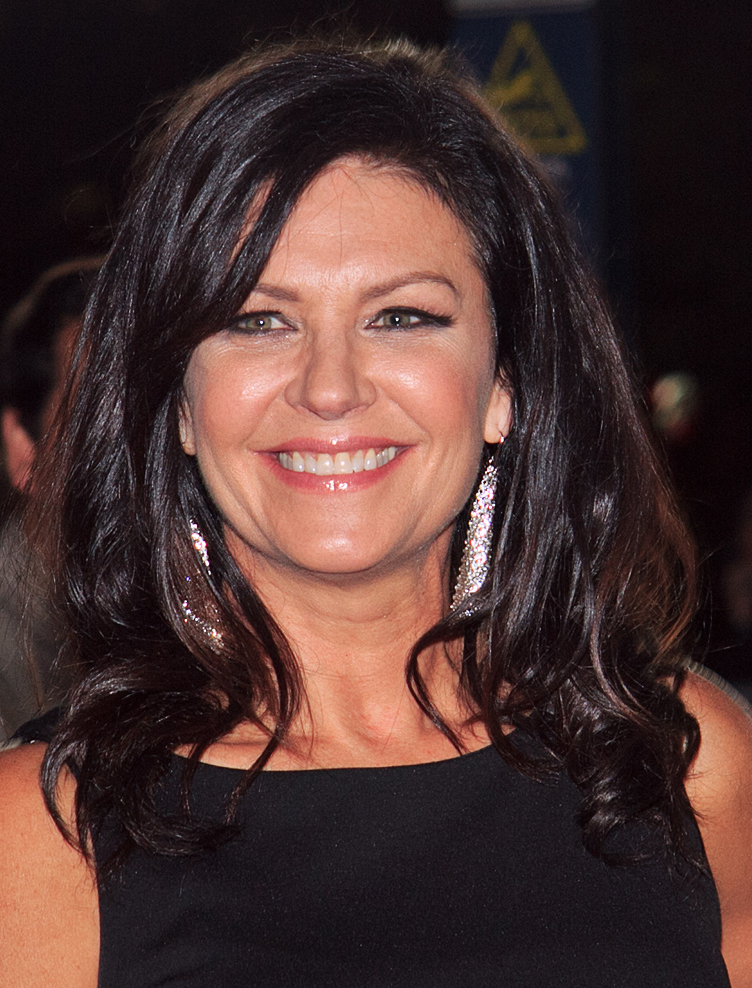
- Crewson in 2011
- Born: Wendy Jane Crewson; May 9, 1956 (age 70); Hamilton, Ontario, Canada
- Occupations: Actress, producer
- Years active: 1980–present
- Spouse: Michael Murphy (m. 1988; div. 2009)
- Children: 2

Wendy Jane Crewson (born May 9, 1956) is a Canadian actress and producer. She began her career on Canadian television, before her breakthrough role in the 1991 dramatic film The Doctor.

Crewson has appeared in many Hollywood films, including The Good Son (1993), The Santa Clause (1994) and its sequels The Santa Clause 2 (2002) and The Santa Clause 3: The Escape Clause (2006), To Gillian on Her 37th Birthday (1996), Air Force One (1997), Bicentennial Man (1999), What Lies Beneath (2000), The 6th Day (2000), The Covenant (2006) and Eight Below (2006). She also starred in a number of independent movies, such as Better Than Chocolate (1999), Suddenly Naked (2001), Perfect Pie (2002), Away from Her (2006), Into the Forest (2015) and Room (2015).

Crewson has won six Gemini Awards, two Canadian Screen Awards and an ACTRA Award for her performances on television. She played leading roles in a number of television films, include playing Joanne Kilbourn in six movies based on novels by Gail Bowen. She had recurring roles on American television series 24 and Revenge, and the Canadian television series Frankie Drake Mysteries. From 2012 to 2017, Crewson co-starred in the CTV medical drama Saving Hope.

== Early life ==
Crewson was born in Hamilton, Ontario, the daughter of June Doreen (née Thomas) and Robert Binnie Crewson. She attended John Rennie High School in Pointe-Claire, Québec, as did her younger brother, Brad Crewson.

She attended Queen's University in Kingston, Ontario, where she won the Lorne Greene Award for outstanding work in the theatre. She then studied at the Webber Douglas Academy of Dramatic Art in London.

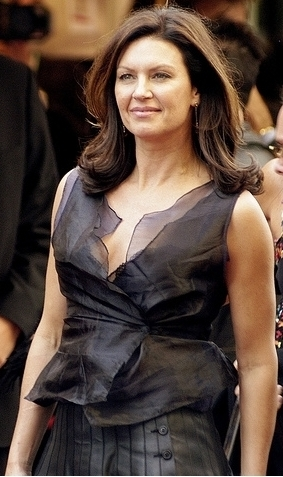
Crewson at the 2006 Toronto International Film Festival

== Career ==
When she returned to Canada, Crewson landed a leading role in the television movie War Brides (1980) directed by Martin Lavut, for which she received her first ACTRA Award nomination. From 1980 to 1983, she starred in the CBC drama series, Home Fires, a family saga set in Toronto during World War II. For the final season, she won the ACTRA Award for Best Actress in a Drama Series in 1984. In 1982, she made her American debut starring alongside Tom Hanks in the television drama film Mazes and Monsters.

During 1980s, Crewson appeared in a number of Canadian television productions, including a recurring roles on Night Heat and Street Legal, and several television films. She was lead actress in two short lived American drama series: Hard Copy (CBS, 1987), and Studio 5-B (ABC, 1989). In 1988, she starred in the HBO political mockumentary miniseries Tanner '88 directed by Robert Altman, and in 1990 starred in Getting Married in Buffalo Jump, for which she was nominated for Gemini Award for Best Performance by an Actress in a Leading Role in a Dramatic Program or Mini-Series. She also received Gemini Awards nominations for I'll Never Get to Heaven (1992), A Killing Spring (2002), Sex Traffic (2004), The Robber Bride (2007), and The Summit (2008), and won for At the End of the Day: The Sue Rodriguez Story (1999), The Many Trials of One Jane Doe (2002), and The Man Who Lost Himself (2005). Crewson also won Gemini Awards for guest starring in Due South in 1998, and supporting role in ReGenesis in 2007.

In 1991, Crewson appeared in her first breakthrough role in the American drama film The Doctor starring William Hurt. The following year, she starred opposite Tom Selleck in the comedy-drama Folks!, the film was panned by critics and grossed only $6 million. In 1993, she starred in the psychological thriller The Good Son (1993), and in 1994 appeared opposite Whoopi Goldberg in Corrina, Corrina. Also in 1994, Crewson starred alongside Tim Allen in the financially successful Christmas comedy film The Santa Clause. The film grossed $189 million and its two sequels, The Santa Clause 2 (2002) and The Santa Clause 3: The Escape Clause (2006) also grossed $283 million worldwide together.

In 1996, Crewson co-starred in the romantic drama film To Gillian on Her 37th Birthday as Peter Gallagher's unfortunate blind date, and the following year played Grace Marshall, First Lady to President James Marshall (Harrison Ford) in the political thriller Air Force One directed by Wolfgang Petersen. She also appeared in Gang Related (1997), played a leading role in Sleeping Dogs Lie (1998), and co-starred opposite Robin Williams in the science fiction film Bicentennial Man (1999). In 2000, she played Arnold Schwarzenegger's wife in The 6th Day, and appeared in What Lies Beneath. She also appeared in Between Strangers (2002), The Clearing (2004), Eight Below (2006), The Covenant (2006), Academy Award-nominated Away from Her (2006), The Seeker (2007), Winnie Mandela (2011), Antiviral (2012), Into the Forest, Room (2015), Kodachrome (2017), and On the Basis of Sex (2018).

Crewson starred in independent movies Better Than Chocolate (1999) and Suddenly Naked (2001), both directed by Anne Wheeler. In 2002, she starred in drama film Perfect Pie, for which she received ACTRA Award nomination. She had leading roles in a number of made for television movies. She starred opposite Robert Urich in Lifetime movies Spenser: The Judas Goat (1994) and Spenser: A Savage Place (1995), and opposite Susan Lucci in Ebbie (1995). In 1998, she played Faye Stafford, wife of Thomas Stafford, in the Sally Field-directed episode of HBO miniseries From the Earth to the Moon. Other credits including Lives of Girls & Women (1996), Summer's End (1999), The Matthew Shepard Story (2002), An Unexpected Love (2003), Twelve Mile Road (2003), and The Path to 9/11 (2006). From 2000 to 2002, she played Joanne Kilbourn, a single mom of three and an ex-cop who teaches criminology and solves crimes in her spare time, in six movies based on novels by Gail Bowen.

In 2003, Crewson took a recurring role as Dr. Anne Packard, personal physician and love interest to the President, of the third season of Fox drama series 24. From 2006 to 2010, she hosted W Network series Crimes of Passion, and from 2007 to 2008 starred on the Canadian science-fiction series ReGenesis as Dr. Rachel Woods. She later guest-starred on Flashpoint, Rookie Blue, CSI: Crime Scene Investigation and Murdoch Mysteries. From 2012 to 2013, she had a recurring role during the second season of ABC primetime soap opera Revenge playing villainous Helen Crowley. Also in 2012, Crewson began playing Dr. Dana Kinny in the CTV medical drama Saving Hope, for which she received Canadian Screen Award for Best Supporting Actress in a Drama Program or Series in 2013. The series ended in 2017. Also in 2017, she won another Canadian Screen Award for Best Supporting Actress for her recurring role on Slasher.

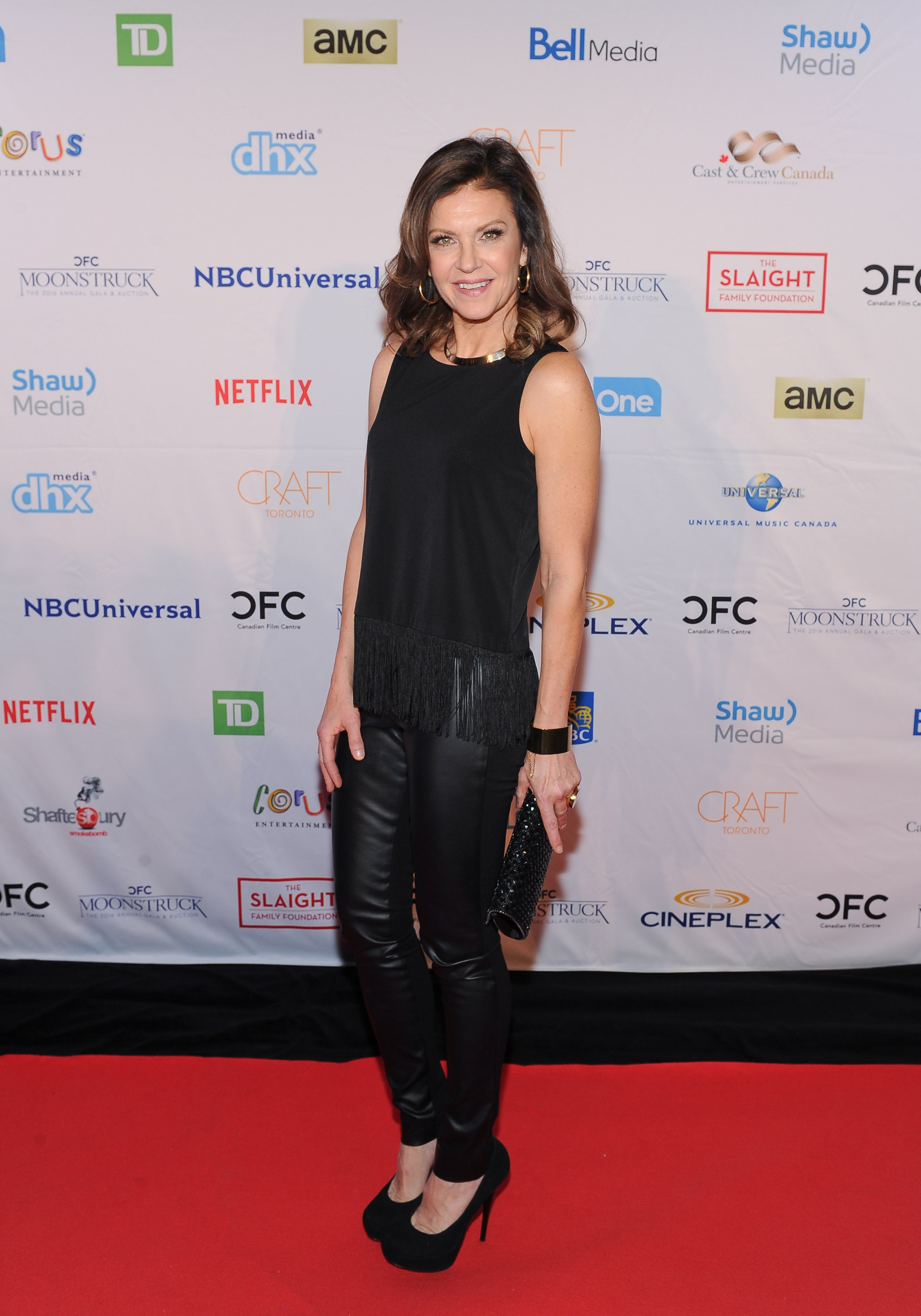
Crewson at the 2016 CFC Annual Gala & Auction

In 2015, Crewson was inducted to Canada's Walk of Fame. In 2016, she received the Earle Grey Award, which recognizes actors for their contributions to the international profile of Canadian TV or for their significant body of work.

From 2017 to 2021, Crewson played a recurring role lead character's mother and assisting her in investigations in the CBC drama series, Frankie Drake Mysteries. She received two nominations for Canadian Screen Award for Best Guest Performance, Drama Series. Also that time, she had a recurring role on the CBC sitcom Workin' Moms, receiving another Canadian Screen Award nomination in 2020. In 2018, she starred in the CTV crime drama series, The Detail, for which she was nominated for a Canadian Screen Award for Best Actress in a Continuing Leading Dramatic Role. In 2019, she starred in the Hallmark series When Hope Calls, and in 2020 starred in the Netflix horror series October Faction. In 2021, she starred in the second season of Peacock series Departure, and in 2022 starred as title character' mother in the CBS medical drama Good Sam. She later was cast in the third season of CBC Television police drama Pretty Hard Cases and the internationally produced thriller Gray.

Crewson has appeared on the CBS drama series Tracker in February 2024, replacing Mary McDonnell in recasting.

== Personal life ==
She married actor Michael Murphy in 1988, and they have two children. They divorced in January 2009, but remain friends and worked together on the film Fall (2014).

Crewson came out publicly as lesbian in December 2014, and revealed to the press that she had come out to her family years earlier. In 2015, it was reported that Crewson was in a relationship with Julie Bristow, president of Bristow Global Media in Canada.

She resides in Rosedale, Toronto.

== Filmography ==
=== Film ===
Year	Title	Role	Notes
1983	Skullduggery	Barbara / Dorigen	
1986	Whodunit?	Elizabeth	
1986	Mark of Cain	Dale	
1991	The Doctor	Dr. Leslie Abbott	
1992	Folks!	Audrey Aldrich	
1993	The Good Son	Susan Evans	
1994	Corrina, Corrina	Jenny Davis	
1994	The Santa Clause	Laura Calvin Miller	
1996	To Gillian on Her 37th Birthday	Kevin Dollof	
1997	Air Force One	First Lady Grace Marshall	
1997	Gang Related	District Attorney Helen Eden	
1997	The Eighteenth Angel	Norah Stanton	
1998	Where's Marlowe?	Dr. Ninki Bregman	
1998	Sleeping Dogs Lie	Theresa Small	
1999	Better Than Chocolate	Lila	
1999	Question of Privilege	Gail Sterling	
1999	Escape Velocity	Billie	
1999	Bicentennial Man	Rachel "Ma'am" Martin	
2000	Mercy	Bernadine Mello	
2000	What Lies Beneath	Elena	
2000	The 6th Day	Natalie Gibson	
2001	Suddenly Naked	Jackie York	Also executive producer
2002	Between Strangers	Amanda Trent	
2002	Perfect Pie	Patsy Willets	Nominated — ACTRA Award for Outstanding Performance - Female
2002	The Santa Clause 2	Laura Calvin Miller	
2004	The Clearing	Louise Miller	
2004	A Home at the End of the World	Isabel Morrow	
2005	Niagara Motel	Lily	
2006	Eight Below	Eve McClaren	
2006	The Covenant	Evelyn Danvers	
2006	Away from Her	Madeleine Montpellier	
2006	Who Loves the Sun	Mary Bloom	
2006	The Santa Clause 3: The Escape Clause	Laura Calvin Miller	
2007	The Seeker	Mary Stanton	
2009	Formosa Betrayed	Susan Kane	
2010	A Beginner's Guide to Endings	Goldie White	
2011	Winnie Mandela	Mary Botha	
2012	The Vow	Dr. Fishman	
2012	Antiviral	Mira Tesser	
2014	Fall	Sheila	
2015	Into the Forest	Mom	
2015	Room	Talk Show Hostess	
2018	Death Wish	Dr. Jill Klavens	
2018	Kodachrome	Aunt Sarah	
2018	On the Basis of Sex	Harriet Griswold	
2019	From the Vine	Marina Gentile	
2020	The Nest	Allison's Mum	
2020	The Kid Detective	Mrs. Applebaum	
2023	Backspot	Suzanne	
2023	Close to You	Miriam	Nominated — Vancouver Film Critics Circle Award for Best Supporting Actress in a Canadian Film
2026	Mayday	Assistant Director Karen Meadows	

=== Television films ===
Year	Title	Role	Notes
1980	War Brides	Kate	Nominated — ACTRA Award for Outstanding Performance - Female
1982	Mazes and Monsters	Kate Finch	
1984	Heartsounds	Judy	
1984	The Guardian	Marlee Kramer	
1985	Murder in Space	Irene Tremayne	
1985	Murder: By Reason of Insanity	Irene Tremayne	
1985	My Father, My Rival	Hilah	
1986	Perry Mason: The Case of the Shooting Star	Michelle Benti	
1987	A Hobo's Christmas	Laurie	
1987	Covert Action	Jessica	
1988	Spies, Lies & Naked Thighs	Evelyn	
1990	Getting Married in Buffalo Jump	Sophie Ware	Nominated — Gemini Award for Best Performance by an Actress in a Leading Role in a Dramatic Program or Mini-Series
1993	I'll Never Get to Heaven	Cassie Stewart	Nominated — Gemini Award for Best Performance by an Actress in a Leading Role in a Dramatic Program or Mini-Series
1994	To Save the Children	Dorsie Young	
1994	Lives of Girls & Women	Ada Jordan	
1994	Frostfire	Victoria Renko	
1994	Spenser: The Judas Goat	Susan Silverman	
1995	Spenser: A Savage Place	Susan Silverman	
1995	Ebbie	Roberta "Robbie" Cratchet	
1998	At the End of the Day: The Sue Rodriguez Story	Sue Rodriguez	Gemini Award for Best Performance by an Actress in a Leading Role in a Dramatic Program or Mini-Series
1999	Summer's End	Virginia Baldwin	
2000	Love and Murder	Joanne Kilbourn	
2000	Deadly Appearances	Joanne Kilbourn	
2001	The Wandering Soul Murders	Joanne Kilbourn	
2001	A Colder Kind of Death	Joanne Kilbourn	
2001	The Last Brickmaker in America	Karen	
2002	The Many Trials of One Jane Doe	Jane Doe	
2002	A Killing Spring	Joanne Kilbourn	Also associate producer Nominated — Gemini Award for Best Performance by an Actress in a Leading Role in a Dramatic Program or Mini-Series
2002	Verdict in Blood	Joanne Kilbourn	Also associate producer
2002	The Matthew Shepard Story	Sarah	
2002	The Elfkins First Christmas	Grazellda	Voice role
2003	An Unexpected Love	McNally "Mac" Hays	
2003	The Many Trials of One Jane Doe	Jane Doe	Gemini Award for Best Performance by an Actress in a Leading Role in a Dramatic Program or Mini-Series
2003	The Piano Man's Daughter	Ede Kilworth	
2003	Twelve Mile Road	Angela Landis	
2004	Jack	Elaine Burka	
2005	Hunt for Justice	Louise Arbour	
2005	The Man Who Lost Himself	Lorraine Evanshen	Gemini Award for Best Performance by an Actress in a Leading Role in a Dramatic Program or Mini-Series; Nominated — ACTRA Award for Outstanding Performance - Female
2007	The Robber Bride	Roz Andrews	Nominated — Gemini Award for Best Performance by an Actress in a Featured Supporting Role in a Dramatic Program or Mini-Series
2013	Jack	Anne McGrath	
2021	Under the Christmas Tree	Isabella Beltran	

=== Television series ===
Year	Title	Role	Notes
1980-1983	Home Fires	Terry	Main role ACTRA Award for Best Actress in a Drama Series (1984)
1981	The Littlest Hobo	Jenny	Episode "The Locket"
1982	Hangin' In	Hilary	"Barnum and Baby"
1985	Night Heat	Prosecutor Dorothy Fredericks	Recurring role, 6 episodes
1986	Adderly	Marge	Episode: "Critical Mass"
1987	Hard Copy	Blake Calisher	Series regular, 6 episodes
1987	CBS Summer Playhouse	Dana	Episode: "In the Lion's Den"
1988	Tanner '88	Joanna Buckley	Miniseries
1989	Studio 5-B	Gail Browning	Series regular, 10 episodes
1990	Street Legal	Wendy Nelson	Recurring role, 3 episodes
1997	Due South	Janet Morse	Episode: "The Bounty Hunter"; Gemini Award for Best Performance by an Actress in a Guest Role in a Dramatic Series
1997	Black Harbour	Carolyn Bedford	Episodes: "Love's Labours Lost", "High Noon"
1998	From the Earth to the Moon	Faye Stafford	Episode: "The Original Wives Club"
2001	The Beast	Maggie Steech	Recurring role. 6 episodes
2003	24	Dr. Anne Packard	Recurring role, 8 episodes
2004	Sex Traffic	Madeleine Harlsburgh	Miniseries; Nominated — Gemini Award for Best Performance by an Actress in a Leading Role in a Dramatic Program or Mini-Series
2006	The Path to 9/11	Valerie James	Miniseries
2007-2008	ReGenesis	Rachel Woods	Series regular, 24 episodes Gemini Award for Best Performance by an Actress in a Featured Supporting Role in a Dramatic Series (2007); Nominated — Gemini Award for Best Performance by an Actress in a Featured Supporting Role in a Dramatic Series (2008)
2008	The Summit	Ellie Bruckner	Miniseries; Nominated — Gemini Award for Best Performance by an Actress in a Featured Supporting Role in a Dramatic Program or Mini-Series
2009	Flashpoint	Catherine Graham	Episode: "Eagle Two"
2010	The Bridge	Mayor Kennedy	Recurring role, 4 episodes
2010	Rookie Blue	Dana Kennedy	Episode: "In Blue"
2011	Endgame	Vivian Huxley	Episode: "The White Queen"
2011	CSI: Crime Scene Investigation	Judy Robbins	Episode: "Genetic Disorder"
2012	Alcatraz	Helen Campbell	Episode: "Sonny Burnett"
2012	Fairly Legal	Warden Sara Wilkes	Episode: "Ripple of Hope"
2012-2013	Revenge	Helen Crowley	Recurring role, 9 episodes
2012–2017	Saving Hope	Dr. Dana Kinney	Series regular, 41 episodes Canadian Screen Award for Best Supporting Actress in a Drama Program or Series (2013)
2014	Murdoch Mysteries	Cassie Chadwick	Episode: "The Murdoch Sting"
2014	Working the Engels	Mrs. Guernsey	Episodes: "Maid Amends", "Jenna vs. Big Pastry Part II"
2014	Ascension	Katherine Warren	Miniseries
2015	We Are Disorderly	Judy	Episode: "Our Leather Jackets"
2015	Defiance	Silora Voske	Episode: "When Twilight Dims the Sky Above"
2015	Beauty & the Beast	Helen Ellingsworth	Episodes: "Unbreakable", "Sins of the Fathers"
2015	Forgive Me	Celeste	Episodes: "Full of Grace", "Amongst Women", "Pray for Us Sinners"
2016	Slasher	Brenda Merritt	Series regular, 2 episodes Canadian Screen Award for Best Supporting Actress in a Drama Program or Series
2017–2018	The Son	Ingrid	2 episodes
2017–2019	Workin' Moms	Victoria Stromanger	Recurring role, 4 episodes Nominated — Canadian Screen Award for Best Guest Performance, Comedy (2020)
2017	Good Witch	Olympia	Episode: "Not Getting Married Today, Part 2"
2017–2021	Frankie Drake Mysteries	Nora Drake	Recurring role, 13 episodes Nominated — Canadian Screen Award for Best Guest Performance, Drama Series (2021–22)
2018	The Detail	Fiona Currie	Series regular, 10 episodes Nominated — Canadian Screen Award for Best Actress in a Continuing Leading Dramatic Role
2019–2026	When Hope Calls	Tess Stewart	Series regular; 18 episodes
2020	October Faction	Maggie Allen	Series regular, 10 episodes
2021	Superman & Lois	Dr. Wiles	Episode: "Holding the Wrench"
2021	Titans	Valeska Nox	2 episodes
2022	Departure	Diana Bright	Series regular, 6 episodes Nominated — Canadian Screen Award for Best Supporting Performance in a Drama Program or Series
2022	Good Sam	Vivian Katz	Series regular, 13 episodes
2023	Pretty Hard Cases	UC Gloria Ballard	Series regular, 10 episodes
2023	Gray	Gold	Series regular
2024–2026	Tracker	Mary Dove Shaw	Guest starring role, 4 episodes
2025	We Were Liars	Tipper Tatt Sinclair	Recurring role, 4 episodes
2025	Irish Blood	Mary	6 episodes

== Awards and nominations ==
- Gemini Awards
  - 1992 — Gemini Award for Best Performance by an Actress in a Continuing Leading Dramatic Role for Getting Married in Buffalo Jump (Nominated)
  - 1994 — Best Performance by an Actress in a Continuing Leading Dramatic Role for I'll Never Get to Heaven (Nominated)
  - 1998 — Best Performance by an Actress in a Guest Role in a Dramatic Series for Due South
  - 1999 — Best Performance by an Actress in a Leading Role in a Dramatic Program or Miniseries for At the End of the Day: The Sue Rodriguez Story
  - 2002 — Best Performance by an Actress in a Continuing Leading Dramatic Role for A Killing Spring (Nominated)
  - 2002 — Humanitarian Award
  - 2003 — Best Performance by an Actress in a Continuing Leading Dramatic Role for The Many Trials of One Jane Doe
  - 2005 — Best Performance by an Actress in a Continuing Leading Dramatic Role for Sex Traffic (Nominated)
  - 2006 — Best Performance by an Actress in a Continuing Leading Dramatic Role for The Man Who Lost Himself
  - 2007 — Best Performance by an Actress in a Featured Supporting Role in a Dramatic Program or Mini-Series for The Robber Bride (Nominated)
  - 2007 — Best Performance by an Actress in a Featured Supporting Role in a Dramatic Program or Mini-Series for ReGenesis
  - 2008 — Best Performance by an Actress in a Featured Supporting Role in a Dramatic Program or Mini-Series for ReGenesis (Nominated)
  - 2010 — Best Performance by an Actress in a Featured Supporting Role in a Dramatic Program or Mini-Series for The Summit (Nominated)
  Canadian Screen Awards
  - 2013 — Best Performance by an Actress in a Featured Supporting Role in a Dramatic Program or Mini-Series for Saving Hope
  - 2017 — Best Performance by an Actress in a Featured Supporting Role in a Dramatic Program or Series for Slasher
  ACTRA Award
  - 2007 - ACTRA Toronto Award of Excellence
