= Twelve Mile Road =

- Genre: Drama
- Based on: Mystery Ride by Robert Boswell
- Written by: Richard Friedenberg
- Directed by: Richard Friedenberg
- Starring: Tom Selleck; Wendy Crewson; Maggie Grace; Anna Gunn; Patrick Flueger
- Music by: Jeff Beal
- Country of origin: United States
- Original language: English

Production
- Executive producers: Wendy Hill-Tout; Lisa Demberg; Laurie Marie Parker
- Producer: Avi Noam Levy
- Production location: Calgary
- Cinematography: Robin Loewen
- Editor: Paul Dixon
- Running time: 120 minutes
- Production companies: Fox Television Studios; Voice Pictures

Original release
- Network: CBS
- Release: September 28, 2003

Twelve Mile Road is a 2003 American drama television film written and directed by Richard Friedenberg, based on the 1994 novel Mystery Ride by Robert Boswell. The film stars Tom Selleck, Wendy Crewson, Maggie Grace, Anna Gunn, and Patrick Flueger. The story is set in Idaho and follows the challenging relationship between a man and his estranged daughter as they reunite and attempt to work out their complicated family issues. It aired on CBS on September 28, 2003.

== Plot ==
After a rough divorce, farmer Stephen Landis lives a normal life living on his ranch in Idaho with his girlfriend Leah and her daughter, Roxanne. But life once again gets complicated for Stephen when his daughter Dulcie comes for a summer visit after having a fight with her mother. Stephen's absence as a father and failed marriage with Angela left Dulcie in a rebellious state as a troubled teenager. Stephen's ex-wife attempts to warn him of their daughter's disruptive behaviors, but combined with his feelings of guilt, the relationship threatens to ruin his present relationship and life with Leah. Dulcie and her father try to begin to heal their problems, but the damage may be too great to resolve and jeopardizes the chance of a bright future for either of them.

== Cast ==
- Tom Selleck as Stephen Landis
- Wendy Crewson as Angela Landis
- Maggie Grace as Dulcie Landis
- Anna Gunn as Leah O'Dell
- Patrick Flueger as Will Coffey
- Tegan Moss as Roxanne O'Dell
- Tim Henry as Aza Coffey
- Beverley Breuer as Henrietta Coffey
- Dan Petronijevic as Tony
- Jenna Friedenberg as Dawn
- Hamish Boyd as Reverend Loemer

== Production ==
Filming took place in Calgary, including at CFB West Studios.

== Awards and nominations ==
| Year | Result | Award | Category/Recipient |
|---|---|---|---|
| 2004 | Nominated | Young Artist Award | Best Young Adult Performer in a Teenage Role - Patrick Flueger |
| 2004 | Nominated | Golden Reel Award | Best Sound Editing in Television Long Form - Dialogue & ADR |
