= Studio 5-B =

American drama television series

- Genre: Drama
- Created by: Judith Parker
- Starring: Kerrie Keane; Wendy Crewson; Jeffrey Tambor; Justin Deas
- Composer: David Kurtz
- Country of origin: United States
- Original language: English
- No. of seasons: 1
- No. of episodes: 10 (7 unaired)

Production
- Running time: 60 minutes
- Production company: Lorimar Television

Original release
- Network: ABC
- Release: January 24 – February 5, 1989

Studio 5-B (also common known as Studio 5B) is an American drama series that aired on ABC from January 24 until February 5, 1989. The series aired in its entirety in Britain on BBC2 in 1989.

== Cast ==
- Kerrie Keane as Carla Montgomery
- Wendy Crewson as Gail Browning
- Kim Myers as Samantha Hurley
- Justin Deas as Jake Gallagher
- Kenneth David Gilman as David Chase
- George Grizzard as Douglas Hayward
- Jeffrey Tambor as Lionel Goodman

== Episodes ==
No.	Title	Directed by	Written by	Original release date	Viewers (millions)
1	"Pilot"	Sheldon Larry	Judith Parker	January 24, 1989	18.8
2	"The Aftermath"	Unknown	Unknown	January 29, 1989	8.8
3	"Life's Too Short"	Unknown	Unknown	February 5, 1989	6.7
4	"Surro-Gate"	N/A	N/A	Unaired	N/A
5	"The Perfect View"	N/A	N/A	Unaired	N/A
6	"Rags to Riches"	N/A	N/A	Unaired	N/A
7	"Sex and Violence"	N/A	N/A	Unaired	N/A
8	"Glasnost"	N/A	N/A	Unaired	N/A
9	"To Air is Human"	N/A	N/A	Unaired	N/A
10	"Dirty Laundry"	N/A	N/A	Unaired	N/A
