= An Unexpected Love =

2003 made for television drama film directed by Lee Rose

- DVD cover
- Written by: Lee Rose
- Directed by: Lee Rose
- Starring: Leslie Hope; Wendy Crewson; D.W. Moffett; Alison Pill; Margo Martindale; Brent Spiner
- Music by: Velton Ray Bunch
- Country of origin: United States
- Original language: English

Production
- Executive producers: Lee Rose; Gary A. Randall
- Cinematography: Jan Kiesser
- Editor: Peter V. White
- Running time: 100 minutes
- Production company: Lee Rose Productions

Original release
- Network: Lifetime
- Release: March 24, 2003

An Unexpected Love is a 2003 American made-for-television drama film written, produced and directed by Lee Rose. It stars Leslie Hope, Wendy Crewson, D.W. Moffett, Alison Pill, Margo Martindale and Brent Spiner. The movie premiered on Lifetime network on March 24, 2003.

== Plot ==
Kate Mayer is quickly approaching forty, and a suburban wife and mother of two. She realizes her marriage has come to an end after one too many arguments with her husband. She asks her husband for a separation and moves out with her two kids. Jobless and without any work experience, she accepts a low-level position as a receptionist for a real estate office. Eventually, she is promoted to real estate agent, but she still has to deal with her husband, her disapproving mother and her children, who are trying to adjust to their new environment. At work, Kate finds herself strongly attracted to her boss, McNally "Mac" Hays, who is a lesbian. When the two finally start dating and fall in love, she is confronted with an angry and confused family.

== Cast ==
- Leslie Hope as Kate Mayer
- Wendy Crewson as McNally "Mac" Hays
- D.W. Moffett as Jack Mayer
- Alison Pill as Samantha Mayer
- Margo Martindale as Maggie
- Brent Spiner as Brad
- Elizabeth Franz as Dorothy
- Irma P. Hall as Mary
- Christine Ebersole as Sandy
- Curtis Butchart as Adam Mayer

== Production notes ==
Director Lee Rose, who is a lesbian, said "creating a serious film about homosexuality is difficult", besides network sensitivities, there's a reluctance among actors to get involved. She said Hope and Crewson were "courageous" for agreeing to star in the film. Both Hope and Crewson said they had no qualms about accepting the roles. The two actors were actually friends at the time, and according to them, the only problem was filming their romantic encounter. Crewson said, "I think it's much easier if you don't know the person."

== Critical reception ==
Kissing Fingertips said in their review that the film "doesn't live up to its title in at least one significant way...believing these women were in love". They complimented lesbian writer/director Lee Rose as..."becoming the guru of the TV movie lesbian"... and said the actors did OK with what they were given. Andy Webb in his review said Leslie Hope and Wendy Crewson played their parts well, "delivering the aspect of conflicted feelings but also bringing out the humor in their characters". But it is the "wonderful Margo Martindale as Maggie who brings the best laughs thanks to her natural ability to deliver lines with that aspect of knowing which makes them fun". Lynn Elber from the Associated Press said the "film's tone is quietly reserved; even the one sex scene between Kate and Mac is brief and tame". According to Elber, Lifetime ordered that a longer version of the sex scene be cut from the film as too revealing. In a WLW film review, they were disappointed, saying the film "feels entry level". They said the writing is "cliché after cliché" and its direction is "very much point and shoot with little artistry". Overall. they rated the movie 5.2 out of 10.

== See also ==
- List of LGBT-related films directed by women
- List of made-for-television films with LGBT characters
