= A Killing Spring =

- Based on: A Killing Spring by Gail Bowen
- Written by: Jeremy Hole; Janet MacLean; Joe Wiesenfeld
- Directed by: Stephen Williams
- Starring: Wendy Crewson
- Music by: Robert Carli
- Country of origin: Canada
- Original language: English

Production
- Producer: Christina Jennings
- Cinematography: David Herrington
- Editor: Ralph Brunjes
- Running time: 90 minutes

Original release
- Release: January 29, 2002

A Killing Spring is a 2002 Canadian made-for-television thriller film directed by Stephen Williams and starring Wendy Crewson, Kim Schraner. The film's plot concerns the murder of a college dean.

== Cast ==
- Wendy Crewson - Joanne Kilbourn
- Shawn Doyle - Detective Alex Emanuel
- Michael Ontkean - Tom Keaton
- Zachery Ty Bryan - Val Massey
- Sherry Miller - Lisa Gallagher
- John Furey - Reed Gallagher
- Bruce Gray - Ed Kramer
- Kim Schraner - Kelly Savage
- Kris Holden-Ried - Karl Hrynluk
- Jocelyn Snowdon - Emma Chavez
- Callahan Connor - Angus Kilbourn
- Natasha La Force - Taylor Kilbourn
- Zachary Bennett - Zack
- Pamela Wallin - Herself
- Jean Yoon - Officer Lau
- D'Arcy Smith - Uniformed Police Officer
