= The Last Brickmaker in America =

- Film poster
- Written by: Richard Leder
- Directed by: Gregg Champion
- Starring: Sidney Poitier; Piper Laurie; Jay O. Sanders; Wendy Crewson; Julian Adams; Mary Alice
- Music by: Joseph Conlan
- Country of origin: United States
- Original language: English

Production
- Producers: Derek Kavanagh; James Nasser; Eric Parkinson; Marla A. White
- Cinematography: Gorden Lansdale
- Editor: Gib Jaffe
- Running time: 88 minutes
- Production company: Nasser Group

Original release
- Network: CBS
- Release: September 23, 2001

The Last Brickmaker in America is a 2001 American drama television film directed by Gregg Champion and written by Richard Leder featuring Sidney Poitier, Piper Laurie, Jay O. Sanders, Wendy Crewson, Julian Adams, Mary Alice, the film was released on September 23, 2001 and is available for streaming on Tubi. It is produced by Nasser Entertainment and distributed by Empire Home Entertainment. This was Poitier's final acting role before his death in January 2022.

== Cast ==
- Sidney Poitier as Henry Cobb
- Piper Laurie as Ruth Anne
- Jay O. Sanders as Mike
- Wendy Crewson as Karen
- Mert Hatfield as Bank chairman Charlie Redden
- Cody Newton as Danny Potter
- Rebecca Koon as Ms. Abbott
- Julian Adams as Flower Shop Patron
- Mary Alice as Dorothy Cobb
- Bernie Casey as Lewis
- Sharon Davis as School Administrator
- Duke Ernsberger as Principal Robert Keenan
- Dennis Gomez as Construction worker
- Fred Griffith as Teacher
- Joseph Kimray as Choir Member
- Terry Loughlin as Dr. Hayward
- Terry Norman as Ms. Walters
- Tom Nowicki as Carl Douglass

== Production ==
=== Filming ===
The film was shot in Gastonia, North Carolina.
