= Joanne Kilbourn =

Joanne Killbourn
- First appearance: Deadly Appearances
- Created by: Gail Bowen
- Portrayed by: Wendy Crewson

In-universe information
- Gender: Female
- Occupation: Political strategist, political science professor, political commentator
- Nationality: Canadian

Joanne Kilbourn is a fictional Canadian detective, who appears in mystery novels by Gail Bowen.

== Overview ==
In Deadly Appearances, the first Kilbourn novel, she is a political strategist and advisor to Andy Boychuk, a politician who is murdered just hours after being elected Leader of the Opposition in the Legislative Assembly of Saskatchewan. Kilbourn is forced to solve his murder while contending with the fact that the murderer is attempting to kill her too. In later novels, Kilbourn subsequently changes careers, becoming a political science professor in Regina, and later serves as a political commentator with a local television station. In the course of the later novels, she solves crimes committed both within the academic community and throughout the province of Saskatchewan.

Kilbourn is also a widow, whose husband was himself murdered several years before the events of Deadly Appearances. In A Colder Kind of Death, she is forced to investigate the killing of her late husband's murderer.

== Adaptations ==
Six of the Kilbourn mysteries were adapted for television by Shaftesbury Films and CTV. Wendy Crewson played Kilbourn. Victor Garber, and later Shawn Doyle played her police assistants.

List of films

- Love and Murder (2000) (adapted from Murder at the Mendel)
- Deadly Appearances (2000)
- The Wandering Souls Murders (2001)
- A Colder Kind of Death (2001)
- A Killing Spring (2002)
- Verdict in Blood (2002)

== Joanne Kilbourn mysteries ==
- Deadly Appearances, 1990
- Murder at the Mendel, 1991
- The Wandering Soul Murders, 1992
- A Colder Kind of Death, 1994
- A Killing Spring, 1996
- Verdict in Blood, 1998
- Burying Ariel, 2000
- The Glass Coffin, 2002
- The Last Good Day, 2004
- The Endless Knot, 2006
- The Brutal Heart, 2008
- The Nesting Dolls, 2010
- Kaleidoscope, 2012
- The Gifted, 2013
- 12 Rose Street, 2015
- What's Left Behind, 2016
- Winner's Circle, 2017
- A Darkness of the Heart, 2018
- The Unlocking Season, 2020
- An Image in the Lake, 2021
- What's Past Is Prologue, 2022
- The Legacy, 2023
- The Solitary Friend, 2025
