= Abby Ross =

Canadian actress (born 1997)

Abby Ross is a Canadian actress, known for her roles as Midge Klump in the seventh season of Riverdale and as young Emma Swan in the show Once Upon a Time.

Ross began attending theatre camps when she was 8, In 2013, she landed her first prominent role in the Canadian sitcom Seed, which ran for two seasons before being cancelled in 2014. In 2015, she starred as Tori Spelling in Lifetime's The Unauthorized Beverly Hills, 90210 Story.

Ross joined the cast of Riverdale when actress Emilija Baranac, who originated the role for the first two seasons, was unable to reprise her role. Ross previously made a guest appearance in Chilling Adventures of Sabrina created by Riverdale showrunner Roberto Aguirre-Sacasa, who extended an invitation to Ross to audition for the role of Klump.
