= Beverley Breuer =

Canadian actress

- Born: Beverley Nordquist; Regina, Saskatchewan, Canada
- Occupation: Actress
- Years active: 1999–present
- Spouses: Jacob-George Breuer (m. 1973; div. 2002) Lee Binns (m. 2007)

Beverley Breuer is a Canadian actress who has worked in television and film.

== Filmography ==
=== Film ===
Year	Title	Role	Notes
2002	Bang Bang You're Dead	Laundry Woman	
2003	Little Brother of War	Eva Scott	
2003	Scary Movie 3	Tracheotomy Wife	
2004	Miracle	Party Wife	
2004	Savage Island	Beth Young	
2006	Truth	Denise Sweeny	Direct-to-video
2006	Firewall	Sandra	
2006	Dr. Dolittle 3	Mrs Taylor	Direct-to-video
2006	Scary Movie 4	Blonde Woman in Alien Basket	
2007	Numb	Secretary	
2007	Martian Child	Mrs Tompkins	
2019	My Mother's Stalker	Mrs Hodges	
TBA	Thoughts and Prayers	Grace	Short film

=== Television ===
Year	Title	Role	Notes
1999	The New Addams Family	Mrs Sneed	2 episodes
2000	Mysterious Ways	Elaine Westmore	Episode: "Handshake"
2000, 2002	Cold Squad	Mrs. Johnson / Barbie	2 episodes
2001	The Lone Gunmen	Carol Shantz	Episode: "Madam, I'm Adam"
2001	Smallville	Rose Greer	Episode: "X-Ray"
2001–2002	Pasadena	Jane	3 episodes
2002	The Dead Zone	Diner Waitress	Episode: "What It Seems"
2002	Beyond Belief: Fact or Fiction	Judith Bartel	2 episodes
2002	Breaking News	Karen Pilote	2 episodes
2002	No Night Is Too Long	Connie Dorral	Television film
2003	John Doe	Wife	Episode: "John D.O.A."
2003	Twelve Mile Road	Henrietta Coffey	Television film
2004	Da Vinci's Inquest	Gloria Keane's Sister	Episode: "Out of the Bag and All Over the Street"
2004	The Chris Isaak Show	Woman	Episode: "Home Improvement"
2004	Cooking Lessons	Nadia	Television film
2004, 2007	The L Word	Marian / Ms Rapson	2 episodes
2005	Terminal City	Hospital Administrator	Episode 4
2005	Masters of Horror	Janet Hofstadter	Episode: "Homecoming"
2006	Godiva's	Bank Manager	Episode: "The Fifth Taste"
2006	Alice, I Think	Dr Irene	Episode: "Paintball"
2006	Stargate SG-1	Barkeep	Episode: "The Quest: Part 1"
2006	Reunion	Judge Litfield	Episode: "1997" (Unaired)
2015	Perfect Match	Francine	Television film
2016	A December Bride	Meredith Murphy	Television film
2017	Murder, She Baked: Just Desserts	Mrs Rutledge	Television film series Episode: "Just Desserts"
2017	Imposters	Frenzied Shopper	Episode: "Always Forward, Never Back"
2017	Christmas in the Air	Sheila Hennessey	Television film
2017–2019, 2023	Riverdale	Sister Woodhouse	10 episodes
2018	Love on the Slopes	Norah	Television film
2018	Reunited at Christmas	Madeline Murphy	Television film
2019	Arrow	Irene Clayton	Episode: "Star City Slayer"
2019	My Mom's Letter from Heaven	Rosalind	Television film
2019	To Have and to Hold	Evelyn Evans	Television film
2019	Identity Theft of a Cheerleader	Ms Christie	Television film
TBA	V.C. Andrews' Pearl in the Mist	Mrs Gray	Television film Filming
