= Midge Klump =

- Archie Comics character
- First appearance: Jughead Comics #5 (April, 1951)
- Created by: Dan DeCarlo
- Voiced by: Jill Anderson
- Portrayed by: Susan Blu; Debi Derryberry (Archie: To Riverdale and Back Again); Emilija Baranac and Abby Ross (Riverdale)
- Hometown: Riverdale
- School: Riverdale High School

In-universe information
- Significant others: Moose Mason; Jughead Jones

Midge Klump is a fictional character appearing in Archie Comics. She frequently appears as the girlfriend of Moose Mason and the unrequited crush of Reggie Mantle. The live-action version of Midge was portrayed by Emilija Baranac in the television take on Archie Comics produced by The CW, Riverdale.

== History ==
Midge was created to serve as Moose's girlfriend, debuting in Jughead #5 in 1951. Her birthday is said to be on July 4.

Like other characters, Midge evolves from a similar character. Originally, Moose dated a blonde girl named Lottie Little, who was replaced by Midge. For many years, Midge has a more petite build than the other girls in the comics, sharpening the contrast between herself and Moose. In later stories, however, she is as tall as her friends, with only her short dark hair making her identifiable.

== Relationships ==
Midge is Moose Mason's longtime girlfriend. Moose is deeply protective of Midge, and if he feels threatened about their relationship, any boy seen talking to her will end up enduring his wrath. Midge's reactions to this vary from story to story.

She is occasionally annoyed by his violent jealousy, and dislikes being avoided by all of Riverdale's boys because of it. However, because of Moose's possessiveness over her, she has a "taboo" aspect to her that many of the young gentlemen in Riverdale find extremely appealing. Despite her aggravation with Moose's overprotection of her, whenever another girl shows interest in Moose she reacts with the same jealousy.

At other times, Midge purposely makes Moose Mason jealous by flirting with or dating other boys. Originally, she flirted with all of them equally, but by the late 1960s, Reggie Mantle was the most frequent. Midge usually inadvertently, though thoughtlessly, sets Reggie up to be beaten up by Moose when she flirts with him. Occasionally Midge herself loses patience with Reggie. At such times, when Reggie shows up with a black eye or other evidence of having been harmed, Moose sees this and denies attacking Reggie—it turns out Midge did it.

Her closest friends are Betty Cooper and Veronica Lodge. Other girls she is friends with include Nancy Woods and Big Ethel. Her relationship with them is much more stable than with the boys, though Veronica's constant bragging often gets on her nerves.

In the Archie Marries Betty storyline, which takes place in a possible future, Midge finally tires of Moose's jealousy and breaks up with him for good. She subsequently becomes close to Jughead (who now owns the Chock'lit Shoppe), and they soon fall in love. Later in the story, it's revealed that they're now married, and Midge is pregnant with their first child.

In the Riverdale Rescue game, Midge is one of a few main characters that can form romantic relationships with both boys and girls.

== Interests ==
Few of Midge's interests are mentioned in the comics. However, she is known to have athletic skills, and plays on the Riverdale softball team, in addition to being a cheerleader. Midge and her girlfriends enjoy activities together, such as shopping at the Riverdale Mall. In an episode of Archie's Weird Mysteries, Midge revealed that she wants to be a stuntwoman; in the TV movie Archie: To Riverdale and Back Again, she became a chiropractor, and shares a practice with Moose. The comics, however, show no basis for an interest in either career.

== Alternate versions ==
In Afterlife with Archie, Midge attends the school Halloween dance when the zombie apocalypse starts. When a zombified Jughead attacks the school dance, she and the others escape to Veronica Lodge's home. They decide to go swimming to take their minds off of things. In private, Midge confides in Moose that she got a cut on her hand during the confusion at the school dance, although she doesn't know from whom. She disinfects the wound and when Moose tries to convince her to tell the others she reassures his fears that she'll turn by saying it would've already happened by now. She curls up with Moose and tells him that she loves him. When next they are seen, Midge and Moose have both turned into zombies and attack their friends who are in the pool. Smithers activates the aluminum pool cover, trapping the two zombified lovers in there. Reggie Mantle later revealed to Kevin Keller the reason he hit Hot Dog in the first place is because he was distracted and frustrated about Midge asking him for money so she could get an abortion.

== In other media ==
=== Television ===
==== Animated ====
- Midge appeared briefly in an episode segment of Sabrina the Teenage Witch (1970 TV series) as a cheerleader.
- Midge appeared in Archie's Weird Mysteries voiced by Jill Anderson.

==== Live action ====
- Midge appears in The Archie Situation Comedy and Musical Variety Show (1978), portrayed by Susan Blu. She is a keyboardist for The Archies.
- Midge appears in the TV movie Archie: To Riverdale and Back Again portrayed by Debi Derryberry. She and Moose are married, having a son and a successful chiropractic business.
- Midge appears in season 2 of Riverdale, a drama series for The CW portrayed by Emilija Baranac. Midge was killed by the villainous Black Hood at the end of "Chapter Thirty-One: A Night to Remember". Midge returns in season 7, as a 1955 character portrayed by Abby Ross.

=== Film ===
- Midge appeared in The Archies in Jugman, voiced by Jill Anderson. The film was released direct-to-video and takes place after Archie's Weird Mysteries.
