= Gail Bowen =

Canadian playwright and writer (1942–2026)

Gail Bowen SOM
- Born: Gail Dianne Bartholomew; September 22, 1942; Toronto, Ontario, Canada
- Died: June 25, 2026 (aged 83); Regina, Saskatchewan, Canada
- Occupations: Author, playwright
- Spouse: Ted Bowen (m. 1972)
- Children: 3
- Writing career
- Years active: 1986–2026
- Genres: Mystery fiction, theatre
- Notable work: Joanne Kilbourn series
- Website: www.gailbowen.com

Gail Dianne Bowen SOM (née Bartholomew; September 22, 1942 – June 25, 2026) was a Canadian playwright, writer of mystery novels and educator.

== Life and career ==
Born in Toronto, Ontario, Bowen was educated at the University of Toronto, where she earned a Bachelor of Arts degree in 1964. She then studied at the University of Waterloo, where she received a master's degree in 1975, and the University of Saskatchewan. She subsequently taught English in Saskatchewan, and was associate professor of English at First Nations University of Canada before retiring from teaching. She thereafter lived in Regina, Saskatchewan.

Bowen's mystery novels feature Joanne Kilbourn, a widowed mother, political analyst and university professor who finds herself occasionally involved in criminal investigations in various parts of Saskatchewan. Many have been adapted as Canadian television movies by Shaftesbury Films.

Several of her plays have been produced, including Dancing in Poppies, an adaptation of Beauty and the Beast, The Tree and an adaptation of Peter Pan, all premiering at the Globe Theatre in Regina. Her radio play Dr. Dolittle was broadcast on CBC Radio in 2006. She wrote The World According to Charlie D., a radio play focusing on the radio talk show host from her Joanne Kilbourn mysteries, broadcast on CBC Radio in 2007. A follow-up episode about Charlie D. aired in August 2008 as part of the WorldPlay series, airing on public radio networks in six English-speaking countries. In 2010, the first of a series of mystery novellas about Charlie D. was published.

Bowen was selected as the writer-in-residence for the Regina Public Library from September 2013 to May 2014. She had previously served as writer in residence at the Toronto Reference Library (2009) and Calgary's Memorial Park Library (2010).

She was appointed a Member of the Saskatchewan Order of Merit (SOM) in 2018.

Bowen died from cancer on June 25, 2026, at the age of 83.

== Bibliography ==
=== Novels ===
- 1919: The Love Letters of George and Adelaide (1986) Western Producer Prairie Books

==== Charlie D novels ====
- Love You to Death (2010) Orca Book Publishers - Rapid Reads
- One Fine Day You're Gonna Die (2010) Orca Book Publishers - Rapid Reads
- The Shadow Killer (2011) Orca Book Publishers - Rapid Reads
- The Thirteenth Rose (2013) Orca Book Publishers - Rapid Reads

==== Joanne Kilbourn novels ====
- Deadly Appearances (1990) Douglas & McIntyre
- Murder at the Mendel (1991, published in the US as Love and murder) Douglas & McIntyre
- The Wandering Soul Murders (1992) Douglas & McIntyre
- A Colder Kind of Death (1994, winner of the Arthur Ellis Award) McClelland & Stewart
- A Killing Spring (1996) McClelland & Stewart
- Verdict in Blood (1998) McClelland & Stewart
- Burying Ariel (2000) McClelland & Stewart
- The Glass Coffin (2002) McClelland & Stewart
- The Last Good Day (2004) McClelland & Stewart
- The Endless Knot (2006) McClelland & Stewart
- The Brutal Heart (2008) McClelland & Stewart
- The Nesting Dolls (2010) McClelland & Stewart
- Kaleidoscope (2012) McClelland & Stewart
- The Gifted (2013) McLelland & Stewart
- 12 Rose Street (2015) McClelland & Stewart
- What's Left Behind (2016) McClelland & Stewart
- The Winner's Circle (2017) McClelland & Stewart
- A Darkness of the Heart (2018) McClelland & Stewart
- The Unlocking Season (2020) ECW Press
- An Image in the Lake (2021)
- What's Past is Prologue (2022)
- The Legacy (2023)
- The Solitary Friend (2025)

=== Plays ===
- Dancing in Poppies (1993)
- Beauty and the Beast (1993)
- The Tree (1994)
- Peter Pan (1998 adaptation) Canadian singer/songwriter Fred Penner portrayed Captain Hook in a 2000 production also with composer/actor Derek Aasland as Peter Pan.

== See also ==
- List of University of Waterloo people
