= Riverdale season 5 =

Season of television series

Riverdale
- Season 5
- DVD cover
- Starring: KJ Apa; Lili Reinhart; Camila Mendes; Cole Sprouse; Marisol Nichols; Madelaine Petsch; Mark Consuelos; Casey Cott; Charles Melton; Vanessa Morgan; Drew Ray Tanner; Erinn Westbrook; Skeet Ulrich; Mädchen Amick
- No. of episodes: 19

Release
- Original network: The CW
- Original release: January 20 – October 6, 2021

Season chronology
- ← Previous; Season 4 Next → Season 6

The fifth season of Riverdale premiered on The CW on January 20, 2021 and concluded on October 6, 2021 with a total of 19 episodes. The series was based on the characters from the Archie Comics, created by Maurice Coyne, Louis Silberkleit, and John L. Goldwater, and was created by Roberto Aguirre-Sacasa.

The principal cast included KJ Apa, Lili Reinhart, Camila Mendes, Cole Sprouse, Madelaine Petsch, Mädchen Amick, Mark Consuelos, Casey Cott, Charles Melton and Vanessa Morgan returning from the previous season. Drew Ray Tanner was promoted to series regular after appearing as a recurring star on the previous 3 seasons and Erinn Westbrook join the main cast as new character and Pop Tate's granddaughter, Tabitha Tate. Skeet Ulrich was only credited as part of the main cast during the first 3 episodes of the season and left the series after the third episode; and Nichols is only credited as a main cast member on the episodes in which she appears.

The season begins with the last days of Archie, Betty, Veronica, Jughead and the rest of the gang at Riverdale High. As they prepare for their graduation, they try to solve the mystery of "The Auteur," the mysterious person that has been sending disturbing videotapes to every citizen doorstep of Riverdale, while also dealing with some goodbyes, break-ups and their future life on college. Starting from the fourth episode of the season, there is a seven-year time jump, where the gang returns to Riverdale as young adults to escape their troubled pasts and also to save the town from being dissolved by Hiram Lodge.

On February 3, 2021, The CW renewed the show for a sixth season.

== Episodes ==
No. overall	No. in season	Title	Directed by	Written by	Original release date	Prod. code	U.S. viewers (millions)
77	1	"Chapter Seventy-Seven: Climax"	Pamela Romanowsky	Ace Hasan & Greg Murray	January 20, 2021	T13.22701	0.63
Betty and Jughead investigate snuff films, leading them to secret screenings by Blue Velvet's owner, David. To gain entry, Betty delivers a fake film but later surrenders a real one involving her father. Archie loses a boxing match against KO Kelly for a Naval Academy spot. Cheryl faces family disapproval in her relationship with Toni. At a rave, Betty and Jughead discover disturbing snuff films featuring the gang. Veronica learns about Archie and Betty's kiss, leading to their breakup at prom. A livestream depicts the gang killing David, and Cheryl and Toni part ways after prom. Veronica reveals Archie's infidelity to her parents. Archie finds a videotape recreating his encounter with the Black Hood at home.
78	2	"Chapter Seventy-Eight: The Preppy Murders"	Gabriel Correa	Janine Salinas Schoenberg & Devon Turner	January 27, 2021	T13.22702	0.52
Archie grapples with emotions after watching a disturbing videotape and is asked to write a letter for a lesser sentence for Fred's killer, George Augustine. Jughead and Betty initially suspect David in Bret's prison murder, only to discover he was hanged in the Lodge's cabin. Cheryl's attempt to secure a sanctuary for the Uktena tribe leads Penelope to deadly action. Hermosa intervenes as the Molloy family targets Veronica. Together with Hermione, they plot to force Hiram into retirement, leading to Hermione's decision to divorce him. A new tape hints at the auteur's presence, prompting Betty and Jughead to confront Charles. However, they realize Jellybean and friends were behind the tapes, expressing their discontent with Jughead leaving town.
79	3	"Chapter Seventy-Nine: Graduation"	Gabriel Correa	Roberto Aguirre-Sacasa	February 3, 2021	T13.22703	0.54
As graduation nears, Archie discovers he must repeat his senior year but is still allowed to walk with his classmates. FP decides to move back to Toledo with Jellybean, and the gang graduates. Archie, struggling with Fred's absence, decides to join the Army. FP and Jellybean leave, and the gang buries a time capsule. Cheryl opts out of college and ends things with Toni. Archie announces his Army decision, and the gang bids farewell. Veronica vacations with Hermione, Betty confesses to kissing Archie, and Jughead moves out. One year later, Jughead waits at Pop's for the gang, but they don't show. The gang reunites six years later, drawn together by another mystery.
80	4	"Chapter Eighty: Purgatorio"	Steven A. Adelson	Roberto Aguirre-Sacasa	February 10, 2021	T13.22704	0.48
Seven years post-graduation, Archie returns from the army to a struggling Riverdale. Betty is an FBI agent, Veronica is married to Chadwick Gekko, Jughead faces writer's block and debts, and Kevin is now a teacher dating Fangs. Toni is a pregnant guidance counselor, and Reggie works for Hiram, who's reshaping the town. Pop's retirement reveals a drug den, and Archie learns of mysterious disappearances on the highway. Desperate to save Riverdale, he calls Betty, Veronica, and Jughead back for a reunion. Meanwhile, a waitress is picked up by a suspicious trucker, adding to the town's growing mystery.
81	5	"Chapter Eighty-One: The Homecoming"	Steven A. Adelson	Michael Grassi	February 17, 2021	T13.22705	0.59
Upon returning, the gang discovers Riverdale High is at risk due to teachers and students defecting to Stonewall Prep. Betty finds Polly sneaking in late at night, suspecting drug use. Archie and Betty raid the Andrews house, finding evidence to send them to jail. They clean up, have a moment, and decide to become temporary teachers to save Riverdale High. Jughead, facing debt and writer's block, asks Tabitha for a job at Pop's. Veronica deals with Chad's control issues. Archie persuades the gang to teach, as Riverdale High is privatized by Cheryl, with Hiram dissolving the town. Polly, having run away, is chased by a truck.
82	6	"Chapter Eighty-Two: Back to School"	Gabriel Correa	Ariana Jackson	February 24, 2021	T13.22706	0.60
The gang starts teaching at Riverdale High, facing Hiram and Reggie's attempts to further harm the town. Polly is missing, and Toni reveals she was meeting a trucker for sex. Betty and Alice find Polly's belongings on the Lonely Highway. Archie seeks funding for the football team from Veronica, whose husband Chad visits. Doris Bell becomes an informant for Cheryl and Hiram. Veronica plans a jewelry store, and Betty and Archie struggle to find private spaces. Tabitha aids Jughead with his book, leading to tales of Moth Men in the woods. The search for Polly leads to Swedlow Swamp, and Jughead warns Archie of fires near their home.
83	7	"Chapter Eighty-Three: Fire in the Sky"	Gabriel Correa	Ted Sullivan	March 10, 2021	T13.22707	0.52
Betty, Alice, and Kevin take an unidentified body from Swedlow Swamp to the morgue, suspecting it's Margaret, missing for years. Veronica builds her jewelry store with students, combating Hiram's interference. Archie reinstates the Fire Department but faces a visit from Corporal Jackson. Cheryl and Toni coach the Vixens but clash. Jughead and Tabitha discover a disfigured Moth Man corpse in Nana Rose's maple barrel. During a late shift at Pop's, Jughead sees a mysterious light, blacking out. The corpse disappears, raising more questions. Betty, realizing women are missing from nearby towns, suspects a serial killer is at large.
84	8	"Chapter Eighty-Four: Lock & Key"	Rachel Talalay	Arabella Anderson	March 17, 2021	T13.22708	0.45
Jughead grapples with potential alien encounters, seeing hallucinations at Riverdale High and his house. Kevin and Fangs announce their engagement but Kevin struggles. Cheryl, upset, hosts a key party, causing tensions. Archie and Chad's clash prompts Veronica to file for divorce. Cheryl reveals a nursery to Toni, who is disinterested. Archie and Betty end their affair, and Archie reunites with Veronica. Kevin calls off his engagement, and Cheryl shares a moment with Minerva. Polly calls Betty and Alice from a phone booth, but upon arrival, it's dismantled and covered in blood.
85	9	"Chapter Eighty-Five: Destroyer"	Rob Seidenglanz	Ace Hasan	March 24, 2021	T13.22709	0.46
Archie and Veronica struggle to keep the Bulldogs' spirit alive after they lose several games. Betty receives a call from Glen about the blood discovered on the destroyed phone booth; it is a match to Polly. Betty struggles with realizing that Polly is most likely dead, and tells Alice that Polly's blood was not a match. Meanwhile, Jughead realizes a student in his class may have had encounters with the Moth Men. However, the student leaves town with his parents. Betty and Jughead visit Old Man Dreyfus off of the Lonely Highway, and he is convinced that Polly had an encounter with the Moth Men. Kevin decides to go back to cruising, but hits a roadblock. The Bulldogs face the Stonewall Stallions, and receive a small victory when they score for the first time in the season. Betty goes to the truck stop to save girls and get justice for Polly. Back at home, Betty finds Glen, who tells Alice that Polly's blood was a match.
86	10	"Chapter Eighty-Six: The Pincushion Man"	Gabriel Correa	Chrissy Maroon	March 31, 2021	T13.22710	0.49
Betty discovers Glen's dissertation on her family's darkness and worries about Juniper and Dagwood inheriting it. Archie learns about a shady mission and prepares for Parent Teacher Night with Kevin. Cheryl rejects Hiram and Reggie's offer to buy the Blossom Maple Groves. Jughead takes psychedelic mushrooms to aid writing, and Tabitha agrees to watch over him. Hiram orchestrates a prison breakout, causing chaos. Charles and Chic arrive for a sinister game at the Cooper house, resulting in a violent confrontation. Penelope returns, Frank protects the school, and Reggie burns the maple groves. Veronica faces divorce complications. Jughead has a trippy experience, and Betty takes matters into her own hands. Tabitha finds bloody handprints on Jughead's completed novel in the bunker.
87	11	"Chapter Eighty-Seven: Strange Bedfellows"	Tessa Blake	Aaron Allen	August 11, 2021	T13.22711	0.38
Archie and Kevin work on capturing escaped inmates. Veronica returns, and Archie puts their relationship on hold until her divorce is final. During a robbery at her jewelry store, Veronica faces Darla and Dodger. Tabitha worries about Jughead and seeks Betty's help. Jessica, from New York, drugs them with psychedelic mushrooms to obtain Jughead's manuscript. Hiram and Governor Dooley clash over palladium beneath the prison. Hostages demand palladium, with Veronica as collateral. At Thornhill, Penelope starts a ministry for coping with Jason's death. Cheryl has a revelation and joins. Jughead, living among the homeless, heads back to New York, leaving Tabitha a voicemail about his plans.
88	12	"Chapter Eighty-Eight: Citizen Lodge"	James DeWille	Brian E. Paterson	August 18, 2021	T13.22712	0.47
Reggie, working for Hiram to settle his father's debt, completes his task but opts to continue due to his strained relationship with his father. Hiram agrees, requesting an untraceable gun from Reggie. During the exchange, Hiram reveals his life story as Jaime Luna. After moving to Riverdale, the palladium mines' collapse led him to work shining shoes. Seeking respect, he joined gangster Vittorio Alto, impressed Hermione, and adopted the name Hiram Lodge. When his father learned, Hiram killed Alto's men and took over. Reggie is impressed, but Hiram expresses regret, wishing for reconciliation with his father. Hiram locates Alto, kills him, and urges Reggie to reconcile with his own father.
89	13	"Chapter Eighty-Nine: Reservoir Dogs"	Gabriel Correa	Evan Kyle	August 25, 2021	T13.22713	0.47
Betty and Tabitha develop a plan to lure truckers to Pop's after Betty is prohibited from affiliating with the FBI. Meanwhile, Archie and Eric wrestle with trauma and Frank gives them a dog to help them cope. Later, though, they realize that their dog was in a fighting ring and they target the leader of the dog fights in town. Elsewhere, Reggie and Veronica build business at the jewelry store and aim at poaching investors of SoDale, due to it being a complete scam. Cheryl offers Kevin advice, telling him to reconcile with Fangs, but Fangs has begun dating Moose. Kevin later joins Cheryl and Penelope's ministry. At the Whyte Wyrm, there is a ladies night that helps lure potential suspects in the highway murders in. Betty is eyed by a trucker and baits him under the false pretense of sex. Tabitha tracks her location and he pulls over and tries to kill her with a chainsaw. Betty eventually strikes him with a wrench and they haul him off to keep him hostage.
90	14	"Chapter Ninety: The Night Gallery"	Mädchen Amick	James DeWille	September 1, 2021	T13.22714	0.36
Cheryl unveils four paintings to Minerva, revealing intricate stories. The first depicts Archie leading a palladium-harvesting crew in the reopened mines, causing hallucinations due to carbon monoxide exposure. The second portrays Betty interrogating a captured trucker, suspected serial killer. Despite his suicide, Betty believes he wasn't acting alone. The third painting showcases Jughead's post-high school success aided by Jessica and psychedelic mushrooms. Jughead's spiral begins after a bender and lost three days. Returning to New York, he hallucinates a "Rat King." The last painting captures Cheryl and Minerva's night together before Minerva leaves the country.
91	15	"Chapter Ninety-One: The Return of the Pussycats"	Robin Givens	Ariana Jackson & Evan Kyle	September 8, 2021	T13.22715	0.39
Josie McCoy, an international pop star, returns to Riverdale following her father's death. She reconnects with the gang but initially refuses to help save Riverdale. Reestablishing friendships with Valerie and Melody, and reigniting her relationship with Sweet Pea, she comes to terms with her father's death. The Pussycats reunite, and during a concert, Toni delivers her baby, Anthony. After the performance, The Pussycats, their romantic partners, and Josie's mother decide to return to the tour. Before leaving, they learn her father's death may not have been an accident, sparking differing opinions. Meanwhile, Toni, Tabitha, and Veronica aim to franchise Pop's Diner with help from Veronica's friend, Alexandra Cabot.
92	16	"Chapter Ninety-Two: Band of Brothers"	Robin Givens	Janine Salinas Schoenberg	September 15, 2021	T13.22716	0.45
Archie seeks justice for his army men's deaths. Veronica, with Reggie and Cheryl's help, challenges Chad and Hiram to regain financial stability. Kevin and Cheryl aim to control the ministry, countering Penelope's defiance. Jughead faces consequences for his actions, put on leave from teaching and struggling to meet his book deadline. Maintaining sobriety, he avoids Jessica but loses his agent. Betty poses as Polly on the Lonely Highway, prompting Tabitha's concern and assistance.
93	17	"Chapter Ninety-Three: Dance of Death"	Nathalie Boltt	Devon Turner	September 22, 2021	T13.22717	0.35
As Veronica's divorce approaches, Hiram gives Chad a chance to kill Archie, but he fails. Veronica gets everything in the divorce to save Chad from a murder charge. Kevin leaves the ministry, and an explosion at the mines tests Cheryl's faith. Veronica threatens Hiram for endangering Archie and Eric's lives, sparing him when they survive. Chad attacks Veronica, but she kills him. Jughead and Betty discover inbred Blossoms living in the forest, with Old Man Dreyfus and the captured trucker among them. Lynette Fields' body is stolen, leading to a complex investigation tied to Toni's situation. The group finds Moth Men and a shed with victims in the junkyard. Old Man Dreyfus confesses to the murders, leading Betty to Polly's body in the junkyard. Betty and Alice confirm her identity.
94	18	"Chapter Ninety-Four: Next to Normal"	Ronald Paul Richard	Tessa Leigh Williams	September 29, 2021	T13.22718	0.25
Alice struggles to cope with Polly's death and imagines a world where the Coopers are still a happy family. Betty tries to get her to cope as best she can, but Alice blames Betty for Polly's death and for breaking her promises to return to Riverdale sooner. Meanwhile, Cheryl takes in Britta when she is kicked out of her parents' house. Archie and Veronica break up after Veronica realizes that they are on separate paths. Toni and Fangs declare their love for each other and vow to have each other's backs moving forward. Tabitha lures Jughead into a dinner with her parents, and the two decide to begin a romantic relationship. The gang buries Polly's ashes at the cemetery.
95	19	"Chapter Ninety-Five: Riverdale: RIP (?)"	Gabriel Correa	Roberto Aguirre-Sacasa & Greg Murray	October 6, 2021	T13.22719	0.36
Betty graduates as a Special Agent at the FBI, reopening the Riverdale field office and facing a call from TBK. Veronica vows to exile Hiram for a fire at Pop's. Jughead and Tabitha retaliate by burning the Lodge Ledger office. Toni and Fangs struggle with Serpent control. Cheryl learns of her ancestor's burning and demands an apology. She plans a school on Thornhill and seeks independence from Riverdale. Veronica and Reggie revive their romance, planning a casino. Archie names Tabitha, Toni, Alice, and Frank to the town council for Riverdale's reincorporation. Betty and Archie plan to start a romantic relationship, but a bomb under Archie's bed, placed by Hiram, interrupts. As Hiram drives away, Archie's house explodes in fiery smoke.

== Cast and characters ==
=== Main ===
- KJ Apa as Archie Andrews
- Lili Reinhart as Betty Cooper
- Camila Mendes as Veronica Lodge
- Cole Sprouse as Jughead Jones
- Marisol Nichols as Hermione Lodge (Note: Nichols is credited as a main cast member only on the episodes in which she appears.)
- Madelaine Petsch as Cheryl Blossom
- Mark Consuelos as Hiram Lodge
- Casey Cott as Kevin Keller
- Charles Melton as Reggie Mantle
- Vanessa Morgan as Toni Topaz
- Drew Ray Tanner as Fangs Fogarty
- Erinn Westbrook as Tabitha Tate
- Skeet Ulrich as FP Jones (Note: Ulrich is credited as a main cast member from 5x01 until 5x03, starting from 5x04 onwards, he is no longer credited.)
- Mädchen Amick as Alice Cooper

=== Recurring ===
- Martin Cummins as Tom Keller
- Molly Ringwald as Mary Andrews
- Trinity Likins as Jellybean Jones
- Barbara Wallace as Rose Blossom
- Marion Eisman as Doris Bell
- Peter Bryant as Waldo Weatherbee
- Nikolai Witschl as Dr. Curdle Jr
- Nathalie Boltt as Penélope Blossom
- Jordan Connor as Sweet Pea
- Alvin Sanders as Pop Tate (Note: Sam Darkoh plays a younger version of Pop Tate on the episode Chapter Eighty-Three: Fire in the Sky and Chapter Eighty-Eight: Citizen Lodge.)
- Chris Mason as Chad Gekko
- Sommer Carbuccia as Eric Jackson
- Greyston Holt as Glen Scot
- Peter Kelamis as Samm Pansky
- Tom McBeath as Smithers
- Alix West Lefler as Juniper Cooper
- Bentley Storteboom as Dagwood Cooper
- Adeline Rudolph as Minerva Marble
- Simon Alexander as Kendrick
- Sam Scherzer as David Archer
- Johnnier Mejia as José
- Liam Tait as Rusty

=== Guests ===
- Wyatt Nash as Charles Smith
- Doreen Calderon as Nana Topaz
- Zane Holtz as KO Kelly
- Sean Depner as Bret Weston Wallis
- Luvia Petersen as Brooke
- Birkett Turton as David
- Garfield Wilson as Comandante Carter
- Bernadette Beck as Peaches 'n Cream
- Mishel Prada as Hermosa Lodge
- Ryan Robbins as Frank Andrews
- Sarah Desjardins as Donna Sweett
- Jordan Robinson as Toby
- Billy Wickman as Hunter Malloy
- Daniel Schoepf as Ray Malloy
- Noam Zylberman as Paul Malloy
- Marlon Kazadi as Malcolm Moore
- Arabella Bushnell as Cricket Blossom
- Alexander Lowe as Fester Blossom
- Blake Stadel as George Augustine
- Phoebe Miu as Jessica
- Megan Peta Hill as Cora
- Skylar Radzion as Lynette Fields
- Gardiner Millar as General Taylor
- Tiera Skovbye as Polly Cooper
- Matthew Yang King as Marty Mantle
- Kyra Leroux as Britta Beach
- Ryan Faucett as Bernardo Brigsby
- David LeReaney as Capt. Russell
- Carmen Aguirre as Deanna Harper
- Lucy Hale as Katy Keene (voice)
- Ben Sullivan as Rick
- Anita Wittenberg as Dra. Whitley
- Jude Wilson as Lerman Marshall Logan
- Hart Denton as Chic
- Lochlyn Munro as Hal Cooper (voice)
- Wyatt Nash as Charles Smith

== Production ==
=== Development ===
On January 7, 2020, The CW officially renewed the show for a fifth season. Roberto Aguirre-Sacasa returns as showrunner.

The first 3 episodes of the season were originally conceived to serve as the last 3 episodes of the fourth season, however after a member of the cast or crew came in contact with an individual who tested positive for COVID-19, production of season 4 was shut down after the completion of the nineteenth episode, and was unable to resume due to the rise of the pandemic; and as a result, those episodes were ultimately moved to the beginning of this season.

Aguirre-Sacasa told TVLine about the first 3 episodes "They're big and emotional, and there’s a lot of stuff with the characters that we’re still playing out". About Archie and Betty's storyline, he said "We’ve definitely not seen the last of that story. On a basic level, Veronica and Jughead don’t know anything that happened in the bunker or in Archie’s garage, so there’s still absolutely that to play. [...] But definitely, there are major, major repercussions for what Betty and Archie did that go down at prom, in true teen drama fashion. So no, we haven’t seen the end of that story by a long shot". Aguirre-Sacasa also confirmed a time jump after the first 3 episodes of the season, which was at first believed to be a 5 year time jump, but Lili Reihart later confirmed it's going to be a 7 year jump, adding "I'm psyched about it...I think it will be nice to play an adult".

=== Casting ===
Main cast members, KJ Apa as Archie Andrews, Lili Reinhart as Betty Cooper, Camila Mendes as Veronica Lodge, Cole Sprouse as Jughead Jones, Marisol Nichols as Hermione Lodge, Madelaine Petsch as Cheryl Blossom, Mark Consuelos as Hiram Lodge, Casey Cott as Kevin Keller, Skeet Ulrich as F.P. Jones, Charles Melton as Reggie Mantle, Vanessa Morgan as Toni Topaz and Mädchen Amick as Alice Cooper, all returned from the previous season, while Drew Ray Tanner who played Fangs Fogarty was promoted to series regular after having made recurring appearances through seasons 2-4. They were joined by new cast member Erinn Westbrook as Tabitha Tate, "the ambitious, entrepreneurial granddaughter of Pop Tate, who has come to Riverdale to take over Pop’s Chock’lit Shoppe in the hopes of franchising the iconic diner, even as the town around it struggles to survive". As Morgan was pregnant with her first child during most of the season's filming, the writing team decided to write her pregnancy into the show. Morgan confirmed this on December 19, 2020, when she announced her maternity leave from the show, while also thanking the show runners and writers for "being so accommodating" with her pregnancy.

Nichols and Ulrich were originally set to depart the show after the fourth season, however, Nichols later confirmed she was going to return for season 5 after all, adding "I had a very long talk with Roberto Aguirre-Sacasa [...] And I’m proud to announce that not only will Hermoine be back for season five, but she will be back stronger and better than ever!". Her role was demoted to recurring starting from the episode "Chapter Eighty: Purgatory". Ulrich, on the other hand, only returned to finish filming the episodes from season 4 that moved to this season. He comment on his exit to be because he got "creatively bored", adding "I’m incredibly grateful for the friendships I’ve made on Riverdale, and I will miss seeing everyone on a daily basis, I’m proud to have been part of such a talented group of people, in front of the camera and behind. But I’ve decided that it’s time for me to move on to explore other creative opportunities". His final day on set was on October 15, 2020.

On January 7, 2021, Chris Mason joined the season as the recurring role of Chad Gekko, Veronica's husband after the seven-year time jump, his role was described to be "controlling and jealous".

=== Filming ===
Filming for the fourth season, which was made on Vancouver (British Columbia), was suspended on March 11, 2020 due to the COVID-19 pandemic, which resulted in the final 3 episodes of season 4 being moved to the beginning of this season. On June 24, 2020, Vancouver obtained the official COVID-19 safety guidelines to restart the production of movies and television series. By mid-July, Warner Bros. Television hoped to resume the productions of its shows, including Riverdale, at the end of August. The first script reading, made through Zoom, took place on September 5, 2020. Production of the fifth season finally began in Vancouver on September 14, 2020. The actors were notified a month in advance and carried out 2 weeks of quarantine before starting filming. However, on September 29, filming was temporarily suspended due to delays in receiving the results of the COVID-19 tests of the cast and the crew. Filming resumed on October 17, 2020 and concluded on June 1, 2021.

Reinhart felt that the quarantine gave her time for herself that she "already needed," while returning to filming said "I genuinely feel like a prisoner, going back to work, because I cannot leave Canada," she expressed. "That doesn't feel good. You can't go home for Thanksgiving, can't visit your family. No one can come visit you unless they quarantine for two weeks. It just feels f--ked. Apa revealed through a video on Instagram that one of the protocols of filming during the pandemic was to rinse his mouths for 30 seconds before each make-out scene, which he described as "our new normal."

=== Shared universe ===
In July 2020, showrunner Aguirre-Sacasa stated that there were plans for a crossover between Riverdale and Chilling Adventures of Sabrina (both of which were set in the same universe), to take place in part 5 (season 3) of Sabrina, however, on July 8, 2020 the series was cancelled by Netflix after 2 seasons due to the COVID-19 Pandemic, making Part 4 the final of the show. Zane Holtz reprised his role as KO Kelly from Riverdale's spin-off Katy Keene, following the show's cancellation after its first season.

== Racial controversy ==
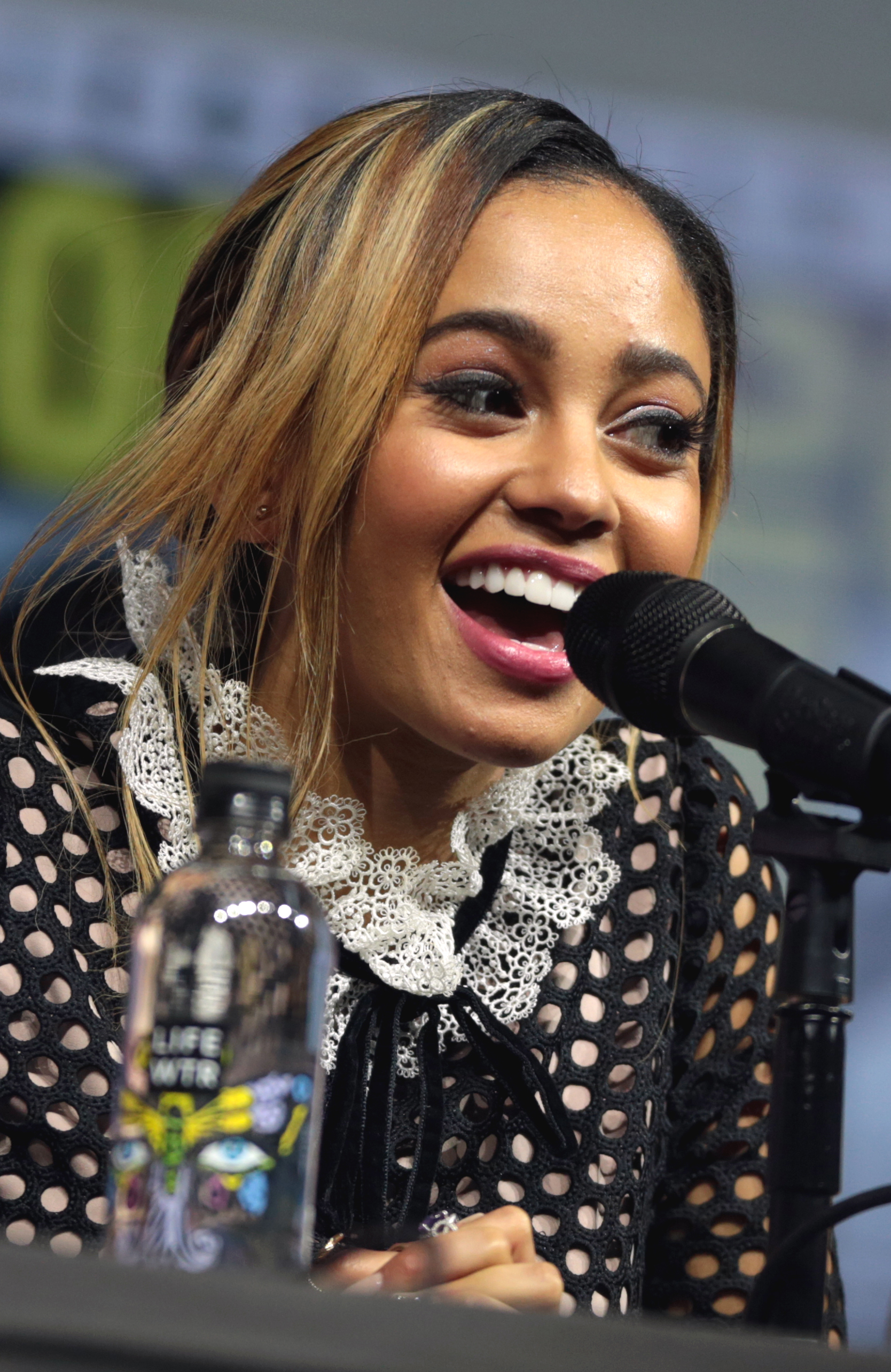
Vanessa Morgan declared having a hard time on how black people was portrayed in media.

On May 31, 2020, Vanessa Morgan defended her ex co-star Ashleigh Murray, after she was accused of being a diva during her time on the show. Morgan stated via a tweet: "You don’t know what the fuck your [sic] talking about and don’t talk about my friend like that. Another thing i [sic] hate BLACK women being called DIVAS for sticking up for themselves. Maybe the show should write for her like the white characters. You picked the wrong day get off my page". Morgan later tweeted about being "Tired of how black people are portrayed in Media, tired of us being portrayed as thugs, dangerous or angry scary people. Tired of us also being used as sidekick non dimensional characters to our white leads. Or only used in the ads for diversity but not actually in the show". She captioned the note with “I’m not being Quite [sic] anymore #BlackLivesMatter.” while claiming to be the least paid actor and, at the time of the tweet, the only black member of the main cast. In another tweet, Morgan clarified, “My role on Riverdale has nothing to do with my fellow castmates/friends. They don’t write the show. So no need to attack them, they don’t call the shots & I know they have my back.”

On June 4, 2020, showrunner Roberto Aguirre-Sacasa responded to the allegations of Morgan, saying "We hear Vanessa. We love Vanessa. She’s right, we’re sorry and we make the same promise to you that we did to her. We will do better to honor her and the character she plays. As well as all of our actors and characters of color. Change is happening and will continue to happen. Riverdale will get bigger, not smaller. Riverdale will be part of the movement, not outside it”, adding “All of the Riverdale writers made a donation to @BLMLA, but we know where the work must happen for us. In the writers’ room.”

On June 28, 2020, Bernadette Beck, who played the recurring character of Peaches 'N Cream on seasons 3 and 4, said she believed she was cast to "fulfill a diversity quota."

== Music ==
Riverdale: Season 5 (Original Television Soundtrack) track listing
No.	Title	Artist(s)	Length
1.	"Carry the Torch"	Camila Mendes	1:46
2.	"Good Riddance"	KJ Apa	2:36
3.	"After Dark"	Drew Ray Tanner and Vanessa Morgan	2:47
4.	"Shallow"	Camila Mendes and Chris Mason	3:18
5.	"Stupid Love"	Madelaine Petsch	3:16
6.	"Walking in Space"	Erinn Westbrook, Lili Reinhart, Madelaine Petsch and Nathalie Boltt	3:38
7.	"Nothin' But a Good Time"	Camila Mendes, Erinn Westbrook, Lili Reinhart, Madelaine Petsch and Mädchen Amick	2:43
8.	"Everything's Alright"	Casey Cott and Madelaine Petsch	3:32

Riverdale: Special Episode - The Return of The Pussycats (Original Television Soundtrack) track listing
No.	Title	Artist(s)	Length
1.	"It's All Coming Back to Me Now"	Ashleigh Murray, Asha Bromfield and Hayley Law	3:34
2.	"It's Gonna Rain"	Ajay. Musodi, Ashleigh Murray, Diandra Lee, Eduardo Vasquez, James Ross, Joshua Lalisan, Julia Schwartz, Kyra Leroux, Quincy Pipella	1:54
3.	"Physical"	Asha Bromfield and Hayley Law	3:14
4.	"Little Shop of Horrors"	Camille Hyde, Erinn Westbrook and Vanessa Morgan	2:24
5.	"Josie and the Pussycats"	Asha Bromfield, Ashleigh Murray and Hayley Law	0:40
6.	"Get Up"	Asha Bromfield, Ashleigh Murray and Hayley Law	2:50
7.	"Stars"	Ashleigh Murray	3:18

Riverdale: Special Episode - Next to Normal the Musical (Original Television Soundtrack) track listing
No.	Title	Artist(s)	Length
1.	"Just Another Day"	Jacquie, Lili Reinhart, Mädchen Amick and Tyson Ritter	3:28
2.	"I Miss the Mountains"	Lili Reinhart and Mädchen Amick	3:44
3.	"Everything Else"	Jacquie, Lili Reinhart and Mädchen Amick	1:52
4.	"Perfect For You"	Cole Sprouse and Erinn Westbrook	2:05
5.	"Superboy and the Invisible Girl"	Camila Mendes	1:53
6.	"It's Gonna Be Good"	Jacquie, Lili Reinhart, Mädchen Amick and Tyson Ritter	1:29
7.	"She's Not Here"	Lili Reinhart	1:20
8.	"I'm Alive"	Jacquie and Tyson Ritter	3:15
9.	"I Am the One"	Jacquie, Lili Reinhart and Tyson Ritter	3:19
10.	"Didn't I See This Movie"	Madelaine Petsch	1:00
11.	"I've Been"	Casey Cott and Lili Reinhart	2:44
12.	"Make Up Your Mind/Catch Me I'm Falling"	Camila Mendes, Casey Cott, Lili Reinhart and Vanessa Morgan	3:00
13.	"Hey #3/Perfect For You (reprise)"	Cole Sprouse, Erinn Westbrook	2:23
14.	"A Promise"	Lili Reinhart	2:12
15.	"Maybe (Next to Normal)"	Lili Reinhart and Mädchen Amick	3:02
16.	"Light"	Camila Mendes, Casey Cott, Drew Ray Tanner, Erinn Westbrook, KJ Apa, Kyra Leroux, Lili Reinhart, Madelaine Petsch, Mädchen Amick, Ryan Robbins and Vanessa Morgan	4:23

== Release ==
The first promotional poster was released on August 17, 2020. On November 24, the showrunner revealed another poster with the caption "Nothing remains buried forever." On December 8, promotional images of a large part of the main cast at the prom were released. The next day, the first official trailer was released.

The season premiered on The CW on January 20, 2021 and the mid-season finale was released on March 31, 2021. The second half of the season was at first schedule to premiere on July 7, 2021, however, on April 29 it was announced the date was pushed back to August 11. The complete season was released on DVD on January 18, 2022 by Warner Archives.

== DVD Release ==
Riverdale: The Complete Fifth Season
Set Details		Special Feature
19 episodes; 4-disc set; English (5.1 Dolby Digital); English SDH subtitles; Runtime: 810 minutes		Featurette: The Riverdale Mythology: A New Riverdale
Release Dates
Region 1	Region 2	Region 4
January 18, 2022	TBA	February 2, 2022

== Reception ==
=== Critical Response ===
On review aggregator website Rotten Tomatoes, the fifth season holds an approval rating of 78% based on 9 reviews, and an average rating of 6.2/10.

=== Audience ===
Viewership and ratings per episode of Riverdale season 5
No.	Title	Air date	Rating (18–49)	Viewers (millions)	DVR (18–49)	DVR viewers (millions)	Total (18–49)	Total viewers (millions)
1	"Chapter Seventy-Seven: Climax"	January 20, 2021	0.1	0.63	0.2	—N/a	0.3	—N/a
2	"Chapter Seventy-Eight: The Preppy Murders"	January 27, 2021	0.1	0.52	—N/a	—N/a	—N/a	—N/a
3	"Chapter Seventy-Nine: Graduation"	February 3, 2021	0.1	0.54	0.2	0.36	0.3	0.90
4	"Chapter Eighty: Purgatorio"	February 10, 2021	0.1	0.48	0.3	—N/a	0.4	—N/a
5	"Chapter Eighty-One: The Homecoming"	February 17, 2021	0.2	0.59	—N/a	—N/a	—N/a	—N/a
6	"Chapter Eighty-Two: Back to School"	February 24, 2021	0.2	0.60	0.2	—N/a	0.4	—N/a
7	"Chapter Eighty-Three: Fire in the Sky"	March 10, 2021	0.1	0.52	0.1	—N/a	0.2	—N/a
8	"Chapter Eighty-Four: Lock & Key"	March 17, 2021	0.1	0.45	—N/a	—N/a	—N/a	—N/a
9	"Chapter Eighty-Five: Destroyer"	March 24, 2021	0.2	0.46	—N/a	—N/a	—N/a	—N/a
10	"Chapter Eighty-Six: The Pincushion Man"	March 31, 2021	0.1	0.49	0.3	0.33	0.4	0.82
11	"Chapter Eighty-Seven: Strange Bedfellows"	August 11, 2021	0.1	0.38	0.2	0.37	0.2	0.75
12	"Chapter Eighty-Eight: Citizen Lodge"	August 18, 2021	0.1	0.47	0.1	0.32	0.2	0.79

No DVR ratings are available after the twelfth episode.
