= Alix West Lefler =

Canadian child actress (born 2011)

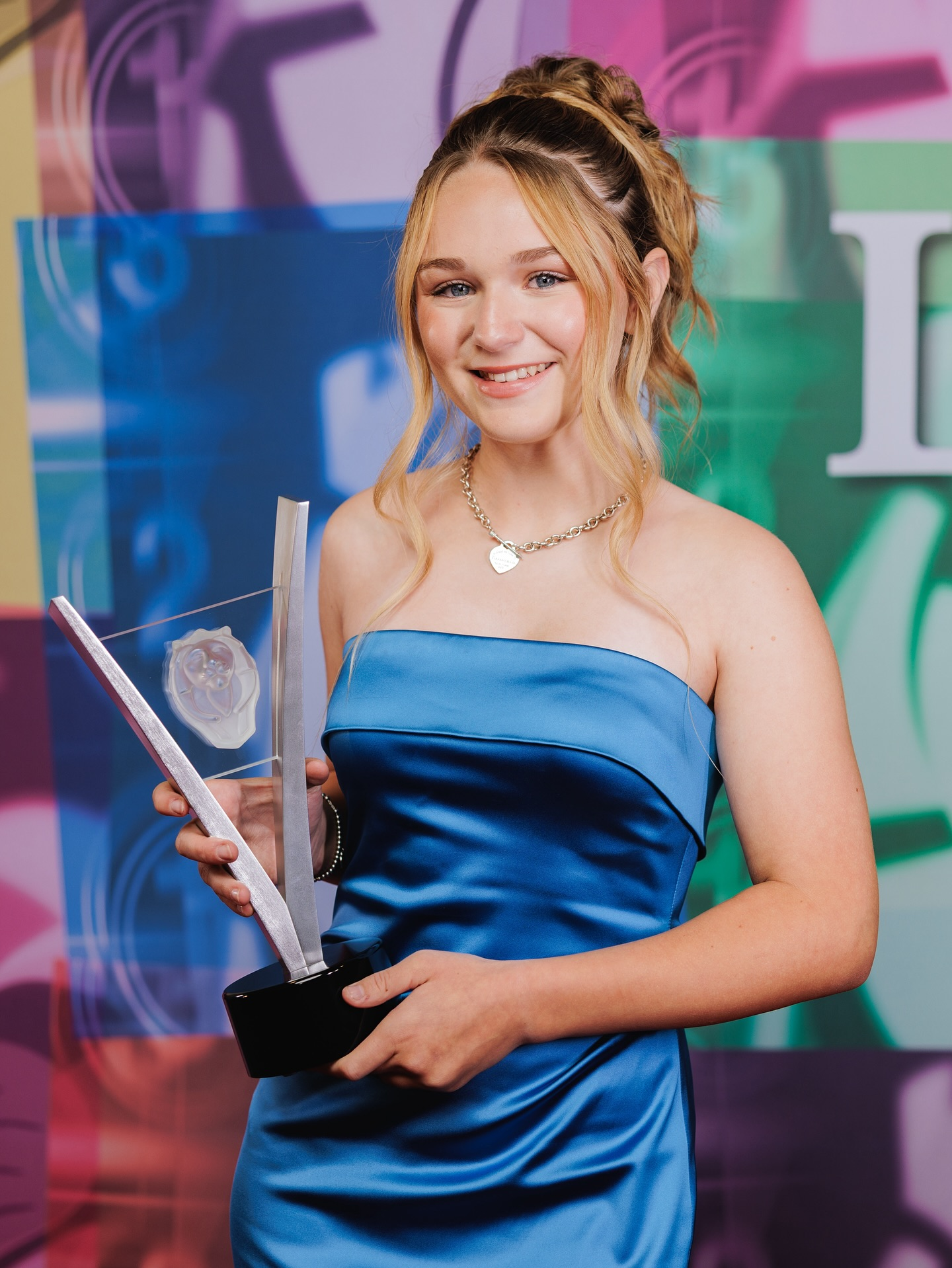
- Lefler in 2025
- Born: August 15, 2011 (age 15); Burnaby, Canada
- Occupation: Actress
- Years active: 2020–present

Alix West Lefler (born August 15, 2011) is a Canadian child actress. She rose to prominence with her role of Alex Loughren in thriller film The Good Nurse (2022). Other roles include Isla in The King Tide (2023) and Agnes Dalton in Speak No Evil (2024). In television, she is best known for her roles of Parker Walter in My Life with the Walter Boys (2023–present), Juniper Cooper in Riverdale (2021–2022) and Genevieve Maisonette in Fire Country (2024).

== Early life ==
Alix West Lefler was born in Burnaby, Canada on August 15, 2011. Her father is from New Zealand. Her family is involved in the lumberjack competition circuit, where she started throwing foam axes at age four and later competed in axe throwing and log rolling events. At 7, she had her first role on a local play by a logger companion and then, she joined Biz Studios for acting lessons, eventually transitioning to the LeBlanc School of Acting.

== Career ==
Lefler began acting in 2020 playing Ruby in The Good Doctor and Hope in Siren. She had also appeared in several television films. In 2021, Lefler played Juniper Cooper in Riverdale (2021–2022). She also played a young Eleanor Wright in Resident Alien (2021–2025).

Her first onscreen role was Alex Loughren in The Good Nurse (2022). In 2023, she played Parker Walter in Netflix's My Life with the Walter Boys (2023–present). Lefler made her film debut in The King Tide (2023) as Isla. In 2024, she played Agnes Dalton in horror film, Speak No Evil. She also played Genevieve Maisonette in Fire Country (2024).

== Filmography ==
Key
| † | Denotes films that have not yet been released |

=== Film ===
| Year | Title | Role | Notes |
|---|---|---|---|
| 2020 | Chateau Christmas | Simone | Television film |
| 2020 | Cranberry Christmas | Alice | Television film |
| 2021 | Fishing for love | Arial | Television film |
| 2021 | Time for Them to Come Home for Christmas | Cassey | Television film |
| 2022 | The Good Nurse | Alex Loughren | |
| 2023 | The King Tide | Isla | |
| 2024 | Speak No Evil | Agnes Dalton | |
| 2024 | The Fast Runner | Frida | Short film |
| 2026 | The Bryce Lee Story † | Millie | |

=== Television ===
| Year | Title | Role | Notes |
|---|---|---|---|
| 2020 | The Good Doctor | Ruby | Episode: "Fixation" |
| 2020 | Siren | Hope | 2 episodes |
| 2021–2022 | Riverdale | Juniper Cooper | Recurring role (seasons 5-6) |
| 2021–2025 | Resident Alien | Young Eleanor Wright | 4 episodes |
| 2023–present | My Life with the Walter Boys | Parker Walter | Recurring role; 14 episodes |
| 2024 | Dead Boy Detectives | Emma | Episode: "The Case of Crystal Palace" |
| 2024 | Fire Country | Genevieve Maisonette | Recurring role (seasons 2-3) |

== Awards and nominations ==
| Year | Award | Category | Work | Result | Ref. |
|---|---|---|---|---|---|
| 2019 | The Joey Awards | Best Live Theater Ensemble | Herself | Won | |
| 2020 | The Joey Awards | Best Actress in a Recurring Television Role 6–8 years | Siren | Won | |
| 2020 | The Joey Awards | Most Promising Performer | Herself | Won | |
| 2021 | Young Artist Awards | Best Performance in a TV Movie - Young Actress | Cranberry Christmas | Won | |
| 2021 | Young Artist Awards | Best Performance in a TV Series - Recurring Young Actress | Siren | Nominated | |
| 2022 | The Joey Awards | Best Recurring Performer Portraying a Female in a TV Show 5 to 9 Years | Riverdale | Nominated | |
| 2024 | San Diego Film Critics Society Awards | Best Youth Performance | Speak No Evil | Nominated | |
| 2024 | Leo Awards | Best Youth Performer | The King Tide | Nominated | |
| 2024 | Leo Awards | Best Supporting Performance Motion Picture | The King Tide | Nominated | |
| 2025 | Best Shorts Awards | Actress (Leading) | The Fast Runner | Won | |
| 2025 | Leo Awards | Best Youth Performance | Speak No Evil | Won | |
| 2025 | Leo Awards | Best Supporting Performance Motion Picture | Speak No Evil | Nominated | |
