= List of Riverdale episodes =

Riverdale is an American teen drama television series based on the characters of Archie Comics. The series was adapted for The CW by Archie Comics' chief creative officer Roberto Aguirre-Sacasa, and is produced by Warner Bros. Television and CBS Studios, in association with Berlanti Productions and Archie Comics. Originally conceived as a feature film adaptation for Warner Bros. Pictures, the idea was re-imagined as a television series for Fox. In 2015, development on the project moved to The CW, where the series was ordered for a pilot. Filming takes place in Vancouver, British Columbia. The series debuted on January 26, 2017.

It features an ensemble cast based on the characters of Archie Comics, with KJ Apa in the role of Archie Andrews; Lili Reinhart as Betty Cooper, Camila Mendes as Veronica Lodge, Cole Sprouse as Jughead Jones, the series' narrator, Madelaine Petsch as Cheryl Blossom, Ashleigh Murray as Josie McCoy, Vanessa Morgan as Toni Topaz, Charles Melton as Reggie Mantle and Casey Cott as Kevin Keller. During the course of the series, 137 episodes of Riverdale aired over seven seasons, between January 26, 2017, and August 23, 2023.

== Series overview ==
Season	Episodes	Originally released		Rank	Average viewers (in millions)
Season	Episodes	First released	Last released	Rank	Average viewers (in millions)
1	13	January 26, 2017	May 11, 2017	154	1.69
2	22	October 11, 2017	May 16, 2018	173	2.12
3	22	October 10, 2018	May 15, 2019	166	1.74
4	19	October 9, 2019	May 6, 2020	122	1.35
5	19	January 20, 2021	October 6, 2021	145	1.01
6	22	November 16, 2021	July 31, 2022	133	0.46
7	20	March 29, 2023	August 23, 2023	129	0.39

== Episodes ==
=== Season 1 (2017) ===
No. overall	No. in season	Title	Directed by	Written by	Original release date	Prod. code	U.S. viewers (millions)
1	1	"Chapter One: The River's Edge"	Lee Toland Krieger	Roberto Aguirre-Sacasa	January 26, 2017	T15.10136	1.38
2	2	"Chapter Two: A Touch of Evil"	Lee Toland Krieger	Roberto Aguirre-Sacasa	February 2, 2017	T13.20302	1.15
3	3	"Chapter Three: Body Double"	Lee Toland Krieger	Yolonda E. Lawrence	February 9, 2017	T13.20303	1.20
4	4	"Chapter Four: The Last Picture Show"	Mark Piznarski	Michael Grassi	February 16, 2017	T13.20304	1.14
5	5	"Chapter Five: Heart of Darkness"	Jesse Warn	Ross Maxwell	February 23, 2017	T13.20305	0.98
6	6	"Chapter Six: Faster, Pussycats! Kill! Kill!"	Steven A. Adelson	Tessa Leigh Williams & Nicholas Zwart	March 2, 2017	T13.20306	1.09
7	7	"Chapter Seven: In a Lonely Place"	Allison Anders	Aaron Allen	March 9, 2017	T13.20307	1.03
8	8	"Chapter Eight: The Outsiders"	David Katzenberg	Julia Cohen	March 30, 2017	T13.20308	0.99
9	9	"Chapter Nine: La Grande Illusion"	Lee Rose	James DeWille	April 6, 2017	T13.20309	0.91
10	10	"Chapter Ten: The Lost Weekend"	Dawn Wilkinson	Britta Lundin & Brian E. Paterson	April 13, 2017	T13.20310	0.87
11	11	"Chapter Eleven: To Riverdale and Back Again"	Kevin Sullivan	Roberto Aguirre-Sacasa	April 27, 2017	T13.20311	0.89
12	12	"Chapter Twelve: Anatomy of a Murder"	Rob Seidenglanz	Michael Grassi	May 4, 2017	T13.20312	0.98
13	13	"Chapter Thirteen: The Sweet Hereafter"	Lee Toland Krieger	Roberto Aguirre-Sacasa	May 11, 2017	T13.20313	0.96

=== Season 2 (2017–18) ===
No. overall	No. in season	Title	Directed by	Written by	Original release date	Prod. code	US viewers (millions)
14	1	"Chapter Fourteen: A Kiss Before Dying"	Rob Seidenglanz	Roberto Aguirre-Sacasa	October 11, 2017	T13.20801	2.34
15	2	"Chapter Fifteen: Nighthawks"	Allison Anders	Michael Grassi	October 18, 2017	T13.20802	1.76
16	3	"Chapter Sixteen: The Watcher in the Woods"	Kevin Sullivan	Ross Maxwell	October 25, 2017	T13.20803	1.62
17	4	"Chapter Seventeen: The Town That Dreaded Sundown"	Jason Stone	Amanda Lasher	November 1, 2017	T13.20804	1.51
18	5	"Chapter Eighteen: When a Stranger Calls"	Ellen Pressman	Aaron Allen	November 8, 2017	T13.20805	1.47
19	6	"Chapter Nineteen: Death Proof"	Maggie Kiley	Tessa Leigh Williams & Arabella Anderson	November 15, 2017	T13.20806	1.43
20	7	"Chapter Twenty: Tales from the Darkside"	Dawn Wilkinson	James DeWille	November 29, 2017	T13.20807	1.45
21	8	"Chapter Twenty-One: House of the Devil"	Kevin Sullivan	Yolonda Lawrence	December 6, 2017	T13.20808	1.48
22	9	"Chapter Twenty-Two: Silent Night, Deadly Night"	Rob Seidenglanz	Shepard Boucher	December 13, 2017	T13.20809	1.43
23	10	"Chapter Twenty-Three: The Blackboard Jungle"	Tim Hunter	Britta Lundin & Brian E. Paterson	January 17, 2018	T13.20810	1.44
24	11	"Chapter Twenty-Four: The Wrestler"	Gregg Araki	Greg Murray & Devon Turner	January 24, 2018	T13.20811	1.39
25	12	"Chapter Twenty-Five: The Wicked and the Divine"	Rachel Talalay	Roberto Aguirre-Sacasa	January 31, 2018	T13.20812	1.34
26	13	"Chapter Twenty-Six: The Tell-Tale Heart"	Julie Plec	Michael Grassi	February 7, 2018	T13.20813	1.28
27	14	"Chapter Twenty-Seven: The Hills Have Eyes"	David Katzenberg	Ross Maxwell	March 7, 2018	T13.20814	1.26
28	15	"Chapter Twenty-Eight: There Will Be Blood"	Mark Piznarski	Aaron Allen	March 14, 2018	T13.20815	1.19
29	16	"Chapter Twenty-Nine: Primary Colors"	Sherwin Shilati	James DeWille	March 21, 2018	T13.20816	1.16
30	17	"Chapter Thirty: The Noose Tightens"	Alexis Ostrander	Britta Lundin & Brian E. Paterson	March 28, 2018	T13.20817	0.96
31	18	"Chapter Thirty-One: A Night to Remember"	Jason Stone	Arabella Anderson & Tessa Leigh Williams	April 18, 2018	T13.20818	1.10
32	19	"Chapter Thirty-Two: Prisoners"	Jennifer Phang	Cristine Chambers	April 25, 2018	T13.20819	1.17
33	20	"Chapter Thirty-Three: Shadow of a Doubt"	Gregory Smith	Yolanda E. Lawrence	May 2, 2018	T13.20820	1.11
34	21	"Chapter Thirty-Four: Judgment Night"	Cherie Nowlan	Shepard Boucher	May 9, 2018	T13.20821	1.00
35	22	"Chapter Thirty-Five: Brave New World"	Steven A. Adelson	Roberto Aguirre-Sacasa	May 16, 2018	T13.20822	1.28

=== Season 3 (2018–19) ===
No. overall	No. in season	Title	Directed by	Written by	Original release date	Prod. code	US viewers (millions)
36	1	"Chapter Thirty-Six: Labor Day"	Kevin Sullivan	Roberto Aguirre-Sacasa	October 10, 2018	T13.21251	1.50
37	2	"Chapter Thirty-Seven: Fortune and Men's Eyes"	Jeff Woolnough	Michael Grassi	October 17, 2018	T13.21252	1.28
38	3	"Chapter Thirty-Eight: As Above, So Below"	Jeff Hunt	Aaron Allen	October 24, 2018	T13.21253	1.40
39	4	"Chapter Thirty-Nine: The Midnight Club"	Dawn Wilkinson	Tessa Leigh Williams	November 7, 2018	T13.21254	1.37
40	5	"Chapter Forty: The Great Escape"	Pam Romanowsky	Greg Murray & Ace Hasan	November 14, 2018	T13.21255	1.25
41	6	"Chapter Forty-One: Manhunter"	Rachel Talalay	Cristine Chambers	November 28, 2018	T13.21256	1.27
42	7	"Chapter Forty-Two: The Man in Black"	Alex Pillai	Janine Salinas Schoenberg	December 5, 2018	T13.21257	1.09
43	8	"Chapter Forty-Three: Outbreak"	John Kretchmer	James DeWille	December 12, 2018	T13.21258	1.20
44	9	"Chapter Forty-Four: No Exit"	Jeff Hunt	Arabella Anderson	January 16, 2019	T13.21259	1.32
45	10	"Chapter Forty-Five: The Stranger"	Maggie Kiley	Brian E. Paterson	January 23, 2019	T13.21260	1.12
46	11	"Chapter Forty-Six: The Red Dahlia"	Greg Smith	Devon Turner & Will Ewing	January 30, 2019	T13.21261	1.26
47	12	"Chapter Forty-Seven: Bizarrodale"	Harry Jierjian	Britta Lundin	February 6, 2019	T13.21262	0.96
48	13	"Chapter Forty-Eight: Requiem for a Welterweight"	Tawnia McKiernan	Michael Grassi	February 27, 2019	T13.21263	0.86
49	14	"Chapter Forty-Nine: Fire Walk with Me"	Marisol Adler	Aaron Allen	March 6, 2019	T13.21264	0.92
50	15	"Chapter Fifty: American Dreams"	Gabriel Correa	Roberto Aguirre-Sacasa	March 13, 2019	T13.21265	0.95
51	16	"Chapter Fifty-One: Big Fun"	Maggie Kiley	Tessa Leigh Williams	March 20, 2019	T13.21266	0.81
52	17	"Chapter Fifty-Two: The Raid"	Pamela Romanowsky	Greg Murray & Ace Hasan	March 27, 2019	T13.21267	0.81
53	18	"Chapter Fifty-Three: Jawbreaker"	Gabriel Correa	Brian E. Paterson & Arabella Anderson	April 17, 2019	T13.21268	0.80
54	19	"Chapter Fifty-Four: Fear the Reaper"	Alexandra La Roche	Janine Salinas Schoenberg & Will Ewing	April 24, 2019	T13.21269	0.71
55	20	"Chapter Fifty-Five: Prom Night"	David Katzenberg	Britta Lundin & Devon Turner	May 1, 2019	T13.21270	0.70
56	21	"Chapter Fifty-Six: The Dark Secret of Harvest House"	Rob Seidenglanz	Cristine Chambers & James DeWille	May 8, 2019	T13.21271	0.74
57	22	"Chapter Fifty-Seven: Survive the Night"	Rachel Talalay	Roberto Aguirre-Sacasa & Michael Grassi	May 15, 2019	T13.21272	0.86

=== Season 4 (2019–20) ===
No. overall	No. in season	Title	Directed by	Written by	Original release date	Prod. code	U.S. viewers (millions)
58	1	"Chapter Fifty-Eight: In Memoriam"	Gabriel Correa	Roberto Aguirre-Sacasa	October 9, 2019	T13.21851	1.14
59	2	"Chapter Fifty-Nine: Fast Times at Riverdale High"	Pamela Romanowsky	Michael Grassi & Will Ewing	October 16, 2019	T13.21852	0.80
60	3	"Chapter Sixty: Dog Day Afternoon"	Gregory Smith	Ace Hasan & Greg Murray	October 23, 2019	T13.21853	0.87
61	4	"Chapter Sixty-One: Halloween"	Erin Feeley	Janine Salinas Schoenberg	October 30, 2019	T13.21854	0.74
62	5	"Chapter Sixty-Two: Witness for the Prosecution"	Harry Jierjian	Devon Turner	November 6, 2019	T13.21855	0.76
63	6	"Chapter Sixty-Three: Hereditary"	Gabriel Correa	James DeWille	November 13, 2019	T13.21856	0.82
64	7	"Chapter Sixty-Four: The Ice Storm"	Alex Pillai	Arabella Anderson	November 20, 2019	T13.21857	0.74
65	8	"Chapter Sixty-Five: In Treatment"	Michael Goi	Tessa Leigh Williams	December 4, 2019	T13.21858	0.69
66	9	"Chapter Sixty-Six: Tangerine"	Gabriel Correa	Brian E. Paterson	December 11, 2019	T13.21859	0.73
67	10	"Chapter Sixty-Seven: Varsity Blues"	Roxanne Benjamin	Aaron Allen	January 22, 2020	T13.21860	0.79
68	11	"Chapter Sixty-Eight: Quiz Show"	Chell Stephen	Ted Sullivan	January 29, 2020	T13.21861	0.73
69	12	"Chapter Sixty-Nine: Men of Honor"	Catriona McKenzie	Ariana Jackson	February 5, 2020	T13.21862	0.65
70	13	"Chapter Seventy: The Ides of March"	Claudia Yarmy	Chrissy Maroon & Evan Kyle	February 12, 2020	T13.21863	0.65
71	14	"Chapter Seventy-One: How to Get Away with Murder"	James DeWille	Arabella Anderson	February 26, 2020	T13.21864	0.67
72	15	"Chapter Seventy-Two: To Die For"	Shannon Kohli	Roberto Aguirre-Sacasa	March 4, 2020	T13.21865	0.66
73	16	"Chapter Seventy-Three: The Locked Room"	Tessa Blake	Aaron Allen	March 11, 2020	T13.21866	0.66
74	17	"Chapter Seventy-Four: Wicked Little Town"	Antonio Negret	Tessa Leigh Williams	April 15, 2020	T13.21867	0.54
75	18	"Chapter Seventy-Five: Lynchian"	Steven A. Adelson	Ariana Jackson & Brian E. Paterson	April 29, 2020	T13.21868	0.66
76	19	"Chapter Seventy-Six: Killing Mr. Honey"	Mädchen Amick	Ted Sullivan & James DeWille	May 6, 2020	T13.21869	0.65

=== Season 5 (2021) ===
No. overall	No. in season	Title	Directed by	Written by	Original release date	Prod. code	U.S. viewers (millions)
77	1	"Chapter Seventy-Seven: Climax"	Pamela Romanowsky	Ace Hasan & Greg Murray	January 20, 2021	T13.22701	0.63
78	2	"Chapter Seventy-Eight: The Preppy Murders"	Gabriel Correa	Janine Salinas Schoenberg & Devon Turner	January 27, 2021	T13.22702	0.52
79	3	"Chapter Seventy-Nine: Graduation"	Gabriel Correa	Roberto Aguirre-Sacasa	February 3, 2021	T13.22703	0.54
80	4	"Chapter Eighty: Purgatorio"	Steven A. Adelson	Roberto Aguirre-Sacasa	February 10, 2021	T13.22704	0.48
81	5	"Chapter Eighty-One: The Homecoming"	Steven A. Adelson	Michael Grassi	February 17, 2021	T13.22705	0.59
82	6	"Chapter Eighty-Two: Back to School"	Gabriel Correa	Ariana Jackson	February 24, 2021	T13.22706	0.60
83	7	"Chapter Eighty-Three: Fire in the Sky"	Gabriel Correa	Ted Sullivan	March 10, 2021	T13.22707	0.52
84	8	"Chapter Eighty-Four: Lock & Key"	Rachel Talalay	Arabella Anderson	March 17, 2021	T13.22708	0.45
85	9	"Chapter Eighty-Five: Destroyer"	Rob Seidenglanz	Ace Hasan	March 24, 2021	T13.22709	0.46
86	10	"Chapter Eighty-Six: The Pincushion Man"	Gabriel Correa	Chrissy Maroon	March 31, 2021	T13.22710	0.49
87	11	"Chapter Eighty-Seven: Strange Bedfellows"	Tessa Blake	Aaron Allen	August 11, 2021	T13.22711	0.38
88	12	"Chapter Eighty-Eight: Citizen Lodge"	James DeWille	Brian E. Paterson	August 18, 2021	T13.22712	0.47
89	13	"Chapter Eighty-Nine: Reservoir Dogs"	Gabriel Correa	Evan Kyle	August 25, 2021	T13.22713	0.47
90	14	"Chapter Ninety: The Night Gallery"	Mädchen Amick	James DeWille	September 1, 2021	T13.22714	0.36
91	15	"Chapter Ninety-One: The Return of the Pussycats"	Robin Givens	Ariana Jackson & Evan Kyle	September 8, 2021	T13.22715	0.39
92	16	"Chapter Ninety-Two: Band of Brothers"	Robin Givens	Janine Salinas Schoenberg	September 15, 2021	T13.22716	0.45
93	17	"Chapter Ninety-Three: Dance of Death"	Nathalie Boltt	Devon Turner	September 22, 2021	T13.22717	0.35
94	18	"Chapter Ninety-Four: Next to Normal"	Ronald Paul Richard	Tessa Leigh Williams	September 29, 2021	T13.22718	0.25
95	19	"Chapter Ninety-Five: Riverdale: RIP (?)"	Gabriel Correa	Roberto Aguirre-Sacasa & Greg Murray	October 6, 2021	T13.22719	0.36

=== Season 6 (2021–22) ===
No. overall	No. in season	Title	Directed by	Written by	Original release date	Prod. code	U.S. viewers (millions)
Special Event: Rivervale
96	1	"Chapter Ninety-Six: Welcome to Rivervale"	Gabriel Correa	Roberto Aguirre-Sacasa	November 16, 2021	T13.23301	0.33
Following the events of the explosion at the Andrews house, Archie and Betty awaken in the town of Rivervale. Archie and the gang attempt to stop Cheryl’s vendetta against the town of Rivervale after her secession. Betty and Archie talk about starting a family together. Cheryl hosts a Maple Fest at Thornhill, where Archie is crowned king and is given a pie as his prize. Later that evening, Archie and Betty eat the pie and have sex on the kitchen table. Archie is woken in the middle of the night and called to the maple grove, where the entire town is waiting to sacrifice him. Cheryl affixes him to a post and carves out his heart, as the town rejoices.
97	2	"Chapter Ninety-Seven: Ghost Stories"	Gabriel Correa	Janine Salinas Schoenberg	November 23, 2021	T13.23302	0.34
Betty hunts La Llorona as she makes her way through Rivervale, haunting all of its residents. La Llorona nearly drowns Juniper in the bathtub at Thornhill and kidnaps Anthony from Toni’s apartment. Toni reveals to Betty that La Llorona likely materialized because she killed Darla Dickinson’s son in a gang fight. Darla called La Llorona to Rivervale to kill Anthony. Betty and Toni find the entity about to drown Anthony when Toni gives her soul to the ghost to save Anthony’s life.
98	3	"Chapter Ninety-Eight: Mr. Cypher"	Jeff Woolnough	Greg Murray	November 30, 2021	T13.23303	0.26
The devil comes to Rivervale, posing under the alias of Louis Cypher. He threatens several of the town’s residents with their darkest secrets and sins and exchanges favors with them in turn for their souls. Jughead sells his soul to the devil, leading there to be a disgrace on his name. Veronica nearly sells her soul to the devil to avoid misfortune at the Babylonium, but sells Reggie’s soul instead when she realizes he undermined her.
99	4	"Chapter Ninety-Nine: The Witching Hour(s)"	James DeWille	Arabella Anderson	December 7, 2021	T13.23304	0.27
As Bailey’s Comet travels over Rivervale, Nana Rose falls deathly ill. Cheryl calls in Sabrina Spellman from Greendale to help perform a transference of Nana Rose’s soul to Cheryl’s body. Realizing that she is inhabited with the soul of Abigail Blossom, Cheryl recounts the stories of Blossom women past who shared Abigail’s soul through the years, including Poppy Blossom in the 1950’s and Abigail Blossom herself in the late 1800’s. Cheryl realizes both women were victims of severe persecution, and she resonates with their pain. Cheryl and Sabrina perform a successful transference of Nana Rose’s soul to Cheryl’s body just as Bailey’s Comet passes over town. Note: This episode is a crossover with Chilling Adventures of Sabrina.
100	5	"Chapter One Hundred: The Jughead Paradox"	Gabriel Correa	Roberto Aguirre-Sacasa	December 14, 2021	T13.23305	0.29
Jughead becomes unnerved after discovering a dead body resembling him on the town's outskirts, and notices cracks in Rivervale's surface. Two versions of Reggie arrive, and he encounters living Jason Blossom and Ben Button. Uncovering ninety-five comics detailing Riverdale stories, he realizes they shift to Rivervale after Archie's house explosion. Recognizing a connection between the two universes, Jughead enlists Ethel Muggs and an alive Dilton Doiley to close the gap. Recreating events prior to the bomb, they successfully seal one Jughead in the bunker with Ethel, ensuring uninterrupted storytelling from the Rivervale universe. Jughead makes a call to Riverdale's Betty, warning and saving her and Archie from the explosion.
Regular season
101	6	"Chapter One Hundred and One: Unbelievable"	James DeWille	James DeWille	March 20, 2022	T13.23306	0.23
Archie and Betty experience mysterious side effects from the explosion, with Betty sensing malice from a hospital orderly. Fangs and Toni's ceasefire attempt with the Ghoulies fails, leading to Archie confronting them alone. Veronica plots Hiram's demise but is too late to call off the hit. Jughead suffers hearing loss and seeks medical help. Cheryl attempts to reverse a curse but inadvertently becomes possessed. Percival Pickens offers to buy the Andrews house, but Archie refuses.
102	7	"Chapter One Hundred and Two: Death at a Funeral"	Tara Dafoe	Ted Sullivan	March 27, 2022	T13.23307	0.21
Jughead grapples with hearing loss and writer's block but finds solace in creating a graphic novel. He discovers an ability to hear people's thoughts. Betty, after Glen goes missing, receives his dismembered body parts and is attacked by TBK. Deciding to leave town to protect others, she knows TBK will follow. Archie rebuilds his house but realizes palladium removes his invulnerability. Attacked by TBK, he's saved by Bingo's newfound healing ability. Veronica's family visits for Hiram's memorial, and after dealing with the consequences of her hit on him, Hermione and Reggie help her come to terms with his death. Veronica survives an assassination attempt, thanks to Heraldo. Abigail, revived to restore the Blossoms' glory, becomes obsessed with Toni and plans to reclaim her and destroy the offspring of those who wronged her.
103	8	"Chapter One Hundred and Three: The Town"	Rob Seidenglanz	Brian E. Paterson	April 3, 2022	T13.23308	0.18
Britta enters Abigail's mind to find Cheryl tormented by a specter of Penelope. She alerts Cheryl, allowing her to fight back against her mental trap. Percival denounces Riverdale and suggests bussing out the homeless. Archie's attempt to provide micro-houses is vandalized, leading to conflicts. Jughead discovers Percival has persuaded the homeless to leave. Veronica and Reggie face challenges opening a casino, including a suicide linked to Percival. Heraldo removes the body and footage shows Percival interacting with the man. Jughead tries to read Percival's mind but discovers Percival is aware of his telepathy. Heraldo reveals no record of Percival before Riverdale. Betty returns to town and learns about Percival from Archie.
104	9	"Chapter One Hundred and Four: The Serpent Queen's Gambit"	Antonio Negret	Danielle Iman	April 10, 2022	T13.23309	0.22
Abigail attempts to poison Archie, Betty, and Jughead, but Betty intervenes. After another attempt on Archie's life, Jughead reads Britta's mind, uncovering Abigail's plans. Together with Britta and Rose, they banish Abigail's spirit into the Julian doll, restoring Cheryl's body. A war between the Serpents and Ghoulies ensues, leading to Toni's removal from the town council. Fangs is arrested for possessing guns, and the Ghoulies kidnap Anthony. Toni agrees to a gang fight, but police intervention halts it. Later, Percival informs Toni that the Ghoulies were found dead, apparently by suicide. Kevin sues Toni and Fangs for custody of Anthony. Reggie adapts to his father's financial troubles by merging casino business with the dealership. Following Toni's dismissal, Percival is elected to the council by Alice and Frank.
105	10	"Chapter One Hundred and Five: Folk Heroes"	Gabriel Correa	Devon Turner	April 17, 2022	T13.23310	0.23
Archie attempts to revitalize Riverdale by setting a Guinness World Record, showcasing his invulnerability. He invites KO Kelly for a boxing match, but Percival, unable to harm Archie, injures KO and fights Archie himself, utilizing palladium in his glove. Percival steps down as a deputy, opens a curiosity shop, and reveals various town secrets to Veronica. Veronica breaks up with Reggie but resolves issues with Tabitha and Toni. Betty, aided by the FBI, discovers Cheryl has developed pyrokinesis, leading to spontaneous combustions. Cheryl learns to control her abilities with Betty's help.
106	11	"Chapter One Hundred and Six: Angels in America"	Claudia Yarmy	Evan Kyle	April 24, 2022	T13.23311	0.21
Tabitha discovers Percival's plan to build a railroad through Riverdale and construct a station on Pop's. When seeking help from others, they refuse. Jughead suggests turning Pop's into a landmark, revealing his and others' powers. Tabitha, attacked by an armed robber at Pop's, is shot and awakens in 1944. She learns about her ability to time travel and prevents Riverdale from becoming a sundown town, facing opposition from Percival. Sent to 1968, she protects the black community during MLK's assassination. In 1999, with Raphael (now Betty), she traces vandalism to a shop owned by Percival, defeating him and returning to the present. Tabitha shares her powers and visions, urging the group to save Pop's and prevent a future disaster in Riverdale.
107	12	"Chapter One Hundred and Seven: In the Fog"	Jeff Woolnough	Chrissy Maroon	May 1, 2022	T13.23312	0.16
A fog envelops Riverdale, trapping everyone in their current locations. Archie and Betty confront a potential pregnancy, reaffirming their commitment. Cheryl receives letters from Penelope, who reveals her decision to become a nun. Veronica and Reggie rekindle their relationship but recognize unhealthy patterns, leading to a permanent breakup. Kevin reconnects with Moose during dinner with Toni and Fangs, reigniting their romance. Kevin offers joint custody for Anthony, but Fangs plans to fight. Tabitha confesses her time-traveling mission to Jughead, who accepts a future where Percival wins and prepares to face it. After the fog lifts, Alice announces Percival as Riverdale's new mayor, dissolving the council.
108	13	"Chapter One Hundred and Eight: Ex-Libris"	Ruba Nadda	Aaron Allen	May 8, 2022	T13.23313	0.19
Reggie moves out and Betty's pregnancy test turns out negative. Percival pursues overdue library books from the gang, taking their belongings as collateral. He uses the items to torment them with traumatic memories. Betty recalls Hal's crimes, Archie confronts his affair with Miss Grundy, Jughead faces his grandfather's death, Veronica grapples with loneliness, and Cheryl encounters the ghost of Heather. Reggie and Kevin evade Percival's book hunt. Percival gains an ally in Reggie, leading to a surprising kiss with Kevin. Veronica discovers Heraldo's death from a black widow spider bite. Dr. Curdle confirms the cause. The gang returns books, regaining their items. Cheryl hosts a gathering to burn their possessions, breaking Percival's hold.
109	14	"Chapter One Hundred and Nine: Venomous"	Lisa Soper	Tessa Leigh Williams	May 15, 2022	T13.23314	0.20
Archie seeks Cheryl's help to overcome his palladium weakness, and a successful ritual transforms his body. Betty turns to Jughead to uncover repressed memories, revealing that Alice tested positive for the serial killer gene. Hal and Alice covered up a murder together, upsetting Betty. Veronica clashes with Reggie for control of the Babylonium, managing the intense toxins her body produces. Cheryl reaches out to Heather against Nana Rose's advice, and Jughead reminisces about his time with Betty as Heather surprises Cheryl at Thornhill.
110	15	"Chapter One Hundred and Ten: Things That Go Bump in the Night"	Gabriel Correa	Gigi Swift & Ryan Terrebonne	May 22, 2022	T13.23315	0.21
Heather mentors Cheryl in the arcane arts, revealing her witch identity. Betty, alarmed by threatening auras, consults Agent Drake. They attribute her visions to individuals without the MAOA gene, but Betty sees an aura around her reflection, complicating matters. Veronica seeks Jughead's help to boost Babylonium's business, dealing with Reggie's blackmail by instructing Jughead to erase his memory. Toni and Fangs battle for Anthony's custody, with Fangs facing job struggles. Archie and Tabitha dismantle Pop's against Percival's demolition, but the diner reassembles overnight. Tabitha learns it's inhabited by ghosts and compromises to move the diner rapidly.
111	16	"Chapter One Hundred and Eleven: Blue Collar"	Tara Dafoe	James DeWille & Arabella Anderson	May 29, 2022	T13.23316	0.17
Archie and Tabitha rally Percival's work crew to unionize, investigating the Pickens' history for evidence of mistreatment with Cheryl's help. Heather aids Cheryl in a spell to enter Percival's shop unnoticed for a book retrieval. Meanwhile, Reggie and Percival manipulate Jughead's mind in retaliation, and Toni and Fangs continue their custody battle against Kevin. Toni recruits Britta to babysit Anthony, leading Kevin to seek a pacifier test for paternity. However, Toni confronts him, sparking a heated argument. Betty discovers Charles, dying of leukemia, in her bed. She enlists Veronica and Agent Drake to remove toxins from Charles's body through a blood transfusion, seemingly succeeding. Determined to trap TBK, Betty seeks permission from Veronica to host a serial killer convention at the Babylonium.
112	17	"Chapter One Hundred and Twelve: American Psychos"	Gabriel Correa	Tessa Leigh Williams & Greg Murray	June 12, 2022	T13.23317	0.24
Betty and Veronica finalize plans for the convention, while Toni informs Cheryl about the wedding, leading Cheryl to cast a misfortune spell with Kevin's help. When the spell backfires, Heather intervenes to assist with Anthony's colic. Archie and Tabitha continue opposing Percival, convincing the work crew to quit, with Archie singing "Bread and Roses" at the construction site. Agent Drake confesses her feelings to Betty during the convention, leading to a confrontation with Veronica. Betty receives a call from TBK at the convention, making her believe he's present. Later, she encounters TBK at her house, discovering an FBI agent murdered and her family tied up. After confronting TBK in the garage, Betty kills him. Returning home, she has a crucial conversation with Archie to solidify the direction of their relationship.
113	18	"Chapter One Hundred and Thirteen: Biblical"	Ronald Paul Richard	Janine Salinas Schoenberg & Brian E. Paterson	June 26, 2022	T13.23318	0.29
Jughead struggles in the bunker as Archie and Tabitha work to maintain hope within the union. Percival brings plagues to the town, turning the Sweetwater River red. Veronica faces challenges in planning Toni and Fangs' wedding, and Cheryl's attempt to set Percival on fire fails, resulting in tragedy. Betty discovers Percival's plan to capture her, and a confrontation ensues. Betty, aided by the gang using Heather's invisibility spell, manages to incapacitate Percival before Toni's wedding. However, Percival escapes and causes the death of all first-born children in Riverdale, including Archie, Jughead, Fangs, and Toni. Jughead encounters his Rivervale counterpart, and Heather decides to seek assistance from Sabrina Spellman.
114	19	"Chapter One Hundred and Fourteen: The Witches of Riverdale"	Alex Sanjiv Pillai	Roberto Aguirre-Sacasa & Chrissy Maroon	July 10, 2022	T13.23319	0.22
Heather calls Sabrina Spellman to resurrect their deceased friends. Kevin attempts to leave town, but is captured by Percival. Sabrina inducts Betty, Veronica, and Tabitha into the coven, using Jughead's body to bring back Nick Scratch. To rescue their friends from the afterlife, Cheryl, Veronica, and Tabitha are sent through Charon, encountering various challenges. Sabrina and Nick share a final date before he returns to the afterlife. Percival captures Kevin, offering his heart to save Marty. Reggie and Kevin are captured after a failed rescue attempt. Cheryl, with her phoenix powers, forcibly resurrects their friends, including Jason and Polly. Percival plans to kill them, but Reggie reveals a hidden plan. Tabitha unveils Anthony's immortality and her role as Riverdale's guardian angel. Note: This episode is a crossover with Chilling Adventures of Sabrina and provides closure to plot points from that series.
115	20	"Chapter One Hundred and Fifteen: Return to Rivervale"	Anna Kerrigan	Ted Sullivan & Devon Turner	July 17, 2022	T13.23320	0.26
Jughead discovers his ability to open portals and travels with Tabitha to the Rivervale universe for answers about Percival. Meanwhile, Tom and Frank hold Kevin, Marty, and Reggie hostage at the Babylonium to prevent their execution. Alice interviews Percival, learning that he's an immortal being brought into Riverdale during the bomb incident. He seeks revenge against the ancestors of the gang, the early settlers. Betty reunites with Polly, realizing her evil doesn't define her. Cheryl and Archie plan to sabotage train tracks after freeing the hostages. Jughead and Tabitha gather intel from Mr. Cypher in Rivervale, realizing the challenge against Percival in Riverdale is formidable. Jughead opens a portal to help the escape of Kevin, Reggie, and Marty. In retaliation, Percival announces the execution of Frank, Tom, and Alice to the gang.
116	21	"Chapter One Hundred and Sixteen: The Stand"	Cierra Glaudé	Danielle Iman & Evan Kyle	July 24, 2022	T13.23321	0.23
The group attempts to negotiate with Percival, but he refuses and presents the corpses of Alice, Frank, and Tom without heads. Cheryl can't resurrect them. Percival uses a spell to make Reggie, Jason, Veronica's grandmother, and Glen's corpse attack the gang. Cheryl kills Jason again. Tabitha ages Anthony into a young adult and attacks Percival, who escapes. Pop's is disassembled and reassembled, confronting Percival. Archie, Betty, Veronica, Cheryl, and Reggie are subdued, and Jughead enters Percival's mind, tricking him to abandon his body. Percival returns to Rivervale Pop's, where counterparts stab him. Tabitha brings him back before immortality, and as he dies, he casts a final spell. In Riverdale, Cheryl resurrects Alice, Frank, and Tom, discovering Percival redirected Bailey's Comet to destroy Riverdale, confirming Tabitha's vision.
117	22	"Chapter One Hundred and Seventeen: Night of the Comet"	Gabriel Correa	Roberto Aguirre-Sacasa & Aaron Allen	July 31, 2022	T13.23322	0.17
As the comet approaches, Cheryl, Heather, and Toni make a deal with Abigail to destroy the comet and break the barrier. Cheryl, with her powers, can melt the comet, but it might result in the death of some resurrected individuals. Mary helps Archie confront his hero complex. Betty declines a promotion, focusing on positivity. Veronica learns independence and gives the casino to Reggie. Jughead and Tabitha share their lives using her powers. Heather reveals Cheryl and Toni's soulmate connection. Veronica filters powers, transferring all to Cheryl, who melts the comet. The gang wakes up in 1955, back in high school, with only Jughead remembering their past lives.

=== Season 7 (2023) ===
No. overall	No. in season	Title	Directed by	Written by	Original release date	Prod. code	U.S. viewers (millions)
118	1	"Chapter One Hundred and Eighteen: Don't Worry, Darling"	Ronald Paul Richard	Roberto Aguirre-Sacasa & Danielle Iman	March 29, 2023	T13.23901	0.26
In the aftermath of Bailey's Comet in 1955, Riverdale takes on a new dynamic: Betty and Kevin are dating, Cheryl's twin brother (now named Julian) is alive, Jughead lives alone with a pet dog, Fred died in the Korean War, and Archie–forbidden from driving by Mary after James Dean's death–competes for Veronica Lodge's attention. After Emmett Till's murder, Jughead tries to connect with Tabitha, who later leaves to tour with Till's family. Jughead unearths a time capsule from high school, but the others dismiss his claims. Veronica's exile to Riverdale is revealed, tied to her involvement in James Dean's accident. Betty and Toni draw attention to Till's injustice, and Jughead encounters Tabitha from the original timeline. She discloses that the comet hit Riverdale, prompting her to protect them by sending them to the past and erasing Jughead's memory to preserve the timeline.
119	2	"Chapter One Hundred and Nineteen: Skip, Hop, and Thump!"	Ronald Paul Richard	Ariana Jackson	April 5, 2023	T13.23902	0.27
Archie writes a poem to ask Veronica to the sock hop but gives up when he sees her considering others. Betty gets upset with Kevin's hesitation and develops feelings for Archie. Kevin is drawn to the new student, Clay Walker. Encouraged by Alice, Kevin commits to Betty, giving her Alice's pin. Toni convinces Cheryl to choose Fangs for the sock hop performance. Jughead confronts Pep Comics for stealing his story and gets hired by editor Al Fieldstone, who later brings in Ethel as an artist. Despite disapproval from Ethel's parents, she and Jughead agree to attend the sock hop together. At the event, Veronica apologizes to Archie, but he rejects her. Toni dances with Cheryl, upsetting Principal Featherhead. Ethel arrives, covered in blood, with news of a terrible incident.
120	3	"Chapter One Hundred and Twenty: Sex Education"	James DeWille	Janine Salinas Schoenberg	April 12, 2023	T13.23903	0.22
Ethel claims a milkman killed her parents, though the authorities don't believe her. Afterward, she moves in with the Coopers, to Hal's displeasure, and tells Jughead some of the pictures she drew are of her parents' deaths. He retrieves them from her house, but is nearly caught by Betty, who takes clothes and a book on sex education. Penelope pressures Cheryl to date a boy, and she starts a relationship with Archie. The students attend an open mic at the coffee shop, where Cheryl is aroused by Toni, and fantasize about each other. After a lecture on sex education, Veronica, who still has feelings for Archie, invites the students to a makeout party, though Clay declines and confesses to Kevin that he is gay. At the makeout party, Cheryl goes further with Archie, Veronica and Jughead begin a relationship, and Betty finds Kevin is not aroused by her while Archie was, and gives her boyfriend the book to get him interested. The next day, Ethel and Jughead are confronted in the principal's office by Sheriff Keller, who shows them he searched Jughead's home and found Ethel's drawings and a comic about a homicidal milkman, seemingly believing they are guilty.
121	4	"Chapter One Hundred and Twenty-One: Love & Marriage"	Claudia Yarmy	Chrissy Maroon	April 19, 2023	T13.23904	0.25
Jughead and Ethel are arrested for the murders. Veronica gets Jughead released, and he reveals Julian was with Ethel during the murders. They force him to tell the police and Ethel is released. She also helps him refurbish his home, and they share a kiss. Betty breaks up with Kevin when he returns the book and admits he wants to wait until marriage. When she sees him with Clay, she realizes he is gay and tells Alice, who tries to convince her it is just a phase. She confronts Kevin, and they repair their friendship. He later tells her Alice gave him the pin, and she confronts her mother, who reveals she has burned the sex book and sent Ethel to the Sisters of Quiet Mercy. Archie and Cheryl, claiming to have had sex, are pressured to get married by their parents. However, Cheryl eventually decides to stop denying her sexuality, and breaks up with Archie, encouraging him to pursue Betty. Mary calls Archie's uncle Frank to come and get him back on track. Fangs and Midge get pregnant, but her parents refuse to let them marry, so Fangs decides to become a rock star to be acceptable to them.
122	5	"Chapter One Hundred Twenty-Two: Tales in a Jugular Vein"	Jeff Woolnough	Greg Murray	April 26, 2023	T13.23905	0.19
Mr. Fieldstone assigns Jughead to write four stories despite censorship concerns. Jughead shares the stories with Veronica. In the first, Dilton, bullied by the basketball team, retaliates by killing them and using their heads as basketballs. In the second, Archie stays overnight at Thornhill, engaging with Cheryl who has leprosy. The third story features Betty's popularity taking a deadly turn when black widow spiders nest in her new hairstyle. The final story depicts Archie's demise after dating both Betty and Veronica. Veronica breaks up with Jughead due to the stories' negative portrayal of women, though Mr. Fieldstone approves and offers to credit Jughead.
123	6	"Chapter One Hundred Twenty-Three: Peep Show"	Amy Myrold	Ted Sullivan	May 3, 2023	T13.23906	0.21
Jughead uncovers plagiarism in Pep Comics, leading to a deal between the author Brad Rayberry and Mr. Fieldstone. However, Jughead jeopardizes the relationship by stealing and reading Rayberry's unpublished manuscript. Frank encourages Archie to improve his life, getting a job and joining the basketball team coached by Frank. After facing self-doubt, Archie overcomes it with Mary's support and joins the team. Toni joins the River Vixens, sparking a romantic relationship with Cheryl despite Evelyn's disapproval. Veronica attempts to help Betty attract Archie, leading to a compromising situation witnessed by Hal and Frank. Meanwhile, Dr. Werthers discovers Jughead's involvement in writing horror comics.
124	7	"Chapter One Hundred Twenty-Four: Dirty Dancing"	Jesse Warn	Aaron Allen	May 10, 2023	T13.23907	0.20
After Archie and Betty are caught, Alice spreads the news to the town, and Veronica's parents. She also forces Betty to become a dancer on the Coopers' show, where she is harassed by her coworkers. When Betty gets herself kicked off by flashing her underwear at the camera, Alice refers her to Dr. Werthers. Veronica is forced to get a job working at the Babylonium, which Clay also works at, and finds out her parents plan to buy and raze it. She prevents this by buying it herself. Tom forces Kevin to join the basketball team, and Julian pressures him to see a prostitute. When Archie tells Betty about this, she tells him to stop it. He does, and finds out Kevin is gay, but continues to be friends with him, while Tom reveals to Kevin he set it up to confirm Kevin's sexuality, and takes him off the basketball team. Jughead is forced to either stop writing comics or be expelled, and he drops out of school to continue writing. When Rayberry finds out, he forces Principal Featherhead and Dr. Werthers to compromise by letting Jughead write non-horror comics. Rayberry is later visited by a milkman late at night.
125	8	"Chapter One Hundred Twenty-Five: Hoop Dreams"	Cierra "Shooter" Glaudé	Evan Kyle	May 17, 2023	T13.23908	0.23
The basketball team faces a losing streak, prompting Mr. Blossom to allow Frank to recruit Reggie Mantle, an out-of-town player. Reggie, who is half-Korean, reveals past discrimination and indifference to Archie's attempts at bonding. Archie addresses the team's discriminatory behavior to ensure Reggie's support. Meanwhile, Kevin starts working at the Babylonium, and Veronica seeks his help in gaining Clay's romantic attention, only to find out Clay is gay. Betty reluctantly joins the River Vixens to fulfill her parents' wishes, while Toni quits the squad after a breakup with Cheryl. However, they reconcile, and Cheryl helps Toni secure funds for a black literature club. Tabitha returns to town and strengthens her bond with Jughead, who discovers Brad Rayberry's apparent suicide after attempting to share information about Tabitha with him.
126	9	"Chapter One Hundred Twenty-Six: Betty & Veronica Double Digest"	Alex Sanjiv Pillai	Will Ewing	May 24, 2023	T13.23909	0.19
Jughead mourns Brad Rayberry's death while Betty undergoes therapy with Dr. Werthers. A rift develops when Dr. Werthers and Alice try to shape Betty's perspectives on marriage and sexuality. Feeling betrayed, Betty breaks into Dr. Werthers' office, discovering a copy of Lolita and accusing him of inappropriate fantasies. Their conflict leads to strained relations with Alice and Hal. Veronica faces interference from her parents in promoting the Babylonium, adapting by showing unique films. When her parents retaliate by evicting her, Veronica moves into her Babylonium office. Jughead, having processed Rayberry's death, aids Sheriff Keller in the investigation.
127	10	"Chapter One Hundred Twenty-Seven: American Graffiti"	Kevin Rodney Sullivan	Nate Burke & Sam Rubinek	May 31, 2023	T13.23910	0.28
Cheryl feels excluded as Toni dedicates time to the black literature club. Attempting to join a meeting, Cheryl realizes the importance of giving Toni space. Reggie borrows Archie's car for a date with Veronica, leading to tension when he returns home late without a clear explanation. A double date to Fangs' concert in Centerville reveals trust issues between Archie and Reggie, forcing them to confront their feelings. Betty and Veronica attend the concert with Cheryl, Toni, and Midge. Reggie seeks Betty's help to repair a jalopy, leading to reconciliation with Archie. Jughead and Tabitha investigate Brad Rayberry's death, uncovering his interracial marriage and experiences with racism. Tabitha decides to tour with Emmett Till's family, while Jughead discovers Rayberry encountered a mysterious milkman on the night of his death.
128	11	"Chapter One Hundred Twenty-Eight: Halloween II"	Ronald Paul Richard	Felicia Ho	June 7, 2023	T13.23911	0.23
Despite the ban on Halloween celebrations, the gang decides to defy it. Archie, Betty, and Dilton attempt to give Reggie his first Halloween experience, leading to a competition for Betty's attention. Veronica organizes a show at the Babylonium where Cheryl and Toni publicly reveal their relationship. Ethel escapes from the Sisters of Quiet Mercy and contacts Jughead, leading to an investigation into the mysterious milkman. They discover the original writer of the Milkman comic, who took his own life, citing the comic as the reason. Betty's favoritism towards Archie leads Reggie to join Bulldogs in vandalizing the town. However, their actions result in them driving into Sweetwater River.
129	12	"Chapter One Twenty-Nine: After the Fall"	Julia Bettencourt	Gigi Swift	June 21, 2023	T13.23912	0.19
Reggie's actions lead to a car accident, leaving Julian in a coma and Mr. Blossom blaming Reggie. Despite this, Cheryl and the team move forward with Archie as the new captain. Reggie, displaying a talent for writing poetry, helps devise a plan to overcome threats from Stonewall Prep. Cheryl overhears her father's plot to replace Reggie and, with Archie's support, confronts Mr. Blossom to secure Reggie's captaincy. The team succeeds in defeating Stonewall. Meanwhile, Betty and Veronica bond over their parents' behavior and decide to live together at the Pembrooke. After being caught by Mary, they explain their situation, leading Veronica's parents to allow her back, and Alice to soften her attitude. Ethel and Jughead collaborate on a new comic, "The Mailman Cometh," persuading Mr. Fieldstone to publish it.
130	13	"Chapter One Thirty: The Crucible"	Mädchen Amick	Janine Salinas Schoenberg & Will Ewing	June 28, 2023	T13.23913	0.19
Mrs. Thornton is fired under suspicion of being a communist, replaced by Mrs. Grundy who mentors Archie despite Frank's disapproval of poetry. Cheryl faces pressure from Evelyn to confirm students' sexualities, leading her to pretend to date Kevin, while Clay and Toni also fake a relationship. Hiram visits Riverdale, seeking Veronica's alibi amid a communist investigation. Veronica agrees but forces Hiram to confess his affair to Hermione. Hermione reveals her intention to divorce Hiram. Betty starts a newsletter for teenage girls after the school newspaper is shut down. Jughead and Ethel attempt to sell comics discreetly but are caught; Principal Featherhead buys and burns the comics.
131	14	"Chapter One Hundred Thirty-One: Archie the Musical"	Ronald Paul Richard	Tessa Leigh Williams	July 5, 2023	T13.23914	0.21
Kevin writes a musical for the spring performance, centered around senior year at Riverdale High. Despite resistance from Reggie and Jughead, he casts Archie, who later drops out after realizing he doesn't know what he wants in life. Archie leaves the basketball team to focus on poetry, disappointing Frank, and puts his romantic pursuits on hold. Kevin's song for Betty, Veronica, Cheryl, and Toni faces disapproval. Betty and Veronica prioritize their friendship over Archie, while Cheryl and Toni quit the musical due to a song about their relationship. Kevin grapples with his parents' divorce, and Principal Featherhead rejects his musical. Kevin vents his frustrations, but the other students offer support after Clay explains his perspective.
132	15	"Chapter One Hundred Thirty-Two: Miss Teen Riverdale"	Michael Goi	Aaron Allen & Chrissy Maroon	July 19, 2023	T13.23915	0.22
Riverdale's beauty pageant, which will be broadcast on live television, arrives. The girls compete, coached by Alice, who tells Betty she won in her day, and had dreams of being a stewardess and traveling before she married Hal. After noticing Ethel feeling left out, Betty encourages her to join in, while Alice realizes Midge is pregnant, and has her sent to the Sisters of Quiet Mercy. Ethel decides to participate in her place, but Alice refuses, so Betty and Veronica blackmail Hal into allowing it, while Cheryl and Toni console Fangs, eventually getting him a phone call with Midge. Ethel wins the pageant after singing "Who Will Love Me As I Am", though it is later shown Alice lied and the judges actually chose Betty.
133	16	"Chapter One Hundred Thirty-Three: Stag"	Rob Seidenglanz	Ryan Terrebonne	July 26, 2023	T13.23916	0.16
Julian gets a pornographic film, which Veronica allows him to screen at the Babylonium, only for it to be shut down when Betty finds out her sister Polly is the star of it. She contacts Polly, who comes to Riverdale and admits she is now a burlesque dancer, which Alice and Hal know about. She also tells Betty and Veronica she is engaged, and agrees to perform her act for the women at the Babylonium. After Alice refuses to attend and Betty reprimands her, telling her she can't wait to leave Riverdale forever, Alice slaps her. After being told about the Beats, Archie is aroused watching a wrestling film with Reggie, who is also aroused. They later have a questionable encounter with a prostitute, Twyla, and tell each other they love each other. Cheryl and Toni do a photoshoot in lingerie. Jughead attempts to help Mr. Fieldstone come to terms with Dr. Werthers and the board censoring comics, but Dr. Werthers tells him the terms are already set. Veronica consoles Jughead, and they reignite their relationship.
134	17	"Chapter One Hundred Thirty-Four: A Different Kind of Cat"	Kevin Rodney Sullivan	Ariana Jackson & Evan Kyle	August 2, 2023	T13.23917	0.21
Josie McCoy, an actress, comes to Riverdale to screen her new film at the Babylonium, and befriends Veronica, who is now openly in a relationship with Jughead. Archie, attempting to get more experience for his poetry, is rejected by Twyla, and performs a poem about Mrs. Grundy, who rejects him and tells him to write about his greatest pain. He writes a poem about his father, but Frank disapproves. Betty tries to write a book about her newsletter, and discovers Cheryl and Toni are dating. She admits she is the writer of the newsletter and asks them to do a photoshoot starring her. They do, using one of the photos as the cover for the book, and Cheryl later tells her about masturbation. Inspired by Veronica, Jughead creates a new comic character, Sabrina the Teenage Witch, only for the publishers to reject it. Toni introduces Fangs to Josie, who recognizes his talent and offers to connect him to her producer. Despite problems at the screening, the movie is a success, and Josie suggests to Veronica that she should direct movies instead of managing a theater.
135	18	"Chapter One Hundred Thirty-Five: For a Better Tomorrow"	Gregory Smith	Ted Sullivan & Greg Murray	August 9, 2023	T13.23918	0.22
Sheriff Keller kills a man suffering from radiation poisoning, revealing ties to the Blossom family. Archie contemplates joining the merchant marines, but his father's influence pushes him toward the army. Mary, Archie's mother, learns of this and kicks Frank out, leading to a reconciliation between Archie and Frank. Jughead discovers a connection between the milkman's victims and the Blossoms and convinces Cheryl to investigate. Cheryl overhears her parents speaking Russian, finds a room full of milkman uniforms, and discovers a bunker connected to Dilton. They report the Blossoms to the FBI, exposing them as Russian spies building bombs. Meanwhile, the girls sign up for driver's education, leading Betty to uncover a family secret: Hal had an affair with Ethel's mother, making Ethel his biological daughter. Betty forgives her parents and offers to adopt Ethel, but she chooses to leave Riverdale.
136	19	"Chapter One Hundred Thirty-Six: The Golden Age of Television"	Tara Dafoe	Roberto Aguirre-Sacasa & Tessa Leigh Williams	August 16, 2023	T13.23919	0.19
Principal Featherhead resigns, replaced by Waldo Weatherbee who rehires Mrs. Thornton. Archie plans to work at a basketball camp but takes Reggie's place at the farm. Cheryl regains control of the River Vixens and openly acknowledges her relationship with Toni. Betty's book is published, deepening her bond with Alice. Jughead's comic is rejected but eventually published, leading to the closure of Pep Comics. Veronica and Clay decide to adapt the story into a movie. Kevin sees Tom and Frank together. Jughead reunites with Tabitha, learning the future is secure but they can't return. Tabitha offers to restore their memories, which they agree to. They decide to keep only the good memories, though Betty and Jughead choose to remember the bad as well.
137	20	"Chapter One Hundred Thirty-Seven: Goodbye, Riverdale"	Roberto Aguirre-Sacasa	Roberto Aguirre-Sacasa	August 23, 2023	T13.23920	0.21
In the present day, after reading the obituary for a recently-deceased Jughead, an aged Betty tells her granddaughter Alice she wants to return to Riverdale one last time. The night before they leave, she sees an apparition of Jughead as a teenager, who brings her back to the day they graduated high school. Passing through her house, the school, the coffee shop, Thornhill, and eventually ending at Pop Tate's grave, she recalls the final fates of all her friends and their families, including her own. The next day, Alice and her husband bring Betty back to Riverdale, now a ghost town, and stop in front of Pop's, now out of business, only for her to die in the back seat. A teenage Betty leaves the car and walks into a functional Pop's in the Sweet Hereafter, reuniting with all of her high school friends in the afterlife.

== Ratings ==
=== Season 6 ===
Viewership and ratings per episode of List of Riverdale episodes
No.	Title	Air date	Rating (18–49)	Viewers (millions)	DVR (18–49)	DVR viewers (millions)	Total (18–49)	Total viewers (millions)
1	"Chapter Ninety-Six: Welcome to Rivervale"	November 16, 2021	0.1	0.33	0.1	0.27	0.2	0.61
2	"Chapter Ninety-Seven: Ghost Stories"	November 23, 2021	0.1	0.34	0.1	0.31	0.2	0.65
3	"Chapter Ninety-Eight: Mr. Cypher"	November 30, 2021	0.1	0.26	0.1	0.26	0.1	0.52
4	"Chapter Ninety-Nine: The Witching Hour(s)"	December 7, 2021	0.1	0.27	0.1	0.18	0.1	0.45
5	"Chapter One Hundred: The Jughead Paradox"	December 14, 2021	0.1	0.29	0.1	0.24	0.2	0.53
6	"Chapter One Hundred and One: Unbelievable"	March 20, 2022	0.1	0.23	0.1	0.27	0.1	0.50
7	"Chapter One Hundred and Two: Death at a Funeral"	March 27, 2022	0.1	0.21	0.1	0.20	0.1	0.41

No DVR ratings are available after the seventh episode, or for the seventh season.
