= Chapter Seventy-Nine: Graduation =

- Riverdale episode
- Several of the main characters during their high school graduation
- Episode no.: Season 5 Episode 3
- Directed by: Gabriel Correa
- Written by: Roberto Aguirre-Sacasa
- Cinematography by: Ronald Paul Richard
- Editing by: Adam Reich
- Production code: T13.22703
- Original air date: February 3, 2021
- Running time: 42 minutes

Episode chronology
← Previous "Chapter Seventy-Eight: The Preppy Murders"	Next → "Chapter Eighty: Purgatorio"

"Chapter Seventy-Nine: Graduation" is the third episode of the fifth season of the American television series Riverdale. The episode was written by Roberto Aguirre-Sacasa and directed by Gabriel Correa. It originally aired on The CW in the United States on February 3, 2021.

The plot revolves around the main high school student characters of the show graduating from high school and moving on with their lives outside of the titular town of Riverdale. The episode received overwhelmingly positive reviews, with several reviewers noting the emotional impact of the graduation and the grounded nature of the episode compared to other episodes of the series. In its initial broadcast, it was watched by 0.557 million viewers.

== Plot ==
Following the revelation in the previous episode that Jellybean Jones was the person creating the mysterious videotapes that had been showing up around Riverdale, her father FP decides to take her back to live with her mom in Toledo, Ohio. He also resigns as sheriff of Riverdale and says he will be staying with her in Toledo. While Jellybean's brother Jughead says he wants to come with them, FP rebuffs him and tells him to focus on college, as he had recently been accepted to the University of Iowa.

On their last day at Riverdale High School, the seniors reminisce over their yearbooks and reflect on the time they've spent at the school. A time capsule buried in 1945 is opened and one of the items is a photograph of four seniors taken right before the four were deployed to war. Meanwhile, Mr. Weatherbee, the principal, tells Archie Andrews that he will be unable to graduate and will have to retake his senior year of high school. However, he still allows Archie to participate in the graduation ceremony and asks him to record a song for the event. Later that night, Veronica Lodge visits Archie and, although the two of them had broken up several weeks earlier, they spend the night together. At the graduation ceremony, Betty Cooper gives a valedictorian speech talking about the events that the seniors have gone through and how she has hope for a better future in Riverdale and for the graduating seniors. The ceremony occurs with Archie's recording of "Good Riddance (Time of Your Life)". Meanwhile, Cheryl Blossom's mother Penelope, who clandestinely attended the ceremony, tells her daughter that she is turning herself over to the police for some of the crimes she had earlier committed.

After graduation, Archie, Betty, Cheryl, Jughead, Veronica, Kevin Keller, Reggie Mantle, and Toni Topaz bury a time capsule with some of their own personal items. Archie, inspired by the photograph, talks to some Army recruiters and enlists, and when he reveals this to Betty, Jughead, and Veronica, Veronica leaves, saying she cannot support his decision. Later, Jughead reveals how he has noticed how odd their friends have been since prom. Realizing that Archie must've confessed to Veronica, Betty finally tells Jughead that she and Archie had kissed, which led to their breakup. The next morning, Jughead drives Archie to the bus stop for him to go to basic training. At the same time, Betty and Veronica talk about what happened and, deciding to talk to Archie before he leaves, go to the bus stop, but Jughead tells them the bus had just left. The three of them catch up to the bus and say their goodbyes to Archie, with he and Veronica saying they love each other, before he boards the bus again.

Over the summer, Veronica leaves Riverdale to live with her mother in the Hamptons, while Betty leaves to go to Yale University and Jughead departs to Iowa. One year later, honoring a vow the four had made, Jughead returns to Riverdale to meet with his friends at Pop's Chock'lit Shoppe, though they do not come. In a voiceover just before the end credits, Jughead reveals that it would be six years before the four of them would see each other again.

== Cast and characters ==
=== Starring ===
- KJ Apa as Archie Andrews
- Lili Reinhart as Betty Cooper
- Camila Mendes as Veronica Lodge
- Cole Sprouse as Jughead Jones
- Marisol Nichols as Hermione Lodge
- Madelaine Petsch as Cheryl Blossom
- Mark Consuelos as Hiram Lodge
- Casey Cott as Kevin Keller
- Skeet Ulrich as F.P. Jones
- Charles Melton as Reggie Mantle
- Vanessa Morgan as Toni Topaz
- Drew Ray Tanner as Fangs Fogarty
- Mädchen Amick as Alice Cooper

=== Guest starring ===
- Nathalie Boltt as Penelope Blossom
- Doreen Calderon as Nana Topaz
- Jordan Connor as Sweet Pea
- Martin Cummins as Tom Keller
- Molly Ringwald as Mary Andrews
- Peter James Bryant as Waldo Weatherbee
- Trinity Likins as Jellybean Jones
- Jordan Robinson as Toby
- Alvin Sanders as Pop Tate
- Barbara Wallace as Rose Blossom

=== Co-starring ===
- Chris Cannon as Dr. Beaker
- Marion Eisman as Doris Bell
- Marlon Kazadi as Malcolm Moore
- Gaston Norrison as Bus Driver
- Klarc Wilson as Officer Bradshaw

== Production ==
The episode was originally intended to serve as the season finale for season 4. However, production on the final three scheduled episodes for season 4 was postponed due to the COVID-19 pandemic. As a result, "Chapter Seventy-Nine: Graduation" aired as the third episode of the fifth season.

== Reception ==
=== Critical reception ===
The episode received overwhelmingly positive reviews. Film website CinemaBlend ranked it number 10 on their list of the best episodes of Riverdale (as of December 5, 2021). In their review of the episode, they highlighted the emotional impact of the characters' graduations and cited the episode as the best of an otherwise bad season of the show. However, they stated that the characters returning to Riverdale shortly afterwards deflates some of the emotional intensity of the episode. The A.V. Club gave the episode an A− rating, praising KJ Apa's performance. Den of Geek gave the episode 5 out of 5 stars, calling the episode "arguably the most grounded episode the show has ever done…and maybe the best". In further discussing this, the reviewer states, "But what feels revolutionary here is that this episode is excellent while still being rooted firmly in reality. Riverdale can still be compelling by just focusing on the friendships that bind these characters without relying on narrative gimmicks."

=== Ratings ===
The episode was watched by 0.557 million viewers and received a television rating of 0.1 in the key demographic of 18- to 49-year-olds.
