= Speak No Evil (2024 film) =

American film by James Watkins

- Theatrical release poster
- Directed by: James Watkins
- Screenplay by: James Watkins
- Based on: Speak No Evil by: Christian Tafdrup; and Mads Tafdrup
- Produced by: Jason Blum; Paul Ritchie
- Starring: James McAvoy; Mackenzie Davis; Aisling Franciosi; Alix West Lefler; Dan Hough; Scoot McNairy
- Cinematography: Tim Maurice-Jones
- Edited by: Jon Harris
- Music by: Danny Bensi; Saunder Jurriaans
- Production company: Blumhouse Productions
- Distributed by: Universal Pictures
- Release dates: September 9, 2024 (DGA Theater); September 13, 2024 (United States)
- Running time: 110 minutes
- Country: United States
- Language: English
- Budget: $15 million
- Box office: $77.2 million

Speak No Evil is a 2024 American psychological horror thriller film written and directed by James Watkins. A remake of the 2022 Danish-Dutch film of the same name, the film stars James McAvoy, Mackenzie Davis, Aisling Franciosi, Alix West Lefler, Dan Hough, and Scoot McNairy. Its plot follows an American family who are invited to stay at a remote farmhouse of a British couple for the weekend: the hosts soon test the limits of their guests as the situation escalates. Jason Blum serves as a producer through his Blumhouse Productions banner.

Speak No Evil premiered at the DGA Theater in New York City on September 9, 2024, and was released in the United States by Universal Pictures on September 13. The film received positive reviews from critics and grossed $77 million worldwide with a budget of $15 million.

== Plot ==
While vacationing in Italy, American couple Ben and Louise Dalton and their preteen daughter Agnes, who live in London, meet and befriend British couple Paddy and Ciara and their son Ant, who cannot communicate verbally. Ciara explains that he was born with a genetic condition that caused a smaller tongue and aphasia. After returning home, Paddy and Ciara invite the Daltons to their remote farmhouse in Devon for the weekend, and they accept.

The Daltons are warmly welcomed, but they soon become unnerved by Paddy and Ciara's increasingly inappropriate behaviour and their aggressive treatment of Ant. During dinner, Paddy rudely challenges Louise's vegetarianism and jokingly simulates a sex act with Ciara, shocking their guests. Later, Louise finds Agnes and Ant sharing a bed with a drunken Paddy and Ciara. Horrified, the Daltons attempt to leave, but Agnes realises she has forgotten her favourite stuffed animal, Hoppy, forcing them to return.

Paddy and Ciara apologise, and the Daltons agree to stay to keep the peace. However, their behaviour remains unsettling. Ant steals Paddy's keys and takes Agnes to a locked shed, where she discovers a collection of luggage and personal possessions, along with photographs of Paddy and Ciara with several other families. This reveals that they are serial killers who lure families to their farmhouse, rob and murder them, and cut out the tongues of their children. Agnes pretends to have her first period, allowing her to get Ben and Louise alone and explain what she has discovered. Horrified, they decide to leave peacefully and return with the police to rescue Ant.

After discovering that their secret has been exposed, Paddy and Ciara, aided by their accomplice Mike, sabotage the Daltons' escape and capture them. They force the family to transfer their life savings before preparing to kill them and cut out Agnes's tongue. Louise attacks and injures Paddy, enabling the Daltons to flee into the house with Ant. During the ensuing struggle, Louise kills Mike with a hammer and saves Ben before they escape to the roof, where Ciara attempts to shoot them with a shotgun. Louise strikes her, causing Ciara slide down the roof and land headfirst into the ground, killing her.

As the Daltons try to leave, Paddy appears with Agnes at gunpoint and declares his intention to replace Ciara with her as his companion. Agnes manages to inject him with a syringe of ketamine that had been intended for her, incapacitating him. As the Daltons depart, Ant approaches Paddy. After Paddy accepts his fate by telling Ant, "That's my boy", Ant bludgeons him to death with a brick, releasing his accumulated pain and anger as the Daltons watch in horror. The traumatised family and Ant finally leave the farmhouse. On the drive home, Agnes gives Hoppy to Ant, who quietly sobs with relief.

== Cast ==
- James McAvoy as Paddy
- Mackenzie Davis as Louise Dalton
- Scoot McNairy as Ben Dalton
- Aisling Franciosi as Ciara
- Alix West Lefler as Agnes Dalton
- Dan Hough as Ant
- Kris Hitchen as Mike
- Motaz Malhees as Muhjid

== Production ==
The house in the film was the Saxon's Lode Manor House.

James Watkins wrote and directed the film for Blumhouse Productions. It is a remake of the 2022 Danish film of the same name. In April 2023, James McAvoy and Mackenzie Davis were reported to be in the cast. The following month, Scoot McNairy joined the cast.

Principal photography took place in Croatian settlements of Grožnjan, Motovun and Kaldir, and in Gloucester, England, in May and was expected to end in July, before filming was suspended five days before it was to wrap up due to the 2023 SAG-AFTRA strike. In mid-November, production resumed in the United Kingdom, filming at Saxon's Lode Manor House near Malvern Hills, Worcestershire. The manor's architecture provided the desired English backdrop for the movie's tense scenes.

== Release ==
Speak No Evil premiered at the DGA Theater in New York City on September 9, 2024, and was released in theaters by Universal Pictures on September 13, 2024.

== Reception ==
=== Box office ===
Speak No Evil grossed $36.9 million in the United States and Canada, and $40.3 million in other territories, for a worldwide total of $77.2 million. Deadline Hollywood calculated the film made a net profit of $50 million.

In the United States and Canada, Speak No Evil was released alongside The Killer's Game and Am I Racist?, and was projected to gross $10–13 million from 3,375 theaters in its opening weekend. The film made $4.9 million on its first day, including $1.3 million from Thursday night previews. It went on to debut to $11.5 million, finishing second behind holdover Beetlejuice Beetlejuice. In its second weekend the film made $5.9 million (a drop of 48%), finishing in third.

=== Critical response ===
On the review aggregator website Rotten Tomatoes, 83% of 213 critics' reviews are positive, with an average rating of 6.8/10. The website's consensus reads: "Harnessing sick suspense from the glimmer in James McAvoy's eye, Speak No Evil is the remake that hushes up concerns of 'been there, done that.'" Metacritic, which uses a weighted average, assigned the film a score of 66 out of 100, based on 41 critics, indicating "generally favorable" reviews. Audiences polled by CinemaScore gave the film an average grade of "B+" on an A+ to F scale.

=== Accolades ===
Dan Hough was nominated for the "Young British/Irish Performer of the Year" at the 45th annual London Film Critics Circle Awards 2024.
