= 42nd Young Artist Awards =

2021 US media awards ceremony

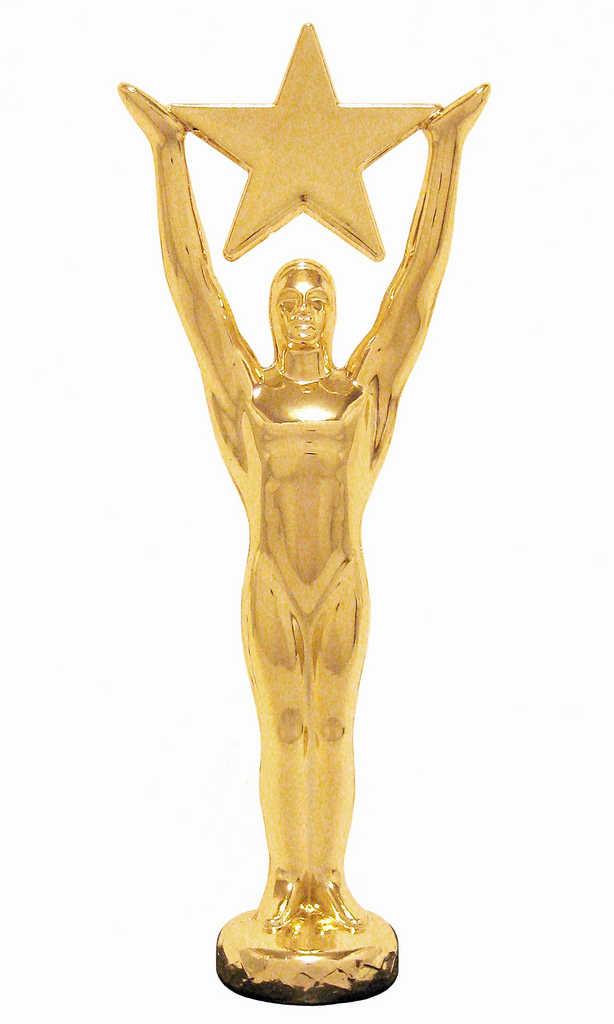
- Awarded for: Achievement during the year 2020 in film, television, streaming, and new media
- Date: November 6, 2021
- Site: Online (due to COVID-19 pandemic)

The 42nd Young Artist Awards ceremony, presented by the Young Artist Association, honored excellence of young performers between the ages of 5 and 18 in film, television, streaming series, and new media for the 2020 calendar year. Winners and nominees are listed below.

== Winners and nominees ==
=== Best Performance in a Feature Film ===
Best Performance in a Feature Film – Leading Teen Artist	Best Performance in a Feature Film – Leading Young Artist
★ Ammon Jacob Ford – Downhill: Courtnè Alyssa Moran – Horse Camp: A Love Tail; Erich Schuett – Song of the Tree Frogs	★ Braden Balazik – Finding Grace: Christopher Convery – Brahms: The Boy II; Jordan Nash – Come Away
Best Performance in a Feature Film – Supporting Youth Artist	
★ Josh Elliott Pickel – Abe: Sammy Voit – To Dust; Summer Howell – Hunter Hunter	

=== Best Performance in a Short Film ===
Best Performance in a Short Film – Teen Actor	Best Performance in a Short Film – Teen Actress
★ Alexander Statkov – His Cannibal Granny: Brandin Stennis – Black Boys; Dylan Duff – Perspective; Jordan Poole – Take It Easy; Sammy Voit – How to Be a Man	★ Carissa Bazler – The Girl in the Woods: Jessica Perl – Rip Current; Lacey Caroline – Harbor Island; Maya Jai Pinson – I'm Ready; Montana Jacobowitz – Mood
Best Performance in a Short Film – Young Actor	Best Performance in a Short Film – Young Actress
★ Édouard B. Larocque – Rebel: Estovan Reizo Cheah – Silence; Jordan Nash – The Chippie; Mason Cufari – Pause; Mateo Ray – The Divisible; Tristan Riggs – Mawiage Stowy	★ Ava Torres – Hard to Place: Avery Garcia – Your Hands in My Hair; Cadence Goblirsch – For Kate; Ines Feghouli – Rebel; Maci Wealleans – Pause; Samarah Conley – Aperture

=== Best Performance in a Streaming Film ===
Best Performance in a Streaming Film – Teen Actor	Best Performance in a Streaming Film – Teen Actress
★ Aryan Simhadri – The Main Event: Brandin Stennis – Love on a Two-Way Street; Ferdia Shaw – Artemis Fowl; Grayson Thorne Kilpatrick – Black Pumpkin; Joshua Packard – The Truth About Santa Claus; Sammy Voit – I Am Not a Mouse	★ Caylin Turner – This Was America: Hadar Cats – My Dad's Christmas Date; Lauren McNamara – Aliens Stole My Body; Nicole Elizabeth Berger – Clover; Samantha Bailey – 1 Night in San Diego
Best Performance in a Streaming Film – Young Actor	Best Performance in a Streaming Film – Young Actress
★ Kei – Timmy Failure: Mistakes Were Made: Owen Osborne – The Place We Hide; Sebastian Billingsley‑Rodriguez – Love, Guaranteed	★ Brooklyn Robinson – Escape: Puzzle of Fear: Carmela Guizzo – Aliens Stole My Body; Deborah Osmani – Heckle; Eva Ariel Binder – You Are My Home; Juliette Maxyme Proulx – The Decline

=== Best Performance in a Streaming Series ===
Best Performance in a Streaming Series – Leading Teen Actor	Best Performance in a Streaming Series – Leading Teen Actress
★ Jesse van Olderen – GameBoy Hassan's Big Adventure: Oscar Castan – NexGen News; Sammy Voit – My Poyfect Kitchen	★ Alina Prijono – Detention Adventure: Brianni Walker – Poor Dad Has No Money on Christmas Eve; Isabella Bazler – The Anomalyst; Lacey Caroline – NASCAR Kids
Best Performance in a Streaming Series – Leading Young Artist	Best Performance in a Streaming Series – Teen Actor
★ Duncan Joiner – Tales from the Loop: Logan Marber – The Holiday Holly Jolly Showcase; Makenzie Lee‑Foster – Emily's Wonder Lab	★ Mathieu Silverman – Quaran‑Teen(s): Oscar Castan – The Morning Show; Sammy Voit – When I Meet Corona
Best Performance in a Streaming Series – Teen Actress	Best Performance in a Streaming Series – Young Actor
★ Athena Park – Ghostwriter: Gracie Silva – Stagrassle Paranormal; Jessica Mikayla – Diary of a Future President; Montana Jacobowitz – 2Real4U	★ Billy Jenkins – Cursed: Ian Nunney – Star Trek: Picard; Mateo Ray – Magic for Humans; Sebastian Billingsley‑Rodriguez – The Baby‑Sitters Club; Temi Blaev – Killing Eve
Best Performance in a Streaming Series – Young Actress	
★ Grace Sunar – Helstrom: Logan Marber – One Minute Meetings with Logan; Madeline Hirvonen – 50 States of Fright; Maya Delgado – Ghostwriter	

=== Best Performance in a TV Movie ===
Best Performance in a TV Movie – Teen Actor	Best Performance in a TV Movie – Teen Actress
★ Callum Seagram Airlie – Upside‑Down Magic: JT Church – The Christmas Waltz; Tyson Larter – The Angel Tree	★ Alison Fernandez – Upside‑Down Magic: Islie Hirvonen – Christmas with the Darlings; Lauren McNamara – Hearts of Winter
Best Performance in a TV Movie – Young Actor	Best Performance in a TV Movie – Young Actress
★ Gabriel Jacob‑Cross – Fashionably Yours: Mattia Castrillo – The Christmas House; Sebastian Billingsley‑Rodriguez – Christmas on the Vine	★ Alix West Lefler – Cranberry Christmas: Cassidy Nugent – Just for the Summer; Grace Sunar – A Christmas Tree Grows in Colorado; Madeline Hirvonen – Love, Lights, Hanukkah!

=== Best Performance in a TV Series ===
Best Performance in a TV Series – Leading Youth Artist	Best Performance in a TV Series – Supporting Teen Actor
★ Alex R. Hibbert – The Chi: Raphael Alejandro – Bunk'd; Sammy Voit – Food Network Star Kids; Winta McGrath – Raised by Wolves	★ Christian Michael Cooper – Supernatural: David Bolinger – Kid Stew; Felix Jamieson – Raised by Wolves
Best Performance in a TV Series – Supporting Teen Actress	Best Performance in a TV Series – Supporting Young Artist
★ Amanda Cheung – Lockdown: Olivia Edward – Better Things; Tamara Smart – The Worst Witch	★ Édouard B. Larocque – Épidémie: Juliette Maxyme Proulx – Épidémie; Mason Cufari – Evil Lives Here: Shadows of Death
Best Performance in a Television Series – Guest Starring Teen Artist	Best Performance in a Television Series – Guest Starring Young Actor
★ Chandler Dean – Black‑ish: Daria Johns – Mixed-ish; Grayson Thorne Kilpatrick – Dave	★ Aidan Bertola – 9-1-1: Lone Star: Ayush Rajmachikar – Discover Chuggington; Liam Patenaude – Transplant; Major Dodge Jr. – Roswell: New Mexico
Best Performance in a Television Series – Guest Starring Young Actress	Best Performance in a Television Series – Recurring Teen Artist
★ Isla Sunar – Charmed: Madeline Hirvonen – DC's Legends of Tomorrow; Sarah Bazler – Buried in the Backyard	★ Graydon Yosowitz – The Plot Against America: Christian Michael Cooper – When Calls the Heart; Cameron Mann – For Life
Best Performance in a Television Series – Recurring Young Actor	Best Performance in a Television Series – Recurring Young Actress
★ Antonio Raul Corbo – Brooklyn Nine-Nine: Kei – Just Roll With It; London Cheshire – Young Sheldon; Tim Luca Schmidt – Schmitz & Family	★ Alix West Lefler – Siren: Ava Grace Cooper – When Calls the Heart; Celina Smith – Young Dylan; Mia Bella – Gabby Duran and the Unsittables; Tamaki Shiratori – Gokushufudo

=== Best Performance in a TV Commercial ===
Best Performance in a TV Commercial – Teen Actor	Best Performance in a TV Commercial – Young Actress
★ Édouard B. Larocque – Mycose Monstre: Estian Reiner Cheah – 2020: Best Year; Estovan Reizo Cheah – Science Centre Singapore; Mason Cufari – Honor 8X; Sebastian Billingsley-Rodriguez – Hyundai Canada	★ Grace Sunar – Lilly: Emgality: Ines Feghouli – OIQ; Isla Sunar – Brita: Stepping Up; Juliette Maxyme Proulx – Jean Coutu: La Rentrée; Mia Denae' Brathwaite – The Challengers with Naomi Osaka

=== Best Performance in a Voice Acting Role ===
Best Performance in a Voice Acting Role – Youth Actor	Best Performance in a Voice Acting Role – Youth Actress
★ Eli D. Goss – 3D Build and Play: Liam Patenaude – The Ollie and Moon Show; Raphael Alejandro – Mickey Mouse Mixed-Up Adventures	★ Cadence Goblirsch – Wolves in the Walls: Cali Poley – Kiju Organic Juice; Eva Ariel Binder – Stillwater; Gracie Silva – Legitimately Mallie Podcast; Juju Brener – Red Shoes and the Seven Dwarfs; Rosalie Turmel – The Ollie and Moon Show

=== Best Performance in a Music Video ===
Best Performance in a Music Video – Youth Artist

★ Bradley Bundlie – Yellow Submarine Parody

- Brodie Mullin – Warrior
- Caylin Turner – Can't Be Myself
- Jonah Paull – Home
- Toria Towery – Escape
- Tristan Riggs – I Remember Way Too Much

=== Outstanding Awards ===
Outstanding Music Vocalist	Outstanding Music Single
★ Adrian Macéus – Get Your Number: Isla Croll – All About You; Trinity Rose – Make It Out Alive	★ Brianni Walker – We Must Rise Up, Stop Bullying: Estovan Reizo Cheah – Forever My Friends; Pooja Kylasa – New Rules; Samarah Conley – Movin' On; Trinity Rose – Morning Text; Valentyna Sichko – Motivators
Outstanding Dancer	Outstanding Influencer
★ David Tengblad – Dante's Heartbeats: Mia Denae' Brathwaite – Queen of the Night; Noah Epps – Marionette	★ Elle Gabriel: Estovan Reizo Cheah; Summer G
Outstanding Podcast Host	Outstanding Writer (Author)
★ Gabriel Silva – Just Talk With Gabe: Sammy Jaye – Let's Be Real; Skylie Folkers – Let's Talk Life	★ Dylan Duff – The Girl in the Road: Josh Elliott Pickel – Open to Interpretation; Kei – Covid Chronicles: Life on the Inside; Mathieu Silverman – Quaran‑Teen(s)
Outstanding Writer (Authoress)	Outstanding Producer
★ Ella Jerrier – The Waiting Room: Marissa Lear – Cut Off; Maya Jai Pinson – I'm Ready	★ Ella Jerrier – The Waiting Room: Josh Elliott Pickel – Lost & Found; Max Hendrickson – Enkata; Maya Jai Pinson – I'm Ready

=== Outstanding Director ===
Outstanding Director

★ Dylan Duff – The Girl in the Road

- Ella Jerrier – The Waiting Room
- Jordan Poole – The QuaranTEEN
- Josh Elliott Pickel – Lost & Found
- Kei – Covid Chronicles: Life on the Inside
- Sammy Voit – The Bus Stop

== Special awards ==
- Empowering Youth in Entertainment Award – Regina King
- Inspiration to Youth Award – Tiffany Haddish
- Genius Award – Martin Lawrence
