= Hiram Lodge =

- Archie Comics character
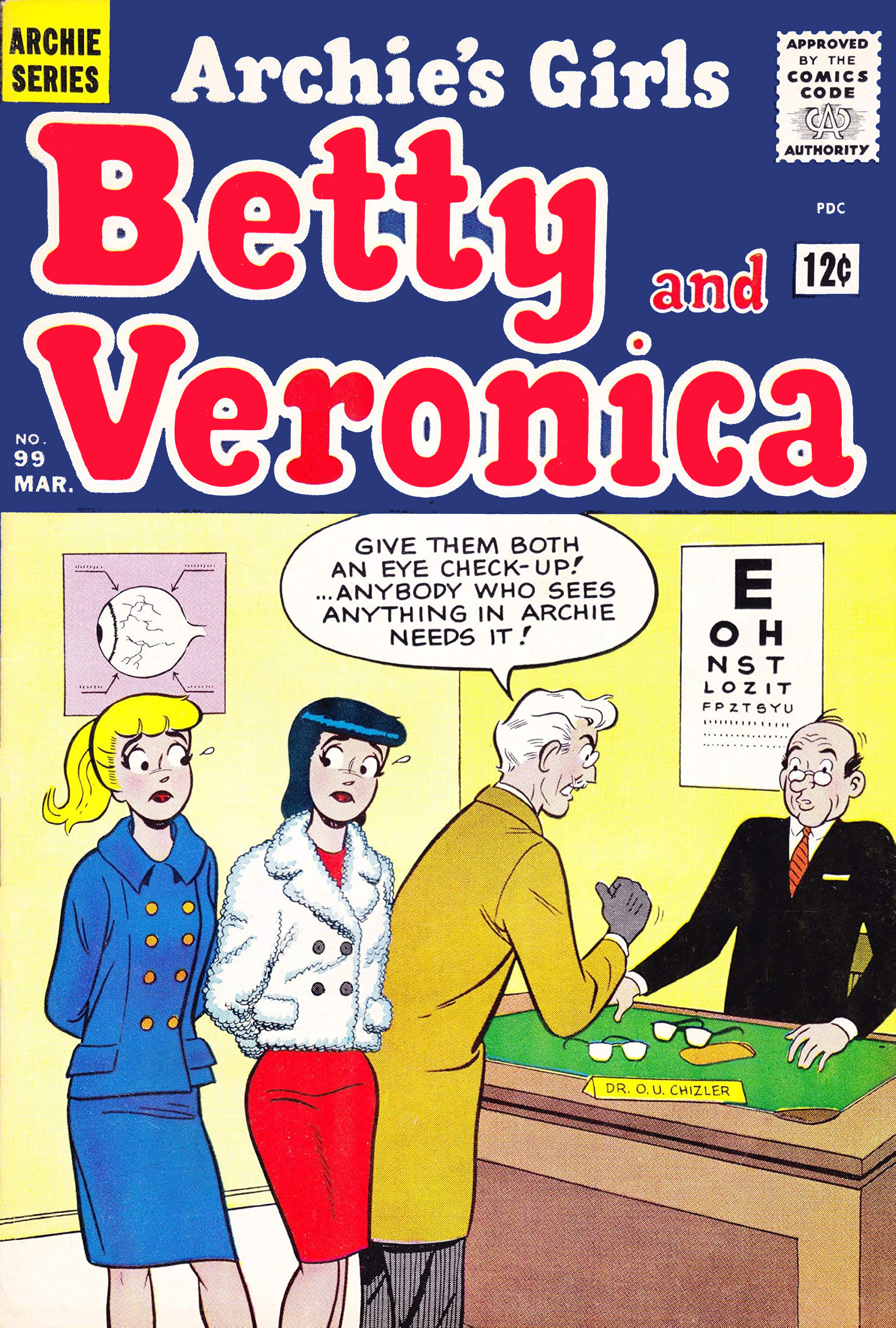
- Lodge (second from right) on the cover of Betty and Veronica #99 (March 1964)
- First appearance: Pep Comics #31 (September 1942)
- Created by: Bob Montana
- Voiced by: Dallas McKennon (1968–1969); John Michael Lee (1999–2002)
- Portrayed by: James Noble (Archie: To Riverdale and Back Again); Mark Consuelos (Riverdale, Katy Keene); Alyy Khan (The Archies)

In-universe information
- Title(s): CEO and Owner of Lodge Industries
- Occupation: Businessman
- Spouse: Hermione Lodge
- Children: Veronica Lodge (daughter)
- Relatives: Marcy McDermott (niece)
- Hometown: Riverdale

Hiram Burton P. Lodge is a fictional character in the Archie Comics series. He is a father to the series' protagonist, Veronica Lodge and a husband to her mother, Hermione Lodge.

He is the owner and CEO of Lodge Industries, a multi-billion-dollar conglomerate. He is the richest man in Riverdale, a prominent businessman and the town's leading industrialist.

The family name was inspired by the Lodges, a Massachusetts Brahmin political family that previously commissioned a mural from Archie Comics creator Bob Montana.

Hiram is portrayed by Mark Consuelos in the television series Riverdale and Katy Keene.

== Background ==
Note: In some 'Archie' stories dating from the 1960s, he is referred to as J. P. Lodge, and in his first appearance in Pep Comics #31, he is referred to as Burton K. Lodge. One story gives his name as Mark.

Hiram Lodge dislikes Archie Andrews especially for Veronica, leading him to disapprove the idea of the two dating. Hiram tries to discourage Archie from visiting their household, because every time he does, something goes wrong, such as Archie accidentally breaking something valuable in the household or injuring him. He allows the pair to continue dating, however, as he understands how well Archie treats Veronica. In multiple stories, Archie saves Mr. Lodge from thieves, blackmailers, and underhanded business rivals, causing Hiram to begin softening up to Archie. On one occasion, he asks Archie and Jughead to act like they are his sons in order to secure a business deal with clients, which are from a culture that do not respect a person without sons. Taking advantage, the teens drive away in Lodge's new car and boss around Veronica and the Lodges' butler Smithers. However, a typhoon breaks out just in time when the clients attempt to leave, causing a tree to break and almost fall. Archie and Jughead save the day, enabling Lodge to secure the deal, and in his joy says, "You did great, sons!", much to Veronica and Smithers' chagrin.

In one story, Veronica claims that her "Daddy has billions", despite Hiram Lodge only being a multimillionaire. This is likely due to the extreme rise of wealth in the real world since the introduction of the Archie Comics, which means that Hiram would have to be a billionaire to keep up the pretense that he is one of the richest men in the world. In the comics, this is explained by the take-over of the Blossom corporation, owned by Cheryl Blossom's father.

Lodge is usually portrayed as a successful and wealthy businessman, rather than a financier or banker, who is frequently involved in international business ventures. He has a keen eye for unusual business opportunities that others overlook. In one story, a rival businessman thought that he had outmaneuvered Mr. Lodge by selling him a garbage dump for $2,000, yet Lodge easily retorted that he had covered the dump with artificial snow and turned it into a ski resort, which made him realize a windfall profit of over $2 million in its initial year of operation.

The stories about his childhood are contradictory as some suggest he was born into old money and is descended from the founders of Riverdale, while others state that he built his fortune from that of his in-laws. Lodge had also served in the U.S. Army at some point in his life.

Although political matters in the Archie comics are rarely mentioned, one storyline hinted that Hiram was a conservative. In the storyline, Archie had been shrunken and was forced to use a paper airplane to fly to the other side of the room. When it was suggested that they lean to the left, Veronica quipped that her dad hated anyone who leaned to the left.

Despite his old age, he remains physically fit and healthy, which in one story, Lodge attributes his strong physical fitness in having successfully chased Archie away.

== In other media ==
=== Animation ===
- Hiram appears sporadically in Archie's Weird Mysteries (1999–2000), voiced by John Michael Lee. His dislike of Archie is notably toned down, as they don't interact much on-screen. In the episode "Teen Out of Time", it is revealed that Mr. Lodge was the one who gave Pop Tate a bank loan to open his diner.
- Hiram appears briefly in the direct-to-video film, The Archies in JugMan (2002), with Lee reprising his role. Notably, his wife appears in the film too despite not being present in the TV series.

=== Live action ===
- Hiram appears in the 1990 television film, Archie: To Riverdale and Back Again, portrayed by James Noble. He is the main antagonist and anti-hero who wants to evict Pop Tate from his soda shop, under the pretext of expanding Reggie Mantle's gym. Just like in the comic books, he doesn't want Veronica dating Archie, as he finds them incompatible, and seeing his daughter flirt with him only emboldens him to go through with his plans.
- Hiram appears as a major antagonist on the CW series Riverdale, portrayed by Mark Consuelos. The pilot episode establishes that he is in New York City on trial for fraud and embezzlement, leading Hermione and Veronica to move to Riverdale to escape his notoriety. He and Fred Andrews were rivals in school, as Hiram stole Hermione from Fred and later married her. Hermione continues to help Hiram run his business and criminal empire from behind bars. In the second season, Hiram is released and returns to Riverdale, establishing himself as a threatening and powerful presence in the town. Just like the comic books and animated series, he hates Archie and doesn't want him to date Veronica. In the fourth season, he reveals he was born Jaime Luna but changed his name due to the bad reputation of the Luna family. In the fifth season episode "Chapter Eighty-Eight: Citizen Lodge", he tells Reggie Mantle about his father Javier Luna, who moved to Riverdale to work in palladium mines but ended up shining shoes. Hiram got tired of living in poverty and went to work for the gangster Vittorio "Vito" Alto, eventually taking over Vito's business when Vito disappeared.
- Consuelos reprises the role in the episode "Chapter Thirteen: Come Together" from the first season of Katy Keene, a spin-off of Riverdale.
