= Greg Murray =

American photographer (born 1981)

- Born: November 24, 1981 (age 44); Lakewood, Ohio
- Occupations: Animal Photographer and Author
- Years active: 2010 - Present

Greg Murray is an American photographer known for his photography of dogs.

== Biography ==
Murray was born and raised in Lakewood, Ohio and also spent time living in Albuquerque, New Mexico before returning to attend high school. He currently resides in Lakewood, Ohio with his wife and their two rescue dogs.

Murray attended Saint Ignatius High School (Cleveland) then Loyola University Chicago where he earned a business degree in Human Resources Management in 2004. He spent close to 10 years working in human resources before leaving the field in early 2014 to become a photographer. Murray began volunteering at animal shelters in the Cleveland, Ohio area by taking photos of animals that were up for adoption in order to house them. He started offering pet photography sessions to his clients, and by 2016, a majority of his photography work was dog-related.

=== Author ===
In May 2016, Murray signed a book deal with Gibbs Smith. Peanut Butter Dogs, a photograph collection of over 150 dogs eating peanut butter, was released on March 14, 2017.
