= Chapter Eighty-Eight: Citizen Lodge =

- Riverdale episode
- Episode no.: Season 5 Episode 12
- Directed by: James DeWille
- Written by: Brian E. Paterson
- Original air date: August 18, 2021
- Running time: 42 minutes

Guest appearances
- Ana Carrizales as Lourdes Luna; Sam Darkoh as Young Pop Tate; Michael Consuelos as Teenage Hiram Lodge / Jaime Luna; Louis Ferreira as Vittorio "Vito" Alto; Matthew Yang King as Adult Marty Mantle; Mishel Prada as Hermosa Lodge (voice); Ben Corns as Sam McPharlin; Wyatt Cameron as Jock #1 (Marty's Henchman); Sean Owen Roberts as Louis (Edgy Gangster); Daniel Lindsay as Sean McPharlin; Nikolai Witschl as Dr. Curdle, Jr.; Callum Gow as Shoeshine Boy

Episode chronology
← Previous "Chapter Eighty-Seven: Strange Bedfellows"	Next → "Chapter Eighty-Nine: Reservoir Dogs"

"Chapter Eighty-Eight: Citizen Lodge" is the 12th episode of the fifth season of the CW TV show Riverdale and the eighty-eighth episode of the show overall. It is directed by James DeWille with a script by Brian E. Paterson.

The main storyline in this episode is in flashbacks to 1988, a young Hiram Lodge/(Jaime Luna)'s rise to power in the criminal underworld, his interactions with gangsters in Riverdale, his complex relationship with his father Javier and the beginnings of his relationship with a young Hermione Gomez (later Lodge). In the present, Hiram tells this story to his protege and business partner Reggie Mantle who looks back on his relationship with his father Marty.

== Plot ==
=== Present ===
Hiram Lodge (Mark Consuelos) gets up for his daily routine of exercise routines and getting ready for his business whilst Reggie Mantle (Charles Melton) awaits customers at Mantle Motors. Realizing the month's debt hasn't been paid to Hiram, Reggie brings the suitcase of money to Hiram and demands a place in his business, Hiram promises to give Reggie a place if Reggie can get him a silent gun that can't be traced, Reggie agrees.

At Mantle Motors, Reggie and his father Marty (Matthew Yang King), show some customers a car for them to buy, when Marty tries to make a cheap deal with them and ruin the dealership's reputation, Reggie steps in and helps the customers buy the car. Marty later confronts Reggie about his behaviour, Reggie responds by saying that he has paid this month's debt to Hiram and will work for him now whilst also goading Marty to hit him like he used to.

Marty confronts Hiram, who tells him that Reggie is actually trying to be independent and helpful for once and that he is proud of him which Marty should also be. Marty later confronts Reggie at Mantle Motors and tells him about his meeting with Hiram. Reggie tells Marty that this is his idea on where to go in his life and that he is not going to take Marty's abuse anymore (Marty used to beat him when he was young and later on in high school), but now he is not going to take it anymore like he used to. Reggie leaves the dealership and his heartbroken father and walks back to Hiram.

At Hiram's office, Reggie tells him that he has disowned his father, causing Hiram to tell Reggie that this was not a good idea and starts telling Reggie his origin story and why he is obsessed with Riverdale.

=== Past ===
In 1988 in New York City, a teenage Jaime Luna (Michael Consuelos) watches his father Javier shoeshining wherein they get the idea to move to Riverdale on searching for Palladium. In Riverdale, Jaime attends Riverdale High whilst his father works at the factory, looking for Palladium. One day, the factory is shut down, causing Javier to lose his job and go back to shoeshining outside Pop's Chock-Litt Shoppe whilst his wife and Jaime's mother Lourdes (Ana Carrizales) finds a job as a waitress in Pop's.

At school, Jaime tries to win the affections of a young Hermione Gomez (Camila Mendes), however is rejected at every turn by her. One day, Hiram shines the shoes of gangster Vittorio "Vito" Alto (Louis Ferreira) who finds him a job as a delivery boy for his drug deals.

After a failed first date with Hermione and a bail out from prison, Jaime becomes a key benefactor and trusted soldier of Vito's. He finishes his date properly with Hermione and starts calling himself "Hiram Lodge". For this, he is made fun of by a teenage Marty Mantle whom he later beats up and is chided and yelled at by Javier and Lourdes.

Javier tells Vito to let Jaime go and leave the crime business; Vito responds by sending his hitmen who whack and murder Javier in front of Pop's. Devastated by his father's death, Vito's sudden disappearance after it and being told by Lourdes to get out of the business, Jaime responds by whacking and murdering Vito's guys and slowly becoming a powerful gangster in Riverdale. He marries Hermione, moves to New York to continue his criminal operations and witnesses the birth of his daughter Veronica.

=== Back to Present ===
After telling Reggie his whole story, Hiram persuades him to reunite with his father and fires him from his business for safety, telling him to give Marty a second chance and that he misses shoeshining with Javier. Reggie agrees and gives Hiram the silent gun before the two go their separate ways.

Reggie returns to Mantle Motors where he sees Marty crying. Marty apologizes to Reggie on the way he treated him in the past and the two hug and promise to have a better relationship this time around.

Meanwhile, Hiram tracks down an aging and on his deathbed Vito and kills him with the silent gun. Later on, he watches a documentary TV show featuring his ex-wife Hermione (Marisol Nichols) and his daughter Veronica who talk about him being a gangster and his role. Hiram then gets a call from his other illegitimate daughter Hermosa (Mishel Prada) who tells him "it's done" as the episode ends.

== Cast and characters ==
=== Main ===
- KJ Apa as Teenage Fred Andrews
- Lili Reinhart as Teenage Alice Smith
- Camila Mendes as Veronica Lodge / Teenage Hermione Gomez
- Cole Sprouse as Jughead Jones (voice) / Teenage FP Jones
- Madelaine Petsch as Teenage Penelope Blossom
- Marisol Nichols as Adult Hermione Lodge / Apollonia Gomez
- Charles Melton as Reggie Mantle / Teenage Marty Mantle
- Mark Consuelos as Adult Hiram Lodge / Javier Luna

== Reception ==
Den of Geek critic Chris Cummins gave a positive review of the episode and a 3.5/5 score, saying, "Citizen Lodge" works overtime to show the parallels between Hiram Lodge and Reggie Mantle. This all seemed a bit on the nose until the third act revelation that Hiram no longer wanted Reggie working for him. "If I could go back, spend a few more years shining my shoes with my dad, I'd do that in a heartbeat," he muses to his young employee. But Lodge also sees Reggie as a surrogate son, and his cutting him off from following in his footsteps is the most (only?) genuinely selfless act we've seen him commit. The Mantles have the chance to rebuild the relationship that Jaime and Javier Luna never could, and that's a graceful thing to come out of all the death and chaos Hiram has caused", whilst he also praised the episode for its simple and straightforward but emotional story, the performance of Michael Consuelos as Teenage Hiram/Jaime and its difference from his performance as Hiram in Chapter Thirty Nine: The Midnight Club and its references to other gangster films that it is inspired from alongside its allusions to Citizen Kane and how Hiram Lodge represents Charles Foster Kane.

TV Fanatic critic Justin Carreiro also gave a positive review for the episode and a 3.7/5 score, commending it for Michael Consuelos's portrayal as the teenage Hiram Lodge and how he added "heart to the character" whilst sounding just like him, the drive-by shooting death of Javier and how it mimics scenes from other media like The Godfather and Law & Order whilst also using Riverdale's 50s' aesthetics, Hiram avenging Javier by killing Vito and how cold and satisfying the death was and also Mendes's performance as the teenage Hermione in the episode and how great her relationship with the teenage Hiram/Jaime was shown. However, he did criticize the episode for scenes like Javier threatening to call the cops on Vito, unsubtly foreshadowing and leading to his cliché death next scene and Marty's apology to Reggie and Reggie accepting him back despite all the physical and emotional abuse he suffered from Marty his whole life as depicted in the show.

=== Ratings ===
The episode was watched by 0.474 million viewers and received a TV rating of 0.39 which was the key demographic of adults aged 18–49.
