= Delirium (Oliver novel) =

2011 novel by Lauren Oliver

- Author: Lauren Oliver
- Language: English
- Series: Delirium trilogy #1
- Genre: Young adult Science fiction Romance; Dystopian
- Publisher: HarperCollins
- Publication date: February 3, 2011
- Publication place: United States
- Media type: Print
- Pages: 480 pp
- ISBN: 9780061726828 (hardcover 1st ed.)
- OCLC: 641532050
- LC Class: PZ7.O475 Del 2011
- Followed by: Pandemonium

Delirium is a dystopian young adult romance novel written by Lauren Oliver, published in 2011 by HarperCollins under its HarperTeen division. The story focuses on a young woman, Lena Haloway, who falls in love in a society where love is seen as a disease. Delirium is the first novel in a trilogy, followed by Pandemonium (2012), and Requiem (2013).

== Plot ==
The story is set in Portland, Maine, in the year 2091. Civilization is concentrated in the cities that escaped the severe bombings decades earlier. Travel between these cities is highly restricted. Electric fences separate the city from the Wilds, unregulated territory that was presumably destroyed by bombs.

The totalitarian government teaches that love is a disease, Amor deliria Nervosa, commonly referred to as "the deliria." A surgical cure for deliria has been developed and is mandatory for citizens who are at least eighteen years old. Lena Haloway, an orphan, lives with her aunt, Carol, uncle, and two cousins, Jenny and Grace. Lena has an older sister, Rachel, who is "cured" of deliria and married.

Lena's best friend, Hana, is prettier, more popular, and richer than Lena. Lena is obedient, stays home after curfew, and listens to music that is approved by the DFA. Conversely, Hana is rebellious, goes to underground parties after curfew, and listens to music that is banned by the DFA.

However, only months before her scheduled procedure, Lena falls in love with an Invalid (a person who has not taken the Cure and lives in the Wilds), Alex. He was born in the Wilds outside the city and pretends to be cured to live undetected in the city and to partake in the resistance. He offers Lena the means of escape from the procedure that will destroy her ability to love.

While trying to gain Lena's trust and love, Alex finds out about her past life and family. When she mentions her "dead" mother and how she always wore a specific necklace, he knew who she is.

Alex wants to show Lena that her mother is actually alive. He brings her to the Crypts, where people who do not obey the rules stay, to show her that her mother is still alive. When they find her mother's room, they find it empty, with a life-size hole in the wall where the letter 'O' is in the word LOVE.

Lena now believes that her entire childhood was a lie and wants to leave the city and go to the Wilds. While Lena and Alex try to escape to the Wilds, the government finds them. Alex tells Lena to not look back and that he will be right there with her, but then she does and realizes that he never moved. She keeps running into the Wilds, where she joins the resistance, leaving Alex to presumably die. She then repeats her mother's last words to her to the reader: "I love you. Remember, they can't take it."

== Inspiration ==
Lauren Oliver has said that the inspiration for Delirium came to her one day at the gym. She had recently read a Gabriel García Márquez essay that stated all books were about either love or death. Since her first book, Before I Fall, was about death, she wanted to write a book about love. At the gym, she was watching a news report about a pandemic, and the two ideas combined in her head to form the central concept of the Delirium books.

== Reception ==
Delirium was a New York Times bestseller. It was released to largely positive reviews, including starred reviews from Kirkus Reviews and the School Library Journal. NPR wrote, "Oliver writes beautifully, with well-measured mastery. The references to The Book of Shhh and The Safety, Health and Happiness Handbook, 12th edition, are exquisitely artful touches."

== Sequels ==
Delirium is the first installment in the Delirium trilogy. Two short ebooks set between the first and second novels, Hana and Annabel, were released on February 28 and December 26, 2012, respectively. The second novel in the trilogy, Pandemonium, was released on February 28, 2012.

The third and final book in the trilogy, Requiem, was released on March 5, 2013. Another story, set between the second and third books of the trilogy, Raven, was also released separately on March 5, 2013 . The intermediate books were compiled into an omnibus, Delirium Stories: Hana, Annabel, and Raven, a book simultaneously released on March 5, 2013. It was the first time that these were print.

Alex, set between the first and second books like Hana and Annabel, was included inside the first edition of Requiem. A book including it was released as Delirium Stories: Hana, Annabel, Raven, & Alex.

== Adaptation ==
Fox ordered a television pilot based on Delirium. According to The Hollywood Reporter actress Emma Roberts was cast as Lena Haloway in the main role. In February 2013, Gregg Sulkin was cast as the role of Julian Fineman, one of Lena's love interests, but was changed to be the love interest of her best friend Hana Tate for the show. On February 25, 2013 Daren Kagasoff was cast as Alex Sheathes, the male lead and Lena's love interest. Karyn Usher penned the pilot, with Peter Chernin and Katherine Pope as executive producers. On March 1, 2013, Jeanine Mason was cast as Hana Tate. Fox later declined to pick up the pilot.

The pilot episode was picked up by Hulu and was available to stream for a limited time beginning on June 20, 2014.
