= Matyka =

Matyka is a Polish surname derived from the diminutive of a given name, such as Maciej, Mateusz (Matthew).

- Marvin Matyka (born June 1997) German music producer, editor and soundtrack creator
- Paweł Matyka, Polish photographer
