= Pandemonium (novel) =

2012 dystopian young adult novel by Lauren Oliver

- Author: Lauren Oliver
- Audio read by: Sarah Drew
- Language: English
- Series: Delirium trilogy #2
- Genre: Young adult Science fiction Romance; Dystopian
- Publisher: HarperTeen
- Publication date: February 28, 2012
- Publication place: United States
- Media type: Print (hardback, paperback), ebook, audiobook
- Pages: 383 pp
- ISBN: 9780061978067 (1st ed.)
- OCLC: 730414274
- Dewey Decimal: 813/.
- LC Class: PZ7.O475 Pan 2012
- Preceded by: Delirium
- Followed by: Requiem

Pandemonium is a 2012 dystopian young adult romance novel written by Lauren Oliver and the second novel in her Delirium trilogy. The book was first published on February 28, 2012 through HarperTeen, and follows the series' protagonist as she explores the Wilds beyond the walled community she was raised in. The book was preceded by the novella Hana and was succeeded by Requiem, the final book in the series.

== Plot ==
The book follows up the events of Delirium. Lena is now in the Wilds alone, and the sequel begins by switching the chapters from the present "now" and the past "then" point of view of Lena until they are joined together in Chapter 13.

However, the Wilds prove harsher and more dangerous than she expected. She becomes very weak and is found nearly dead by a group of people. She is nursed back to health by the group, who become her new family. She is now free of the "cure," but she and her acquaintances decide that they must do the same for everyone else and work toward restoring society.

That is easier said than done, as Lena and her group have much standing in their way. The book also follows Lena in her life while she lives in New York City with two other characters from the Wilds: Raven and Tack. She is part of the DFA, the Deliria Free America, and during one of its rallies, she is kidnapped by other Invalids, called Scavengers, and held captive with Julian Fineman, the leader of the youth division of the DFA. Julian is unable to receive the procedure because he has a brain tumor.

With the memory of Alex's sacrifice in mind, she navigates her way out of the place with Julian. Lena slowly begins to fall in love with Julian as he begins to tell more about his abusive father, his real thoughts about the disease, and why he really joined the DFA.

== Reception ==
Critical reception for the novel was mostly positive, with Kirkus Reviews and the School Library Journal giving it starred reviews. The Independent gave a mostly positive review, stating that although Oliver is "an adept and occasionally courageous storyteller", the story was "somewhat exhausting".
