= Lauren Oliver =

American author (born 1982)

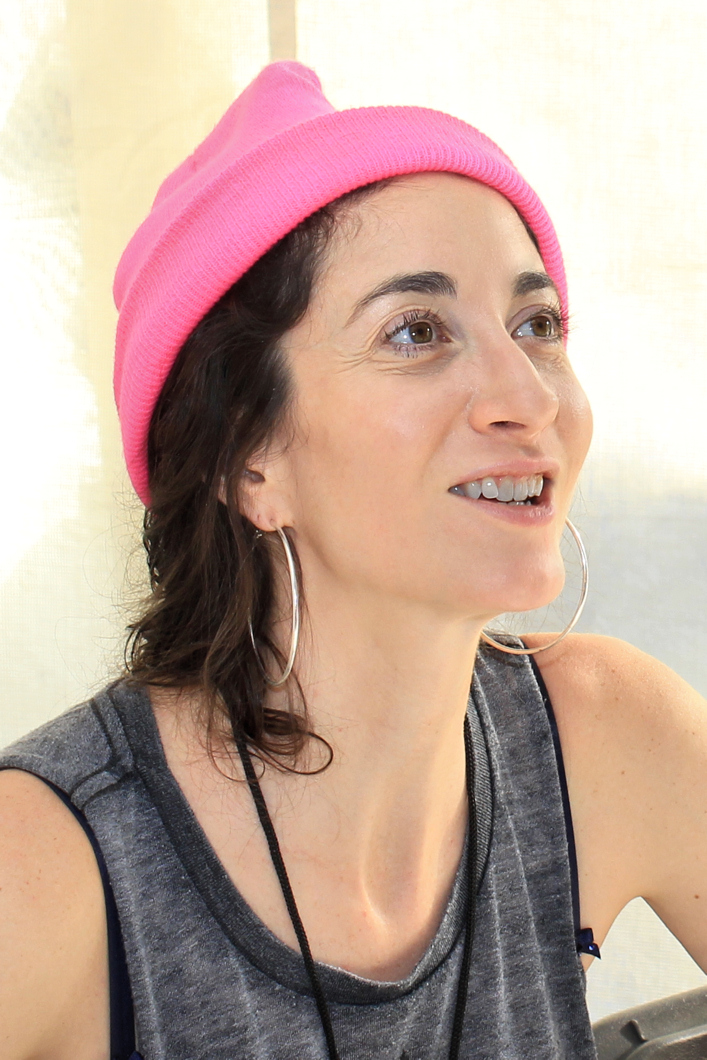
- Oliver at the 2016 Texas Book Festival
- Born: Laura Suzanne Schechter; November 8, 1982 (age 43); Queens, New York City, U.S.
- Occupation: Author
- Father: Harold Schechter
- Writing career
- Education: University of Chicago
- Language: English
- Period: 2010–present
- Genres: Young adult Science fiction Romance; Dystopian; Middle Grade; Adult
- Notable works: Delirium trilogy Before I Fall; Panic
- Website: www.laurenoliverbooks.com

Signature
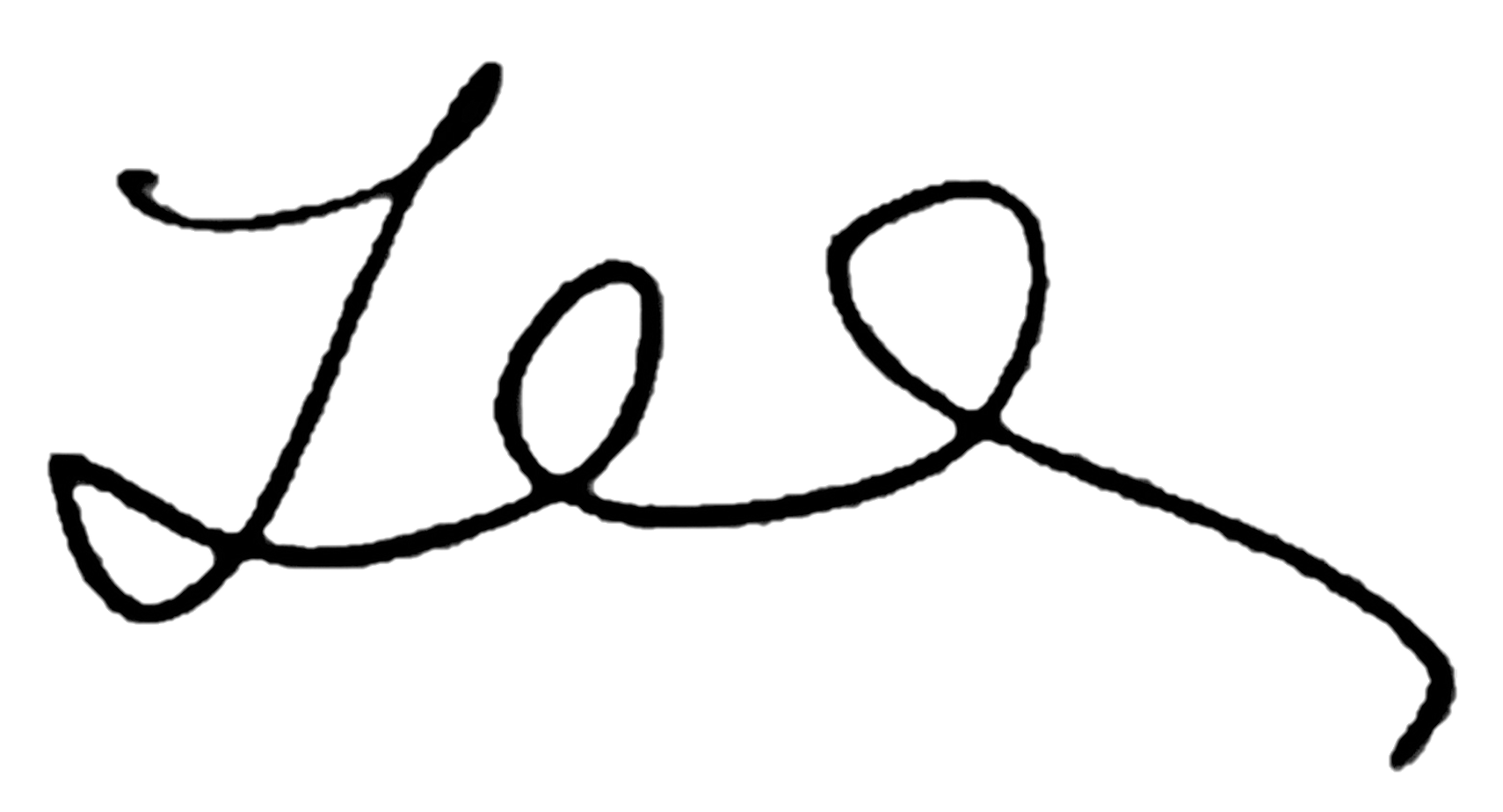

Lauren Oliver (born Laura Suzanne Schechter; November 8, 1982) is an American author of numerous young adult novels including Panic; the Delirium trilogy: Delirium, Pandemonium, and Requiem; and Before I Fall, which became a major motion picture in 2017. Panic was also turned into a series by Amazon studios. She served as creator, writer and showrunner on the project. Her novels have been translated into more than thirty languages internationally. Oliver is a 2012 E. B. White Read Aloud Award nominee for her middle-grade novel Liesl & Po, as well as author of the middle-grade fantasy novel The Spindlers.

Oliver graduated from the University of Chicago, where she was elected to Phi Beta Kappa, and also received a Master of Fine Arts degree from New York University. In 2010, Oliver co-founded Paper Lantern Lit, a literary “incubator”/ development company now called Glasstown Entertainment with Razorbill editor and poet Lexa Hillyer.

== Early life ==
Oliver was born in Queens. She was both an avid reader and writer: "I come from a family of writers, and so have always (mistakenly) believed that spending hours in front of the computer every day, mulling over the difference between 'chortling' and 'chuckling' is normal. As a child, after finishing a book, I would continue to write a sequel for its characters, because I did not want to have to give them up."

As she continued in her writing, Oliver eventually made the switch to writing her own stories and characters, with some success. However, writing was not Oliver's only passion; she also enjoyed taking ballet, drawing, painting, making collages, singing, acting, experimenting with cooking, and (as she put it), "(trying) to spend my time being as creative and useless as possible."

After finishing high school and moving on to the University of Chicago, Oliver revealed, "I continued to be as impractical as possible by majoring in philosophy and literature... inadvertently aided and abetted in my mission by my older sister, Lizzie, who pursued a Ph.D. in philosophy and cognitive science. This eventually led our parents to resign themselves to the fact that their children would never be lawyers, doctors, or even gainfully employed."

== Career and novels ==
Oliver's first book, Before I Fall, was published on March 2, 2010, by HarperCollins in the United States, and by Hodder & Stoughton in the United Kingdom. The book follows Sam, a teenage girl, who has to go through the last day of her life seven times and each time learns new values and the mysteries surrounding her death. Oliver has said that she wrote all of the book on her BlackBerry while she went to meetings on the subway. She would e-mail herself the chapters to later work on them some more.

Open Road Films released the film version in theatres on March 3, 2017, with Zoey Deutch portraying the main character, Samantha Kingston.

Oliver's second book, Delirium, is the first in her dystopian trilogy. Oliver's first novella, Hana, was released after Delirium and shows Hana's perspective on the events of Delirium. The trilogy's second book, Pandemonium, was released on February 28, 2012. Another novella, Annabel, was released on December 26, 2012 as an e-book and has events before those unfolding in Delirium such as details the story of Lena's mother prior to the events.

The third and final book of the trilogy, Requiem, was published on March 5, 2013. A third novella, Raven, was published along with the third book, Requiem, on March 5, 2013 as an e-book and follows Raven on her life and adventures between the events of Pandemonium and Requiem. On March 5, 2013, all three of the novellas (Hana, Annabel, and Raven) were released together in a softcover book.

Oliver's first middle-grade book, about a girl who is visited by a ghost who says her dead father is stuck in Limbo and that only she can help him over, was published on September 1, 2011. Her second middle-grade book, The Spindlers, tells the story of a young girl, Liza, who travels into a fantastical underworld to rescue her younger brother from the sinister creatures. The book was released on August 2, 2012.

Oliver's next book, a young adult contemporary novel Panic, was released March 4, 2014. It tells the stories of Heather and Dodge, who are recently-graduated high school students in the impoverished small town of Carp. The action revolves around the mysterious and dangerous game, "Panic," which takes place every summer after graduation and involves a series of adrenaline pumping challenges that become progressively more life-threatening to weed out the weak and find out who is the most fearless of all. The winner receives a large sum of money (the year that Heather and Dodge play, the prize is $67,000), which is a chance to escape the poverty in which they all live. Panic was adapted into a television series released by Amazon Prime Video; Oliver served as showrunner for the adaptation.

That novel was followed by her first adult novel, Rooms, on September 23, 2014, and another teen novel, Vanishing Girls, on March 10, 2015. Vanishing Girls tells the story of two sisters, Dara and Nick, who deal with the aftermath of a disastrous car accident that has put a strain on their once-inseparable relationship. The book alternates between the perspectives of Dara and Nick until Dara disappears unexpectedly around the same time that a local 9-year old vanishes. Convinced that the two disappearances are connected, Nick decides that she must find out what happened to her sister before it is too late. The book is a psychological thriller that uses regular prose as well as multimedia elements to unfold the mystery.

Oliver's third book for younger readers and the first of a new series was released on September 29, 2015. Curiosity House: The Shrunken Head is a novel written in collaboration with H.C. Chester.

Oliver's next young adult book, Replica, follows the story of two girls, Gemma and Lyra and asks the reader to read the same story but from two different perspectives.

Oliver's fourth and fifth books for younger readers were Curiosity House: The Screaming Statue and Curiosity House: The Fearsome Firebird, the second and the third of the Curiosity House series.

In 2019, she became the president of Glasstown West, the company's film and TV division, and she simultaneously began work on Hookline, an aggregate platform of social AR iconography.

With Lexa Hillyer, she has authored and developed more than one hundred original books and TV/film scripts.

== Personal life ==
Oliver was born in Queens and raised in Westchester, New York, a small town very similar to the one depicted in Before I Fall. She is the daughter of the true crime writer Harold Schechter. Her parents are both literature professors, and from a very young age, she was encouraged to make up stories, draw, paint, dance around in costumes, and spend much of her time essentially living imaginatively.

Her love of writing began with writing imaginative sequels to her favorite stories before she gradually wrote her own. She pursued literature and philosophy at the University of Chicago and then moved back to New York to attend NYU’s MFA program in creative writing.

She simultaneously began working at Penguin Books, in a young adult division called Razorbill, where she started work on Before I Fall. She left in 2009 to pursue writing full-time and now happily works at home.

Oliver lives in Los Angeles, California.

== Publications ==
=== Novels for young adults ===
==== Delirium Trilogy ====
- Delirium (February 3, 2011)
- Pandemonium (February 28, 2012)
- Requiem (March 5, 2013)

===== Companion books to Delirium Trilogy =====
- Annabel (December 26, 2012) – Novella #0.5
- Hana (February 28, 2011) – Novella #1.5
- Raven (March 5, 2013) – Novella #2.5
- Alex (November 25, 2014) – Novella #1.1
- Delirium Stories: Hana, Annabel, and Raven (March 5, 2013) – Anthologie
- Delirium Stories: Hana, Annabel, Raven, and Alex (May 17, 2016) – Anthologie
- The Book of Shhh (May 17, 2016) – ebook Companion

==== Standalone novels ====
- Before I Fall (March 2, 2010)
- Panic (March 4, 2014)
- Vanishing Girls (March 10, 2015)
- Broken Things (October 2, 2018)

==== Replica Duology ====
- Replica (October 4, 2016)
- Ringer (October 3, 2017)

=== Novels for adults ===
- Rooms (September 23, 2014)

=== Novels for young readers ===
- Liesl and Po (October 4, 2011)
- The Spindlers (October 2, 2012)
- Curiosity House: The Shrunken Head (September 29, 2015)
- Curiosity House: The Screaming Statue (May 3, 2016)
- Curiosity House: The Fearsome Firebird (April 11, 2017)
- The Magnificent Monsters of Cedar Street (February 11, 2020)
