= Riverdale (American TV series) =

American teen drama television series (2017–2023)

- Also known as: Rivervale (Note: The first half of season 6 is titled Rivervale as it takes place in an alternative version of Riverdale, named "Rivervale".)
- Genre: Teen drama; Soap opera; Mystery; Absurdism
- Based on: Characters by Archie Comics
- Developed by: Roberto Aguirre-Sacasa
- Showrunner: Roberto Aguirre-Sacasa
- Starring: KJ Apa; Lili Reinhart; Camila Mendes; Cole Sprouse; Madelaine Petsch; Marisol Nichols; Ashleigh Murray; Mädchen Amick; Luke Perry; Mark Consuelos; Casey Cott; Skeet Ulrich; Charles Melton; Vanessa Morgan; Drew Ray Tanner; Erinn Westbrook
- Narrated by: Cole Sprouse
- Composers: Blake Neely; Sherri Chung
- Country of origin: United States
- Original language: English
- No. of seasons: 7
- No. of episodes: 137 (list of episodes)

Production
- Executive producers: Jon Goldwater; Sarah Schechter; Greg Berlanti; Roberto Aguirre-Sacasa; Michael Grassi
- Producer: J. B. Moranville
- Production locations: Vancouver, British Columbia
- Cinematography: David Lanzenberg (pilot); Stephen Jackson; Brendan Michael Uegama; Ronald Paul Richard; Shamus Whiting-Hewlett; Bernard Couture; James Liston; Mark Berlet
- Editors: Paul Karasick; Harry Jierjian; Marvin Matyka; Dan Holland; Adam Reich; Elizabeth Czyzewski
- Camera setup: Single-camera
- Running time: 41–50 minutes
- Production companies: Berlanti Productions; Archie Comics; CBS Studios (Note: Credited as CBS Television Studios for seasons 1–4); Warner Bros. Television

Original release
- Network: The CW
- Release: January 26, 2017 – August 23, 2023

Related
- Chilling Adventures of Sabrina; Katy Keene

Riverdale is an American television series based on the characters of Archie Comics. The series was adapted for the CW Network by Archie Comics' chief creative officer Roberto Aguirre-Sacasa. It is produced by Warner Bros. Television and CBS Studios, in association with Berlanti Productions and Archie Comics.

First conceived as a feature film adaptation for Warner Bros. Pictures, the project was re-imagined as a television series for Fox. In 2015, development on the project moved to The CW, where the series was ordered for a pilot. Filming took place in Vancouver, British Columbia.

The series featured an ensemble cast based on the characters of Archie Comics, with KJ Apa in the role of Archie Andrews, Lili Reinhart as Betty Cooper, Camila Mendes as Veronica Lodge, and Cole Sprouse as Jughead Jones, the series' narrator. After a teenager is murdered within the town of Riverdale, a group of teenagers try to unravel the evils lurking within the town.

Riverdale premiered on January 26, 2017, to positive reviews throughout its first few seasons, while the later seasons were criticized for the writing, direction, lack of coherent storylines and a perceived decline in quality. The series ran for seven seasons until August 23, 2023.

== Cast and characters ==
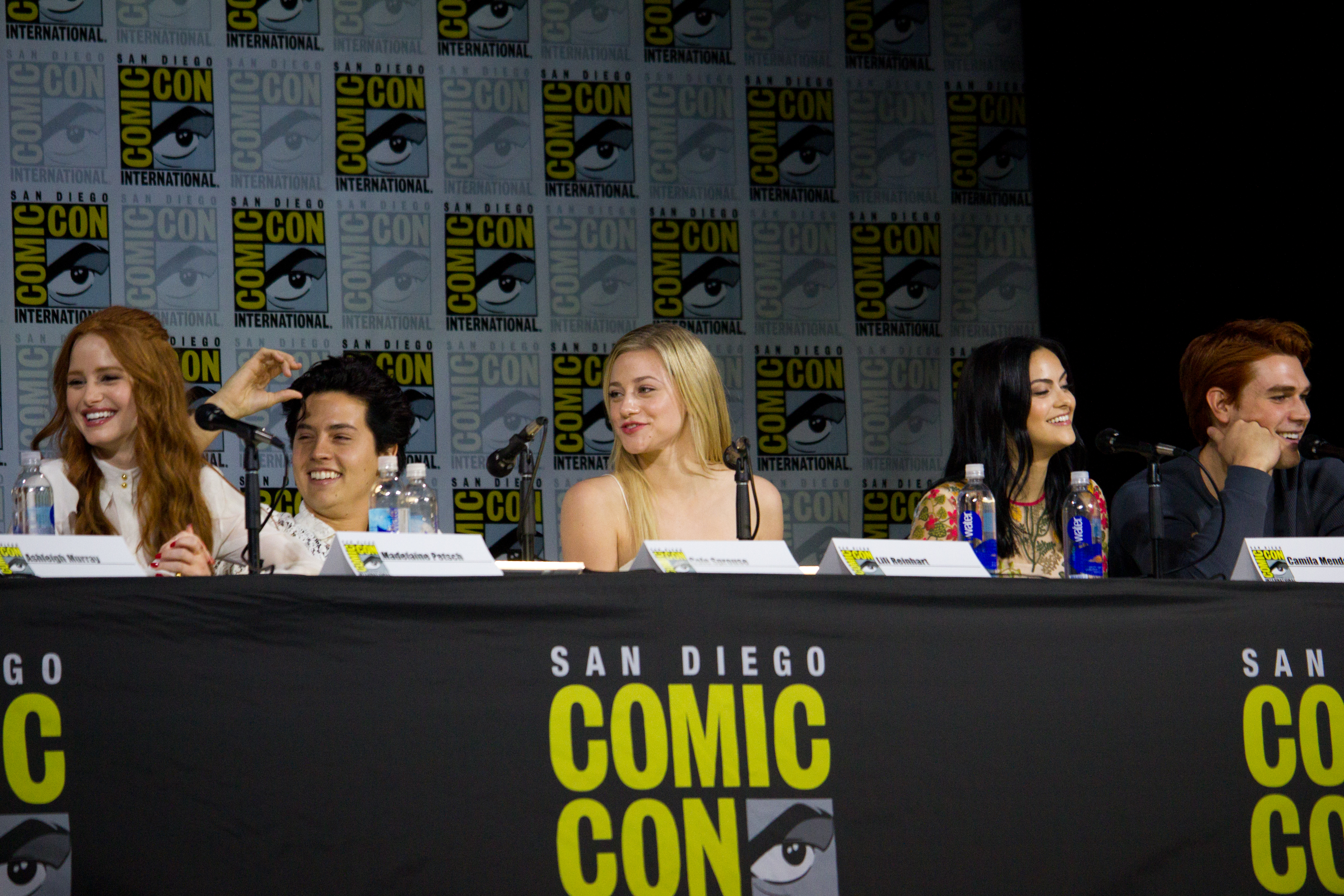
Madelaine Petsch, Cole Sprouse, Lili Reinhart, Camila Mendes, and KJ Apa at the Riverdale panel at 2017 San Diego Comic-Con

- KJ Apa as Archie Andrews: A former high school football player who has a passion for music. After graduating, he fought as an Army sergeant and is now a JROTC instructor at his old high school. He is deeply involved in protecting his community from any danger. He is childhood best friends with his next door neighbor, Betty Cooper, and best friends with Jughead Jones. He once dated Veronica Lodge in high school, but they broke up. He later begins a relationship with Betty, to whom he proposes in the season six finale. He also becomes invulnerable after surviving a bomb explosion. In season seven in the 1950s, he discovers a passion for poetry he settles down in Modesto, as a construction worker and amateur writer, where he meets a girl and starts a family with her. When he dies, he is buried in Riverdale next to his father.
- Lili Reinhart as Betty Cooper: A smart woman who is best friends with Archie, who she has a longtime crush on. She becomes friends with Veronica Lodge when she moves to town. In high school, she dates Jughead, with whom she runs the school paper. She breaks up with Jughead before going away to college. She becomes an FBI agent and operates from Riverdale. She gradually develops a relationship with Archie and becomes engaged to him in the season 6 finale. In the 1950s in season 7, after exploring her sexuality and finding her independence, she settles in New York, where she runs her own women's magazine and adopts her daughter, Carla.
- Camila Mendes as Veronica Lodge: A former "it girl" of Manhattan, she moves to Riverdale at the beginning of the series. She hopes to become a better person after reflecting on the turmoil in her life after her father is convicted and sent to prison. She is ambitious and wants to succeed, but also works to be humble and avoid trouble. She dates Archie and later Reggie in high school. In season five, she is revealed to have had an extremely successful career on Wall Street, which she had to give up because of a marriage to an abusive husband. Later she divorces and kills him. She briefly reunites with Archie but it ends quickly and she starts seeing Reggie again, though they eventually break up too. In season 6, she orders a hit on her father and later gains the power to generate poison. In the 1950s Veronica discovers a love for movies and after running the local theater, she moves to Hollywood, becomes a successful producer, and is even buried in the Hollywood Forever Cemetery after she dies.
- Cole Sprouse as Jughead Jones: A philosophically inclined social outcast who is Archie's best friend and Betty's ex-boyfriend. He was the former leader of the Southside Serpents gang. He went on to become a published writer, English teacher, and an advisor at the Blue and Gold high school newspaper. He struggled with alcoholism but eventually got sober and started dating Tabitha Tate. In season 6, he developed the power to read minds and was key to defeating Percival Pickens. In the 1950s, he briefly dates Veronica while developing a passion for comic books, and goes on to create his company called Jughead's Mad House. Sprouse also portrays Narrator Jughead, who prevents the Riverdale and Rivervale timelines from merging.
- Marisol Nichols as Hermione Lodge (seasons 1–5; guest, seasons 6–7): Veronica's mother, who returned to Riverdale with her daughter following the incarceration of her husband Hiram Lodge. She is now a reality star on Real Housewives of New York after leaving Hiram. She had feelings for Fred as a teenager and again when she returned to Riverdale.
- Madelaine Petsch as Cheryl Blossom: A wealthy, traumatized, and sometimes manipulative woman who was a classmate of Archie and his friends. She grew up in an abusive and controlling family all while dealing with the murder of her brother, Jason Blossom. She comes out as a lesbian in the second season, dates Toni throughout the rest of high school, until they broke up after graduation because of Toni's disapproving family. She forgoes college to stay in Riverdale and atone for her family's sins by turning their business around. In Season 6, she reconnects with her childhood crush Heather, who helps her develop her fire power and discover she's a witch, but they break up when Heather discovers Toni is Cheryl's soulmate. In season 7, she reunites with Toni in the 1950s, and they move to California, where they have a son named Dale. Cheryl becomes a successful painter and eventually dies of old age after living a happy life.
- Ashleigh Murray as Josie McCoy (seasons 1–4; guest, seasons 5 and 7): The lead singer of Josie and the Pussycats and a former classmate of Archie, whom she briefly dates, and his friends. She leaves at the end of season 3 to pursue her music, though she briefly returns in the season 4 premiere for Archie's father's funeral; this allowed Murray's character to join Katy Keene, the third spin off in the Riverdale universe. She is now a multi-platinum superstar. In Season 7, she is a successful musician and actor.
- Mädchen Amick as Alice Cooper (née Smith): Betty and Polly's mother, who was the editor of the local paper. She is now a reporter for the Riverdale news and is raising Polly's twin children following Polly's murder in season 5, she is also shown to be less abusive having redeemed herself. Prior to his leaving in season 5, she was in a relationship with FP Jones. In season 6, she is brainwashed by Percival Pickens to do his bidding, and in Season 7, she is very controlling of Betty, but eventually learns to let go. She became a stewardess, where she met a man on a flight and ended up marrying him and travelling the world.
- Luke Perry as Fred Andrews (seasons 1–3): Archie's father, who owned a construction company. He was in love with Veronica's mother as a teenager and briefly reunites with her when she returns to Riverdale. He dies at the start of season 4 in a car accident due to Perry's real life death.
- Mark Consuelos as Hiram Lodge (born Jaime Luna) (seasons 2–5; guest, seasons 6–7): Veronica's father, who was recently incarcerated for illegal activities. In season 2 he moves to Riverdale, continuing his illegal activities and gangster ways. He was later killed in season 6 when Veronica ordered a hit on him.
- Casey Cott as Kevin Keller (seasons 2–7; recurring season 1): An openly gay former Riverdale high school student who is friends with Archie, Betty, Veronica and Jughead and is the son of Riverdale's sheriff. He returns to Riverdale becoming a teacher after not making it in Broadway in New York and abandons the son he planned to have with Toni and Fangs. He later files for sole custody over baby Anthony eventually giving this up to create peace. He reunites with his high school boyfriend Moose in season 6, but in Season 7, he meets Clay Walker in the 1950s and falls in love with him. They move to New York, where Kevin starts an off-Broadway theater company, and spend their life together before they died of old age.
- Skeet Ulrich as F. P. Jones (seasons 2–5; recurring season 1): Jughead's formerly estranged father and the former leader of the Southside Serpents, a gang of criminals that live and operate on the fringes of Riverdale. He was once the sheriff but left Riverdale to take Jughead's sister Jellybean back to Toledo to her mother. Prior to his leaving, he was in a relationship with Alice Cooper.
- Charles Melton as Reggie Mantle (seasons 3–7; recurring season 2): Archie's long-time friend and rival, a former football player at Riverdale High and town prankster who has dyslexia. He is now the owner of his family's car dealership and the high school football coach as well as Veronica's boyfriend. Reggie was originally played by Ross Butler in the first season, who left the series due to his commitments to filming 13 Reasons Why. Butler returned as a version of Reggie from an alternate universe in "Chapter One Hundred: The Jughead Paradox" from season six. Reggie and Veronica break up in season 6 following the opening of their casino. In the season 6 finale he takes sole ownership of the casino. In the 1950s, Reggie grew up on a farm and has a passion for basketball. He has a crush on Betty but it does not go anywhere. After high school, he went on to play for the Lakers, then returned to coach Riverdale's high school basketball team. He had a wife and two sons.

- Vanessa Morgan as Toni Topaz (seasons 3–7; recurring season 2): A bisexual member of the Southside Serpents, who becomes friends with Jughead when he starts Southside High in season 2. She dated Cheryl throughout high school, but they broke up after graduation. She went to High Smith College and got a social work degree, which she used to become the guidance counselor at Riverdale High. She went on to become the leader of the Serpents, and was the surrogate mother for Kevin and Fangs, but later started dating Fangs after they broke up. She spent Season 6 tied up in a custody case for their son Anthony, which resulted in her marrying Fangs. In season 7, she was a vocal activist and aspiring photographer. She reunited with Cheryl, and spent the rest of her life with her out in California, where they raised their son, Dale, and continued their activism.
- Drew Ray Tanner as Fangs Fogarty (seasons 5–7; recurring season 2–4): a member of the Southside Serpents and Kevin's former on-and-off again boyfriend. After breaking up with Kevin, he develops a relationship with Toni and they get married to strengthen their side of the custody battle for the son the three of them planned to have together in Season 6. However, in Season 7, he only has eyes for Midge, getting her pregnant and trying to kickstart a music career to win her parents' approval to marry her. They marry and have a daughter, but he dies young just as his music career is starting to take off.
- Erinn Westbrook as Tabitha Tate (seasons 5–7x01, special guest 7x08 onwards): Pop Tate's granddaughter, who moves to Riverdale to take over the family diner after Pop retires. She befriends Jughead and supports him on his sobriety journey, and they eventually begin dating. In season 6, she develops time travelling powers and learns she's Riverdale's Guardian Angel. She uses the last of her life and powers to send everyone back to the 1950s for the final season, while she tries to untangle and fix all the timelines. She returns to give everyone back their memories, but is unable to return them back to the present and cannot stay with them. Her 1950s counterpart moves back to Chicago, where she goes to business and law school, and becomes a civil rights advocate.

== Episodes ==
Season	Episodes	Originally released		Rank	Average viewers (in millions)
Season	Episodes	First released	Last released	Rank	Average viewers (in millions)
1	13	January 26, 2017	May 11, 2017	154	1.69
2	22	October 11, 2017	May 16, 2018	173	2.12
3	22	October 10, 2018	May 15, 2019	166	1.74
4	19	October 9, 2019	May 6, 2020	122	1.35
5	19	January 20, 2021	October 6, 2021	145	1.01
6	22	November 16, 2021	July 31, 2022	133	0.46
7	20	March 29, 2023	August 23, 2023	129	0.39

== Production ==
=== Development ===
Warner Bros. began development on an Archie feature film in 2013, after a pitch from writer Roberto Aguirre-Sacasa and director Jason Moore that would have placed Archie's gang into a teen comedy feature film in the John Hughes tradition. The duo brought the project to Warner Bros., where a VP recommended a more high-concept direction involving time travel or interdimensional portals, suggesting Louis C. K. to portray an older Archie. Dan Lin and Roy Lee became producers on the project, which eventually stalled as priorities shifted at the studio towards larger tentpole films, and was reimagined as a television series. The series Riverdale was in development at Fox, with the network landing the project in 2014 with a script deal plus penalty. However, Fox did not go forward with the project. In 2015, the show's development was moved to the CW, which officially ordered a pilot on January 29, 2016. On March 7, 2017, The CW announced that the series had been renewed for a second season. On April 2, 2018, The CW renewed the series for a third season, which premiered October 10, 2018. On January 31, 2019, The CW renewed the series for a fourth season, that was planned to consist of 22 episodes. However, season four got shortened to 19 episodes instead because production was suspended on March 11, 2020, as a direct result of the coronavirus pandemic. Only 19 of the 22 ordered episodes of the fourth season were completed before the coronavirus pandemic. The fourth season premiered on October 9, 2019.

"Chapter Forty-Nine: Fire Walk with Me" was the first to be dedicated to Luke Perry, who died two days before the episode aired.

On January 7, 2020, the series was renewed for a fifth season, which began a year later on January 20, 2021.

On February 3, 2021, the series was renewed for a sixth season which was split into two parts, and it premiered on November 16, 2021. On March 22, 2022, The CW renewed the series for a seventh season. On May 19, 2022, it was announced that the series will be concluding with its upcoming seventh season, which premiered on March 29, 2023. The series finale aired on August 23, 2023.

=== Casting ===
On February 9, 2016, Lili Reinhart and Cole Sprouse were cast as Betty Cooper and Jughead Jones, respectively. Reinhart was initially passed over for the role after submitting a self-taped audition, but attended an in-person casting in Los Angeles where she won the role. On February 24, 2016, KJ Apa was cast as Archie Andrews after a four-month worldwide talent search. Apa was one of the last to audition and landed the role just days later. Also that day, Ashleigh Murray was cast as Josie McCoy, the lead singer for the popular band Josie and the Pussycats, and Luke Perry and Madelaine Petsch were also added as Fred Andrews, Archie's father, and Cheryl Blossom, respectively. Two days later, Camila Mendes was cast as Veronica Lodge marking her first acting role in a television show.

In March 2016, Marisol Nichols and Mädchen Amick joined the cast as Hermione Lodge and Alice Cooper, Veronica and Betty's mothers, respectively. A few days later, Ross Butler, Daniel Yang and Cody Kearsley were cast in the roles Reggie Mantle, Dilton Doiley and Moose Mason, respectively. The last actor to join the pilot was Casey Cott as Kevin Keller, the first openly gay character in Archie Comics history.

In April 2017, Mark Consuelos signed on for the second season to play Veronica Lodge's father, Hiram Lodge. The role was in second position to his existing role on Pitch, but the cancellation of that series was announced on May 1, 2017. The next month, Charles Melton was cast to take over the role of Reggie from Ross Butler in season 2, due to his status as a series regular on 13 Reasons Why. Casey Cott, who played Kevin Keller, was promoted to a series regular. In July 2017, True Blood star Brit Morgan was cast in the recurring role of Penny Peabody, an attorney the Southside Serpents call in case of any run-ins with the law. In August 2017, Graham Phillips had been cast to play Nick St. Clair, Veronica's ex-boyfriend from New York.

In March 2018, Andy Cohen appeared in the sixteenth episode of the second season as himself. In the series, he and Hermione are friends. He previously offered her a role as a cast member on The Real Housewives of New York City; however, Hermione turned down the offer to keep things private for the Lodge family. In May 2018, Charles Melton and Vanessa Morgan, who play Reggie Mantle and Toni Topaz, respectively, would both be promoted to series regulars in the third season. By the time of New York Comic Con 2018, Gina Gershon and Trinity Likins, respectively, had been cast as Gladys Jones and Jellybean "J. B." Jones for the third season.

In November 2018, Kelly Ripa, the wife of Mark Consuelos, who portrays Hiram Lodge, was cast for a guest role as Hiram's mistress. Michael Consuelos, Kelly and Mark's son, was cast to make a guest appearance in a flashback episode as a younger Hiram. In October 2019, Ryan Robbins was cast as Fred Andrews's older brother, Frank Andrews, who appeared during the fourth season.

On February 23, 2020, it was announced that both Ulrich and Nichols would be leaving the series. However, in June 2020, Nichols revealed that after having a long talk with showrunner Sacasa, she would be staying on for season five. In September 2020, it was announced that Erinn Westbrook would join the show as a new regular character named Tabitha Tate, the granddaughter of Pop Tate, who arrives in town to run her grandfather's malt shop and franchise from it. In January 2021, Chris Mason was cast in a recurring role for the fifth season as Chad Gekko, Veronica's Wall Street husband. In December 2021, Chris O'Shea joined the cast in a recurring role as Percival Pickens for the sixth season. In May 2022, Caroline Day joined the cast in a recurring role as Heather for the sixth season. On December 20, 2022, Nicholas Barasch and Karl Walcott were cast in recurring capacities for the seventh season.

=== Filming ===
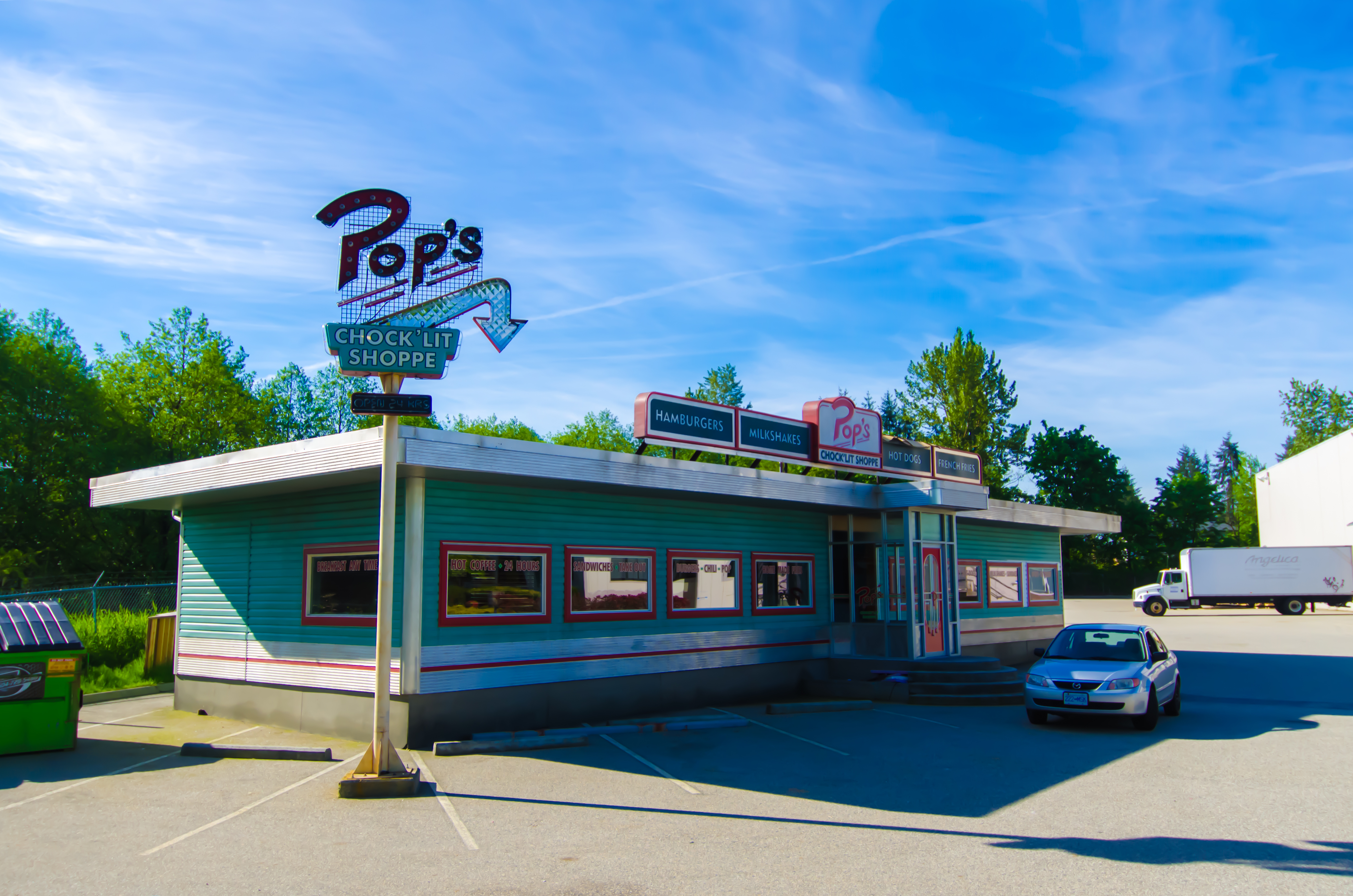
The Pop's Chock'lit Shoppe set in Vancouver, Canada

Filming of the pilot began on March 14, 2016, and ended on March 31 in Vancouver, British Columbia. Production on the remaining 12 episodes of season one began on September 7, 2016, in Vancouver. Sets included Pop Tate's Chock'lit Shoppe, a copy of the functioning diner used in the pilot that is so realistic a truck driver parked his 18-wheeler there, believing that it was open. Season two was also filmed in Vancouver and the nearby Fraser Valley. The aerial view of Riverdale is actually drawn from stock footage used in the series Pretty Little Liars and Gilmore Girls, and the landmark settings are the same used in both of the aforementioned series as well as in Hart of Dixie. Filming for the second season started on June 22, 2017, and concluded on March 27, 2018. Filming for the third season started on July 6, 2018.

Filming for the fourth season began on July 8, 2019, and was originally expected to end on April 4, 2020. Production was suspended on March 11, 2020, as a direct result of the coronavirus pandemic, after a person working on the show came in contact with a person who tested positive for COVID-19. Only nineteen of the twenty-two ordered episodes of the fourth season were completed. Series writer Brian E. Paterson later confirmed that they would shoot the remaining two episodes of season four when it was safe to do so. The fourth season ultimately concluded with episode nineteen. The remaining three episodes intended for the season were used for the start of the fifth season, before the series underwent a five-year time jump. Despite a later premiere, season five was not expected to have a shortened episode count.

Filming for the fifth season began on September 14, 2020. The following month, however, filming was suspended for a week due to COVID-19 testing delays. Production on season five wrapped-up on June 1, 2021. The sixth season commenced production on August 30, 2021, and concluded on June 16, 2022. Filming for the seventh and final season began on October 17, 2022, and concluded on June 25, 2023.

Homages to other films and television shows

Several reviewers have noted that the series' episode titles are often taken directly or slightly altered from the titles of older films. For example, De Elizabeth of Teen Vogue points out that Riverdale's pilot episode was named "River's Edge" after the 1986 film of the same name, and the season finale takes its name from 1997's The Sweet Hereafter. Executive producer Roberto Aguirre-Sacasa notes that this is a deliberate choice, in order to hint at what will happen in that episode. References to the fictional setting of the Black Mirror episode "San Junipero" can be seen in season one as well as heard amongst dialogue in season two and three.

Additionally, Katie-Kouise Smith of Popbuzz notes that the opening credits for Riverdale mirror those of the Twin Peaks television series, and are intended as an homage to that series' co-creator, David Lynch.

== Music ==
Musical performances are featured throughout the series, a blend of cover versions and originals. Songs performed in episodes are released as digital singles after broadcast; WaterTower Music released a digital compilation for season 1 songs on May 12, 2017; season 2 on May 18, 2018; season 3 on May 17, 2019; season 4 on May 15, 2020; and season 5 on August 25, 2021.

An album of Blake Neely's scoring for season 1 was released on compact disc by La-La Land Records, and simultaneously on download by WaterTower, on July 18, 2017. The season 2 album with scores from Neely and Sherri Chung was released on CD by La-La Land on October 30, 2018 and on digital by WaterTower on November 16, 2018. A Halloween episode score soundtrack was released on digital on October 31, 2019. The scoring for seasons 3 and 4 were released on separate digital albums on January 22, 2021.

WaterTower released the songs performed in the musical episodes on separate digital albums. The Carrie: The Musical soundtrack was released on April 19, 2018, followed by a vinyl edition released at Urban Outfitters stores on July 13. The Heathers: The Musical soundtrack was released March 21, 2019; the Hedwig and the Angry Inch soundtrack was released on April 15, 2020. The Return of the Pussycats soundtrack, and the Next to Normal soundtrack, were both released on September 8 and 30, 2021, respectively. The American Psycho: The Musical soundtrack was released on June 12, 2022, and the Archie the Musical soundtrack was released on July 5, 2023, respectively.

=== Season 2 ===
Riverdale: Season 2 (Original Television Soundtrack)
No.	Title	Artist(s)	Length
1.	"Milkshake"	Ashleigh Murray, Asha Bromfield and Madelaine Petsch	2:56
2.	"Out Tonight"	Ashleigh Murray, Asha Bromfield, Hayley Law and Camila Mendes	3:47
3.	"Spooky"	Ashleigh Murray	2:40
4.	"Mad World"	KJ Apa, Camila Mendes and Lili Reinhart	3:08
5.	"God Rest You Merry, Gentlemen"	Ashleigh Murray and Casey Cott	2:10
6.	"Union of the Snake"	Camila Mendes, Asha Bromfield and Hayley Law	2:43
7.	"Bitter Sweet Symphony"	Ashleigh Murray and Camila Mendes	4:05
8.	"Sufferin' Till Suffrage"	Ashleigh Murray and Camila Mendes	1:42
9.	"You'll Never Walk Alone"	Madelaine Petsch	1:50

Riverdale: Season 2 (Original Television Score)
No.	Title	Artist(s)	Length
1.	"I Froze - The Black Hood"	Blake Neely and Sherri Chung	3:14
2.	"Code Breaking - Lodge Scheming"	Blake Neely and Sherri Chung	3:06
3.	"Forming the Red Circle"	Blake Neely and Sherri Chung	2:27
4.	"Make Good Decisions"	Blake Neely and Sherri Chung	1:50
5.	"Asking Leniency"	Blake Neely and Sherri Chung	1:41
6.	"Cheryl Committed"	Blake Neely and Sherri Chung	2:24
7.	"I Was in Love Once"	Blake Neely and Sherri Chung	2:22
8.	"Not a Killer"	Blake Neely and Sherri Chung	2:26
9.	"Sent to the Southside"	Blake Neely and Sherri Chung	3:40
10.	"Challenging the Ghoulies"	Blake Neely and Sherri Chung	3:10
11.	"Like Romeo and Juliet"	Blake Neely and Sherri Chung	2:32
12.	"Defeating the Black Hood"	Blake Neely and Sherri Chung	1:56
13.	"Won't Let It Go"	Blake Neely and Sherri Chung	1:41
14.	"Less Pony, More Snake - You Broke My Heart"	Blake Neely and Sherri Chung	2:16
15.	"Dangerous Game"	Blake Neely and Sherri Chung	3:04
16.	"Double Breakup"	Blake Neely and Sherri Chung	2:30
17.	"Quiet the Darkness Inside"	Blake Neely and Sherri Chung	2:49
18.	"Everything Falls Apart"	Blake Neely and Sherri Chung	2:28
19.	"Or You Could Stay"	Blake Neely and Sherri Chung	3:11
20.	"Darkness Begins to Fall"	Blake Neely and Sherri Chung	2:54
21.	"Truth About Being Mayor"	Blake Neely and Sherri Chung	2:45
22.	"The Cabin"	Blake Neely and Sherri Chung	2:14
23.	"Challenging Hiram"	Blake Neely and Sherri Chung	1:19
24.	"Just When You Felt Safe"	Blake Neely and Sherri Chung	3:14
25.	"Archie Held Captive"	Blake Neely and Sherri Chung	2:16
26.	"Conclusions"	Blake Neely and Sherri Chung	2:41
27.	"New Serpent King"	Blake Neely and Sherri Chung	2:14
28.	"I'll Never Be Like You"	Blake Neely and Sherri Chung	1:49
29.	"A Better Tomorrow"	Blake Neely and Sherri Chung	3:23
30.	"Hiram's Master Plan"	Blake Neely and Sherri Chung	3:39
31.	"Foolish Question"	Blake Neely and Sherri Chung	2:14

=== Season 3 ===
Riverdale: Season 3 (Original Television Soundtrack)
No.	Title	Artist(s)	Length
1.	"Jailhouse Rock"	Ashleigh Murray, Madelaine Petsch and Camila Mendes	2:28
2.	"Anything Goes"	Ashleigh Murray	3:53
3.	"Another Hundred People"	Ashleigh Murray	2:12
4.	"Dream Warriors"	KJ Apa, Ashleigh Murray, Camila Mendes and Lili Reinhart	3:04
5.	"Cabaret"	Ashleigh Murray	3:20
6.	"Maybe This Time"	Camila Mendes	2:46
7.	"Eres tú"	Camila Mendes	2:50
8.	"Sooner or Later"	Ashleigh Murray	3:19
9.	"People Like Us"	Ashleigh Murray and KJ Apa	3:44
10.	"We Don't Need Another Hero"	Ashleigh Murray	3:12
11.	"Don't Let Me Be Misunderstood"	Gina Gershon	2:06
12.	"Call Your Girlfriend"	Camila Mendes and Vanessa Morgan	3:48
13.	"Back to Black"	Ashleigh Murray	4:02
14.	"Daddy Lessons"	Camila Mendes	3:50

Riverdale: Season 3 (Score from the Original Television Soundtrack)
No.	Title	Artist(s)	Length
1.	"How the Summer Passed"	Blake Neely and Sherri Chung	5:35
2.	"Prison and Fire Babies"	Blake Neely and Sherri Chung	4:38
3.	"The Farm and the Warden"	Blake Neely and Sherri Chung	4:56
4.	"The Midnight Club"	Blake Neely and Sherri Chung	3:21
5.	"Prison Games and the Red Paladin"	Blake Neely and Sherri Chung	6:02
6.	"The Pact"	Blake Neely and Sherri Chung	3:52
7.	"Goodbye, Ronnie"	Blake Neely and Sherri Chung	3:37
8.	"Under Quarantine / Archie Returns"	Blake Neely and Sherri Chung	6:16
9.	"Unmasking the Gargoyle King"	Blake Neely and Sherri Chung	3:37
10.	"The Red Dahlia"	Blake Neely and Sherri Chung	5:35
11.	"Secrets and Games"	Blake Neely and Sherri Chung	6:14
12.	"Final Trials"	Blake Neely and Sherri Chung	6:58
13.	"Betty Goes After the Gargoyle King"	Blake Neely and Sherri Chung	5:22
14.	"Confronting Psychopaths"	Blake Neely and Sherri Chung	5:27
15.	"Naked and Afraid"	Blake Neely and Sherri Chung	2:22

=== Season 4 ===
Riverdale: Season 4 (Original Television Soundtrack)
No.	Title	Artist(s)	Length
1.	"Amazing Grace"	Ashleigh Murray	3:23
2.	"All That Jazz"	Camila Mendes, Madelaine Petsch and Vanessa Morgan	3:21
3.	"Saturday Night's Alright (For Fighting)"	Camila Mendes and Casey Cott	2:27
4.	"Cherry Bomb"	Madelaine Petsch, Camila Mendes and Vanessa Morgan	1:58
5.	"Carry the Torch"	KJ Apa	1:51

Riverdale: Season 4 (Score from the Original Television Soundtrack)
No.	Title	Artist(s)	Length
1.	"Dad Is Gone"	Blake Neely and Sherri Chung	5:55
2.	"Bringing Fred Home"	Blake Neely and Sherri Chung	4:21
3.	"Fast Times at Riverdale High"	Blake Neely and Sherri Chung	5:27
4.	"Dog Day Afternoon"	Blake Neely and Sherri Chung	5:30
5.	"Hereditary, Riverdale Style"	Blake Neely and Sherri Chung	5:12
6.	"New Conspiracy Theory"	Blake Neely and Sherri Chung	4:56
7.	"The Ice Storm"	Blake Neely and Sherri Chung	4:32
8.	"In Treatment"	Blake Neely and Sherri Chung	6:25
9.	"Quill and Scroll"	Blake Neely and Sherri Chung	6:07
10.	"The Ides of March"	Blake Neely and Sherri Chung	4:56
11.	"This Is Nice"	Blake Neely and Sherri Chung	4:56
12.	"Into the Lion Den"	Blake Neely and Sherri Chung	4:38
13.	"The Death of Jughead Jones"	Blake Neely and Sherri Chung	4:37
14.	"Jughead Funeral / Betty Threat"	Blake Neely and Sherri Chung	5:21
15.	"Tangerine and Honey"	Blake Neely and Sherri Chung	3:41

=== Season 5 ===
Riverdale: Season 5 (Original Television Soundtrack)
No.	Title	Artist(s)	Length
1.	"Carry the Torch"	Camila Mendes	1:46
2.	"Good Riddance"	K. J. Apa	2:36
3.	"After Dark"	Vanessa Morgan & Drew Ray Tanner	2:47
4.	"Shallow"	Camila Mendes & Chris Mason	3:18
5.	"Stupid Love"	Madelaine Petsch	3:16
6.	"Walking in Space"	Lili Reinhart, Madelaine Petsch, Nathalie Boltt & Erin Westbrook	3:38
7.	"Nothin' but a Good Time"	Camila Mendes, Erin Westbrook, Lili Reinhart, Madelaine Petsch & Mädchen Amick	2:43
8.	"Everything's Alright"	Casey Cott & Madelaine Petsch	3:32

Riverdale: Special Episode – The Return of the Pussycats (Original Television Soundtrack)
No.	Title	Performer(s)	Length
1.	"It's All Coming Back to Me"	Ashleigh Murray, Hayley Law and Asha Bromfield	3:34
2.	"It's Gonna Rain"	Ajay Musodi, Ashleigh Murray, Diandra Lee, Eduardo Vasquez, James Ross, Kyra Leroux and Quincy Pipella	1:54
3.	"Physical"	Asha Bromfield and Hayley Law	3:14
4.	"Little Shop of Horrors"	Vanessa Morgan, Erinn Westbrook and Camille Hyde	2:24
5.	"Josie and the Pussycats"	Ashleigh Murray, Hayley Law and Asha Bromfield	0:40
6.	"Get Up"	Ashleigh Murray, Hayley Law and Asha Bromfield	2:49
7.	"Stars"	Ashleigh Murray	3:18

Riverdale: Special Episode – Next to Normal: The Musical (Original Television Soundtrack)
No.	Title	Performer(s)	Length
1.	"Just Another Day"	Lili Reinhart, Mädchen Amick, Jacquie Lee and Tyson Ritter	3:28
2.	"I Miss the Mountains"	Lili Reinhart and Mädchen Amick	3:44
3.	"Everything Else"	Lili Reinhart, Mädchen Amick and Jacquie Lee	1:52
4.	"Perfect for You"	Cole Sprouse and Erinn Westbrook	2:05
5.	"Superboy and the Invisible Girl"	Camila Mendes	1:53
6.	"It's Gonna Be Good"	Lili Reinhart, Mädchen Amick, Jacquie Lee and Tyson Ritter	1:29
7.	"She's Not Here"	Lili Reinhart	1:19
8.	"I'm Alive"	Jacquie Lee and Tyson Ritter	3:14
9.	"I Am the One"	Lili Reinhart, Jacquie Lee and Tyson Ritter	3:19
10.	"Didn't I See This Movie"	Madelaine Petsch	1:00
11.	"I've Been"	Lili Reinhart and Casey Cott	2:44
12.	"Make Up Your Mind / Catch Me I'm Falling"	Lili Reinhart, Camila Mendes, Vanessa Morgan and Casey Cott	3:00
13.	"Hey #3 / Perfect for You (Reprise)"	Cole Sprouse and Erinn Westbrook	2:23
14.	"A Promise"	Lili Reinhart	2:12
15.	"Maybe (Next to Normal)"	Lili Reinhart and Mädchen Amick	3:02
16.	"Light"	KJ Apa, Lili Reinhart, Camila Mendes, Mädchen Amick, Casey Cott, Vanessa Morgan, Madelaine Petsch, Drew Ray Tanner, Erinn Westbrook, Ryan Robbins and Kyra Leroux	4:23

=== Season 6 ===
Riverdale: Special Episode – American Psycho: The Musical (Original Television Soundtrack)
No.	Title	Artist(s)	Length
1.	"Not a Common Man"	Casey Cott	2:13
2.	"Bread and Roses"	Vanessa Morgan, Erinn Westbrook, KJ Apa and Drew Ray Tanner	1:45
3.	"You Are What You Wear"	Vanessa Morgan, Erinn Westbrook, Camila Mendes, Lili Reinhart, Madelaine Petsch, Caroline Day and Sophia Tatum	1:52
4.	"Killing Spree"	Casey Cott	2:15
5.	"A Girl Before"	Lili Reinhart	3:24

=== Season 7 ===
Riverdale: Special Episode – Archie the Musical (Original Television Soundtrack)
No.	Title	Artist(s)	Length
1.	"Monday, Senior Year"	KJ Apa, Lili Reinhart, Camila Mendes, Cole Sprouse, Madelaine Petsch, Vanessa Morgan, Drew Ray Tanner, Abby Ross, Casey Cott, Shannon Purser, Karl Walcott and Nicholas Barasch	3:24
2.	"Archie's All American"	KJ Apa and Nicholas Barasch	1:36
3.	"I Got Two"	KJ Apa	1:36
4.	"Friday Valentine"	Lili Reinhart, Camila Mendes, Madelaine Petsch and Vanessa Morgan	2:26
5.	"This Is Love"	Casey Cott and Karl Walcott	1:47
6.	"Prom Night"	Nicholas Barasch, Camila Mendes, Lili Reinhart, Abby Ross, Drew Ray Tanner, Shannon Purser, Karl Walcott and Daniel Yang	2:00
7.	"I Got Two (Reprise)"	KJ Apa	0:38
8.	"Do You Know What It's like"	Casey Cott, Karl Walcott, Madelaine Petsch and Vanessa Morgan	2:34
9.	"The Universe Inside"	Lili Reinhart and Camila Mendes	3:00
10.	"Finale (Our Song)"	Casey Cott, KJ Apa, Lili Reinhart, Camila Mendes, Madelaine Petsch, Vanessa Morgan, Karl Walcott, Abby Ross, Drew Ray Tanner, Nicholas Barasch, Shannon Purser and Daniel Yang	3:19

== Release ==
Season	DVD and Blu-ray release dates		
Season	Region 1	Region 2	Region 4
1	August 15, 2017	August 14, 2017	October 4, 2017
2	August 7, 2018	August 20, 2018	October 17, 2018
3	August 13, 2019	TBA	October 16, 2019
4	September 22, 2020	TBA	October 7, 2020
5	January 18, 2022	TBA	February 2, 2022
6	November 29, 2022	TBA	November 30, 2022
7	November 28, 2023	TBA	TBA
Complete Series	November 28, 2023	TBA	TBA

=== Home media ===
The first, second and seventh season in addition to the complete series were released on DVD by Warner Home Entertainment while Warner Archive Collection handled manufacture-on-demand DVD and or Blu-ray formats for several seasons.

=== Broadcast ===
Netflix acquired the exclusive international broadcast rights to Riverdale, making the series available as an original series to its platform less than a day after its original US broadcast.

=== Marketing ===
In July 2016, members of the cast and the executive producers attended San Diego Comic-Con to promote the upcoming series, where they premiered the first episode "Chapter One: The River's Edge". The first trailer for the series was released in late December 2016. The CW also sponsored multiple Tastemade videos, where they cooked several foods that are popular in the Archie universe.

=== Tie-in media ===
Along with heavily promoting the television series in their regular comics since January 2017, Archie Comics released a comic book adaptation of Riverdale, featuring auxiliary story arcs set within the television series' own continuity. The comic book adaptation is headed by Roberto Aguirre-Sacasa himself, along with other writers from the show. Alongside a one-shot pilot issue, illustrated by Alitha Martinez, released in March 2017, the first issue of the ongoing Riverdale comic book series was released starting April 2017.

In addition to the adaptation, Archie Comics are releasing a series of compilation graphic novels branded under the title Road to Riverdale. This series features early issues from the New Riverdale reboot line, introducing the audience of the TV series to the regular ongoing comic series that inspired it. Archie Comics plans to re-print the volumes of Road to Riverdale in subsequent months as digest magazines. The first volume was released in March 2017. Michol Ostow wrote a graphic novel The Ties That Bind, released in May 2021.

Several tie-in novels were also released in conjunction with the show, the first being The Day Before a prequel novel set a day before the events of the first episode. Get Out of Town is set between seasons 2 and 3, and was followed by The Maple Murders, Death of a Cheerleader, and The Poison Pen. The first four novels were written by Micol Ostow, with the fifth book penned by Caleb Roehrig.

== Reception ==
=== Critical response ===
Critical response of Riverdale
Season	Rotten Tomatoes	Metacritic
1	88% (219 reviews)	68 (41 reviews)
2	88% (274 reviews)	—N/a
3	84% (254 reviews)	—N/a
4	84% (63 reviews)	—N/a
5	78% (9 reviews)	—N/a
6	67% (6 reviews)	—N/a

The first season of Riverdale received a generally positive response from critics. On Rotten Tomatoes, it has a fresh rating of 88% based on 62 reviews, with a weighted average of 7.22/10. The site's critical consensus reads, "Riverdale offers an amusingly self-aware reimagining of its classic source material that proves eerie, odd, daring, and above all addictive." On Metacritic, the season has a score of 68 out of 100 based on 41 critics, indicating "generally favorable reviews". Dave Nemetz of TVLine gave the series a "B+" saying that it turned out "to be an artfully crafted, instantly engaging teen soap with loads of potential."

=== Legacy ===
Over the course of its run, Riverdale received widespread attention from critics and on social media for its increasingly campy and outlandish storylines, as well as for subverting teen drama conventions and the expectations of the source material. Rebecca Atler of Vulture deemed the series "one of the weirdest teen soaps ever made," adding that it "took tropes from gothic horror, fantasy, telenovelas, soap operas, comic books, gay art-house films, dark high-school comedies, musicals, and mafia movies and smushed them together into a pop-culture polycule—while the ensemble held it all together, putting it on like some sort of weekly vaudeville act." Sam Bramesco of The Guardian called it "a sprawling soap opera with a liberated relationship to reality, the finest specimen of its genre in its era" and an "unending parade of camp [that] never once committed the cardinal sin of being boring." Emma Stefansky of The Ringer opined that while some fans and journalists criticized subsequent seasons for "relying less and less on coherent plotting to craft its mazelike narrative," such storylines "only enhanced an already heightened experience."

Critics have attributed the escalation to more absurd storytelling to the series' standard-length seasons of approximately 20 episodes, no longer the norm, especially for teen dramas, in the wake of the streaming boom. Kristen Baldwin of Entertainment Weekly opined that "the world where a network allows a lavish, sexy, teen genre drama to run off the rails for seven gloriously outlandish seasons no longer exists," and noted that Riverdale's conclusion came amid the CW's programming shift toward unscripted, sports, and acquired content under its new ownership by Nexstar Media Group. Stefansky praised the CW for allowing a show such as Riverdale to run for seven seasons while a majority of shows are canceled prematurely in the current television landscape, while Monteil opined that "it feels like a miracle that a show as strange and eager for reinvention as Riverdale has existed for so long" in a reboot- and IP-driven market. Ahead of the series finale, Mary Kate Carr of The A.V. Club stated that Riverdale is the "dying gasp" of the teen drama of its era, as "streaming services have saturated the market so much that it's hard to imagine a new teen soap cultivating enough hype or strong enough fandom to command an entire hall at Comic-Con."

Many critics highlighted the show's deviation from its initial premise as a teen drama. In ranking the show's wildest storylines, Abby Monteil of Rolling Stone noted that the series' initial high school-based plot "soon mutated beyond its teen-drama trappings, transforming from a Twin Peaks-esque reimagining of the comics' squeaky-clean source material into a campy, Frankensteinian mash-up of genres, pop-culture references, and pie-in-the-sky melodrama that's frankly unlike anything that came before it." Stefansky noted that the series "never played by conventional teen television's rules; it poked fun at certain clichés while embracing others and mixed the strange with the familiar" and took "more inspiration from Stephen King and Twin Peaks than from John Hughes or Gossip Girl." Bramesco compared the series to Ryan Murphy's "similarly excessive, queer-inflected" American Horror Story, stating that while Murphy aims for prestige, Roberto Aguirre-Sacasa "staunchly refuses to take his work seriously, venturing deeper into his insular funhouse with the express purpose of getting lost."

The series has received widespread derision on social media. According to The Hollywood Reporter, this trend started with "fans posting clips or video compilations of moments from the show on social media, which drew a lot of harsh comments and reactions from people." Bramesco opined that the show's signature dialog "made the program a perennial laughingstock on social media, its juiciest soundbites posted without context for the gawking masses." Stefansky observed that while "fans embraced the show's cringey tendencies[...] those who weren't watching could still feel the bewildered delight of reading word-salad headlines about what was going on." Monteil referred to the series as "a popular internet punching bag, with sneering detractors taking to social media to mock the latest out-of-context viral clip," while also noting that plenty of the criticism aimed at the storylines is valid. One of the most well-known and viral examples comes from a scene where Archie tells a member of the Serpents gang, who claims to have dropped out of school in fourth grade to be a drug runner to support his family, that he has not "experienced the triumphs and defeats, the epic highs and lows of high school football". Lili Reinhart responded to the criticism, expressing that it had been difficult for the cast to be "the butt of the joke" online, adding, "We all want to be actors; we're passionate about what we do. So when the absurdity of our show became a talking point, it was difficult." Cole Sprouse noted that such criticism was contained to the United States and that viewers in Europe were more receptive to the show's absurdity. Camila Mendes stated that since the series is based on comic books, the storylines are no more absurd than those in the Marvel Cinematic Universe, and both she and Reinhart concurred that Aguirre-Sacasa's intention had always been to make the show absurd, campy, and outlandish.

=== Controversy ===
The series changed the character Jughead Jones' sexual and romantic orientation from aromantic and asexual to heterosexual. This deviation from the source material was met with criticism describing it as a-spec erasure.

=== Popularity on Netflix ===
Riverdale has also been noted as being one of the most popular shows worldwide on the popular streaming platform Netflix. The large number of fans watching the series on the platform also gave the show a large bump in the ratings for its season two premiere. This was later referenced on multiple occasions by The CW's president, Mark Pedowitz, who noted that they would watch Netflix numbers more closely for new series after seeing how Riverdale did on the platform. Season four was posted onto the website in the US on May 15, 2020, and remained in the top ten titles on the platform for the following month. In the UK, it was also the most popular program on the streaming service in May.

==== Popularity in Australia ====
Riverdale notably enjoyed widespread success in Australia during its original run. During its original broadcast, Riverdale was broadcast in the country as a Netflix Original Series hours after its US broadcast and during the late 2010s, was one of the most popular shows in the country regularly entering the national top 10 of the most viewed TV shows. During the last week of October 2018 Riverdale was the number 1 show in Australia.

=== Ratings ===
Viewership and ratings per season of Riverdale
Season	Timeslot (ET)	Episodes	First aired		Last aired		TV season	Viewership rank	Avg. viewers (millions)	18–49 rank	Avg. 18–49 rating
Season	Timeslot (ET)	Episodes	Date	Viewers (millions)	Date	Viewers (millions)	TV season	Viewership rank	Avg. viewers (millions)	18–49 rank	Avg. 18–49 rating
1	Thursday 9:00 p.m.	13	January 26, 2017	1.38	May 11, 2017	0.96	2016–17	154	1.69	142	0.7
2	Wednesday 8:00 p.m.	22	October 11, 2017	2.34	May 16, 2018	1.28	2017–18	173	2.12	126	0.8
3	Wednesday 8:00 p.m.	22	October 10, 2018	1.50	May 15, 2019	0.86	2018–19	166	1.74	120	0.7
4	Wednesday 8:00 p.m.	19	October 9, 2019	1.14	May 6, 2020	0.65	2019–20	122	1.35	120	0.5
5	Wednesday 8:00 p.m.	19	January 20, 2021	0.63	October 6, 2021	0.36	2020–21	145	1.01	119	0.4
6	Tuesday 9:00 p.m. (Part 1); Sunday 8:00 p.m. (Part 2)	22	November 16, 2021	0.33	July 31, 2022	0.17	2021–22	138	0.46	130	0.1
7	Wednesday 9:00 p.m.	20	March 29, 2023	0.26	August 23, 2023	0.21	2022–23	129	0.39	120	0.1

=== Awards and nominations ===
Year	Award	Category	Nominee(s)	Result	Ref.
2017	Leo Awards	Best Production Design in a Dramatic Series	Tyler Harron (for "The River's Edge")	Nominated	
2017	Saturn Awards	Best Action-Thriller Television Series	Riverdale	Won	
2017	Saturn Awards	Best Performance by a Younger Actor in a Television Series	KJ Apa	Nominated	
2017	Saturn Awards	Breakthrough Performance	KJ Apa	Won	
2017	Teen Choice Awards	Choice Breakout TV Show	Riverdale	Won	
2017	Teen Choice Awards	Choice Breakout TV Star	KJ Apa	Nominated	
2017	Teen Choice Awards	Choice Breakout TV Star	Lili Reinhart	Won	
2017	Teen Choice Awards	Choice Drama TV Actor	Cole Sprouse	Won	
2017	Teen Choice Awards	Choice Drama TV Show	Riverdale	Won	
2017	Teen Choice Awards	Choice Hissy Fit	Madelaine Petsch	Won	
2017	Teen Choice Awards	Choice Scene Stealer	Camila Mendes	Won	
2017	Teen Choice Awards	Choice TV Ship	Lili Reinhart and Cole Sprouse	Won	
2018	Dorian Awards	Campy TV Show of the Year	Riverdale	Nominated	
2018	Leo Awards	Best Cinematography in a Dramatic Series	Brendan Uegama (for "House of the Devil")	Won	
2018	Leo Awards	Best Costume Design in a Dramatic Series	Rebekka Sorensen-Kjelstrup (for "Death Proof")	Nominated	
2018	Leo Awards	Best Dramatic Series	Riverdale	Nominated	
2018	Leo Awards	Best Guest Performance by a Female in a Dramatic Series	Tiera Skovbye (for "The Outsiders")	Nominated	
2018	Leo Awards	Best Production Design in a Dramatic Series	Tony Wohlgemuth (for "A Kiss Before Dying")	Won	
2018	Leo Awards	Best Sound Editing in a Dramatic Series	Brian Lyster (for "Tales from the Darkside")	Nominated	
2018	MTV Movie & TV Awards	Best Kiss	KJ Apa and Camila Mendes	Nominated	
2018	MTV Movie & TV Awards	Best Musical Moment	Riverdale	Nominated	
2018	MTV Movie & TV Awards	Scene Stealer	Madelaine Petsch	Won	
2018	MTV Movie & TV Awards	Show of the Year	Riverdale	Nominated	
2018	People's Choice Awards	Drama Show of 2018	Riverdale	Won	
2018	People's Choice Awards	Drama TV Star of 2018	KJ Apa	Nominated	
2018	People's Choice Awards	Female TV Star of 2018	Camila Mendes	Nominated	
2018	People's Choice Awards	Male TV Star of 2018	Cole Sprouse	Nominated	
2018	Saturn Awards	Best Action-Thriller Television Series	Riverdale	Nominated	
2018	Saturn Awards	Best Performance by a Younger Actor in a Television Series	KJ Apa	Nominated	
2018	Saturn Awards	Best Performance by a Younger Actor in a Television Series	Lili Reinhart	Nominated	
2018	Saturn Awards	Best Performance by a Younger Actor in a Television Series	Cole Sprouse	Nominated	
2018	Teen Choice Awards	Choice Breakout TV Star	Vanessa Morgan	Won	
2018	Teen Choice Awards	Choice Hissy Fit	Madelaine Petsch	Won	
2018	Teen Choice Awards	Choice Drama TV Actor	KJ Apa	Nominated	
2018	Teen Choice Awards	Choice Drama TV Actor	Cole Sprouse	Won	
2018	Teen Choice Awards	Choice Drama TV Actress	Camila Mendes	Nominated	
2018	Teen Choice Awards	Choice Drama TV Actress	Lili Reinhart	Won	
2018	Teen Choice Awards	Choice Drama TV Show	Riverdale	Won	
2018	Teen Choice Awards	Choice Liplock	Cole Sprouse and Lili Reinhart	Won	
2018	Teen Choice Awards	Choice Scene Stealer	Vanessa Morgan	Won	
2018	Teen Choice Awards	Choice TV Ship	KJ Apa and Camilla Mendes	Nominated	
2018	Teen Choice Awards	Choice TV Ship	Lili Reinhart and Cole Sprouse	Won	
2018	Teen Choice Awards	Choice TV Villain	Mark Consuelos	Won	
2019	Dorian Awards	Campy TV Show of the Year	Riverdale	Nominated	
2019	Kids' Choice Awards	Favorite TV Drama	Riverdale	Won	
2019	Leo Awards	Best Cinematography in a Dramatic Series	Brendan Uegama (for "A Night to Remember")	Won	
2019	Leo Awards	Best Cinematography in a Dramatic Series	Ronald Richard (for "The Midnight Club")	Nominated	
2019	Leo Awards	Best Production Design in a Dramatic Series	Tony Wohlgemuth (for "The Red Dahlia")	Won	
2019	MTV Movie & TV Awards	Best Kiss	Charles Melton and Camila Mendes	Nominated	
2019	MTV Movie & TV Awards	Best Show	Riverdale	Nominated	
2019	Saturn Awards	Best Action-Thriller Television Series	Riverdale	Nominated	
2019	Saturn Awards	Best Performance by a Younger Actor in a Television Series	KJ Apa	Nominated	
2019	Saturn Awards	Best Performance by a Younger Actor in a Television Series	Cole Sprouse	Nominated	
2019	Teen Choice Awards	Choice Drama TV Actor	KJ Apa	Nominated	
2019	Teen Choice Awards	Choice Drama TV Actor	Cole Sprouse	Won	
2019	Teen Choice Awards	Choice Drama TV Actress	Camila Mendes	Nominated	
2019	Teen Choice Awards	Choice Drama TV Actress	Lili Reinhart	Won	
2019	Teen Choice Awards	Choice Drama TV Show	Riverdale	Won	
2019	Teen Choice Awards	Choice TV Ship	Madelaine Petsch and Vanessa Morgan	Nominated	
2019	Teen Choice Awards	Choice TV Ship	Lili Reinhart and Cole Sprouse	Won	
2020	People's Choice Awards	Drama Show of 2020	Riverdale	Won	
2020	People's Choice Awards	The Male TV Star of 2020	Cole Sprouse	Won	
2020	People's Choice Awards	The Female TV Star of 2020	Lili Reinhart	Nominated	
2020	People's Choice Awards	Drama TV Star of 2020	Cole Sprouse	Nominated	
2021	Critics' Choice Super Awards	Best Actress in a Superhero Series	Lili Reinhart	Nominated	
2021	Saturn Awards	Best Action / Thriller Television Series	Riverdale	Nominated	
2022	Saturn Awards	Best Fantasy Television Series	Riverdale	Nominated	

== Shared universe ==
=== Chilling Adventures of Sabrina (2018–2020) ===
In September 2017, it was reported that a live-action television series based on the comic series Chilling Adventures of Sabrina was being developed for The CW by Berlanti Productions and Warner Bros. Television, with a planned release in the 2018–2019 television season. The series, featuring the Archie Comics character Sabrina Spellman, would be a companion series to Riverdale. Lee Toland Krieger directed the pilot, which was written by Aguirre-Sacasa. Both are executive producers along with Berlanti, Schechter, and Goldwater. In December 2017, it was reported that the project had moved to Netflix under a new title. In January 2018, CW president Mark Pedowitz noted that, "at the moment, there is no discussion about crossing over" with Riverdale. Aguirre-Sacasa added that no crossovers were planned so that each series could establish "their own identities and own set of rules". Filming for the first season began on March 19, 2018, just as filming of the second season of Riverdale concluded, which allowed the same crew members to work on both series.

Sabrina's town, Greendale, is introduced in the second season of Riverdale. Following that, several references to the two cities are made regularly in the two series, visually or with dialogue. In the first season of Chilling Adventures of Sabrina, which premiered on October 26, 2018, Moses Thiessen reprises his role as Ben Button from Riverdale during an episode. In the episode "Chapter Sixty-Seven: Varsity Blues" from the fourth season of Riverdale, Ty Wood reprises his role as Billy Marlin from Sabrina. In the episode "Chapter Twenty-Three: Heavy Is the Crown" from the third part of Sabrina, the teenage witch and her cousin visit Riverdale in search for a crown that was owned by Benjamin Blossom, an ancestor of Cheryl. On their way, they pass the town sign. On its back, Jughead Jones spray painted the message "JJ Wuz Here", his signature. Three episodes later, a member of the Southside Serpents is attacked by Hilda Spellman.

Regarding a proper crossover, Aguirre-Sacasa said in October 2018 he would "hate for [a crossover] to never happen" between the two series, adding a potential idea for one could see the characters of Riverdale "hear[ing] about a haunted house in Greendale and try to break in and it's Sabrina's house". He also felt since each series was already established, a crossover could happen in a standalone film with both casts, potentially titled Afterlife with Archie, based on the Archie Horror comic of the same name.

Sabrina was canceled by Netflix in July 2020, when showrunner Sacasa later announced that if it had been renewed, Riverdale and Sabrina would have had a proper crossover event. Kiernan Shipka later reprised her role as Sabrina in the sixth season of Riverdale, first appearing in "Chapter Ninety-Nine: The Witching Hour(s)", an episode set in an alternative universe called Rivervale where Sabrina is called by Cheryl to help her with a spell. Shipka also reprised the role later that season, in an episode set in the original continuity of the two series and after the events of Sabrina, providing closure to plot points from the latter series. Nicholas Scratch also appeared in the episode, portrayed by Cole Sprouse, following a temporary resurrection spell used on Jughead's body.

=== Katy Keene (2020) ===
In August 2018, Aguirre-Sacasa revealed that another spin-off was in development at The CW. He said that the series would be "very different from Riverdale" and that it would be produced "in [the 2018–19] development cycle." By January 2019, The CW issued a pilot order for the series stating that the plot will: "[follow] the lives and loves of four iconic Archie Comics characters—including fashion legend-to-be Katy Keene (Lucy Hale)—as they chase their twenty-something dreams in New York City. This musical dramedy chronicles the origins and struggles of four aspiring artists trying to make it on Broadway, on the runway and in the recording studio." In February of the same year, it was announced that Ashleigh Murray, who portrays Josie McCoy in Riverdale, had been cast in a lead role for Katy Keene, leading to her exit from the former. By August 2019, Michael Grassi announced that there was a crossover between Riverdale and Katy Keene being developed. The crossover episode aired on February 5, 2020, one day before the premiere of Katy Keene on February 6, 2020.

In the episode "Chapter Six: Mama Said" from the first season of Katy Keene, Robin Givens reprises her role as Sierra McCoy from Riverdale. Four episodes later, Casey Cott reprises his role as Kevin Keller in "Chapter Ten: Gloria". In the last episode of the first season, Mark Consuelos reprises his role as Hiram Lodge.

On July 2, 2020, the series was canceled after one season. Despite the cancellation, characters from Katy Keene appear in Riverdale: Zane Holtz reprised his role as K.O. Kelly in the first episode of season five and in the tenth episode of season six, followed by Ryan Faucett as Bernardo in the seventh episode of the same season, while Lucy Hale reprised her role in a voice-over cameo in the eighth episode, and Camille Hyde reprised her role as Alexandra Cabot in the fifteenth episode. The character Chad Gekko, who appeared in two episodes of Katy Keene, also returned as a recurring character in season five, played by Chris Mason. Mason replaced Reid Prebenda, who portrayed the character in the spin-off.

=== Pretty Little Liars (2022–2024) ===
In 2022, Aguirre-Sacasa confirmed that Riverdale and Pretty Little Liars (2022) (with the latter have been retconned) and by extension the original series, and the two spin-offs, were both placed and set in the same universe. The series premiered on July 28, 2022, with the first season subtitled Original Sin. In the sixth episode of the first season, Eddie Lamb, a character from the original series, states that some of the more lucrative patients at the Radley Sanitarium were sent to the Sisters of Quiet Mercy in Riverdale before the Radley was converted to a hotel, effectively confirming that both series are part of a larger shared universe.

In the second and final season subtitled Summer School, recurring character Greg Mantzoukas reveals that he is the cousin of Kevin Keller in the sixth episode, further cementing the connection between both series.

=== Abandoned projects ===
==== Jake Chang ====
By September 2020, Aguirre-Sacasa was preparing another spin-off series based on an Archie Comics property. In August 2021, The CW announced Jake Chang, a noir teen mystery drama series spinoff of Riverdale focusing on the character of Jake Chang, a teen prodigy detective mystery solver. The network later ordered a pilot in May 2022. Aguirre-Sacasa as well various other crew members from the show's production team were to write and executive produce for the series. The CW officially passed on the series in May 2023.
