= Adam Taylor =

American composer

- Origin: Long Beach, California, United States
- Genres: Soundtrack; electronic
- Occupations: Composer; record producer; musician
- Years active: 2010s–present

Adam Taylor is an American composer. He is best known for his contributions to film and television scores, such as The Handmaid's Tale, Before I Fall, I Think We're Alone Now and Chilling Adventures of Sabrina.

Taylor's work on The Handmaid's Tale was twice nominated for the Primetime Emmy Award for Outstanding Music Composition for a Series, in 2019 and 2021.

== Biography ==
Adam Taylor is a film score composer based in Long Beach, California, known for his subdued, emotional, and minimalistic scores. Taylor began his career scoring documentary and short films before being enlisted for John Wells’ August: Osage County. Since then, he has become a prominent and sought-after composer, scoring Before I Fall from director Ry Russo-Young. Taylor is most notable for his frequent collaboration with director Reed Morano, scoring her directorial debut Meadowland, starring Olivia Wilde, Luke Wilson, and Elisabeth Moss. Taylor created the score for the critically acclaimed award-winning series, The Handmaid's Tale for Hulu/MGM. He is also known for scoring The Chilling Adventures of Sabrina (Netflix/Archie Comics), produced by Roberto Aguirre-Sacasa and Greg Berlanti; The Right Stuff (Disney+), produced by Leonardo DiCaprio’s Appian Way; and Black Cake (Hulu), produced by Oprah Winfrey’s Harpo Films and created by Marissa Jo Cerar. Taylor scored Riff Raff (Lionsgate) directed by Dito Monteil starring Bill Murray, Pete Davidson, Ed Harris, and Jennifer Coolidge (2025).

== Filmography ==
As composer

- Meadowland (2015)
- Before I Fall (2017)
- Curvature (2017)
- The Handmaid's Tale (2017–2025)
- Damnation (2017–2018)
- I Think We're Alone Now (2018)
- Chilling Adventures of Sabrina (2018–2020)
- Riff Raff (2024)
