= Chilling Adventures of Sabrina (TV series) =

American supernatural television series (2018–2020)

- Genre: Horror; Supernatural; Dark fantasy; Teen drama
- Based on: Chilling Adventures of Sabrina by Roberto Aguirre-Sacasa and Robert Hack
- Developed by: Roberto Aguirre-Sacasa
- Starring: Kiernan Shipka; Ross Lynch; Lucy Davis; Miranda Otto; Chance Perdomo; Michelle Gomez; Jaz Sinclair; Tati Gabrielle; Adeline Rudolph; Richard Coyle; Lachlan Watson; Gavin Leatherwood
- Composer: Adam Taylor
- Country of origin: United States
- Original language: English
- No. of seasons: 2 (4 parts)
- No. of episodes: 36 (list of episodes)

Production
- Executive producers: Lee Toland Krieger; Jon Goldwater; Sarah Schechter; Roberto Aguirre-Sacasa; Greg Berlanti
- Producers: Craig Forrest; Ryan Lindenberg; Matthew Barry
- Production locations: Vancouver, British Columbia
- Cinematography: David Lanzenberg; Brendan Michael Uegama; Stephen Maier; Craig Powell; Stephen Jackson
- Editors: Harry Jierjian; Gaston Jaren Lopez; Rita K. Sanders; Elizabeth Czyzewki; Jason Cherella; Erin Wolf; Leigh Dodson; Amy Stuvland Parks; Marvin Matyka; Joseph Hatton; Jaron Downs
- Running time: 49–63 minutes
- Production companies: Berlanti Productions; Archie Comics; Muckle Man Productions (season 2); Warner Bros. Television

Original release
- Network: Netflix
- Release: October 26, 2018 – December 31, 2020

Related
- Riverdale

Chilling Adventures of Sabrina is an American supernatural horror television series developed by Roberto Aguirre-Sacasa for Netflix, based on the Archie comic book series of the same name. It ran from October 2018 to December 2020 for two seasons (split in four parts). The series is produced by Warner Bros. Television, in association with Berlanti Productions and Archie Comics. Aguirre-Sacasa and Greg Berlanti serve as executive producers, alongside Sarah Schechter, Jon Goldwater, and Lee Toland Krieger.

The series is centered on the Archie Comics character Sabrina Spellman, portrayed by Kiernan Shipka, and also stars Ross Lynch, Lucy Davis, Miranda Otto, Chance Perdomo, Michelle Gomez, Jaz Sinclair, Tati Gabrielle, Adeline Rudolph, Lachlan Watson, Gavin Leatherwood, and Richard Coyle. Originally in development during September 2017 at the CW, the series was intended to be a companion series to Riverdale; however, in December 2017, the project was moved to Netflix with a straight-to-series order, consisting of twenty episodes. Filming took place in Vancouver, British Columbia.

The first half of the first season, consisting of ten episodes, was released on October 26, 2018. The series received positive reviews, with critics praising Shipka's performance, as well as the premise, visuals, and directing. A Christmas special episode was released on December 14, 2018, and the second half of the first season was released on April 5, 2019, consisting of nine episodes. In December 2018, Netflix renewed the series for a second season consisting of 16 episodes, split into two equal parts, of which the first eight episodes were released on January 24, 2020, with the second set released on December 31, 2020.

In July 2020, Netflix cancelled the series due to the COVID-19 pandemic. Two crossovers with Riverdale occurred during the sixth season of that series, acting as a backdoor series finale, with Shipka reprising her role.

== Premise ==
Chilling Adventures of Sabrina is set in the fictional town of Greendale. It is a dark coming-of-age story that includes horror, fear and witchcraft. Sabrina Spellman must reconcile her dual nature as a half-witch, half-mortal while fighting the evil forces that threaten her, her family, and the daylight world humans inhabit.

== Cast and characters ==
=== Main ===
- Kiernan Shipka as Sabrina Spellman: A half-human, half-witch teenager attending Baxter High, who is just beginning her dark education, while trying to maintain a normal life. She is being raised by her two aunts due to her being orphaned as a baby. She also lives with her cousin Ambrose who is often a source of comfort and aid for Sabrina. Mckenna Grace plays a young Sabrina Spellman in flashbacks. Shipka also portrays Sabrina Morningstar, a version of Sabrina from an alternate timeline.
- Ross Lynch as Harvey Kinkle: Sabrina's boyfriend in part 1. He is the son of a coal miner and descended from witch hunters who hunted the Church of Night. He uses his skills as a witch hunter to help Sabrina and his friends fight the forces of darkness.
- Miranda Otto as Zelda Spellman: One of Sabrina's two witch aunts, who is sterner than Hilda and often clashes with her over their different beliefs. She often shows care for mortals too despite her contempt for them at times. She is also a member of the Church of Night.
- Lucy Davis as Hilda Spellman: One of Sabrina's two witch aunts, who has a motherly nature and warm sense of humor, and is skilled at brewing potions. Due to her nice nature, she often lets her sister walk over her.
- Chance Perdomo as Ambrose Spellman: Sabrina's warlock cousin from England, who is her partner in crime. He was formerly forbidden from leaving the Spellman home after being placed under house arrest by the Witches Council for attempting to blow up the Vatican. He runs the Spellman mortuary with his aunties.
- Michelle Gomez as Mary Wardwell and Lilith / Madam Satan: The first wife of Adam from the Garden of Eden, who steals the identity of Mary Wardwell, Sabrina's favorite teacher and mentor at Baxter High; a cunning manipulator, she intends to groom Sabrina to take her place as Satan's foot soldier so that she herself can rise to be his queen.
- Jaz Sinclair as Rosalind "Roz" Walker: The brash, empowered and outspoken daughter of Greendale's minister and Sabrina's best friend.
- Tati Gabrielle as Prudence Blackwood (née Night): A student at the Academy of the Unseen Arts, with a personal grudge against Sabrina. She is the leader of a trio of orphan witches, the Weird Sisters.
- Adeline Rudolph as Agatha: A student at the Academy of the Unseen Arts, who is one of the Weird Sisters.
- Richard Coyle as Father Faustus Blackwood: The former High Priest of the Church of Night and Dean of the Academy of the Unseen Arts, who gets into conflict with Sabrina.
- Lachlan Watson as Theo Putnam (parts 3–4; recurring parts 1–2): Sabrina's close friend at Baxter High. Theo is a transgender boy whose birth name was Susie, Theo comes out in part 2.
- Gavin Leatherwood as Nicholas "Nick" Scratch (parts 3–4; recurring parts 1–2): A powerful warlock and student at the Academy of the Unseen Arts who eventually becomes romantically involved with Sabrina.

=== Recurring ===
- Abigail Cowen as Dorcas (parts 1–3; guest part 4): An orphaned witch and student at the Academy of the Unseen Arts, who is one of the Weird Sisters.
- Darren Mann as Lucas "Luke" Chalfant (parts 1–2): A warlock with whom Ambrose was romantically involved.
- Adrian Hough as Joe Putnam (part 1; guest part 2): Theo's old-fashioned but caring father.
- Ty Wood as Billy Marlin: The leader of the jocks who often bully Theo.
- Bronson Pinchot as George Hawthorne (parts 1; guest Part 3): Baxter High's villainous, misogynistic and puritanical principal, who often hits on Ms. Wardwell (Madam Satan) and does not get along with Sabrina.
- Alessandro Juliani as Dr. Cerberus (Dr. Cee): The owner of the local book store where Hilda works; Hilda's love interest and later husband.
- Chris Rosamond as Mr. Kinkle (parts 1, 3–4; guest part 2): Harvey and Tommy's drunk father who owns the mines. He has a tense relationship with Harvey.
- Annette Reilly as Diana Spellman (part 1; guest part 2): Sabrina's mortal mother who died in a plane crash with her husband Edward when Sabrina was a baby.
- Peter Bundic as Carl Tapper: One of the jocks who often bully Theo.
- Justin Dobies as Thomas "Tommy" Kinkle (part 1; guest part 3): Harvey's nurturing and protective older brother who works in the Greendale mines so that Harvey can stay in school.
- Alvina August as Lady Constance Blackwood (part 1; guest part 2): Father Faustus Blackwood's wife. She died in childbirth, and haunts Zelda when she gets engaged to Faustus Blackwood.
- Georgie Daburas as Edward Spellman (parts 1–2; guest parts 3–4): Sabrina's father who was the High Priest of the Church of Night before he died in a plane crash with his wife, Diana.
- Jedidiah Goodacre as Dorian Gray (parts 2–3; guest part 4): A warlock and the owner of Dorian's Gray Room, an exclusive nightclub. He is gifted immortality by Satan in trade for his soul.
- Tyler Cotton as Melvin (parts 2–4): A warlock and student at the Academy of the Unseen Arts.
- Alexis Denisof as Adam Masters (part 2): Mary Wardwell's handsome and charming boyfriend who returns to Greendale after working overseas with Physicians Without Frontiers.
- Emily Haine as Elspeth (parts 2–3; guest part 4): A witch and student at the Academy of Unseen Arts.
- Luke Cook as Lucifer Morningstar (parts 3–4; guest part 2): The Dark Lord in his human form, he is Sabrina's birth father and Madam Satan's former lover.
  - Cook also voices Sitcom Salem Saberhagen in the episode "Chapter Thirty-Five: The Endless" from part 4. Cook replaces Nick Bakay who voiced the character in the 1996 series.
- Sam Corlett as Caliban (parts 3–4): A prince of Hell who was born of clay and challenges Sabrina for the Throne of Hell.
- Skye Marshall as Mambo Marie LeFleur / Baron Samedi (parts 3–4): A Haitian voodoo witch who helps Prudence and Ambrose in their search for Blackwood.
- Jonathan Whitesell as Robin Goodfellow (parts 3–4):A young and charming hobgoblin.
- Will Swenson as Professor Carcosa / Pan (part 3): The leader of a pagan troupe who runs a carnival and are secretly attempting to raise the Old Gods.
- Vanessa Rubio as Nagaina (part 3): A Gorgon and member of Carcosa's troupe.
- Lucie Guest as Circe (part 3): A Witch of Transformation and member of Carcosa's troupe.
- Salem appears in the series, Sabrina's familiar spirit.

=== Guest ===
- Sarah-Jane Redmond as Mrs Kemper (part 1): The adoptive mother of a warlock who was mysteriously murdered.
- Kurt Max Runte as Mr. Kemper (part 1): The adoptive father of a warlock who was mysteriously murdered.
- John Rubinstein as Daniel Webster (part 1): A mortal lawyer who defends Sabrina in her trial.
- Jason Beaudoin as Jesse Putnam (parts 1 and 3): Theo's uncle who is possessed by a demon.
- Megan Leitch as Batibat (parts 1 and 3): A sleep demon who is accidentally freed by Sabrina after solving her father's puzzle.
- Moses Thiessen as Ben Button (part 1): A pizza delivery boy from Riverdale. This character was introduced on Riverdale.
- L. Scott Caldwell as Nana Ruth Walker (parts 1 and 3–4): Roz's grandmother who is blind due to witches who cursed the women of the Walker family.
- Michael Hogan as Grandfather Kinkle (part 1): Harvey and Tommy's grandfather.
- Liam Hughes as Quentin (parts 1–2): A ghost child bound to the Academy of the Unseen Arts who assists Sabrina.
- Brian Markinson as Bartel (part 1): A Christmas demon, based on Krampus.
- Heather Doerksen (parts 1 and 3) and Samantha Coughlan (part 4) as Gryla: An ancient, dangerous witch.
- Anastasia Bandey as Dorothea Putnam (parts 1–2): Theo's ancestor who brought the coven to Greendale centuries ago on safe passage.
- Spencer Treat Clark as Jerathmiel (part 2): A mysterious witch hunter who sets out to kill all the witches in Greendale.
- William B. Davis as Methuselah (part 2): A corrupt member of the Witches Council.
- Jasmine Vega as Lizzie (parts 3–4): A Baxter High student and captain of the Baxter High Ravenettes cheerleading team.
- Darius Willis and Whitney Peak as Judas and Judith Blackwood (parts 3–4): The children of Faustus and Constance and half-siblings of Prudence.
- Caroline Rhea and Beth Broderick as Sitcom Hilda Spellman and Sitcom Zelda Spellman (part 4): Reprising their roles from the 1996 series, but in modified version. In this version, their characters are evil demons instead of good witches.
- Riker Lynch as Trash (part 4): The lead singer of Satanic Panic.

== Episodes ==
Part	Season	Episodes		Originally released
1	1	11	10	October 26, 2018
1	1	11	1	December 14, 2018
2	1	9		April 5, 2019
3	2	8		January 24, 2020
4	2	8		December 31, 2020

== Production ==
=== Development ===
In September 2017, it was reported that a live-action television series based on the comic book Chilling Adventures of Sabrina was being developed for the CW by Warner Bros. Television and Berlanti Productions, with a planned release in the 2018–19 television season. The series would be a companion series to Riverdale. Lee Toland Krieger would direct the pilot, which would be written by Roberto Aguirre-Sacasa. Both are executive producers along with Greg Berlanti, Sarah Schechter, and Jon Goldwater. In December 2017, the project had moved to Netflix under a yet-to-be-announced new title. Two seasons, comprising ten episodes each, had been ordered by the streaming service; this was later altered to be one, 20-episode season split across two parts. CW President Mark Pedowitz stated that Netflix's ability to offer a two-season commitment enticed Warner Bros. Television to move the series to the streaming service. In early May 2018, Chilling Adventures of Sabrina was officially confirmed as the series' title. The series was inspired by "slow-burn horror" films such as The Exorcist, Rosemary's Baby, and other "great satanic horror movies from the 1960s and 1970s". The opening title sequence features the art of Robert Hack, the original artist of the comic book series.

On November 12, 2018, Netflix announced that the eleventh episode of the twenty episodes ordered would be released as a Christmas special episode. It was not always the plan for the series to have a Christmas-themed episode. During production of the first episode of the second part, Aguirre-Sacasa realized that the series had already done episodes related to Halloween and Thanksgiving in the first part, and decided to create the episode. He noted the episode "was by and large self-contained, but that there are still elements that carry it through and the realizations and relationships and mythology — it sort of threads the needle. And so we figured out a story that could do both." The episode was also helpful for Netflix, who wanted some sort of additional, standalone content to release between the first two parts. On December 18, 2018, Netflix renewed the series for a second season of 16 episodes, which was also split into two parts. On July 8, 2020, Netflix cancelled the series due to the COVID-19 pandemic.

=== Casting ===
In January 2018, Kiernan Shipka was cast as Sabrina Spellman. Shipka was Aguirre-Sacasa's first choice for the role. The next month, Jaz Sinclair was cast as Rosalind "Roz" Walker, along with Michelle Gomez as Mary Wardwell / Madam Satan, Chance Perdomo as Ambrose Spellman, Lucy Davis as Hilda Spellman, Miranda Otto as Zelda Spellman, and Richard Coyle as Father Faustus Blackwood. In March 2018, Ross Lynch joined the cast as Harvey Kinkle, while Tati Gabrielle was cast as Prudence Night. In early March 2018, Bronson Pinchot, Adeline Rudolph, and Abigail Cowen, were cast as George Hawthorne, Agatha, and Dorcas, respectively. In November 2018, it was revealed that Alexis Denisof and Jedidiah Goodacre would join the cast in the second part in the recurring roles of Adam Masters and Dorian Gray, respectively, while Mckenna Grace would portray a young Sabrina in the Christmas special episode.

In June 2019, it was reported that Lachlan Watson and Gavin Leatherwood had been promoted to the main cast for the second season. In December 2019, Sam Corlett, Skye Marshall, and Jonathan Whitesell were cast in recurring roles for part 3 of the series.

=== Filming ===
Filming for the first part began on March 19, 2018, just as filming of the second season of Riverdale concluded, which allowed the same crew members to work on both series. The first two parts were filmed back-to-back, with filming on the second part concluding on December 21, 2018. Filming had been expected to begin in February 2018 and last until June 2018. The first episode of the second part was the eleventh episode filmed, while the Christmas special was the twelfth episode filmed, despite the Christmas special being released as the eleventh episode overall in the series. This was because the idea for the Christmas special came about when the first episode of the second part was "too far down the line" to alter its production schedule. Despite the production switch, Aguirre-Sacasa said the first episode of the second part was written "as a premiere episode for the second part" and helps kick-off the storylines for the part. Production on the second season, consisting of the third and fourth parts, began on May 17, 2019, and concluded on February 22, 2020.

=== Connection to Riverdale ===
The series was originally conceived as a companion series to Riverdale when it was in development for the CW; however, after the series was moved to Netflix, it was unclear if any connection would remain. In January 2018, CW president Mark Pedowitz noted that, "at the moment, there is no discussion about crossing over." In March 2018, Jon Goldwater confirmed that the two series were "two separate entities for right now" but "would love it if they could figure out a way to cross over." Goldwater also felt there was a possibility for the characters to appear on future episodes of Riverdale, since Greendale had already been mentioned as existing on that series.

Sabrina's town, Greendale, is introduced in the second season of Riverdale. Following that, several references to the two cities are made regularly in the two series, visually or in dialogue. In the first season of Chilling Adventures of Sabrina, Moses Thiessen reprises his role as Ben Button from Riverdale during an episode. In the episode "Chapter Sixty-Seven: Varsity Blues" from the fourth season of Riverdale, Ty Wood reprises his role as Billy Marlin from Sabrina.

In episode "Chapter Twenty-Three: Heavy Is the Crown" from the third part of Sabrina, the teenage witch and her cousin visit Riverdale in search for a crown that was owned by Benjamin Blossom, an ancestor of Cheryl. On their way, they pass the town sign. On its back, Jughead Jones spray painted the message "JJ Wuz Here", his signature. Three episodes later, a member of the Southside Serpents is attacked by a mutated Hilda Spellman.

In episode "Chapter Thirty-Four: The Returned" from the fourth part of Sabrina, a battle-of-the-bands poster lists the "Fred Heads" as an entrant in the competition. This was the name of the high school garage band of Archie's father Fred Andrews.

Regarding a proper crossover, Aguirre-Sacasa said in October 2018 he would "hate [for a crossover] to never happen" between the two series, adding that a potential idea for one would see the characters of Riverdale "hear[ing] about a haunted house in Greendale and try[ing] to break in and it's Sabrina's house". He also stated that since both series were already established, a crossover could happen in a standalone film with both casts, potentially titled Afterlife with Archie, based on the Archie Horror comic book series of the same name.

On October 7, 2021, it was announced that Shipka would be reprising her role as Sabrina in the sixth season of Riverdale. During the same season, the series introduced the character Heather Chandler, played by Caroline Day, a witch from Greendale and from Sabrina's coven.

=== Lawsuit ===
In November 2018, Satanic Temple activists sued the series' production team over the use of the Statue of Baphomet, which they claim was a direct copy of their own statue and portrayed the Temple in an inaccurate and derogatory way. Temple members were also concerned about the depiction of Satanists as cannibals practicing forced worship. On November 21, 2018, it was confirmed that Satanic Temple and Netflix had amicably settled the lawsuit dispute, with the terms of the deal left undisclosed to the public.

== Music ==
On March 15, 2019, WaterTower Music released a digital EP with four songs performed by some of the members of the series' cast during the first part of the first season. A compilation of songs from the first season, including six songs performed by the cast (four from the EP and two new songs), was released on digital by WaterTower Music on April 5, 2019. Soundtrack from the first part of the second season was released on January 24, 2020, followed by the soundtrack for the last part on January 1, 2021.

An album of Adam Taylor's scoring for season 1 was released on compact disc by La-La Land Records, and simultaneously on download by WaterTower Music, on August 16, 2020. The soundtrack and score from the first season was released by Waxwork Records in 2020 on 180-gram vinyl, which was a triple LP.

=== Season 1 ===
Chilling Adventures of Sabrina: Original Television Soundtrack – Season One
No.	Title	Artist(s)	Length
1.	"Main Title (Chilling Adventures of Sabrina)"	Adam Taylor	1:39
2.	"Bad Moon Rising"	Creedence Clearwater Revival	2:21
3.	"I Put a Spell on You"	Sylvia Black	2:40
4.	"Terrible Thing"	AG	3:38
5.	"Sixteen Candles"	Stray Cats	2:54
6.	"New Kind of Kick"	The Cramps	3:29
7.	"Always Is Always Forever"	Kiernan Shipka, Tati Gabrielle, Adeline Rudolph and Abigail Cowen	0:51
8.	"Black Magic Woman"	VCTRYS	3:08
9.	"Dream a Little Dream"	Pink Martini, The von Trapps, Gus Kahn, Fabian Andre and Wilbur Schwandt	3:53
10.	"Queen Freya Hymnal"	Adeline Rudolph and Abigail Cowen	1:40
11.	"Blest Be the Tie That Binds"	Jaz Sinclair	2:38
12.	"Do-Re-Mi"	Miranda Otto, Tati Gabrielle, Abigail Cowen and Gavin Leatherwood	1:20
13.	"A Little Wicked"	Valerie Broussard	3:28
14.	"Girl U Want"	Devo	2:59
15.	"Gently Break It"	Beck Pete	3:37
16.	"Under the Stars"	Aquamarine	3:33
17.	"Divine Love to Kill Fascism"	Peter Matthew Bauer	5:46
18.	"Lavender Blue (Dilly Dilly)"	Alvina August	1:19
19.	"Masquerade"	Kiernan Shipka, Ross Lynch, Lucy Davis, Jaz Sinclair, Tati Gabrielle, Gavin Leatherwood and Miranda Otto	2:04

Chilling Adventures of Sabrina: Season 1 (Original Television Score)
No.	Title	Artist(s)	Length
1.	"Main Title (Chilling Adventures of Sabrina)"	Adam Taylor	1:39
2.	"Sabrina and Harvey"	Adam Taylor	1:24
3.	"Hello Half Breed"	Adam Taylor	1:14
4.	"I Can't Just Vanish"	Adam Taylor	1:30
5.	"Hello Boys"	Adam Taylor	0:45
6.	"Malum Malice"	Adam Taylor	1:23
7.	"Harvey Looks for a Witchmark"	Adam Taylor	1:52
8.	"Academy of the Dark Arts"	Adam Taylor	1:32
9.	"Madame Satan"	Adam Taylor	0:57
10.	"Flashback at the Mines"	Adam Taylor	1:36
11.	"Astral Projection"	Adam Taylor	0:48
12.	"Secret Bookclub"	Adam Taylor	0:56
13.	"The Acheron"	Adam Taylor	2:09
14.	"Sabrina Tells Harvey Everything"	Adam Taylor	5:54
15.	"The Hunt Begins"	Adam Taylor	0:56
16.	"Blackwood's Twins"	Adam Taylor	0:49
17.	"One Last Kiss"	Adam Taylor	2:25
18.	"Sabrina's Dream of the Birth"	Adam Taylor	1:03
19.	"Sabrina vs. Ambrose"	Adam Taylor	1:30
20.	"The Temptation of Sabrina Spellman"	Adam Taylor	1:02
21.	"Nick Levitates Sabrina"	Adam Taylor	2:16
22.	"Ambrose Kills Aunties and Sabrina"	Adam Taylor	2:16
23.	"The Witch Hunters"	Adam Taylor	2:22
24.	"Sabrina, Sword of Satan"	Adam Taylor	3:48

=== Season 2 ===
Chilling Adventures of Sabrina: Original Television Soundtrack – Part 3
No.	Title	Artist(s)	Length
1.	"My Sharona"	Jaz Sinclair	2:27
2.	"Teenage Dirtbag"	Jaz Sinclair and Lachlan Watson	3:26
3.	"The Song of Purple Summer"	Kiernan Shipka, Miranda Otto, Lucy Davis, Chance Perdomo, Tati Gabrielle, Adeline Rudolph, Abigail Cowen, Tyler Cotton et Emily Haine	3:33
4.	"By the Sea"	Lucy Davis and Alessandro Juliani	1:54
5.	"Hey Mickey"	Kiernan Shipka, Jaz Sinclair and Jasmine Vega	2:09
6.	"Tender Shepherd"	Miranda Otto, Lucy Davis, Chance Perdomo and Tati Gabrielle	1:41

Chilling Adventures of Sabrina: Original Television Soundtrack – Part 4
No.	Title	Artist(s)	Length
1.	"Radio Ga Ga"	Ross Lynch, Jaz Sinclair, Lachlan Watson and Jonathan Whitesell	3:26
2.	"Sixteen Going on Seventeen"	Kiernan Shipka and Gavin Leatherwood	2:58
3.	"Tomorrow Belongs to Me"	Gavin Leatherwood, Tyler Cotton and Mellany Barros	2:22
4.	"Total Eclipse of the Heart"	Kiernan Shipkan, Ross Lynch, Jaz Sinclair and Lachlan Watson	3:05
5.	"PartyTime"	Riker Lynch, Sarah Corrigan, Conor Stinson O'Gorman and Nicco Del Rio	2:20
6.	"Sweet Child O' Mine"	Kiernan Shipka, Gavin Leatherwood, Tati Gabrielle and Chance Perdomo	2:46
7.	"Time Warp"	Ross Lynch, Jaz Sinclair, Lachlan Watson and Jonathan Whitesell	2:46

== Release ==
The first ten episodes of Chilling Adventures of Sabrina were released worldwide on Netflix on October 26, 2018. The same day, the first two episodes were shown in a special screening at Paris Comic-Con 2018. The eleventh episode of the first part, a Christmas special episode, was released on December 14, 2018. The remaining nine episodes of the first season were released on April 5, 2019. The first part of the second season, dubbed Part 3, was released on January 24, 2020. The second part of the second season, also the last part of the series, dubbed Part 4, released on December 31, 2020.

== Reception ==
=== Critical response ===
Critical response of Chilling Adventures of Sabrina
Part	Rotten Tomatoes	Metacritic
1	91% (103 reviews)	74 (28 reviews)
2	81% (43 reviews)	—N/a
3	90% (29 reviews)	—N/a
4	67% (24 reviews)	—N/a

==== Part 1 ====
For the first part of the first season, the review aggregator website Rotten Tomatoes reported a 91% approval rating with an average rating of 7.77/10 based on 103 reviews. The website's consensus reads, "Bewitchingly beautiful and wickedly macabre, Chilling Adventures of Sabrina casts an intoxicating spell and provides a perfect showcase for Kiernan Shipka's magical talents." Metacritic, which uses a weighted average, assigned a score of 74 out of 100 based on 28 critics for the first part of the first season, indicating "generally favorable reviews".

Alicia Lutes of IGN gave Part 1 a 9.2/10, saying that it "shines in its deliciously dark plotlines, volumes of camp, and irreverent and at-times antagonistic humor." Dave Nemetz of TVLine gave Part 1 a "B+" saying that "Sabrina is more tongue-in-cheek and self-aware than Riverdale is ever allowed to be" and that it is "off to a bewitchingly great start." Meagan Navarro from Bloody Disgusting praised Part 1, stating that it is "fun and briskly paced".

Daniel Fienberg from The Hollywood Reporter stated in a review of Part 1, that the "appeal of Sabrina, increasing as the show goes along, comes mostly from Shipka". He praises the actress's performance by mentioning that she is "perfectly cast complement to one of the show's most endearing elements, namely its blurry approach to modernity." Chris Hayner from GameSpot praised Part 1 by highlighting the performances of the cast members. He further complimented the progressive undertones of the series and stated that it "manages to tangle with modern day issues many face, while couching it all in a supernatural world". Constance Grady from Vox praised Part 1, particularly for its cinematography, stating that its "higher production values are apparent in every frame, and the result is gorgeous". She further added that when the series fully commits to its dark goth horror aesthetic, it is at "its most thrilling." Petrana Radulovic from Polygon stated in her positive review of Part 1 that "once the horror kicks in, the season continues with just as much chills and sets the stage for what comes next."

For the Christmas special episode, Rotten Tomatoes reported a 76% approval rating with an average rating of 6.56/10 based on 21 reviews. The website's consensus reads, "This holiday chapter from Sabrina's Chilling Adventures spikes the eggnog with the series' ghoulish sensibility, but viewers may feel disappointed by the special's confusion over whether it is a self-contained diversion or a continuation of the series' core story."

The seventh episode of the first season is particularly controversial for its depiction of a teenage orgy.

==== Part 2 ====
The second part of the first season received an average of 6.88 out of 10 on Rotten Tomatoes, with an overall 81% approval based on 43 reviews. The website's consensus reads, "With a stronger mystery steeped in witchy world-building, Chilling Adventures remains a deliciously dark, delightfully campy romp that pushes Sabrina deeper down the path of night — if only she would get there a little faster."

==== Part 3 ====
Rotten Tomatoes reports that 90% of 29 critic ratings are positive for the Part 3, with an average rating of 7.36/10. The website's critical consensus reads, "A deliciously hellish thrill ride from start to finish, Chilling Adventures of Sabrina just keeps getting better."

==== Part 4 ====
On Rotten Tomatoes, Part 4 has an approval rating of 67% based on reviews from 24 critics, with an average rating of 7.13/10. The website's critical consensus states, "Though it leaves some fan favorites high and dry, Chilling Adventures of Sabrina's final season hits enough emotional highs to serve as a fitting farewell to the Queen of Hell."

=== Accolades ===
Year	Award	Category	Recipient(s)	Result	Ref.
2018	Dorian Awards	Campy TV Show of the Year	Chilling Adventures of Sabrina	Nominated	
2019	Directors Guild of Canada Awards	Outstanding Directorial Achievement in a Family Series	Rachel Talalay (for "Chapter Six: An Exorcism in Greendale")	Won	
2019	Directors Guild of Canada Awards	Best Production Design – Comedy or Family Series	Lisa Soper	Won	
2019	Fangoria Chainsaw Awards	Best Series	Chilling Adventures of Sabrina	Nominated	
2019	Kids' Choice Awards	Favorite TV Drama	Chilling Adventures of Sabrina	Nominated	
2019	Golden Trailer Awards	Best Title/Credit Sequence for a TV/Streaming Series	Chilling Adventures of Sabrina	Won	
2019	Leo Awards	Best Cinematography in a Dramatic Series	Brendan Uegama (for "Chapter Six: An Exorcism In Greendale")	Nominated	
2019	Leo Awards	Best Cinematography in a Dramatic Series	Stephen Maier (for "Chapter Ten: The Witching Hour")	Nominated	
2019	Leo Awards	Best Make-Up in a Dramatic Series	Werner Pretorius, Mike Fields, Shelagh Mcivor, Tom Sosnowski, Geoff Redknap (for "Chapter Five: Dreams in a Witch House")	Nominated	
2019	Leo Awards	Best Guest Performance by a Male in a Dramatic Series	Jason Beaudoin (for "Chapter Six: An Exorcism In Greendale")	Nominated	
2019	MTV Movie & TV Awards	Best Performance in a Show	Kiernan Shipka	Nominated	
2019	Saturn Awards	Best Streaming Horror & Thriller Series	Chilling Adventures of Sabrina	Nominated	
2019	Saturn Awards	Best Actress in a Streaming Presentation	Kiernan Shipka	Nominated	
2019	Teen Choice Awards	Choice Sci-Fi/Fantasy TV Show	Chilling Adventures of Sabrina	Nominated	
2019	Teen Choice Awards	Choice Sci-Fi/Fantasy TV Actor	Ross Lynch	Nominated	
2019	Teen Choice Awards	Choice Sci-Fi/Fantasy TV Actress	Kiernan Shipka	Nominated	
2020	Directors Guild of Canada Awards	Outstanding Achievement in Production Design - Comedy or Family Series	Lisa Soper (for "Chapter Twenty-Three: Heavy Is the Crown")	Won	

== Future and continuation ==
Following the series's cancellation, Kiernan Shipka reprised her role as Sabrina in the episode "Chapter Ninety-Nine: The Witching Hour(s)" from the sixth season of Riverdale. The episode is set in an alternative universe called Rivervale where Sabrina is called by Cheryl Blossom (Madelaine Petsch) to help her with a spell. Shipka also reprised the role in "Chapter One Hundred and Fourteen: The Witches of Riverdale" in the same season, an episode set in the original continuity of the two series and after the events of Chilling Adventures of Sabrina. The episode provides closure to plot points from the series. Nicholas Scratch also appeared in the episode, portrayed by Cole Sprouse, following a temporary resurrection spell used on Jughead Jones's body.

In July 2021, it was announced that the third season would be published as the comic book sequel series The Occult World of Sabrina, but this didn't take place. The first arc of the series would have finished the "World Without Sabrina" storyline that began at the end of the series finale.
