= Before I Fall (film) =

2017 American teen drama film

- Theatrical release poster
- Directed by: Ry Russo-Young
- Screenplay by: Maria Maggenti; Gina Prince-Bythewood
- Based on: Before I Fall by Lauren Oliver
- Produced by: Matthew Kaplan; Brian Robbins; Jonathan Shestack
- Starring: Zoey Deutch; Halston Sage; Logan Miller; Kian Lawley; Elena Kampouris; Diego Boneta; Jennifer Beals
- Cinematography: Michael Fimognari
- Edited by: Joe Landauer
- Music by: Adam Taylor
- Production companies: Awesomeness Films; Jon Shestack Productions
- Distributed by: Open Road Films
- Release dates: January 21, 2017 (Sundance); March 3, 2017 (United States)
- Running time: 99 minutes
- Country: United States
- Language: English
- Budget: $5 million
- Box office: $18.9 million

Before I Fall is a 2017 American teen drama film directed by Ry Russo-Young and written by Maria Maggenti and Gina Prince-Bythewood, based on the 2010 novel of the same name by Lauren Oliver. The film stars Zoey Deutch, Halston Sage, Logan Miller, Kian Lawley, Elena Kampouris, Diego Boneta, and Jennifer Beals.

The film had its world premiere at the Sundance Film Festival on January 21, 2017, and was theatrically released on March 3, 2017, by Open Road Films. It received mixed reviews from critics and grossed $18 million worldwide against its $5 million budget.

== Plot ==
Samantha "Sam" Kingston awakens on February 12, known as Cupid's day. She is picked up by her friends Lindsay, Ally, and Elody, who are excited about Sam's plans to lose her virginity to her boyfriend Rob that night.

During a class lecture on Sisyphus, students distribute roses. Sam receives one from Rob and another from a boy named Kent McFuller, a former grade school friend who is in love with her. Kent invites her to a party at his house, but she is unenthusiastic. During lunch, the girls make fun of Juliet Sykes, an outsider whom they view as a "psycho".

At the party, Lindsay confronts Juliet and the two fight, resulting in many of the guests dousing Juliet with beer. Humiliated, Juliet leaves in tears. As Sam and her friends are driving home, the car crashes, apparently killing them.

Sam wakes in her room on Cupid's Day again. Assuming the previous day was just a nightmare, Sam continues on with her day but finds that similar events occur, culminating in a car crash again.

Sam wakes up on the same day again. Realizing she is in a time loop, she convinces the group to have a sleepover instead of going to the party. They avoid the crash, but discover later in the night that Juliet committed suicide that day. Sam also learns that Lindsay and Juliet were once best friends.

As the time loop continues, Sam realizes that nothing she does matters. She starts airing her grievances with people, then attempts to spend more quality time with the ones she loves. She also attempts to make amends with Anna Cartullo, a student she had bullied, and becomes closer to Kent, who comforts her after an unsatisfying first sexual experience with Rob.

In another loop, at the party, Kent recalls that Sam once defended him from a bully after his father died, after which he resolved to one day be her hero. They share a kiss.

Sam hears the fight between Lindsay and Juliet from the hall and chases the latter through the woods. Juliet reveals that Lindsay's stress from her parents' constant fighting before their divorce caused her to start wetting her bed. When the two were on a camping trip, Lindsay wet her sleeping bag, but blamed Juliet and has been bullying her ever since. Juliet later commits suicide by running in front of Lindsay's car, and making Sam realize that it was Juliet who they hit on the original day.

Sam wakes up again with a sense of calm and understanding, knowing what she must do to end the loop. She resolves to be kind and considerate as she goes about her day. She sends roses to both Juliet and Kent, breaks up with Rob, and tells her friends why she loves them.

At the party, she kisses Kent and tells him she loves him. When Juliet attempts to run into traffic, Sam pushes her out of the way at the last second and is hit by a truck. As she dies, Sam remembers all her positive memories. Her ghost sees Juliet standing over her body saying that Sam saved her, but Sam states, "No. You saved me."

== Cast ==
- Zoey Deutch as Samantha Kingston
- Halston Sage as Lindsay Edgecombe
- Logan Miller as Kent McFuller
- Kian Lawley as Rob Cokran
- Elena Kampouris as Juliet Sykes
- Diego Boneta as Mr. Daimler
- Jennifer Beals as Mrs. Kingston, Samantha and Izzy's mother
- Cynthy Wu as Ally Harris
- Medalion Rahimi as Elody
- Liv Hewson as Anna Cartullo
- Nicholas Lea as Dan Kingston, Samantha and Izzy's father
- Erica Tremblay as Izzy Kingston, Samantha's sister
- Claire Corlett as Devil Cupid
- Roan Curtis as Marian Sykes

== Production ==
On July 15, 2010, Fox 2000 Pictures bought the feature film rights to the teen novel Before I Fall, Lauren Oliver's debut, which was published that year. Maria Maggenti was hired to adapt the novel into a screenplay, while Jonathan Shestack was set to produce and Ginny Pennekamp to co-produce. The film is about a high school student who re-lives the same day until she gets everything in her life right. In 2011, the script was listed among the Black List of best unproduced screenplays. In 2012, Gina Prince-Bythewood was attached to direct, but nothing materialized. Ry Russo-Young was attached as the film's director. On September 15, 2015, it was announced that Zoey Deutch had been cast in the film's lead role, Samantha Kingston. Brian Robbins and Matthew Kaplan produced the film through their Awesomeness Films, along with Shestack, with production starting in late October 2015. On October 27, 2015, more cast was announced, consisting of Halston Sage, Logan Miller, Kian Lawley, Diego Boneta, and Elena Kampouris. Good Universe handled the film's international sales at the American Film Market. On November 3, 2015, Jennifer Beals joined the film's cast, to play Samantha's mother. On November 20, 2015, Liv Hewson was cast in the film to play Anna Cartullo. Adam Taylor composed the film's score.

=== Filming ===
Principal photography on the film began on November 16, 2015, in Squamish, British Columbia, where they filmed at Quest University. Shooting also took place in and around Vancouver. Filming ended on December 19, 2015.

== Release ==
In May 2016, Open Road Films acquired U.S. distribution rights to the film. Before I Fall had its world premiere at the Sundance Film Festival on January 21, 2017. The film was originally scheduled to be released on April 7, 2017, but was moved up to March 3. It also screened in Italy at Giffoni Film Festival on July 18, 2017.

=== Home media ===
The film was released on DVD and Blu-ray on May 30, 2017, in the United States by Universal Pictures Home Entertainment.

== Reception ==
=== Box office ===
Before I Fall made $12.2 million in the United States and Canada and $6.7 million in other territories for a worldwide gross of $18.9 million.

In the United States and Canada, Before I Fall opened alongside The Shack and Logan, and was projected to gross around $4 million in its opening weekend. It ended up opening to $4.69 million. In its second weekend the film grossed $3.1 million, dropping just 34% and again finishing 6th at the box office.

=== Critical response ===
On Rotten Tomatoes, the film holds an approval rating of 64% based on 124 reviews, with an average rating of 5.9/10. The site's critical consensus reads, "Before I Fall's familiar ingredients are enlivened by a fresh YA perspective and a strong performance from emerging star Zoey Deutch." On Metacritic, the film has a score of 58 out of 100, based on 31 critics, indicating "mixed or average" reviews. Audiences polled by CinemaScore gave the film an average grade of "B" on an A+ to F scale, while PostTrak reported filmgoers gave a 72% overall positive score.

Abbey Bender of Uproxx gave the film a generally positive review and praised Ry Russo-Young's direction. She disliked the ending but noted "along the way, though, there are plenty of scenes of compellingly lush nature and teenage girlhood." AllMovie gave it 2.5 stars out of 5, while Susan Wloszczyna of RogerEbert.com gave it 3 out of 4.

== Awards and nominations ==
The film earned a nomination in 2017 Teen Choice Awards Choice Movie: Drama category, and the cast also earned nominations: Zoey Deutch in the 2017 Teen Choice Awards Choice Movie: Drama Actress category and Kian Lawley in the Choice Movie: Drama Actor category for the movie. Lawley went on to win the award.

== See also ==
- List of films featuring time loops
