= Before I Fall =

2010 young adult novel by Lauren Oliver

- First edition
- Author: Lauren Oliver
- Language: English
- Genre: Young adult
- Publisher: HarperCollins
- Publication date: February 14, 2010
- Publication place: United States
- Media type: Print (Hardback)
- Pages: 480
- ISBN: 9780061726804

Before I Fall is a 2010 young adult novel written by the American author Lauren Oliver. The novel is written in the first-person perspective of a teenage girl, Samantha Kingston, who is forced to relive the day of her death every day for a week. In an effort to understand why that happens to her, Samantha undertakes new actions each day, some of which are out of character and surprise her family and friends.

The book is the basis for the film of the same name that was released on March 3, 2017.

== Plot ==
Popular 17-year-old Samantha "Sam" Kingston awakens on February 12, known as "Cupid's Day." That night, Sam and her three best friends Ally, Elody, and Lindsay attend the party of Kent McFuller, an unpopular boy who used to be Sam's best friend and has romantic feelings for her. Sam plans to lose her virginity to her boyfriend, Rob, but finds him intoxicated. Juliet Sykes, a girl bullied by Sam and her best friends since elementary school, is also in attendance and confronts the three. When she insults them, they retaliate by pouring beer on her. A humiliated Juliet runs out of the house.

At 12:39 AM, while Sam and her friends are driving home, the vehicle veers off the road and crashes into a tree. Sam is killed instantaneously.

The next morning, Sam wakes up and finds that it is once again February 12 - the day has magically restarted. She goes through the day in a confused fog, watching as the events of the previous day repeat themselves. Upon driving home, Sam warns Lindsay, who is driving, to be careful. Lindsay dismisses her, and Sam watches nervously as the clock turns to 12:39. They crash, and she dies just like the previous day.

Sam wakes up on February 12 again, but feigns an illness and arrives to school late. Now aware that she is reliving the same day, she does things differently to learn things about various acquaintances and peers. That night, Sam convinces her friends to ditch Kent's party and have a sleepover instead. The girls wake up in the middle of the night to the news that Juliet has committed suicide by shooting herself.

Elody and Ally express remorse for their treatment of Juliet over the years, while Lindsay, who was the primary orchestrator of the bullying, seems indifferent. Elody and Ally, disgusted with Lindsay, leave the basement to sleep upstairs. Sam goes through Lindsay's things and learns that Lindsay and Juliet were best friends when they were little, but their friendship abruptly ended in fifth grade before Lindsay started harassing Juliet.

The next day, Sam awakens furious about the previous day's events. She dresses in a skimpy outfit with the word "slut" written on it, argues with her parents before school, and insults all of her friends, effectively ending their friendship and enraging Lindsay, who ousts Sam from the car and leaves her to walk to school. In calculus class, Sam brazenly flirts with her perverted teacher, Mr. Daimler. After he dismisses the class, they kiss, but Sam finds the experience uncomfortable and disgusting.

Now socially isolated, Sam flees to an abandoned bathroom during lunch and finds Anna Cartullo, another one of Lindsay's victims. The girls have a transparent discussion about why Sam and her friends have bullied Anna. In a gesture of solidarity, they end up trading footwear for the remainder of the day. As Anna leaves the bathroom to hang out with a boy, Alex, who is cheating on his girlfriend with Anna, Sam tells Anna that she deserves better than Alex.

When Juliet enters the party that night, Sam, desperate for a distraction, leads a drunken Rob to an empty bedroom with the intent to have sex. However, Rob falls asleep before they can do anything. Sam quickly puts her clothes back on, stumbles into a barred-off section of Kent's house, and breaks down. Kent overhears her sobbing, then comforts her and puts her to bed. Sam realizes that she has feelings for Kent, but drifts to sleep and the day resets.

Sam wakes up in her own room on the fifth morning of February 12 and makes a bucket list. She ditches school to spend the day at home with her 8-year-old sister, Izzy, and bonds with her. That night, she goes out to dinner with her family and meets Juliet's younger sister, Marian. Sam begs Marian to tell Juliet "not to do it." Marian says that she will tell Juliet tomorrow. Understanding there will never be a tomorrow, Sam returns to her table, defeated.

Later that night, she sneaks out of the house to go to Kent's party, but stops at Juliet's house on the way. She meets Juliet's mother and learns that Juliet's father is an alcoholic, leaving the entire family in shambles. Sam goes to Kent's party, finding Juliet already there and in the midst of her confrontation with Sam's friends. Juliet runs into the woods. Sam chases after her and finds her standing by the highway. She attempts to dissuade her, but Juliet feels past the point of saving and runs into the road.

Juliet is struck and killed by Lindsay's car, which veers off the road and into a tree. Ally and Lindsay are unharmed, but Elody, who is sitting in the front passenger seat, is killed. Sam finally realizes that the initial car crash was caused by Juliet running in front of Lindsay's car.

Kent escorts Sam home and puts her to bed. Before Sam falls asleep, she asks why he is being so nice to her. He replies that when they were little, Sam defended him from a bully when he was crying because his grandfather had died. He kisses her before she falls asleep.

The next day, Sam resolves to make amends with those she has hurt, though this breeds disastrous results. Sam sends a dozen flowers to Juliet from a "secret admirer," though Juliet interprets the gesture as a taunt rather than a compliment. Sam enacts revenge on certain people, such as embarrassing Rob at Kent's party and revealing to Alex's girlfriend that he's cheating on her. She has a long talk with Juliet in the bathroom before Juliet confronts Lindsay, Ally, and Elody. Sam again fails to get through to Juliet, who fatally runs into oncoming traffic a second time.

Sam drives Lindsay home after Juliet's death. Lindsay seems defeated, and Sam realizes that Lindsay is far less fearless than she portrays herself to be. Kent gives Sam a ride home, and they kiss before the day resets again.

On the seventh and last day, Sam, now knowing what she must do to end the loop, tells her family she loves them and gives her grandmother's necklace to Izzy. She compliments her friends, sends a single rose to both Juliet and Kent, and interrupts Anna and Alex's date to gift Anna a book. She arrives early to calculus to berate Mr. Daimler for being a predator before her classmates arrive. She then breaks up with Rob.

When it is time for the party, Sam ensures that Lindsay does not drive herself. Sam instead gets picked up by Kent, and they kiss in the car before she abruptly leaves. Suspicious, he tries to stop her to no avail.

Sam again tries to stop Juliet from killing herself again, but is unable to in the limited time she has. When Juliet runs onto the highway, Sam pushes her out of the way and is struck by a van. Juliet stands above her and asks, "You saved me. Why did you save me?" A fatally wounded Sam thinks, "No. The opposite."

== Film adaptation ==
Fox 2000 optioned the rights for Before I Fall in mid-2010, with Maria Maggenti named as the writer, and Jon Shestack named as a producer soon after. Ry Russo-Young was hired to direct. In 2015, Awesomness TV came on board to the produce the film. In September 2015, it was announced that Zoey Deutch had been cast as the lead. In October, Halston Sage was cast, along with actor Logan Miller and YouTube star Kian Lawley. Later that same month, Scream Queens star Diego Boneta and actress Elena Kampouris were also announced as part of the cast.

The film had its world premiere at the Sundance Film Festival on January 21, 2017, and was theatrically released on March 3, 2017, by Open Road Films.

== Reception ==
Reviews for Before I Fall have been positive, with RT Book Reviews giving the book 4 1/2 stars and nominating it for their 2010 "Best Young Adult Paranormal/Fantasy Novel". Kirkus Reviews described the novel as "unexpectedly rich". The School Library Journal wrote that although the book was "somewhat predictable, the plot drives forward and teens will want to see where Sam's choices lead".

== See also ==
- Time loops
- Butterfly effect
- Groundhog Day (film)
- Russian Doll (TV series)
- Palm Springs (2020 film)
- The Obituary of Tunde Johnson
