= Marvin Matyka =

German music producer (born 1997)

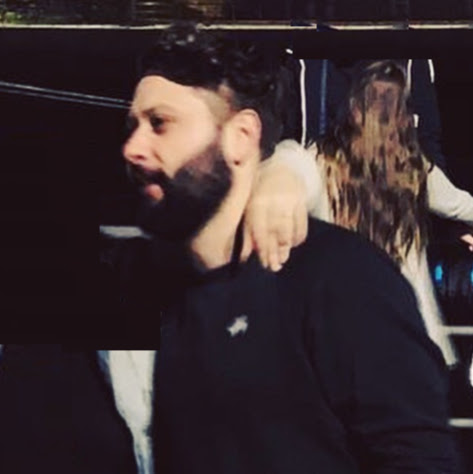
Matyka, 2019

Marvin Steve Matyka (born 26 June 1997 in Hamburg) is a German music producer, editor and soundtrack creator.

== Selected filmography ==
- Riverdale (American TV series)
- 13 Reasons Why
- Chilling Adventures of Sabrina (TV series)
