= Akio Otsuka =

Japanese actor and narrator (born 1959)

- 大塚 明夫
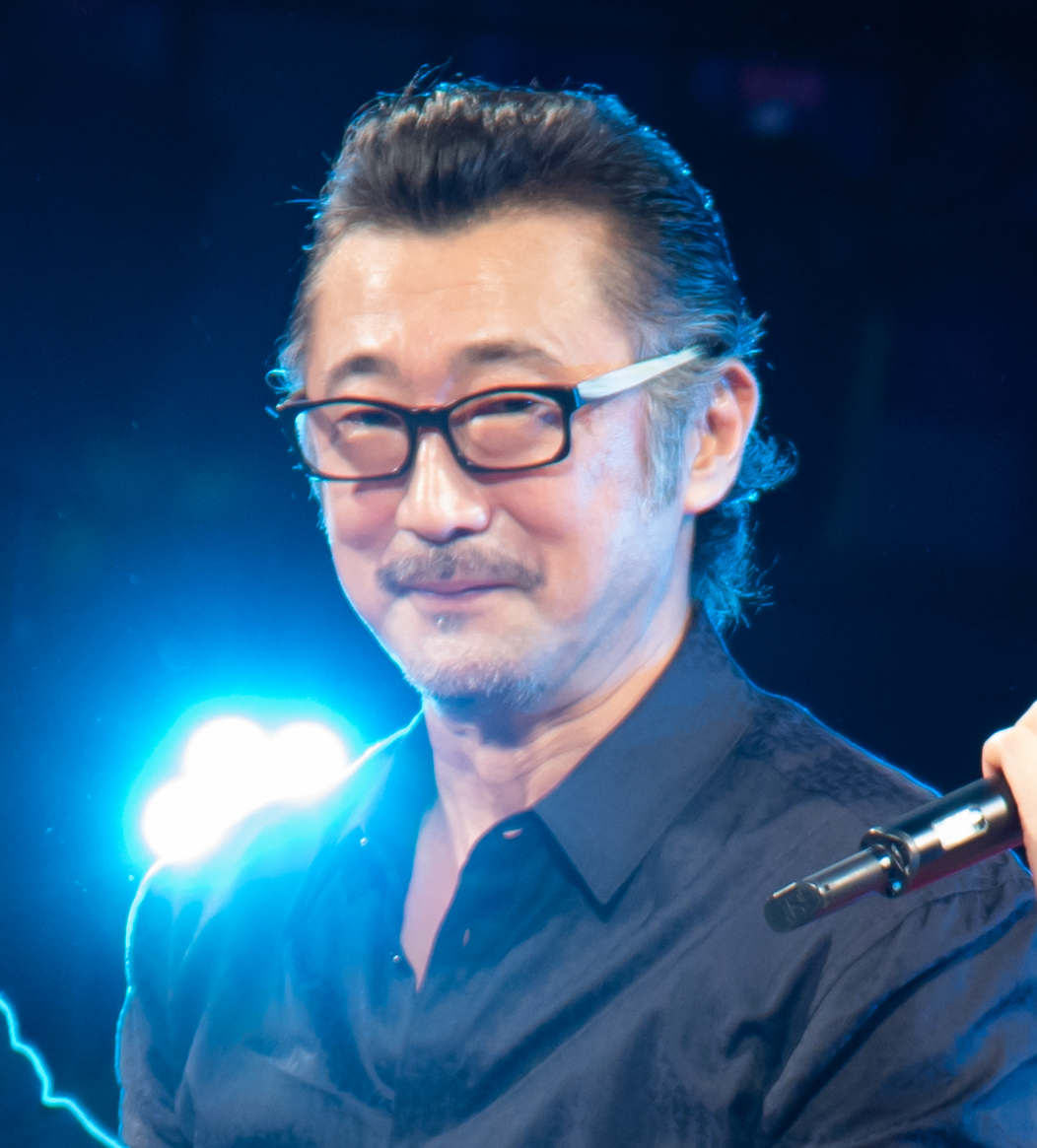
- Otsuka in 2018
- Born: November 24, 1959 (age 66); Tokyo, Japan
- Occupations: Actor; voice actor; narrator
- Years active: 1988–present
- Agent: Topone
- Spouse: Yōko Soumi (m. 2005; div. 2009)
- Parent: Chikao Ōtsuka (father)
- Website: Official website

Akio Otsuka (大塚 明夫, Ōtsuka Akio; born November 24, 1959) is a Japanese actor, voice actor, and narrator from the Tokyo Metropolitan area. He is currently a freelancer and was previously affiliated with Mausu Promotion.

His deep voice has landed him many roles in films, dubbing, animation, and video games. He is most known for his voice roles as Jigen Daisuke in Lupin III, the titular protagonist in Black Jack, Solid Snake, Naked Snake, Solidus Snake, and Venom Snake in the Metal Gear series, Gamigami Devil in Popolocrois, Ryoma Hoshi in Danganronpa V3: Killing Harmony, Shunsui Kyouraku in Bleach, Lieutenant Garuru in Sgt. Frog, Gwendel von Voltaire in Kyo Kara Maoh!, Batou in Ghost in the Shell, Blackbeard in One Piece, Tadakatsu Honda in the Samurai Warriors and Warriors Orochi series, Sango and Jugo Yokomizo in Detective Conan, Bryan Hawk in Hajime no Ippo, Zen Shigaraki/All For One in My Hero Academia, Thorkell in Vinland Saga, Wamuu in JoJo's Bizarre Adventure, Anavel Gato in Mobile Suit Gundam 0083: Stardust Memory, and Xehanort in the Kingdom Hearts series.

He is also the official Japanese dubbing voice for many Western actors, including Steven Seagal, Nicolas Cage, Antonio Banderas, Dolph Lundgren, Samuel L. Jackson, Denzel Washington, and Dennis Quaid.

Mausu Promotion announced on January 7, 2017, that Otsuka had married someone outside of the voice acting industry.

On March 31, 2026, Mausu Promotion announced that Otsuka had left the agency to become an independent voice actor.

== Early life ==
Akio was born as the eldest son of Chikao Ōtsuka, who was renowned for voicing Nezumi Otoko in GeGeGe no Kitarō and for providing the dubbing voice of Charles Bronson. Masako Nozawa recalled that she used to change Akio's diapers when he was a baby. Kiyoshi Kobayashi also knew Akio during his childhood and affectionately called him "Akio-chan." The two would later co-star together in Mobile Suit Gundam 0083: Stardust Memory. Furthermore, in 2021, the role of Daisuke Jigen in the Lupin the Third franchise was passed on from Kobayashi to Akio.

== Stage ==
Year	Title	Role	Notes	Ref.
2024, 2026	Thanatos	Inspector David Swain		

== Filmography ==
=== Television animation ===
Year	Title	Role	Notes	Ref.
1988	F	Gorou		
1989	Mobile Police Patlabor	Gomioka, Kataoka		
1989	Jungle Book: Shounen Mowgli	Sander		
1989	Alfred J. Kwak	Franz Ferdinand, Ring Master		
1989	Magical Hat	Gord Baboon		
1990	NG Knight Ramune & 40	Yorurun		
1990	Karakuri Kengo Den Musashi Lord	Shutentaiga		
1990	Tanoshii Moomin Ikka	Moominpappa		
1990	Nadia the Secret of Blue Water	Captain Nemo		
1991	Anime Himitsu no Hanazono	Hawkins		
1991	Kinkyuu Hasshin Saver Kids	Rasuto		
1991	Lupin the 3rd: Napoleon's Dictionary	Makkaramu		
1992	Aah! Harimanada	Harimanada Isao		
1992	Ashita e Free Kick	Juliano		
1992	Anime Himitsu no Hanazono	Hawkins		
1992	Yōyō no Neko Tsumami	Yo Yo		
1992	Lupin III: From Russia With Love	Donbino		
1994	Soreike! Anpanman	Naganegiman / Negi-ojisan		
1994	Tottemo! Luckyman	Saikyou-Danshaku		
1994	Blue Seed	Daitetsu Kunikida		
1994	Magic Knight Rayearth	Wind God Windham		
1994	Mahoujin Guru Guru	Fairy Saiko		
1994	Montana Jones	Montana Jones		
1994	Shippu! Iron Leaguer Rebooted	Thirteen		
1995	Saint Tail	Detective Asuka / Asuka Sr.		
1995	Mobile Suit Gundam Wing	Narrator, Vice Foreign Minister Darlian		
1995	Street Fighter II V	Barrack, Narrator		
1995	Tōma Kishinden ONI	Takiyasha		
1995	Ninku	Shigure Ninku		
1995	Virtua Fighter	Van Kuur		
1996	Martian Successor Nadesico	Kouichiro Misumaru		
1996	City Hunter: The Secret Service	McGuire		
1996	Shōnen Santa no Daibōken	Luke, Rye		
1996	The Vision of Escaflowne	Goau		
1996	Detective Conan	Juugo Yokomizo		
1996	Rurouni Kenshin: Meiji Swordsman Romantic Story	Udō Jin-e		
1997	Vampire Princess Miyu	Black Kite, Ohshima		
1997	Clamp School	Brother in Law		
1997	Cooking Master Boy	Chou Yu		
1997	In The Beginning: The Bible Stories	Young Ezekiel		
1997	Hyper Police	Batanen Fujioka		
1997	Hakugei: Legend of the Moby Dick	Ahab		
1997	Flame of Recca	Kai		
1998	Steam Detectives	Night Phantom		
1998	Cowboy Bebop	Whitney Hagas Matsumoto		
1998	Silent Möbius	Razan Namigumo		
1998	Kurogane Communication	Honi		
1998	Trigun	Rai-Dei the Blade		
1998	Neo Ranga	Shogo Haseoka		
1998	Legend of Basara	Khazan		
1999	Puppet Master Sakon	Katsumi Oki		
1999	Power Stone	Vargas		
1999	Monster Farm	Captain Jim		
2000	Ghost Stories	Ouma		
2000	Kindaichi Shounen no Jikenbo	Leo Horinouchi		
2000	Sci-Fi Harry	Mick		
2000	Banner of the Stars	Samson		
2000	One Piece	Captain Joke		
2001	Cyborg 009: The Cyborg Soldier	Cyborg 005/G. Junior		
2001	Banner of the Stars II	Samson		
2001	Touch: Cross Road – Kaze no Yukue	Fujimura		
2001	Lupin III: Alcatraz Connection	Andy		
2002	Asobotto Senki Goku	GK		
2002	Ghost in the Shell: Stand Alone Complex	Batou		
2002	Shin Megami Tensei Devil Children: Light & Dark	Watcher		
2002	Tenchi Muyo! GXP	Azusa Masaki Jurai		
2002	Patapata Hikōsen no Bōken	Christophe Balzac		
2002	Piano	Seiji Nomura		
2002	Petite Princess Yucie	Rockwell		
2002	Full Metal Panic!	Lt. Cmdr. Andrei Kalinin		
2003	Ashita no Nadja	Jose Rodriguez		
2003	Astro Boy: Mighty Atom	Pluto		
2003	Wolf's Rain	Cold Fireman		
2003	L/R: Licensed by Royalty	Mister		
2003	Requiem from the Darkness	Choujirou		
2003	The Galaxy Railways	Schwanhelt Bulge		
2003	Stratos 4	Inquisitor		
2003	Full Metal Panic? Fumoffu	Andrei Kalinin		
2003	PoPoLoCrois	Pietro, Gamigami		
2003	One Piece	Blackbeard		
2004	Agatha Christie no Meitantei Poirot to Marple	Cedric Crackenthorpe		
2004	Super Robot Monkey Team Hyperforce Go!	Skeleton King		
2004	SD Gundam Force	Professor Gerbera		
2004	Kyo kara Maoh!	Gwendal von Voltaire		
2004	Kurau: Phantom Memory	Ayaka's Father		
2004	Ghost in the Shell: Stand Alone Complex 2nd GIG	Batou		
2004	Cromartie High School	Narrator in Episode 25		
2004	Samurai Champloo	Okuru		
2004	Burn-Up Scramble	Master		
2004	Black Jack	Black Jack		
2004	Massugu ni Ikō	Minamoto		
2004	Monster	Milan Kolasch		
2004	Phoenix	Patriarch		
2005	Bleach	Shunsui Kyōraku		
2005	Full Metal Panic! The Second Raid	Andrei Kalinin		
2005	The Snow Queen	The Devil/The Avatar of the Wind		
2006	Ginga Tetsudo Monogatari: Eien e no Bunkiten	Schwanhelt Bulge		
2006	Sgt. Frog	Garuru		
2006	Coyote Ragtime Show	Mister		
2006	Onegai My Melody	Kuromi's Father, Teacher, Mr. Goat		
2006	Kenichi: The Mightiest Disciple	Ishinsai Ogata		
2006	The Melancholy of Haruhi Suzumiya	Arakawa		
2006	A Spirit of The Sun	Yang		
2006	Black Jack 21	Black Jack		
2006	Ray the Animation	B.J		
2007	El Cazador de la Bruja	Sanchez		
2007	Emily of New Moon	Mr. Carpenter		
2007	Gintama	Saizou		
2007	The Skull Man	Sirks 05		
2007	Devil May Cry	Morrison		
2007	Neuro: Supernatural Detective	Masakage Shirota		
2008	Itazura na Kiss	Sudou-senpai		
2008	Ultraviolet: Code 044	Sakuza		
2008	Kyo kara Maoh! 3rd Series	Gwendal		
2008	Gegege no Kitarō	Goro Minamoto		
2008	Slayers Revolution	Wizer		
2008	Naruto: Shippuuden	Chiriku		
2009	Canaan	Sham		
2009	Kawa no Hikari	Glen		
2009	Guin Saga	Cameron		
2009	Jungle Emperor – Yuki ga Mirai wo Kaeru	Ooyama Kenzou		
2009	Valkyria Chronicles	Radi Jaeger		
2009	Hajime no Ippo: New Challenger	Bryan Hawk		
2010	Durarara!!	Shingen Kishitani		
2010	Transformers Animated	Lockdown		
2010	Baka to Test to Shokanju	Sōichi Nishimura		
2011	Baka to Test to Shōkanjū Ni!	Sōichi Nishimura		
2011	Fate/Zero	Rider/Iskandar		
2011	Blade	Blade		
2012	Space Brothers	Brian Jay		
2012	Thermae Romae	Hadrianus		
2012	Toriko	Ryoutei		
2012	Hunter × Hunter (2011)	Uvogin		
2012	Fate/Zero 2	Rider/Iskandar		
2012	JoJo's Bizarre Adventure	Wamuu		
2013	Star Blazers 2199	General Elk Domel		
2013	JoJo's Bizarre Adventure	Wamuu		
2013	Toriko	Livebearer		
2013	Yondemasu yo, Azazel-san. Z	Marukome		
2014	In Search of the Lost Future	Sakunoshin Honjō		
2014	Space Dandy	Toaster		
2014	Sengoku Musou SP: Sanada no Shou	Honda Tadakatsu		
2014	Hajime no Ippo Rising	Brian Hawk		
2014	Hunter × Hunter (2011)	Mizaistom Nana		
2014	Majin Bone	Higashio		
2015	Blood Blockade Battlefront	Blitz T. Abrams		
2015	Sengoku Musou	Honda Tadakatsu		
2015	Durarara!!×2 Shō	Shingen Kishitani		
2015	Nintama Rantaro	Yamada Denzo		
2015	The Rolling Girls	Dandy		
2015	Young Black Jack	Narrator		
2016	Ace Attorney	Go Karuma		
2016	Mob Psycho 100	Ekubo		
2016	My Hero Academia	Zen Shigaraki		
2016	Berserk	Skull Knight		
2016	Magic Kyun! Renaissance	Principal		
2016	March Comes in Like a Lion	Raidō Fujimoto		
2017	Chain Chronicle ~The Light of Haecceitas~	Black King		
2017	Alice to Zouroku	Zouroku Kashimura		
2017	My Hero Academia Season 2	Zen Shigaraki		
2018	Space Battleship Tiramisu	Narrator		
2018	Golden Kamuy	Tetsuzō Nihei		
2018	Laid-Back Camp	Narrator, Rin's Grandfather		
2018	How Not to Summon a Demon Lord	Chester Ray Galford		
2018	Shinya! Tensai Bakabon	Black Jack		
2018	My Hero Academia Season 3	Zen Shigaraki		
2018	Mr. Tonegawa: Middle Management Blues	Masayasu Honda		
2018	Karakuri Circus	Zenji Saiga		
2019	Dororo	Dr. Jukai		
2019	Mob Psycho 100 II	Ekubo		
2019	Carole & Tuesday	Gus Goldman		
2019	Are You Lost?	Jōichi Onishima		
2019	The Case Files of Lord El-Melloi II	Iskandar	Episode 13	
2019	Vinland Saga	Thorkell		
2019	Star Twinkle PreCure	Yoichi Hoshina		
2019	African Office Worker	Lion		
2019	Super Shiro	Shiro (Hero)		
2019	Beastars	Gouhin		
2019	My Hero Academia Season 4	Zen Shigaraki		
2019	Psycho-Pass 3	Tenma Todoroki		
2020	Kakushigoto	Kairi Imashigata		
2020	Ghost in the Shell: SAC 2045	Batou		
2020	Baki	Yujiro Hanma		
2020	The Misfit of Demon King Academy	Jerga		
2020	Akudama Drive	Capital Punishment Division's Instructor		
2020	Boruto: Naruto Next Generations	Amado		
2021	I-Chu: Halfway Through the Idol	Principal Bear		
2021	My Hero Academia Season 5	Zen Shigaraki		
2021	Cestvs: The Roman Fighter	Narrator		
2021	Ore, Tsushima	Tsushima		
2021	How Not to Summon a Demon Lord Ω	Chester Ray Galford		
2021	Kimi to Fit Boxing	Bernardo		
2021	Lupin the 3rd Part 6	Daisuke Jigen		
2021	My Senpai Is Annoying	Ojii-chan		
2022	Girls' Frontline	Kryuger		
2022	The Genius Prince's Guide to Raising a Nation Out of Debt	Gruer		
2022	Summer Time Rendering	Seidō Hishigata		
2022	My Hero Academia Season 6	Zen Shigaraki		
2022	Spy × Family	WISE Director		
2022	Mamekichi Mameko NEET no Nichijō	Narrator		
2022	Mob Psycho 100 III	Ekubo		
2022	Bleach: Thousand-Year Blood War	Shunsui Kyōraku		
2022	Kingdom	Gai Mou		
2023	Bungo Stray Dogs 4	Genichirō Fukuchi		
2023	Revenger	Kanō Gerald		
2023	Vinland Saga Season 2	Thorkell		
2023	My Home Hero	Kubo		
2023	Yohane the Parhelion: Sunshine in the Mirror	Mari's father	Episode 5	
2023	YouTuNya	Narrator		
2023	The Great Cleric	Brod		
2023	Malevolent Spirits: Mononogatari	Kushige		
2023	Shangri-La Frontier	Vysache		
2023	Four Knights of the Apocalypse	Varghese		
2024	Ishura	Hargent the Silencer		
2024	Pon no Michi	Chonbo		
2024	The Fable	Takeshi Ebihara		
2024	My Hero Academia Season 7	Zen Shigaraki		
2024	Dungeon People	Brans		
2024	Kinnikuman: Perfect Origin Arc	Strong the Budo		
2024	Wistoria: Wand and Sword	Logwell		
2024	Let This Grieving Soul Retire!	Gark Welter		
2024	Ranma ½	Sōun Tendō		
2024	Tono to Inu	Tono		
2025	From Bureaucrat to Villainess: Dad's Been Reincarnated!	Leopold Auvergne		
2025	Headhunted to Another World: From Salaryman to Big Four!	Demon King		
2025	Lazarus	Abel		
2025	My Hero Academia: Final Season	Zen Shigaraki		
2025	Gachiakuta	Bundus		
2026	Digimon Beatbreak	Chairman Wong		
2026	The Darwin Incident	Rivera Feyerabend		
2026	The Daughter of the Demon Lord Is Too Kind!	Ahriman		
2026	Hell Mode	Zenoff		
2026	Akane-banashi	Issho Arakawa		
2026	Rooster Fighter	Keizan		
2026	The Ghost in the Shell	Colonel Malles		
2026	The Vermilion Mask	Mask of the Warrior God		
2026	The Laid-Off Cheat-Granting Mage Enjoys a Second Lease on Life	Right head of the Radiant Dragon		
2027	Shin Oishinbo	Yūzan Kaibara		
TBA	Heir to a Monstermancer	Ao		

=== OVA ===
Year	Title	Role	Notes
1989	Angel Cop	Hacker	
1991	3×3 Eyes	Benares	
1991	Mobile Suit Gundam 0083: Stardust Memory	Anavel Gato	
1992	Babel II	Yomi	
1992	Matchless Raijin-Oh	Gokudo	
1993	Black Jack: Clinical Chart	Black Jack	
1994	Kizuna: Bonds of Love	Masanori Araki	
1995	Tenchi Muyo! Ryo-Ohki	Azusa Jurai	
1995	Fire Emblem: Mystery of the Emblem	King Cornelius、Voice-over	
1996	Birdy the Mighty	Gomez	
1996	Blue Seed 2	Daitetsu Kunikida	
1996	Magic User's Club	Minowa Minoru	
1997	Agent Aika	Gozo Aida	
1997	Magic Knight Rayearth	Windom	
1997	Night Warriors: Darkstalkers' Revenge	Demitri Maximoff	
1998	Tekken: The Motion Picture	Jack 2/Narrator	
2000	Amon: Apocalypse of Devilman	Amon	
2001	Rurouni Kenshin: Reflection	Kurogasa	
2005	Saint Seiya	Hades	
2007	Fist of the North Star: Legend of Yuria	Souther	
2009	Dogs: Bullets & Carnage	Mihai	
2010	Tales of Symphonia OVA	Regal Bryant	
2015	Mobile Suit Gundam: The Origin	Narrator	

=== ONA ===
Year	Title	Role	Notes
2016	Pokémon Generations	Giovanni	
2021	The Heike Story	Benkei	
2022	Spriggan	Steve H. Foster	
2023	Make My Day	Commander Bark	
2023	Cute Executive Officer R	Mugaku Hamaoka	
2023	Lupin the 3rd vs. Cat's Eye	Daisuke Jigen	
2023	Good Night World	Shirō Akabane / Kojirō Arima	
2023	Onimusha	Musashi Miyamoto	
2024	The Grimm Variations	Brown	Episode 2: "Little Red Riding Hood"

=== Cinematic animation ===
Year	Title	Role	Notes	Ref.
1989	Kiki's Delivery Service	Dirigible Captain		
1992	Comet in Moominland	Moominpappa		
1992	Porco Rosso	Donald Curtis		
1995	Ghost in the Shell	Batou		
1995	Doraemon: Nobita's Genesis Diary	God		
1996	Black Jack: The Movie	Black Jack		
1997	A Chinese Ghost Story: The Tsui Hark Animation	Mountain Evil		
1998	Gundam Wing: Endless Waltz	Narrator		
2000	The Vision of Escaflowne	King Goau		
2001	Kinnikuman Nisei	The Cyborg		
2003	Inuyasha the Movie 3: Swords of an Honorable Ruler	Dog General		
2003	Tokyo Godfathers	Doctor		
2004	Ghost in the Shell 2: Innocence	Batou		
2004	Howl's Moving Castle	Kokuô		
2004	Nitaboh	Santaro		
2005	One Piece the Movie: Baron Omatsuri and the Secret Island	Baron Omatsuri		
2006	Detective Conan: The Private Eyes' Requiem	Inspector Yokomizo		
2006	Fist of the North Star: Legend of Raoh: Chapter of Death in Love	Souther		
2006	Naruto the Movie: Guardians of the Crescent Moon Kingdom	Michiru Tsuki		
2006	Paprika	Detective Konakawa Toshimi		
2007	Sword of the Stranger	Shougen		
2007	Vexille	Saito		
2009	Doraemon the Movie: Nobita's Spaceblazer	Guillermin		
2011	Ghost in the Shell: Stand Alone Complex - Solid State Society	Batou		
2012	Evangelion: 3.0 You Can (Not) Redo	Koji Takao		
2013	Berserk: Golden Age Arc	Skull Knight		
2015	The Empire of Corpses	M		
2015	GAMBA	Yoisho		
2015	Harmony	Asaf		
2016	Rudolf the Black Cat	Kuma-sensei		
2017	Genocidal Organ	Colonel Rockwell		
2017	Yo-kai Watch Shadowside: Oni-ō no Fukkatsu	Nezumi Otoko		
2019	Code Geass: Lelouch of the Re;surrection			
2019	Crayon Shin-chan: Honeymoon Hurricane ~The Lost Hiroshi~			
2020	Psycho-Pass 3: First Inspector	Tenma Todoroki		
2021	Pompo: The Cinéphile	Martin Braddock		
2022	Eien no 831	Murotoa		
2022	Laid-Back Camp Movie	Narrator		
2023	Sand Land	Satan		
2023	Psycho-Pass Providence	Tsugumasa Tonami		
2024	Pui Pui Molcar The Movie MOLMAX	Dodge's driver		
2024	Nintama Rantarō: Invincible Master of the Dokutake Ninja	Yamada Denzo		
2025	The Rose of Versailles	General Bouille		
2025	Batman Ninja vs. Yakuza League	Aquaman		
2025	Dream Animals: The Movie	Prof. Macaron		
2025	Whoever Steals This Book	Coffeehouse owner		
2026	Paris ni Saku Étoile	Kenkichi Sonoi		
2026	Grotesqqque	Space agency director		

=== Live-action films ===
Year	Title	Role	Notes	Ref.
2000	Blister	Terada		
2017	Re:Born	Phantom		
2019	Patalliro!			
2022	Yokaipedia	Hyakume (voice)		
2022	Let's Talk About the Old Times	Himself	Documentary	

=== Live-action television ===
Year	Title	Role	Notes	Ref.
2018	Dele	Hitoshi Tatsumi	Episode 8	
2020	Awaiting Kirin	Sōjirō	Taiga drama	
2020	The Legendary Mother	Akira		
2020	The Way of the Househusband	Narrator	Episode 1	
2022	A Day-Off of Ryunosuke Kamiki	Onodera	Episode 6	
2024	Wing-Man	Rimel		
2026	Water Margin	Yuan Ming		

=== Tokusatsu ===
Year	Title	Role	Notes
1995	Chōriki Sentai Ohranger	Bara Revenger	Ep. 15
1996	B-Fighter Kabuto	Tooth Clam Beast Nezugaira	Ep. 9
1997	Denji Sentai Megaranger	Canary Nejilar/Mega Yellow (During transitions)	Ep. 37
1998	Seijuu Sentai Gingaman	Zakkas	Ep. 46
1999	Kyuukyuu Sentai GoGo-V	Reaper Warrior Psyma Beast Thanatos	Ep. 33
2005	Mahou Sentai Magiranger	Hades Wise God Dagon	Ep. 35–49
2011	Gokaiger Goseiger Super Sentai 199 Hero Great Battle	Reverse Hades God Dagon	
2017	Uchu Sentai Kyuranger	Champ^{1}/Oushi Black^{2}/Yagyu Jubei^{3}	^{1}Ep. 1–13, 15–16, 21–30. ^{2}Ep. 1–5, 7–8, 11–13, 16, 21, 25–26, 28–30, 34. ^{3}Ep. 34.
2017	Kamen Rider × Super Sentai: Ultra Super Hero Taisen	Champ/Oushi Black	
2017	Uchu Sentai Kyuranger the Movie: Gase Indaver Strikes Back	Champ/Oushi Black	
2020	Kishiryu Sentai Ryusoulger VS Lupinranger VS Patranger the Movie	Ganima Noshiagalda	Movie
2020	Kamen Rider Saber	Seiken Swordriver voice, Narrator	Series

=== Video games ===
Year	Title	Role	Platform	Ref.
1993	Night Trap	Lt. Simms	Mega CD	Japanese dubbing
1995	Battle Tycoon: Flash Hiders SFX	Jail Lance	Super Famicom	
1995	Game Tengoku	Pigu	Arcade, Sega Saturn	
1995	Gulliver Boy	Lee 10 Bai	Sega Saturn, PC Engine	
1996	Dragon Force	Low	Sega Saturn, PlayStation 2	
1996	Lunar: Silver Star Story Complete	Laike Bogard, Dyne	Sega Saturn, PlayStation	
1996	PopoloCrois Story	GamiGami Devil	PlayStation	
1996	Enemy Zero	David Barnard	Sega Saturn	
1996	Twisted Metal 2	Calypso	PlayStation	Japanese dubbing
1997	YU-NO: A girl who chants love at the bound of this world	Kouzou Ryuuzouji	Sega Saturn, NEC PC-9801, Microsoft Windows	
1997	Ayakashi Ninden Kunoichiban	Juzen Hagakure	Microsoft Windows, PlayStation, Sega Saturn	
1997	Lego Island	Brickster	Microsoft Windows	Japanese dubbing
1997	The Last Blade	Hyo Amano	Arcade, Neo-Geo CD, Neo Geo Pocket Color, PlayStation, PlayStation 2	
1998	Panzer Dragoon Saga	Arwen	Sega Saturn	
1998	Sakura Wars 2: Thou Shalt Not Die	Seiya Ogata	Sega Saturn, Dreamcast, PlayStation Portable, Microsoft Windows	
1998	Metal Gear Solid	Solid Snake	PlayStation	
1998	Thousand Arms	Wire	PlayStation	
1998	Jade Cocoon: Story of the Tamamayu	Koris	PlayStation	
1999	Arc the Lad III	Galdo	PlayStation	
1999	The Legend of Dragoon	Zieg Feld	PlayStation	
1999	D2	David	Dreamcast	
2000	Project Justice	Daigo Kazama	Dreamcast	
2000	PopoloCrois Story II	GamiGami Devil, Esperanza	PlayStation	
2000	PopoloCrois: A New Departure	King Pietro	PlayStation 2	
2001	Onimusha: Warlords	Oda Nobunaga and Fortinbras	PlayStation 2	
2001	Metal Gear Solid 2: Sons of Liberty	Solid Snake, Solidus Snake	PlayStation 2, PlayStation 3, Xbox 360, PlayStation Vita	
2002	Kikō Busō G Breaker	Kyo Akatsuki	PlayStation 2	
2002	Kingdom Hearts	Ansem	PlayStation 2	
2002	Onimusha 2: Samurai's Destiny	Oda Nobunaga	PlayStation 2	
2002	Soulcalibur II	Spawn	Xbox	
2003	Boktai: The Sun Is in Your Hand	Otenko	Game Boy Advance	
2003	Onimusha Blade Warriors	Oda Nobunaga	PlayStation 2	
2003	Mega Man X7	Red	PlayStation 2	
2003	Tales of Symphonia	Regal Bryant	GameCube, PlayStation 2, PlayStation 3, Microsoft Windows	
2003	DreamMix TV World Fighters	Solid Snake	PlayStation 2	
2004	Blood Will Tell	Daigo Kagemitsu	PlayStation 2	
2004	Metal Gear Solid 3: Snake Eater	Naked Snake	PlayStation 2, PlayStation 3, Xbox 360, PlayStation Vita	
2004	Onimusha 3: Demon Siege	Oda Nobunaga	PlayStation 2	
2004	PopoloCrois: Enchanted Lunar Tale	King Pietro, GamiGami Devil	PlayStation 2	
2004	Samurai Warriors	Tadakatsu Honda	PlayStation 2	
2004	Spawn: Armageddon	Spawn	PlayStation 2	Japanese dubbing
2005	Ape Escape 3	Pipo Snake, Solid Snake	PlayStation 2	
2005	Metal Gear Ac!d²	Snake	PlayStation Portable	
2005	Namco × Capcom	Unknown Soldier 1P, Yoritomo	PlayStation 2	
2005	Kingdom Hearts II	Ansem	PlayStation 2	
2005	Genji: Dawn of the Samurai	Benkei Musahibo	PlayStation 2	
2005	Samurai Shodown 6	Gaoh/Demon Gaoh	Arcade, PlayStation 2, PlayStation 3, PlayStation 4	
2006	Time Crisis 4	William Rush	Arcade, PlayStation 3	
2006	Another Century's Episode 2	Anavel Gato	PlayStation 2	
2006	Metal Gear Solid: Portable Ops	Naked Snake	PlayStation Portable	
2006	Final Fantasy XII	Judge Gabranth	PlayStation 2	
2006	Genji: Days of the Blade	Benkei Musahibo	PlayStation 3	
2006	Prince of Persia: The Two Thrones	Prince	PlayStation 2	
2007	Mana Khemia: Alchemists of Al-Revis	Sulpher	PlayStation 2	
2007	Marvel: Ultimate Alliance	Blade	PlayStation 3	
2007	Warriors Orochi	Tadakatsu Honda	PlayStation 2	
2007	Kingdom Hearts Re:Chain of Memories	Ansem	PlayStation 2	
2008	Super Smash Bros. Brawl	Solid Snake, Samurai Goroh	Wii	
2008	Metal Gear Solid 4: Guns of the Patriots	Old Snake	PlayStation 3	
2008	Metal Gear Online	Old Snake	PlayStation 3	
2008	Valkyria Chronicles	Radi Jaeger	PlayStation 3, PlayStation 4, Microsoft Windows, Nintendo Switch	
2008	Tales of Symphonia: Dawn of the New World	Regal Bryant	Wii, PlayStation 3	
2008	Street Fighter IV	Seth	Arcade, PlayStation 3, Xbox 360, Microsoft Windows	
2008	428: Shibuya Scramble	Dr. Seiichi Saeki	Wii, PlayStation 3, PlayStation Portable, iOS, Android, PlayStation 4, Microsoft Windows	
2008	Dissidia Final Fantasy	Judge Gabranth	PlayStation Portable, PlayStation Vita	
2008	GetAmped2	Zenjiro	Microsoft Windows, OS X	
2008	Cosmic Break	Dracken	Microsoft Windows	
2009	Yakuza 3	Ryuzo Tamiya	PlayStation 3, PlayStation 4	
2009	Atelier Rorona: The Alchemist of Arland	Gio	PlayStation 3, PlayStation Vita, Nintendo 3DS, Nintendo Switch, PlayStation 4, Microsoft Windows	
2010	Metal Gear Solid: Peace Walker	Big Boss	PlayStation Portable, PlayStation 3, Xbox 360	
2010	Kingdom Hearts Birth by Sleep	Terra-Xehanort	PlayStation Portable	
2010	Castlevania: Lords of Shadow	Pan	PlayStation 3, Xbox 360	Japanese dubbing
2010	Marvel: Ultimate Alliance 2	Blade	PlayStation 3	Japanese dubbing
2011	Dissidia 012 Final Fantasy	Judge Gabranth	PlayStation Portable	
2011	Bleach: Soul Resurrección	Shunsui Kyōraku	PlayStation 3	
2012	Zero Escape: Virtue's Last Reward	Zero Sr.	Nintendo 3DS, PlayStation Vita, Microsoft Windows, PlayStation 4	
2012	Heroes Phantasia	Garuru	PlayStation Portable	
2012	Kingdom Hearts 3D: Dream Drop Distance	Ansem	Nintendo 3DS	
2012	Project X Zone	Seth	Nintendo 3DS	
2013	Metal Gear Rising: Revengeance	Hebidamashi (DLC weapon exclusive to the Japanese version)	PlayStation 3, Microsoft Windows, OS X	
2013	Final Fantasy XIV: A Realm Reborn	Gaius van Baelsar	PlayStation 3, PlayStation 4, Microsoft Windows, OS X	
2013	JoJo's Bizarre Adventure: All Star Battle	Wamuu	PlayStation 3	
2014	Metal Gear Solid V: Ground Zeroes	Venom Snake, Big Boss	PlayStation 3, PlayStation 4, Xbox 360, Xbox One, Microsoft Windows	
2015	Metal Gear Solid V: The Phantom Pain	Venom Snake, Big Boss	PlayStation 3, PlayStation 4, Xbox 360, Xbox One, Microsoft Windows	
2015	Return to PoPoLoCrois: A Story of Seasons Fairytale	GamiGami Devil	Nintendo 3DS	
2015	Fire Emblem Fates	King Garon	Nintendo 3DS	
2015	Lego Marvel Super Heroes	Ghost Rider	PlayStation 3	Japanese dubbing
2015	JoJo's Bizarre Adventure: Eyes of Heaven	Wamuu	PlayStation 3, PlayStation 4	
2016	Fate/Grand Order	Iskandar	Android, iOS, Arcade	
2017	Danganronpa V3: Killing Harmony	Ryouma Hoshi	PlayStation 4, PlayStation Vita, Microsoft Windows	
2017	Honkai Impact 3rd	HOMU	Android, iOS	
2017	Xenoblade Chronicles 2	Bana	Nintendo Switch	
2018	Super Smash Bros. Ultimate	Solid Snake, Samurai Goroh	Nintendo Switch	
2018	PopoloCrois Story Narcia's Tears and the Fairy's Flute	GamiGami Devil	Android, iOS	
2018	Fitness Boxing	Bernardo	Nintendo Switch	
2019	Final Fantasy XIV: Stormblood	Gaius van Baelsar	PlayStation 4, Microsoft Windows, macOS	
2019	Kingdom Hearts III	Xehanort, Ansem, Terra-Xehanort	PlayStation 4, Xbox One	
2019	Devil May Cry 5	Morrison	PlayStation 4, Xbox One, Microsoft Windows	
2019	Granblue Fantasy	Alandus, Raybury, Aletheia	Android, iOS, Web Browser	
2019	Final Fantasy XIV: Shadowbringers	Gaius van Baelsar	PlayStation 4, Microsoft Windows, macOS	
2019	Fire Emblem: Three Houses	Jeralt, Narrator	Nintendo Switch	
2019	Death Stranding	Die-Hardman	PlayStation 4	Japanese dubbing
2020	Yakuza: Like a Dragon	Koichi Adachi	PlayStation 4	
2020	Street Fighter V	Seth, Daigo Kazama	Microsoft Windows, PlayStation 4	
2020	Ghost of Tsushima	Lord Shimura	PlayStation 4	
2020	Final Fantasy Crystal Chronicles: Remastered Edition	Black Knight	Android, iOS, Nintendo Switch, PlayStation 4	
2020	Fitness Boxing 2: Rhythm and Exercise	Bernardo	Nintendo Switch	
2022	Trek to Yomi	Kagerou	PlayStation 4, PlayStation 5, Xbox One, Xbox Series X/S, Microsoft Windows	
2022	Fullmetal Alchemist Mobile	Father	Android, iOS	
2022	Live A Live	The Sundown Kid	Nintendo Switch	
2022	Digimon Survive	Piedmon	Nintendo Switch, PlayStation 4, Xbox One, Microsoft Windows	
2022	Xenoblade Chronicles 3	Z, Nopon Archsage	Nintendo Switch	
2022	The 13th Month	Grimalkin	Microsoft Windows	
2022	Fitness Boxing: Fist of the North Star	Souther	Nintendo Switch	
2023	Like a Dragon: Ishin!	Kondo Isami	PlayStation 4, PlayStation 5, Xbox One, Xbox Series X/S, Microsoft Windows	
2023	Xenoblade Chronicles 3: Future Redeemed	Z	Nintendo Switch	
2024	Like a Dragon: Infinite Wealth	Koichi Adachi	PlayStation 4, PlayStation 5, Microsoft Windows	
2024	Metaphor: ReFantazio	Heismay	PlayStation 5, Xbox Series X/S, Microsoft Windows	
2024	Gakuen Idolmaster	Kunio Juo	Android, iOS	
2025	Bleach: Rebirth of Souls	Shunsui Kyōraku	PlayStation 4, PlayStation 5, Xbox Series X/S, Microsoft Windows	
2026	Professor Layton and the New World of Steam	Falcon	Nintendo Switch, Nintendo Switch 2, PlayStation 5, Microsoft Windows	
2026	Final Fantasy Resonance	Veritas of the Dark	Nintendo Switch, Nintendo Switch 2, Playstation 5, Microsoft Windows, Xbox Series X/S	
2027	Stranger Than Heaven	Heigo Yashima	PlayStation 5, Xbox Series X/S, Microsoft Windows	

=== Drama CD ===
- Dengeki Bunko Best Game Selection7 Fire Emblem Tabidati no syou (????) (Hardin)
- Fire Emblem Shiranhen/Soumeihen (????) (King of Talys)
- Jojo's Bizarre Adventure (????) (Mohammed Avdol)
- Drama CD Metal Gear Solid (????) (Solid Snake)
- Sdatcher (????) (Jean-Jack Gibson)

== Dubbing roles ==
=== Voice-double ===
Title	Role	Notes	Ref.
Nicolas Cage
The Cotton Club	Vincent Dwyer	1988 TBS edition	
The Rock	Dr. Stanley Goodspeed		
Con Air	Cameron Poe		
Face/Off	Castor Troy	Original and 2004 TV Asahi edition	
Snake Eyes	Detective Rick Santoro		
Bringing Out the Dead	Frank Pierce		
The Family Man	Jack Campbell		
Gone in 60 Seconds	Randall "Memphis" Raines		
Captain Corelli's Mandolin	Captain Antonio Corelli		
Adaptation	Charlie Kaufman / Donald Kaufman		
Windtalkers	Sergeant Joe Enders		
Matchstick Men	Roy Waller		
National Treasure	Benjamin Gates		
Lord of War	Yuri Orlov		
Ghost Rider	Johnny Blaze / Ghost Rider		
National Treasure: Book of Secrets	Benjamin Gates		
Next	Cris Johnson		
Bangkok Dangerous	Joe		
Knowing	Professor Jonathan "John" Koestler		
Bad Lieutenant: Port of Call New Orleans	Terence McDonagh		
The Sorcerer's Apprentice	Balthazar Blake		
Drive Angry	John Milton		
Season of the Witch	Behmen von Bleibruck		
Seeking Justice	Will Gerard		
Trespass	Kyle Miller		
Ghost Rider: Spirit of Vengeance	Johnny Blaze / Ghost Rider		
Stolen	Will Montgomery		
Dying of the Light	Evan Lake		
Outcast	Gallain		
Pay the Ghost	Mike Lawford		
The Trust	Lieutenant Jim Stone		
USS Indianapolis: Men of Courage	Captain Charles B. McVay III		
Snowden	Hank Forrester		
Army of One	Gary Faulkner		
Dog Eat Dog	Troy		
Arsenal	Eddie King		
Vengeance: A Love Story	John Dromoor		
Mom and Dad	Brent Ryan		
The Humanity Bureau	Noah Kross		
Looking Glass	Ray		
Between Worlds	Joe		
Spider-Man: Into the Spider-Verse	Peter Parker / Spider-Man Noir	Animation	
A Score to Settle	Frank		
Grand Isle	Walter		
Running with the Devil	The Cook		
Pig	Robin "Rob" Feld		
The Unbearable Weight of Massive Talent	Nicolas Cage		
Renfield	Dracula		
The Old Way	Colton Briggs		
Dream Scenario	Paul Matthews		
Longlegs	Longlegs		
Spider-Noir	Ben Reilly / The Spider		
Steven Seagal
Above the Law	Nico Toscani	1993 TV Asahi edition	
Hard to Kill	Mason Storm	1994 TV Asahi edition	
Marked for Death	John Hatcher	1995 TV Asahi edition	
Out for Justice	Detective Gino Felino	1994 TV Asahi edition	
Under Siege	Casey Ryback	1995 TV Asahi edition	
Under Siege 2: Dark Territory	Casey Ryback	1998 TV Asahi edition	
Executive Decision	Lt. Colonel Austin Travis	1999 TV Asahi edition	
The Glimmer Man	Det. Lt. Jack Cole	1999 TV Asahi edition	
Fire Down Below	Jack Taggert	2000 TV Asahi edition	
Exit Wounds	Orin Boyd	2004 NTV edition	
Ticker	Frank Glass		
Half Past Dead	Sasha Petrosevitch		
Belly of the Beast	Jake Hopper		
The Foreigner	Jonathan Cold		
Out for a Kill	Prof. Robert Burns		
Submerged	Chris Cody		
Today You Die	Harlan Banks		
Attack Force	Marshall Lawson		
Mercenary for Justice	John Seeger		
Shadow Man	Jack Foster		
Black Dawn	Jonathan Cold		
Flight of Fury	John Sands		
Urban Justice	Simon Ballisteer		
The Onion Movie	Cock Puncher		
Pistol Whipped	Matt Conlin		
Kill Switch	Jacob		
The Keeper	Rolland Sallinger		
Driven to Kill	Ruslan		
Against the Dark	Tao		
A Dangerous Man	Shane Daniels		
Machete	Rogelio Torrez		
Born to Raise Hell	Samuel Axel		
Steven Seagal: Lawman	Steven Seagal		
True Justice	Elijah Kane		
Maximum Conviction	Cross		
Force of Execution	Mr. Alexander		
Gutshot Straight	Paulie Trunks		
A Good Man	Alexander		
Absolution	John Alexander		
Killing Salazar	Harrison		
The Perfect Weapon	The Director		
Code of Honor	Col. Robert Sikes		
The Asian Connection	Gan Sirankiri		
End of a Gun	Decker		
Sniper: Special Ops	Jake		
Contract to Kill	John Harmon		
China Salesman	Lauder		
Attrition	Axe		
Beyond the Law	Augustino 'Finn' Adair		
Denzel Washington
Glory	Trip		
Crimson Tide	Lieutenant Commander Ron Hunter		
He Got Game	Jake Shuttlesworth		
The Bone Collector	Lincoln Rhyme		
Remember the Titans	Herman Boone		
John Q.	John Archibald		
Out of Time	Matthias Lee Whitlock		
Man on Fire	John W. Creasy		
Déjà Vu	Douglas Carlin		
American Gangster	Frank Lucas		
The Book of Eli	Eli		
Unstoppable	Frank Barnes		
Safe House	Tobin Frost	2018 BS Japan edition	
2 Guns	Robert "Bobby" Trench		
The Equalizer	Robert McCall		
The Magnificent Seven	Sam Chisolm		
Fences	Troy Maxson		
Roman J. Israel, Esq.	Roman J. Israel		
The Equalizer 2	Robert McCall		
The Little Things	Joe "Deke" Deacon		
The Tragedy of Macbeth	Macbeth		
The Equalizer 3	Robert McCall		
Gladiator II	Macrinus		
Antonio Banderas
Assassins	Miguel Bain		
Desperado	El Mariachi		
Miami Rhapsody	Antonio		
Never Talk to Strangers	Tony Ramirez		
Two Much	Art Dodge		
The Mask of Zorro	Zorro		
The 13th Warrior	Ahmad ibn Fadlan		
Spy Kids	Gregorio Cortez		
Ballistic: Ecks vs. Sever	Jeremiah Ecks		
Spy Kids 2: The Island of Lost Dreams	Gregorio Cortez		
Once Upon a Time in Mexico	El Mariachi		
Spy Kids 3-D: Game Over	Gregorio Cortez		
The Legend of Zorro	Zorro		
Bordertown	Alfonso Diaz		
Take the Lead	Pierre Dulaine		
Genius	Pablo Picasso		
Dolittle	Rassouli		
Uncharted	Santiago Moncada		
Indiana Jones and the Dial of Destiny	Renaldo		
Samuel L. Jackson
Loaded Weapon 1	Sgt. Wes Luger		
Pulp Fiction	Jules Winfield		
Jackie Brown	Ordell Robbie		
No Good Deed	Jack Friar		
Basic	Master Sergeant Nathan West		
S.W.A.T.	Hondo		
Twisted	John Mills		
The Man	Agent Derrick Vann		
Cleaner	Tom Cutler		
Lakeview Terrace	Abel Turner		
Unthinkable	H		
Arena	Logan		
Meeting Evil	Richie		
Big Game	William Allan Moore		
The Hateful Eight	Major Marquis Warren		
Cell	Thomas "Tom" McCourt		
Dennis Quaid
Wyatt Earp	Doc Holliday		
Dragonheart	Bowen		
Switchback	Frank LaCrosse		
The Parent Trap	Nicholas "Nick" Parker		
Playing by Heart	Hugh		
The Rookie	Jim Morris		
Frequency	Francis Patrick "Frank" Sullivan	2003 NTV edition	
Cold Creek Manor	Cooper Tilson		
The Alamo	Sam Houston		
The Art of More	Samuel Brukner		
A Dog's Purpose	Ethan Montgomery		
A Dog's Journey	Ethan Montgomery		
Strange World	Jaeger Clade	Animation	
Strays	Birdwatcher		
Dolph Lundgren
Masters of the Universe	He-Man	1992 TV Asahi edition	
The Punisher	Frank Castle / Punisher		
Red Scorpion	Lt. Nikolai Rachenko		
Universal Soldier	Andrew Scott / GR13		
Silent Trigger	Waxman (Shooter)		
Blackjack	Jack Devlin		
Bridge of Dragons	Warchild		
Storm Catcher	Jack Holloway		
The Expendables	Gunner Jensen		
The Expendables 2	Gunner Jensen		
The Expendables 3	Gunner Jensen		
Shark Lake	Clint Gray		
Expend4bles	Gunner Jensen		
Masters of the Universe	"Macho Man"		
Javier Bardem
The Sea Inside	Ramón Sampedro		
Pirates of the Caribbean: Dead Men Tell No Tales	Captain Salazar		
Mother!	Him		
Dune	Stilgar		
The Little Mermaid	King Triton		
Dune: Part Two	Stilgar		
Monsters: The Lyle and Erik Menendez Story	José Menendez		
F1	Ruben Cervantes		
Wesley Snipes
Money Train	John	2000 Fuji TV edition	
Blade	Blade	2001 TV Tokyo edition	
U.S. Marshals	Mark J. Sheridan	2004 TV Tokyo edition	
The Art of War	Neil Shaw		
Liberty Stands Still	Joe		
The Detonator	Sonni Griffith	2009 TV Tokyo edition	
The Player	Mr. Isaiah Johnson		
Jonathan Frakes
Star Trek: The Next Generation	William T. Riker		
Star Trek Generations	William T. Riker		
Star Trek: First Contact	William T. Riker		
Star Trek: Insurrection	William T. Riker		
Star Trek: Nemesis	William T. Riker		
Star Trek: Lower Decks	William T. Riker	Animation	
Star Trek: Picard	William T. Riker		
Liam Neeson
Leap of Faith	Will		
Michael Collins	Michael Collins		
K-19: The Widowmaker	Polenin		
Clash of the Titans	Zeus	2012 TV Asahi edition	
The Grey	John Ottway		
Memory	Alex Lewis		
Marlowe	Philip Marlowe		
Clive Owen
Inside Man	Dalton Russell		
Elizabeth: The Golden Age	Sir Walter Raleigh		
Hemingway & Gellhorn	Ernest Hemingway		
Valerian and the City of a Thousand Planets	Commander Arün Filitt		

=== Live-action ===
Title	Role	Dubbing actor	Notes	Ref.
101 Dalmatians	Jasper	Hugh Laurie	2001 TV Asahi edition	
21	Cole Williams	Laurence Fishburne		
21 Grams	Jack Jordan	Benicio del Toro		
Alien	Dallas	Tom Skerritt	1992 TV Asahi edition	
Aliens	Corporal Hicks	Michael Biehn	1992 VHS/DVD edition	
Alien 3	Clemens	Charles Dance	1992 VHS edition	
Alive	Antonio Balbi	Vincent Spano		
Anonymous Rex	Ernie Watson	Daniel Baldwin		
Another 48 Hrs.	Jack Cates	Nick Nolte		
Avalon	Bishop	Dariusz Biskupski		
Avengers: Doomsday	Alexei Shostakov / Red Guardian	David Harbour		
Babylon A.D.	Toorop	Vin Diesel		
Bad Boys	Mike Lowrey	Will Smith	1999 Fuji TV edition	
Bad Girls	Kid Jarrett	James Russo		
Bill & Ted's Excellent Adventure	Genghis Khan	Al Leong		
Bill & Ted's Bogus Journey	Grim Reaper	William Sadler	1994 TV Tokyo edition	
Bill & Ted Face the Music	Grim Reaper	William Sadler		
Black Widow	Alexei Shostakov / Red Guardian	David Harbour		
Blown Away	James Dove	Jeff Bridges	1999 TV Asahi edition	
Braveheart	William Wallace	Mel Gibson		
Broken Trail	Tom Harte	Thomas Haden Church		
Bullets Over Broadway	Cheech	Chazz Palminteri		
Captain America	Red Skull	Scott Paulin		
The Cell	Peter Novak	Vince Vaughn		
The Chronicles of Riddick	Riddick	Vin Diesel		
Cliffhanger	Gabe Walker	Sylvester Stallone	1997 NTV edition	
Congo	Captain Monroe Kelly	Ernie Hudson		
Copycat	Daryll Lee Cullum	Harry Connick Jr.	1998 TV Tokyo edition	
The Count of Monte Cristo	Edmond Dantes	Jim Caviezel		
Creepshow 2	Sam Whitemoon	Holt McCallany	1989 TV Tokyo edition	
Crouching Tiger, Hidden Dragon	Li Mu Bai	Chow Yun-fat		
The Crow	Sgt. Albrecht	Ernie Hudson		
The Crucible	John Proctor	Daniel Day-Lewis		
D-Tox	Jake Malloy	Sylvester Stallone		
Days of Thunder	Rowdy Burns	Michael Rooker		
Deadpool 2	Cable	Josh Brolin		
Death Kiss	The Stranger	Robert Bronzi		
Deuce Bigalow: Male Gigolo	Antoine Laconte	Oded Fehr		
Die Hard	Karl Vreski	Alexander Godunov		
Die Hard 2	Colonel William Stuart	William Sadler	1992 Fuji TV edition	
Donnie Brasco	Sonny	Michael Madsen		
Double Cross	Jack Conealy	Patrick Bergin		
Dragons Forever	Hua's Henchman	Benny Urquidez	1990 Fuji TV edition	
Dutch	Dutch Dooley	Ed O'Neill		
EDtv	Ray	Woody Harrelson		
Emily Brontë's Wuthering Heights	Heathcliff	Ralph Fiennes		
Entrapment	Thilbadeaux	Ving Rhames		
ER	Peter Benton	Eriq La Salle		
Erin Brockovich	George	Aaron Eckhart		
Evil Dead II	Narrator		1991 TV Tokyo edition	
Final Destination 2	Eugene Dix	Terrence C. Carson	2006 TV Tokyo edition	
The Firm	Wayne Tarrance	Ed Harris		
The Fisher King	Jack Lucas	Jeff Bridges		
Flash Gordon	Flash Gordon	Sam J. Jones	1992 TV Asahi edition	
Furiosa: A Mad Max Saga	Immortan Joe / Rizzdale Pell	Lachy Hulme		
Ghost in the Shell	Batou	Pilou Asbæk		
Ghostbusters II	Winston Zeddemore	Ernie Hudson		
The Gift	Donnie Barksdale	Keanu Reeves		
Godzilla x Kong: The New Empire	Submarine Commander	Kevin Copeland		
Gone with the Wind	Rhett Butler	Clark Gable	1998 DVD edition	
Guilty as Sin	Phil Garson	Stephen Lang		
Hard Target	Chance Boudreaux	Jean-Claude Van Damme		
Hatfields & McCoys	William Anderson "Devil Anse" Hatfield	Kevin Costner		
Heat	Michael Cheritto	Tom Sizemore	1998 TV Asahi edition	
Hotel Rwanda	Mr. Tillens	Jean Reno		
House of the Dragon	Lord Corlys Velaryon	Steve Toussaint		
The Huntsman: Winter's War	Mirror Man	Fred Tatasciore		
I.Q.	James Moreland	Stephen Fry		
Identity	Rhodes	Ray Liotta	2007 TV Tokyo edition	
IF	Cosmo	Christopher Meloni		
Indecent Proposal	David Murphy	Woody Harrelson		
Indiana Jones and the Temple of Doom	Weber	Dan Aykroyd		
Jason Bourne	Robert Dewey	Tommy Lee Jones	2022 BS Tokyo edition	
Joey	Jimmy Costa	Adam Goldberg		
Journey 2: The Mysterious Island	Hank Parsons	Dwayne Johnson		
Just Cause	Sheriff Tanny Brown	Laurence Fishburne		
Kindergarten Cop	Detective John Kimble	Arnold Schwarzenegger		
Kiss the Girls	Will Rudolph	Tony Goldwyn		
Knock Off	Marcus Ray	Jean-Claude Van Damme		
Lara Croft: Tomb Raider	Manfred Powell	Iain Glen		
Last Action Hero	Jack Slater	Arnold Schwarzenegger	1996 Fuji TV edition	
Léon: The Professional	Léon	Jean Reno		
Little Women	Friedrich Bhaer	Gabriel Byrne		
Lockout	Alex	Vincent Regan		
Mackenna's Gold	Sheriff Mackenna	Gregory Peck	DVD edition	
Malcolm X	Baines	Albert Hall		
Martin	Father Howard	George A. Romero	2018 Blu-ray edition	
Mary Magdalene	Jesus Christ	Joaquin Phoenix		
Michael	Joseph Jackson	Colman Domingo		
Monster Hunter	The Admiral	Ron Perlman		
Mortal Engines	Shrike	Stephen Lang		
The Muse	Jack Warrick	Jeff Bridges		
New Jack City	Stone	Mario Van Peebles		
Night of the Living Dead	Ben	Tony Todd		
Ocean's 8	Claude Becker	Richard Armitage		
Operation Napoleon	William Carr	Iain Glen		
Patriot Games	Sean Miller	Sean Bean		
Peacemaker	Christopher Smith / Peacemaker	John Cena		
Percy Jackson & the Olympians: The Lightning Thief	Mr. Brunner/Chiron	Pierce Brosnan		
Phone Booth	The Caller	Kiefer Sutherland		
Punisher: War Zone	Frank Castle / Punisher	Ray Stevenson		
Raising Cain	Jack Dante	Steven Bauer		
Red Notice	Opening Narrator	Robert Clotworthy		
Remo Williams: The Adventure Begins	Stone	Patrick Kilpatrick		
The Replacement Killers	John Lee	Chow Yun-fat		
Reservation Road	Ethan Learner	Joaquin Phoenix		
Riddick	Riddick	Vin Diesel		
Roman Holiday	Irving Radovich	Eddie Albert	1992 TBS / 1994 VHS edition	
The Running Man	Ben Richards	Arnold Schwarzenegger	1989 Fuji TV edition	
The Shining	Jack Torrance	Steven Weber		
Sideways	Jack Cole	Thomas Haden Church		
Single White Female	Graham Knox	Peter Friedman		
Snow White	Doc	Jeremy Swift		
Snow White and the Huntsman	Mirror Man	Chris Obi		
Solace	Joe Merriweather	Jeffrey Dean Morgan		
The Soloist	Nathaniel Ayers	Jamie Foxx		
Species series	Preston Lennox	Michael Madsen		
Spotlight	Marty Baron	Liev Schreiber		
Striking Distance	Thomas Hardy	Bruce Willis		
Sudden Death	Darren McCord	Jean-Claude Van Damme		
The Suicide Squad	Christopher Smith / Peacemaker	John Cena		
Thunderbolts*	Alexei Shostakov / Red Guardian	David Harbour		
Twin Peaks: Fire Walk with Me	Chester Desmond	Chris Isaak		
The Walking Dead	Negan	Jeffrey Dean Morgan		
Wasabi	Hubert Fiorentini	Jean Reno		
White Squall	Captain Christopher "Skipper" Sheldon	Jeff Bridges		

=== Animation ===
Title	Role	Notes	Ref.
The Addams Family	Lurch		
The Addams Family 2	Lurch		
Batman: The Animated Series	Two-Face		
DuckTales	Launchpad McQuack		
The Exploits of Moominpappa: Adventures of a Young Moomin	Moominpappa		
Marvel Zombies	Alexei Shostakov / Red Guardian		
Minions: The Rise of Gru	Jean Clawed		
Moomins on the Riviera	Moominpappa		
The Road to El Dorado	Tzekel-Kan		
Sing 2	Jimmy Crystal		
The Adventures of Tintin	Colonel Jorgen		
Spirit: Stallion of the Cimarron	Colonel		
The Summit of the Gods	Habu Joji		

=== Other ===
- Bionicle (Tahu, Lhikan)
- Code Lyoko (XANA)
- Mega64 (Konami Janitor (Rocco Botte))
- VR Troopers (Grimlord/Karl Ziktor) (Gardner Baldwin)

== Awards ==
Year	Award ceremony	Award	Result
2006	5th Tokyo Anime Award	Best Voice Actor	Won
2012	2nd Newtype Anime Awards	Best Voice Actor	Won
2015	9th Seiyu Awards	Kei Tomiyama Memorial Award	Won
