= End of a Gun =

- Theatrical release poster
- Directed by: Keoni Waxman
- Screenplay by: Chuck Hustmyre; Keoni Waxman
- Story by: Chuck Hustmyre
- Produced by: Daniel Grodnik; Steven Seagal
- Starring: Steven Seagal; Florin Piersic Jr. Jade Ewen; Jacob Grodnik
- Cinematography: Nathan Wilson
- Edited by: Trevor Mirosh
- Music by: Michael Richard Plowman
- Production companies: Daniel Grodnik Productions; Grindstone Entertainment Group
- Distributed by: Lionsgate
- Release date: September 23, 2016
- Running time: 96 minutes
- Country: United States
- Language: English

End of a Gun is a 2016 American action film directed by Keoni Waxman, starring Steven Seagal in the lead role.

== Plot ==
In Paris, Michael Decker (Steven Seagal), a former DEA agent gets involved with a British woman, Lisa Durant (Jade Ewen), when he shoots the man beating her up. She suggests he help her steal $2 million from a drug lord.

== Cast ==
- Steven Seagal as Michael Decker
- Florin Piersic Jr. as Gage
- Jade Ewen as Lisa Durant
- Jacob Grodnik as Trevor
- Jonathan Rosenthal as Luc
- Ovidiu Niculescu as Captain Jean Dardou
- Claudiu Bleont as Chauvin
- Troy Miller as Plumber
- Alexandre Nguyen as Pee Wee
- Andrei Ciopec as Ronnie Martin
- George Remes as Sergeant
- Lavinia Geambasu as Secretary
- Radu Andrei Micu as Hotel Manager
- Victoria Ene as Delphine
- Danielle Elise Fischer as Waitress
- Alin Panc as Antoine (uncredited)
- Thomas Semeraro as Mr. Vargas (uncredited)

== Production ==
The film is set in France, but was shot in Romania, New Orleans and Atlanta, Georgia in August–September 2015. Waxman said the film was "very different Seagal movie than Killing Salazar - this one is more like The Keeper. Steven in suits being chased by cool French bad guys - like an Elmore Leonard story (think Out of Sight). Steven and Jade Ewen are a great crime film couple on a double crossing heist. Florin Piersic Jr. from Killing Salazar chasing after them. Simple and cool story this time around".

== Reception ==
Eoin at TheActionElite.com gave the film 2/5 and wrote: "Director Keoni Waxman seems to be the only filmmaker who can get Seagal to nearly put in some effort and compared to much of his other recent movies End of a Gun is mildly less painful to sit through."
