= Force of Execution =

- Promotional release poster
- Directed by: Keoni Waxman
- Written by: Richard Beattie; Michael Black
- Produced by: Nicolas Chartier; Phillip B. Goldfine; Steven Seagal
- Starring: Steven Seagal; Ving Rhames; Danny Trejo; Bren Foster
- Cinematography: Nathan Wilson
- Edited by: Trevor Mirosh
- Music by: Michael Richard Plowman
- Production company: Voltage Pictures
- Release date: December 17, 2013
- Running time: 99 minutes
- Country: United States
- Language: English
- Box office: $206,000

Force of Execution is a 2013 American action crime film directed by Keoni Waxman, written by Richard Beattie and Michael Black, and starring Steven Seagal, Ving Rhames, and Danny Trejo. The film marked the fourth collaboration between Seagal and Waxman (following The Keeper, A Dangerous Man, and Maximum Conviction), and the fourth collaboration between Steven Seagal and executive producer Binh Dang (following Into the Sun, True Justice, and Maximum Conviction). The film is set and filmed in Albuquerque, New Mexico.

Keoni Waxman said "The movie is a different tone than the previous films – a crazy, violent ‘grindhouse’ style... There isn't as much gun play as Max Con but we wanted to go old school and make a sort of ‘western kung fu movie’ on this one."

== Plot ==
A crime lord is torn between his legacy and his desire to leave the life of crime that built his empire. A new villain tries to use the town's anti-hero network to climb to power. The crime lord must rely on his assassin protégé, who has his own troubles. In an epic battle of under-bosses and crime lords, only one will survive.

== Cast ==
- Steven Seagal as John Alexander
- Ving Rhames as "Ice Man"
- Danny Trejo as "Oso"
- Bren Foster as Roman Hurst
- Jenny Gabrielle as Karen
- Marlon Lewis as Dante
- David House as "Dre"
- Gillie Da Kid as Clay
- Andy Brooks as "Monty D"
- Jermaine Washington as "Truck"
- Cajardo Rameer Lindsey as Benny (as Cajardo Lindsey)
- Ivan G'Vera as Constantine
- J.D. Garfield as Cesare
- Rio Alexander as Manny
- Dylan Kenin as Sasha
- Johnnie Hector as Romero
- Binh Dang as Supervisor
- Noel Gugliemi as Cesare's Gangster
- Jesus Jr. as Strip Club Bouncer
- Frank Mir as Alexander's Body Guard After Prison Riot

== Prequel ==
A prequel called A Good Man was released in 2014. Seagal and Keoni reprised their roles as actor and director respectively.
