= Absolution (2015 film) =

2015 film by Keoni Waxman

- Promotional release poster
- Directed by: Keoni Waxman
- Written by: Richard Beattie; Keoni Waxman
- Produced by: Binh Dang; Phillip B. Goldfine; Timothy Marlowe; Agustin; Keoni Waxman; Benjamin Sacks; Stan Wertleib; Barry Brooker; Marlowe Harvey
- Starring: Steven Seagal; Byron Mann; Vinnie Jones; Josh Barnett; Adina Stetcu; Massimo Dobrovic
- Edited by: Trevor Mirosh
- Music by: Michael Richard Plowman
- Production company: Castel Film Romania
- Distributed by: Lionsgate Entertainment; Grindstone Entertainment Group; Anchor Bay Entertainment; Daro Film Distribution; AMG Entertainment
- Release date: May 15, 2015
- Running time: 91 minutes
- Country: Romania
- Language: English

Absolution (also known as The Mercenary: Absolution) is a 2015 English-language Romanian action film directed by Keoni Waxman and starring Steven Seagal, Vinnie Jones, and Byron Mann. The film is a sequel to A Good Man, and is the sixth collaboration between Steven Seagal and director Waxman. The film also marks the third collaboration between Seagal and Jones (who starred in Submerged (2005) and Gutshot Straight (2014), and between Seagal and Mann (who previously starred in Belly of the Beast (2003) and A Dangerous Man (2009).

== Premise ==
John Alexander is approached by an agency individual named Van Horn. He is given a mission to kill an Afghan National who is suspected of providing terrorists with stealth technology. Alexander swears to Van Horn that before he takes this mission, he wants to make sure he is not being used for political gain and swears vengeance if that is the case. After the information was credible, Alexander and his associate Chi break into the compound and kill the Afghan National. Meanwhile, a girl is being beaten by a masked man and is able to secure her escape. She grabs the camera and a ledger detailing his network and his crimes. Alexander gets a call from Van Horn, saying his extraction is on hold which leads to Alexander suspecting foul play. Alexander and Chi head over to a bar, awaiting their extraction. They have a couple of drinks and cigars. The girl escapes the masked man's club and arrives at the same bar Alexander and Chi were at. She lands in his lap, begging for help while Alexander was hesitant but when the thugs touch him, he dispatches them with his martial arts skills. He and Chi both agree to meet back at the HQ, splitting up. The girl gets into Alexander's car and begs him to take her with. Alexander had his reservations and decided to let her in. Alexander is the first to arrive at the HQ and Chi notices the girl came with. Alexander and Chi lament over the fact that protocol is broken and the girl explains to them how the masked man was a mob boss who tortured girls for his own fun and detailed his crimes. While hesitant to help them, Alexander breaks into a brief monologue saying "I have been a bad man... I have been a very bad man most of my life... I lost my faith in mankind and I believe everyone is out there to fuck me... But I decided I want to do one good thing in my life... One good thing before I die... Even if I die in the process... I need to do that for my own absolution". He decides to help the girl, considering it his absolution for what he's done in his past. Van Horn calls and explains why he broke protocol and tells Alexander about how the girl was in trouble but the client wants the girl back. Alexander makes a phone call to a contact to get some gear and Chi takes off to handle the threat as well. In the ensuing chaos, Chi is captured by the mob boss and it's revealed Van Horn was in on the whole thing from the start. After a lengthy battle, Van Horn is killed by a vengeful Alexander and Chi is saved. Chi goes his own way as his debt to Alexander is paid and Alexander rests easy, leaving behind the shadows of his past.

== Cast ==
- Steven Seagal as John Alexander
- Byron Mann as Chi
- Vinnie Jones as The Boss
- Josh Barnett as Colt
- Adina Stetcu as Nadia
- Massimo Dobrovic as Handler
- Maria Bata as Diana
- Sabrina Branduse as Alexander's Wife
- Dominte Cosmin as Sergei
- Sergiu Kostache as Kamal Wahid
- Howard Dell as Van Horn
- Adina Galupa as Sofia
- Alec Rayme as Vladimir
- Sebestian James as Dimitri
- George Remes as Victor
- Leslie Anne Down as Svetlana

== Production ==
Seagal said that he was attracted to the lead role because "I'm always trying to find something a little bit different from what people have seen me do before. I wanted to play somebody kind of mysterious and on the edge, so you don't really know if you like him or hate him until the middle of the movie." He says he wrote his character's line "I want to do one good thing before I die even if I die in the process of doing it".

It was one of several films Seagal made with Keoni Waxman. "I think that Keoni is one of the brightest young men out there", said Seagal. "I think he's a very good director. I think he has a wonderful story-mind, which is very important – in other words, he doesn't just have to film what's on the page... [he] understands editing, looping, dubbing, mixing, foley… He's a great friend: very ethical and very moral".

Waxman confirmed that Seagal wrote his character's opening monologue. He says everyone on the film "was just a little bit excited about the idea of hey, this one Steven wants to do something a little different. He was much more engaged with the character, much more engaged with the storyline, much more engaged with the idea that he had to have this absolution for this thing."

The film was shot in Romania, New Orleans, Louisiana and Atlanta, Georgia.

== Reception ==
Eoin at TheActionElite.com gave the film 2.5/5 and wrote: "Absolution is saved by some imaginative violence and Byron Mann's easy going coolness. It's let down by Seagal just being the same as he always is and using too many doubles during the action".
