= Hunt to Kill =

- Directed by: Keoni Waxman
- Written by: Frank Hannah
- Produced by: Tim Brown; Jack Nasser; Jack Heller
- Starring: Steve Austin; Gil Bellows; Gary Daniels; Marie Avgeropoulos; Michael Hogan; Eric Roberts
- Cinematography: Tom Harting
- Edited by: Jamie Alain
- Music by: Michael Richard Plowman
- Distributed by: Nasser Group
- Release date: November 9, 2010
- Running time: 98 minutes
- Countries: Canada; United States
- Language: English

Hunt to Kill is a 2010 Canadian-American direct-to-video action film starring Steve Austin, Gil Bellows, and Eric Roberts.

== Plot ==
The film begins with US Border Patrol Agents Jim Rhodes and Lee Davis exploring a seemingly abandoned trailer in Texas. Before entering the trailer, Lee gives Jim a watch made from climbing rope that can be used as emergency gear. They find a meth lab and are promptly attacked by men who shoot Lee and set the trailer on fire. Lee dies and Jim is forced to flee the trailer before it explodes.

Four years later, a pack of thieves have stolen millions of dollars in bearer bonds from the Hotel Palacio casino in Reno. They regroup in a warehouse where the bonds are stolen by one of the group, Lawson. The other thieves, led by Lawson's unhinged right-hand man, Banks, manage to track Lawson to Lowery, Montana, where Jim now lives with his rebellious daughter Kim. He's called in to pick her up from the sheriff's office after she was caught shoplifting, only to discover Banks beating and killing the sheriff. They force Jim to help them traverse the wilderness and find Lawson, threatening to kill Kim if he refuses. Jim reluctantly agrees and the group sets out into the mountains, though during the trek, Banks has one of the thieves, Jensen, kill off another of their own, Crab, after he hurts Kim and the thieves' only female member, Dominika, whom Banks is in love with. The thieves catch up to Lawson, who they kill after taking back the money. Assuming that Kim can guide them to the Canada–United States border, they push Jim off a cliff, though Geary, the thieves' jumpy member, struggles to keep up along the way.

Now angrier than before, Jim survives and hunts the thieves, picking them off one by one (Geary, Jensen, and Dominika in that order) until only Banks is left. Banks flees to an outpost occupied by three Canadian cops. He murders the cops and flees in one of their ATVs, leaving Kim behind. Jim arrives on the scene and takes one of the remaining ATVs to chase after Banks, telling Kim to use the other to get help. He catches up to Banks in an abandoned mineshaft and factory, and the two men battle, culminating in Jim killing Banks by pinning him to a wall with an ATV and causing an explosion with a flare gun. The film ends with Jim and Kim safe, having finally bonded, but realizing that they must now walk home as the other ATVs were destroyed.

== Cast ==
- Steve Austin as U.S. Border Patrol Agent Jim Rhodes
- Marie Avgeropoulos as Kim Rhodes
- Gil Bellows as Banks
- Gary Daniels as Jensen
- Michael Eklund as Geary
- Eric Roberts as U.S. Border Patrol Agent Lee Davis
- Michael Hogan as Lawson
- Adrian Holmes as "Crab"
- Emilie Ullerup as Dominika
- Donnelly Rhodes as Sheriff Westlake
- Brent Stait as U.S. Border Patrol Agent Walt
- Darcy Laurie as Gangbanger #1
- Lloyd Adams as Gangbanger #2
- Kimani Ray Smith as Gangbanger #3 (credited as Kimani Smith)
- Victor Formosa as Dakota (uncredited)

== Production ==
Hunt to Kill began filming during December 2009 in Vancouver, British Columbia, Canada. Steve Austin was confirmed as the film's protagonist, Jim Rhodes, and he acted alongside Gary Daniels, and Eric Roberts. The trio had worked together for the 2010 action film The Expendables and Austin personally selected them for Hunt to Kill. Austin stated that he felt "really in my element" while filming the wilderness scenes and that he could relate to his character as both he and the character of Rhodes had spent a lot of time away from their families due to work. He received the script while filming another movie in Vancouver and Austin gave input on script based on his own experience as a hunter in order to "make this a realistic hunt".

Director Keoni Waxman took the directing gig, in part due to his love for the Sidney Poitier/Tom Berenger mountain thriller Shoot to Kill. He was initially tentative about doing a similar film, but when he learned that avid outdoorsman Austin would be involved, he became confident that they could put their own stamp on the concept. Waxman was set to direct Born to Raise Hell with Steven Seagal, but instead had his regular stunt coordinator and second unit director Lauro Chartrand replace him on that picture.

== Release ==
Hunt to Kill was released direct to video in the United States on November 9, 2010 through Anchor Bay Entertainment.

== Reception ==
Critical reception has been predominantly negative. Common Sense Media rated the film 2 out of 5 stars. Mike Barnard of Future Movies UK said, "There's nothing much to see here unless you're an ardent Stone Cold fan." Dread Central rated the film 2/5, criticizing its pacing.
