= Byron Mann =

Hong Kong-American actor

Byron Mann Fung SBS
- 文峰
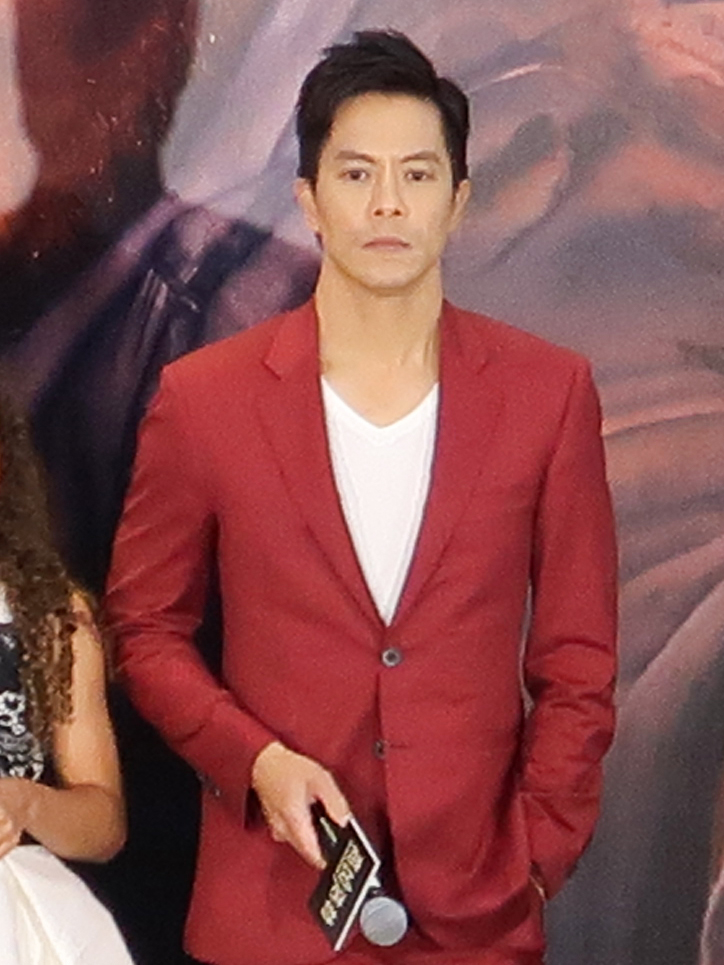
- Mann in July 2018, at a Skyscraper press conference in Beijing.
- Born: Byron Chan; British Hong Kong
- Citizenship: United States
- Education: USC Gould School of Law; University of California, Los Angeles
- Occupation: Actor
- Years active: 1992–present

Chinese name
- Traditional Chinese: 文峰
- Simplified Chinese: 文峰
Transcriptions
Standard Mandarin
- Hanyu Pinyin: Wén Fēng
Yue: Cantonese
- Jyutping: Man4 Fung1

Byron Mann Fung (Chinese: 文峰; Jyutping: Man4 Fung1; nè Chan) is a Hong Kong-American actor. His best-known roles include Ryu in Street Fighter, Silver Lion in The Man with the Iron Fists, Wing Chau in The Big Short, Admiral Augusto Nguyen on The Expanse, Chang on Hell on Wheels, Yao Fei on Arrow, and Uncle Six in the Netflix series Wu Assassins.

== Early life and education ==
Mann was born in Hong Kong to a Chinese-American mother and a Chinese father. He was raised bilingual in English and Cantonese and grew up in Kowloon. Mann attended the Diocesan Boys' School, an all-boys secondary school in Hong Kong.

Mann attended a Christian college in Chicago, Illinois. After his first year, he transferred to UCLA in Los Angeles, California, where he majored in philosophy. After graduation, Mann attended USC Law School. During law school, he decided to pursue acting and took a sabbatical to explore opportunities in Hong Kong. Mann later returned to finish law school and passed the California bar exam.

He changed his last name from Chan to Mann.

== Career ==
Mann made his film debut in the 1990 TV movie Last Flight Out. He acted in the film while on a sabbatical at USC Law School.

Mann starred in films such as Red Corner and The Corruptor, and in the television show Dark Angel, and has also co-starred in Catwoman and Invincible. He is best known as Ryu in Street Fighter and Koh in the manga-based movie Crying Freeman.

In 2012, Mann starred in The Man with the Iron Fists, directed by RZA. In 2015, Mann appeared in The Big Short, a Paramount Pictures feature film directed by Adam McKay. He also was a series regular on AMC's Hell on Wheels, playing the powerful railroad mercenary Chang.

In 2018, Mann was a recurring character on Netflix's Altered Carbon. In June 2018, it was announced that Mann was cast in the series regular role of Uncle Six on the Netflix series, Wu Assassins.

== Awards and nominations ==
In 2016, Mann was nominated for the Golden Maple Award for Best Actor in a TV series broadcast in the U.S. for his role on Hell on Wheels.

== Personal life ==
Prior to his acting career, Mann was a top-ranked tennis player, under 16 division, in Hong Kong.

== Filmography ==
=== Film ===
Year	Title	Role
1992	Ghost Ship	Charlie
1994	Possessed by the Night	Fok Ping Wong
1994	Deadly Target	Chang
1994	Street Fighter	Ryu Hoshi
1995	Crying Freeman	Koh
1997	Red Corner	Lin Dan
1998	American Dragons	'Shadow'
1999	The Corruptor	Bobby Vu
2003	Belly of the Beast	Sunti
2004	Catwoman	Wesley
2004	Sniper 3	Detective Quan
2007	Shanghai Kiss	Jai Li
2007	The Counting House	Jackie
2007	Blonde and Blonder	Mr. Wong
2009	Motherland	Michael Wong
2009	A Dangerous Man	The Colonel
2012	Cold War	Chan Bin
2012	The Man with the Iron Fists	Silver Lion
2013	A Stranger in Paradise	Lek
2014	Rise of the Legend	Black Crow
2015	Absolution	Chi
2015	Jasmine	The Suspect
2015	The Big Short	Wing Chau
2018	Skyscraper	Inspector Wu
2019	Don't Let Go	Sergeant Roger Martin
2023	Heroes of the Golden Masks	Jiahao
2023	Dark Asset	John
2023	The Modelizer	Shawn Koo

=== Television ===
Year	Title	Role	Notes
1990	Last Flight Out		TV film
1992	Tequila and Bonetti	Jeffrey Han	Episode: "Brooklyn and the Beast"
1993	Murphy Brown	Quan Chang	Episode: "The Young & the Rest of Us"
1994	Time Trax	Taki	Episode: "Return of the Yakuza"
1994	Galaxy Beat	Two-headed Man	TV film
1996	Murder, She Wrote	Yosuki Ishida	Episode: "Kendo Killing"
1996	Pacific Blue	Marlon Ky	Episode: "The Enemy Within"
1997	The Sentinel	Tommy Wu	Episode: "Poachers"
1999	Martial Law	Ataru Nakamura	Episode: "This Shogun For Hire"
2000	Walker, Texas Ranger	P.K. Song	Episode: "Black Dragons"
2000–2002	Dark Angel	Detective Matt Sung	Recurring role (8 episodes)
2001	UC: Undercover	Simon Shen	Episode: "Amerikaz Most Wanted"
2002	Robbery Homicide Division	Twan Kee	Episode: "Life is Dust"
2003	Invincible	Michael Fu	TV film
2003	First to Die	Derek Lee	TV film
2003–2005	Smallville	Commander Cheng / Kern	2 episodes
2004	Petits Mythes urbains	Dr. Shaw / Dr. Lee	Episode: "Scalpel illégitime"
2006	Fallen	Samchiel	Miniseries
2007	Nobody	Mr. North	TV film
2007	Dragon Boys	Tommy Jiang	Miniseries
2009	The Unit	Stanley Wu	Episode: "Bad Beat"
2010	Durham County	Julian Cho	Recurring role (3 episodes)
2010	Bloodletting & Miraculous Cures	Chen	Miniseries
2010	Burn Notice	Ming Khan	Episode: "Fast Friends"
2011	Befriend and Betray	Winstead P.C. Lau	TV film
2011	True Justice	Savon	Episode: "Street Wars: Part 2"
2012	Arctic Air	Gavin	Episode: "New North"
2012	Nikita	Agent Li Bai	Episode: "3.0"
2012–2019	Arrow	Yao Fei Gulong	Recurring role (14 episodes)
2014	The Novice	Johnny Joo	TV film
2014	Hawaii Five-0	Fire Captain Hank Iona	Episode: "Ku I Ka Pili Koko"
2015	CSI: Cyber	Jordan Tan	Episode: "URL, Interrupted"
2015–2016	Hell on Wheels	Chang	Recurring role (9 episodes)
2016	Rush Hour	Fong	Recurring role (2 episodes)
2016	NCIS: Los Angeles	Zhang Kiu	Episode: "Black Market"
2016–2018	Blood and Water	Evan Ong	Recurring role (16 episodes)
2017–2018	The Expanse	Admiral Augusto Nguyễn	Recurring role (8 episodes)
2018	Altered Carbon	Takeshi Kovacs / Dimitri Kadmin	Recurring role (3 episodes)
2019	Wu Assassins	Uncle Six	Main cast
2020	Little Fires Everywhere	Ed Jan	Recurring role (3 episodes)
2020	Agents of S.H.I.E.L.D.	Li	Episode: "After, Before"
2022	Blood & Treasure	Vince Tran	Recurring role (4 episodes)
2022	The Recruit	Xander	Recurring role (5 episodes)
2023	Blue Eye Samurai	Mikio	Episode: "The Tale of the Ronin and the Bride"
2025	Wild Cards	Jin	Episode: "The Big Bang Theory"
2025	Wayward	Brian	Recurring role

=== Video games ===
Year	Title	Role	Notes
2012	Sleeping Dogs	Raymond Mak, Pockmark Cheuk (voices)	
2012	Call of Duty: Black Ops II	General Tian Zhao (voice)	Also motion capture
