= Born to Raise Hell (film) =

2010 American action film

- Film poster
- Directed by: Lauro Chartrand
- Written by: Steven Seagal
- Produced by: Phillip B. Goldfine; Steven Seagal
- Starring: Steven Seagal; Dan Bădărău; Darren Shahlavi
- Cinematography: Eric J. Goldstein
- Edited by: Trevor Mirosh
- Music by: Michael Neilson
- Production company: Voltage Pictures
- Distributed by: Paramount Home Entertainment
- Release dates: October 18, 2010 (UK); April 19, 2011 (US)
- Running time: 92 minutes
- Country: United States
- Languages: English; Romanian; Russian

Born to Raise Hell is a 2010 American action film directed by Lauro Chartrand. It stars and written by Steven Seagal, who also produced the film with Phillip B. Goldfine. The film co-stars Dan Bădărău and Darren Shahlavi. The film was released on direct-to-DVD in the United States on April 19, 2011.

== Plot ==
After 9/11, the United States government realized that narcotics were responsible for financing the majority of terrorist cells. That is why they created the International Drug Task Force (IDTF). The IDTF task forces are fully funded and overseen by the United States government. They took their top narcotics officers and created interdiction teams throughout Asia and Eastern Europe.

Bobby Samuels (Steven Seagal) heads an IDTF team in Bucharest, Romania. Six months ago, Bobby's partner was killed. Now, headquarters has sent him a new partner named Steve (D. Neil Mark). Steve's wife is eight months pregnant, and he would really like to make it home to see the birth of his child.

Russian drug kingpin Dimitri (Dan Bădărău) has a wife (Silvia Stanciu) and a young son (Ștefan Iancu), both of whom he holds sacred, and the son is not aware of his drug business. Recently, Dimitri has formed a drug dealing partnership with Costel (Darren Shahlavi), a Romanian man who runs the Roma Ace, one of the most popular clubs in Bucharest.

Costel and his men specialize in home invasions - they invade wealthy people's homes, steal whatever loot they can get, and kill the family. During each invasion, Costel himself rapes and kills the wife. And Costel owes Dimitri some money. Dimitri has threatened that Costel will die if he does not come up with the money.

Bobby and Steve are put on Costel's trail, and Bobby tries to get Dimitri to point them to Costel, but Dimitri is suspicious at first. After Bobby and Steve arrest Dimitri in an effort to get him to help them, Dimitri butts his head through a door window of their SUV, and accuses Bobby and Steve of brutality. Dimitri gets released, and Bobby and Steve continue their hunt for Costel.

One night while Dimitri is away from his mansion, Costel and his men break into the mansion, and Costel's right-hand man Dada (Zoltán Butuc) fatally shoots Dimitri's wife. Before Costel can kill Dimitri's son, Dimitri's men intervene, killing a couple of Costel's men as Costel and Dada escape.

Dimitri arrives at the mansion, learns what happened, and vows to make Costel and Dada pay. Dimitri's traumatized son describes his wife's shooter to him. Dimitri contacts Bobby, and offers to help Bobby find Costel, if Bobby will let Dimitri handle Dada himself. Bobby agrees, and he, Steve, and Dimitri set out to bring Costel and Dada down.

Eventually, Dimitri kills Dada while Bobby enters a hotel and kills Costel. Afterwards, as a sign of respect, Bobby gives Dimitri tickets to take his son back to Odessa to raise him there, and Dmitri accepts the offer from Bobby.

== Cast ==
- Steven Seagal as Robert 'Bobby' Samuels
- Dan Bădărău as Dimitri
- Darren Shahlavi as Costel
- D. Neil Mark as Steve
- George Remeș as Ronnie
- Claudiu Bleonț as Bruce Sorin
- Mădălina Marinescu as Tami
- Călin Puia as Christian
- Zoltán Butuc as Dada
- Ștefan Iancu as Dimitri's Son
- Silvia Stanciu as Dimitri's Wife
- Ioan Ionescu as Darius
- Marius Chivu as Vlad
- Kenneth Londoner as Igor

== Production ==
Original director Keoni Waxman was set to direct this movie, but when he was offered to direct Hunt to Kill starring Steve Austin he pulled out. Lauro Chartrand, who was directing second unit, was offered to direct.

== Release ==
Born to Raise Hell was released on DVD in the United Kingdom on October 18, 2010, and in the United States on April 19, 2011.

== Reception ==
Ian Jane of DVD Talk rated it 3/5 stars and wrote, "Born to Raise Hell doesn't bring anything new to Seagal's filmography but it's entertaining enough in its own ridiculous way." Roy Hrab of DVD Verdict wrote, "Born to Raise Hell doesn't have much to offer anyone." James Dennis of Twitch Film wrote, "Why does he still bother, when he clearly can't be bothered?"
