= Born to Raise Hell =

Born to Raise Hell may refer to:

== Music ==
- "Born to Raise Hell" (Motörhead song), 1993
- "Born to Raise Hell", a Church of Misery song from the 2009 album Houses of the Unholy
- "Born to Raise Hell", a Cheap Trick song from the 1983 film Rock & Rule
- "Born to Raise Hell", 2015 Crazy Town song on the album The Brimstone Sluggers

== Film ==
- Born to Raise Hell (film), a 2010 American action film
