= Ivan G'Vera =

Czech-American actor

Ivan G'Vera (born Ivan Šplíchal; April 1, 1959) is a Czech-American actor, best known for his role as Ivan Marais on the American soap opera Days of Our Lives from 1991 to 2000, and sporadically thereafter.

== Biography ==
At age 18, the Prague-born young man fled Czechoslovakia for the United States, attended college, and later became an actor, adopting the stage name "Ivan G'Vera".

He was nominated for the "Outstanding Scene Stealer" by Soap Opera Digest Award in 1998.

G'Vera is a naturalized citizen of the United States.

== Filmography ==
Year	Title	Role	Notes
1990	The Hunt for Red October	Officer #2 - Red October	
1991	Going Under	Soviet Sonar Man	
1991–2000, 2011, 2020–21, 2024	Days of Our Lives	Ivan Marais	332 episodes
2001, 2003, 2007	Četnické humoresky	McGregor	5 episodes
2006	Casino Royale	Venice Hotel Concierge	
2009	Terminator Salvation	General Dimitri Lysenko	
2010	Burnt by the Sun 2	Villi	
2012	A Royal Affair	German Doctor	
2013	Martin a Venuše		
2013	Příběh kmotra		
2013	Force of Execution	Constantine	
2015	Child 44	Budenny	
2016	Independence Day: Resurgence	Russian President	
2018	Zlatý podraz	John Trusil	
2019	Brecht	Doctor Los Angeles	
2023	Obliterated	Vlad Litvin	6 episodes
