= Massimo Dobrovic =

Istrian Italian actor

- Born: 1 November 1984 (age 41); Pula, SR Croatia, SFR Yugoslavia (Now Croatia)
- Occupation: Actor
- Known for: Euros of Hollywood, Age of the Living Dead

Massimo Dobrovic is an Istrian Italian actor known from the show Euros of Hollywood.

== Personal life ==
Dobrovic is openly gay.

== Filmography ==
=== Film ===
Year	Title	Role	Notes
2006	Abstract		
2012	The Office One	Massimo	Short film
2012	Molte Lampadine	Salvatore	Short film
2013	Quarantine L.A.	Zombie	Film
2013	Love Triangle	Thug #4	Film
2013	Life of Guy	Hyena	Short
2013	Love and Laundry	Stefano	Short film
2014	A Good Man	Roberto	Film
2015	Gnome Alone	Thug #2	Film
2015	Badge of Honor	Trevor Rodriguez	Film
2015	Absolution	Handler	Film
2015	Nocturna	Carlo	Film
2015	Navy Seals vs. Zombies	Dave	Film
2016	Christmas All Over Again	Antonio Rinaldi	Film
2017	Cartels	Massimo – Hotel Manager	Film
2017	Altitude	Mechanic	Film
2017	Trafficked	Goran	Film
2017	The Secret of Karma	Thomas	Film
2018	Not Alone	Marcus Wallace	Short film
2018	Guilded Cage	Boney	Film
2018	The First Key	Abel	Film
2018	Nation's Fire	Mr. DeGaines	Film
2018	Behind the Curtain of Night	Thomas	Film
2019	Juke Box Hero	Producer	Film

=== Television ===
Year	Title	Role	Notes
2007	Obični Ljudi	Mislav	TV series (19 episodes)
2007	Ma chi l'avrebbe mai detto...	Gino	TV movie
2007	Urota	Dražen	TV series (2 episodes)
2008	Ponos Ratkajevih	Dubravko Lulić	TV series (31 episodes)
2008	Zakon Ljubavi	Petar Tadić	TV series (31 episodes)
2009	Crime Evidence	Ion Mirtea	TV series
2009-2010	Squadra antimafia – Palermo oggi	Narco-Columbiano	TV series
2011	We Have a Pope	Guardia Svizzera	TV movie
2013	Wit Sex	Barlow	TV series
2013	Marge and Lucille	Carlos	TV series
2013	Counseling Crazy	Luca	TV series
2014	Noches con Platanito	Guillermo Rodriguez	TV series
2017	Feel the Dead	Vincent	TV series (6 episodes)
2018	Age of the Living Dead	Marcus	TV series (6 episodes)

=== Live TV ===
Year	Title	Role	Notes
1999	OK! TV	Himself	
2014	Noches con Platanito	Himself	
2014	The People's Couch	Himself	
2014	Euros of Hollywood	Himself	
2016	Rica Famosa Latina	Himself	
