= Cartels (film) =

- Directed by: Keoni Waxman
- Written by: Keoni Waxman; Richard Beattie
- Starring: Steven Seagal; Luke Goss; Georges St-Pierre; Darren E. Scott; Florin Piersic Jr. Martine Argent
- Cinematography: Nathan Wilson
- Music by: Michael Richard Plowman
- Production companies: Daro Film Distribution; 24TL Productions; Action House
- Distributed by: Lionsgate
- Release date: July 7, 2017
- Running time: 100 minutes
- Country: United States
- Language: English
- Budget: $6 million
- Box office: $37,776

Cartels, also known as Killing Salazar, is a 2017 action film starring Luke Goss and directed by Keoni Waxman, also featuring Steven Seagal. It had a limited theatrical release on July 7, 2017, and was released on DVD and digital streaming on September 19, 2017.

== Cast ==
- Steven Seagal as John Harrison
- Luke Goss as Major Tom Jensen
- Georges St-Pierre as Bruno Sinclaire
- Darren E. Scott as Major John "Skony" Skokowski
- Florin Piersic Jr. as Joseph "El Tiburon" Salazar
- Martine Argent as Amanda Chavez
- Lauro David Chartrand-DelValle as Eric Ramirez (credited as Lauro Chartrand)
- Bruce Crawford as Gary Dentze
- Claudiu Bleonț as Emilian
- Howard Dell as Mike Darol
- George Remes as Chief Cristi Badea (credited as Remes George)
- Adina Eady as Luca Negru (credited as Adina Galupa)
- Sharlene Royer as Ana
- Bogdan Farcas as Swat Commander
- Massimo Dobrovic as Massimo, Hotel Manager

== Production ==
Originally titled Killing Salazar, the film was directed by Keoni Waxman and written by Waxman and Richard Beattie. Luke Goss was chosen to play the protagonist, U.S. Marshal Tom Jensen, whereas Steven Seagal, who had collaborated with Waxman on more than half a dozen projects, was cast in a supporting role. Seagal also produced the film alongside Binh Dang. Michael Richard Plowman composed the film's soundtrack.

== Reception ==
Noel Murray of the Los Angeles Times commented that the film "is passably entertaining", but criticised Seagal's involvement in it – which amounted to "roughly 15 minutes of screen time" – as more distracting than it was value-adding, concluding that "with his thick leather coat, bushy goatee, tinted glasses, and whispery monotone voice, he (Seagal) looks like an ordinary schlub in a Steven Seagal costume." Frank Scheck of The Hollywood Reporter credited Waxman for filming the "action scenes with reasonable proficiency" but ultimately labelled Cartels as a "far cry" from Seagal's best works.
