= Voltage Pictures =

American film production and distribution company

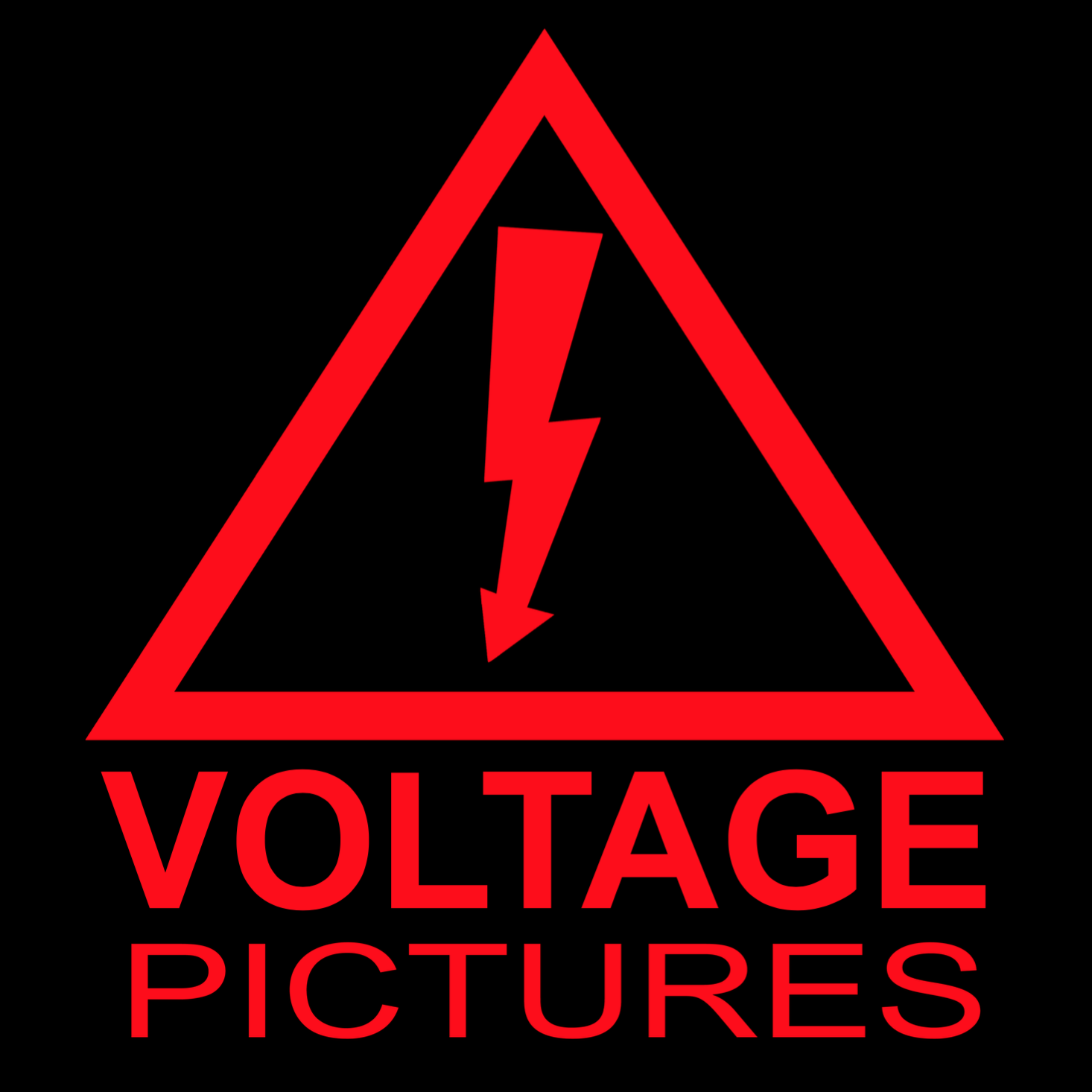
- Official company logo
- Industry: Motion picture
- Founded: 2005; 21 years ago
- Founder: Nicolas Chartier
- Headquarters: Los Angeles, California, United States
- Key people: Nicolas Chartier (CEO); Jonathan Deckter (President & COO)
- Products: Motion pictures
- Website: voltagepictures.com

Voltage Pictures is an American film production and distribution company founded by Nicolas Chartier in 2005. It has assembled over 180 motion pictures, earning the company a total of two Golden Globe Awards and nine Academy Awards.

== Recent films ==
Recently released by Voltage is The Marksman starring Liam Neeson which opened on January 12, 2021 via Open Road; the second installment of the After franchise, After We Collided, starring Josephine Langford and Hero Fiennes Tiffin.

Additional releases include I Feel Pretty starring Amy Schumer and Michelle Williams, which grossed nearly $100 million worldwide upon its release in 2018, Extremely Wicked, Shockingly Evil and Vile starring Zac Efron and Lily Collins, which premiered at the 2019 Sundance Film festival and subsequently sold to Netflix, and Ava, directed by Tate Taylor and starring Jessica Chastain, Colin Farrell, John Malkovich, Common, Geena Davis, and Joan Chen.

== Sales titles ==
The Voltage sales slate includes the thriller Fear of Rain starring Harry Connick Jr. and Katherine Heigl, which was released February 12, 2021, via Lionsgate, and Body Brokers, which was released February 12, 2021, via Vertical Entertainment. Other titles include the gangster crime biopic Lanksy starring Harvey Keitel, Sam Worthington and Annasophia Robb, the political biopic Reagan, starring Dennis Quaid, Penelope Ann Miller with Academy Award winner Jon Voight, the horror-thriller The Seventh Day starring Guy Pearce, and the war-thriller Condor's Nest starring Arnold Vosloo.

== Television ==
Voltage Pictures has produced two seasons of True Justice starring Steven Seagal which aired on 5USA, the 6 episode series Age of the Living Dead / Age of the Undead, and most recently serving as executive producers on Six which is currently airing on The History Channel.

== Awards ==
The Hurt Locker, starring Jeremy Renner took home six Academy Awards, including Best Picture, Best Director and Best Screenplay in 2009. Dallas Buyers Club, directed by Jean-Marc Vallée and starring Matthew McConaughey, Jared Leto and Jennifer Garner. The film received three Academy Awards, including Best Actor and Best Supporting Actor, and two Golden Globes, again in the two acting categories.

== Piracy ==
In 2014, Voltage Pictures filed a slew of "John Doe" lawsuits against individuals they accused of torrenting the film Dallas Buyers Club, which Voltage had produced.

In 2018, it was discovered that Voltage was attempting to sue 55,000 Canadians for sharing their films online. Policy experts have called this move a case of copyright trolling.

== Films ==
- 2008 - The Hurt Locker
- 2009 - A Dangerous Man
- 2010 - Tucker & Dale vs. Evil
- 2010 - The Traveler
- 2010 - The Whistleblower
- 2010 - Born to Raise Hell
- 2010 - Game of Death
- 2010 - Gaturro: The Movie
- 2011 - Killer Joe
- 2011 - Rosewood Lane
- 2011 - Faces in the Crowd
- 2011 - Another Happy Day
- 2012 - Rites of Passage
- 2012 - The Magic of Belle Isle
- 2012 - Generation Um...
- 2012 - The Company You Keep
- 2012 - Border Run
- 2012 - Maximum Conviction
- 2012 - Seal Team Six: The Raid on Osama Bin Laden
- 2013 - Don Jon
- 2013 - Empire State
- 2013 - Absolute Deception
- 2013 - The Zero Theorem
- 2013 - Dallas Buyers Club
- 2013 - Ambushed
- 2013 - Force of Execution
- 2014 - Reasonable Doubt
- 2014 - Puncture Wounds
- 2014 - A Good Man
- 2014 - Burying the Ex
- 2014 - Cabin Fever: Patient Zero
- 2014 - Good Kill
- 2014 - The Cobbler
- 2014 - American Heist
- 2014 - Playing It Cool
- 2015 - Knock Knock
- 2015 - Fathers and Daughters
- 2015 - Navy Seals vs. Zombies
- 2015 - Pay the Ghost
- 2015 - Walt Before Mickey
- 2016 - Good Kids
- 2016 - Colossal
- 2016 - A Family Man
- 2016 - I.T.
- 2017 - All Eyez on Me
- 2017 - Wind River
- 2017 - Keep Watching
- 2017 - Once Upon a Time in Venice
- 2017 - Revolt
- 2017 - Singularity
- 2016 - LBJ
- 2017 - Alien Invasion: S.U.M.1
- 2018 - I Feel Pretty
- 2018 - Between Worlds
- 2018 - Then Came You
- 2019 - Daniel Isn't Real
- 2019 - Extremely Wicked, Shockingly Evil and Vile
- 2019 - After
- 2019 - The Professor and the Madman
- 2019 - VFW
- 2020 - The 2nd
- 2020 - After We Collided
- 2020 - Ava
- 2020 - Archenemy
- 2020 - The Call
- 2021 - The Marksman
- 2021 - The Seventh Day
- 2021 - After We Fell
- 2021 - Lansky
- 2021 - Deadly Illusions
- 2021 - Aileen Wuornos: American Boogeywoman
- 2021 - Crime Story
- 2021 - Time Is Up
- 2022 - Game of Love
- 2022 - After Ever Happy
- 2022 - Loneliest boy in the world
- 2023 - Condor's Nest
- 2023 - Beautiful Disaster
- 2023 - See you on Venus
- 2023 - After Everything
- 2023 - Girl You Know It's True
- 2024 - You Can't Run Forever
- 2024 - Aftermath
- 2024 - 1 Million Followers
- 2025 - Marked Men: Rule + Shaw
- 2025 - Safe House
- 2026 - All Night Wrong
