= Bren Foster =

British-Australian actor

- Born: 2 November 1976 (age 50); London, England
- Citizenship: Australia; United States; British
- Occupation: Actor
- Years active: 2001–present
- Spouse: Chelsea Foster
- Children: 3

Bren Foster (born 2 November 1976) is an Australian actor and martial artist. He is best known for his role in The Last Ship on TNT. Foster holds black belts in taekwondo, hapkido, hwarangdo and Brazilian jiu-jitsu.

== Career ==
Foster has appeared in television series such as Days of Our Lives and Melissa & Joey, and films such as Cedar Boys and Force of Execution. In 2015, Foster landed the recurring role of CPO Wolf "Wolf-Man" Taylor on the TNT post-apocalyptic drama series The Last Ship.

== Filmography ==
=== Film ===
Year	Title	Role	Notes
2026	Beast	Xavier Grau	
2026	Mexicali	Joe	
2026	Relentless	Connor	
2024	Life After Fighting	Alex Faulkner	
2020	Deep Blue Sea 3	Lucas	
2016	Science Fiction Volume One: The Osiris Child	Charles Kreat	
2015	Infini	Morgan Jacklar	
2015	Terminus	Agent Stipe	
2013	Force of Execution	Roman Hurst	
2012	Maximum Conviction	Bradley	
2011	War Flowers	John Ellis	
2011	Bad to the Bone	Bone	
2011	Venger	Michael McCullough	
2009	Cedar Boys	Jamal Ayoub	
2009	Drowning	Tommy	
2009	Vinyl	Alex	
2008	Man of Blood	Tony Rey	
2001	Invincible	Shadowman # 2	

=== Television ===
Year	Title	Role	Notes
2024	Last King of the Cross	Pete Reynolds	Season 2 (8 episodes)
2021	Home and Away	Stephen Tennyson	Season 34 (recurring, 19 episodes)
2015–2018	The Last Ship	CPO Wolf "Wolf-Man" Taylor	41 episodes
2011–2012	Melissa & Joey	Jules D. Sawyer	2 episodes
2011–2012	Days of Our Lives	Quinn Hudson	108 episodes
2011	Femme Fatales	Howard	Episode: "Something Like Murder"
2008–2010	Fight Science	Himself	2 episodes
2009	Sea Patrol	LEUT Cliff Bailey	2 episodes
2008	Review with Myles Barlow	Novio de Kelly	Episode #1.3
2008	The Strip	Russell Keegan	Episode #1.2
2007–2008	Home and Away	Tony	Seasons 20–21 (guest, 3 episodes)
2008	East West 101	Guy	Episode: "The Hand of Friendship"
2005	Home and Away	Alex	Season 18 (guest, 1 episode)

=== Video games ===
Year	Title	Role	Notes
2015	Mad Max	Max Rockatansky	Also motion capture
