= Beatrice Rancea =

Romanian stage director (born 1961)

Beatrice Rancea (née Jurian on August 19, 1961, in Bucharest; married Bleonţ between 1986–2001) is a Romanian stage director.

== Career ==
Rancea studied choreography before attending the Bucharest National Academy of Theatrical and Film Art, where she studied theatre and choreography.

She has staged several plays in Romania, most notably Eugène Ionesco's Requiem and Anton Chekhov's The Wedding, as well as others, at the Bucharest National Theatre Bucharest. She has also staged six bilingual plays in Hungary, casting Romanian and Hungarian-speaking actors, with texts in both languages. Bleonţ also staged a well-received performance of The Flying Dutchman with the Romanian National Opera.

Bleonţ has received several awards for her work, being honoured for at the 1992 Bucharest Festival of Comedy for Chekhov's Wedding, as well as winning the UNITER Prize for the debut of Ionesco's Requiem (and receiving another for a staging of The Merry Wives of Windsor) She also won the Public's Prize at the International Theatre Festival, and was nominated as the 1998 Woman of the Year by the magazine Avantaje.

In 2011 she became General Manager of The National Opera in Iași, Romania.

== Personal life ==
Rancea has been married to actor Claudiu Bleonț between 1986 and 2001. After their divorce she married Doru Rancea.
