= Navy Seals vs. Zombies =

2015 Film by Stanton Barrett

- Promotional poster
- Directed by: Stanton Barrett
- Written by: Matthew Carpenter
- Story by: A.K. Waters
- Produced by: Phillip B. Goldfine; Jason Hewitt; Robert Marcovich; Jeffrey Reyes; Benjamin Sacks; Steve Shelanski
- Starring: Ed Quinn; Michael Dudikoff; Rick Fox; Molly Hagan; Lolo Jones
- Cinematography: Don E. Fauntleroy
- Edited by: Stanton Barrett; Riley C. Morris
- Music by: Patrick De Caumette; Brian Jackson Harris; Drew Jordan; Justin Raines; Michael Wickstrom
- Production company: Voltage Pictures
- Distributed by: Anchor Bay Entertainment
- Release date: October 8, 2015
- Running time: 97 minutes
- Country: United States
- Language: English
- Budget: $1.2 million

Navy Seals vs. Zombies (also known as Navy Seals: The Battle for New Orleans or simply Navy Seals: Battle New Orleans) is a 2015 American action horror film directed by Stanton Barrett and starring Ed Quinn, Michael Dudikoff, Rick Fox, Molly Hagan and Lolo Jones. It was released on October 8, 2015.

== Plot ==
In Baton Rouge, Louisiana, a police officer is investigating a suspicious van when he is suddenly attacked by zombies.

In NAS Oceana, Virginia Beach, Virginia, members of SEAL Team Six are conducting a training exercise as well as training their newest member, Petty Officer AJ Prescott who is replacing a fallen SEAL who was killed in an operation near the Pakistan border. After the training exercise, AJ returns home where it is revealed that his wife Emily is pregnant with their first son, as well as being indecisive on a name.

Back in Baton Rouge, Reporters Amanda and Dave are at a press conference hosted by Vice President Bentley in the State Capitol Building. As the press conference concludes, VP Bentley with members of his administration exit the building when a hordes of zombies begin attacking and infecting civilians around the area, forcing the VP to retreat back into the building.

Following the attack, the SEALs are called in and informed on the situation going on where it is revealed that a distress call was sent out before losing communication. The SEAL team led by Lieutenant Pete Cunningham enter into the city via HALO. While searching the State Capitol Building, the SEALs eventually find Bentley, along with other survivors including Amanda and Dave.

CIA agent Stacy Thomas informs Commander Sheer that the situation is actually a biological attack and that she has an asset on site that could potentially reverse it but also need extraction, leaving the SEALs with the task.

Margaret, one of Bentley's staff hides the fact that she has been bitten in order to avoid being left behind. Just before the helicopter arrives, the zombies attack the SEALs and the survivors, and Chief Petty Officer Travis was killed in the process.

As the helicopters fly off, Margaret turns into a zombie and attacks, causing the helicopter to crash. The SEALs set out to extract agent Thomas' asset with Amanda and Dave following. The SEALs make it to their objective point where they meet Larry, a security guard, who leads them to where there need to go. While making their way to the objective, continuing fighting hordes of zombies, AJ is bitten, so he gives Amanda his sidearm for when he turns. The SEALs locate Rebecca, Thomas' asset, but before they leave, she needs a sample from one of the zombies in order to produce a vaccine. Sheer orders the blockade of any passage that leads out of the city and bridges to be blown up to avoid the infection spreading across the country.

En route to the extraction point, Dave is killed. Having a sample from one of the zombies, the team prepares to leave but not before spotting AJ and Amanda outside. Carl asks Pete to let him go after him, which Pete grants. Carl reaches to AJ and Amanda, but is attacked by zombies, so Carl stays back and holds them off, giving AJ and Amanda enough time to get to the helicopter with the remaining SEALs.

The remaining survivors board the helicopter, and AJ reveals to Pete that he is infected, insisting the he stays behind. Pete tells him to get on the chopper, saying he isn't leaving him behind again and that the scientist may have the cure. AJ complies and boards the chopper. As the chopper flies away, missiles strike the city.

At the United States Capitol, agent Thomas is meeting with Senators regarding the outbreak, revealing that AJ, along with the other SEALs, are immune to the infection due to given shots that changes their molecular structure making them immune. AJ, finally having returned home, reunites with Emily. AJ finally decides on a name for his son: Carl.

== Cast ==
- Ed Quinn as Lieutenant Pete Cunningham
- Michael Dudikoff as Lieutenant Commander Sheer
- Jaxson Ryker as Petty Officer 1st Class Carl
- Mikal Vega Petty Officer 1st Class Billy McKnight
- Kevin Kent as Chief Petty Officer Travis
- Damon Lipari as Petty Officer 2nd Class AJ Prescott
- Stephanie Honoré as Amanda
- Massimo Dobrovic as Dave
- Rick Fox as Vice President Bentley
- Molly Hagan as CIA Agent Stacy Thomas
- Lolo Jones as Margaret
- Dwight Henry as Armed civilian
- Charlie Talbert as Larry
- Sara Benjamin as Rebecca
- Jackie Becker as Emily

== Production ==
The film was shot in Baton Rouge, Louisiana.
