= Contract to Kill =

- Romanian theatrical release poster
- Directed by: Keoni Waxman
- Written by: Keoni Waxman
- Produced by: Steven Seagal; Keoni Waxman; Binh Dang
- Starring: Steven Seagal
- Edited by: Trevor Mirosh
- Production companies: Daro Film Distribution; Actionhouse Pictures
- Distributed by: Lionsgate
- Release date: December 9, 2016
- Running time: 90 minutes
- Country: United States
- Language: English
- Budget: $5 million
- Box office: $7,048

Contract to Kill is a 2016 American action film starring Steven Seagal. It received a limited theatrical release in the United States, and was released via video on demand.

== Plot ==
U.S. Immigration and Customs Enforcement (ICE) border patrol agents apprehend two "other than Mexican" migrants affiliated with Al-Qaeda in the Arabian Peninsula (AQAP) and Daesh; the Central Intelligence Agency (CIA) suspects that the terrorists are negotiating a deal with the Sonora Cartel – headed by José Rivera (Mircea Drambareanu) – to smuggle terrorists from Mexico into the United States. Former Drug Enforcement Administration (DEA) and CIA Agent John Harmon (Steven Seagal), who had raided a Sonora compound and killed its previous leader, El Mini Oso, is enlisted by CIA intermediary Matt Beck (Andrei Stanciu) to end the extremists' plot.

Harmon recruits old flame and Federal Bureau of Investigation (FBI) agent Zara Hayek (Jemma Dallender) and United States Army Special Forces/CIA-trained spy-drone pilot Matthew Sharp (Russell Wong) after learning that the meeting between the terrorist coalition and the Sonora Cartel will be in Istanbul, Turkey. In Istanbul, Harmon's team spy on Hezbollah leader Ayan Al-Mujahid (Sergiu Costache) and Rivera but the meeting is cut short and adjourned after al-Mujahid notices Sharp's drone.

Following a brief car chase and shootout between Harmon and al-Mujahid's men, Harmon learns from Beck that the real target is Abdul Rauf (Ghassan Bouz), the bomb-maker responsible for the downing of a Crimea Airlines plane in Syria. Rivera's men raid Harmon's safehouse and abduct Hayek; Harmon and Sharp locate and kill Al-Mujahid and his men at the Palace Hotel. Rivera and Rauf escape to the former's compound in Rumelifeneri but are tracked down by Harmon, who shoots them in the neck and head respectively, before embracing Hayek. The film ends with Harmon musing about the necessity of operatives like himself.

== Production ==
The film was shot in Romania.

== Cast ==
- Steven Seagal as John Harmon
- Russell Wong as Matthew Sharp
- Jemma Dallender as Zara Hayek
- Mircea Drambareanu as Jose Rivera
- Sergiu Costache as Ayan Al-Mujahid
- Ghassan Bouz as Abdul Rauf
- Andrei Stanciu as Matt Beck

== Reception ==
On review aggregator Rotten Tomatoes, the film holds a 0% approval rating based on five reviews, with an average rating of 1.2/10. Metacritic, using a weighted average, assigned the film a score of 3 out of 100 based on 5 critics, indicating "overwhelming dislike".

The A.V. Club reviewer Ignatiy Vishnevetsky described Contract to Kill as "Steven Seagal bad", writing that "objectively, Contract To Kill is the most carelessly made movie to be released theatrically by a major studio in a few years; its standards may even be called negligent. It belongs in a museum, along with all of the other Seagal curios". Writing for RogerEbert.com, Odie Henderson gave the film one star, criticising in particular the acting, editing, special effects and "inane" plot. The Hollywood Reporter's Frank Scheck was especially critical of Seagal's lacklustre performance in Contract to Kill, and summarised the film as "laughably inept on every technical level and representing the sort of badness that falls far short of being campy fun". Kimber Myers of the Los Angeles Times similarly noted Seagal's "completely bored" delivery, though conceding that the film "will probably please fans of Seagal's work".
