= Ștefan Iancu =

Romanian actor

- Born: 26 December 1997 (age 28); Bucharest, Romania
- Education: I. L. Caragiale National University of Theatre and Film; Ovidius University of Constanța
- Occupation: Actor
- Years active: 2001 – present

Ștefan Iancu (born 26 December 1997) is a Romanian actor. Born in Bucharest, Romania, Iancu began acting at the age of 4. He has remained active throughout much of his childhood and into adult life.

== Education ==
Iancu studied at the I. L. Caragiale National University of Theatre and Film, graduating in 2020, and then obtained a master's degree in acting from the Ovidius University of Constanța in 2023.

== Awards ==
He starred in the 2017 feature film One Step Behind the Seraphim, for which he won a Gopo Award.

He received the Best Newcomer award at the 2019 Subtitle Film Festival.
