= Keoni Waxman =

American film director (born 1968)

- Born: 30 June 1968 (age 57)
- Occupation: Film director

Keoni Waxman (born June 30, 1968) is an American film director best known for his work with Steven Seagal since 2009 with the film The Keeper.

== Filmography ==
- I Shot a Man in Vegas (1995)
- Countdown (1996)
- Almost Blue (1996)
- Sweepers (1998)
- The Highwayman (2000)
- Intrepid (2000; written only)
- Hostage Negotiator (2001; TV Movie)
- Lost Treasure (2003; screenplay only)
- Shooting Gallery (2005)
- Amber's Story (2006; TV Movie)
- The Suspect (2006)
- Unthinkable (2007; TV Movie)
- The Anna Nicole Smith Story (2007)
- The Keeper (2009)
- A Dangerous Man (2009)
- Hunt to Kill (2010)
- True Justice (2010–2012; TV Series, 8 episodes)
- Maximum Conviction (2012)
- Force of Execution (2013)
- A Good Man (2014)
- Absolution (2015)
- Contract to Kill (2016)
- End of a Gun (2016)
- Cartels (2017)
- The Hard Way (2019)
- Alpha Code (2020)
- The Ravine (2021)
- Hong Kong Love Story (TBA)
