= Howard Dell =

Canadian bobsledder (born 1962)

Personal information
- Born: 14 April 1962 (age 64) Toronto, Ontario, Canada

Sport
- Sport: Bobsleigh, Canadian football

Howard Dell (born 14 April 1962) is a Canadian former bobsledder and Canadian football player. He competed in the four man event at the 1988 Winter Olympics. Dell played for the Toronto Argonauts and Winnipeg Blue Bombers of the Canadian Football League in 1990 and 1991 as a wide receiver and defensive back.
