= Michael Richard Plowman =

- Born: July 20, 1965 (age 61)
- Origin: London, United Kingdom
- Occupations: Composer, conductor
- Years active: 1985-present
- Website: www.michaelplowman.com

Michael Richard Plowman (born July 20, 1965) is a British composer and conductor, based in London, UK, Los Angeles County, California, and Vancouver, British Columbia, Canada.

== Early life and education ==
Plowman was born in England, where he learned to play the trumpet at the early age of three. Plowman's interest in music quickly grew, as did his aspirations. He began teaching himself different orchestral instruments. Over the course of his schooling years, Plowman was a member of jazz and rock groups, playing gigs at local clubs, and at the age of 14, Plowman landed his first commercial television job. At the age of 16, he received a recording contract and produced his first album, The Now Sounds of Today.

== Career ==
Working in film, television and games has given me the opportunity to explore many new musical styles and techniques. Every production is unique and providing an original score is essential.

— Michael Richard Plowman

Plowman continued his musical training at universities in Canada and the United States. He began conducting and touring worldwide with various orchestras and choirs, then moved into theater, and finally into composing music for films, television shows, and video games. Plowman has worked for Sony Pictures Television, the BBC, Cartoon Network, Warner Bros., 20th Century Fox, New Line Cinema, MTV, Nickelodeon, A&E, Discovery, and Animal Planet, to name a few. Plowman has over 500 credits to date in live-action, animation, film, concert works and video games, and continues to compose music.

== Filmography ==
Year	Title	Director	Notes
2009	The Keeper	Keoni Waxman	—N/a
2009	A Dangerous Man	Keoni Waxman	—N/a
2012	Maximum Conviction	Keoni Waxman	—N/a
2013	Force of Execution	Keoni Waxman	—N/a
2017	Cartels	Keoni Waxman	—N/a
