= A Dangerous Man =

- Official movie poster
- Directed by: Keoni Waxman
- Written by: Keoni Waxman
- Produced by: Deboragh Gabler
- Starring: Steven Seagal; Daryl Shuttleworth; Mike Dopud; Jerry Wasserman; Byron Mann
- Cinematography: Nathan Wilson
- Edited by: Trevor Mirosh
- Music by: Michael Richard Plowman
- Production companies: Legacy Filmworks; Steamroller Productions; Voltage Pictures; Desert Road Productions
- Distributed by: Paramount Home Entertainment
- Release dates: 28 December 2009 (United Kingdom); 9 February 2010 (United States)
- Running time: 94 minutes
- Country: United States
- Language: English
- Budget: $6.5 million

A Dangerous Man is a 2009 American direct-to-DVD crime action film directed by Keoni Waxman. It stars Steven Seagal as an ex-soldier released from prison after spending six years locked up for a crime he did not commit.

== Plot ==
In Arizona, ex-Special Forces soldier Shane Daniels (Steven Seagal) saves his wife, Holly (Aidan Dee), from a car jacking and chases the mugger (Clay Virtue) away. The mugger later ends up dead, and Shane is the sole suspect. After being locked up for six years, Shane is released from jail due to new DNA evidence, which clears his name. Shane is released with an apology from the State of Arizona and a $300,000 settlement, but feels that it does not make up for his wasted life and the loss of his wife, who has left him, which leaves him bitter.

Off the coast of Seattle, a ship full of smuggled Chinese people is arriving. After it arrives, an old Chinese man is taken to a safehouse. Back in Arizona, within hours of being released to the streets, Shane stops at a liquor store and buys a bottle of bourbon. Back outside, two men attempt to rob Shane, but he beats up his two attackers and steals their car. Leaving the city, Shane takes to the road and stops at a rest stop along a lonely stretch of highway. There, he witnesses a state trooper pulling over a car containing two Chinese nationals. The Chinese nationals kill the state trooper and try to kill a couple of witnesses, a young man named Sergey (Jesse Hutch) and his friend Markov (Robin Nielsen). Shane is forced to intervene, kills one of the attackers and sends the other one, Mao (Byron Lawson), running off into the desert, but Markov is killed by one of the Chinese men. When Shane checks on the dead cop, he hears noise coming from the trunk of the Chinese national's car. Inside, he finds an unconscious woman and a duffel bag full of cash. Fearing that the cops will implicate him in the death of the trooper and knowing that the Chinese national will return with back-up, Shane takes the girl, the cash, and Sergey into the nearest small town, which is called Bellingham. Sergey admits that his father, Vlad (Vitaly Kravchenko), sells stolen cars.

When the woman, Tia (Marlaina Mah), regains consciousness, she begs Shane and Sergey not to turn her over to the cops or the Chinese. Tia tells Shane and Sergey that the cops in Bellingham killed her friends when she was kidnapped. The next morning, Shane has Sergey drop him and Tia off at a motel. Shane moves to a different hotel, for safety. In the second motel room, Tia explains to Shane that she was trying to get her uncle Kuan (Vincent Cheng) into the USA. She was contacted by someone who said they could help. She was told to show up alone at an abandoned mill in a remote place about 50 miles away from Bellingham, but she insisted on bringing some of her friends since it was the first time she and her contact were meeting. The man she met is a Chinese drug smuggler named Chen (Terry Chen) who told her he would help smuggle Kuan into the USA. However, Chen had her friends shot by Bellingham cops, and she was then forced into a room where another man was waiting. The man, known as the Colonel (Byron Mann), said he was waiting for Kuan's arrival, and that Tia was going to be held for ransom until the man got the information he needed from Kuan.

Sergeant Ritchie (Jerry Wasserman) and his henchman Clark (Mike Dopud), the two Bellingham cops who are working for Chen, go to Little Russia, Vlad's restaurant, and ask Vlad if he knows where Shane is, but Vlad turns them away, even threatening to cut Ritchie's testicles off. Meanwhile, two Chinese men break into the motel room where Shane and Tia are staying, but Shane kills them, and he and Tia escape. Outside Little Russia, Tia tells Shane that Kuan will be arriving before the day is out, and she is worried about what will happen to him. Inside, the bartender is not willing to tell Shane where Vlad and Sergey are, so Shane is forced to beat him up, and demand that he take him to Vlad. They arrive at Vlad's house, he is grateful that Shane saved Sergey's life and agrees to help Shane and Tia. Ritchie, Clark, and some Chinese men arrive at Vlad's house and a firefight takes place. After finishing off the last of Chen's men, Shane, Tia, Sergey, and Vlad leave to try to rescue Kuan from the Colonel.

At the abandoned mill, the Colonel has taken over the place, having his men plant bombs all over the site and kill all of Chen's men except for Chen. He is keeping Chen alive until Chen's men arrive with Kuan. When he finally arrives, the Colonel's men kill Kuan's two escorts. Gunfire erupts between the Colonel's men and Shane's group. In the midst of the gunfire, Tia gets shot. Shane covers the wound, and tells Sergey to watch over her. Shane returns to fighting the Colonel's men, and Sergey lifts Tia up and starts carrying her to safety. Shane battles his way to the Colonel, who has Kuan as a hostage.

Shane and the Colonel open fire on each other, and they both run out of bullets. Shane brutally beats the Colonel up, and then gets Kuan out of there. The Colonel grabs a submachine gun, and leaves the room. Just as the Colonel is about to shoot Shane, Shane flips the switch and the bombs start detonating, and the Colonel is blown off of the catwalk he was on.

Vlad later makes sure Kuan can stay in the USA. Shane and Tia, having fallen for each other, set up home together in an isolated glacier-side mansion somewhere outside the USA.

== Cast ==
- Steven Seagal as Shane Daniels
- Marlaina Mah as Tia
- Mike Dopud as Officer Clark
- Byron Mann as The Colonel
- Jesse Hutch as Sergey
- Vitaly Kravchenko as Vladimir
- Byron Lawson as Mao
- Jerry Wasserman as Sergeant Ritchie
- Vincent Cheng as Uncle Kuan
- Aidan Dee as Holly Daniels
- Robin Nielsen as Markov
- Terry Chen as Chen

== Production ==
Filming began in 2009 with a release date scheduled after The Keeper.

Some of the filming was done in Canada and America; the film concludes with a shot of the Chateau Lake Louise, Baton Rouge, Louisiana and Atlanta, Georgia.
