= Claudiu Bleonț =

Romanian actor (born 1959)

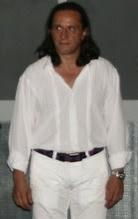
- Claudiu Bleonț
- Born: 27 August 1959 (age 67); Bucharest, Romania
- Education: Caragiale Academy of Theatrical Arts and Cinematography
- Occupation: Actor

Claudiu Bleonț (Romanian pronunciation: [klaˈudju ˈble̯ont͡s]; born 27 August 1959) is a Romanian film and theatre actor, comedian, television celebrity, and television presenter at TVR1, for the show Duminica în familie. He is known in Romania not only for acting, but also for his improvisation.

== Life and career ==
Born in Bucharest, Bleonț went to the German High School, and graduated from the I.L. Caragiale Institute of Theatre and Film Arts in Bucharest. Since then, he has played lead roles at many theatres in Romania, often preferring more classical productions. However, one of his most well-known theatre performances is as Romeo in a production of Shakespeare's Romeo and Juliet with the balcony scene replaced with a bathtub. He has received several national awards for his theatre work.

He has since appeared in seventeen films, under many of the Romanian directors. He had a lead role in the film Un été inoubliable under the direction of Lucian Pintilie; the film was nominated for the Golden Palm at the 1994 Cannes Film Festival.

He married Beatrice Bleonț, a stage director, in 1995; they have since divorced and since 2001 he has been married to Andra Negulescu, an actress.

In the 2003 film Boudica, Bleonț played the role of Suetonius' ADC. In 2005 he acted in Femeia visurilor, a Romanian film directed by Dan Pița. He appeared in Eva, which premiered at the Cannes Film Festival in 2010.

== Filmography ==
- Fata morgana (1981)
- Să mori rănit din dragoste de viață (1984)
- Dreptate în lanțuri (1984)
- Pas în doi (1985)
- Flames over Treasures (1988)
- Rochia albă de dantelă (1988)
- Autor Anonim (1989)
- An Unforgettable Summer (1995)
- Eva (2010) - Doctor
- A Good Man (2014) - Vladimir
- End of a Gun (2016) - Chauvin
- Hotel Transilvania (2012)- Dracula (Romanian version)
- The Lion King- Zazu (Romanian voice)
