= True Justice =

- Genre: Drama; Action; Crime
- Created by: Steven Seagal
- Written by: Steven Seagal (season 1); Keoni Waxman (season 2)
- Directed by: Keoni Waxman; Wayne Rose; Lauro Chartrand
- Starring: Steven Seagal
- Country of origin: United States
- Original language: English
- No. of seasons: 2
- No. of episodes: 26

Production
- Running time: 1 hour
- Production companies: Voltage Pictures, Steamroller Productions

Original release
- Network: 5USA & Reelz
- Release: July 6, 2011 – September 26, 2012

True Justice is an American television action series created by and starring Steven Seagal that ran for two seasons in 2011 and 2012. Seagal stars as Elijah Kane, the head of the "Special Investigation Unit", an undercover police task force, in Seattle, Washington.

== Cast ==
=== Main cast ===
Name	Portrayed by	Seasons	
Name	Portrayed by	1	2
Chief Elijah Kane	Steven Seagal	Main	
Detective Sarah Montgomery	Sarah Lind	Main	
Detective Andre Mason	William "Big Sleeps" Stewart	Main	Recurring
Detective Juliet Sanders	Meghan Ory	Main	
Detective Landon Radner	Warren Christie	Main	
CIA Agent Marcus Mitchell	Adrian Holmes	Recurring	Main
Mark Simms	Lochlyn Munro		Main
Johnny Garcia	Jesse Hutch		Main
Jessica Finch	Tanaya Beatty		Main

=== Supporting cast ===
Name	Portrayed by	Episodes
Sheriff Graves	Adrian Hough	12 episodes
Jordan Sparks	Elizabeth Thai	8 episodes
Edi "Edward" Gogol	Zak Santiago	8 episodes
Brad Gates	Kyle Cassie	6 episodes
Hiro	Alex Mallari Jr.	6 episodes
Castillo	Ty Olsson	6 episodes
Richard Lynch	Rick Ravanello	6 episodes
Anna Zemenko	Emilie Ullerup	5 episodes
Milan Saric	Mike Dopud	3 episodes
Thomas Madison (T.M.) Snow	Martin Cummins	3 episodes
Nikoli Putin	Gil Bellows	3 episodes
Tanaka	George Takei	2 episodes
Lisa Clayton	Tia Carrere	2 episodes

== Series continuity and setting ==
The series is notionally set in Seattle and the greater Puget Sound region, the Sheriff's Department being that of fictional Everett county, with headquarters in downtown Seattle.

Most Season one and two episodes feature plots involving an economically depressed near-to-Seattle waterfront community known as Camp Harmony, a historic World War II internment site located in what is now Puyallup, Washington. The community is portrayed as an eclectic mix of Native Americans, immigrants from east Asia, impoverished trailer-residing Caucasians, ex-convicts, and refugees from the aftermath of Hurricane Katrina.

Season one features Harmony's refugee Louisiana fishermen as integral to drug smuggling in supposedly difficult to navigate and labyrinthine waterways of the Puget Sound. Principal production and photography occurred in Vancouver, British Columbia. Second unit shots and stock footage from Seattle are used to provide localized context between scenes.

== Episodes ==
Season	Episodes	Originally released	
Season	Episodes	First released	Last released
1	13	July 6, 2011	September 28, 2011
2	13	July 4, 2012	September 26, 2012

=== Season 1 (2011) ===
No. overall	No. in season	Title	Directed by	Written by	Original release date
1	1	"Deadly Crossing"	Keoni Waxman	Steven Seagal	July 6, 2011
2	2	"From Russia with Drugs"	Keoni Waxman	Steven Seagal & Joe Halpin	July 13, 2011
3	3	"Black Magic"	Keoni Waxman	Steven Seagal & Joe Halpin	July 20, 2011
4	4	"Dark Vengeance"	Keoni Waxman	Steven Seagal & Joe Halpin	July 27, 2011
5	5	"Toxic E"	Wayne Rose	Steven Seagal & Joe Halpin	August 3, 2011
6	6	"Street Wars"	Wayne Rose	Steven Seagal & Joe Halpin	August 10, 2011
7	7	"Divided They Fall"	Wayne Rose	Steven Seagal & Joe Halpin	August 17, 2011
8	8	"Lethal Justice"	Wayne Rose	Steven Seagal & Joe Halpin	August 24, 2011
9	9	"Yakuza"	Wayne Rose	Steven Seagal & Joe Halpin	August 31, 2011
10	10	"Brotherhood"	Wayne Rose	Steven Seagal & Joe Halpin	September 7, 2011
11	11	"Urban Warfare"	Keoni Waxman	Steven Seagal & Joe Halpin	September 14, 2011
12	12	"Diamonds in the Rough"	Keoni Waxman	Steven Seagal & Joe Halpin	September 21, 2011
13	13	"Payback"	Lauro Chartrand	Steven Seagal & Joe Halpin	September 28, 2011

=== Season 2 (sub-title "The Ghost", 2012) ===
No. overall	No. in season	Title	Directed by	Written by	Original release date
14	1	"Vengeance Is Mine"	Keoni Waxman	Keoni Waxman	July 4, 2012
15	2	"The Untouchables"	Keoni Waxman	Keoni Waxman	July 11, 2012
16	3	"Blood Alley"	Wayne Rose	Richard Beattie & Keoni Waxman	July 18, 2012
17	4	"All In"	Wayne Rose	Richard Beattie & Keoni Waxman	July 25, 2012
18	5	"Dirty Money"	Lauro Chartrand	Richard Beattie & Keoni Waxman	August 1, 2012
19	6	"Violence of Action"	Lauro Chartrand	Richard Beattie & Keoni Waxman	August 8, 2012
20	7	"Toys in the Attic"	Wayne Rose	Richard Beattie & Keoni Waxman	August 15, 2012
21	8	"Angel of Death"	Wayne Rose	Richard Beattie & Keoni Waxman	August 22, 2012
22	9	"The Conversation"	Keoni Waxman	Richard Beattie & Keoni Waxman	August 29, 2012
23	10	"Dead Drop"	Keoni Waxman	Richard Beattie & Keoni Waxman	September 5, 2012
24	11	"The Cut-Out Man"	Keoni Waxman	David C. Bernat & Keoni Waxman	September 12, 2012
25	12	"Fired"	Wayne Rose	Richard Beattie & Keoni Waxman	September 19, 2012
26	13	"The Shot"	Wayne Rose	Richard Beattie & Keoni Waxman	September 26, 2012

== Release ==
The series first aired on Nitro, a TV station in Spain, starting on May 12, 2011. It premiered in the UK on 5 USA, with the first episode broadcast on 20 July 2011. The series started airing on ReelzChannel on March 30, 2012.

On April 26, 2012, U.S. broadcaster ReelzChannel renewed the series for a second season of 13 episodes. For the second season, the supporting cast changed slightly and had a new writing team. The second season is subtitled "The Ghost", the name of the villain that the main characters are pursuing. 5USA also broadcast the second season, starting on 4 July 2012.

Some episodes were made available in Poland on Cyfrowy Polsat VOD, between 30 September and 31 October 2011.

The series is gradually being released on DVD and Blu-ray, two episodes at a time, edited into single "movies" (see below). A box set of the first season was released in Australia by Paramount Home Entertainment on December 8, 2011.

=== DVDs ===
True Justice was gradually released as a series of DVD (and some Blu-ray) "movies" in the UK, Germany and The Netherlands, with each disc editing together two episodes. Deadly Crossing was also released in Mexico by Videomax under their Gussi label. The releases were:

1. Deadly Crossing (Season One, episodes one and two)
2. Dark Vengeance (Season One, episodes three and four)
3. Street Wars (Season One, episodes five and six)
4. Lethal Justice (Season One, episodes seven and eight)
5. Brotherhood (Season One, episodes nine and ten)
6. Urban Warfare (Season One, episodes eleven and twelve)
7. Payback (German DVD exclusive release) (Season One, episode thirteen)
8. Vengeance is Mine (Season Two, episodes one and two)
9. Blood Alley (Season Two, episodes three and four)
10. Violence of Action (Season Two, episodes five and six)
11. Angel of Death (Season Two, episodes seven and eight)
12. Dead Drop (Season Two, episodes nine and ten)
13. One Shot One Life (German DVD exclusive release) (Season Two, episodes eleven as a bonus feature and twelve and thirteen)

== Accolades ==
Year	Festival	Category	Award	Recipient	Result	Ref.
2012	Leo Awards	Leo	Best Stunt Coordination in a Dramatic Series	Lauro Chartrand (stunt coordinator)	Won	
2012	Leo Awards	Leo	Best Direction in a Dramatic Series	Lauro Chartrand (director)	Nominated	
2012	UBCP/ACTRA Awards, Vancouver	UBCP Award	Best Stunt	Maja Aro / ACTRA Toronto Performers	Nominated	
