= Maximum Conviction =

- Official movie poster
- Directed by: Keoni Waxman
- Written by: Richard Beattie
- Starring: Steven Seagal; Steve Austin
- Music by: Michael Richard Plowman
- Production company: Voltage Pictures
- Release dates: November 6, 2012 (USA); January 12, 2013 (Japan)
- Running time: 97 minutes
- Country: United States
- Language: English

Maximum Conviction is a 2012 action thriller starring Steven Seagal and Steve Austin and directed by Keoni Waxman. The film follows a former black ops operative and his partner decommissioning an old prison, but are soon dealing with mercenaries going after two female prisoners.

== Plot ==
Former black ops operative Cross, his partner Manning, and their group have been hired to oversee and orchestrate the decommissioning of a secret military penal facility, and organize the transport of the inmates to their new civilian prison.

Cross shows who's boss early on by beating up a large inmate who steps out of line, while Manning is given the task of running the prison's garbage facility. The day gets worse when a rolled up note is found that was accidentally dropped by an inmate, detailing times and locations for an attack on the facility.

Cross, on his way back to the prison from running an errand, and Manning, still dealing with that garbage facility, are suddenly involved in a foothold situation as Chris Blake and his mercenaries, posing as marshals, take over the complex.

Blake and his men are after the two newest inmates—Samantha Mendez and Charlotte Walker—for their own purposes—Blake wants the information that is in an implant that is inside of Samantha, who is a CIA courier, because it could lead to a lot of money for Blake, and it turns out that Charlotte is working for Blake. It is up to Cross, Manning, and their team to stop Blake and his men.

MP Fields turns out to be a traitor and kills two of the others. Blake cuts off Warden Samuel's finger to force him to know where the detainees are. Manning is attacked Collins and his team. He manages to kill two and flee the area. Cross returns to the complex and kills two of Blake's men. Blake holds Warden Samuels hostage, forcing him to do anything so Blake can reach Charlotte. Later on Charlotte escapes as she wants to get paid. Eventually both sides meet up. Blake thinks he has Cross and Manning outgunned and then flees the scene, with Cross pursuing him. Manning catches up with Collins and kills him by impaling him on a bench. Samantha kills Charlotte, while the remnants of Blake's mercenaries including MP Fields are killed by Bradley and the others. Cross and Blake exchange gunshots till both run out of ammo. Blake attempts to strike Cross only to be thrashed around and badly injured. Cross talks to him about being a warrior in which Blake replies 'well that's me I'm the fucking bad guy'. Cross says he is the good guy then hurls Blake into the laser trip wires, killing him. He reunites with Samantha and Manning. He jokes that 'in ain't over till we're dead'.

== Cast ==
- Steven Seagal as Cross - Tactical Genius
- Steve Austin as Manning - Weapons Expert
- Michael Paré as Chris Blake - Antagonist and leader of Mercenaries
- Steph Song as Samantha Mendez - Inmate who works for CIA
- Aliyah O'Brien as Charlotte Walker - Inmate who works for Mercenaries
- Bren Foster as Bradley
- Michael Adamthwaite as Collins - Blake's Henchman
- Dean Redman as Jones
- Zak Santiago as Blake's henchman and former head of Security
- Ian Robison as The Prison Warden

== Background ==
In an interview with MTV, Seagal explained that he stuck with the story given to him, polished the overall plot and action scenes to be realistic as possible, and got along with Steve Austin during the filming process.

== Critical reception ==
Eoin Friel of The Action Elite said: "Maximum Conviction has plenty of flaws and if you're looking for lots of depth, you won't find it here however, if you're looking for a slam bang, ass kicking action movie with plenty of violence, great fight scenes and one-liners then you're in for a treat." Lukas Spathis of Voices From The Balcony felt the film's script had "weak" characterization with mediocre performances, critiquing that Austin's portrayal of Manning showed some "degree of enthusiasm" despite a low "engagement level" to the role, and criticized Waxman's filmmaking for being "pretty subpar" in the action sequences, calling it "a generic and subpar VOD action outing with little to make it stand out besides one sequence with Steve Austin in the latter half of the movie. As someone who has seen a couple of Waxman's movies: he's not a good director. Stay away and look up the kitchen fight scene on YouTube."
