= The Keeper (2009 film) =

- DVD Cover
- Directed by: Keoni Waxman
- Written by: Paul A. Birkett
- Produced by: Steven Seagal; Phillip Goldfine
- Starring: Steven Seagal; Luce Rains; Kisha Sierra; Arron Shiver; Liezl Carstens; Brian Keith Gamble; Angela Serrano
- Cinematography: Nathan Wilson
- Edited by: Michael J. Duthie
- Music by: Philip White
- Distributed by: 20th Century Fox Home Entertainment
- Release dates: October 3, 2009 (Japan); October 19, 2009 (United States)
- Running time: 94 minutes
- Country: United States
- Language: English
- Budget: $10,000,000

The Keeper is a 2009 American action film starring Steven Seagal and directed by Keoni Waxman. It is the first collaboration between Seagal and director Waxman; the two have subsequently made eight more films and two seasons of a limited TV series together.

== Plot ==
Grizzled L.A. cop Roland Sallinger (Steven Seagal) is shot by his corrupt partner during a raid. After recovering, an old friend named Connor Wells (Steph DuVall) hires him to be a bodyguard for his daughter Nikita (Liezl Carstens).

Roland escorts Nikita to a night club so she can dance with her boyfriend Mason Silver (Arron Shiver), who is a boxer. Roland notices Jason Cross (Luce Raines), a dangerous man.

Later, Mason betrays Connor and leads Nikita into an ambush, with Roland secretly following. Roland kills some kidnappers, but the rest escape with Nikita.

Cross, who arranged the kidnapping, contacts Connor. Cross demands the deeds to Connor's property, which contains a rich uranium deposit. Connor agrees to exchange the deeds for Nikita at Cross Ranch, then informs Roland.

At Cross Ranch, Connor hands Cross the deeds, but they are fake. Roland kills Cross's men, and Connor shoots Cross. A SWAT team arrives and takes Cross away. Nikita is reunited with Connor.

== Cast ==
- Steven Seagal as Rolland Sallinger
- Luce Rains as Jason Cross
- Kisha Sierra as Allegra
- Liezl Carstens as Nikita Wells
- Arron Shiver as Mason Silver
- Brian Keith Gamble as Trevor Johnson
- Angela Serrano as Asian Bare Breast / Massage Girl
