= Flight of Fury =

- DVD cover
- Directed by: Michael Keusch
- Screenplay by: Steven Seagal; Joe Halpin
- Story by: Joe Halpin
- Produced by: Pierre Spengler
- Starring: Steven Seagal; Steve Toussaint; Angus MacInnes; Mark Bazeley
- Cinematography: Geoffrey Hall
- Edited by: Jonathan Brayley
- Music by: Barry Taylor
- Production companies: Castel Films; Clubdeal
- Distributed by: Sony Pictures Home Entertainment
- Release date: February 20, 2007
- Running time: 98 minutes
- Country: United States
- Language: English
- Budget: $12 million

Flight of Fury is a 2007 American action film directed by Michael Keusch, and produced by Pierre Spengler. The film stars Steven Seagal, who also co-wrote the screenplay with Joe Halpin, from a story by Halpin. The film co-stars Steve Toussaint, Angus MacInnes, and Mark Bazeley. The film was released direct-to-DVD in the United States on February 20, 2007.

== Plot ==
Air Force pilot John Sands (Steven Seagal) has been wrongfully imprisoned in a military detention center where his memory is to be chemically wiped out. His superiors feel threatened by the knowledge he gained from his assignments to operations deemed too sensitive for regular intelligence services. He escapes the detention facility.

A top secret Air Force Stealth Bomber known as the X-77, capable of going anywhere undetected, is stolen by corrupt Air Force pilot Ratcher (Steve Toussaint). General Tom Barnes (Angus MacInnes), Sands' former commander, hears that Sands was arrested after taking down a group of men robbing a rest stop. It is revealed that Sands was Ratcher's trainer. Barnes sends Sands to northern Afghanistan with fellow pilot Rick Jannick (Mark Bazeley) to recover the X-77, promising Sands that he will be a free man if he succeeds. Barnes has Admiral Frank Pendleton (Tim Woodward), who is on an aircraft carrier in the Gulf of Arabia, keep a team of pilots on standby just in case an air attack needs to be launched on the compound where the X-77 has been hidden; if it isn't recovered they will destroy it.

Before Sands and Jannick arrive in Afghanistan, a Navy SEAL team that was planted there to meet them is killed by a group of men led by Eliana Reed (Katie Jones). Eliana kidnaps Jannick, and she takes him to her boss, Peter Stone (Vincenzo Nicoli), the man who paid Ratcher $100 million to steal the X-77. In a village close to Stone's compound, Sands meets up with his contacts Jessica and Rojar (Alki David).

As it turns out, Stone was born to a Muslim mother and a British father. Stone had spent his childhood in the Middle East, but was educated at Oxford. Stone's mother was killed in an attack by U.S. troops during Desert Storm, and as a result, a vengeful Stone formed the Black Sunday terrorist group. It is revealed that Eliana is Stone's second in command. She trains with various guerrilla groups in the region, giving Stone the foundation he needs.

Now, Stone plans to use the X-77 and its pinpoint precision to drop two biological warfare bombs undetected, one of them on Europe and one of them on the United States. Stone plans to pay Ratcher another $100 million to fly the X-77 and drop the two bombs. Sands, Jessica, and Rojar, make plans to get into Stone's compound and launch an attack, but Stone has about 60 heavily armed mercenaries guarding the compound. Rojar starts a gunfight between the terrorists while Sands rescues Jannick. After a feud about the money, Ratcher shoots and kills Stone.

Sands takes on a few of the terrorists by hand as Jessica shoots and kills Eliana. Jannick catches Ratcher while Sands and Jessica leave in the X-77. Ratcher manages to shoot Jannick and get up in the air in a F16. After a brief dogfight, Sands manages to shoot Ratcher down and returns home.

== Cast ==
- Steven Seagal as John Sands
- Steve Toussaint as Col. Ratcher
- Angus MacInnes as General Tom Barnes
- Mark Bazeley as Captain Richard Jannick
- Ciera Payton as Jessica
- Alki David as Rojar
- Tim Woodward as Admiral Frank Pendleton
- Vincenzo Nicoli as Peter Stone
- Katie Jones as Eliana Reed
- Gary Cooper as Commander Bud Jackson
- Barton Sidles as Captain "Fox" Hinkle
- Cristina Teodorescu as Lisa, Pendleton's Operational Soldier
- Rares George Panfil as Williams
- Noah Lee Margetts as Eliana's Soldier
- Karen David as Flanders, Barnes's Operational Soldier

== Production ==
It is set and was filmed in Bucharest, Romania across 60 days between March 1 and April 30, 2006.

When asked about the film later Seagal said "Sometimes you get in with people who say they have $30m to make a movie and they steal $25m and give you $5m to make the movie. And that's why you see movies that are just **** because the financiers have stolen everything."

== Attribution controversy ==
Though the screenplay is credited exclusively to Seagal and frequent collaborator Joe Halpin (and the story is credited to Halpin), many elements of Flight of Fury make it appear to be an unofficial remake of the 1998 film Black Thunder. The scenario, characters, and even character names and specific scenes are often identical, but Black Thunder writer William C. Martell did not receive credit for his original screenplay, instead receiving only a "special thanks" at the end of the credits. Martell claims he was not even aware of Flight of Fury's similarity to his own script until he saw it on IMDb, though he notes, "Someone involved has now contacted me, and I'm sure everything is going to turn out okay. Just some communications SNAFUs when rights were sold and resold." No further information on discussions between Martell and the makers of Flight of Fury appears to be publicly available; IMDb still lists Martell as "special thanks" in the listed credits of Flight of Fury.

== Critical reception ==
Overall critical reaction was negative. Steven Seagal was praised because of his weight loss, but the film itself was highly criticized for its use of stock footage. The film has no rating on Rotten Tomatoes.

Seagalogy author Vern ranked Flight of Fury as one of Seagal's weakest efforts, noting, "In some ways the movie seems more competent than the last one, 'Attack Force'...but let's just say most people won’t find this one of the better Seagal pictures."

Howard Stern negatively reviewed and ridiculed the film on his radio show.

Despite negative reviews, the film was popular on DVD.

== Home media ==
The DVD was released in Region 1 in the United States on February 20, 2007, and also on Region 2 in the United Kingdom on 16 April 2007. It was distributed by Sony Pictures Home Entertainment.
