= Homesick =

Homesick may refer to:

- Homesickness, longing to return home

== Entertainment ==
=== Albums ===
- Homesick (A Day to Remember album), 2009, or the title track
- Homesick (Deacon Blue album), 2001
- Homesick (Chris Price album)
- Homesick (Sea Girls album), 2022
- Homesick, a 2015 album by Matrixxman
- Homesick (EP), a 2018 EP by Trevor Daniel

=== Songs ===
- "Homesick" (Brutal Truth song), from their 1996 album Kill Trend Suicide
- "Homesick" (Catfish and the Bottlemen song), from their 2014 album, The Balcony
- Homesick (The Cheetah Girls song)
- "Homesick" (The Cure song), from their 1989 album Disintegration
- "Homesick" (Dua Lipa song), 2017
- "Homesick" (MercyMe song), on Undone
- "Homesick" (Noah Kahan song), from his 2022 album Stick Season, later re-recorded with English singer Sam Fender
- "Homesick" (Pennywise song), from their 1993 album Unknown Road
- "Homesick" (Soul Asylum song), from their 1992 album Grave Dancers Union
- "Homesick" (Stan Walker song), from his 2010 album From the Inside Out
- "Homesick" (Steven Seagal song), from his 2006 album Mojo Priest
- "Homesick" (Thirsty Merc song), 2008
- "Homesick" (Train song), from their 1998 album Train
- "Homesick" (The Vines song), from their 2002 album Highly Evolved
- "Homesickness" (Donovan song), from HMS Donovan
- "Homesick", a song by Irving Berlin
- "Homesick", a song by Kings of Convenience from their 2004 album Riot on an Empty Street
- Homesick (Kane Brown song), from his album Experiment
- "Homesick", a song by Madison Beer from her 2021 album Life Support

=== Television and film ===
- Homesick (1928 film), a 1928 American comedy film directed by Henry Lehrman
- Home Sick, a 2007 horror film by Adam Wingard
- Homesick (2015 film), a 2015 Norwegian film
- "Homesick" (Only Fools and Horses), a 1983 episode of the BBC sitcom Only Fools and Horses
- "Homesick", a Season 11 episode of the American police procedural drama NCIS

=== Books ===
- Homesick: A Memoir (Sela Ward memoir), by actress Sela Ward
- Homesick: My Own Story (1982), by Jean Fritz
- Homesick (2025 book), a 2025 book by Peter Apps
