= Robin Russin =

American dramatist

- Born: Robin Uriel Russin; Wyoming, United States
- Education: Harvard University; University of Oxford (Rhodes Scholarship); Rhode Island School of Design; University of California, Los Angeles (MFA)
- Alma mater: University of California, Los Angeles
- Occupations: Screenwriter; Director; Playwright; Author; Educator
- Spouse: Sarah Russin
- Children: 2
- Writing career
- Years active: 1990s–present
- Period: 1990s–present
- Notable works: On Deadly Ground; 2 Hearts; Screenplay: Writing the Picture; Naked Playwriting; Painted Eggs

Robin Russin is an American screenwriter, director, playwright, author and educator.

== Education ==
Robin Uriel Russin was educated at Harvard, Oxford (which he attended on a Rhodes Scholarship), the Rhode Island School of Design, and UCLA, where he received his MFA in screenwriting. Russin taught screenwriting at UCLA in their undergraduate and graduate film departments as well as their Professional Program from 1994 to 2002. He is currently Professor of Dramatic Writing and Chair of the Department of Theatre, Film, and Digital Production at the University of California, Riverside, where he has also served as Director of the MFA for Creative Writing and Writing for the Performing Arts.

== Career ==
Russin has written and directed for film, theater, television and various national publications, including Scr(i)pt Magazine. Additionally, he co-authored Screenplay: Writing the Picture and Naked Playwriting (both published by Silman-James Press). Screenplay: Writing the Picture was reviewed by Lew Hunter, co-chair of UCLA's screenwriting department, as the "best book about screenwriting and being a screenwriter ever written."

Among Russin's entertainment credits are the #1 box office feature On Deadly Ground, the eco-thriller starring Steven Seagal and Michael Caine, and 2 Hearts, starring Jacob Elordi and Radha Mitchell. Many of his other feature spec scripts have been either bought or put under option by both studio and independent producers.

Russin has been a producer on both independent and TV movies, and in television, he wrote, produced and directed numerous segments and specials for America's Most Wanted, The New Detectives, and The Prosecutors. He was Senior Producer of the hour-long ABC primetime series, Vital Signs. In 2015 he sold his original pilot and series bible about King David to ABC, which became the basis for the ABC 2016 prime time one-hour series, Of Kings and Prophets, for which Russin was consultant. In 2017 Russin directed the feature film, When I Sing, about independent singer-songwriter Linda Chorney's journey to the Grammy Awards, and co-starring Chris Mulkey. When I Sing won the People's Choice Award at the 2018 Hollywood Reel Independent Film Festival, and the Remi Special Jury Award for best low budget feature at the 2018 Worldfest Houston Film Festival, among many other awards. In 2021 Robin directed the independent feature film The Anxiety of Laughing for Disability Media Network, from a script by his former MFA student Andrew Justvig, who has cerebral palsy. In spite of its low budget, it has been selected by more than a dozen international festivals, and won many top honors. Russin is also Writer and Associate Producer of the documentary series, Rescuers: Last Chance Project, directed by Michael King, about the diplomats and others who helped save Jewish lives during WWII and have been recognized as The Righteous Among The Nations by Yad Vashem World Holocaust Remembrance Center in Israel.

Among his plays is Painted Eggs, which was reviewed by The Los Angeles Times as "ambitious, heart-felt and hypnotic," and Dramalogue called "a glorious treat and a wonderful lesson in love." He regularly writes and directs for the Ruskin Group Theatre in Santa Monica, California, which premiered his play "The Face in the Reeds" in 2014, and which had a sold-out four month run. He also has directed numerous theatrical productions, including The Merchant of Venice at the Barbara and Art Culver Center for the Arts, and written extensively about the play in Shofar: An Interdisciplinary Journal of Jewish Studies: "The Triumph of the Golden Fleece: Women, Money, Religion, and Power in Shakespeare’s The Merchant of Venice". He also writes occasionally for the Jewish Women's Theater, a salon ensemble group, where he is also an artist-in-residence.

While at UCLA, Russin was Story Editor on the campus sitcom Good News, Bad News, and was awarded two Jack Nicholson Awards for excellence in screenwriting. He also directed several short films, was twice a finalist in Chanticleer's "Discovery" program for new directors, and has won or been a finalist in the ScriptPIMP, Final Draft Big Break, TVWriter People's Pilot, The Movie Deal, Award Winning Screenwriters, Northwest Film Forum, Austin Film Festival, Prague Film Festival, Manchester Film Festiva, Worldfest Houston, Dances With Films, and other competitions.

== Personal life ==
Born and raised in Wyoming and Italy, Russin currently lives in Los Angeles. He also works as a sculptor, and has taught art, literature and art history. He is married to Sarah Russin, the Executive Director of LACE (Los Angeles Contemporary Exhibitions). They have two children, Olivia and Benjamin Russin. Russin also has a second-degree blackbelt in kenpo-jujitsu.
