= William C. Heine =

Canadian writer (1919–1991)

- Born: 21 November 1919; Saint John, New Brunswick, Canada
- Died: 1991
- Occupation: Journalist
- Writing career
- Genre: Science fiction Non-fiction

William C. Heine (1919–1991) was a Canadian writer, best known for The Last Canadian, a science fiction novel filmed as The Patriot starring Steven Seagal. Heine was also editor-in-chief of the London Free Press, London, Ontario, Canada. He established the William C. Heine Fellowship for International Media Studies at the University of Western Ontario.

== Biography ==
William C. Heine left New Brunswick in 1939 to spend six years in the Canadian Army and RCAF. He graduated from the University of Western Ontario in 1949, Joined the London Free Press as a reporter, spent a decade on the paper's business side, and for seventeen years was editor-in-chief. Active in international journalist organizations, he travelled widely in North America, including the Arctic, and in Europe, North Africa, the Middle East, and Asia. He is the author of two novels and several non-fiction books.

In the summer of 1968, Heine became chair of the Division of Communications of the United Church of Canada in an attempt to restore the profitability of the Ryerson Press or "dispose of its assets." In 1970, the Ryerson Press was sold to McGraw-Hill Canada. The company is known in Canada as McGraw-Hill Ryerson.

== Bibliography ==
=== Novels ===
- The Last Canadian (1974) (US titles: Death Wind and The Last American) (filmed as: The Patriot)
- The Swordsman (1980) (aka The Sea Lord)

=== Non-fiction ===
- Shunpiker's Choice (1968) – Collection of columns and reflections by the then-editor of the London Free Press on topics from travel to family to the Vietnam War.
- Shunpiker Afar (1970) – More columns and reflections by the then-editor of the London Free Press.
- Journalism Ethics: A Case Book (1975) – Used at the University of Western Ontario.
- Historic Ships of the World (1977) – This book describes vessels from all over the world that were saved, restored, and preserved as living histories of the sea and of wars at sea. The author describes each vessel as she was in her prime - 'Great Britain' on the trans-Atlantic passenger run, 'USS Constitution' fighting British frigates in the War of 1812, 'St Roch' twice making the North-West Passage during World War II - relates the ship historically to her time and to other ship designs, tells how she came to be preserved, and in what port she now has her final anchorage, in a non-technical but informative text. The history of each ship, and how she looks today, is illustrated with more than 120 photographs, including eight pages of colour. Ships include:- Aurora, HMS Belfast, Cog of Bremen, Cutty Sark, Falls of Clyde, HMCS Haida, USS North Carolina, U-505, HMS Victory, Buffell, Viking Ships, USS Yorktown, etc. 156 pages.
- Shunpiker's People: Along the Back Roads of the World (1982) – More columns and reflections by the then-editor of the London Free Press.
- Kooks and Dukes, Counts and No-Accounts: Why Newspapers Do What They Do (1986) – The author pulls no punches in describing the inevitable friction in police-press relations, the threat of libel, etc.,. Heine's musings on the newspaper business are punctuated by lively and sometimes hilarious anecdotes of anonymous callers, irate advertisers, Nazi goon squads, and rivalries in the newsroom. This is compulsory reading for media professionals and aspirants. Illustrated by b/w photos and full-page caricature drawings by "Ting."
- 96 Years in the Royal Navy (1987) – The astonishing story of Halifax-born Admiral of the Fleet Sir Provo Wallis who joined the RN at the age of four and served for ninety-six years. Much about the action between HMS Shannon and USS Chesapeake off Boston, June 1, 1813. Chapter 1, French Prisoner at Fourteen; Chapter 2, Arrogance on the High Seas; Chapter 3, Kill the Enemy - Save His Ship; Chapter 4, "Englishmen Still Know How to Fight"; Chapter 5, Halifax Church Services End Abruptly; Chapter 6, After the Battle - Misunderstandings; Chapter 7, U.S Rationalizations - Explosion Caused Defeat; Chapter 8, Jos'h Warburton - Executed at the Fore Yard Arm; Chapter 9, Typical American Generosity at Boston; Chapter 10, Grounded in the Straits of Canso; Chapter 11 "Sheltered in Blanket Bay, Buried Like a Sailor."
