= The Patriot (1998 film) =

1998 American action thriller film

- Official DVD cover
- Directed by: Dean Semler
- Written by: M. Sussman; John Kingswell
- Based on: The Last Canadian by William C. Heine
- Produced by: Howard Baldwin; Patrick Choi; Nile Niami; Steven Seagal; Julius R. Nasso
- Starring: Steven Seagal; Gailard Sartain; L.Q. Jones; Camilla Belle
- Cinematography: Stephen F. Windon
- Edited by: Derek Brechin
- Music by: Stephen Edwards
- Production companies: Interlight Pictures; Baldwin/Cohen Productions; Seagal/Nasso Productions
- Distributed by: Buena Vista Home Entertainment (Note: Distributed under the Touchstone Home Video banner.)
- Release dates: July 10, 1998 (worldwide); February 6, 1999 (U.S.)
- Running time: 86 minutes
- Country: United States
- Language: English
- Budget: $20–35 million

The Patriot is a 1998 American action thriller film directed by Dean Semler. Starring Steven Seagal, the film is loosely based on the novel The Last Canadian by William C. Heine. Seagal's first direct-to-video film, it features him as a local doctor and former immunologist who races against time to find a cure for an active viral outbreak, the origins of which trace back to a militia leader who injected himself with a deadly virus.

The film was released worldwide on July 10, 1998 and in the United States on February 6, 1999.

== Plot ==
Near the town of Ennis, Montana, local doctor and former government research immunologist Wesley McClaren who has an interest in herbal medicine and is also a weapons and self-defense expert, is called to a hospital when people start dying from an unknown but very deadly disease. He determines that the cause is a highly dangerous airborne virus and calls in a Biological Response team, who seal off the town while doctors start treating sufferers with a vaccine. Unfortunately for them, several have already died.

The source of the virus is traced to a local self-styled rebel militia leader, Floyd Chisholm, who has given himself up after a long siege and has been arrested on weapons charges. In court, having ingested the virus himself (believing that he also possesses the vaccine) he spits at the judge, and starts the rapid spread of the disease.

Floyd's militia followers, who have been allowed to go free, attack the prison and rescue Floyd. They then proceed to invade and besiege the hospital, with much loss of life, and take medical personnel hostage including Wesley and his daughter Holly. But too late, they realize that the vaccine they were seeking at the hospital is the same as the one they possess which only delays the effect of the deadly virus. Working at gunpoint, Wesley takes a sample of Holly's blood; it shows that Holly has been infected, but somehow her body is fighting it off. Wesley and Holly contrive to escape and travel to a farm where Holly's grandfather lives. Wesley takes a blood sample from his friend Dr. Ann White Cloud, and realizes that her body is also fighting off the infection.

Wesley and Ann gain access to a secret underground laboratory where Wesley used to work, where they hope to come up with a cure. Wesley finds out why Ann and Holly are not being affected by the virus: they have been drinking tea made with a specific wild herb that is known to Native American healers.

Back at the home, Wesley and Holly are captured by the militia and taken at the hospital, but he manages to kill Floyd and disable the other soldiers. As soon as the biological protection team learn of the cure, they go out and pick all the flowers they can find and drop them by helicopter over the town, telling the people to boil them and drink the liquid.

== Cast ==
- Steven Seagal as Dr. Wesley McClaren
- Gailard Sartain as Floyd Chisholm
- L. Q. Jones as Frank
- Silas Weir Mitchell as Pogue
- Camilla Belle as Holly McClaren
- Dan Beene as Dr. Richard Bach
- Damon Collazo as Lieutenant Johnson
- Whitney Yellow Robe as Dr. Ann White Cloud
- Brad Leland as Bob "Big Bob"
- Molly McClure as Molly
- Philip Winchester as Young Militiaman
- Douglas Sebern as Judge Tomkins
- Ross Loney as Clem
- Bernard O'Connor as Dr. Tom Hergot
- Leonard Mountain Chief as Grandpa McClaren
- R.J. Burns as Navy Captain
- Robert Harvey as Colonel Harvey
- Ron Andrews as Radioman
- Jeff Tillotson as Private Benson
- Don Peterson as T.S. Soldier #1
- Cory Brown as T.S. Soldier #2
- Tom Vanek as Roadblock Sentry
- Scott Wetsel as FBI Agent
- Dillinger Steele as US Marshal
- Gene E. Carlstrom as Old Rancher
- Ayako Fujitani as McClaren's Assistant (credited as Ayako Seagal)
- Kelcie Beene as Holly's Friend #1
- Callie Strozzi as Holly's Friend #2
- Stephen Jensen as ATF Agent #3

== Production ==
In May 1997, it was reported that Steven Seagal would star in The Patriot, a $35 million independently produced action film written and directed by Paul Mones. The film marked Seagal's first leading role after completing his four picture deal with Warner Bros. Pictures. Mones prior credits included the Jean-Claude Van Damme films Double Team and The Quest. In September of that year however, it was reported that Academy Award winning cinematographer Dean Semler following his directorial debut on Firestorm with Mones' script to be co-written by David Ayer.

The film was reportedly originally intended as a theatrical release worldwide, but it was ultimately released direct-to-video in America with select countries like Spain in 1998 seeing it as a theatrical release, the first Seagal film to skip most theaters.

The Patriot was shot over eight weeks in Ennis and Virginia City, Montana, and for three days on the campus of Montana State University. Filming was briefly halted to remove snow from the ground during shooting in Virginia City, to maintain continuity.

Shooting took place from September through November 1997.

The screenplay is credited to M. Sussman and John Kingswell (neither has any other film credit of any kind). Several writers, including David Ayer and Paul Mones were rumored to be working on the script prior to its release; Mones was ultimately credited as a producer. Though the movie is credited as an adaptation of William C. Heine's novel The Last Canadian, it shares virtually no similarities with the novel except the idea of a deadly virus. No character names, events, or even locations appear in both the book and the film.

The film is Seagal's only effort to date in which he co-stars with his daughter, actress Ayako Fujitani, and is notable for an extremely low amount of action scenes compared to Seagal's other work.

== Release ==
The Patriot was shown at the 1998 American Film Market in Santa Monica, California from February 26 - March 4, 1998.

The film premiered on HBO on February 6, 1999 after failed attempts to secure theatrical distribution. It was noted that HBO typically only pays a maximum of $1.75 million for films that can't secure theatrical releases which was contrasted against the film's estimated $25 million and $35 million budget. A home video release followed on June 15, 1999 provided by Buena Vista who held all home media and television rights after the film's HBO premiere.

Remaining rights in certain international territories were held by Columbia TriStar Motion Picture Group.

== Reception ==
=== Critical response ===
The film has received generally negative reviews.

David Nusair of Reel Film Reviews called it "dull" and criticized its lack of action (he claims, "Out of a 90 minute movie, there's maybe 10 minutes of actual Seagal hand-to-hand combat") and unwelcome political messages. Seagalogy author Vern argues that "in many ways The Patriot is an admirable effort," noting "The production values and acting are better than some of Seagal's subsequent movies," but going on to point out that due to its "ridiculously low action quotient it is a least-favorite of many Seagal fans." As of 2 October 2014, the film has a 22% "rotten" critics rating on Rotten Tomatoes (based on 9 reviews).
