= Blood in the sand =

Blood in the sand or Blood on the sand may refer to:

- "Blood in the Sand", a Season 3 episode of Steven Seagal: Lawman
- Blood in the Sand, a book by Stephen Bronner
- Blood in the Sand, a song on the From Dusk till Dawn: The Series soundtrack
- Living on the Edge – Blood in the Sand, a TV series produced by Chris Terrill
- Blood in the Sand of Justice, a novel by Dire Tladi
- 50 Cent: Blood on the Sand, a third-person shooter video game
