= Pistol Whipped =

2008 American action film

- Official movie poster
- Directed by: Roel Reiné
- Written by: J.D. Zeik
- Produced by: Steven Seagal; Binh Dang; Joe Halpin; Alwyn Kushner
- Starring: Steven Seagal; Lance Henriksen; Renée Elise Goldsberry; Blanchard Ryan; Arthur J. Nascarella; Lydia Jordan
- Cinematography: Richard Crudo
- Edited by: Todd C. Ramsay
- Music by: Gerald Brunskill
- Production companies: Stage 6 Films; Brightlight Pictures; Steamroller Productions
- Distributed by: Sony Pictures Home Entertainment
- Release date: March 4, 2008
- Running time: 99 minutes
- Country: United States
- Language: English
- Box office: $89,320 (Japan)

Pistol Whipped is a 2008 American action film directed by Roel Reiné. The film stars Steven Seagal, and was released on direct-to-DVD in the United States on March 4, 2008.

== Plot ==
Matt Connor is an unemployed, drinking deadbeat. Once he was a police officer who lived with his wife Liz and his daughter Becky. Then, his partner disappeared, along with a large stash of police-impounded money. Due to the fact that Matt was an avid gambler, he was the prime suspect for the crime, but his colleague Steve lied that he and Matt were playing poker, thus giving him an alibi. Since the police still suspected Matt of the crimes, he was thrown off the police force. Matt's wife files for divorce and marries Steve. Matt's daughter Becky stays with Steve while Matt spends his time gambling and heavily drinking.

Some time later, Matt's markers from extended gambling are mysteriously picked up. Eventually the collector, called the "Old Man", sends him a messenger named Blue. Matt is told that he must work off his debt as a hitman for the Old Man's vigilante organization. He begins to receive contracts to kill criminals who avoid arrest with their money and influence.

Matt deals with his first assignments without much difficulty. Matt also surprisingly learns that his new girlfriend Drea is also an operative for the Old Man, like Blue. Later, Matt is ordered to kill Steve. He refuses and confronts Blue, the Old Man, and Drea with the assignment. Matt is told that Steve is actually a dirty cop who deals with criminals; Matt refuses to believe this. Elsewhere, Steve kills an innocent chaplain because in a prior confession to the priest Matt had talked about his history with Steve. Steve uses this to frame Blue for the crime. When Matt returns to the church, he swears that he will avenge the clergyman's death, despite Steve's urgent requests to stay out of the situation. Unwilling to heed Steve's request, Matt is then arrested by Steve for being a "material witness" and released after two hours because Steve hopes to find the Old Man and kill Matt and Blue through following Matt. Still, Matt and Blue manage to escape. At the priest's funeral, which Matt later attends, Steve and his associates plan to kill Matt.

After the funeral ends, a standoff ensues between Matt and Steve. It is revealed that Steve stole the confiscated money and murdered Matt's partner out of fear that he would blow the whistle on Steve's operations. Blue and Drea show up to support Matt, much to the surprise of Steve, and a gunfight ensues. As a trump card, Steve reveals that he is holding Becky hostage, and threatens to kill her if Matt does not back down. Drea is able to free Becky while Matt and Blue fight Steve's associates. Blue is mortally wounded and says his goodbyes to Matt before passing. Matt and Steve confront each other once more and Matt successfully kills Steve.

Much later, Becky and her father are shown to be reunited and spending more time together than before. The camera cuts to Matt praying in the church as Drea walks in to give Matt his next assignment from the Old Man.

== Cast ==
- Steven Seagal as Matt Connor
- Lydia Jordan as Becky Connor
- Lance Henriksen as "The Old Man"
- Renée Elise Goldsberry as Drea Smalls
- Blanchard Ryan as Liz Connor-Shacter
- Arthur J. Nascarella as Bruno
- Paul Calderón as "Blue"
- Mark Elliot Wilson as Lieutenant Steve Shacter
- Wass Stevens as Tim Wheeler
- Antoni Corone as Sharp

== Critical reception ==
The film was better received than many of Seagal's DTV efforts, which have generally been met with disappointment from fans. David Nusair of Reelfilm.com claimed the film, "...undeniably does continue the upward trend of Steven Seagal's career trajectory as of late..." and that it sports, "...a number of surprisingly decent hand-to-hand fighting sequences... echoing some of the best efforts of his early days," though he criticizes the slow pace of the screenplay.

Seagalogy author Vern praised the film, calling it "a classic of the DTV era," commending the film's better-than-usual cast (particularly Lance Henriksen and Paul Calderón), nuanced storyline, and Seagal's willingness to play an older, more flawed character than he typically does. He compares it to Jean-Claude Van Damme's 2007 film Until Death and Abel Ferrara's 1992 film Bad Lieutenant in its subversion of action icons through the use of an unusually flawed protagonist, and claims that, "[Pistol Whipped] has Seagal stretching his persona and exploring new territory without abandoning his classic themes".

David Johnson of DVD Verdict gave the film a negative review, saying "this entry into the Seagal canon is dull," and going on to criticize Seagal's physique and calling the plot, "slow-moving, emotionally contrived and utterly predictable."

== Production ==
It is set and filmed on location in Bridgeport, Connecticut in 37 days on May 20 and June 26, 2007.

== DVD release and sales ==
DVD was released in Region 1 in the United States on March 4, 2008, and also Region 2 in the United Kingdom on 7 April 2008, it was distributed by Sony Pictures Home Entertainment. DVD was garnered $2,846,676 in revenue.
