= On Deadly Ground =

- Theatrical release poster
- Directed by: Steven Seagal
- Written by: Ed Horowitz; Robin U. Russin
- Produced by: Steven Seagal; A. Kitman Ho; Julius R. Nasso
- Starring: Steven Seagal; Michael Caine; Joan Chen; John C. McGinley
- Cinematography: Ric Waite
- Edited by: Don Brochu; Robert A. Ferretti
- Music by: Basil Poledouris
- Production company: Seagal/Nasso Productions
- Distributed by: Warner Bros.
- Release date: February 18, 1994 (United States)
- Running time: 101 minutes
- Country: United States
- Languages: English; Yupik
- Budget: $50 million
- Box office: $78.1 million

On Deadly Ground is a 1994 American environmental action adventure film directed, co-produced by, and starring Steven Seagal, and co-starring Michael Caine, Joan Chen, John C. McGinley and R. Lee Ermey. It is, as of 2026, Seagal's only directorial effort and features a minor appearance by Billy Bob Thornton in one of his early roles. Seagal plays Forrest Taft, an expert firefighter who chooses to fight back against the environmental destruction caused by his ruthless former employer (Caine). On Deadly Ground was theatrically released in the United States on February 18, 1994, by Warner Bros. It garnered negative reviews from critics and grossed $78.1 million worldwide on a $50 million production budget.

== Plot ==
Aegis Oil owns various oil refineries and rigs in Alaska, where the company faces strong public opposition due to the increasing environmental damage from its operations. Aegis had purchased the oil production rights from the local tribal council 20 years prior; however, the rights will revert to the Native Americans if Aegis 1, the company's newest oil platform and biggest refinery, is not online within a certain deadline. To meet the deadline despite multiple delays, CEO Michael Jennings forces his workers to use substandard parts.

Foreman Hugh Palmer's rig suffers a blowout due to a faulty preventer. Trained firefighter Forrest Taft extinguishes the blaze. However, they have become suspicious of their company's consistently poor safety record. Taft manages to hack into the company's computer files and learn about the faulty parts. After being informed of Palmer's efforts to alert the EPA and of Taft's access to restricted files, Jennings arranges for both to be eliminated by his CSO, MacGruder, and his assistant, Otto. The two ransack Palmer's cabin and brutally torture and murder him when he refuses to cooperate. Meanwhile, Taft is ordered by Jennings to head over to another accident site, but realizes too late that the damaged building has been rigged as a booby trap. Taft narrowly survives the ensuing explosion and is rescued by Masu, the daughter of Yupik tribe chief Silook.

At the behest of Silook, Taft undergoes a vision quest in which he sees the full truth and vows to make amends for his part in Aegis's crimes. Meanwhile, the Aegis security team tracks Taft to Silook's village, and when the tribe turns them down, a confrontation ensues, ending with MacGruder fatally shooting Silook. Taft returns in time to have one last talk with Silook before he succumbs to his wounds, vowing to avenge him and bring down Aegis.

Taft and Masu make their way to Palmer's cabin. While gathering supplies, they find his incriminating disk containing proof of Aegis's crimes. Otto and three Aegis security guards track the pair back to the cabin. Taft ambushes the party, quickly killing all of them. Jennings then deploys a squad of mercenaries led by an older man code-named "Stone", but Taft manages to evade the group by killing several of the members with booby traps and blowing up a shack, which obliterates a helicopter, effectively finishing their pursuit.

Taft and Masu collect weapons and explosives, then sneak into the refinery complex. Taft sabotages Aegis 1 by killing the main power and forcing a reboot, then releasing hydrochloric acid gas inside the refinery. He then plants a series of C-4 explosive charges onto several oil tanks and in the control room and sets them to a timer.

Jennings has already arrived at the refinery to check on it when he gets word of Taft's infiltration and orders his henchmen to find and kill him. Taft fights and eventually eliminates every opposing mercenary (including MacGruder and Stone) using firearms, a steel pipe, and even burning gasoline. He then confronts Jennings, cornering him and condemning him for his greed and corruption. As Jennings attempts to escape, Taft lassos one of his legs with a cable, puts it on a hook, and shoots the cable, sending Jennings to his death into a pool of oil sludge below. He and Masu then escape the rig just as the hidden C-4 charges detonate, causing a chain of explosions that ravage the entire plant. They flee the exploding refinery in an Aegis truck, escaping as Aegis 1 is torn down by the fire. Later, Taft, far from being arrested for industrial sabotage and multiple murders, delivers a speech at the Alaska State Capitol about the dangers of oil pollution and the companies that are endangering the ecosystem.

== Cast ==
- Steven Seagal as Forrest Taft, a firefighter and blowout specialist.
- Michael Caine as Michael Jennings, greedy, ruthless billionaire CEO of Aegis Oil.
- Joan Chen as Masu, the daughter of Yupik tribe chief Silook.
- John C. McGinley as MacGruder, the chief of security of Aegis Oil.
- R. Lee Ermey as Stone, the leader of the mercenary group.
- Shari Shattuck as Liles, Jennings' personal assistant.
- Billy Bob Thornton as Homer Carlton, one of Stone's men.
- Richard Hamilton as Hugh Palmer, rig foreman of Aegis Oil.
- Chief Irvin Brink as Silook, chief of the Alaskan Yupik tribe.
- John Trudell as Johnny Redfeather, Forrest's friend.
- Mike Starr as Mike "Big Mike", an oil worker who starts a barfight with Forrest.
- Sven-Ole Thorsen as Otto, Jennings' other henchman.
- Bart the Bear as The Bear

== Production ==
Initially, Steven Seagal had intended to make his directorial debut with Man of Honor, described as a drama in the vein of The Godfather wherein Seagal would play the son of a Mafia kingpin who becomes bodyguard for an informant with whom he falls in love, for 20th Century Fox which was met with resistance from then studio head Joe Roth over the proposed $30 million budget until Morgan Creek Entertainment came in to provide one third of the production budget in exchange for international distribution rights. Additional funding was also provided by a Saudi Prince who, like Morgan Creek, also pulled out. In November 1992, Morgan Creek pulled out of the project causing Fox to cancel Man of Honor with Seagal forced to pay $1 million to personnel attached to the film out of his pocket which became a point of contention between him and Fox. Seagal left Fox, who were considering whether to acquire Jeb Stuart's Going West in America as a vehicle for Seagal, and instead shifted focus to Warner Bros. Pictures environmentally themed action film then titled Rainbow Warrior with his intention to make his directorial debut with that film. While at Fox, Seagal had written scripts tackling themes like environmentalism and the AIDS epidemic but was routinely shot down by executives.

In March 1993, it was reported that Steven Seagal had entered into a deal with Columbia to star in Fire Down Below one week after Warner Bros. delayed filming on Rainbow Warrior after executives became concerned about the film's budget. Warner Bros. stated Rainbow Warrior, which was planned to be filmed in Alaska, cited insufficient snowfall as reason for the delay, but the National Weather Service reported that Valdez, Alaska recorded 47 inches of snow on the ground and Nome, Alaska had 10 inches with snow showers forecast throughout the week. This led to rumors in the industry that Warner Bros. was finding excuses to postpone Rainbow Warrior after the film's original $35 million budget had ballooned into above $45 million with anonymous sources attributing the cost increases to Seagal's inability to control the production. Additional rumors claimed that Seagal was so annoyed with Warner Bros. that he took the similarly environmentally themed film Fire Down Below as tit for tat for Warner Bros. delay which Warner Bros. denied as Seagal's four picture deal with Warner Bros. gave Seagal the option to do one film with another studio outside the deal referred to as an "out" movie. Later that month, Rob Friedman, then Warner Bros. President of Worldwide Advertising and Publicity, stated that Seagal would not be making Fire Down Below until 1995 or 1996 as he had to make three more movies for Warner Bros. before making an out movie. Then Columbia production chief, Michael Nathanson, indicated the film was "Go Picture" and voiced the intent of making the movie sometime in the next year with Seagal possibly being offered the position of director. Following a two month delay, the film under its new title of On Deadly Ground began filming in May of that year.

In addition to the credited writers, Chris Gerolmo, David Goyer, and Mitchell Kapner also did work on the screenplay.

=== Title change ===
In March 1993, it was reported that the film would likely abandon the title of Rainbow Warrior due to a conflict with Greenpeace over the name which had been used for their ship. Around the same time, Carolco Pictures was in development with director Renny Harlin and writer David Williamson on Warriors of the Rainbow, a film which would've detailed Robert Hunter and Greenpeace's activities during the 1970s. One of the possible names floated for replacement was Spirit Warrior. By May of that year, it was reported the film had settled on the title of On Deadly Ground.

== Release ==
The film was theatrically released on February 18, 1994. A home video release followed on July 20, 1994.

== Reception ==
=== Critical response ===
On Deadly Ground received negative reviews from critics. On the review aggregator website Rotten Tomatoes, 14% of 35 critics' reviews are positive, with an average rating of 3.5/10. Metacritic, which uses a weighted average, assigned the film a score of 33 out of 100, based on 18 critics, indicating "generally unfavorable" reviews. Audiences polled by CinemaScore gave the film a grade of "B+" on an A+ to F scale.

At the time of its release, Gene Siskel included the film in his "Worst of" list for 1994, singling out the melancholy tone of the film and the quality of Seagal's dialogue. On their syndicated TV show Siskel & Ebert, Siskel called the film's pyrotechnics "dirty and low-rent" and stated that he "didn't think the fight sequences were anything special." He noted that Seagal's speech at the end was "more interesting than the actual fighting."

Roger Ebert, for his part, stated the movie was "limited to two basic qualities: it's violent and it's sanctimonious", and opined that while "it doesn't pay to devote close attention to the plot", "if you like to see lots of stuff blowed up real good, then this'll be a movie for you." His opinion on the ending speech was that it was "absurd", stating, "at the end after Seagal kills about 30 people and blowing up the largest oil refinery in the world, what happens? He's invited to the Alaska State Legislature to give a talk about ecology. I'm not sure, but blowing up oil refineries does not make you that popular in Alaska."

Variety film critic Leonard Klady referred to the film as "a vanity production parading as a social statement" and commented that the film seemingly borrowed heavily from the earlier film Billy Jack, but opined that Seagal lacked "acting technique and the ability behind the camera to keep the story simple and direct" that Billy Jack star Tom Laughlin exhibited. Like Siskel, Klady also singled out the speech by Seagal's character at the end of the film.

In the 1996 movie guide "Seen That, Now What?", the film was given the rating of "C−", stating "This combination action/environmental rights movie is an interesting hybrid in concept, but a filmic mess in execution, including embarrassing Eskimo shaman scenes and well-meaning lecture-finale on endangered species."

Seagalogy author Vern considers On Deadly Ground to be one of Seagal's defining works, writing, "It's the corniest, most unintentionally hilarious movie of his career... But it's also Seagal's most sincere and his most ballsy," going on to claim, "You can't understand Seagal if you haven't seen On Deadly Ground." He points out that many of the most important themes and motifs that define Seagal's work are present in the film, and more overtly so than in any of his other films.

Caine's American accent in the film, which The Daily Telegraph described as that of a "Texan that had been brought up in the mean streets of London," has made several "worst movie accent" lists.

=== Box office ===
The film grossed $38.6 million in the United States and Canada and $78.1 million worldwide against its reported $50 million budget.

=== Accolades ===
The film received six Golden Raspberry Awards nominations and won in the Worst Director category. The film is listed in Golden Raspberry Award founder John Wilson's book The Official Razzie Movie Guide as one of The 100 Most Enjoyably Bad Movies Ever Made.

Award	Category	Subject	Result
Golden Raspberry Award	Worst Actress	Joan Chen	Nominated
Golden Raspberry Award	Worst Actor	Steven Seagal	Nominated
Golden Raspberry Award	Worst Director	Steven Seagal	Won
Golden Raspberry Award	Worst Picture	Steven Seagal	Nominated
Golden Raspberry Award	Worst Picture	A. Kitman Ho	Nominated
Golden Raspberry Award	Worst Picture	Julius R. Nasso	Nominated
Golden Raspberry Award	Worst Screenplay	Ed Horowitz	Nominated
Golden Raspberry Award	Worst Screenplay	Robin U. Russin	Nominated
Golden Raspberry Award	Worst Original Song ("Under the Same Sun")	Mark Hudson	Nominated
Golden Raspberry Award	Worst Original Song ("Under the Same Sun")	Klaus Meine	Nominated
Golden Raspberry Award	Worst Original Song ("Under the Same Sun")	Bruce Fairbairn	Nominated

==== Year-end lists ====
- 1st worst – Sean P. Means, The Salt Lake Tribune
- 2nd worst – Bob Strauss, Los Angeles Daily News
- 7th worst – Dan Craft, The Pantagraph
- 9th worst – Peter Travers, Rolling Stone
- Top 10 worst (listed alphabetically, not ranked) – Mike Mayo, The Roanoke Times
- Top 10 worst (not ranked) – Betsy Pickle, Knoxville News-Sentinel
- Top 10 worst (not ranked) – Dan Webster, The Spokesman-Review
