= Songs from the Crystal Cave =

Studio album by Steven Seagal
- Released: 2004
- Studio: Metalworks (Mississauga, Ontario)
- Genre: Rock; blues; dancehall; reggae
- Length: 61:24
- Label: Nonsolo Blues; WSM
- Producer: Al Anderson; Tyrone Downie; Shaun Fisher; Steven Seagal; Ric Wake; Chris Wonzer

Steven Seagal chronology
Songs from the Crystal Cave (2004)	Mojo Priest (2006)

Songs from the Crystal Cave is the debut album by actor Steven Seagal, released in 2004 on Nonsolo Blues and Warner Strategic Marketing. The album features a mix of musical genres, including rock, reggae, and country. Musicians collaborating on this album include Stevie Wonder and Lady Saw.

== Critical reception ==
Professional ratings
Review scores
Source	Rating
AllMusic	2.5/5 stars

Thom Jurek of AllMusic gave the album 2.5 stars out of 5, highlighting the album's mixture of styles and emotional tones from song to song for criticism as being slipshod and haphazard. However, Jurek credited the album for being "endearing in its own way" and presenting the listener with a "good-vibes experience".

== Track listing ==
1. "Girl It's Alright" – 3:52 (Steven Seagal, Greg Barnhill)
2. "Don't You Cry" – 4:59 (Seagal, Barnhill)
3. "Music" – 4:15 (Seagal, Patrick George Barrett)
4. "Better Man" – 4:29 (Seagal, Barnhill)
5. "Route 23" – 4:32 (Seagal)
6. "My God" – 3:59 (Seagal)
7. "Lollipop" – 4:36 (Seagal, Shaun Fisher)
8. "Not for Sale" – 4:58 (Seagal, Fisher)
9. "Dance" – 3:34 (Seagal, Fisher)
10. "Jealousy" – 4:22 (Seagal, Marion Hall)
11. "War" – 3:47 (Seagal, Cleve Laing)
12. "Strut" – 3:06 (Seagal, Hall)
13. "Goree" – 6:00 (Seagal)
14. "The Light" – 4:55 (Seagal)

== Personnel ==
- Steven Seagal – vocals, rhythm and lead guitar, drums, percussion, clay pot
- Greg Barnhill – acoustic guitars
- Al Anderson – rhythm guitar
- Tommy K. – acoustic, rhythm and wah-wah guitars
- Russ DeSalvo – acoustic and electric guitars, synthesizers
- Stevie Wonder – harmonica
- Marty Grebb – keyboards, organ
- Veit Renn – keyboards
- Patrick Carroll – bass guitar, drum and percussion programming
- Habib Faye – bass guitar, keyboards, drum and percussion programming
- Shaun Fisher – keyboards, bass guitar, drums, percussion
- Rhonda Smith – bass guitar
- Frank Valardi – drums
- Babakar – African drums
- T.H. Subash Chandran – ethnic percussion, bowls, tabla, Jew's harp
- Remi Kabaka – talking drum
- Mani Subramaniam – violin
- Lady Saw, "Lieutenant Stitchie" – DJ
- Tony Rebel – rap
- Rose Banks, Sharon Bryant, Dana Calitri, Ripley Fairchild, Lisa Frazier, Curtis King, Michael Okri, Janice Brocking-Renn – vocal backing

== Charts ==
Chart performance for Songs from the Crystal Cave
Chart (2004)	Peak position
French Albums (SNEP)	42
