= Attack Force (film) =

- DVD cover
- Directed by: Michael Keusch
- Written by: Joe Halpin; Steven Seagal
- Produced by: Joe Halpin; Vlad Paunescu; Steven Seagal; Pierre Spengler
- Starring: Steven Seagal; Lisa Lovbrand; David Kennedy
- Cinematography: Sonja Rom
- Edited by: Jonathan Brayley
- Music by: Barry Taylor
- Production companies: Clubdeal; Steamroller Productions
- Distributed by: Sony Pictures Home Entertainment
- Release date: December 5, 2006
- Running time: 95 minutes
- Countries: United States; Romania; United Kingdom
- Language: English
- Budget: $12 million

Attack Force is a 2006 American science fiction action thriller film directed by Michael Keusch, and also written and produced by Steven Seagal, who also stars in the film. The film co-stars Lisa Lovbrand and David Kennedy. The film was released on direct-to-DVD in the United States on December 5, 2006.

== Plot ==
Marshall Lawson (Steven Seagal) is the commander of an elite U.S. military unit. During an overseas assignment in Paris, Lawson loses all three of his men in a seemingly random attack on their hotel room. He takes it upon himself to investigate the attack, with the help of his girlfriend Tia (Lisa Lovbrand) and his friend Dwayne (David Kennedy). Marshall uncovers CTX, a covert military drug so secret that an arm of the military headed by a man named Werner (Danny Webb) wants Marshall eliminated. Tia turns out to be one of the two military scientists who developed CTX.

Reina (Evelyne Armela O'Bami), the prostitute who slaughtered Marshall's team, was under the influence of CTX. The drug gives its users superhuman strength and agility, but also irrevocably drives them to violence. The other co-inventor of CTX is Aroon (Adam Croasdell), now a Paris night club owner. Aroon has plans to release the CTX into the Paris' water supply, which would turn the city's residents into deranged killers. Marshall, Tia, and Dwayne must stop Aroon and Werner before that happens.

== Cast ==
- Steven Seagal as Commander Marshall Lawson
- Lisa Lovbrand as Tia
- David Kennedy as Dwayne
- Danny Webb as Werner
- Evelyne Armela O'Bami as Reina
- Ileana Lazariuc as Queen
- Gabi Burlacu as Tia's agent
- Matthew Chambers as Seth
- Vlad Coada as Tia's Agent #3
- Adam Croasdell as Aroon
- Mark Dymond as Phil
- Florian Ghimpu as Tourist
- Vlad Iacob as Tia's Agent
- Ileana Lazariuc as Queen
- Sayed Najem as Hitman Guard
- Daniel Pisica as Lead Team Soldier

== Production ==
Filming took place at Castel Film Studios in Bucharest, Romania from January 7 to March 8, 2006.

When the film was first announced under the name Harvester, the plot description described a significantly different scenario than the one in the finished film; the villains were described as aliens with actress Ileana Lazariuc listed as "alien queen." In an email exchange between Seagalogy author Vern and co-writer Joe Halpin prior to the release of Attack Force, Halpin confirmed that although the movie had been written with a sci-fi element, it had been shot in two ways: one explained the villain's actions as the work of European mobsters, and the other explained them as the work of aliens. Asked if the alien plot elements would be present in the final cut, Halpin answered "Who knows," explaining that the producers and Seagal would come to an agreement in post-production. In the finished film, the villains are explained to be gangsters, and no reference is made to any extraterrestrial origin.

Critics and fans have speculated that leaving the nature of the story unresolved during principal photography led to the pervasive use of other actors overdubbing dialogue (particularly Seagal's) that occurs in the finished film. Seagal's 2005 film Submerged appears to have undergone a similar post-production process.

Apparently Seagal and the director did not get along during production

== Reception ==
David Nusair of Reel Film Reviews called it, "flat-out unwatchable," and "egregiously shoddy," claiming, "even the most ardent Seagal fan would be hard-pressed to sit through this monstrosity of a production in just one sitting." Seagalogy author Vern noted "[Seagal] does a bare minimum, the lowest amount he can get away with and still seem like the star. Not much fighting, not always appearing (or speaking) in his own scenes, no speeches," but goes on to note, "...I don’t agree that it’s his worst," comparing it favorably to Seagal's previous film (also directed by Michael Keusch), 2006's Shadow Man.

Several reviewers complained about the perceived slapdash nature of the film, in particular the extensive use of an obvious voice double overdubbing much of the dialogue from Seagal.
