= The Way of the Shadow Wolves =

2017 novel by Steven Seagal and Tom Morrissey

The Way of the Shadow Wolves: The Deep State and the Hijacking of America
- Author: Steven Seagal; Tom Morrissey
- Genre: Conspiracy thriller
- Publisher: Self-published
- Publication date: October 2017
- ISBN: 978-0999497517

The Way of the Shadow Wolves: The Deep State and the Hijacking of America is a conspiracy thriller novel, co-written by actor Steven Seagal and Tom Morrissey, the former chair of the Arizona Republican Party and the mayor of Payson, Arizona.

The book was self-published in October 2017, with a foreword by Joe Arpaio.

== Synopsis ==
John Nan Tan Gode, a member of the Shadow Wolves, discovers a plot by Mexican drug cartels and the Deep State to smuggle Jihadi terrorists across the American border in Maricopa County, Arizona.

== Reception ==
The book's reception has been overwhelmingly negative. At Politico, Nathan Rabin called it a "Fox News fever dream" and "the socio-political equivalent of Reefer Madness in terms of unintentional laughs", saying that he was confident no ghost writer had contributed because the book was "so adorably incompetent and inept that it's hard to imagine that a professional writer had anything to do with it". Rabin subsequently published a long-form analysis of what he saw as the novel's flaws, including its dialogue, its exposition, its overindulgence in conspiracy theories, its portrayal of women, its use of characters who have "nearly identical names, personalities and background", and "the most ridiculous caricature of Native Americans as vessels of pure spirit living in perfect harmony with the Lord I've ever seen or read", concluding that "it would be almost impossible to exaggerate [the book's] racism, stupidity or amateurish writing" and that it is thus "utterly beyond satire or parody."

Vulture called it "completely batshit insane", with Gode (who is alternately described as being Mohawk and Apache) being "clearly a Seagal avatar", and noted that the "antagonists' motivations never make much sense" and that it is "difficult to say for sure what really happens in this book or how it ends."

The Phoenix New Times called it "garbage", with interactions between Gode and his girlfriend that were "breathtakingly bad", "dialogue-heavy scenes" where it was "hard to follow who's speaking", and fight scenes that were "even more boring than the dialogue".

Rob Beschizza of BoingBoing described the novel's cover art as "look[ing] like a Photoshopped parody of itself."
