= The Last Canadian =

1974 novel by William C. Heine

- 1976 edition (UK)
- Author: William C. Heine
- Language: English
- Genre: Science fiction, post-apocalyptic fiction
- Publisher: Pocket Book of Canada; Robert Hale (UK)
- Publication date: 1974
- Publication place: Canada
- Media type: Print (paperback)
- Pages: 253
- ISBN: 978-0-7701-0087-2

The Last Canadian is a 1974 science fiction novel by William C. Heine about the adventures of Eugene Arnprior after North America is devastated by a plague. The U.S. release of the novel was titled Death Wind.

== Plot introduction ==
A 1970s Cold War apocalyptic story where Eugene Arnprior, an engineer living in Montreal, who after learning of a fast spreading airborne virus, moves his wife and two sons to an isolated cabin in Northern Quebec.

== Movie ==
Though the 1998 movie The Patriot is credited as an adaptation of William C. Heine's novel The Last Canadian, it shares virtually no similarities with the novel except the idea of a deadly virus. No character names, events, or even locations appear in both the book and the film.

== Explanation of title ==
Eugene Arnprior had just received in the mail a notice of his Canadian citizenship when the plague struck. Therefore, he considered himself The Last Canadian.
