= Shadow Wolves =

Unit of Native American trackers for ICE

The "Shadow Wolves" are a Native American tactical patrol unit assigned to Homeland Security Investigations (HSI) in Sells, Arizona, located on the Tohono Oʼodham Nation that runs along the Mexico–United States border.

The Shadow Wolves specialize in the interdiction of human and drug smugglers in the Sonoran Desert, utilizing both technology and the traditional tracking methods. In addition to the use of high-tech equipment, the unit relies on tracking techniques such as "cutting for sign", which includes investigating any kind of physical evidence left by smugglers (e.g., footprints, tire tracks, thread, clothing). The Shadow Wolves are the Department of Homeland Security's only Native American tracking unit specifically utilized for targeted interdiction operations.

The unit was established by Congressional mandate in 1974 in response to rampant smuggling occurring through the Tohono O’odham Nation.

== History ==
The "Shadow Wolves" law enforcement unit was created in 1974 by an Act of Congress, after the U.S. federal government agreed to the Tohono O'odham Nation's demand that the officers have at least one fourth Native American ancestry. The Shadow Wolves became the first federal law enforcement agents allowed to operate on Tohono land.

Members of the Shadow Wolves.

The unit is congressionally authorized to have as many as 21 members but, as of March, 2007, it consisted of only 15 members. Members of the unit come from nine different tribes, including the Tohono O'odham, Blackfeet, Lakota, Navajo, Omaha, Sioux, and Yaqui.

Originally part of the U.S Customs Service, the Shadow Wolves became part of the Department of Homeland Security in 2003, when the U.S. Customs Service was folded into DHS.

On December 22, 2021, during the 117th Congress, Rep. John Katko (R-NY-24) introduced H.R. 5681, which proposed to broaden the Shadow Wolves' authorities while preserving the important legacy of the unit. The bill became Public Law 117-113 on April 19, 2022. The law provides flexibility to reclassify the Shadow Wolves, current and future, from GS-1801 Tactical Officers to GS-1811 Special Agents.

Uniform patch for the Shadow Wolves.

The Tohono Oʼodham Nation, patrolled by the Shadow Wolves, covers 2,800,000 acres (11,000 km^{2}), including a 76-mile (122-kilometer) stretch of land shared with Mexico. It is mainly made up of small, scattered villages. Between 2010 and 2020, interdiction and investigative efforts the Shadow Wolves have led or participated in have resulted in 437 drug and immigration arrests along with the seizure of over 117,264 pounds of drugs, 45 weapons, 251 vehicles and $847,928 in U.S. currency.

== Global training missions ==
In addition to tracking smugglers on the U.S. border, the Shadow Wolves have also been asked to train border guards and customs agents in other jurisdictions, including Latvia, Lithuania, Moldova, Estonia, Kazakhstan, and Uzbekistan. The unit was also used in the effort to hunt terrorists along the border of Afghanistan and Pakistan by training regional border guards in Native American ancestral tracking methods.

== In popular culture ==
- A documentary film about the Shadow Wolves, Shadow Wolves: Tracking of a Documentary, was directed by Jack Kohler and produced by Joseph Arthur. The documentary profiles an intertribal group of Native Americans.
- The Shadow Wolves were featured in the National Geographic Channel show Border Wars in the episode titled "Walk the Line".
- Shadow Wolves is a 2019 movie that is loosely based on real-life Shadow Wolves.
- In the 2020 film Sonic the Hedgehog, Dr. Robotnik remarks that he learned tracking skills from Shadow Wolves.
- The protagonist of the 2017 Steven Seagal novel, The Way of the Shadow Wolves, is a member of the Shadow Wolves.
- A film about the Shadow Wolves from KosFilms and to be directed by Brian Kosiksy, called Call of the Shadow Wolves, was reportedly preparing for production in southern Arizona in October 2009.
