= The Asian Connection =

2016 action film

- Directed by: Daniel Zirilli
- Screenplay by: D. Glase Lomond
- Story by: Tom Sizemore; Daniel Zirilli
- Produced by: Danny Roth; Damiano Tucci
- Starring: Michael Jai White; Pim Bubear; John Edward Lee; Steven Seagal
- Release date: May 13, 2016
- Running time: 88 minutes
- Language: English

The Asian Connection is a 2016 action film starring Steven Seagal.

== Premise ==
Two expatriates living in Thailand go to Cambodia and steal a drug lord's money.

== Production ==
The film was based on a story by the actor Tom Sizemore called The Mexican Connection. It was rewritten to be set in Asia.

== Reception ==
The Los Angeles Times called the film "a dumb, boring dud", even by B-movie standards and accounting for the name Steven Seagal above the title. Jason Best of Movie Talk gave it 1 out of 5, calling it "An amateurish effort all round."

== Home media ==
In home video sales the film earned an estimated $45,567.
