= Lydia Jordan =

American actress (born 1994)

- Born: Lydia Grace Jordan; June 12, 1994 (age 31); New York City, New York, U.S.A.
- Occupation: Actress
- Years active: 2002–present

Lydia Jordan is an American actress best known for her role as Alice in the 2008 film Doubt.

== Filmography ==
Film
Year	Film	Role	Notes	Ref.
2002	The Secret Lives of Dentists	Stephanie Hurst		
2003	Gods and Generals	Jane Corbin		
2005	The Thing About My Folks	Mia Kleinman		
2005	Into the Fire	Quinn Sickles		
2008	Pistol Whipped	Becky		
2008	Doubt	Alice		

Television
Year	Title	Role	Notes
2002	Third Watch	Girl #1	Episode: "Old Dogs, New Tricks"
2002	Law & Order: Criminal Intent	Sophie Feldman	Episode: "Crazy"
2003	Ed	Joanne Ofano	Episode: "Captain Lucidity"
2003	Hope & Faith	Fairy	
2004	Monk	Little Girl Skater	
2004	Law & Order: Criminal Intent	Charlotte	Episode: "The Saint"
2006–2007	Kidnapped	Alice Cain	10 episodes
2008	Gossip Girl	12 Year Old Nosey Girl #2	Episode: "The Dark Night"
2009	Gossip Girl	Mini Mean Girl	Episode: "Gone with the Will"
2010	Ugly Betty	Lily	Episode: "All the World's a Stage"
