= Mojo Priest =

Studio album by Steven Seagal
- Released: April 2006
- Genre: Blues
- Length: 61:31
- Producer: Steven Seagal

Steven Seagal chronology
Songs from the Crystal Cave (2004)	Mojo Priest (2006)

Professional ratings
Review scores
Source	Rating
AllMusic	1.5/5 stars

Mojo Priest is the second album by actor Steven Seagal, released in April 2006 by Seagal's own Steamroller Productions company. While his debut album Songs from the Crystal Cave featured a mixture of musical styles, Mojo Priest is a blues album, and unlike his debut, the album spawned a concert tour.

== Critical reception ==
Thom Jurek of AllMusic panned the album, rating it 1.5 stars out of 5 and stating that Seagal's guitar playing "rarely rises above bar band pedigree" and that "all of this music takes itself so seriously that it borders on delusional excess."

== Track listing ==
1. "Somewhere in Between" – 4:17
2. "Love Doctor" – 3:40
3. "Dark Angel" – 3:57
4. "Gunfire in a Juke Joint" – 3:45
5. "My Time Is Numbered" – 4:19
6. "Alligator Ass" – 4:03
7. "BBQ" (with Teena Marie) – 3:26
8. "Hoochie Koochie Man" – 4:25
9. "Talk to My Ass" – 3:51
10. "Dust My Broom" (with Louisiana Red) – 4:38
11. "Slow Boat to China" – 8:43
12. "She Dat Pretty" – 3:44
13. "Red Rooster" – 3:29
14. "Shake" (with Bo Diddley) – 3:32
15. "Untitled" (bonus track) – 0:36
16. "Untitled" (bonus track) – 0:45
17. "Untitled" (bonus track) – 0:12

== Charts ==
Chart performance for Mojo Priest
Chart (2006–2007)	Peak position
Belgian Albums (Ultratop Wallonia)	83
Danish Albums (Hitlisten)	18
French Albums (SNEP)	47
UK Independent Albums (OCC)	45
UK Jazz & Blues Albums (OCC)	23
