= Above the Law (1988 film) =

1988 film by Andrew Davis

- Theatrical release poster
- Directed by: Andrew Davis
- Screenplay by: Steven Pressfield; Andrew Davis; Ronald Shusett
- Story by: Steven Seagal; Andrew Davis
- Produced by: Steven Seagal; Andrew Davis
- Starring: Steven Seagal; Pam Grier; Henry Silva; Sharon Stone
- Cinematography: Robert Steadman
- Edited by: Michael Brown
- Music by: David Michael Frank
- Distributed by: Warner Bros.
- Release date: April 8, 1988
- Running time: 99 minutes
- Country: United States
- Language: English
- Budget: $7.5 million
- Box office: $18.8 million

Above the Law (also known as Nico: Above the Law, or simply Nico) is a 1988 American action thriller film co-written, produced and directed by Andrew Davis. It marked the film debut of Steven Seagal, who also produced the film and co-authored the story alongside Davis, and stars Seagal alongside Pam Grier, Sharon Stone, and Henry Silva. Seagal plays Nico Toscani, an ex-CIA agent, an aikido specialist, and a Chicago policeman who discovers a conspiracy upon investigating a mysterious shipment of military explosives seized from a narcotics dealer.

The film originated after a successful screen test financed by Michael Ovitz, leading to Seagal being offered a contract by Warner Bros. Pictures. It was set and filmed on location in Chicago, Davis’ hometown. The film premiered in the United States on April 8, 1988, becoming a commercial success despite mixed reviews, and launching Seagal's acting career. Above the Law is regarded as the first American film to feature aikido in fight sequences.

== Plot ==
Nicolo "Nico" Toscani is an expert martial artist, who is recruited by the CIA during the Vietnam War. While serving in covert operations on the Vietnamese-Cambodian border, he became disgusted with agent Kurt Zagon, who tortured prisoners. A stand-off occurs when Toscani tries to stop him, and he leaves the CIA.

Years later, Toscani is now married and a detective in the CPD’s vice squad. Toscani and his new partner, Delores "Jacks" Jackson, are investigating a drug ring, and after busting two of the dealers, including Salvadorian kingpin Tony Salvano, Toscani finds C-4 explosives. Shortly afterward, the men that Toscani and Jackson arrested are released at the request of federal officials, and Toscani is ordered to stand down. Later, the priest of Toscani's parish is killed in an explosion during Mass. Toscani's old CIA handler, Nelson Fox, contacts him and tells him to move his family to a safer location, saying that he is in danger. Under pressure from the feds, Toscani is asked to turn in his badge. He eventually discovers that the dealers he busted are linked to Kurt Zagon, who is still with the CIA, and who is being accused of human rights violations by a Central American priest who was being sheltered by Toscani's priest. While Zagon is torturing the priest, Toscani bursts in, and a gun battle ensues. Detectives Jackson and Lukich are wounded during the shootout, and Toscani has to flee.

U.S. Senator Ernest Harrison is investigating Zagon's group to reveal their ties to drug trafficking. When Toscani finds out that Zagon killed the priest and is planning to kill Harrison, he goes after him. Fox confronts Toscani while the latter is doing surveillance on a rooftop, but they are later interrupted by Zagon's men. Fox is killed, and Toscani is captured. He is held in a hotel kitchen during a Harrison campaign rally. Before Zagon can kill Harrison, Toscani breaks free and kills Zagon and all of his remaining men. Afterwards, Toscani meets Harrison, who has been informed of everything. Harrison promises justice, and Toscani says he is now willing to testify about his experiences with Zagon and covert operations in the CIA.

== Cast ==
Credits from the AFI Catalog of Feature Films:

- Steven Seagal as Det. Sgt. Nicolo "Nico" Toscani
- Pam Grier as Det. Delores "Jacks" Jackson
- Henry Silva as Kurt Zagon
- Sharon Stone as Sara Toscani
- Daniel Faraldo as Tony Salvano
- Ron Dean as Det. Lukich
- Jack Wallace as Uncle Branca
- Chelcie Ross as Nelson Fox
- Joe V. Greco as Father Joseph Gennaro
- Miguel Nino as Chi Chi
- Thalmus Rasulala as Deputy Superintendent Crowder
- Nicholas Kusenko as FBI Special Agent Neeley
- Gregory Alan Williams as FBI Agent Halloran
- Metta Davis as Rosa Toscani
- Joseph Kosala as Lt. Fred Strozah
- Ronnie Barron as Bartender
- Joe D. Lauck as Senator Ernest Harrison
- Henry Godinez as Father Tomasino
- Danny Goldring as Zagon's aide
- Gene Barge as Det. Henderson
- Mike James as Officer O’Hara
- Michelle Hoard as Lucy
- Rafael Gonzales as Abandano
- Cheryl Hamada as Watanabe
- Lee de Broux and Patrick Gorman as CIA interrogators
- Ralph Foody as Federal clerk
- Michael Rooker as Barfly

== Production ==
It has been reported that Steven Seagal was asked to make the film by his former aikido pupil, agent Michael Ovitz, who believed that he could make anyone a movie star. Seagal had previously worked as a film stunt performer and fight choreographer, as well as a celebrity bodyguard, but Above the Law was his acting debut. In addition to starring in the film, Seagal functioned as a producer, a co-screenwriter, and fight choreographer.

Seagal has claimed that portions of the film are autobiographical, and that he was employed by the CIA during the 1970s, initially as a martial arts instructor. His wife at the time, Miyako Fujitani, has denied these claims, and there is no evidence Seagal has ever worked with the Central Intelligence Agency.

=== Filming ===
Shooting took place in Chicago, Illinois, over 60 days from April 27 to June 26, 1987. The opening Vietnam War sequence was shot on a soundstage at Warner Bros. Studios, Burbank.

During the filming of the final fight scene, Henry Silva accidentally broke Seagal's nose.

John C. Reilly made his film debut, appearing as an uncredited extra during the bar brawl.

== Release ==
=== Home media ===
Warner Home Video released the Region 1 DVD in the United States on January 28, 1998. The Region 2 DVD was released in the United Kingdom on April 26, 1999. The Region-free Blu-ray Disc was released on April 7, 2009.

The 4K Ultra HD Blu-ray from Arrow Video sub-label Toy Robot Video is slated to be released on November 9, 2026 in the UK followed by a US release the next day.

== Reception ==
=== Box office ===
The film grossed $18,869,631 in the U.S., from a $7.5 million budget.

=== Critical response ===
Above the Law received mixed reviews. Rotten Tomatoes gives the film an approval rating of 50%, based on reviews from 20 critics, with an average rating of 5.2/10. Audiences polled by CinemaScore gave the film an average grade of "B" on an A+ to F scale.

Roger Ebert of the Chicago Sun-Times gave the film 3 stars of a possible 4, praising the use of Chicago locations and saying Seagal "doesn’t look or sound like a professional actor" but nonetheless had an intriguing onscreen presence. Ebert also highlighted Silva's performance as the "venomous and sleek" antagonist and said the complex story "contains 50 percent more plot than it needs" and sometimes developed in atypical ways for an action-suspense film. In a negative review, Hal Hinson of The Washington Post criticized Above the Law as "woefully short on originality." In another negative review, film historian Leonard Maltin described the picture as a "...slick but stupid action-fest; Seagal's thesping makes Chuck Norris seem like Laurence Olivier."

== Potential sequel ==
Seagal tweeted plans for Above the Law 2 on August 1, 2016, but as of 2026 the project remains unproduced.
