= Homesick (2025 book) =

2025 book

- Authors: Peter Apps
- Language: English
- Genre: Non-fiction
- Publication date: 2025
- Publication place: United Kingdom

Homesick: How Housing Broke London and How to Fix It is a 2025 book by Peter Apps.

== Critical reception ==
Sinéad Gibney of The Irish Times praised the book as "a brilliant capture of the recent history of housing in one specific location... detailed but incredibly digestible."

Emma Duncan of The Times gave the book a mixed review, saying that Apps "knows his stuff and writes with a confident understanding of the politics and business of housing," while warning that "readers who are not from the left will find much to dislike about this book," saying that Apps presented the state's withdrawal from housing as an unequivocal disaster, that Apps overly romanticised the pre-1980s council estates, that Apps sanctified poverty, and that the solutions he proposes (such as rent control) are ineffective.
