= Steven Seagal: Lawman =

American reality television series

- Genre: Reality
- Starring: Steven Seagal
- Country of origin: United States
- Original language: English
- No. of seasons: 3
- No. of episodes: 32

Production
- Executive producers: David McKillop; Harvey Wilson; Jake Laufer; John X. Kim; Neil A. Cohen; Phillip B. Goldfine; Steven Seagal
- Producer: Binh Dang
- Running time: 22 minutes
- Production companies: ITV Studios; Steamroller Films

Original release
- Network: A&E (2009–10); Reelz (2014)
- Release: December 2, 2009 – February 13, 2014

Steven Seagal: Lawman is an American reality television series that aired on A&E for its first two seasons and Reelz for its third. It stars actor, martial artist and musician Steven Seagal, performing his duties as a reserve deputy sheriff in Jefferson Parish, Louisiana (season 1–2) and Maricopa County, Arizona (season 3). It premiered on December 2, 2009.

"I've been working as an officer in Jefferson Parish for two decades under most people's radar", said Seagal in the premiere episode, "The Way of the Gun." Seagal continues "I've decided to work with A&E on this series now because I believe it's important to show the nation all the positive work being done here in Louisiana—to see the passion and commitment that comes from the Jefferson Parish Sheriff's Office in this post-Katrina environment." Seagal's current rank of Reserve Deputy Chief is largely ceremonial.

== History ==
According to Seagal, in the late 1980s, Jefferson Parish's longtime sheriff, Harry Lee, asked Seagal to train some of his deputies in martial arts. The actor further claimed that the success of these classes led to Lee asking Seagal to join the department as a reserve deputy. The Peace Officer Standards & Training organization, which accredits police officers, had no record of Seagal being certified.

== Production ==
On April 14, 2010, The Jefferson Parish Sheriff's Office announced that production of second season episodes had been halted due to a lawsuit filed against Steven Seagal on April 12, 2010, by his former personal assistant, Kayden Nguyen. Nguyen claimed Seagal committed sexual harassment, illegally trafficked women for sex, failed to prevent sexual harassment, retaliated against her, wrongly terminated her employment, and made false representations about her employment. Nguyen also alleges that she was asked to join Seagal's harem, which included two Russian women; Nguyen was to be a replacement. On April 13, 2010, Seagal's attorney Marty Singer said that the lawsuit was "... a ridiculous and absurd claim by a disgruntled ex-employee who was fired". Nguyen sued for over one million dollars.

Jefferson Parish Sheriff Newell Normand announced he would not launch an investigation into Nguyen's accusations unless she filed a criminal complaint against him with the Jefferson Parish Sheriff's Department. She never filed a complaint and on July 15, 2010, Nguyen dropped her lawsuit. Six days later, it was announced on the A&E website's message board that new episodes of Steven Seagal: Lawman would begin airing in October 2010, but no specific date was given.

=== Season 3 ===
In February 2011, A&E announced that the series would begin production on Season 3 episodes. Two episodes were scheduled to be aired beginning on January 4, 2012. The episodes were announced by A&E, who created a Facebook page for the series and listed in the TV guide. Shortly before the episodes were to be aired, the web and Facebook pages about the series were removed. A&E made no announcements about the sudden suspension of Season 3 or whether there would be a third season. A&E didn't answer inquiries, letters, or emails from fans.

It was announced on May 16, 2013, that the third season would air on Reelz starting in January 2014. Episodes from the first two seasons began airing on June 6, 2013. Season 3 premiered on January 2, 2014, with the airing of two new episodes. A third new episode aired on January 9, 2014. While the remaining five episodes were released later in January and February.

== Episodes ==
=== Season 1 ===
No. overall	No. in season	Title	Original release date
1	1	"The Way of the Gun"	December 2, 2009
The team captures an armed carjacker after a car chase and tackles a convicted felon carrying a pistol. Seagal also teaches a fellow team member shooting techniques.
2	2	"The Deadly Hand"	December 2, 2009
After chasing a suspect with a gun, Steven Seagal teaches his team of sheriff's deputies some self-defense and weapons retention techniques. They deal with a brawl in a parking lot and detain the suspects, one of whom resists. Later the team encounter two men with a gun.
3	3	"Killer Canines"	December 9, 2009
The team attend a burglary-in-progress They call in the K-9 Unit. Later, they apprehend a man who broke into a woman's house while running away. Seagal introduces his guard dogs.
4	4	"Too Young to Die"	December 9, 2009
The team get a call to the scene of a car accident involving a two-year-old. Later, Steven deals with a teenager hiding a sawed-off shotgun. While off-duty, Steven visits the New Orleans Children's Hospital cancer ward and throws a benefit concert to raise money for the hospital.
5	5	"Firearms of Fury"	December 16, 2009
The team arrest a suspect who has a loaded .44 magnum and are called to the scene of a young man shot with a shotgun. The team train with a computerized crime simulator and a "real world" shoot house. Later they deal with a dangerous incident at a traffic stop.
6	6	"The Student Becomes the Master"	December 16, 2009
A man is beaten by an intruder and the team sort it out. New sheriff, Newell Normand, gets inducted.
7	7	"To Live or Die"	December 23, 2009
The team deal with two men who are robbed and shot. Later Steven and his partner Johnny help rebuild a home for a family who lost everything in Hurricane Katrina.
8	8	"Medicine Man"	December 30, 2009
The team deal with a chase, Colonel John Fortunato injures his knee. Steven takes him to a Chinese acupuncturist.
9	9	"Crack War"	January 6, 2010
The team respond to a routine disturbance call and find a large stash of drugs. Later, Steven and the guys cheer for a fellow officer as he competes in a "best legs" contest to raise money for a local drug rehabilitation center.
10	10	"A Parish Under Siege"	January 13, 2010
The team deal with a near-fatal car accident and find a bottle of rum in a car belonging to two men. The squad meet up with SWAT to help deal with rodents that are undermining the Parish's levee system.
11	11	"Street Justice"	January 20, 2010
The team investigate allegations of drug use at a local motel and find crack cocaine. they deal with two similar incidents. The next day Steven teaches martial arts to a group of young people to aid community development.
12	12	"Narc Force"	January 27, 2010
The team join with the narcotics unit for an undercover sting on a drug dealer, however, three suspicious young men prove themselves to be law-abiding citizens. Steven invites them to a Sheriff's office picnic where he and the SWAT team demonstrate a hostage rescue.
13	13	"Ruthless Judgment"	February 3, 2010
The team visit the scene of a man killed in a drive-by. Minutes later they attend to another shooting: a man found dead in his car. Later they catch four young men out late.The next night they find two of them carrying drugs.

=== Season 2 (2010) ===
No. overall	No. in season	Title	Original release date
14	1	"They Drive by Night"	October 6, 2010
Steven Seagal and his JPSO team spot an out-of-control car heading straight for oncoming traffic but are unable to prevent a head-on collision.
15	2	"Blade Master"	October 6, 2010
Steven Seagal tests out a rare Japanese sword. A routine traffic stop turns into a dangerous high-speed chase.
16	3	"Crossfire"	October 13, 2010
Steven Seagal and his team respond to two shootings only minutes apart and discover that dangerous gunmen are running loose.
17	4	"The Perfect Target"	October 13, 2010
"Team Seagal" run across an intoxicated man waving a fully loaded gun on a highway.
18	5	"On Dangerous Ground"	October 20, 2010
Steven Seagal and his team get called by the narcotics unit to raid a suspected drug dealer.
19	6	"Gimme Shelter"	October 27, 2010
Steven Seagal befriends a rescue pitbull at a local shelter and makes it his mission to save him from being euthanized.
20	7	"The Innocents"	November 3, 2010
Seagal and his team attend two drug busts where the dealers choose to keep their stashes close by their children.
21	8	"Under the Influence"	November 10, 2010
Seagal recommends ancient remedies when members of the team fall sick.They also execute a no-knock warrant and chase down a suspect by foot.

=== Season 3 (2014) ===
No. overall	No. in season	Title	Original release date
22	1	"Drug Warriors"	January 2, 2014
Steven Seagal is now working with the Maricopa County Sheriff's Office. This new group head in to the desert to intercept a drug shipment. Alongside SWAT, Seagal responds to a narcotics sting.
23	2	"Righteous Justice"	January 2, 2014
The team serve a warrant on a man accused of running over a fellow officer. In process, they make a traffic stop on a self-proclaimed pastor trolling the streets for crack.
24	3	"Cops and Cons"	January 9, 2014
Serving door-knock arrest warrants presents a challenge when the suspects refuse to come out. Seagal offers the team an acting class in preparation for a mother/daughter takedown.
25	4	"Above the Border"	January 16, 2014
After surveying desert smuggling routes, Seagal and the SWAT team attend a hostage situation involving people smugglers. The team respond to a narco-smuggling operation in Vekol Valley
26	5	"The Knife's Edge"	January 23, 2014
The team assists with apprehending a suspected rapist. In preparation for their next warrant, Seagal offers the team a martial arts lesson.
27	6	"Ancient Secrets"	January 30, 2014
Seagal attempts to apply the teachings of Sun Tzu to a suspect apprehension and a negotiation.
28	7	"Blood in the Sand"	February 6, 2014
Suspecting a man may have ties to the Mexican drug cartels and illegal cockfighting, Seagal and the SWAT team raid the man's compound.
29	8	"Sensei and Student"	February 13, 2014
Steven helps a friend's son sort out personal and professional issues; the team works to bring in a couple wanted for prescription-drug fraud.

== Reception ==
The debut episode drew a network record 3.4 million viewers.

Critical reception to the series was mixed. Tim Goodman of the San Francisco Chronicle praised the show for being "compelling", and praised Steven Seagal for keeping his law enforcement career largely a secret "... even when his career could have used a boost". However, Alan Sepinwall of The Star-Ledger excoriated the series and its star: "... with his new reality show ... Seagal has cemented his position as an accidental comedy savant. It's easily the funniest thing he's done since the climactic speech from On Deadly Ground (his infamous directorial debut about evil oil companies polluting the Alaskan wilderness), and one of the more entertaining additions to the Has-Beens On Parade reality subgenre".

=== Lawsuit ===
Following season 3 episode 7, Steven Seagal and the Maricopa County Sheriff's Office were sued by the cockfighting suspect, Jesus Llovera. The raid, which involved multiple deputies and armored vehicles, resulted in the deaths of hundreds of roosters and a puppy. Llovera sought $100,000 and a written apology from Seagal to his children for killing their puppy.

=== Questions over Seagal's law enforcement credentials ===
Steven Seagal claims to hold certification by the California Peace Officer Standards and Training (POST) commission. However, according to a Los Angeles Times commentary critical of the claims, neither the California nor Louisiana POST organizations have records of Seagal's certification. But in the state of Louisiana, POST accreditation is not required for people holding certain positions in law enforcement if they are partnered with a POST-accredited officer.

== Home releases ==
- Season 1 (2010, Australia, 2 discs)
1. "The Way of the Gun"
2. "The Deadly Hand"
3. "Killer Canines"
4. "Too Young to Die"
5. "Firearms of Fury"
6. "The Student Becomes the Master"
7. "To Live or Die"
8. "Crack War"
9. "A Parish Under Siege"
10. "Street Justice"
11. "Narc Force"
12. "Ruthless Judgment"

(Due to a production error, episode 8 ("Medicine Man"), was not included on the set.)

- Season 2 (2011, Australia, 2 discs)
1. "On Dangerous Ground"
2. "Crossfire"
3. "The Perfect Target"
4. "The Innocents"
5. "Under the Influence"
6. "They Drive by Night"
7. "Gimme Shelter"
8. "Blade Master"
