= Seagalogy =

2008 book by Vern

Seagalogy: A Study of the Ass-Kicking Films of Steven Seagal
- Author: Vern
- Language: English
- Genre: Non-fiction
- Publisher: Titan Books
- Publication date: 2008
- ISBN: 1-84576-927-9

Seagalogy: A Study of the Ass-Kicking Films of Steven Seagal is a book released in 2008 by Titan Books, ISBN 1-84576-927-9. It is credited to an author known by the mononym Vern. It is the first in-depth study to be published on the complete creative output of Steven Seagal. The book examines each Steven Seagal film from 1988's Above the Law to 2008's Pistol Whipped, as well as providing reviews of some of Seagal's other output: his music, his appearances in commercials and his energy drink. In 2012, an updated edition of the book was published, incorporating reviews from the intervening years including Seagal's work on the reality TV show Steven Seagal: Lawman.

== Contents ==
The book argues that certain specific themes and motifs remain present throughout Seagal's filmography, and examines them via auteur theory. Although auteur theory usually cites the film director as the source of a film's particular vision, Vern argues that Seagal's filmography represents an example of what he describes as the "badass auteur": typically an action star whose persona and interests recur throughout their filmography, regardless of director or other creative collaborators.

Vern describes themes including government corruption (particularly involving the CIA), environmentalism, and adoption of foreign cultures as being examples of recurrent motifs in Seagal's films. The first edition breaks Seagal's career into four chronological "eras", marked by specific differences in style and content. The 2012 updated edition adds a fifth era.

These chronological "eras" describe different phases of Seagal's career, and include the "Golden Era" (1988–1991), the period of Seagal's first successes, the "Silver Era" (1992–1997), during which Seagal saw the peak of his fame and made high-profile blockbusters, a "Transitional Period" (1998–2002) during which he made lower-profile or ensemble films, a lengthy "direct-to-video" period (his most prolific to date, 2003–2008) and, in the 2012 updated addition, a "Chief Seagal" period (2009–present) during which Seagal moved into television and began reflecting elements of his Steven Seagal: Lawman persona in his films.

The book focuses almost exclusively on Seagal's artistic output at the expense of his career and personal life. Biographical details (for instance, his legal issues with producer Julius R. Nasso) appear only in the context of discussing their possible impact on his artistic choices.
