= Steven Seagal =

American actor, martial artist, and filmmaker (born 1952)

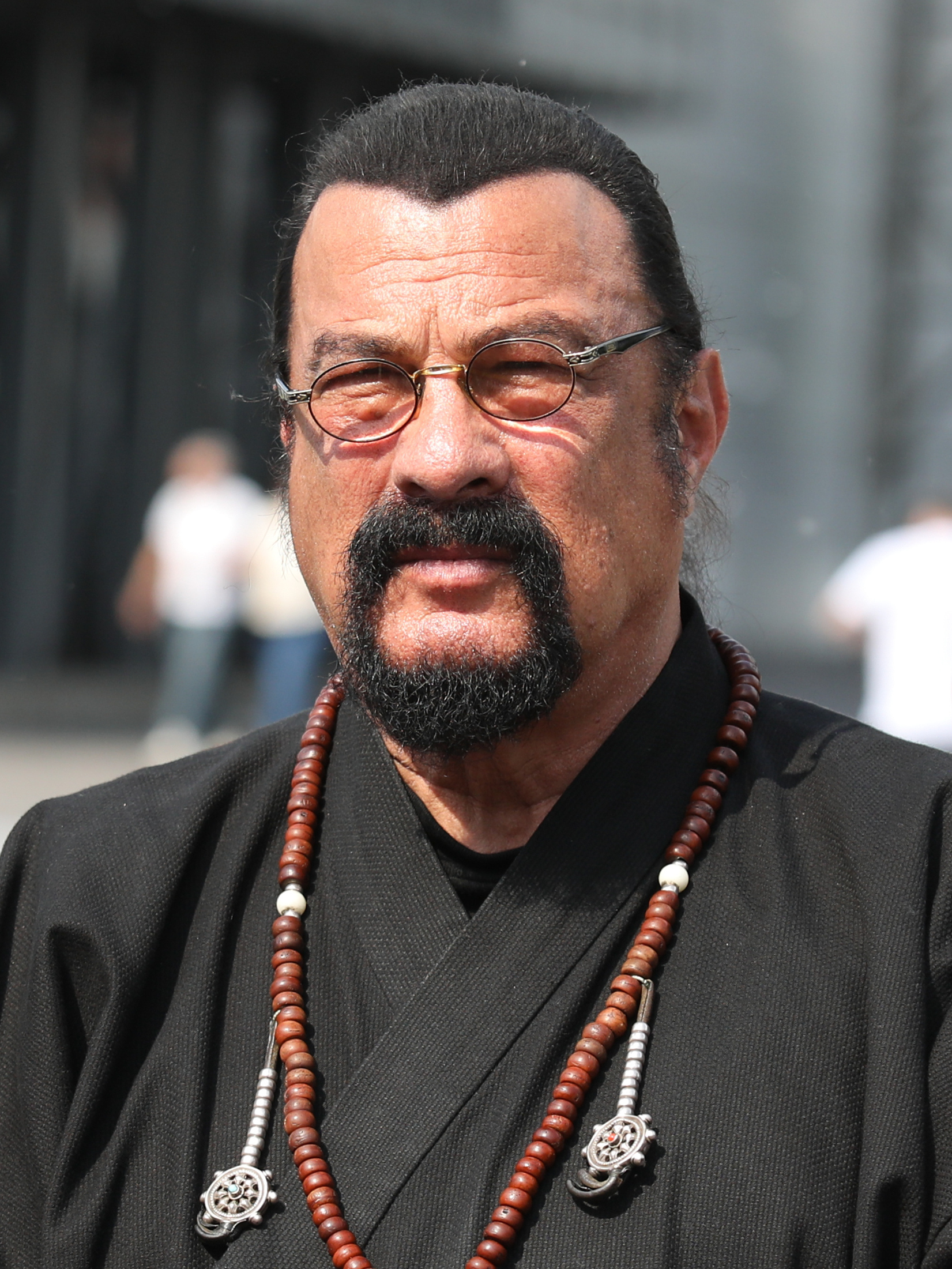
- Seagal in 2024
- Born: Steven Frederic Seagal; April 10, 1952 (age 74); Lansing, Michigan, U.S.
- Citizenship: United States; Serbia; Russia
- Occupations: Actor; writer; producer; martial artist; musician
- Years active: 1982–present
- Style: Aikido
- Height: 6 ft 4 in (1.93 m)
- Spouses: Miyako Fujitani (m. 1975; div. 1986); Adrienne La Russa (m. 1984; ann. 1984); Kelly LeBrock (m. 1987; div. 1996); Erdenetuya Batsukh (m. 2009)
- Children: 7, including Ayako
- Website: stevenseagal.com

Steven Frederic Seagal (/sɪˈɡɑːl/ sih-GAHL; born April 10, 1952) is an American actor, producer, screenwriter, martial artist, and musician. A 7th-dan black belt and shihan in Aikikai aikido, he began his adult life as a martial arts instructor in Japan, where he became the first non-Japanese and American to operate an aikido dojo. He later moved to Los Angeles, where he continued teaching aikido. In 1988, Seagal made his acting debut in Above the Law, which is regarded as the first American film to feature aikido in fight sequences.

By 1991, he had starred in three commercially successful films, and went on to achieve greater fame in Under Siege (1992), where he played Navy SEAL counter-terrorist expert Casey Ryback, a role he reprised in the sequel Under Siege 2: Dark Territory (1995). In 1994, he starred in his directorial debut film On Deadly Ground. During the latter half of the 1990s, Seagal starred in three more feature films and the direct-to-video film The Patriot. Subsequently, his career shifted to mostly direct-to-video productions. He has since appeared in films and reality shows, most notably as the main villain in Robert Rodriguez's Machete (2010), and Steven Seagal: Lawman, which depicted Seagal performing duties as a reserve deputy sheriff.

Seagal is a guitarist and has released two studio albums, Songs from the Crystal Cave and Mojo Priest, and performed on the scores of several of his films. He has worked with Stevie Wonder and Tony Rebel, who both performed on his debut album. He has been involved in a line of "therapeutic oil" products and energy drinks. Seagal is an environmentalist, animal rights activist, and supporter of 14th Dalai Lama Tenzin Gyatso. In 2004, he was inducted into the Martial Arts History Museum Hall of Fame.

Seagal has been the subject of controversy during his career. Since 1991, multiple women have accused Seagal of sexual harassment or assault. A supporter of Vladimir Putin, he backed the Russian annexation of Crimea in 2014 and the Russian invasion of Ukraine in 2022. He was granted both Russian and Serbian citizenship in 2016. In 2018, he was appointed Russia's special envoy to the U.S.

== Early life ==
Steven Seagal was born on April 10, 1952, in Lansing, Michigan, the son of Patricia Anne Fisher, a medical technician, and Samuel Seagal, a mathematics teacher. His mother was of Irish descent, while his father was Jewish. His paternal grandparents were Russian Jewish immigrants. During an interview for the Russian talk show Let Them Talk, Seagal stated that he has paternal ancestors from the Siberian city of Vladivostok, as well as Belarus and Saint Petersburg. He claims that genetic testing determined that he has Yakut and Buryat ancestry as well. When he was 5, Seagal moved with his parents to Fullerton, California. His mother later told People magazine that prior to the move Seagal was frail and suffered from asthma: "He was a puny kid back then. But he really thrived after the move [to California]."

Seagal attended Buena Park High School in Buena Park, California, and Fullerton College between 1970 and 1971. Seagal has been described as a "pathological liar" due to his propensity of making greatly exaggerated or outright fabricated statements about his personal life and achievements. For instance, Seagal has stated that he was a student of the founder of aikido, Morihei Ueshiba, despite the fact that Ueshiba died in 1969 when Seagal was 17 and five years before Seagal moved to Japan at age 22 — when he moved there to avoid the draft for the Vietnam War by marrying a Japanese national.

== Martial arts and Japan ==
According to Seagal's first wife, Miyako Fujitani: "I met Steven in California in the fall of 1974. He followed me back to Japan in October. We got married in December 1974." Fujitani was a second-degree black belt and daughter of a Jūsō, Osaka aikido master who had come to Los Angeles to teach aikido. After they married, they had a son, Kentaro, and a daughter, Ayako. Seagal taught at the school owned by Miyako's family and earned his aikido black belt in 1978. While there, he ran the Fujitani family dojo on behalf of Miyako's retired father, making him the first westerner to operate an Aikido dojo. Interviewed in 1993, Fujitani stated that: "The only reason Steven was awarded the black belt was because the judge, who was famous for his laziness, fell asleep during Steven's presentation. The judge just gave him the black belt."

Seagal has claimed that he helped train CIA agents in Japan: "They saw my abilities, both with martial arts and with the language. You could say that I became an advisor to several CIA agents in the field, and through my friends in the CIA, I met many powerful people and did special works and favors." Fujitani has refuted these allegations and has also dismissed Seagal's claims that he had combatted yakuza. There is no evidence that Seagal has ever worked with the Central Intelligence Agency. In the early-1980s, Seagal had aspirations to return to America and become a movie star. Fujitani then "scrimped and saved for years, even denying herself and her children necessities, to help pay his way home." According to Fujitani, he then availed himself of her savings and hied off.

Seagal returned to Taos, New Mexico, with his student (and later film stuntman) Craig Dunn, where they opened a dojo, although Seagal spent much of his time pursuing other ventures. After another period in Japan, Seagal returned to the United States in 1983 with senior student Haruo Matsuoka. They opened an aikido dojo, initially in North Hollywood, but later moved it to the city of West Hollywood. Seagal left Matsuoka in charge of the dojo, which the latter ran until the two parted ways in 1997. In the early 1980s, Seagal had his first experiences in the film industry by working as a fight coordinator on The Challenge (1982), which was shot in Japan, and Never Say Never Again (1983).

Later in his career, Seagal helped train Brazilian mixed martial artist Lyoto Machida, who credited Seagal for helping him perfect the front kick that he used to knock out Randy Couture at UFC 129 in May 2011.

== Acting career ==
=== 1987–1993: Hollywood action star ===
In 1987, Seagal began work on his first film as an actor, Above the Law (titled Nico in Europe), with director Andrew Davis. Seagal was asked to make the film by agent Michael Ovitz, who reportedly became convinced that Seagal had movie star potential after taking aikido classes with him. Ovitz financed Seagal's successful screen test, which led Seagal to be offered a contract by Warner Bros. Ovitz's role in starting Seagal's acting career led to a long-standing, unfounded rumor that the agent had made a bet that he could turn anyone into a movie star and decided to bank on his martial arts teacher to win his wager. Above the Law was a success, grossing $18,869,631 in the U.S. and Roger Ebert of the Chicago Sun-Times stated "It contains 50 percent more plot than it needs, but that allows it room to grow in areas not ordinarily covered in action thrillers." Following its success, Seagal's subsequent movies were Hard to Kill, Marked for Death, and Out for Justice; all were box office hits and made Seagal an action hero. Janet Maslin of The New York Times wrote, "Mr. Seagal is effective for both his novelty value and his ability to be both literally and figuratively disarming."

Seagal achieved mainstream success in 1992 with the release of Under Siege, which reunited him with director Andrew Davis for what critics described as "Die Hard on a battleship". Rotten Tomatoes gives the film a score of 83% based on reviews from 30 critics. The site's consensus states: "A well-directed action thriller that makes the most of its confined setting, Under Siege marks a high point for early '90s action—and its star's spotty filmography." Reviewers praised Tommy Lee Jones and Gary Busey's performances as the film's villains, and it is often considered Seagal's best film to date.

==== Hosting Saturday Night Live ====
On April 20, 1991, Seagal hosted Season 16, Episode 18 of Saturday Night Live. The series' long-time executive producer Lorne Michaels and cast-members David Spade and Tim Meadows called Seagal the show's "worst host ever". Spade and Meadows cited Seagal's humorlessness, his ill-treatment of the cast and writers, and his refusal to do a "Hans and Franz" sketch because the skit's title characters had previously said that they could "beat up Steven Seagal". Seagal has never been invited back to the show. Meadows commented, "He didn't realize that you can't tell somebody they're stupid on Wednesday and expect them to continue writing for you on Saturday."

SNL cast member Julia Sweeney later recalled that Seagal "had this idea that he's a therapist and he wanted Victoria Jackson to be his patient who's just been raped. And the therapist says, 'You're going to have to come to me twice a week for like three years'," because, he said, 'That's how therapists freaking are. They're just trying to get your money.' And then he says that the psychiatrist tries to have sex with her." The cast and crew's difficulties with Seagal were later echoed on-air by Michaels during guest host Nicolas Cage's monologue in the September 26, 1992, Season 18 premiere. When Cage worried that he would do so poorly that the audience would regard him as "the biggest jerk who's ever been on the show", Michaels replied: "No, no. That would be Steven Seagal."

=== 1994–2002: Career fluctuations ===
Seagal directed and starred in On Deadly Ground (1994), featuring Michael Caine, R. Lee Ermey, and Billy Bob Thornton in minor supporting roles. The film emphasized environmental and spiritual themes, signaling a break with his previous persona as a genre-ready inner-city cop. On Deadly Ground was poorly received by critics, especially denouncing Seagal's long environmental speech in the film. Regardless, Seagal considers it one of the most important and relevant moments in his career. Seagal followed this with a sequel to one of his most successful films, Under Siege, titled Under Siege 2: Dark Territory (1995), for which he was paid $15 million. According to co-star Morris Chestnut, Seagal rewrote many of the scenes he was in. "The only time they really stuck to the script or had ad libs was the stuff when he really wasn't there. It was a lot of stuff, because at that time I think he was flying a helicopter, he was doing something... He would come to set, "Okay, you're gonna say this. I'm gonna say this and this is gonna happen and then you do that." That's how we did a lot of that movie."

In 1996, Seagal had a role in the Kurt Russell film Executive Decision, portraying a special ops soldier who appears in only the film's first 45 minutes. Former Warner Bros Vice President Bill Daly later stated Seagal agreed to the role in exchange for the studio forgiving him losing his director's salary due to going over-budget with On Deadly Ground. The same year, he filmed a police drama, The Glimmer Man (1996). In another environmentally conscious and commercially unsuccessful film, Fire Down Below (1997), he played an EPA Office of Enforcement and Compliance Assurance agent fighting industrialists dumping toxic waste in the Kentucky hills. After Fire Down Below his deal with Warner Bros. ended.

In 1998, Seagal made The Patriot, another environmental thriller which was his first direct-to-video release in the United States (though it was released theatrically in most of the world). Seagal produced this film with his own money, and the film was shot on-location on and near his farm in Montana. After producing Prince of Central Park, Seagal returned to Warner Bros. and cinema screens with the release of Exit Wounds in March 2001. The film had fewer martial arts scenes than Seagal's previous films, but it was a commercial success, taking almost $80 million worldwide. It was considered at the time to be a "comeback" for Seagal. However, Seagal was unable to capitalize on this success and his next two projects were both critical and commercial failures. The movie Ticker, co-starring Tom Sizemore and Dennis Hopper, was filmed in San Francisco before Exit Wounds, and went straight to DVD. Half Past Dead, starring hip-hop star Ja Rule, made less than $20 million worldwide. It was ranked in a Rotten Tomatoes editorial on the 100 worst movies of all time. Seagal was also nominated for Worst Actor at the 2002 Stinkers Bad Movie Awards and the 23rd Golden Raspberry Awards.

=== 2003–present: direct-to-video films and television ===
Other than his role as a villain in Robert Rodriguez's Machete (2010), almost all the films Seagal has made since the latter half of 2001 have been released direct-to-video (DTV) in North America, with some theatrical releases to other countries around the world. Seagal is credited as a producer and sometimes a writer on many of these DTV movies, which include Black Dawn, Belly of the Beast, Out of Reach, Submerged, Kill Switch, Urban Justice, Pistol Whipped, Against the Dark, Driven to Kill, A Dangerous Man, Born to Raise Hell, and The Keeper. Beyond the Law (2019) is one of Seagal's few movies to have had a theatrical release in North America since Machete.

In 2009, A&E Network premiered the reality television series Steven Seagal: Lawman, focusing on Seagal as a deputy in Jefferson Parish, Louisiana. In the 2010s, Seagal's direct-to-video films increasingly started to become ensemble pieces, with Seagal playing minor or supporting roles, despite the fact that he often received top billing. Maximum Conviction, Force of Execution, Gutshot Straight, Code of Honor, Sniper Special Ops, The Asian Connection, The Perfect Weapon, Cartels, and China Salesman all exemplify this trend. This has led some commentators to criticize Seagal for his low-effort participation in movies which heavily promote his involvement.

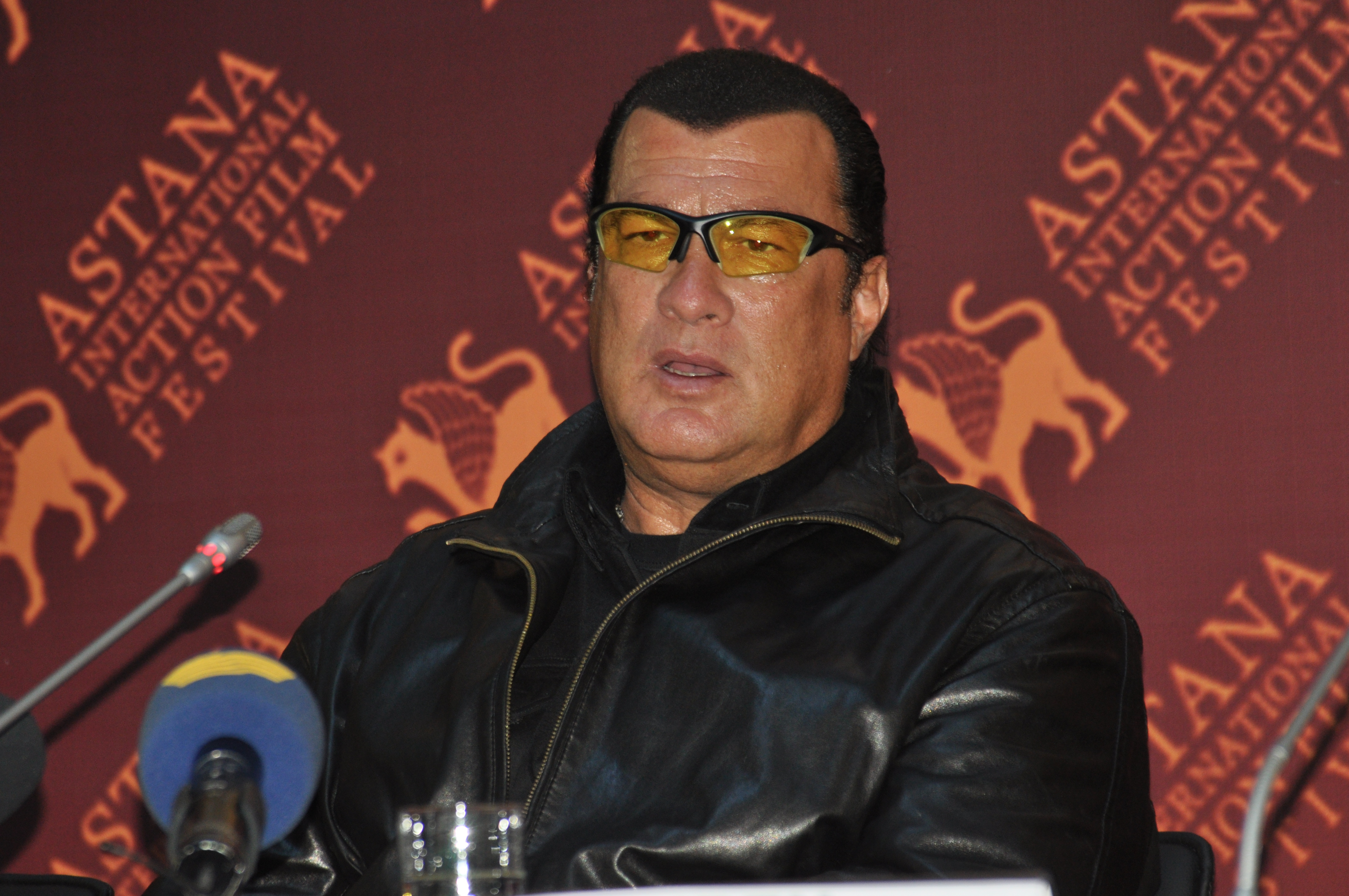
Seagal speaking at the Astana International Action Film Festival in July 2011

In 2011, Seagal produced and starred in an American television action series entitled True Justice. The series first aired on Nitro, a TV station in Spain, on May 12, 2011. It premiered in the UK on 5 USA, with the first episode broadcast July 20, 2011. The series was renewed for a second season airing on ReelzChannel. In the UK, True Justice was repackaged as a series of DVD movies, with each disc editing together two episodes.

== Influence and artistry ==
At the height of his career, Seagal was one of the biggest action movie stars in the world, and one of the most successful martial arts actors of the 1980s and 1990s, alongside Jean-Claude Van Damme. Credited with popularising aikido in film, Seagal is considered an important figure in the development and popularization of East Asian martial arts in the West.

Many of Seagal's films share unique elements which have become characteristic of his body of work. His characters often have an elite past affiliation with the CIA, special forces, or black ops (for example, Casey Ryback in Under Siege, a former Navy SEAL; Jack Cole in The Glimmer Man, an ex-CIA police detective; or Jonathan Cold in The Foreigner and Black Dawn, an ex-CIA Black Ops freelancer). His characters differ from those of other action movie icons by virtue of their near-invulnerability; they rarely face any significant physical threat, easily overpowering any opposition and seldom facing bodily harm or even temporary defeat. Two notable exceptions are Executive Decision (1996), in which Seagal's character is introduced as a false protagonist only to be killed halfway through and Machete (2010), which features Seagal in a rare villainous role.

Seagal's films also frequently reflect aspects of his personal life. His music appears in several of his films (for example, Into the Sun and Ticker, where he appears as part of a bar band), as does his fluency in other languages (he speaks Japanese in Into the Sun) and religion (Buddhism features prominently in The Glimmer Man and Belly of the Beast). His past as an aikido teacher is also incorporated into several films, for example Above the Law (which opens with a montage of real-life photos from Seagal's own past) or Shadow Man, where he is seen giving an aikido demonstration. Several of his films also feature prominent political messages, most notably the environmentalism evident in On Deadly Ground.

While Seagal's acting in Above the Law gained praise from the likes of Roger Ebert, Seagal has repeatedly faced criticism from both critics and fans who accuse him of playing the same character in many of his movies, as well as displaying a lack of emotional range. In fact, his typecasting has been informally referred to as "Seagalism" and has become the subject of much parody. In 2008, author and critic Vern published Seagalogy, a work which examines Seagal's filmography using the framework of auteur theory. Vern describes themes of government corruption (particularly involving the CIA), environmentalism, and adoption of foreign cultures as being examples of recurrent motifs in Seagal's films, among a variety of others. The first edition breaks Seagal's career into four chronological "eras", marked by specific differences in style and content. The 2012 updated edition adds a fifth era.

These chronological "eras" describe different phases of Seagal's career, and include the "Golden Era" (1988–1991), the period of Seagal's first successes, the "Silver Era" (1992–1997), during which Seagal saw the peak of his fame and made high-profile blockbusters, a "Transitional Period" (1998–2002) during which he made lower-profile or ensemble films, a lengthy "direct-to-video" period (his most prolific to date, 2003–2008) and, in the 2012 updated addition, a "Chief Seagal" period (2009–present) during which Seagal moved into television and began reflecting elements of his Steven Seagal: Lawman persona in his films.

== Other ventures ==
=== Music ===
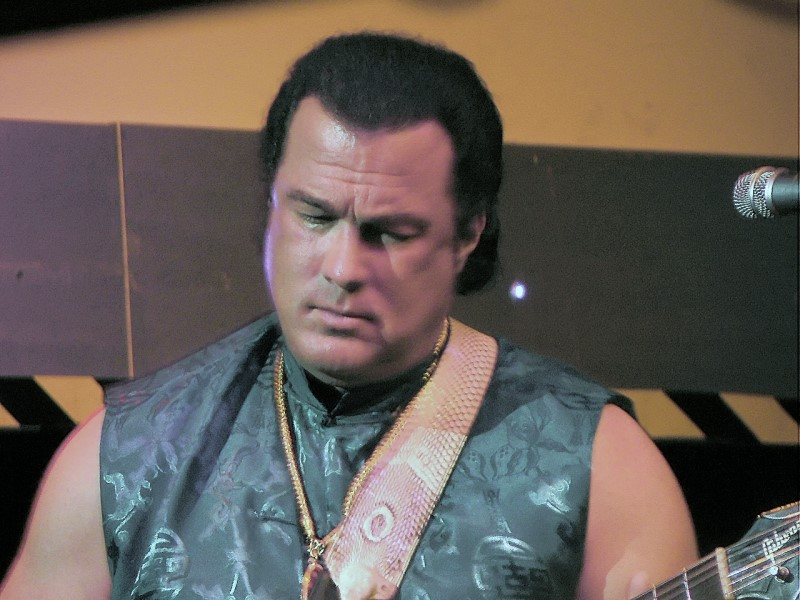
Seagal performing in 2007

Seagal plays the guitar and among his extensive collection are guitars previously owned by "the Kings"; Albert, BB, and Freddie, as well as Bo Diddley, Stevie Ray Vaughan, Buddy Guy, Howlin' Wolf, Muddy Waters, and Jimi Hendrix. In 2004, he released his first album, Songs from the Crystal Cave, which has a mix of pop, world, country, and blues music. It features duets with Tony Rebel, Lt. Stichie, Lady Saw, and Stevie Wonder. The soundtrack to Seagal's 2005 film Into the Sun features several songs from the album. One of his album tracks, "Girl It's Alright", was also released as a single in several countries alongside an accompanying music video. Seagal's second album, titled Mojo Priest, was released in April 2006; Seagal used the material to embark on a concert tour. Thom Jurek of AllMusic panned the album, rating it 1.5 stars out of 5 and stating that Seagal's guitar playing "rarely rises above bar band pedigree" and that "all of this music takes itself so seriously that it borders on delusional excess."

=== Law enforcement work ===
Seagal has been a Reserve Deputy Chief in the Jefferson Parish, Louisiana, Sheriff's Office. In the late 1980s, after teaching the deputies martial arts, unarmed combat, and marksmanship, then-sheriff Harry Lee (1932–2007) asked Seagal to join the force. Seagal's rank in Louisiana was ceremonial. Steven Seagal: Lawman, a series which follows his work in the Jefferson Parish Sheriff's Office, premiered on A&E on December 2, 2009. Seagal stated that "I've decided to work with A&E on this series now because I believe it's important to show the nation all the positive work being accomplished here in Louisiana—to see the passion and commitment that comes from the Jefferson Parish Sheriff's Office in this post-Katrina environment." The series premiere drew 3.6 million viewers, ranking as best season opener for any original A&E series ever.

On April 14, 2010, the series was suspended by Jefferson Parish Sheriff Newell Normand due to a sexual trafficking lawsuit filed against Seagal. The suit was later dropped. A&E resumed the show for the second season, which began on October 6, 2010. Production on Season 3 started in February 2011, with a change of location from Louisiana to Maricopa County, Arizona. Two episodes were scheduled to be aired, beginning on January 4, 2012. Shortly before the episodes were to be aired, Season 3 was suspended, with no explanations given. Season 3 premiered on January 2, 2014, but the show was not renewed for a fourth season. In October 2011, Seagal was sworn in as the Sheriff department's deputy sheriff of Hudspeth County, Texas, a law department responsible for patrolling a 98-mile stretch of the Texas–Mexico border.

=== Business ventures ===
In 1997, Seagal was to be featured in an action video game for the Nintendo 64 and the PlayStation called Deadly Honor, but it was cancelled for undisclosed reasons in its beta phase of development. In 2005, Seagal Enterprises began to market an energy drink known as "Steven Seagal's Lightning Bolt", but it has since been discontinued. Seagal has also marketed an aftershave called "Scent of Action", and a range of knives and weapons. In 2013, Seagal joined newly formed Russian firearms manufacturer ORSIS, representing the company in both a promotional capacity as well as lobbying for the easement of US import restrictions on Russian sporting firearms.

== Personal life ==
Seagal has an extensive sword collection, and at one time had a custom gun made for him once a month. Seagal owns a home in the Mandeville Canyon section of Los Angeles, and a home in Louisiana. He formerly lived on Staten Island in New York. Seagal is a Buddhist and in February 1997, Lama Penor Rinpoche from Palyul monastery announced that Seagal was a tulku, and specifically the reincarnation of Chungdrag Dorje, a 17th-century terton (treasure revealer) of the Nyingma, the oldest sect of Tibetan Buddhism.

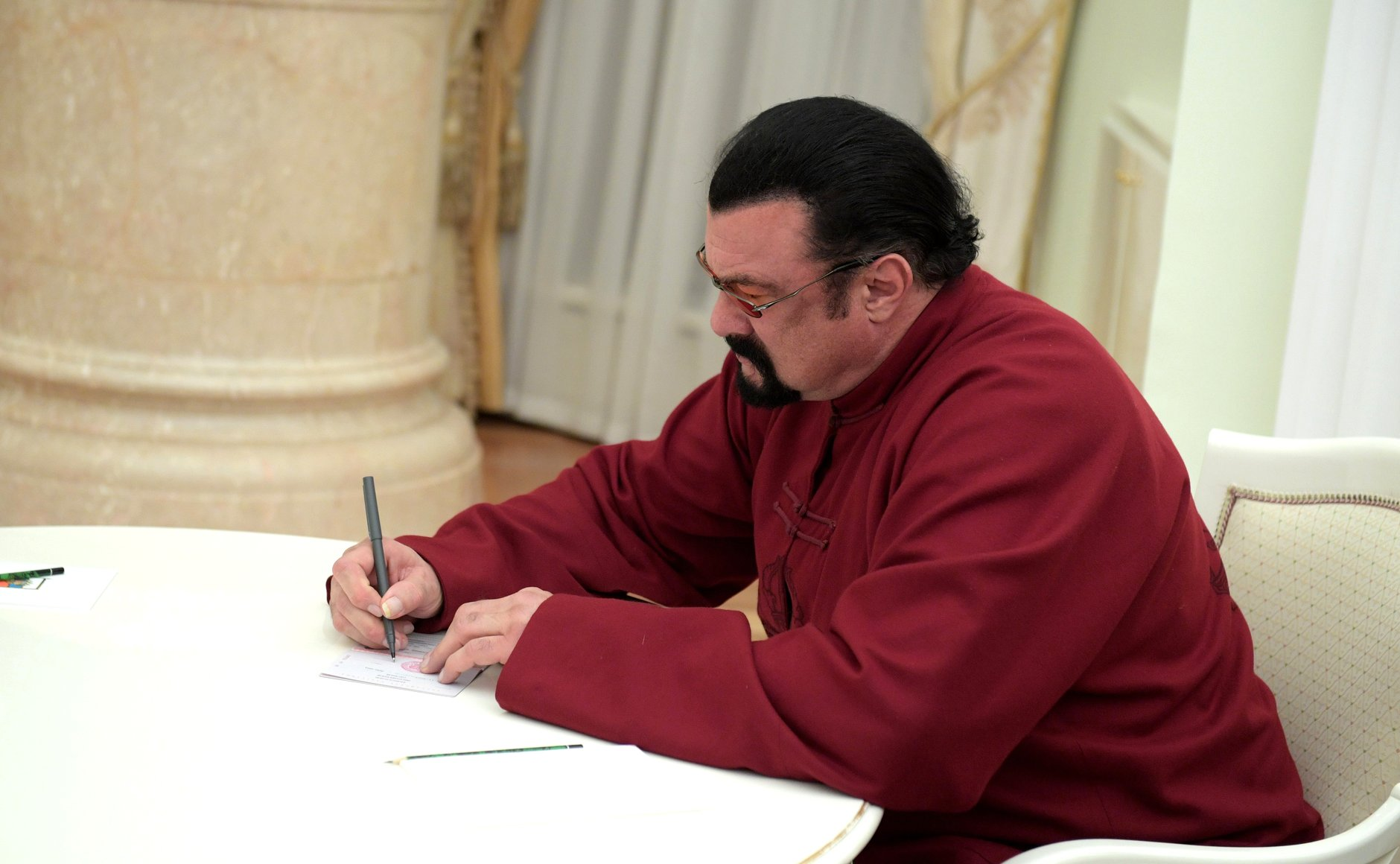
Seagal signing his Russian passport in November 2016

Seagal holds citizenships in three countries: the United States, Serbia, and Russia. Born in the United States, he possesses jus soli U.S. citizenship. He was granted Serbian citizenship on January 11, 2016, following several visits to the country, and has been asked to teach aikido to the Serbian Special Forces.

Seagal was granted Russian citizenship on November 3, 2016; according to government spokesman Dmitry Peskov, "He was asking quite insistently and over a lengthy period to be granted citizenship." Various media outlets have cited Seagal and President Vladimir Putin as friends and Seagal stated that he "would like to consider [Putin] as a brother". Putin bestowed the Russian award of Order of Friendship medal upon Seagal in 2023; Peskov has said of Putin: "he's definitely seen some of his movies."

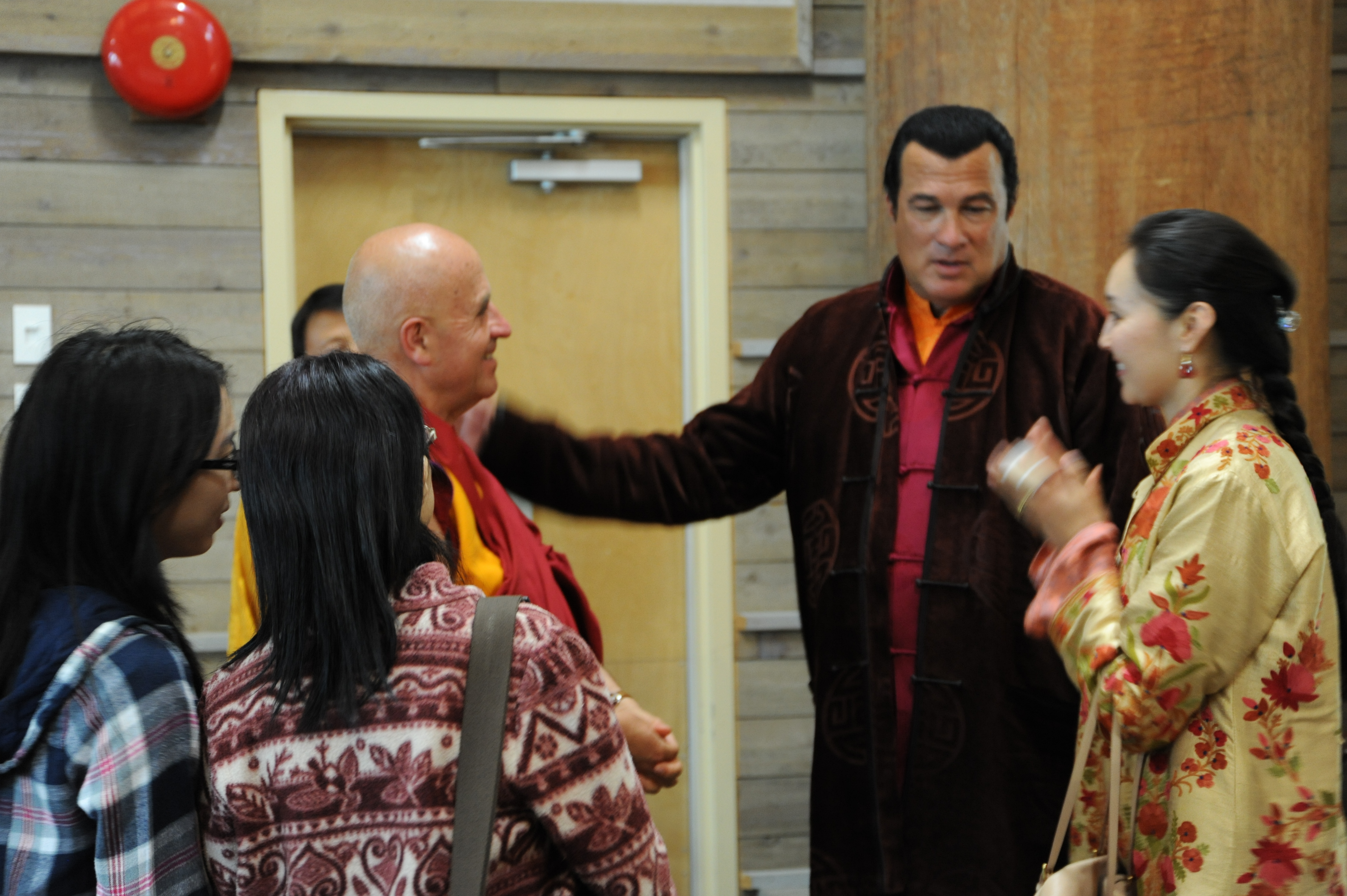
Seagal introduces his wife Erdenetuya Batsukh to Matthieu Ricard in January 2008.

While in Japan, Seagal married his first wife, Miyako Fujitani, the daughter of an aikido instructor. With Fujitani, he had a son, and a daughter, writer and actress Ayako Fujitani. Seagal left Miyako to move back to the United States. During this time, he met actress and model Kelly LeBrock, with whom he began an affair that led to Fujitani granting him a divorce. Seagal was briefly married to actress Adrienne La Russa in 1984, but that marriage was annulled the same year over concerns that his divorce had not yet been finalized. LeBrock gave birth to Seagal's daughter Annaliza in early 1987. Seagal and LeBrock married in September 1987; they have two children together. The following year, LeBrock filed for divorce citing "irreconcilable differences".

Seagal is married to Mongolian Erdenetuya Batsukh (Mongolian: Батсүхийн Эрдэнэтуяа), better known as "Elle". They have one son together, Kunzang.

In addition to his biological offspring, Seagal is the guardian of Yabshi Pan Rinzinwangmo, the only child of the 10th Panchen Lama of Tibet. When she studied in the United States, Seagal was her minder and bodyguard.

== Controversies ==
=== Allegations and lawsuits ===
In May 1991 (during the filming of Out for Justice), Warner Bros. employees Raenne Malone, Nicole Selinger, and Christine Keeve accused Seagal of sexual harassment. In return for remaining silent, Malone and another woman received around $50,000 each in an out-of-court settlement. Around the same time, at least four actresses said that Seagal had made sexual advances, typically during late-night "casting sessions". In another incident, Jenny McCarthy said that Seagal asked her to undress during an audition for Under Siege 2: Dark Territory.

In 1995, Seagal was charged with employment discrimination, sexual harassment, and breach of contract. Cheryl Shuman filed a case against Seagal, accusing him of threatening and beating her during the filming of On Deadly Ground. In August 1995, Los Angeles Superior Court Judge Hiroshi Fujisaki dismissed the case, calling the claims "repetitive and unintelligible".

On April 12, 2010, 23-year-old Kayden Nguyen filed a lawsuit against Seagal in a Los Angeles County Superior Court, requesting more than one million dollars in damages. In her suit, Nguyen alleged Seagal engaged in sexual harassment, the illegal trafficking of females for sex, failure to prevent sexual harassment, and wrongful termination. Seagal denied the allegations, but his reality show Steven Seagal: Lawman was suspended while his attorneys resolved the case. On July 14, 2010, three months after Nguyen filed her suit, she withdrew her claim without explanation.

On August 30, 2011, Jesus Sanchez Llovera filed a lawsuit against Seagal over his part in a Maricopa County police raid with heavy weapons (notably including an army surplus tank) of Llovera's residence for suspicion of cockfighting. The incident was taped for Seagal's A&E reality show Steven Seagal: Lawman. Llovera was seeking $100,000 for damages caused during the raid and a letter of apology from Seagal to Llovera's children for the death of their family pet. Llovera claimed that his 11-month-old puppy was shot and killed during the raid. Llovera failed to file court-ordered paperwork after his attorney withdrew from the case and the lawsuit was dismissed in January 2013.

In 2017, actress Portia de Rossi accused Seagal of sexually harassing her during a movie audition. De Rossi alleged that during an audition in Seagal's office, he told her "how important it was to have chemistry off-screen" before unzipping his pants. On an April 18 appearance on Jimmy Kimmel Live!, Katherine Heigl alleged on the final day of shooting for Under Siege 2 that Seagal told her that he had girlfriends the same age as the 16-year-old Heigl. Kimmel responded by displaying a photo from the film's promotional tour showing Seagal's hand on Heigl's chest while they posed for a photo. On November 9, 2017, Dutch model Faviola Dadis posted a statement on her Instagram account stating that she also had been sexually assaulted by Seagal years earlier.

On January 15, 2018, actress Rachel Grant publicly accused Seagal of sexually assaulting her in 2002, during pre-production on his direct-to-video film, Out for a Kill (2003), stating that she lost her job on the film after the incident. In February 2018, the Los Angeles County District Attorney's office acknowledged that it was reviewing a potential sex-abuse case involving Seagal.

In March 2018, Regina Simons publicly claimed that in 1993, when she was 18, Seagal raped her at his home when she arrived for what she thought was a wrap party for the movie On Deadly Ground. In September 2018, Los Angeles prosecutors refused to charge the actor based on Regina Simons's accusations, due to California's statute of limitations. Two months later, the case involving the actress Rachel Grant was dismissed for the same reasons.

=== Victim of attempted extortion ===
Seagal became embroiled in a legal case involving film producer Julius R. Nasso after Nasso attempted to extort Seagal. Nasso produced seven of Seagal's films beginning with Marked for Death in 1990. The two "became best friends", according to Seagal, and formed Seagal/Nasso Productions together. Their relationship became strained, however, and their partnership ended in 2000. Believing that Seagal owed him $3 million in compensation for backing out of a four-film deal, Nasso enlisted members of the Gambino crime family to threaten Seagal in an attempt to recoup money Nasso allegedly lost.

Gambino family captain Anthony Ciccone first visited Seagal in Toronto during the filming of Exit Wounds in October 2000. In January 2001, Primo Cassarino and other gangsters picked up Seagal by car to bring him to a meeting with Ciccone at a Brooklyn restaurant. At the meeting, Ciccone reportedly told Seagal that he had a choice of making four promised movies with Nasso or paying Nasso a penalty of $150,000 per movie, and that if Seagal refused, Ciccone would kill him.

Seagal, who later claimed that he brought a handgun to the meeting, was able to stall Ciccone and escape the meeting unharmed. In the spring of 2001, Seagal sought out another mobster, Genovese crime family captain Angelo Prisco, to act as a "peacemaker". He visited Prisco in prison at Rahway, New Jersey and paid Prisco's lawyer $10,000.

On March 17, 2003, Cassarino, Ciccone, and others were convicted of labor racketeering, extortion, and 63 other counts under the Racketeer Influenced and Corrupt Organizations Act. Seagal testified for the prosecution about the mobsters' extortion attempt. Nasso pleaded guilty to the charge of extortion conspiracy in August 2003. In February 2004, he was sentenced to a year and a day in prison, fined $75,000, and ordered to take mental health counseling on release from jail. In January 2008, Nasso agreed to drop a $60 million lawsuit against Seagal for an alleged breach of contract when the two settled out of court.

=== Conflicts with stuntmen ===
Seagal has been accused by former stunt performers who have worked with him, including Kane Hodder, Stephen Quadros, and Gene LeBell, of intentionally hitting stunt performers during scenes. Additionally, while serving as stunt coordinator for Out for Justice, LeBell allegedly got into an on-set altercation with Seagal over his mistreatment of some of the film's stunt performers. After the actor claimed that, due to his aikido training, he was "immune" to being choked unconscious, LeBell supposedly offered Seagal the opportunity to prove it. With Seagal's permission, LeBell then successfully choked him unconscious, with Seagal losing bowel control. Although LeBell has not directly confirmed the rumor, he implied that it was true in a 2012 interview. Seagal's bodyguard and stuntman Steven Lambert stated that a confrontation did happen, during which Seagal elbowed LeBell before he could lock the hold, after which LeBell flipped Seagal. Seagal has directly denied that a confrontation took place, calling LeBell a "sick, pathological scumbag liar".

Robart Wall included LeBell in his "Dirty Dozen", a list of martial artists willing to answer to a public challenge made by Seagal. LeBell however declined to participate, as the feud with Seagal was hurting him professionally. He did, however, criticize Seagal for his treatment of stunt performers and left open the possibility of a professional fight if Seagal wanted.

Allegations of mistreatment towards stuntmen have continued throughout Seagal's later career, with both stuntman Peter Harris Kent (Arnold Schwarzenegger's stunt double) and Mike Leeder publicly criticizing his on-set antics. Actor John Leguizamo also claimed that during rehearsals on Executive Decision, in retaliation for laughing at him, Seagal caught him off guard and knocked him into a brick wall. Michael Jai White, who acted with him in a number of movies, stated that he routinely hit stunt men, and that he was known for it. He said they just accepted it. However, he stated that Seagal never hit him.

== Political views and activism ==
Seagal lent his voice as a narrator for an activist film project, Medicine Lake Video. The project seeks to protect sacred tribal ground near Seagal's ranch in Siskiyou County. He also wrote an open letter to the leadership of Thailand in 2003, urging them to enact a law to prevent the torture of baby elephants. In 1999, Seagal was awarded a PETA Humanitarian Award.

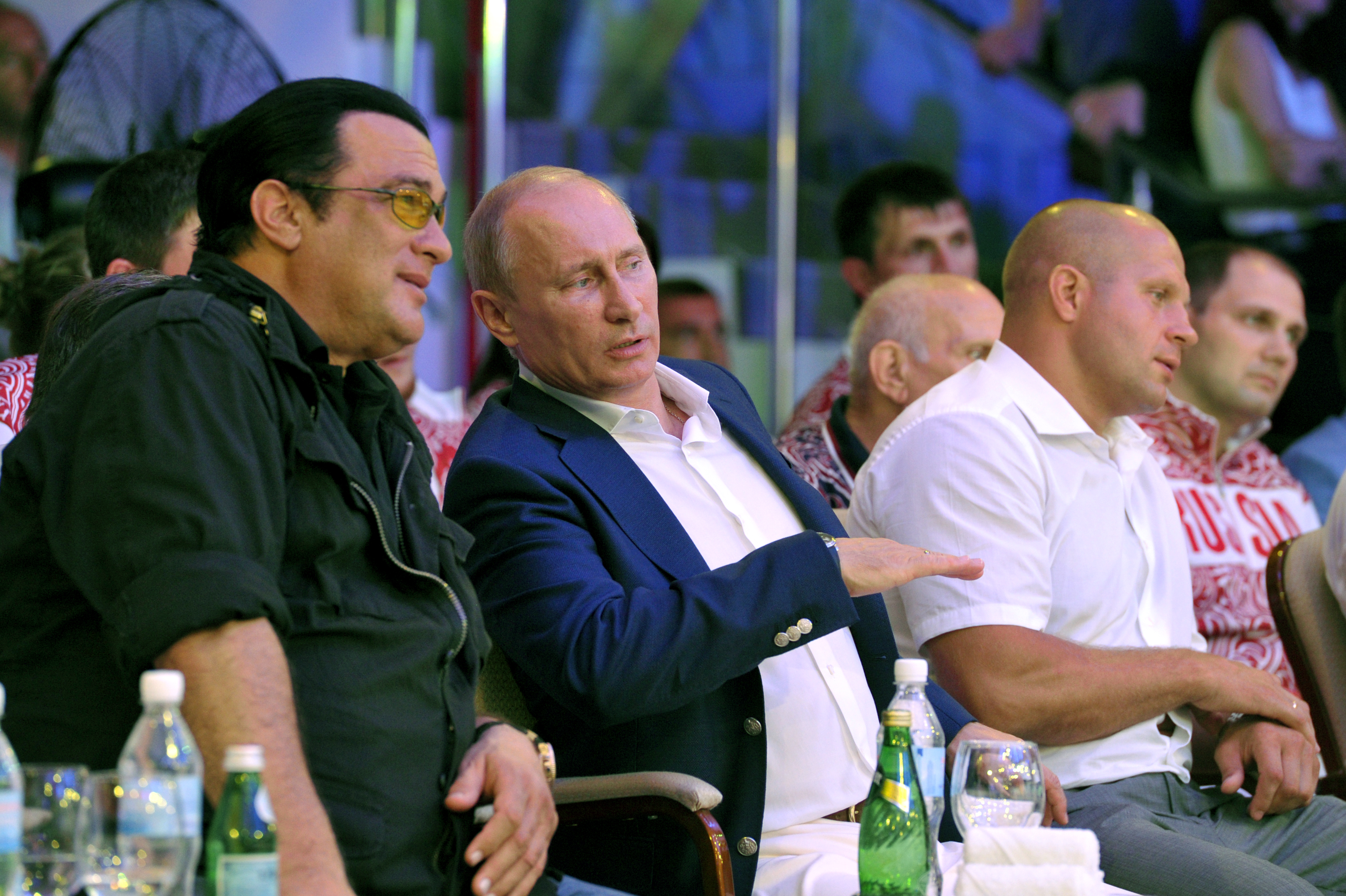
Seagal and Vladimir Putin attending a Russian martial arts championship in August 2012

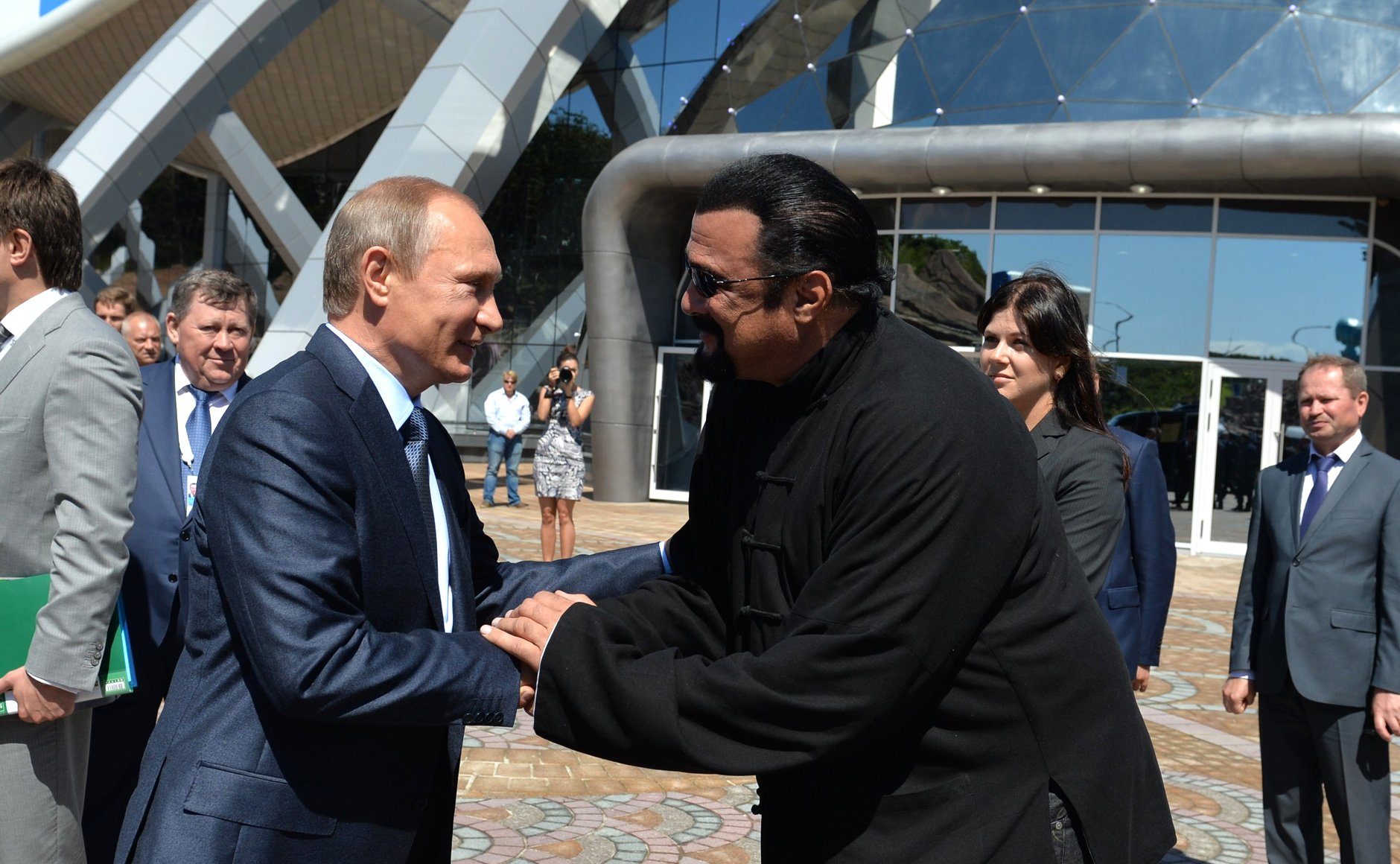
Seagal and Putin meeting at the aquarium on Russkiy Island in September 2015

In a March 2014 interview with Rossiyskaya Gazeta, Seagal described Vladimir Putin as "one of the great living world leaders". He expressed support for the annexation of Crimea by Russia. In July 2014, following calls for a boycott, Seagal was dropped from the lineup of the August Blues Festival in Haapsalu, Estonia. Estonian musician Tõnis Mägi, minister of Foreign Affairs Urmas Paet, and Parliament's Foreign Affairs chairman Marko Mihkelson had all condemned inviting Seagal into the country, with Paet saying, "Steven Seagal has tried to actively participate in politics during the past few months and has done it in a way which is unacceptable to the majority of the world that respects democracy and the rule of law."

In August 2014, Seagal appeared at a Night Wolves-organized show in Sevastopol, Crimea, supporting the Crimean annexation and depicting Ukraine as a country controlled by fascists. On November 3, 2016, Seagal was granted Russian citizenship by Putin. His views on Ukraine and Russian citizenship caused Ukraine to ban him from entering the country because he "committed socially dangerous actions".

Seagal visited the Republic of Azerbaijan in 2015 and met with the country's long-time president, Ilham Aliyev. Seagal has expressed support for Azerbaijan's territorial integrity and dispute with neighboring Armenia over the Nagorno-Karabakh conflict.

Seagal spoke out against the protests during the United States national anthem by professional athletes, stating, "I believe in free speech, I believe that everyone's entitled to their own opinion, but I don't agree that they should hold the United States of America or the world hostage by taking a venue where people are tuning in to watch a football game and imposing their political views." He also expressed skepticism of alleged Russian interference in the 2016 United States elections.

In 2017, Seagal collaborated with a former chair of the Arizona Republican Party, Tom Morrissey, in writing a self-published conspiracy thriller novel, The Way of the Shadow Wolves: The Deep State and the Hijacking of America, which featured a Tohono Shadow Wolf tracker working for U.S. Immigration and Customs Enforcement to foil a plot by Mexican drug cartels and the "deep state" to smuggle in Islamist terrorists to the United States through the U.S.–Mexico border.

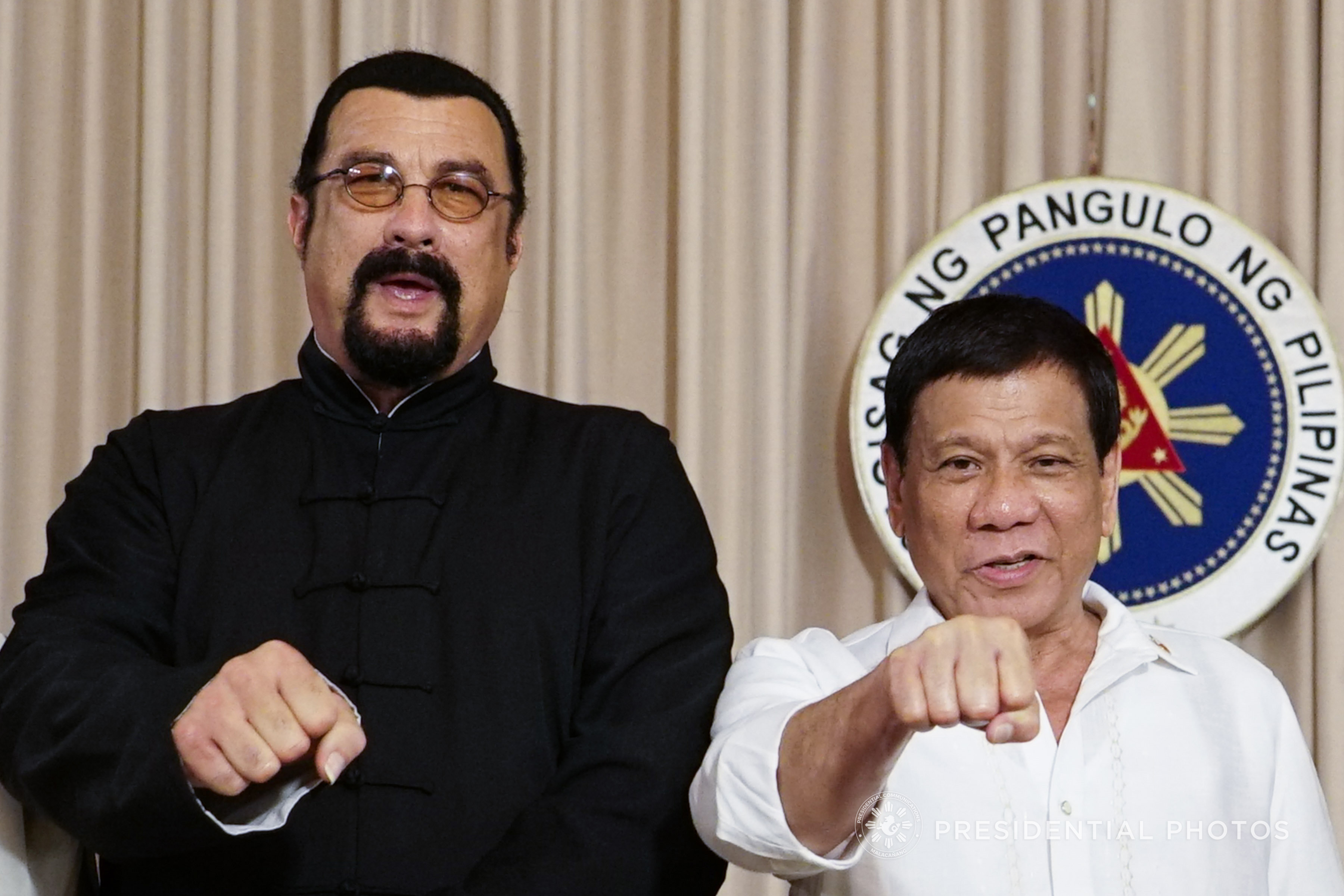
Seagal with Philippine President Rodrigo Duterte on October 12, 2017

In October 2017, Seagal met with Philippine president Rodrigo Duterte while scouting locations in Manila for a possible film. During the visit, Seagal flashed Duterte's signature fist.

In 2021, Seagal gave a katana to Venezuelan President Nicolás Maduro as Russia's Foreign Affairs Ministry special envoy while visiting Canaima National Park. Maduro referred to Seagal as "my brother." On May 30, 2021, the pro-Kremlin systemic opposition party A Just Russia — Patriots — For Truth announced that Seagal had received an official membership card to the party.

In March 2022, during the Russian invasion of Ukraine, Seagal visited Moscow where he organized his birthday party, attended by many people connected to Vladimir Putin, including some affected by international sanctions. This has been criticized as a dissenting action that came amidst the growing international boycott of Russia.

A few months later, in August 2022, he visited Olenivka in Donetsk Oblast, the site of the Olenivka prison massacre, with Donetsk People's Republic leader Denis Pushilin, who claimed that Seagal was filming a documentary about the war in Donbas. Seagal also met with Leonid Slutsky. On February 27, 2023, he received the Russian Order of Friendship from Vladimir Putin for his "major contribution to the development of international cultural and humanitarian cooperation". In June 2026 Seagal was one of the international attendees at the St Petersburg Economic Forum, where he was listed as a member of the "panel on culture".

== Filmography ==
=== Films ===
Year	Film	Functioned as					Notes
Year	Film	Director	Producer	Writer	Actor	Role	Notes
1988	Above the Law	No	Yes	Story	Yes	Nico Toscani	
1990	Hard to Kill	No	No	No	Yes	Mason Storm	
1990	Marked for Death	No	Yes	No	Yes	John Hatcher	
1991	Out for Justice	No	Yes	No	Yes	Det. Gino Felino	
1992	Under Siege	No	Yes	No	Yes	Casey Ryback	
1994	On Deadly Ground	Yes	Yes	No	Yes	Forrest Taft	
1995	Under Siege 2: Dark Territory	No	Yes	No	Yes	Casey Ryback	Sequel to Under Siege.
1996	Executive Decision	No	No	No	Yes	Lt. Colonel Austin Travis	Supporting role
1996	The Glimmer Man	No	Yes	No	Yes	Lt. Jack Cole	
1997	Fire Down Below	No	Yes	No	Yes	Jack Taggart	
1998	My Giant	No	No	No	Yes	Himself	Cameo
1998	The Patriot	No	Yes	No	Yes	Dr. Wesley McClaren	Direct-to-video
1998	Not Even the Trees	No	Yes	No	No		Direct-to-video
2000	Prince of Central Park	No	Yes	No	No		Direct-to-video
2001	The Path Beyond Thought	No	Executive	No	Yes	Himself/narrator	Documentary
2001	Exit Wounds	No	No	No	Yes	Orin Boyd	
2001	Ticker	No	No	No	Yes	Frank Glass	Limited release
2002	Half Past Dead	No	Yes	No	Yes	Sasha Petrosevitch	
2003	The Foreigner	No	Yes	No	Yes	Jonathan Cold	Direct-to-video
2003	Out for a Kill	No	Yes	No	Yes	Prof. Robert Burns	Direct-to-video
2003	Belly of the Beast	No	Yes	Story	Yes	Jake Hopper	Direct-to-video
2004	Out of Reach	No	Executive	No	Yes	William Lansing	Direct-to-video
2004	Clementine	No	No	No	Yes	Jack Miller	Limited release
2005	Into the Sun	No	No	Yes	Yes	Travis Hunter	Direct-to-video; Also received "story by" credit.
2005	Submerged	No	Executive	No	Yes	Chris Cody	Direct-to-video
2005	Today You Die	No	Yes	No	Yes	Harlan Banks	Direct-to-video
2005	Dragon Squad	No	Executive	No	No		Limited release
2005	Black Dawn	No	Yes	No	Yes	Jonathan Cold	Direct-to-video; Sequel to The Foreigner.
2006	Mercenary for Justice	No	Executive	Uncredited	Yes	John Seeger	Direct-to-video
2006	Shadow Man	No	Yes	Yes	Yes	Jack Foster	Direct-to-video
2006	Attack Force	No	Yes	Yes	Yes	Cmdr. Marshall Lawson	Direct-to-video
2007	Flight of Fury	No	Executive	Yes	Yes	John Sands	Direct-to-video
2007	Urban Justice	No	Yes	No	Yes	Simon Ballister	Direct-to-video
2008	Pistol Whipped	No	Yes	No	Yes	Matt Conlin	Direct-to-video
2008	The Onion Movie	No	No	No	Yes	Cock Puncher	Direct-to-video; Supporting role
2008	Kill Switch	No	Executive	Yes	Yes	Jacob King	Direct-to-video
2009	Against the Dark	No	No	No	Yes	Tao	Direct-to-video
2009	Driven to Kill	No	Executive	No	Yes	Ruslan Drachev	Direct-to-video
2009	The Keeper	No	Yes	Yes	Yes	Roland Sallinger	Direct-to-video
2009	A Dangerous Man	No	Executive	No	Yes	Shane Daniels	Direct-to-video
2010	Machete	No	No	No	Yes	Rogelio Torrez	Seagal's first wide release since 2002.
2010	Sheep Impact	No	No	No	Yes	Paul Weland	Short film
2010	Born to Raise Hell	No	Yes	Yes	Yes	Robert "Bobby" Samuels	Direct-to-video
2012	Maximum Conviction	No	No	No	Yes	Cross	Direct-to-video
2013	Force of Execution	No	Yes	No	Yes	John Alexander	Direct-to-video
2014	A Good Man	No	Yes	No	Yes	John Alexander	Direct-to-video; Prequel to Force of Execution.
2014	Gutshot Straight	No	No	No	Yes	Paulie Trunks	Direct-to-video; Supporting role
2015	Absolution	No	Yes	No	Yes	John Alexander	Direct-to-video; Sequel to A Good Man.
2016	Code of Honor	No	Executive	No	Yes	Robert Sikes	Direct-to-video
2016	Sniper Special Ops	No	Executive	No	Yes	Jake	Direct-to-video
2016	The Asian Connection	No	Executive	No	Yes	Gan Sirankiri	Direct-to-video
2016	End of a Gun	No	Yes	No	Yes	Decker	Direct-to-video
2016	Contract to Kill	No	Yes	No	Yes	John Harmon	Direct-to-video
2016	The Perfect Weapon	No	Executive	No	Yes	The Director	Direct-to-video
2017	Cartels	No	Yes	No	Yes	John Harrison	Direct-to-video
2017	China Salesman	No	No	No	Yes	Lauder	
2018	Attrition	No	Yes	Yes	Yes	Axe	Direct-to-video
2019	General Commander	No	No	No	Yes	Jake Alexander	Direct-to-video
2019	Beyond the Law	No	No	No	Yes	Augustino "Finn" Adair	Direct-to-video
2026	Order of the Dragon	No	No	No	Yes	Mason Ryker	Post-production

=== Television ===
Year	Film	Functioned as						Notes
Year	Film	Director	Writer	Creator	Executive producer	Actor	Role	Notes
1991	Saturday Night Live	No	No	No	No	Yes	Host	Seagal hosted the episode "Steven Seagal/Michael Bolton".
2009–2014	Steven Seagal: Lawman	No	No	Yes	Yes	Yes	Himself	
2011–2012	True Justice	No	Yes	Yes	Yes	Yes	Elijah Kane	
2017	Jack Whitehall: Travels with My Father	No	No	No	No	Yes	Himself	Impromptu segment in Season 1, Episode 3
2024	In the Name of Justice	Yes	No	Yes	No	Yes	Himself	TV documentary

=== Stunts ===
Year	Film	Functioned as			Notes
Year	Film	Martial arts instructor	Choreographer	Stunt coordinator	Notes
1982	The Challenge	No	No	Yes	Credited as "Steve Seagal".
1983	Never Say Never Again	Yes	No	No	Uncredited; Seagal accidentally broke Sean Connery's wrist during production.
1985	A View to a Kill	No	Yes	No	
1988	Above the Law	No	No	Yes	
1990	Hard to Kill	No	Yes	Yes	
1990	Marked for Death	No	No	Yes	
2013	Force of Execution	No	Yes	No	

== Awards and nominations ==
Year	Nominated work	Award	Category	Results
1995	On Deadly Ground	Golden Raspberry Awards	Worst Actor	Nominated
1995	On Deadly Ground	Golden Raspberry Awards	Worst Picture (shared with Julius R. Nasso and A. Kitman Ho)	Nominated
1995	On Deadly Ground	Golden Raspberry Awards	Worst Director	Won
1997	Executive Decision	Golden Raspberry Awards	Worst Supporting Actor	Nominated
1998	Fire Down Below	Golden Raspberry Awards	Worst Actor	Nominated
1998	Fire Down Below	Golden Raspberry Awards	Worst Picture (shared with Julius R. Nasso)	Nominated
1998	Fire Down Below	Golden Raspberry Awards	Worst Screen Couple (shared with "his guitar")	Nominated
1998	Fire Down Below	Golden Raspberry Awards	Worst Original Song (shared with Mark Collie for the song "Fire Down Below")	Nominated
2003	Half Past Dead	Golden Raspberry Awards	Worst Actor	Nominated

== Discography ==
- Songs from the Crystal Cave (2004)
- Mojo Priest (2006)
