= Eilidh =

Eilidh (/ˈeɪliː/ AY-lee; Scottish Gaelic pronunciation: [ˈe.lɪ]) is a Scottish Gaelic feminine given name. Although it is the equivalent of Ellie, it is usually anglicized as Helen.

Persons with the name include:

- Eilidh Adams (born 2004), Scottish footballer
- Eilidh Barbour (born 1982), Scottish television presenter
- Eilidh Doyle (born 1987), Scottish track and field athlete
- Eilidh Fisher, Scottish actress
- Eilidh Gibson (born 1995), Scottish slalom canoeist
- Eilidh MacQueen (born 1986), Scottish actress
- Eilidh Mackenzie, Scottish singer and member of Mac-Talla
- Eilidh McCreadie, Scottish radio drama director
- Eilidh McIntyre (born 1994), British sailor
- Eilidh Middleton (born 1990), Scottish equestrian
- Eilidh Shaw, Scottish fiddler
- Eilidh Watt (1908–1996), Scottish Gaelic broadcaster and writer
- Eilidh Whiteford (born 1969), Scottish National Party politician

== See also ==
- Helensburgh, Argyll (Scottish Gaelic: Baile Eilidh)
