= Julius R. Nasso =

American film producer

- Born: October 19, 1952 (age 74); Aspromonte, Calabria, Italy
- Occupations: Film producer, pharmacologist, and businessman
- Years active: 1974–present
- Notable work: Narc
- Website: Official website

Julius R. "Jules" Nasso (born October 19, 1952) is an Italian-American film producer, pharmacologist, and businessman. He is a 20-year Directors Guild of America member. His production of Narc (2002), starring Jason Patric, Ray Liotta, and Busta Rhymes, which was nominated for the Sundance Film Festival's Grand Jury Award and won the Special Prize Policier Award at the Cognac Film Festival in France.

== Early life ==
Nasso was born in the village of Terranova in Calabria. At the age of two, his family moved to the Brooklyn borough of New York, where he was raised. In 1976, Nasso graduated from St. John's University with a Bachelor of Science degree in pharmacy. He then earned an advanced Doctor of Pharmacy degree from the University of Connecticut.

== Business career ==
=== Universal Marine Medical Supply Company (UMMSC) ===
Nasso established Universal Marine Medical Supply Company (UMMSC) in 1974 while attending college. UMMSC provides medical supplies, equipment, and services globally.

=== Tishcon Corporation ===
In 1977, Nasso co-created the private label vitamin and health supplement manufacturing company Tishcon Corporation with his college pharmacy professor Dr. Satish Patel. In 1985, the company was sold to Cosmo Laboratories.

=== Cabbage Patch Babyland ===
In 1978, Nasso capitalized on the Cabbage Patch craze along with Xavier Roberts. He opened the Cabbage Patch Babyland General Hospital Store in 1978.

== Film career ==
Nasso's film career started in 1980 when he joined Sergio Leone as his personal assistant. He worked for Leone during the 1980 filming of Once Upon a Time in America in New York. In 1987, Nasso began a business partnership with Steven Seagal while Seagal was working on his first film, Above the Law, for Warner Bros. Pictures. He was responsible for the international marketing of the film.

Nasso and Seagal "became best friends", according to Seagal, and in 1990, they formed Seagal/Nasso Productions together, which handled distribution and foreign rights sales of Seagal's films. The men were at one point next-door neighbors on Staten Island in New York. Nasso served as associate producer of Marked for Death (1990) and executive producer of Out for Justice (1991). In 1992, Seagal/Nasso Productions signed a deal with Warner Bros. for four films — On Deadly Ground (1994), Under Siege 2: Dark Territory (1995), The Glimmer Man (1996) and Fire Down Below (1997), all of which Nasso produced or co-produced.

=== Seagal lawsuit ===
In 1997, Nasso and Seagal signed a deal to produce four more films. Warner Bros. later terminated its exclusive relationship with Seagal, however, and Nasso and Seagal decided to instead develop and produce television and film productions. Seagal/Nasso Productions subsequently pre-sold foreign rights to four films in which Seagal was scheduled to star — Blood on the Moon, Genghis Khan, Smash and Grab and Prince of Central Park.

The business partnership between Nasso and his longtime collaborator Seagal ended after their relationship became strained. According to Nasso, Seagal withdrew from the four-film deal on the advice of a Buddhist spiritual adviser. Seagal claimed, however, that Nasso became "depressed and erratic and abusive" after going through a divorce in the mid-1990s, making their relationship difficult. A spokesman for Seagal said that "Seagal lost millions of dollars working with Julius Nasso, it was no longer financially prudent to continue in the business, and Steven stopped working with Julius Nasso". In October 2000, Seagal closed the offices of Seagal/Nasso Productions in California.

Believing that Seagal owed him $3 million in compensation for backing out of the four-film deal, Nasso enlisted members of the Gambino crime family to threaten Seagal in an attempt to recoup money Nasso allegedly lost. Gambino family captain Anthony "Sonny" Ciccone first visited Seagal in Toronto during the filming of Exit Wounds in October 2000. In January 2001, Primo Cassarino and other mobsters picked up Seagal by car to bring him to a meeting with Ciccone at a Brooklyn restaurant. At the meeting, Ciccone bluntly told Seagal that he had a choice of making four promised movies with Nasso or paying Nasso a penalty of $150,000 per movie. If Seagal refused, Ciccone would kill him. Seagal, who later claimed that he brought a handgun to the meeting, was able to stall Ciccone and escape the meeting unharmed. Ciccone and Cassarino again visited Seagal at his home in Los Angeles the following month. In the spring of 2001, Seagal sought out another mobster, Genovese crime family captain Angelo "The Horn" Prisco, to act as a "peacemaker" in the dispute. He visited Prisco in prison at Rahway, New Jersey, and paid Prisco's lawyer $10,000 as "a favor for a favor".

In March 2002, Nasso filed a lawsuit in Richmond County Supreme Court, suing Seagal for $60 million. According to the suit, Nasso and his company had suffered substantial financial losses as a result of Seagal breaching a contract to star in four agreed-upon motion pictures. Seagal denied that he had ever entered into a contract with Nasso. On June 4, 2002, Nasso and his brother, Vincent Nasso, were among seventeen members and associates of the Gambino crime family named in a 68-count federal indictment. Nasso was arrested by the FBI at his Staten Island home and charged with two counts of conspiracy to commit extortion. The charges against the Nasso brothers stemmed from a wider investigation into Gambino family boss Peter Gotti and other senior mobsters. An attorney for Seagal, Martin Pollner, denied claims by Nasso's legal team that Seagal had initiated the FBI investigation.

On March 17, 2003, Ciccone, Cassarino and others were convicted of extortion and various other counts under the RICO Act. Seagal testified for the prosecution about the mobsters' extortion attempt. During the trial, Nasso was described by federal prosecutors as a Gambino associate. Nasso pleaded guilty on August 13, 2003, to the charge of extortion conspiracy. In court, he insisted that his civil suit against Seagal would proceed. When later asked if he regretted any of his actions, Nasso replied: "Not at all". On February 17, 2004, he was sentenced to a year and a day in prison, fined $75,000 and ordered to take mental health counseling on release from jail. During the sentencing hearing, the judge questioned the government's decision to label Nasso a Mafia associate, instead describing his conduct as "aberrant" behavior from an otherwise law-abiding man. After serving ten months of his sentence, Nasso was released from the Federal Correctional Institution, Elkton, Ohio, on June 28, 2005.

After a six-year legal battle, Nasso reached an out-of-court settlement with Seagal on January 6, 2008, with Seagal reportedly paying $500,000 in exchange for Nasso agreeing to drop the $60 million lawsuit for alleged breach of contract. Nasso commented: "I’m glad it’s behind us. I wish him the best".

=== Julius R. Nasso Productions ===
He founded Julius R. Nasso Productions and made movies including Prince of Central Park (2000) and One-Eyed King (2001).

=== Manhattan Pictures ===
Nasso co-founded Manhattan Pictures Intl., a Gotham-based motion picture distribution and production company, in his home city of New York, where he produced and released the films Enigma (2001) and In Praise of Love (2001).

=== Belafonte Arts and Media ===
Since 2006, Nasso has been Harry Belafonte's producer and contributed to a variety of works, including Sing Your Song (2011). He has been involved with Harry Bellefonte's final documentary, Following Harry along with Frankie Nasso and Susanne Rostock as producers. While in Manhattan, Nasso co-founded and served as CO-CEO of Belafonte Arts and Media.

Nasso's most recent protégé, Tony Schiena, whom he met in London in 1998, costarred in Nasso's directorial debut Darc (2018).

== Awards and achievements ==
For his contributions to culture in the borough, including creating the Staten Island Film Festival, Nasso received the Harbor Lights "Culture Award." He was also awarded the term as Board President for over five years of service to Harbor Lights. He also received the 2012 NAACP Image Award for Outstanding Documentary.

== Personal life ==
Nasso has a daughter with his current wife and two sons from a previous marriage. He lives in the Staten Island borough of New York.

On March 14, 2017, Nasso made headlines when two ponies belonging to him escaped from their barn during a snowstorm on Staten Island. The ponies, Blondie and Jewels, were quickly captured and returned to Nasso with the help of an off-duty police officer. Nasso has also been the former four-year chairman of The Harbour Lights Theater Group.

== Filmography ==
- Hard to Kill - Producer
- Marked for Death (1990) - Associate Producer
- Out for Justice (1991) - Executive Producer
- Under Siege (1992)
- On Deadly Ground (1994) - Producer
- Under Siege 2: Dark Territory (1995) - Co-Producer
- The Glimmer Man (1996) - Producer
- Fire Down Below (1997) - Producer
- Not Even the Trees (1998) - Producer
- The Patriot (1998) - Producer
- Prince of Central Park (2000) - Producer
- One Eyed King (2001) - Producer
- Narc (2002) - Producer
- In Enemy Hands (2004) - Producer
- The Poet (2007) - Executive Producer
- Trophy Wife (2010) - Producer
- Sing Your Song (2011) - Producer
- Squatters (2013) - Producer
- Nailed (2013) - Executive Producer
- Split Decision (2013) - Executive Producer
- Pride of Lions (2013) - Executive Producer
- Getaway (2013) - Executive Producer
- The Legend of William Tell: 3D (2014) - Producer
- Darc (2019) - Producer and Director
- The Pendragon Cycle: Rise of the Merlin (2026) - Producer
