= Wake of Death =

- Official DVD cover
- Directed by: Philippe Martínez
- Written by: Philippe Martínez; Mick Davis; Laurent Fellous; Kristina Hamilton-Grobler
- Produced by: Alan Latham; Philippe Martínez; Stéphanie Martínez; Stanley Roup
- Starring: Jean-Claude Van Damme; Simon Yam; Lisa King; Valerie Tian; Tony Schiena
- Cinematography: Emmanuel Kadosh; Michael Swan
- Edited by: Christopher Robin Bell; Dedan Ouziel
- Music by: Guy Farley
- Distributed by: Bauer-Martínez Studios; UKFS; Frame Werk Produktion GmbH & Co. KG
- Release dates: December 18, 2004 (US); January 19, 2005 (France)
- Running time: 86 minutes
- Country: United States
- Language: English
- Budget: $14 million

Wake of Death is a 2004 American action film directed by Philippe Martínez and starring Jean-Claude Van Damme. Ringo Lam was the original director, but he left the project after a few weeks of filming in Canada. After that, Lam was replaced by Cess Silvera who was fired after two weeks of filming in Cape Town, South Africa. The film was released to some countries' cinemas but direct to DVD in most places.

== Plot ==
After years as a mob enforcer, Ben Archer (Jean-Claude Van Damme) moves from Marseille to Los Angeles and decides to become legitimate so he can spend more time with his wife Cynthia (Lisa King) and son Nicholas (Pierre Marais).

Cynthia is a social worker with the INS, helping to process illegal Chinese immigrants. When a ship full of immigrants from Hong Kong is intercepted, she discovers a young girl named Kim (Valerie Tian) among them and decides, against regulations, to bring her home. She convinces a judge and INS agent Mac Hoggins (Danny Keogh) that the girl will be in grave danger if deported and asks for a week to make her case for asylum.

Kim's father, Sun Quan (Simon Yam), is a Chinese Triad boss who Kim saw murder her mother when she tried to leave him. Having tracked his daughter to Los Angeles, Sun Quan learns her exact whereabouts from Hoggins, who is corrupt, and he and his Triad henchmen kill Cynthia, her parents and many of the workers at the restaurant where they were dining. Nicholas and Kim flee amid the chaos. Ben, arriving late, engages in a shootout with the fleeing Triad members but is unable to stop them escaping before finding his wife's body. After a period of intense grief, he resolves to rescue the children and avenge Cynthia's death.

Ben enlists the help of Cynthia's uncle, Max (Anthony Fridjohn), a French mobster, along with Max's bodyguard Raymond (Claude Hernández) and friend Tony (Tony Schiena). Nicholas and Kim are found and kept hidden at Max's house. Ben decides to target Andy Wang (Tom Wu), one of the Triad members he saw fleeing the restaurant, having learned his name from police mugshots. Tony knows that Wang likes to frequent a brothel; Ben and Tony storm the brothel and kill Wang, along with several other Triad members.

Da Costa (Warrick Grier), the homicide detective assigned to both Cynthia and Wang's murders, is surprised to see Hoggins at the second crime scene for no apparent reason. During an informal visit to Max's house the next morning, he makes a point of mentioning this. Ben and Tony kidnap Hoggins - not realizing the Triads are watching - and take him to Max's house, where they brutally torture him for answers. Ben gets a call from Da Costa, who is at the morgue with some of the immigrants who died on the ship; an autopsy has revealed they were being used as drug mules. After Ben leaves, Max and Raymond force Hoggins to confess to his involvement with Sun Quan's heroin smuggling operation, as well as the boat he'll be on that night. Out of vengeance for Cynthia, they torture him to death.

Ben arrives at the morgue to discover that Da Costa and the attendants have been killed, and the heroin stolen, by two Triad members on motorbikes. He chases them down and kills them. Returning to Max's house, he and Tony see Triad vehicles speeding away, with Kim and Nicholas inside. Tony rushes into the house while Ben gives chase. Ben is able to rescue Kim, but the Triads escape with Nicholas. They return to the house, where Tony tells Ben that Max and Raymond have been killed.

Knowing Sun Quan will be at the docks that night, Ben and Tony storm his ship and kill all the Triad members on board. Sun Quan appears with Nicholas as a hostage; after a standoff, he and Ben shoot each other. Ben is severely wounded, while Sun Quan dies. Ben embraces Nicholas as the police arrive.

== Cast ==
- Jean-Claude Van Damme as Ben Archer
- Simon Yam as Sun Quan, Head of The Chinese Triad
- Philip Tan as Han, Quan's Second-In-Command
- Pierre Marais as Nicholas Archer
- Valerie Tian as Kim
- Tony Schiena as Tony
- Anthony Fridjhon as Max
- Claude Hernández as Raymond
- Lisa King as Cynthia Archer
- Tom Wu as Andy Wang, Head of The American Triad
- Danny Keough as Mac Hoggins, Corrupt Customs Official
- Warrick Grier as Detective Da Costa
- Jaqueline Chan as Mama Li
- Burt Kwouk as Tommy Li
- Joon Chong as Kim's Mother
- Andre Jacobs as Dr. Walker
- Bo Peterson as Judge Brown
- Stephen A. Chang as Father Lee
- Quentin Chong as Toby #1
- Winston Chong as Toby #2
- Arnold Chon as Biker Thug
- Lee-Anne Liebenberg as Girl On Ladder
