= Citizen Verdict =

- UK theatrical release poster
- Directed by: Philippe Martinez
- Screenplay by: Tony Clarke; Kristina Hamilton; Philippe Martinez; Frank Rehwaldt
- Produced by: Helmut Breuer; Philippe Martinez
- Starring: Armand Assante; Jerry Springer; Roy Scheider
- Cinematography: Michael Brierley
- Edited by: Kristina Hamilton
- Music by: Guy Farley
- Production company: Lucky 7 Productions LLC
- Distributed by: Bauer Martinez Studios
- Release date: May 20, 2003 (Cannes)
- Running time: 97 minutes
- Countries: United Kingdom; Germany
- Language: English

Citizen Verdict is a 2003 drama film directed by Philippe Martinez and starring Armand Assante, Jerry Springer and Roy Scheider.

== Cast ==
- Armand Assante as Sam Patterson
- Jerry Springer as Marty Rockman
- Roy Scheider as Governor Bull Tyler
- Raffaello Degruttola as Ricky Carr
- Dorette Potgieter as Carlene Osway
- Justine Mitchell as Jessica Landers
- Gideon Emery as Larry Grimes
- Adrian Galley as William Doby
- Langley Kirkwood as Vince Turner
- Brendan Pollecutt as Bob White

== Reception ==
The film has a 20% rating on Rotten Tomatoes. Jamie Russell of the BBC awarded the film two stars out of five. Steve Persall of the Tampa Bay Times graded the film a C−.
