= The Weapon (2023 film) =

- Directed by: Tony Schiena
- Starring: Tony Schiena; AnnaLynne McCord; Sean Patrick Flanery; Jack Kesy; Cuba Gooding Jr. Bruce Dern
- Distributed by: Lionsgate
- Release date: February 17, 2023
- Running time: 85 minutes
- Country: United States
- Language: English

The Weapon is a 2023 American action thriller film directed by Tony Schiena, and starring Schiena, AnnaLynne McCord, Sean Patrick Flanery, Jack Kesy, Cuba Gooding Jr. and Bruce Dern.

== Cast ==
- Tony Schiena as Dallas Ultio
- AnnaLynne McCord as Iris
- Sean Patrick Flanery as U.S. Marshal Antano
- Jack Kesy as Vinny
- Cuba Gooding Jr. as "Blue"
- Bruce Dern as Doris

== Release ==
The film was released in select theaters, on demand and digital platforms on February 17, 2023. It was released on DVD on March 28, 2023.

== Reception ==
Jeffrey Anderson of Common Sense Media awarded the film one star out of five.
