= Land of the Blind =

- Theatrical film poster
- Directed by: Robert Edwards
- Written by: Robert Edwards
- Produced by: Philippe Martinez; Jon Avnet; Alan Latham; Cerise Hallam Larkin; Stanley Roup
- Starring: Donald Sutherland; Ralph Fiennes; Tom Hollander; Marc Warren; Lara Flynn Boyle
- Cinematography: Emmanuel Kadosh
- Edited by: Ferne Pearlstein
- Music by: Guy Farley; Doug Edwards
- Production companies: Avnet-Kerner Productions; Bauer Martinez Studios; Brooklyn Films; Defender Film Fund II; Defender Production; Lucky 7 Productions LLC; Studio Eight Productions; Templar Films
- Distributed by: Bauer Martinez Entertainment
- Release date: June 16, 2006
- Running time: 101 minutes
- Countries: United Kingdom; United States
- Language: English
- Budget: $18 million (est)
- Box office: $15,180 (Worldwide)

Land of the Blind is a 2006 British-American political satire drama film starring Ralph Fiennes, Donald Sutherland, Tom Hollander and Lara Flynn Boyle.

Land of the Blind is a dark political satire, based on several incidents throughout history in which tyrannical rulers were overthrown by new leaders who proved to be just as bad, if not worse, and several such cases are alluded to. The title is taken from the saying, "In the land of the blind, the one-eyed man is king."

Land of the Blind had its world premiere in competition at the International Film Festival Rotterdam, and was the Opening Night Gala film at the 2006 Human Rights Watch Film Festival in London. Its U.S. premiere was in competition at the 2006 Tribeca Film Festival. It received negative reviews from critics, citing a poor scenario while praising Fiennes performance.

== Plot ==
An unnamed country is ruled by a petulant tyrant named Maximilian II (often called Junior) whose primary interests include selfish pleasure, micromanaging the country’s schlocky film industry, and enjoying sexual games with his beautiful, yet cruel, wife Josephine. His regime is barely tolerated due to the violence dealt by anti-government terrorists.

One such subversive revolutionary, a dissident philosopher and playwright named John Thorne, is held in a state prison, where he is guarded by a man named Joe. Joe comes to learn from Thorne and respect him for his bearing and intellect, if not his message. Junior, trying to quash spiraling dissent, takes the risk of letting Thorne out of jail, hoping to have him become not a great folk hero but another greedy, dishonest politician. Joe, too, is soon promoted to one of the guards at the palace and a position in the country's elite military unit, where he becomes so disgusted by the excesses of Junior and Josephine that he allows Thorne and his followers to enter the palace and kill them. Thorne becomes the new ruler, with an even more totalitarian regime. His government encourages separating children from their parents, imposes veganism, bans action movies, oppresses women, and eliminates imported medicine all while sending the country's professional classes to grim re-education camps.

For his assistance in assassinating the dictator, Joe is hailed as a hero by Thorne. Nevertheless, as Joe realizes that his one-time friend is just as bad as, if not worse than, his predecessor, he refuses to ally with the new regime. For this, Thorne sends Joe to a re-education camp. Subjected to numerous beatings and isolation, he continually refuses to sign his loyalty oath. His psyche begins to dramatically deteriorate as he is interrogated and tortured, seemingly discovering layers of bizarre hidden conspiracy within the camp and the broader regime of his former friend.

Thorne is killed in his bath by one of his once loyal followers. The revolutionary government is quickly overthrown. Junior's in-laws and nephew are revealed to have escaped during Thorne's revolution and, having lived in exile, have returned to re-establish the old government, and former collaborators and torturers return to civilian life. Joe’s legal case remains in limbo for having destroyed the old government, but also never having 'played ball' with the new one, so he remains in prison indefinitely. Twelve years later, he writes his memoirs while under house arrest, his sanity possibly still shattered.

== Cast ==
- Ralph Fiennes as Joe
- Donald Sutherland as John Thorne (later Chairman Thorne)
- Tom Hollander as President Maximilian II (a.k.a. "Junior")
- Lara Flynn Boyle as First Lady Josephine
- Marc Warren as Pool
- Ron Cook as Doc
- Robert Daws as Jones
- Laura Fraser as Madeleine
- Jonathan Hyde as Smith
- Camilla Rutherford as Tania
- Don Warrington as First Sergeant
- Miranda Raison as Daisy, Joe's Daughter
- Mackenzie Crook as Editor
- Michael Smiley as Thorne’s Lieutenant
- Nitin Ganatra as Prison Official
- Jodhi May as Joe’s Mother (uncredited)

== Historical references ==
Historical references in the film include Jean-Paul Marat (from the French Revolution), Kim Jong-Il, Joseph Stalin, Benito Mussolini, Augusto Pinochet, Anastasio Somoza Debayle, François Duvalier, Rudolf Hess, Jean-Claude Duvalier, Lyndon B. Johnson, Julius Caesar (from William Shakespeare's play), Robert Mugabe, Ngo Dinh Diem, Idi Amin, the PIRA Maze prison protests, U.S. POWs in Vietnam, the Weathermen terrorist group, the Khmer Rouge, the 1979 Revolution in Iran, and the subsequent Cultural Revolution in that country.

== Critical reception ==
The film received mostly negative reviews from critics. Review aggregator Rotten Tomatoes reports that 17% out of 18 professional film critics gave the film a positive review, with a rating average of 4.1/10.
