= Last Run =

2001 film by Anthony Hickox

- Film poster.
- Directed by: Anthony Hickox
- Written by: Anthony Hickox; Robert Syd Hopkins
- Produced by: Oliver G. Hess; Kevin M. Kallberg; Gábor Váradi
- Starring: Armand Assante; Jürgen Prochnow; Ornella Muti
- Cinematography: Michael G. Wojciechowski
- Edited by: Martin Brinkler
- Music by: Guy Farley
- Production companies: Promark Entertainment Group; Videal GmbH; Eurofilm Stúdió
- Distributed by: DEJ Productions (United States); Vantage Media (International)
- Release date: 2001
- Running time: 92 minutes
- Countries: United Kingdom; Germany
- Language: English

Last Run is a 2001 British-German action film, directed by Anthony Hickox, starring Armand Assante and Jürgen Prochnow.

== Cast ==
- Armand Assante as Frank Banner
- Jürgen Prochnow as Andrus Bukarin
- Ornella Muti as Danny
- Corey Johnson as Jon Neely
- Barna Illyés as Georgi Kaminski
- Anthony Hickox as Riley Chapin
- Annabel Brooks as Tina
- Viki Kiss as Kerlov
- Edit Illés as Kerlov
- Sándor Téri as Yuri
- Martin McDougall as Junior
- Niki Barabás as Number Two
- Norman Austin as Number One
- David Foxxe as Leo Schiff
- Ralph Brown as Simn
