= Viktor (2014 film) =

- Film poster
- Russian: Виктор
- Directed by: Philippe Martinez
- Written by: Philippe Martinez
- Produced by: Arnaud Frilley; Blanche Neumann; Alain Monne
- Starring: Gérard Depardieu; Elizabeth Hurley
- Cinematography: Jean-François Hensgens
- Edited by: Thomas Fernandez
- Music by: Frédéric Dunis; Arnaud Frilley
- Production companies: B-Tween; Baboushka Film; Kapara Pictures
- Distributed by: Inception Media Group; Saradan Media
- Release dates: 2 September 2014 (Moscow); 24 October 2014 (New York City)
- Running time: 134 minutes
- Countries: Russia; France
- Languages: English; Russian

Viktor (Russian: Виктор) is a 2014 crime thriller film written and directed by Philippe Martinez. Starring Gérard Depardieu and Elizabeth Hurley, the film premiered 2 September 2014 in Moscow and debuted in New York City on 24 October 2014. The project was filmed entirely in Russia and, being set in Moscow, it was filmed in locations in both Moscow and the Chechen capital of Grozny.

== Premise ==
Former gangster Victor Lambert is a professional thief specializing in the theft of works of art. After serving prison time in France for an art heist, he returns to his Russian home to investigate the circumstances surrounding the brutal murder of his son Jeremy three months earlier. He enlists the assistance of his former accomplice Alexandra Ivanov.

== Cast ==
- Gérard Depardieu as Victor Lambert
- Elizabeth Hurley as Alexandra Ivanov
- Eli Danker as Souliman
- Polina Kuzminskaya as Katerina
- Evgeniya Akhremenko as Inspector Plutova
- Igor Yatsko as Police Officer Vadim
- Frédéric Ducastel as shooter, bad guy
- Jean Baptiste Fillon as Jeremy
- Pavel Klimov as Egor
- Marika Gvilava as Tatiana
- Marcello Mazzarella as Claudio Martelli
- Denis Karasyov as Anton Belinskiy
- Kait Tenison as Herself
- Alexei Petrenko as Vetrov

== Production ==
London-based production company Saradan Media announced 15 May 2013, that Liz Hurley and Gérard Depardieu were about to begin filming an action film project in Russia under the working title of Turquoise and directed by Philippe Martinez. On 22 May Saradan Media revealed that "Tourquoise" and Viktor were the same project. Filming began in Grozny on Saturday 18 May 2013, with expectations that the film would be released in late 2013. The film actually released in Russia in September 2014.

== Critical response ==
On Rotten Tomatoes, the film holds an approval rating of 0% based on 7 reviews, with an average rating of 1.60/10. The film received a limited release in the United States where it was a commercial flop, with many US sources describing Depardieu's girth as making him unbelievable as an action hero. It was not released in France, where news of its dismal American box office performance were met by derision by the media.

The Detroit News wrote, "In his younger days, Depardieu had a burly charm, but the dude is 65 now and has to weigh 300 pounds. He looks ludicrous in action sequences". The Hollywood Reporter wrote, "Depardieu, age 65 and looking like he can barely move due to his massive girth..." continuing "the film is relentlessly tedious when it's not being laughable", sharing that the "latter aspect is exemplified by the supposed romantic relationship between the morbidly obese Depardieu and the gorgeous Hurley, whose adoring gazes toward her co-star demonstrate that her acting abilities have perhaps been underestimated". San Francisco Weekly wrote, "The 66-year-old Depardieu was no action hero even in his prime, and as his girth now rivals Paul Masson-era Orson Welles, we're meant to believe he strikes fear into his enemies". Film Journal International writes of the film's weak points, stating, "...sadly, the problem is Depardieu, who lumbers through the film looking as though he's tormented by indigestion rather than a lust for vengeance", and toward the film, "Viktor is surprisingly dull". They did, however, speak well toward the film's cinematography, expressing pleasure at the director's "delivering the genre staples – car chases, gun battles, a little torture (a reluctant informer), female flesh and endless dark alleys and mean streets – and Moscow is wall-to-wall with photo ops, from the winding Neva River to the Cathedral of St. Basil, which has made so many movie appearances it should be getting above-the-title billing". The Los Angeles Times wrote that seeing "the film's corpulent, 65-year-old star, Gérard Depardieu, play a brash killing machine who beds the likes of the gorgeous Elizabeth Hurley is truly like entering some cinematic Bizarro world. Think Charles Durning as Dirty Harry". The reviewer wrote the film was a "hackneyed jumble ... a fiery car chase, a couple of shootouts and an eyes-averting torture scene fill this competently shot movie's action quota. But a tone-switching epilogue proves hokey — and a little spooky". CBS News noted that while film was "beautifully shot" and director of photography Jean-Francois Hensgens brought out "the stunning Russian landscape", that artistic merit was "brought down by the clunky dialogue and the slow, plodding plot".
