= Darc (film) =

2018 American action thriller film

- Film poster
- Directed by: Julius R. Nasso
- Screenplay by: Tony Schiena
- Produced by: Jeff Kranzdorf; Lindsay Moffat; Julius R. Nasso
- Starring: Tony Schiena; Armand Assante; Sho Ikushima; Kippei Shiina; Tetsu Watanabe
- Cinematography: Joel Ransom
- Music by: Attilio Di Giovanni; Ilaria Della Bidia
- Release date: May 1, 2018
- Running time: 98 minutes
- Country: United States
- Languages: English; Japanese

Darc is a 2018 American action thriller film starring Tony Schiena, Armand Assante, Sho Ikushima, Kippei Shiina and Tetsu Watanabe.

== Plot ==
To bring down a global human trafficking ring, an Interpol agent recruits the help of a brutal criminal with inside knowledge of the yakuza.

== Cast ==
- Tony Schiena as Darc, the main protagonist of the movie, he is a brutal criminal with martial arts skills and an unquenchable thirst for revenge.
- Armand Assante as Lafique, an Interpol agent who seeks to take down a global human trafficking ring to save his own daughter.
- Sho Ikushima as Shigeru Kageyama (Nihongo: 影山茂, Kageyama Shigeru), a yakuza heir, son of Toshio Kageyama and grandson of Ginzo Kageyama, the powerful head (Oyabun/Kumicho) of Koda-kai. He is the one who hires Darc as his bodyguard after a confrontation with a rival gang.
- Kippei Shiina as Toshio Kageyama (Nihongo: 影山敏夫, Kageyama Toshio), the main antagonist of the movie, he is a Japanese businessman who is actually a high-ranking leader of the Koga-kai, a powerful yakuza syndicate and who is responsible for the murder of Darc's mother. He is also the son of Ginzo Kageyama and the father of Shigeru Kageyama.
- Tetsu Watanabe as Ginzo Kageyama (Nihongo: 影山銀蔵, Kageyama Ginzō), a powerful yakuza boss. He is the head of the Koga-kai, a powerful yakuza syndicate based in Japan and the US and has a bloody past involving the film's protagonist, Darc. He is also the father of Toshio Kageyama and grandfather of Shigeru Kageyama.

== Accolades ==
Year	Festival	Award	Recipient	Result	Ref.
2017	Leo Awards	Best Musical Score in a Motion Picture	Matthew Rogers	Nominated	
