= The Flock (film) =

2007 film by Andrew Lau

- Promotional movie poster
- Directed by: Andrew Lau
- Written by: Hans Bauer; Craig Mitchell
- Produced by: Philippe Martinez; Elie Samaha; Jenette Kahn; Adam Richman; Andrew Lau
- Starring: Richard Gere; Claire Danes; KaDee Strickland; Avril Lavigne
- Cinematography: Enrique Chediak
- Edited by: Martin Hunter
- Music by: Guy Farley
- Distributed by: The Weinstein Company
- Release date: 22 November 2007
- Running time: 105 minutes
- Country: United States
- Language: English
- Budget: US$35 million
- Box office: $7.1 million

The Flock is a 2007 American thriller film directed by Andrew Lau, the co-director of the Infernal Affairs trilogy. The film, which marks his English-language debut, stars Richard Gere and Claire Danes.

== Plot ==
A hyper-vigilant agent of the Department of Public Safety Erroll Babbage checks on registered sex offenders. Burnt out after a long career, he has become frustrated with the system of sex offender monitoring. With little faith in humanity left, he takes on one last job to find a missing girl.

He is three weeks away from taking early retirement and his final job is to train his young female replacement Allison Lowry. After being left a newspaper with his characteristic headline circling, he is convinced the case of kidnapping is connected to a paroled sex offender he's monitoring and he takes it upon himself to find the victim at all costs.

Errol is eventually forced to leave the department early due to his relentless interrogation of sexual offenders and occasional vigilante actions against them. His efforts center on Viola, a woman who has a history of being abused but is known to have a connection to another culprit that Errol suspects to have taken the girl. Together with his partner they figure out that Viola has become an abuser herself and is the ringleader in a kidnapping and torture syndicate. They track her down to a deserted scrap heap where they find the latest kidnapped girl as well as corpses of previous victims. The movie ends with Viola being brought to book after Errol considers killing her. Errol and Allison realize that in fighting the monsters involved in sexual offenses, they must not become monsters themselves.

== Cast ==
- Richard Gere as Agent Errol Babbage
- Claire Danes as Allison Lowry
- Avril Lavigne as Beatrice Bell
- KaDee Strickland as Viola
- Paul McGowen as Det. Grant P. Stockdale
- Matt Schulze as Custis
- Carmen Serano as Colette
- Kristina Sisco as Harriet Wells
- Ray Wise as Robert Still
- French Stewart as Haynes Ownsby
- Russell Sams as Edmund Grooms

== Production ==
In August 2005, it was announced Richard Gere would star in The Flock, the English-language debut of Andrew Lau with producer Philippe Martinez fully financing the film's entire $35 million budget. After production had wrapped, The Flock had its release held up due to disagreements over the final cut.

== Release ==
The film was released theatrically in several countries throughout the world in late 2007 and early 2008. In the United States, it premiered April 11, 2008, at the Palm Beach International Film Festival, before being released on DVD on May 20, 2008, by Genius Products.
