= Chuck Versus the Three Words =

- Chuck episode
- Episode no.: Season 3 Episode 2
- Directed by: Peter Lauer
- Written by: Allison Adler; Scott Rosenbaum
- Production code: 3X5802
- Original air date: January 10, 2010

Guest appearances
- Mini Andén as Carina Miller; Bonita Friedericy as Diane Beckman; Vinnie Jones as Karl Stromberg

Episode chronology
← Previous "Chuck Versus the Pink Slip"	Next → "Chuck Versus the Angel de la Muerte"

"Chuck Versus the Three Words" is the second episode of the third season of the American action comedy TV series Chuck. It was aired January 10, 2010, on NBC.

In the episode, Carina returns with a new mission for Team Bartowski – steal back a stolen weapon from her "fiancé", an arms dealer named Karl Stromberg. Meanwhile, Morgan plans to "win" her back, with the unlikely help of Jeff and Lester.

== Plot summary ==
=== Main Plot ===
As the episode opens a man is running through the jungle, clutching a briefcase. Before he can escape he is caught by a massive, scarred man who shoots him and reclaims the case. The man's phone rings and he answers it, saying goodbye with the words "I love you, Smooshie." His men begin to laugh but are cut off by a glare, before he shoots his victim again in the head.

Back in California, Sarah is drinking at a club with her DEA friend Carina. Carina begins to needle Sarah about Chuck, and as they talk, she realizes that Sarah has truly fallen in love with him, violating the "cardinal rule" of spying, although Sarah attempts to deny it. While Sarah and Carina are out, Chuck and Morgan are sitting around their largely unfurnished apartment playing video games. In an effort to cheer Chuck up, Morgan takes him out on the town but by chance they end up at the same club as Sarah and Carina. After being pressured into talking to Carina by Morgan, Chuck is spotted by Sarah and he comes over to join the two women. While Chuck greets Carina the massive man from the opening arrives, whom she identifies as her fiancé, Karl Stromberg. Chuck takes Carina at her word, and he flashes on one of the man's scars, identifying him as an arms dealer and tries to warn her. Instead, Carina brushes off his concern by telling him she knows and reveals that Stromberg is the team's next mission.

The team is briefed in Castle by Beckman. Stromberg has been wired a sizable amount of money for the weapon he's carrying, and Carina has pretended to fall in love with him to get close. They are to retrieve the weapon during the "couple's" engagement party. Chuck and Sarah are to go under their old cover relationship, while Casey attends as Carina's uncle (after objecting to being too young to play Carina's father). At the party the next day, Chuck tries to talk with Sarah about what happened in Prague while waiting for their chance to move on Stromberg's vault, but she coldly rebuffs him. Carina sees this and angrily tells Chuck to get it together, and that Sarah has been so cold because she loves him. When Stromberg begins his toast, Chuck and Sarah leave the party and make their way to the vault, but Chuck keeps trying to talk to Sarah, forcing Casey to take over and extend the toast to buy more time. As they get to the vault, she agrees to listen once they've completed their mission. Sarah opens the vault, and reveals it is protected by moving security lasers. Chuck begins to panic but she calms him down, allowing him to flash on the gymnastics skills to allow him to circumvent the lasers and reach the briefcase. Sarah is impressed as he retrieves the weapon and makes it out, only to accidentally trigger the alarm when he reaches her again and tells her it's time to talk. The vault door shuts and toxic gas begins to pump into the chamber.

While two of Stromberg's goons are dispatched to investigate, Sarah attempts to pick the lock but instead breaks into a vent to shut off the gas before Chuck can suffocate. While waiting, Chuck tries to talk to her through the door, unaware that Sarah is no longer there or able to hear him. Instead the goons arrive and snicker as he airs out his feelings for her. Sarah ambushes the guards from the ventilation shaft and opens the door only for Chuck to collapse into her arms with the words "I love you." Sarah and Carina are debriefed by Beckman on the weapon while Chuck is undergoing treatment for gas exposure. Sarah asks the General for a reassignment, citing Chuck's feelings for her will be a liability, but Beckman denies the request and orders her to continue training Chuck.

Sarah angrily begins pushing Chuck with staff fighting techniques and tries to force him to flash. They begin to argue and Chuck refuses to use the Intersect because he's afraid of hurting her. Fed up, Sarah knocks him down with her staff and stands over him, telling him he can't hurt her. Meanwhile, Carina is getting into her car at the Buy More when she spots Stromberg arriving. She flees into the store with the briefcase and gives it to Morgan with explicit instructions to turn it over to Chuck. He agrees after she accepts an invitation to his housewarming party (see below). Before Carina can escape she is captured by Stromberg, who plays a security recording of Chuck locked in the vault, who accidentally blew Carina's cover when he tried to talk to Sarah. Stromberg takes her to Chuck's apartment to find him and the weapon.

Later the team discovers Carina is missing and meets to discuss the situation at Casey's apartment while Morgan's party rages in the background. Stromberg and his goons arrive with Carina and force their way into Chuck's apartment, where Morgan unknowingly returns the weapon after calling Chuck to tell him Carina came to the party. While Casey evacuates the apartment by spraying the party-goers with his garden hose in the guise of an "angry neighbor," Chuck and Sarah prepare to incapacitate the guards with firearms and a tiki lantern. However a Mexican standoff ensues between the two parties. Chuck persuades his team to break the standoff by setting aside their weapons, then throws the lantern into the complex's fountain, which is filled with Jeff's highly-flammable "Jail Juice". In the chaos, Casey and Sarah incapacitate Stromberg's men, but Stromberg still has Carina and the case. Chuck then begins to reason with him, drawing on his own issues with Sarah to reveal he understands how deeply Stromberg was hurt. Carina plays along and tells him that while it began as an assignment, she genuinely came to love him. Stromberg lets his guard down and Carina quickly disables him.

Back at Casey's apartment Chuck is eyeing the case, but is interrupted by Beckman before he can open it. Chuck offers to try flashing on it but Beckman turns him down, and shuts off the communications. In Beckman's office she begs the man she's speaking with to allow her to fill the team in on the full situation due to the danger involved. She identifies him only as Shaw, and he leaves without an answer.

=== Morgan ===
While partying at the club with Chuck, Morgan repeatedly fails to hook up with any of the women there, or even get close to the bar. The next day at work he mentions to Jeff and Lester how his "girlfriend" Carina is back in town, but neither are very convinced Carina would have anything to do with him. The three concoct a plan for him to get together with her by throwing a housewarming party for himself and Chuck at their apartment, and invite their coworkers. Later, as he helps Chuck get ready for Carina's engagement party, he tricks Chuck into giving her an invitation to the party by hiding his keys.

Back at work, after Chuck fails to deliver the invitation and Jeff and Lester berate Morgan, he seeks advice from Big Mike, lamenting that Carina can't even remember his name. Big Mike advises him to not give up and keep after her. Carina enters the store with the case trying to flee Stromberg, and runs into Morgan. Addressing him as "Martin," she asks him to deliver the case to Chuck, to which he agrees provided she come to his party. She hastily accepts and flees again. That night, Morgan, Jeff and Lester's party is a great success. Carina arrives, but is in the company of Stromberg and his goons, which annoys Jeff and Lester. They muscle their way into Chuck's apartment to wait for him. Jeff and Lester conspire to get them wasted on Jeff's "Jail Juice," which he has been drinking for years, and challenge them to a drinking contest. Carina drugs the drinks prepared for Stromberg and his men, but he does not participate. When Lester takes one of the spiked drinks and passes out, Jeff remarks on his friend's low alcohol tolerance before drinking one of the drugged ones himself and collapses. Stromberg grows wise to Carina's attempts to drug him and is furious.

Morgan, after unwittingly alerting Chuck that Carina is at their apartment, decides to take it on himself to confront Carina over the way she has been treating him. He storms into the apartment and tells off both her and Stromberg (with Carina saving his life when Stromberg rises to deal with Morgan by reminding him he cannot deal with a body right now). She tells Morgan to leave, but he instead accuses her of treating him poorly because of her appearance. He orders her to leave his apartment and has one of the drugged cups of "Jail Juice". As he passes out Carina remarks how no one had ever refused her before.

The next morning after the party it is revealed that Carina thought Morgan standing up to her was sexy and slept with him. When he asks about his performance she remarks that while not the best, she hasn't had many better.

=== Chuck, Sarah and Carina ===
Throughout the episode Carina presses Sarah on her feelings for Chuck, very observantly recognizing that she has truly fallen in love with him. While the two prepare for the engagement party she spots the charm bracelet Chuck gave her among her jewelry and suggests she wear it as being something someone in love might do, but Sarah declines. Carina offers to talk about it but is again turned down. She finally suggests that she and Sarah take a vacation together after the mission is over, and Sarah says she'll think about it.

While cleaning up the remains of Morgan's party, Chuck and Sarah agree to try and work out their issues through a series of double entendres as they clean. Afterwards, Carina approaches Sarah at Castle about her offer of a vacation. Sarah thanks her, but declines. Carina says goodbye, but not before giving Sarah a memory stick and advising her to give it a look. After Carina leaves, Sarah plugs it into Castle's computer, and discovers it is the full recording of Chuck's confession while trapped in the vault. Her eyes fill with tears when she learns that the reason Chuck chose his spy training over her in Prague is because of the encouragement she herself gave him, the knowledge that he had the chance to do something good, and that he knew he had to make a sacrifice to protect everyone including his friends, family and Sarah. He chose to be a spy because he loves her.

== Production ==
On June 27, 2009, it was announced that actress and model Mini Anden would be returning to reprise her role of Carina. Anden had previously appeared in the role in the first-season episode "Chuck Versus the Wookiee". Casting for the role of Karl Stromberg was announced on August 6, 2009, and actor Vinnie Jones was announced in the role by September.

Although originally scheduled to premier in March, the episode was rescheduled instead into a two-hour premier along with "Chuck Versus the Pink Slip" on Sunday, January 10, 2010, with a third episode airing in the series' normal time slot the following evening.

=== Production Details ===
- The "cardinal rule of spying" of never falling in love was first referenced by Roan Montgomery in the Season Two episode, "Chuck Versus the Seduction".
- This episode is the first mention of the charm bracelet given to Sarah by Chuck since "Chuck Versus Santa Claus" and its first appearance since "Chuck Versus the Beefcake" where Sarah wears it to tell Chuck they can't break up and they have to move in together.
- Carina called Morgan by the same wrong name in her first appearance.
- Big Mike has been restored as store manager of the Buy More after being deposed in "Chuck Versus the First Kill".
- Daniel Shaw, who would be portrayed by actor Brandon Routh starting with "Chuck Versus Operation Awesome", makes his first appearance.

=== Flashes ===
- Chuck flashes on one of Stromberg's scars to identify him as an arms dealer.
- When Sarah and Chuck arrive at the vault, he flashes on advanced gymnastic skills to slip through the laser scanners.

== References to popular culture ==
- The name of the villain, Karl Stromberg, is shared by the villain in the film, The Spy Who Loved Me.
- During Stromberg's first toast, he mentions he hopes their "first child is a masculine child." This is a reference to The Godfather.
- Morgan describes Carina as "basically a Swedish supermodel". Actress Mini Anden who portrays Carina is a Swedish-born model in real life who hosted the Swedish section of Scandinavia's Top Model. When Carina and Sarah are parting ways, Carina says goodbye with "Jag kommer sakna dig, kompis" in Swedish, meaning "I will miss you, my friend". Sarah replies "Stęsknię się za tobą też" in Polish, which means "I'll miss you too".
- Chuck's gymnastic moves to avoid the laser beams and to get the weapon in the briefcase of the vault is an homage to Vincent Cassel's character in Ocean's Twelve, which itself references the film Entrapment.
- The pet name "Schmoopie" is a possible reference to the Seinfeld episode, The Soup Nazi.
