= General Commander =

- Theatrical pre-release poster
- Directed by: Ross W. Clarkson; Philippe Martinez
- Screenplay by: Lisa Gabriel; Philippe Martinez
- Produced by: Philippe Martinez
- Starring: Steven Seagal; Sonia Couling; Byron Gibson; Soraya Torrens; Mica Javier; Jai Day; Megan Brown Martinez; Evgeniya Akhremenko; Billy Ray Gallion; Edoardo Costa; Lou Veloso; Ruben Maria Soriquez; Ron Smoorenburg
- Cinematography: Ross W. Clarkson
- Edited by: Chris Bell; Jordan Dieselberg
- Music by: Bruno Brugnano
- Production companies: Saradan Media; SPI International
- Distributed by: Lionsgate
- Release date: May 28, 2019
- Running time: 85 minutes
- Country: United States
- Language: English
- Budget: $12,000,000
- Box office: $69,000

General Commander is a 2019 direct-to-video American action film produced by Philippe Martinez and directed by Martinez and Ross W. Clarkson. Set primarily in the Philippines, the film stars Steven Seagal and was released direct-to-DVD on May 28, 2019.

== Plot ==
A botched mission in Phnom Penh, Cambodia that results in a fatality leads to the disbanding of a CIA Global Response team led by Jake Alexander (Steven Seagal) and whose remaining members include Sonia Dekker (Sonia Couling), Tom Benton (Byron Gibson), Maria Lopez (Mica Javier), and Ben Harrison (Jai Day). Against CIA Agent Jessica Thompson's orders, the team continues their hunt for arms dealer Gino Orsetti (Edoardo Costa), with the financial assistance of Hong Kong-based magnate Katarina Sokolov (Evgeniya Akhremenko).

While in Bangkok, Tom secures a meeting with Orsetti by posing as an interested buyer in the organs he offers for sale. Meanwhile, CIA Agent Alec Hayes (Robert Rownd) unsuccessfully dispatches a hitman to assassinate Alexander and thus prevent his team from carrying on with their illegal mission. After their layover in Thailand, the team moves to Manila, where Sonia and Tom meet with Orsetti, while the rest stake out. Halfway into the sale, Sonia and Tom strike at Orsetti and a shootout ensues, followed by a car chase. Orsetti's car is overturned, and Tom shoots down a helicopter piloted by one of Orsetti's henchmen with RPG-7. Alexander kills a struggling Orsetti.

Two weeks later, after being questioned by Thompson on his role in Orsetti's death, Alexander resigns from the CIA and disappears. Alexander's team refuses to reveal his whereabouts; Hayes nonetheless locates him and subsequently orders a drone strike on Alexander, just as he is reunited with his lover in the Filipino countryside. His fate appears sealed by the ballistic detonation the missile deployed by the drone after locking on Alexander's target location.

== Cast ==
- Steven Seagal as CIA Agent Jake Alexander
- Sonia Couling as CIA Agent Sonia Dekker
- Byron Gibson as CIA Agent Tom Benton
- Soraya Torrens as CIA Agent Anna Rosen
- Mica Javier as CIA Agent Maria Lopez
- Jai Day as CIA Agent Ben Harrison
- Megan Brown Martinez as CIA Agent Thompson
- Evgeniya Akhremenko as Katarina Sokolov
- Billy Ray Gallion as Zach Stevens
- Edoardo Costa as Gino Orsetti
- Alicia Faubel as Alicia Disanto
- Valerio Zecchini as Vincenzo
- Remus Hususan as Tony
- Chris Pascone as Sal
- Lynden James Manning as Rocco

== Production ==
General Commander was originally envisaged and marketed as a television series following "a top-secret, rogue international paramilitary unit that fights major criminal organisations in a bid to stop World War III", based on a screenplay by Philipe Martinez and Bey Logan and produced by SPI International and Saradan Media. The series would have had nine episodes each with a runtime of 45 minutes. Principal photography began in December 2017 in Manila. While shooting scenes for General Commander, lead actor Steven Seagal also re-shot some scenes in Attrition that were set in the Philippines. Filming of General Commander took approximately nine months.

== Release ==
General Commander was released in Blu-ray and DVD on May 28, 2019.
