= Smile (2009 film) =

2009 film directed by Francesco Gasperoni

- Theatrical release poster
- Directed by: Francesco Gasperoni
- Screenplay by: Francesco Gasperoni
- Starring: Armand Assante; Harriet MacMasters-Green; Antonio Cupo
- Cinematography: Gianni Marras
- Edited by: Charles Kaplan; Francesco Loffredo
- Music by: Federico Landini
- Production company: Istituto Luce
- Distributed by: CineTel Films
- Release date: 2009
- Running time: 94 mins
- Country: Italy
- Language: English

Smile is a 2009 English language Italian horror/thriller film starring Armand Assante. It is the debut feature by Francesco Gasperoni.

A sequel was planned for release in late 2020 tentatively titled Smile II: Tollinger in the Mood.

== Plot ==
A group of college friends go on holiday to Morocco, and when one of them loses her camera she buys an instant camera from a mysterious man at a curio shop. However, the camera seems to be cursed, as everyone whose picture is taken with it ends up dying under mysterious circumstances. The remaining members must race to decipher the supernatural clues in the photos to save themselves.

== Cast ==
- Armand Assante as Edward "Eddie" Tollinger
- Harriet MacMasters-Green as Clarissa
- Antonio Cupo as Tommy
- Manuela Zanier as Angelica
- Mourad Zaoui as Rasheed
- Robert Capelli Jr. as Paul
- Giorgia Massetti as Jameela
- Tara Haggiag as Geneva
- Rabie Kati as Hunter
