= Red Coast =

- 3 Body Problem episode
- Episode no.: Season 1 Episode 2
- Directed by: Derek Tsang
- Written by: Rose Cartwright
- Cinematography by: Jonathan Freeman; Richard Donnelly
- Editing by: Katie Weiland
- Original air date: March 21, 2024
- Running time: 64 minutes

Guest appearances
- Ben Schnetzer as Young Mike Evans; Adrian Edmondson as Denys Porlock; Eve Ridley as Follower; Yu Guming as Yang Weining; Deng Qiaozhi as Lei Zhicheng; Lan Xiya as Tang Hongjing; Benjamin Jia as Lead Operator; Tom Wu as Count of the West; Russell Yuen as Emperor Zhou; John Dagleish as Felix; Lokky Lau as Engineer; Hon Ping Tang as Sentry I; Ali Noorani as Dr. Chowdhury; Kevin Eldon as Thomas More; Ami Tredea as Scientist; Shalini Peiris as Colleague; Rhys Bevan as Researcher; Carlotta Banat as Olivia; Kerena Jagpal as Eva

Episode chronology
← Previous "Countdown"	Next → "Destroyer of Worlds"

"Red Coast" is the second episode of the American science fiction television series 3 Body Problem, based on the Chinese novel series Remembrance of Earth's Past by Liu Cixin. The episode was written by Rose Cartwright, and directed by Derek Tsang. It was released on Netflix on March 21, 2024, alongside the rest of the season.

The series follows Ye Wenjie, an astrophysicist who sees her father beaten to death during a struggle session in the Chinese Cultural Revolution, who is conscripted by the military. Due to her scientific background, she is sent to a secret military base in a remote region. Her decision at the base to respond to contact from an alien civilization, telling it that humanity can no longer save itself and that she will help the aliens invade Earth, affects a group of scientists in the present day, forcing them to confront humanity's greatest threat. In the episode, the world starts theorizing over the sky phenomenon, while Ye Wenjie's connection to Mike Evans is explored.

The episode received positive reviews from critics, who praised the flashbacks and ending.

== Plot ==
=== 1968 ===
In Inner Mongolia, Ye Wenjie (Zine Tseng) continues working at the station. She eventually concludes that the sun can amplify the radio signals at a faster frequency. However, her superior shuts it down due to the symbolism of Mao Zedong being the "Red Sun" of China. Despite the threat, she decides to send the message to the universe.

=== 1977 ===
In Inner Mongolia, Ye Wenjie meets a young Mike Evans (Ben Schnetzer), a radical environmentalist, and later confronts her father's killer, who is unrepentant. Later, she realizes that her message has finally received an answer. However, the responder claims it is a pacifist and has intercepted her message; it warns her not to send another message, stating that the rest of its species will want to conquer Earth if made aware of it. She is disappointed, but then decides to send a message anyway, claiming that she will help them conquer Earth.

=== 2024 ===
In London, the citizens are debating over how the phenomenon happened. With the countdown nearing to just a few minutes, Auggie (Eiza González) goes to her laboratory and sees a successful demonstration of her nanofiber technology. However, she shocks her colleagues by using her position to shut down the project. This causes the countdown to finally disappear with just one minute left, but Auggie is now risking losing her job. Clarence (Benedict Wong) gets in touch with Auggie, asking for help in finding more about Evans (Jonathan Pryce).

Jin (Jess Hong) continues using the VR headset, where her choices can have effects on potential new eras for the virtual world. She shows it to Jack (John Bradley), but Jack continues being immediately beheaded as he was never invited. Later, he gets his own VR headset and is finally allowed to play. Using her abilities, Jin leads a progress that allows dead citizens to return to life. However, the citizens are suddenly killed in another mass extinction event, just as she begins to enter Level 2.

== Production ==
=== Development ===
The episode was written by Rose Cartwright, and directed by Derek Tsang. It marked Cartwright's first writing credit, and Tsang's second directing credit.

=== Writing ===
Regarding Ye Wenjie's decision to send the message, D. B. Weiss explained, "[We've seen] her disdain [for] authority because she saw where it leads; it led to her father being beaten to death in front of 50,000 people by schoolgirls with their belts. She chooses science and she chooses reality, and she chooses the hope that maybe somewhere else out there, there's somebody better than what the world has offered up to her thus far in her life."

== Release ==
The episode, along with the rest of the season, premiered on March 21, 2024, on Netflix. It was originally set to premiere in January 2024.

== Critical reception ==
"Red Coast" received positive reviews from critics. Ben Rosenstock of Vulture gave the episode a 3 star rating out of 5 and wrote, "The problem isn't individual sadists; it's something core to all of us: some willingness to choose selfishness and tell lies as readily as we believe them. From Wenjie's perspective, those essential impulses can't be overcome with protests or even a revolution; we require outside assistance. Throw the whole Earth away."

Johnny Loftus of Decider wrote, "Benioff, Weiss, and Woo have built a compelling core cast out of the motivations that previously drove one single character. Damn, it's almost like the Game of Thrones and True Blood veterans have done this whole TV thing at a high level before." Dan Selcke gave the episode an "A–" grade and wrote, "I can't get too mad at the show for trying too much. I'd rather a show overreach than underreach, and for the most part, 3 Body Problem's grasp matches its ambition."

Sean T. Collins of The New York Times wrote, "the horror trope of the final warning before the plunge is a nearly universal one, embodied by all the old men in slasher franchises who warn groups of oblivious teens not to travel to a masked killer's stalking grounds. Perhaps a slasher on galactic scale is firing up his chain saw with Earth as his destination even now." Billie Doux of Doux Reviews wrote, "I liked this one better than the first episode, and omg, the ending."

Jerrica Tisdale of Telltale TV wrote, "“Red Coast” gives us the most surprising development with Ye Wenjie's choice and potential consequences." Greg Wheeler of Review Geek gave the episode a 4 star rating out of 5 and wrote, "there's enough to get sucked in to the plot and overlook this, and that ending with Ye Wenjie seems to hint that aliens are involved in all of this somehow. We'll have to wait and see for sure but episode 2 deepens the mystery in a really intriguing way."
