= Quinn Duffy =

American actor (born 1970)

Quinn Duffy (born January 1, 1970) is an American actor. He has had major roles in such films as The Chaos Experiment (a.k.a. The Steam Experiment), Game of Death, and Green Book, and has guest-starred in numerous television shows. He wrote, directed, and produced the 2005 short film The Ledge.

== Filmography ==
=== Film ===
Year	Title	Role	Notes
1995	In the Kingdom of the Blind, the Man with One Eye Is King	Micky	
1996	Playback	Robert Miller	
1996	The Nutty Professor	Bartender	
1997	The Corporate Ladder	Nico Santos	
2004	Dropped Frames	Ryan Everly	
2009	The Chaos Experiment	Frank	
2011	Game of Death	Redvale	
2018	Green Book	Mikey Cerrone	
TBA	Silent Partners	Steele	

=== Television ===
Year	Title	Role	Notes
1993	Renegade	Billy Pike	Episode: "Billy"
1994	Viper	Tim Rackham	Episode: "Once a Thief"
1994	Silk Stalkings	Sam Stoner	Episode: "Mother Love"
1995	Unhappily Ever After	Matt Cochran	Episode: "Don Juan De Van Nuys"
1997	JAG	Mark Harridan	Episode: "Heroes"
1997	The Last Don	Silvio Clericuzio	Episode: "Part I"
1998	Night Man	Louie Constantino	Episode: "Bad Moon Rising"
2001	Three Blind Mice	Ned Weaver	Television film
2001	Sheena	Nicodemus	Episode: "Rendezvous"
