= Portree High School =

State co-educational school in Scotland

Information
- School type: State school, state co-educational comprehensive
- Established: c. 1800-1825
- School board: Portree High Associated Schools Group
- Head teacher: Tony Breen
- Teaching staff: 43

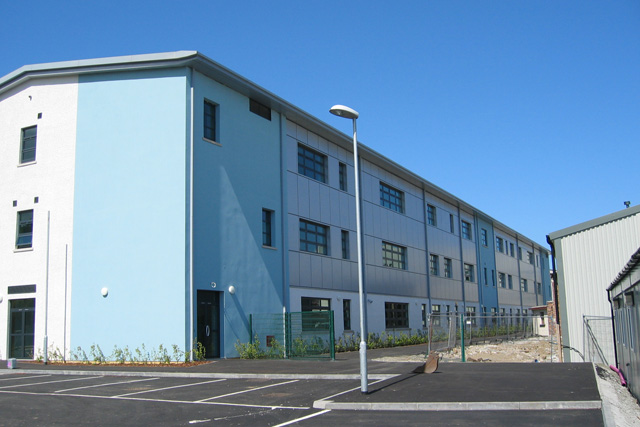
The new Portree High School A section of the new 13,000 square metre school buildings that were handed over by the construction company this week. The development cost £28m. It includes a library and a swimming pool, each of which will be for the use of the wider community as well as the school pupils. The new school will be in use from August 2008.

Portree High School (Gaelic: Àrd-sgoil Phort Rìgh) is a state co-educational comprehensive school in Portree, Isle of Skye in Scotland. As of 2025 the school enrols 503 pupils and employs 43 teaching members of staff. The school's catchment area draws from 11 primary schools across the islands of Skye and Raasay. On site, there is The Elgin Residence, commonly known as The Elgin Hostel, a location for pupils whose homes are a greater distance away to stay. Since 2018, the Headteacher has been Tony Breen. The school has 11 departments, some with multiple subjects.

== History ==
A school has existed at Portree since the 17th century. However it closed in 1825 due to the difficulty in finding a new qualified schoolmaster. Construction on the Portree High School buildings began in 1872. In 1905 it became a Higher Grade school. Margaret Carnegie Hostel for girls being opened in 1924, followed in 1933 by the Elgin Hostel for boys. Elgin Hostel is now a Category B listed building.

Until late 2008, the school consisted of three buildings - the main building, the Elgin Hostel and the Technical Block, along with about a dozen demountable classrooms. In 2008, this arrangement was replaced by a new building, constructed by Morrison Construction as part of a regional PPP scheme to build eleven schools in the Highlands. The demountable classrooms were then removed, and the main building and Technical Block demolished.

== Curriculum ==
Students take a range of curricular subjects in the Broad General Education (S1-S3) and a wide range of subjects at N4/5, Higher and AH level. The school's curriculum includes provision for Gaelic medium education. The school works in partnership with the West Highland College and Sabhal Mor Ostaig to offer a wide range of vocational subjects and Foundation Apprenticeships. The new school was built in 2008, and officially opened in 2010. The current Head Teacher, Tony Breen, was appointed in 2021.

== Notable alumni ==
- Sir Russell Johnston (1932–2008), Liberal Democrat politician, Leader of the Scottish Liberal Party 1974–1988
- Hector MacKenzie, Baron MacKenzie of Culkein (born 1940), nurse and trades unionist
- Sorley Maclean, Scottish Gaelic poet and Nobel Prize nominee
- Roderick John MacLeod, Lord Minginish (born c. 1953), known as Roddy John, Chairman of the Scottish Land Court since 2014
- Eilidh Watt (1908 – 1996), Gaelic broadcaster, teacher, and writer
