= Belly of the Beast (2003 film) =

- DVD cover
- Directed by: Ching Siu-tung
- Written by: Thomas Fenton (uncredited); James Townsend
- Story by: Steven Seagal (uncredited)
- Produced by: Jamie Brown; Randall Emmett; George Furla; Gary Howsam; Steven Seagal; Charles Wang
- Starring: Steven Seagal; Byron Mann; Monica Lo; Tom Wu
- Cinematography: Danny Nowak
- Edited by: David Richardson
- Music by: Mark Sayer-Wade
- Production companies: GFT Entertainment; Salon Films; Studio Eight Productions; Emmett/Furla Films
- Distributed by: Columbia TriStar Home Entertainment
- Release date: December 30, 2003
- Running time: 91 minutes
- Country: United States
- Languages: English; Thai
- Budget: $14.3 million

Belly of the Beast is a 2003 American action film directed by Hong Kong film director Ching Siu-tung in his American directorial debut, and starring Steven Seagal, who also produced. The film co-stars Byron Mann, Monica Lo and Tom Wu. Seagal plays Jake Hopper, a former CIA agent on a quest to find his kidnapped daughter. The film was released on direct-to-DVD in the United States on December 30, 2003; the film recouped its budget from the US home video market alone.

== Plot ==
Ten years ago, CIA agent Jake Hopper was stationed in Thailand. A fight with thugs resulted in his partner, Sunti escaping with his life after accidentally killing a woman. Following that, Jake left the CIA and returned to the United States when his wife died, while Sunti became a Buddhist monk to atone for his sins. Following his retirement, Jake becomes a successful businessman running a private security business while being a devoted father to his now-adult daughter Jessica.

While hiking in Thailand, Jessica and her friend Sara Winthorpe, the daughter of U.S. Senator John Winthorpe, are kidnapped. A group of Islamic fundamentalists known as the Abu Karaf claims responsibility. The Abu Karaf demand the release of 20 prisoners from American custody. Tom Collins, an ex-colleague of Jake's, recognizes Jessica on the ransom tape, and he tips Jake off. Knowing that Jake must rescue the girls himself, a former CIA colleague puts him in contact with Leon Washington, an active CIA agent who is working in Thailand. Jake goes to Bangkok, and he escapes an assassination attempt by gangsters and unknown forces.

Meanwhile, Leon arranges a meeting for himself with Soku, the internal security chief for General Jantapan, a rebel military general who is making a play to be one of the most powerful men in Thailand. Secretly, Jantapan is messing with some very dangerous spiritual forces. Soku provides Jake with a cover story, but the CIA wants Jake out of the way because they are planning to take out the Abu Karaf with the aid of the Thai army, and they do not want a civilian in the middle. As a spiritual man, Jake contacts his spiritual master, Buddhist monk Paijan Paitoon. As Jake descends into trouble, Paitoon offers to arrange a divination from the oracle of the order. After enlisting the help of Sunti, Jake gets Lulu, the girlfriend of arms dealer Fitch McQuoid, to steal information leading to the Abu Karaf.

Jake and Sunti follow the leads to a warehouse where they discover evidence of highly sophisticated weaponry. With their enemies now after Lulu, Jake takes Lulu under his wing. He then shares some of his info with Leon still testing the waters. Another attempt is made on Jake's life, and this time, Jake's sure that Leon was involved.

Finally, the Abu Karaf contact Jake to arrange a meeting to see the pieces are coming together. Jake figures out that it was not the Abu Karaf who kidnapped Jessica and Sarah. Jake gets his reading from the old oracle, and the cryptic message confirms that his fears, demonic spiritual forces, are working against him. Jantapan later goes to an evil temple and tries to send the spirit of an ancient warrior demon to kill Jake, but the ceremony goes wrong and the spirit enters Jantapan himself, giving him evil physical and spiritual powers, disguised as feats.

Jake and Sunti go to meet Mongkol, the leader of the Abu Karaf. Mongkol confirms what Jake suspects; ever since the terrorist attacks of 2001, Jantapan has worked to corner the narcotics and arms markets. He also adds that Jantapan kidnapped the girls and blamed the Abu Karaf so the army would wipe out Jantapan's competition. Mongkol, knowing where the girls are, gives Jake plans and intelligence, as they both need the girls alive. Jake must engage in a rescue effort that will put him to the ultimate test as he takes on Jantapan in a battle in which death may be the only ending.

Later that night, Jake and Sunti plan to rescue the girls, who are locked in a cell in Jantapan's mansion. After killing two gang members guarding the cell and freeing the girls, a group of corrupt Thai policemen intervene and make a deadly shootout but end up dead through the firearms of the two. Meanwhile, Sunti kills the rest of the cops while Jake battles with Jantapan in the upstairs living room. Jake kills Jantapan by disarming him and breaking his neck. He returns downstairs which is now full of dead bodies of Thai police and embraces the girls and then Sunti only to discover he is fatally injured. Sunti wishes Jake farewell before dying in his arms. Military forces led by Leon and their General enter, but Leon orders them to hold fire after seeing Jake with the dead Sunti and the kidnapped girls.

After the battle, a Buddhist funeral with Jake in the lead is seen. Jake steps into the river and throws Sunti's ashes in the water. A vision of Sunti smiling fades in and later fades out. Jake was looking at the river and saying "Goodbye, brother."

== Cast ==
- Steven Seagal as CIA Agent Jake Hopper
- Byron Mann as Sunti
- Monica Lo as Lulu
- Tom Wu as General Jantapan
- Sara Malakul Lane as Jessica Hopper
- Patrick Robinson as CIA Agent Leon Washington
- Vincent Riotta as Fitch McQuoid
- Norman Veeratum as Captain Suthep
- Eilidh MacQueen as Sara Winthorpe
- Chan Siu-tung as Kong
- Kevork Malikyan as Fernand Zadir
- Pongpat Wachirabunjong as Mongkol
- Alastair Vardy as Security Guard
- Andy Adam as Security Guard
- Shahkritt Yamnarm as Brice
- Max Ruddock as Russel
- Martin McDougall as Tom Collins
- Nicolas Rochette as Masked Man
- Ian Robison as Tom Blake
- Colin Stinton as Jim Cox
- Akaluk Oisingo as Taxi Driver
- Wannakit Siriput as Tommy Taipei
- Malin Moberg as Woman In Pool

== Production ==
Belly of the Beast is set and was filmed in Bangkok, Thailand, and was filmed over 42 days from February 3 to March 17, 2003.

The film ends with words saying "In Loving Memory of our friend Trevor Murray", who was the film's production designer. Murray died from natural causes in Bangkok during the last few days of filming.

== Reception ==
Scott Weinberg of eFilmCritic.com gives the film 1.5/5, saying "It's not just that Seagal makes awful movies; it's that he makes the exact same awful movies over and over." Empire gave the film 1/5, saying that even compared to other Seagal films "this one is especially woeful".

== Home media ==
The film was released in Region 1 DVD in the United States on December 30, 2003, and Region 2 in the United Kingdom on 16 February 2004 by Columbia TriStar Home Entertainment.
