= Quentin Chong =

South African martial arts trainer

Quentin "Dragon" Chong is a retired South African professional mixed martial artist, trainer/coach and actor who has appeared in a number of American movies, local TV series, advertisements and magazines.

== Background ==
Quentin Chong, nicknamed “the Dragon”, was born in 1972, in Gaborone, Botswana. He is the youngest of three siblings. He grew up in Cape Town, South Africa, where he still resides. As a child, aged 5, he trained in Chinese Kung Fu in Hong Kong. On a later visit to Thailand in the early 1990s he started training in Muaythai (also known as Muay Thai), a well-known combat sport of Thailand, under Manop Maswichean, who is a World Champion in the heavy weight category of this sport.

== Professional career ==
In 2001, he was challenged to a World Muaythai title fight in the super middle weight category, in Chumphon, Thailand, against Saroonsak. He won the World Champion Title and successfully defended it in 2002 in Cape Town, South Africa, against Nokweit Davies (Nokweed Devy), also a world champion in the super-middle weight category. He has won 18 of 19 professional fights. His fight in 2002, against Davies, was his last professional fight.

His current involvement in the sport is in capacity of president, coach and manager of the South African Amateur Muaythai Foundation. He currently serves on the Executive Board of the International Federation of Muaythai Amateur

== Other ==
Quentin has appeared in various international television series and films such as Wake of Death, Death Race 2 and Number One Girl (2005) and featured alongside actors such as Jean-Claude Van Damme, Pat Morita and Vinnie Jones. He had surgery to replace thinning hair after which he appeared in a number of South African newspapers, magazines, television adverts and shows such as Top Billing, the South African television series "Way of the Warrior" and the international television series "Strikeback" . He has trained other well-known international martial arts fighters such as Randy Courture and currently focuses on training fighters at his own gym called Dragon Power Muaythai, MMA and Fitness Centre, based in Cape Town.

His philanthropic efforts include involvement with the Amy Biehl Foundation Trust and also with his own registered non-profit organisation called the South African Muaythai Against Drugs Association, which involves martial arts training, African drumming and cultural dancing for children from disadvantaged backgrounds from the townships around Cape Town.
