= The Chaos Experiment =

- Directed by: Philippe Martinez
- Written by: Robert Malkani
- Produced by: Luc Campeau; Philippe Martinez
- Starring: Val Kilmer; Armand Assante; Eric Roberts; Patrick Muldoon
- Release dates: March 1, 2009 (Gasparilla International Film Festival); May 1, 2009
- Language: English
- Budget: $7,000,000

The Chaos Experiment (previously known as The Steam Experiment) is a 2009 independent suspense thriller directed by Philippe Martinez and starring Val Kilmer, Armand Assante, and Eric Roberts.

== Plot ==
A deranged man calling himself James Pettis approaches The Grand Rapids Press demanding that it publish his predictions about the upcoming demise of civilization due to the conditions of global warming, warning that he has trapped a group of six people in a Turkish-style steamroom to demonstrate the effects of this environment on humans. A local police detective Mancini tries to get Pettis to reveal information that will help him confirm the truth of his threat and to rescue the hostages, but over the course of the interrogation begins to suspect that either Pettis' story is a delusional hoax, or that the steamroom killing has already taken place.

As Pettis describes developments in the streamroom to Mancini, the scene is shown of three men and three women meeting in the steamroom of a luxury hotel as part of an online dating promotion, then being locked in together. When they discover that they have been locked in, they react badly: Frank becomes abusive to Jessie, and is killed in her defense by openly neurotic Margaret. Jessie is killed with a nail gun by an unseen assailant when she pokes her head through the small window in the steamroom door; Christopher is injured in the hand with a nail as the window is boarded over from outside. Margaret becomes agitated and commits suicide. Grant is bludgeoned by Catherine after he accuses her and Christopher of being allies of the perpetrators and repeatedly holds her head underwater.

Mancini's call to Pettis' psychiatrist finally brings staff from the local state psychiatric hospital, from which Pettis recently escaped. It is revealed that Christopher and Catherine are staff at this facility, and are unhappy with Pettis for going to the news media and police with this story.

== Cast ==
- Val Kilmer as James Pettis, the deranged scientist, a former university professor
- Armand Assante as Detective Mancini, who tries to negotiate with the scientist
- Eric Roberts as Grant, a hostage who is a former pro football player
- Patrick Muldoon as Christopher, a hostage who is a nurse
- Megan Brown as Catherine, a hostage who is a former actress
- Eve Mauro as Jessie, a hostage who is a waitress
- Quinn Duffy as Frank, a hostage who is a restaurateur
- Cordelia Reynolds as Margaret, a hostage who is a writer
- Julianne Howe-Bouwens as Officer Briggs, who assists Detective Mancini on the Pettis case

== Production ==
Taking advantage of economic incentives for filming in Michigan, the script was revised to set the story in Grand Rapids, Michigan. Filming took place over four weeks in September 2008, including scenes at the offices of The Grand Rapids Press, the Amway Grand Plaza Hotel, the Grand Rapids Public Museum, and other downtown locations. The budget for the film was $7 million. The shots of skyscrapers are of the Inner Harbor in Baltimore, Maryland.

== Reception ==
The film had a limited theatrical release, playing to small audiences on two screens for one week in Grand Rapids, and for one week in nearby Lansing.
