= One Eyed King =

2001 film by Robert Moresco

- DVD cover
- Directed by: Robert Moresco
- Written by: Robert Moresco
- Produced by: Carl Colpaert; Billy Dietrich; Christine Cavanaugh; Julius R. Nasso; Robert Moresco
- Starring: William Baldwin; Dash Mihok; Armand Assante; Chazz Palminteri
- Cinematography: François Dagenais
- Edited by: Robert A. Ferretti; Joseph Weadick
- Distributed by: Lions Gate Films
- Release date: February 1, 2001 (Limited)
- Running time: 105 minutes
- Country: United States
- Language: English

One Eyed King is an ensemble crime drama detailing the trials and tribulations of several characters living together in the same Hell's Kitchen neighborhood. Starring Armand Assante, William Baldwin, Jim Breuer, Bruno Kirby, Chazz Palminteri, and Jason Gedrick, the film had its premiere at the 2001 Boston Film Festival.

== Premise ==
Five childhood friends deal with their own hardships in Hell's Kitchen, Manhattan. Their livelihood is tied to a ruthless Irish mob boss. They all soon find themselves tested between their lifelong friendship to each other and their loyalty to a coldblooded killer.

== Cast ==
- William Baldwin as Frankie Thomas
  - Justin Bradley as Young Frankie Thomas
- Dash Mihok as "Bug"
  - Gary Fine as Young "Bug"
- Jason Gedrick as Dennis Reilly
  - Johnny Griffin as Young Dennis Reilly
- Jim Breuer as Patrick "Paddy" O'Donahue
  - Kevin Woodhouse as Young Patrick "Paddy" O'Donohue
- Josh Hopkins as Chuckie
  - Mitchell David Rothpan as Young Chuckie
- Chazz Palminteri as Detective Eddie Dugan
- Leo Rossi as Joe "Big Joe" Thomas
- Connie Britton as Helen Reilly
- Amanda Moresco as Kate Thomas
- Catherine Colvey as Marge Reilly
- Thomas Michael as Larry "The Lip"
- Lara Daans as "Cookie"
- Armand Assante as Hollis "Holly" Cone
- Rick Aiello as Terry / The Narrator
- Patrick McGuiness as Junior
- Michel Perron as Freddy "Fat Freddy"
- Bruno Kirby as Mickey
- John Dunn-Hill as "Pops" McCool
- Sheena Larkin as Annie "Blind Annie"
- Devin and Tara O’Donnell as young blonde kids of mobster
