= Chuck Versus the Angel de la Muerte =

- Chuck episode
- Episode no.: Season 3 Episode 3
- Directed by: Jeremiah S. Chechik
- Written by: Phil Klemmer
- Production code: 3X5803
- Original air date: January 11, 2010

Guest appearances
- Armand Assante as Premier Alejandro Goya; Andrew Connolly as Jack Artman; Bonita Friedericy as Diane Beckman; Eduardo Garcia as Head of security

Episode chronology
← Previous "Chuck Versus the Three Words"	Next → "Chuck Versus Operation Awesome"

"Chuck Versus the Angel de la Muerte" is the third episode of the third season of Chuck. It aired on NBC on January 11, 2010 as part of the season's three-part premier, following "Chuck Versus the Pink Slip" and "Chuck Versus the Three Words" on January 10. Devon Woodcomb gets a little more than he bargained for when he gets drawn into Chuck's latest assignment: protecting the leader of the Latin American nation of Costa Gravas.

== Plot summary ==
The episode begins with a flashback to UCLA medical school in 2000. As the professor calls on students to assist with an assignment, Devon and Ellie are absent from their first day of class, and making out in a closet having just met for the first time. In the present, they are busy unpacking from their move into their new apartment. As they pause to remember their wedding album, Devon promises Ellie a romantic evening but are soon distracted by the sound of a helicopter flying past. Devon slips out and meets Chuck as he arrives home from a mission and reminds him to come over and help Devon and Ellie set up the TV at their new apartment. Chuck gets things going without trouble, but while Ellie is getting her wedding DVD, he flashes on the news report that Premier Alejandro Goya, the dictator of Costa Gravas, has collapsed from a heart attack. Chuck is called away to Castle and Devon is paged to the ER, leaving Ellie alone.

At Castle, Beckman briefs Chuck, Sarah and Casey on their assignment. They are to safeguard Goya, who is undergoing treatment at Westside Medical Center. Casey objects to the order, as Beckman had personally ordered him to assassinate Goya three times, which Casey had failed to complete, however Goya has come to the US to announce he is opening his country up to free democratic elections and Beckman is adamant he survive. At the hospital, Devon arrives in the ER to find that his patient is the Premier. Both Chuck (by Beckman) and Devon (by Goya's chief bodyguard) are told that if anything happens to Goya they will be held responsible. Devon is successful and in a press conference announces the Premier's chances of returning to work are "muy awesome."

Chuck intercepts Devon on his way home and debriefs him. Devon confirms that Goya did not actually have a heart attack because his potassium levels were too high. As Chuck turns to leave, Devon, seeking the adrenaline rush he had playing football, offers his help for more spy work, but Chuck turns him down because Ellie would kill him. The team briefs Beckman at Casey's apartment, and she orders the team to infiltrate a gala event at the Costa Gravan embassy to safeguard the Premier. Because the embassy is considered Costa Gravan soil, the CIA disavows any knowledge of the mission and Casey tells the team he has to remove himself from the operation because of how many men he killed fighting Goya's revolution, the Costa Gravans call him "the Angel of Death" and he is a wanted man. Meanwhile, Goya himself arrives at the complex to visit Devon and thank him for saving his life by inviting he and Ellie (while heavily flirting with the latter) to the gala. Chuck takes advantage of the opportunity and steps in to meet the Premier and get himself and Sarah invited as well.

Chuck, Sarah, Ellie and Devon arrive at the gala, while Casey remains in the van. While Chuck and Sarah case the embassy for signs of the assassin, Devon asks Chuck what he gets to do. Chuck tells him to keep out of trouble. Goya begins flirting with Ellie and Sarah runs interference to get her away from Goya. Ellie and Devon each confront Sarah and Chuck, respectively, about their relationship. Although both try to stress that they are just friends now, neither Ellie or Devon are convinced. The conversation is interrupted by a speech by Goya, who asks Ellie for the evening's first dance. Casey runs the guest list against a list of known terrorists and comes up with a match on a man who served with a resistance cell against Goya. Chuck and Sarah spot him moving towards the Premier from the opposite side of the hall. To intercept him, Chuck flashes on how to dance, and works his way towards him with Sarah, knocking him out. However, he ends up just being part of a protest, and Chuck and Sarah are ejected from the embassy. As they're being removed, Chuck flashes on the real assassin and Casey enters disguised as a Costa Gravan soldier to take over. He spots the assassin moving towards the Premier, but as he moves to cut him off and reaches for his gun, Devon accidentally misidentifies Casey as the assailant and tackles him. Casey is arrested, although Devon's move forces the assassin to back off.

At Castle, Beckman refuses to authorize a rescue operation and instead orders the team to stand down for the diplomats. In the embassy, Goya confronts Casey. Casey tries to explain he was there to protect him but Goya does not believe him and has him gagged. The assassin arrives during the interrogation and poisons a cigar. Casey is unable to stop the Premier from smoking it, and watches helplessly as Goya collapses. Devon arrives home with Ellie, but before they can continue their evening, Devon is paged by the embassy to tend to Goya. Eager to set things right, he finds Chuck and tells him he can get them inside to rescue Casey. Chuck takes him to Castle to coordinate the rescue, but is interrupted by Sarah, who has also arrived to prepare to storm the place. Chuck tells her Devon can get them in quietly.

The three arrive at the embassy, dressed as doctors and a nurse, and are taken to the Premier. Sarah disables the guards, and while she and Chuck search for Casey, Devon tends to Goya. Meanwhile, the assassin introduces himself to Casey. He reveals himself as part of the Ring, who wants to maintain the status quo in Costa Gravas, and attempts to kill him. Casey breaks free and after a short fight defeats the assassin, but is shot in the leg by a guard who is himself quickly overpowered by Sarah. The three return to collect Devon, but they are captured by Goya's head bodyguard. He forces Chuck to operate on Casey's wounded leg himself. After encouragement by Sarah and Devon, Chuck flashes on the necessary techniques and successfully completes the operation. However, Goya is fading fast and needs a blood transfusion. The Premier has very rare AB negative blood, and only Casey is a match. Casey is anesthetized against his will so they can draw enough blood to save the Premier.

Back at Castle, Casey awakens to Beckman's thanks and congratulations. Goya survived and successfully announced his intentions to open Costa Gravas to open democratic elections. Goya wished to thank Casey personally, but instead sent him a case of pre-revolution Costa Gravas cigars. In a letter he named him the "Angel of Life," and praised his patriotism. Devon meets Chuck upstairs in the Orange Orange and announces his intention to "retire" from spy work before heading off to the hospital as Sarah arrives. Chuck and Sarah briefly discuss how to proceed with their cover, and agree to remain friends. As Devon finishes his rounds, he calls Ellie, who mentions a surprise — she has finished unpacking — and he promises to head right home after his last patient. However, as he steps into the room, the Ring assassin greets him.

Sarah arrives at Chuck's apartment. As he opens the door, she embraces him with a hug and whispers into his ear. Chuck is stunned, but they are interrupted by Ellie asking if they have seen Devon.

== Production ==
On September 23, 2009 Armand Assante was announced in the role of Premier Alejandro Goya, the leader of a Communist Revolution in the fictional Latin American nation of Costa Gravas. On December 16, 2009, it was announced that House's return after its winter break was rescheduled to compete with Chuck's regular timeslot premier.

Although Devon's fate at the end of the episode is unresolved, the promotion for "Chuck Versus Operation Awesome" airing at the end of the episode reveals that he was captured and mistaken for a spy by the Ring.

=== Production details ===
- This is the first episode of the series in which the characters of Morgan, Lester, and Jeff do not make an appearance.
- During the flashback, the instructor of Devon and Ellie's medical school class intended to walk them through dissection of the femoral artery. When Chuck is forced to operate on Casey, the bullet that struck him is lodged dangerously close to this artery.
- The episode confirms that Casey served in the United States Marine Corps.
- Devon is revealed to speak fluent Spanish.
- Sarah spent a year with the Secret Service.
- Casey's dog tags indicate he is a Protestant.

=== Flashes ===
- Chuck flashes on the news report in which Goya's apparent heart attack was announced.
- At the embassy gala, Chuck flashes on how to dance as a means of intercepting a suspected assassin without alarming Goya's guards.
- As they are being ejected, Chuck flashes on the real assassin.
- Chuck flashes on surgical techniques in order to operate on Casey's leg and save his life.

== Reception ==
"Chuck Versus the Angel de la Muerte" aired on January 11, 2010. Nielsen data indicated a total of 7.3 million viewers, with a Demo of 2.6/7. This made it the highest-rated Monday episode of Chuck since "Chuck Versus the Third Dimension" in January, 2009. Additionally, the episode grew 8% in the Adults 18-49 Demo, from a 2.5 to a 2.7, during its second half-hour.

Eric Goldman of IGN enjoyed seeing Devon integrated into Chuck's spy life after his learning the truth in "Chuck Versus the Colonel", finding praise for Devon's perspective on the stretched "Will They/Won't They" relationship between Chuck and Sarah and the material for Casey with his own antagonistic relationship with Goya, particularly Adam Baldwin's portrayal of Casey's silent fury over being forced to protect the Premier, and the amusing handling of Casey being shot in the same leg he just pulled a poison-filled needle from a moment before. Goldman found the ending scene of Devon entering the hospital room to run face-to-face into the assassin well handled, but criticized NBC's spoiling of the cliffhanger by showing Devon alive and well in the promotion for the next episode. IGN rated the episode an 8.8/10.

Alan Sepinwall of the New Jersey Star-Ledger similarly praised the decision to introduce Devon into the spy world, and greatly enjoyed the manner in which he was woven into the storyline. Sepinwall also greatly enjoyed the small showcase on Casey, Assante's "canned ham" performance as Premier Goya, and the tongue-in-cheek manner in which Chuck describes his last mission to Devon at the beginning of the episode and how it relates to many episodes of the series.

== References to popular culture ==
- Chuck calls Devon "007" while trying to douse his excitement over being on a mission. This is the famous call sign of James Bond.
- The name of Costa Gravas is a reference to Greek filmmaker Costa-Gavras (who played a minor part in Spies Like Us).
- When Chuck flashes on the Ring's poisoner, the material of the flash indicates he was involved in the 2006 poisoning of former KGB and FSB agent Alexander Litvinenko.
- The music played during the reception at the Costa Gravan embassy is from the video game Tropico. The game takes place on a fictitious Latin American island nation similar to Costa Gravas.
