= Tom Wu =

British actor (born 1972)

- Born: 15 May 1972 (age 54); British Hong Kong
- Occupation: Actor
- Years active: 1988–present
- Known for: Martial arts

Tom Wu (born 15 May 1972) is a Hong Kong-born British actor. He is a martial artist whose films include Shanghai Knights (2003), Out for a Kill (2003), Belly of the Beast (2003), Revolver (2005), Batman Begins (2005) and the Bollywood film Ra.One (2011). On television, he is known for his roles in the CBBC series Spirit Warriors (2010), the Netflix series Marco Polo (2014–2016) and the ITV crime drama Strangers (2018).

== Early life ==
Wu was born in Hong Kong and grew up in Chinatown, London. At the age of ten, Wu began practising various martial arts such as Hung Gar, Karate and Wing Chun and later took up acrobatics. In 1988, he competed for Britain at China's International wu-shu (martial arts) tournament, winning two bronze medals and a gold medal.

Wu went on to study at Guildhall School of Music and Drama.

== Career ==
Wu is one of the founding members of the British theatre company Yellow Earth Theatre, which was established in 1995. He's performed in their various productions over the years including The Magic Paintbrush, Play to Win, a co-production with Soho Theatre and The Whisper of a Leaf Falling at Battersea Arts Centre, Blue Remembered Hills and Behind the Chinese Takeaway. He choreographed their touring show Why The Lion Danced in 2013.

His further stage credits include M. Butterfly in 1989 at Shaftesbury Theatre and the original production of Miss Saigon in 1989. In 2005, he went on to perform in an adaptation of Tintin (character) at Barbican Theatre.

Wu is known for playing numerous Chinese Triad gang member or leader roles in various films. Such as Out for a Kill, Wake of Death, Revolver and Kick-Ass 2 and most recently, in 2019 playing a criminal and tattoo artist in the Fast & Furious spin-off Hobbs & Shaw and playing the Chinese Triad leader Lord George in the British film The Gentlemen.

One of his notable roles was in The Scorpion King 2 (2008) where he played Fung, a Chinese Ming dynasty soldier rescued by Mathayus and his allies and who later assists them towards the end of the film.

In 2014, he portrayed the character Hundred Eyes in the Netflix original series Marco Polo before its cancellation in late 2016. Wu played Sir George, King Arthur's mentor in King Arthur: Legend of the Sword in 2017. In 2018, Wu played Hong Kong inspector Daniel Tsui in the series Strangers. In 2019 he featured as Lord George in the Guy Ritchie film The Gentlemen. In 2021 he appeared in action feature Havoc.

== Personal life ==
Wu is married to violinist Sarah Chi Shang Liew.

== Filmography ==
Film & Television
Year	Title	Role	Notes
1988	Rockliffe's Babies	Ho Lee	Episode: "A Very Diplomatic Incident"
1991	The Godfather Squad	Triad Member In Restaurant	
1992	To Be the Best	Airline Official	TV movie
1996	Thief Takers	Chang Ming	2 episodes
1996	Cracker	Detective Lawyer	Episode: "White Ghost"
1998	Immortality	Gang Member	
1999	Rogue Trader	George Seow	
2003	Shanghai Knights	"Lead Boxer" Liu	
2003	Lara Croft: Tomb Raider – The Cradle of Life	Sean's Man	
2003	Out for a Kill	Li Bo	
2003	Belly of the Beast	General Jantapan	
2004	Wake of Death	Andy Wang	
2005	Batman Begins	Bhutanese Prison Guard #1	
2005	Revolver	Lord John	
2008	The Scorpion King 2: Rise of a Warrior	Fong	
2008	Mutant Chronicles	Corporal Juba Kim Wu	
2010	Spirit Warriors	Hwang	7 episodes
2011	Ra.One	Akashi	Hindi film
2012	Treasure Island	Joe Thoby	TV film
2012	Skyfall	Silva's Mercenary	
2013	RED 2	Security Officer	
2013	Kick-Ass 2	Genghis Carnage	
2014	Da Vinci's Demons	Quon Shan	5 episodes
2014–2016	Marco Polo	Hundred Eyes	18 episodes
2015	Marco Polo: One Hundred Eyes	Hundred Eyes	TV short
2016	Crouching Tiger, Hidden Dragon: Sword of Destiny		
2017	King Arthur: Legend of the Sword	Kung Fu George	
2018	Strangers	Detective Inspector Daniel Tsui	8 episodes
2019	Baliko	King	Short film
2019	Strike Back: Revolution	Uncle Laoshu	2 episodes
2019	Hobbs & Shaw	Tsoi	
2019	The Gentlemen	Lord George	
2020	The Host	Yong	
2022	The Sandman	Hippogriff (voice)	Episode: "Dream of a Thousand Cats"
2024	3 Body Problem	Count of the West	Episode: "Red Coast"
2025	Havoc	Wong	
2026	Shelter	Kamal	
