= Armand Assante =

American actor (born 1949)

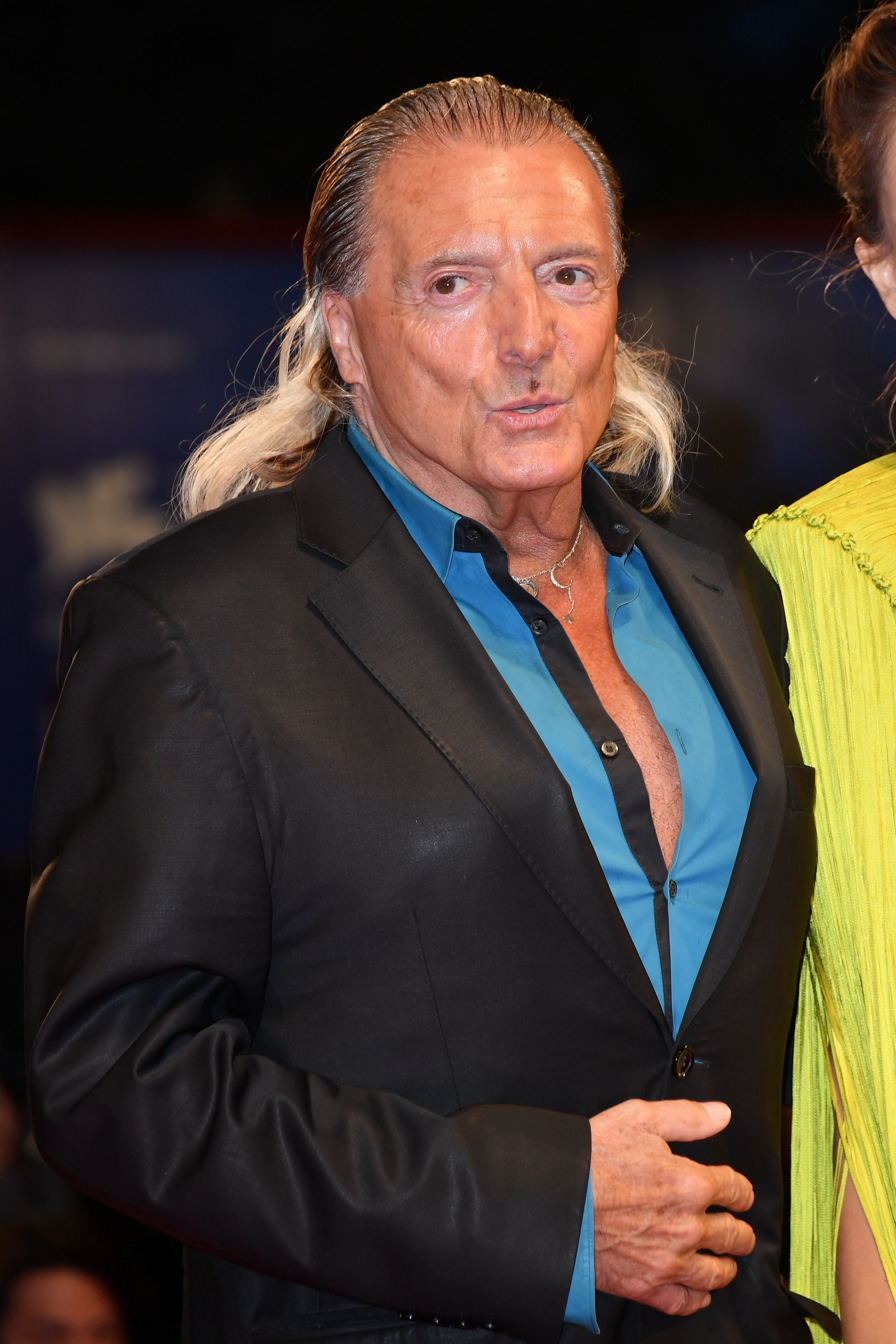
- Assante in 2018
- Born: Armand Anthony Assante, Jr. October 4, 1949 (age 76); New York City, U.S.
- Occupation: Actor
- Years active: 1974–present
- Spouse: Karen McArn (m. 1982; sep. 1992)
- Children: 2
- Website: armandassante.net

Armand Anthony Assante Jr. (/əˈsɑːnteɪ/; born October 4, 1949) is an American actor. He played mobster John Gotti in the 1996 HBO television film Gotti alongside Anthony Quinn, Odysseus in the 1997 miniseries adaptation of Homer's The Odyssey, Nietzsche in When Nietzsche Wept, and Mickey Spillane's Mike Hammer in 1982's I, the Jury. He has been nominated for two Primetime Emmy Awards (one win for his performance in Gotti), four Golden Globe Awards, and two Screen Actors Guild Awards. Assante also played 'Dominic Cattano', who was based on the real-life Lucchese family boss Carmine Tramunti, in the 2007 film American Gangster alongside Denzel Washington, Josh Brolin and Russell Crowe, which was nominated for two Oscars at the 80th Academy Awards in 2008.

== Early life ==
Armand Anthony Assante, Jr. was born on October 4, 1949 in New York City and raised in Cornwall, New York, the son of Armand Anthony Assante Sr., a painter and artist, and Katharine (née Healy), a music teacher, English teacher and poet. He is of Italian and Irish descent.

== Career ==
During the 1970s, Assante was a regular on two NBC soap operas, How to Survive a Marriage as Johnny McGhee and The Doctors as Mike Powers. His first film was The Lords of Flatbush (1974), although his work did not appear in the final cut of the film and the end credits misspelled his last name as Assanti. He starred in Prophecy (1979). His first on-screen role was playing Sylvester Stallone's brother in Paradise Alley (1978). A role that brought him greater attention came in 1980's Private Benjamin, as a handsome Frenchman who becomes the love interest of a U.S. soldier played by Goldie Hawn. In 1984, he portrayed the playboy violin virtuoso Maximillian Stein in the Dudley Moore comedy vehicle Unfaithfully Yours.

Assante has played a number of tough hero characters, such as his starring role as private eye Mike Hammer in the film I, the Jury (1982) as well as mafia gangsters such as Michael Moretti in Sidney Sheldon's Rage of Angels. In 1990, his role as Roberto Texador in Sidney Lumet's film Q&A garnered him a Golden Globe nomination. The following year, he portrayed Bugsy Siegel in Neil Simon's The Marrying Man (1991). The following year, he was seen as mafia boss Carol D'Allesandro in Hoffa (1992) starring Jack Nicholson, and crime kingpin John Gotti also in the same year The Mambo Kings with Antonio Banderas, in the 1996 made-for-television biopic Gotti, for which he won a Primetime Emmy Award for Outstanding Lead Actor in a Miniseries or a Movie.

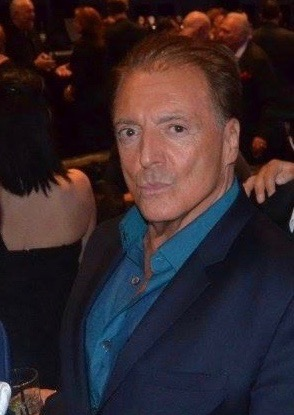
Assante at a film screening in Chicago 2015

In addition to mafia and "tough-guy" roles, Assante has appeared in historical dramas, such as Napoleon Bonaparte in 1987's Napoleon and Josephine: A Love Story opposite Jacqueline Bisset, Odysseus in The Odyssey, Friedrich Nietzsche in the film adaptation of Irving Yalom's novel When Nietzsche Wept, and as Sanchez, Queen Isabella's Minister of State, in 1492: Conquest of Paradise.

Other film appearances include one as a Cuban bandleader in The Mambo Kings (1992) opposite Antonio Banderas and in the adaptation of the science-fiction story Judge Dredd (1995) with Sylvester Stallone, his co-star in Paradise Alley. He appeared in the 2007 film American Gangster with Denzel Washington and Russell Crowe. He had a recurring guest star role in several episodes of NCIS, playing the international arms dealer René Benoit. He has also appeared in the 2009 horror film Smile as the mysterious Tollinger and portrayed Ernie in Sugar (marketed on Lifetime as Danger Below Deck). Outside of the U.S., he has participated in several film projects and humanitarian endeavors in Romania, Bulgaria, North Macedonia, Serbia, Croatia, Bosnia-Herzegovina, Kazakhstan, and Uzbekistan.

== Personal life ==
Assante had a high-profile relationship with Dyan Cannon, his co-star from 1978's Lady of the House. He married Karen McArn in 1982. The couple had two daughters. They separated in 1992. It is not clear whether or when they divorced. Assante has also dated Italian actress Mara Venier and Vanessa Constantino.

In 2013, Assante became a partner in his own premium cigar brand known as Ora Vivo Cigars.

== Filmography ==
=== Film ===
Year	Title	Role	Notes
1974	The Lords of Flatbush	Wedding Guest	
1975	First Ladies Diaries	Robards	Television film
1978	Paradise Alley	Lenny Carboni	
1978	Human Feelings	Johnny Turner	Television film
1978	Lady of the House	Ernest de Paulo	Television film
1978	The Pirate	Ahmed	Television film
1979	Prophecy	John Hawks	
1980	Little Darlings	Gary Callahan	
1980	Private Benjamin	Henri Alan Tremont	
1980	Sophia Loren: Her Own Story	Riccardo Scicolone	Television film
1982	Love and Money	Lorenzo Prado	
1982	I, the Jury	Mike Hammer	
1983	Rage of Angels	Michael Moretti	Television film
1984	Unfaithfully Yours	Maximillian Stein	
1984	Why Me?	James Stalling	Television film
1986	A Deadly Business	Charles Macaluso	Television film
1986	Belizaire the Cajun	Belizaire Breaux	
1987	Stranger in My Bed	Hal Slater	Television film
1987	Hands of a Stranger	Joe Hearn	Television film
1988	The Penitent	Juan Mateo	
1989	Passion and Paradise	Alfred de Marigny	Television film
1989	Animal Behavior	Mark Mathias	
1990	Q & A	Roberto Texador	Nominated—Golden Globe Award for Best Supporting Actor – Motion Picture
1990	Eternity	Romi/Sean	
1991	The Marrying Man	Bugsy Siegel	
1991	Fever	Ray	Television film
1992	The Mambo Kings	Caesar Castillo	
1992	1492: Conquest of Paradise	Gabriel Sánchez	
1992	Hoffa	Carl "Dally" D'Allesandro	
1993	Fatal Instinct	Ned Ravine	
1994	Blind Justice	Canaan	Television film
1994	Trial by Jury	Rusty Pirone	
1995	Judge Dredd	Rico Dredd	
1995	Kidnapped	Alan Breck Stewart	Television film
1996	Striptease	Lieutenant Al Garcia	
1996	Gotti	John Gotti	Television film Primetime Emmy Award for Outstanding Lead Actor in a Miniseries or a Special; Nominated—Golden Globe Award for Best Actor in a Miniseries or Motion Picture Made for Television; Nominated—Screen Actors Guild Award for Outstanding Performance by a Male Actor in a Miniseries or Television Movie
1999	The Hunley	Lieutenant George E. Dixon	Television film
2000	The Road to El Dorado	Tzekel-Kan	Voice; Nominated—Annie Award for Best Voice Acting by a Male Performer in an Animated Feature Production
2000	On the Beach	Commander Dwight Towers	Television film
2000	Looking for an Echo	Vince "Vinnie" Pirelli	
2001	Last Run	Frank Banner	
2001	After the Storm	Jean-Pierre	Television film
2001	One Eyed King	Hollis "Holly" Cone	
2002	Federal Protection	Frank Carbone	Television film
2002	Partners in Action	Jack Cunningham	
2003	Tough Luck	Ike	
2003	Citizen Verdict	Sam Patterson	
2003	Consequence	Sam Tyler	
2005	Dot.Kill	Charlie Daines	
2005	The Third Wish	Benefactor	
2005	Mirror Wars	Henry York	
2005	Two for the Money	C.M. Novian	
2005	Confessions of a Pit Fighter	Argento	
2005	The Commuters	Donald	Television film
2005	Ennemis Publics	-	
2005	Rambam: The Story of Maimonides	Yitzchak	
2006	Funny Money	Genero	
2006	Surveillance	Harley	
2006	Soul's Midnight	Simon	
2006	Dead Lenny	Tony "Thick"	
2007	Casanova's Last Stand	Sebastian Marr	
2007	Mexican Sunrise	Salvidar	
2007	California Dreamin'	Captain Doug Jones	Nominated—Gopo Award for Best Actor in a Leading Role
2007	When Nietzsche Wept	Friedrich Nietzsche	
2007	Children of Wax	Kemal	
2007	American Gangster	Dominic Cattano	Nominated—Screen Actors Guild Award for Outstanding Performance by a Cast in a Motion Picture
2008	The Man Who Came Back	Amos	
2008	Shark Swarm	Hamilton Lux	Television film
2009	The Lost	Kevin	Television film
2009	The Steam Experiment	Detective Mancini	
2009	La Linea	Padre Antonio	
2009	Smile	Edward Tollinger	
2009	Chicago Overcoat	Stefano D'Agnostino	
2009	Death Valley Screamers: Bonnie & Clyde	Casino Owner	Short
2009	The Bleeding	Jake Plummer	
2009	Breaking Point	Marty Berlin	
2010	Shadows in Paradise	Captain John "Ghost" Santo	
2010	Magic Man	Lieutenant Taper	
2010	Killer by Nature	Eugene Branch	
2011	The Return of Joe Rich	Uncle Dom	
2011	Jesse	Dominick	
2011	Guido	Lorenzo De Costa	
2012	The Night Never Sleeps	Inspector Romanelli	
2013	Dead Man Down	Lon Gordon	
2013	The Fix	Vincent	Short
2013	Once Upon a Time in Brooklyn	Joseph Baldano Sr.	
2013	Assumed Killer	Aaron Banfield	
2014	See You in Montevideo	Hotchkins	
2014	Hunting the Phantom	Charles Ingrim	
2014	A Fine Step	Alejandro Bolivar	
2014	Charlie Mantle	Inspector Bennett	
2014	In Between Engagements	Alonzo	
2015	Diamond Cartel	Mussa	
2015	Leaves of the Tree	Joe Buffa	
2015	Sicilian Vampire	Vince	
2015	Kids vs Monsters	Damian	
2015	Blind Pass	Richard James	
2016	Beyond the Game	Mr. Leone	
2016	Stressed to Kill	Paul Jordan	
2016	The Red Maple Leaf	Agent Joseph Cortez	
2016	Wasn't Afraid to Die	Paul	
2016	Blowtorch	Canarsie	
2017	First Law	Don Nowet	
2017	You Can't Have It	The Man	
2017	Joe's War	Dr. Galante	
2017	The Wanderers: The Quest of the Demon Hunter	Louis	
2017	The Neighborhood	Tucci	
2017	Power of Silence	The Narrator	
2018	Con Man	Jack Saxon	
2018	Darc	Lafique	
2018	The P.I.M.P.	Armando	
2019	The Brave	Frank Pedulla	
2019	General	Andreas	
2020	Infamous Six	Dr. Albert Cioran	
2021	The Match	Camp Commander	
"Mister Mayfair"	Max		
2022	Sugar	Ernie	
2023	Don Q	Don Q	
2024	Oak	Abe	

=== Television series ===
Year	Title	Role	Notes
1975	How to Survive a Marriage	Johnny McGee	Episode: "Episode #1.325"
1975–1976	The Doctors	Dr. Michael Powers	Regular cast
1977	Kojak	Tom Ryan	Episode: "Caper on a Quiet Street"
1979	Mrs. Columbo	Freddie Faust	Episode: "A Chilling Surprise"
1985	Evergreen	Joe Friedman	TV miniseries
1987	Napoleon and Josephine: A Love Story	Napoleon Bonaparte	TV miniseries
1988	Jack the Ripper	Richard Mansfield	TV miniseries Nominated—Primetime Emmy Award for Outstanding Supporting Actor in a Miniseries or a Special; Nominated—Golden Globe Award for Best Supporting Actor in a Series, Miniseries or Motion Picture Made for Television
1997	The Odyssey	Odysseus	TV miniseries Nominated—Golden Globe Award for Best Actor in a Miniseries or Motion Picture Made for Television; Nominated—Online Film & Television Association Award for Best Actor in a Motion Picture or Miniseries; Nominated—Satellite Award for Best Miniseries or Motion Picture Made for Television
2002	Push, Nevada	Mr. Smooth	Episode: "The Amount"
2006	ER	Richard Elliot	Recurring cast: season 12, guest: season 13
2007	NCIS	René "La Grenouille" Benoit	Recurring cast: season 4, guest: season 5
2008	October Road	Gabriel Diaz	Recurring cast: season 2
2010	Chuck	Premier Alejandro Goya	Episode: "Chuck Versus the Angel de la Muerte & Coup d'Etat"
2010	Human Target	Joubert	Episode: "Christopher Chance"
2015	Law & Order: Special Victims Unit	Nicolas Amaro	Episode: "Padre Sandunguero"
2018–2019	The Family Business	Sal Dash	Main cast: season 1
2018–2019	The Deuce	Mr. Martino	Guest: season 2, recurring cast: season 3
2019	General	Andreas	Episode: "Episode #1.2"
2022	Salvage Marines	Kelkis Morturi	Main cast

== Awards and nominations ==
Year	Award	Category	Nominated work	Results	Ref.
2016	Action On Film International Film Festival	Outstanding Cast Performance – Feature	The Red Maple Leaf	Won	
2000	Annie Awards	Best Voice Acting by a Male Performer in an Animated Feature Production	The Road to El Dorado	Nominated	
2018	Garden State Film Festival	Most Valuable Player	—N/a	Won	
1988	Golden Globe Awards	Best Supporting Actor in a Series, Miniseries or Motion Picture Made for Television	Jack the Ripper	Nominated	
1990	Golden Globe Awards	Best Supporting Actor – Motion Picture	Q & A	Nominated	
1996	Golden Globe Awards	Best Actor in a Miniseries or Motion Picture Made for Television	Gotti	Nominated	
1997	Golden Globe Awards	Best Actor in a Miniseries or Motion Picture Made for Television	The Odyssey	Nominated	
2008	Gopo Awards	Best Actor in a Leading Role	California Dreamin'	Nominated	
2017	Ischia Global Film & Music Festival	Ischia Documentary Feature Award	The Man Who Unlocked the Universe	Won	
1997	Online Film & Television Association Awards	Best Actor in a Motion Picture or Miniseries	The Odyssey	Nominated	
1989	Primetime Emmy Awards	Outstanding Supporting Actor in a Miniseries or a Special	Jack the Ripper	Nominated	
1997	Primetime Emmy Awards	Outstanding Lead Actor in a Miniseries or a Special	Gotti	Won	
1997	Satellite Awards	Best Miniseries or Motion Picture Made for Television	The Odyssey	Nominated	
1996	Screen Actors Guild Awards	Outstanding Performance by a Male Actor in a Miniseries or Television Movie	Gotti	Nominated	
2007	Screen Actors Guild Awards	Outstanding Performance by a Cast in a Motion Picture	American Gangster	Nominated	
2007	Westchester Film Festival	Lifetime Achievement Award	—N/a	Won	

=== Other recognition ===
In 2010, Assante received a star on the Italian Walk of Fame in Toronto, Ontario, Canada.
