= Salvage Marines =

American television series

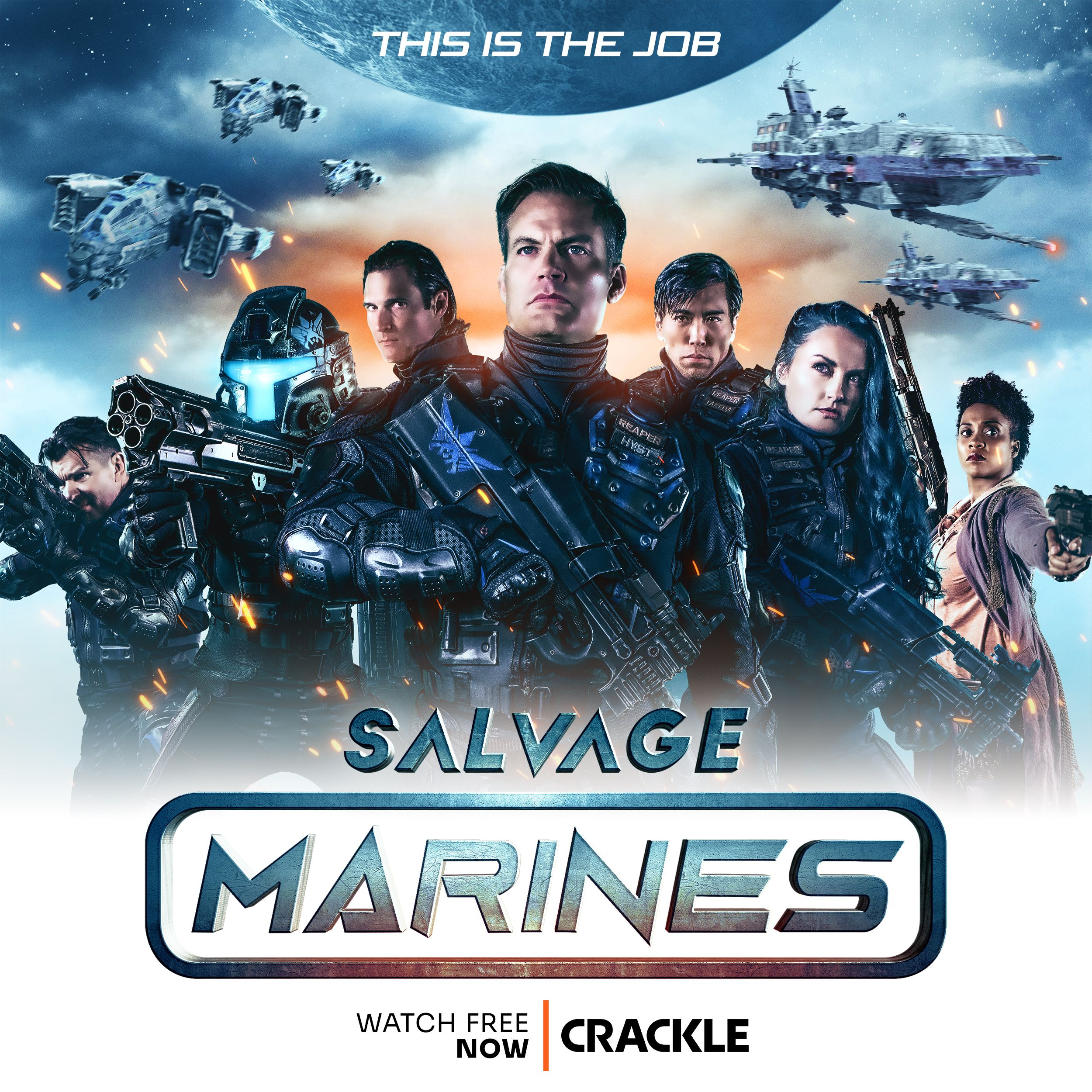
- Genre: Action; Adventure; Drama; Science fiction
- Created by: Sean-Michael Argo; Rafael Jordan; Jamie R. Thompson
- Country of origin: United States
- Original language: English
- No. of seasons: 1
- No. of episodes: 6

Production
- Executive producers: Gary Raskin; Lee Beasley; Karinne Behr; Alastair Burlingham; Loni Farhi
- Producers: Philippe Martinez; Jake Seal; Jamie R. Thompson
- Production location: United Kingdom
- Cinematography: Brad Rushing
- Editor: Eric Potter
- Running time: 41–45 minutes
- Production companies: Lighthouse Pictures; Black Hangar Studios; Creation Film and Television; Orwo Studios

Original release
- Network: Popcornflix and Crackle
- Release: July 28, 2022

Salvage Marines is an American science fiction television series, created by Sean-Michael Argo, Rafael Jordan, and Jamie R. Thompson, based on the Necrospace novel series by Sean-Michael Argo, and starring Casper Van Dien. The show premiered on July 28, 2022 with all six episodes of the first season being available to watch on that date.

The North American distribution rights were acquired by Screen Media on June 7, 2022.

The series was first announced by SPI International on April 10, 2019 as one of four TV series they would be producing, in partnership with Philippe Martinez.

== Premise ==
The series is set in a dystopian future where society's downtrodden are offered a better future by serving in a platoon of deep space combat soldiers. Van Dien's character, Samuel Hyst, is a factory worker living on the planet Baen 6. He joins the military after learning his wife is pregnant and his societal debt would be passed on to his child.

== Cast and characters ==
- Casper Van Dien as Samuel Hyst
- Peter Shinkoda as Ben Takeda
- Armand Assante as Kelkis Morturi
- Jennifer Wenger as Jada Sek
- Kevin Porter as Boss Wynn Marsters
- Linara Washington as Sura Hyst
- Gianni Capaldi as Tyrol Gaius
- Shane Graham as Harold Marr
- Ashley Mary Nunes as Yvonne White
- Eddie Davenport as Patrick Baen
- Nicole Reddinger as Sasha
- Elle Lamont as Boss Maggie Taggart
- Ciera Foster as Boss Lucinda Ulanti
- Aaron Schoenke as Logan Shaw
- George Kosturos as Spencer Green
- Lauren Compton as Virginia Tillman
- Austin Parsons as Aaron Baen
- B. Dave Walters as Imago
- Ritchie Montgomery as The Administrator
- Whitney Hice as Andrea Baen
- Almog Pail as Bianca Kade
- Jessica Uberuaga as Gretchen
- Isaiah LaBorde as Womack

== Episodes ==
No.	Title	Directed by	Written by	Original release date
1	"Tango Platoon"	Shaun Paul Piccinino	Sean-Michael Argo & Rafael Jordan	July 28, 2022
2	"Fuel Cells & Mech Warriors"	Shaun Paul Piccinino	Sean-Michael Argo & Rafael Jordan	July 28, 2022
3	"Death in Downspire"	Shaun Paul Piccinino	Sean-Michael Argo & Rafael Jordan	July 28, 2022
4	"Rift in the Universe"	Shaun Paul Piccinino	Sean-Michael Argo & Rafael Jordan	July 28, 2022
5	"Helion Engineers & Grotto Greed"	Shaun Paul Piccinino	Sean-Michael Argo & Rafael Jordan	July 28, 2022
6	"Showdown on Planet Gedra"	Shaun Paul Piccinino	Sean-Michael Argo & Rafael Jordan	July 28, 2022

== Marketing ==
The series conducted a panel at San Diego Comic-Con including cast members Casper Van Dien, Peter Shinkoda, Jennifer Wenger, and Linara Washington, as well as writer/creator Rafael Jordan and director Shaun Paul Piccinino.

== Release ==
The series was released on Popcornflix on July 28, 2022, and was later added to Crackle on September 1, 2022.
