= Philippe Martinez =

American film producer

Philippe Martínez
- Education: National Academy Of Dramatic Art, Marseille
- Occupations: Film producer; Film director; Screenwriter; Film actor
- Years active: 1994-present
- Known for: The Chaos Experiment

Philippe Martínez is a French film producer, director, screenwriter, actor, and former President of the Odéon Theater in Marseille.

== Career ==
From 1988 through 1990, Martinez was President of the Odéon Theater, Marseille. In late 1990, he moved to the United States and became Chairman of the Board of Ulysses Entertainment. From 1996 to 1999 he headed Los Angeles–based Betar Entertainment and served as executive producer on Ultimate Weapon and In Her Defense. In 1999, Martinez launched Bauer-Martinez Studios and produced over 14 films including The Piano Player, Out of Season, The Defender, Dot.Kill, House of 9, and Land of the Blind. More recently, he produced Modigliani. As film director, Martinez completed Citizen Verdict, Wake of Death, The Steam Experiment, and Viktor.

== Filmography ==
Year	Title	Director	Producer	Writer
1994	The Night and the Moment	No	Yes	No
1994	Getting In	No	Yes	No
1998	Musketeers Forever	No	Yes	Yes
1998	The Ultimate Weapon	No	Yes	No
1999	In Her Defense	No	Yes	No
1999	The Collectors	No	Yes	No
2002	The Piano Player	No	Yes	No
2002	The Contract	No	Yes	No
2002	The Good War	No	Yes	No
2003	Shoreditch	No	Yes	No
2003	Citizen Verdict	Yes	Yes	Yes
2003	Absolon	No	Yes	No
2004	Out of Season	No	Yes	No
2004	The Defender	No	Yes	No
2004	Wake of Death	Yes	Yes	Yes
2004	Modigliani	No	Yes	No
2005	Harsh Times	No	Yes	No
2005	House of 9	No	Yes	No
2006	Van Wilder: The Rise of Taj	No	Yes	No
2006	The Groomsmen	No	Yes	No
2006	Irish Jam	No	Yes	No
2006	Land of the Blind	No	Yes	No
2006	The Number One Girl	No	Yes	No
2007	The Flock	No	Yes	No
2007	The Christmas Miracle of Jonathan Toomey	No	Yes	No
2007	I Could Never Be Your Woman	No	Yes	No
2007	Mexican Sunrise	No	Yes	No
2009	The Chaos Experiment	Yes	Yes	No
2010	Game of Death	No	Yes	No
2014	Viktor	Yes	No	Yes
2019	General Commander	Yes	Yes	Yes
2021	Father Christmas Is Back	Yes	No	No
2022	Salvage Marines	No	Yes	No
2022	Christmas in the Caribbean	Yes	No	No

Actor

- Déjà mort (1998)
- The Piano Player (2002) as Fernand
- All About April (2012)
- Little Reaper (2013) as Zombie Victim
