= Eilidh Watt =

Scottish Gaelic writer

- Born: Eilidh MacAskill; 22 January 1908; Skinidin, Isle of Skye, Scotland
- Died: 25 August 1996 (aged 88); Inverness, Scotland
- Resting place: Isle of Skye
- Education: University of Glasgow
- Occupations: Gaelic writer, broadcaster, teacher
- Spouse: Robert Watt

Eilidh MacAskill Watt (22 January 1908 – 25 August 1996) was a Gaelic broadcaster, teacher, and writer from the Isle of Skye. She was a campaigner for equality and women's rights, and "almost certainly the most prolific of all the writers of short fiction in Gaelic".

== Early life and education ==
Eilidh (Helen) MacAskill was born in Skinidin on the Isle of Skye on 22 January 1908. Her mother was Chirsty MacLean, and her father was the local blacksmith, Malcolm MacAskill. She attended Portree High School and graduated from Glasgow University.

== Career ==
Watt worked as a school teacher, teaching English in Tarbert, Harris, and Portree before marrying Robert Watt and relocating to his native Dunfermline. Upon her marriage, she was required to retire from teaching, but was brought back into service as a teacher during the Second World War, rising to the position of Deputy Head of Moss-side Secondary School in Cowdenbeath. She became a campaigner for equality with both the Educational Institute of Scotland and the newly formed Commonwealth Party.

== Literary contributions ==
Eilidh Watt was a prolific writer of Scottish Gaelic short stories and a regular contributor to the quarterly magazine Gairm; she pioneered child-oriented stories as well. A number of her short stories were also collected and published as books. Moray Watson writes that the "quality of Watt's stories is variable, but there is no doubt that much of her best writing appears in Gairm rather than in her published books." Some of her Gaelic-language stories have science fiction themes, including extrasensory perception (which she described as something she personally experienced), postapocalyptic settings and interplanetary societies.

== Later life ==
Watt retired in 1969 and moved back to the Isle of Skye, where she lived until she died in Inverness on 25 August 1996, at the age of 88. She was survived by her son, Ronald Watt.

== Selected works ==
=== Books ===
- A’ Bhratach Dhealrach (1972) Club Leabhar
- Latha a’ Choin Duibh agus Ipilidh (1972) Club Leabhar
- Gun Fhois (1987) Macdonald

=== Anthologies ===
- Coinneach D. MacDhomhnaill (deas.). Briseadh na Cloiche, agus sgeulachdan eile. Glaschu: Roinn nan Cànan Ceilteach, Oilthigh Ghlaschu., 1970. - Eilidh Watt. ‘An t-Ogha’, 77–81.
- Donnchadh MacGuaire (deas.). Mu ‘n cuairt an Cagailte. Inbhirnis: Club Leabhar, 1972. - Eilidh Watt. ‘An Reic’, pp. 57–63. and ‘Alasdair Dubh Domhnallach’, pp. 73–79.
- Amannan : Sgialachdan Goirid. [Duneidinn]: U & R Chambers, 1979. - Eilidh Watt. ‘Teine a Loisgeas’, pp. 17–27. and ‘An t-As-Creidhmeach’, pp. 95–100

=== Magazine contributions - Gairm ===
- An Samhradh 1971, ‘A’ Bhàs’, pp. 217–220.
- An t-Earrach 1972, ‘Aon Fhacal anns an Dus’, pp. 111–116.
- An Samhradh 1972, ‘An Duine Cumanta’, pp. 205–209.
- Am Foghar 1972, ‘An Tàcharan’, pp. 335–340.
- An t-Earrach 1973, ‘An Còta’, pp. 123–126.
- An Samhradh 1973, ‘An Comharradh’, pp. 213–214.
- Am Foghar 1973, ‘Sgiathan an Dealain-Dé’, pp. 313–318.
- An Geamhradh 1973, ‘Solus’, pp. 60–63.
- An t-Earrach 1974, ‘Anns a’ Cheann Thall’, pp. 159–162.
- Am Foghar 1974, ‘An Iobairt’, pp. 353–357.
- An Geamhradh 1974–75, ‘Bannan’, pp. 13–18.
- An t-Earrach 1975, ‘Calman Geal’, pp. 155–160.
- An Geamhradh 1975–76, ‘An Cumhnant’, pp. 11–16.
- An Samhradh 1976, ‘An Té-Leasachaidh’, pp. 239–242.
- Am Foghar 1976, ‘Far-Ainm’, pp. 310–314.
- An Samhradh 1977, ‘Curstaidh’, pp. 257–261.
- An Geamhradh 1977–78, ‘Buadhach is Sgriost’, pp. 23–26.
- An Samhradh 1978, ‘Ribeannan Dearga’, pp. 275–276.
- An t-Earrach 1979, ‘Sligean Falamh’, pp. 121–125.
- Am Foghar 1979, ‘Seonaidh na Theinn’, pp. 333–338.
- An t-Earrach 1980, ‘Dà Iomhaigh’, pp. 176–180.
- Samhradh / Foghar 1980, ‘Sinne na Fir a-Nis’, pp. 280–284.
- An t-Earrach 1981, ‘Lorgaidh an Uair an Duine’, pp. 136–138.
- An Samhradh 1981, ‘Dìleas’, pp. 249–254.
- Am Foghar 1981, ‘Duine Beag is Duine Mór’, pp. 308–313.
- An Geamhradh 1981–82), ‘Cha B’ann Mar Seo a Bha Iad air T BH’, pp. 41–44.
- An t-Earrach 1982, ‘Puraraich Cait’, pp. 130–134.
- An Samhradh 1982, ‘An Ceathramh Fear’, pp. 219–223.
- Am Foghar 1982, ‘ B’e’, pp. 337–341.
- An Geamhradh 1982–83, ‘An Déidh-Làimh’, pp. 33–37.
- An t-Earrach 1983, ‘A’ Tighinn gu Cala’, pp. 111–116.
- An Samhradh 1983, ‘Roghainn’, pp. 232–236.
- An Geamhradh 1983–84, ‘Na Màthraichean’, pp. 61–65.
- An t-Earrach 1984, ‘Car Eile ‘n Adhairc an Daimh’, pp. 159–163.
- Am Foghar 1984, ‘An Seot’, pp. 354–358.
- An Geamhradh 1984–85, ‘Cha Chreach Thu Nead Na Smeòraich’, pp. 28–32.
- Am Foghar 1985, ‘Ainm a’ Chiad Ghille’, pp. 335–338.
- An Geamhradh 1985–86, ‘Crìochan’, pp. 47–52.
- An Samhradh 1986, ‘Bràithrean’, pp. 248–255
- An Geamhradh 1987/88, ‘Seumas’, pp. 71–86
- An Samhradh 1988, ‘Roghainn’, pp. 260–263.
- An t-Earrach 1989, ‘An Neo-dhàimheil’, pp. 124–127.
- An Samhradh 1990, ‘Mordo Beag’, pp. 270–275.
- An Geamhradh 1990–91, ‘Seann Cleasan is Cleasan Ura’, pp. 19–22
- An t-Earrach 1992, ‘Duilleag air a Sèideadh Leis a’ Ghaoith’, pp. 141–147.
- Am Foghar 1993, ‘Is Toigh Leis an Fheannaig’, pp. 319–322.
- An t-Earrach 1995, ‘An Spìonadair’, pp. 183–185
