= Eilidh MacQueen =

Thailand-based Scottish actress (born 1986)

- Born: 20 May 1986 (age 40); Scotland
- Occupation: Actress

Eilidh MacQueen (born 20 May 1986 in Troon, Scotland) is a Thailand-based Scottish actress.

== Early career ==
Eilidh Kate MacQueen was born in Scotland and lived in New Zealand, Australia, Scotland, Dubai and Thailand, before settling in Bangkok, Thailand with her partner, actor and Thai pop star Louis Scott. Her early career involved a litany of modelling jobs, including FHM Thailand in which she was voted 25th sexiest female in the world, catwalk for La Perla, Yves Saint Lauren, Lanvin and Chanel, catalogue work for Motorola, Samsung, Christian Dior, commercials for Panasonic and Toyota and videos for Thai music acts Joey Boy and 'Jiwa'.

== Film ==
MacQueen has been involved in four feature films to date, playing supporting roles, notably in Belly of the Beast, a film starring Steven Seagal.

2003	Belly of the Beast	Siu-Tung Ching
2005	The Ranger	CM Film
2005	Sheesha	Ashu Trikha
2005	The Trek	Chanchai Pantasi
