= Tony Schiena =

CEO, government contractor and actor

- Born: Antonio Schiena; Springs South Africa
- Occupation: Actor
- Years active: 2004–present

Tony Schiena a former South African intelligence operator turned government defense contractor and actor. He is the CEO of MOSAIC (Multi Operational Security Agency Intelligence Company), a company providing private security, counter terrorism training, and other similar services. Schiena was featured in the Vice documentary Superpower for Hire. He has been credited for exposing ISIS use of chemical warfare against the Kurds in Iraq. Schiena has appeared on CNN, FOX News, CBC, BBC, ABC and various other networks on the subject of terrorism and espionage, ISIS, and modern-day slavery.

== Biography ==
He drew attention to ISIS's use of chemical weapons including mustard gas, chlorine gas, and possibly sarin against the Kurds.

He wrote and starred in the movie Darc.
