= Guy Farley =

British film composer (born 1963)

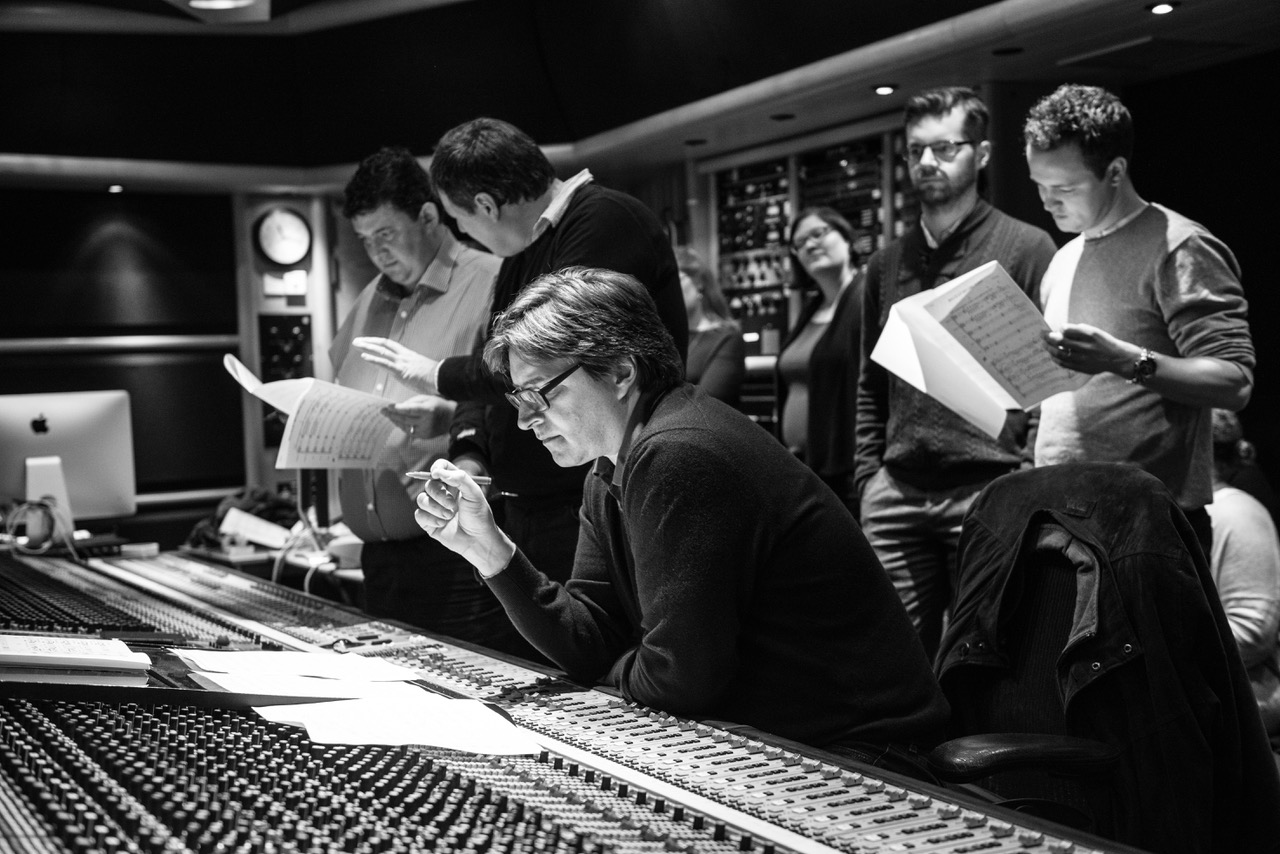
Guy Farley (2017)

Guy Farley is a British film composer, arranger and conductor.

Farley has composed scores for over 50 films, including independent films in UK, Italy, Portugal and Germany and for TV series in UK and US, including The Crown and US series True Justice.

With a wide range of films including Oscar nominated Cashback (2006), Modigliani (2004),The Flock (2008), Clive Barkers ‘Book of Blood’ (2009), Oliver Stone’s documentary ‘A Good American’ (2015), That Good Night (2017) and Silver Skates (2021).

In 1992 he met John Barry, who had been a great influence on him and spent time with him as he recorded his score for Chaplin at Abbey Road. This experience had a profound experience altering the course of his life to one fully engaged in music.

As well as regular scores for films, Farley has also written and arranged for major brand commercials, Virgin Atlantic, Super Bowl, Paralympics, Commonwealth Games and for Sony for the Bond film Skyfall.

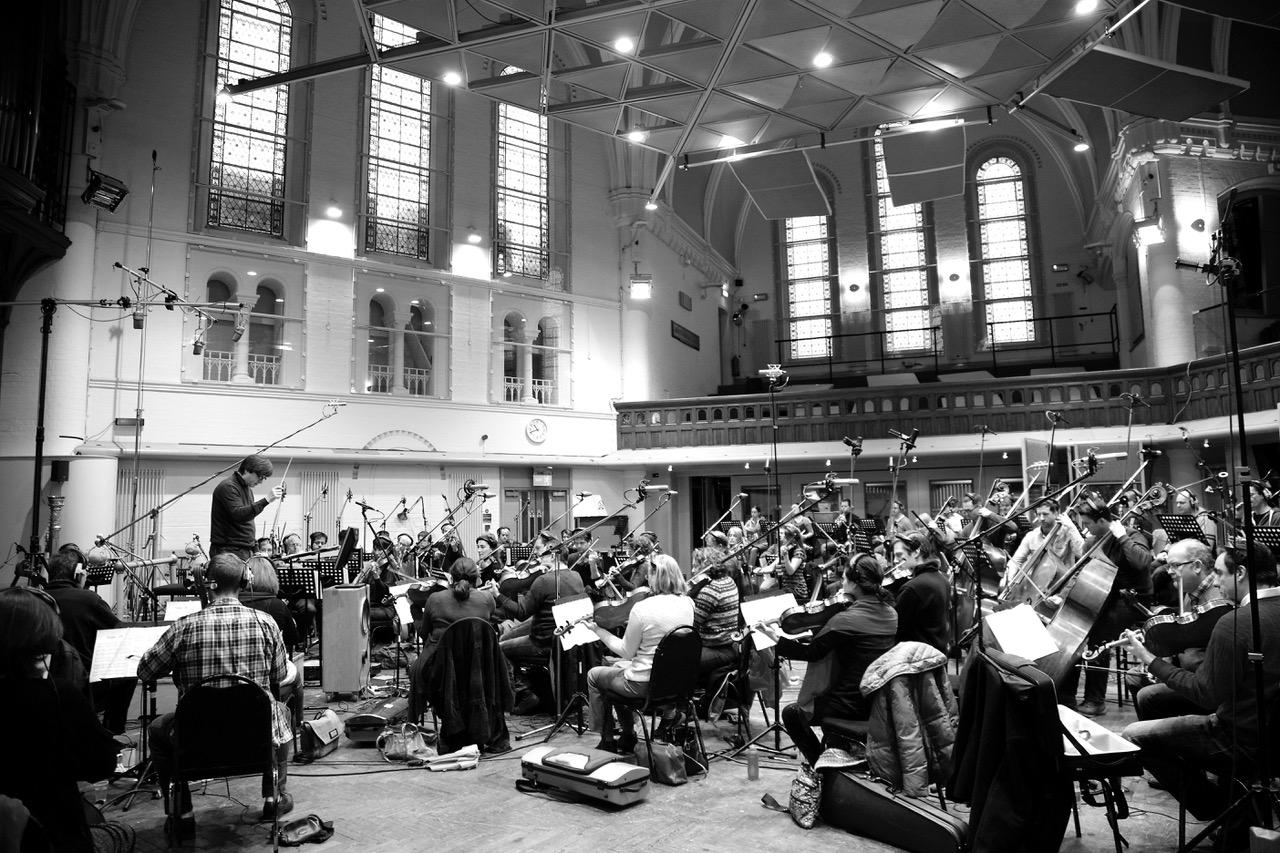
Guy Farley Conducting Orchestra at Air Studios, London

== Biography ==
Guy Farley was born in Haslemere, Surrey. He began playing piano at the age of 6, studying as a pianist to the age of 18. He also studied organ at Douai Abbey, where he was also a choral singer and served on the Douai choral committee. His musical interests were wide and varied, from classical, studying Rachmaninoff, Debussy and Ravel as well as numerous film scores and a love of Jazz. He collected as many John Barry’s soundtracks as he could find. Other sources of inspiration included Lalo Schifrin, Jerry Goldsmith, Michel Legrand and Francis Lai.

He went on to study conducting at Morley College in London under Paul Sarcich and with Peter Stark at the Royal College of Music.

== Career ==
Farley scored his first film in 1986, a short entitled "Rock A Bye Baby" for a young British director Anthony Hickox. He collaborated with Hickox on a number of the director’s films over the years.

After a period of time away from music, Farley eventually signed a publishing deal in 1997 with Warner Chappell and embarked on a career in film music. In that year he scored The Gardener with Malcolm McDowell and Darkness Falls (1999) with Ray Winstone.

He went on to score numerous documentaries for the Discovery Channel and National Geographic which allowed him to work with many world instrumentalists and write in many different styles. In 2003 Farley took a production room at Sphere Studios in London, a state of the art studio complex used by many artists, musicians and producers.

In 2003 alone he scored 5 films, including the biopic Madre Teresa with Olivia Hussey and "Modigliani" with Andy Garcia. The studio environment also led to collaborations, arrangements and productions with artists such as Mica Paris, Sugababes, Duran Duran, Leona Lewis and Amy Winehouse.

As well as regular scores for films, Farley has also written and arranged for major brand commercials, Virgin Atlantic, Super Bowl, Paralympics, Commonwealth Games and for Sony Music for the Bond film Skyfall.

In 2016 Farley wrote additional music for the first series of The Crown, collaborated again with director Sean Ellis on Anthropoid and was commissioned by Bear Grylls to score his live show "Endeavour". In 2018 Farley was commissioned by the grandson of Douglas Bader to compose a suite for orchestra in memory of Bader. Recorded at Abbey Road Studios, the music included original WWII sirens and an original air base scramble bell.

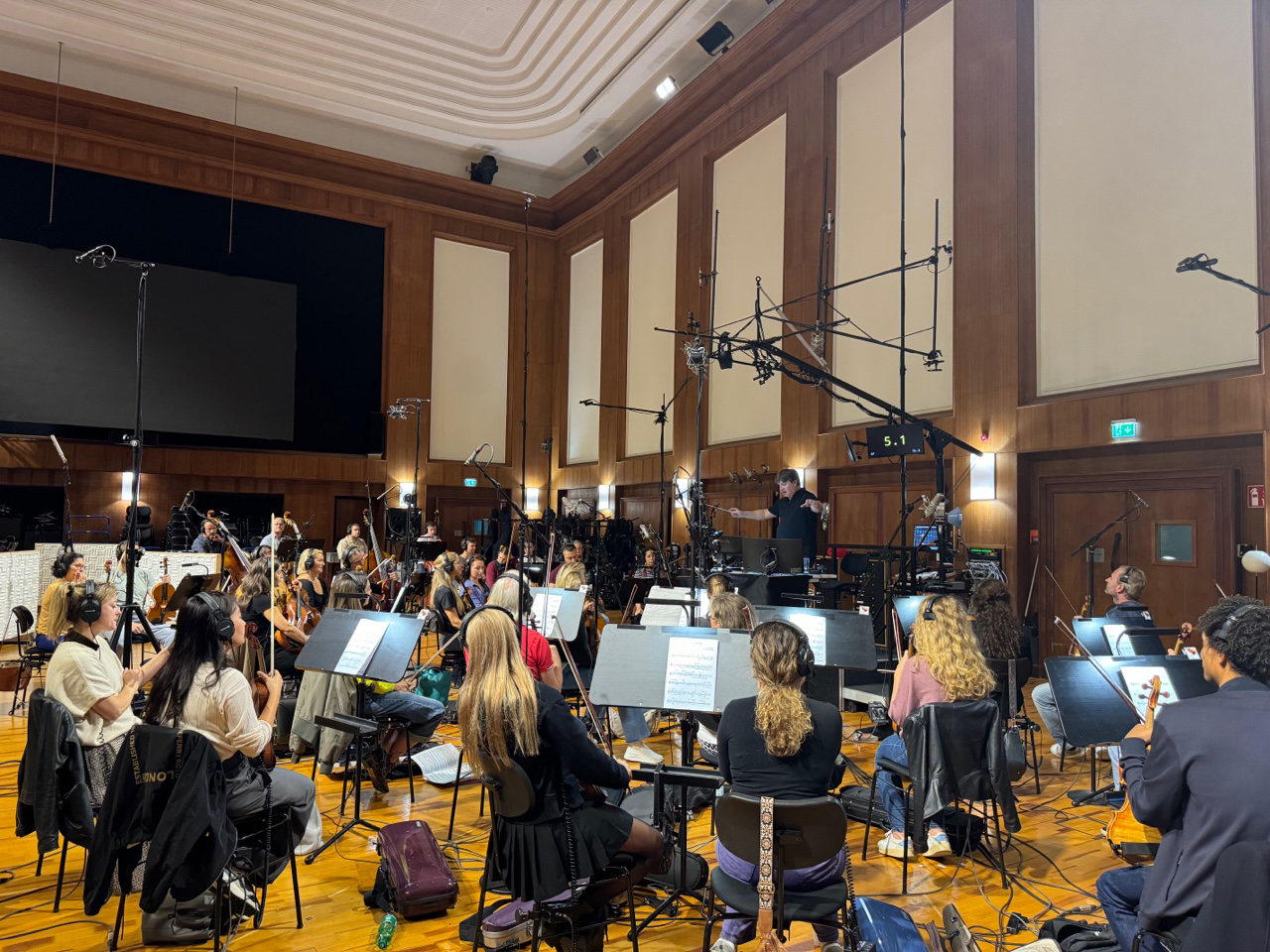
The Boy and The Octopus (Taika Wahiti) scoring session in Vienna, at Synchron Studio

In 2021 Farley designed and built Gorilla Studios in Battersea, a studio complex of 5 studios with resident musicians, composers and producers. Farley is resident here full time.

In 2023 Farley accompanied Tokio Myers in concert performing with full orchestra at Battersea Power Station.

In 2024, Farley scored The Boy and the Octopus for Disney, a short film directed by Taika Waititi. This was conducted by Farley at the Synchron Stage in Vienna.

== Awards ==
In 2014, Farley was nominated for 4 Music and Sound Awards.
