= Prince of Central Park (disambiguation) =

The Prince of Central Park is a young adult novel by Evan H. Rhodes published in 1975. It has been adapted a number of times

- The Prince of Central Park - a 1977 television film
- Prince of Central Park - a musical that played on Broadway in the 1980s
- Prince of Central Park - a 2000 film
