= Richard H. Blake =

American actor and singer (born 1975)

Richard H. Blake (born May 17, 1975 as Richard Harrison Thomas) is an American actor and singer best known for his work in musical theatre, most notably as Warner Huntington III in the original Broadway production of Legally Blonde.

== Early life ==
Blake was born in Providence, Rhode Island before his theatre career began as a child performer. He attended high school at the Professional Children's School in New York City.

== Career ==
Blake made his Broadway debut in Teddy & Alice, starring Len Cariou at the Minskoff Theatre in 1987. The following year he appeared as Boy McDuff in Macbeth, starring Christopher Plummer and Glenda Jackson, on Broadway at the Mark Hellinger Theatre.

Blake then starred as the title character in the 1989 Broadway musical Prince of Central Park, becoming (at 14) the youngest Broadway performer to have his name above the title of the show. However, the show closed after only 4 performances.

In 1990, he appeared on Star Search, beating future Tony-winner Sutton Foster.

Back on Broadway, he took over the role of Roger Davis in Rent and originated the role of Gus in the 1999 musical Saturday Night Fever; he also joined the national tour as Tony Manero. He also took over the role Link Larkin in the Broadway production of Hairspray.

Blake originated the role of Glen Guglia in the 2006 Broadway version of The Wedding Singer at the Al Hirschfeld Theatre. He then starred in the Legally Blonde musical at the Palace Theatre, originating the role of Warner Huntington III alongside Laura Bell Bundy and Christian Borle. He can be heard on both The Wedding Singer and Legally Blonde cast recordings.

Blake had a lengthy run as Fiyero on the First National tour of Wicked after replacing Cliffton Hall on November 18, 2008. He toured North America with the show until February 13, 2011. He then replaced Kyle Dean Massey as Fiyero on Broadway beginning March 29, 2011. He exited the Broadway company on July 29, 2012, and was replaced by Massey. Blake subsequently joined his third production of Wicked, this time in Asia, replacing David Harris as Fiyero beginning August 7 in Seoul, South Korea.

After leaving Wicked, Blake joined the Broadway cast of Matilda the Musical in the roles of the Escapologist, Sergei, and the Party Entertainer. He then took over the role of Tommy DeVito in the Broadway production of Jersey Boys beginning January 9, 2014.

Blake starred as Lorenzo in the musical adaptation of A Bronx Tale on Broadway at the Longacre Theatre. The musical opened officially on December 1, 2016 and closed on August 5, 2018.

== Stage credits ==
Year	Title	Role	Venue	Ref.
1984	A Broadway Baby	Performer	Regional, Goodspeed Musicals	
1987	Teddy & Alice	Archie Roosevelt	Broadway, Minskoff Theatre	
1988	Macbeth	MacDuff's Son	Broadway, Mark Hellinger Theatre	
1989	Prince of Central Park	Jay-Jay	Broadway, Belasco Theatre	
1993-1995	The Sound of Music	Rolf Gruber	U.S. National Tour	
1997	Rent	Roger Davis (Alternate)	Broadway, Nederlander Theatre	
1998	Footloose	Chuck Cranston	U.S. National Tour	
1999	Saturday Night Fever	Gus	Broadway, Minskoff Theatre	
2001-2002	Saturday Night Fever	Gus	U.S. National Tour	
2003	Aida	Radames (Replacement)	Broadway, Palace Theatre	
2004	Hairspray	Link Larkin (Replacement)	Broadway, Neil Simon Theatre	
2006	The Wedding Singer	Greg Guglia	Broadway, Al Hirschfeld Theatre	
2007	Legally Blonde	Warner Huntington III	Broadway, Palace Theatre	
2008-2011	Wicked	Fiyero (Replacement)	U.S. National Tour	
2011	Wicked	Fiyero (Replacement)	Broadway, Gershwin Theatre	
2013	Feather	Eli	Off-Broadway, Pershing Square Signature Center	
2013	Matilda The Musical	Ensemble (Replacement)	Broadway, Shubert Theatre	
2014	Jersey Boys	Tommy Devito (Replacement)	Broadway, August Wilson Theatre	
2015	Jersey Boys	Tommy Devito (Replacement)	Broadway, August Wilson Theatre	
2016	A Bronx Tale	Lorenzo	Regional, Paper Mill Playhouse	
2016	A Bronx Tale	Lorenzo	Broadway, Longacre Theatre	
2018	A Bronx Tale	Lorenzo	U.S. National Tour	
