= Preview (theatre) =

Performance before official opening

Previews are a set of public performances of a theatrical presentation that precede its official opening, known as the press night. The purpose of previews is to allow the director and crew to identify problems and opportunities for improvement that were not found during rehearsals and to make adjustments before critics are invited to attend. The duration of the preview period varies, and ticket prices may be reduced.

Records for Broadway productions independently list a work's previews and performances. For example, the 2007 Broadway production of A Bronx Tale had 18 previews and 111 performances. The subsequent musical version of that play had 28 previews and 700 performances from late 2016 to 2018.

The term can also be used to describe an exhibition of a film to evaluate an audience's reaction and make possible changes before its official release. (This is different from a "trailer", a short advertisement for a finished film.)

== Sources ==
- "Theatre 101: A Users Guide to Going to the Theatre". Theatre Development Fund website.
