= Todd McFarlane's Spawn =

American adult animated superhero television series

- Genre: Drama; Horror; Neo-noir; Science fantasy; Superhero; Thriller
- Created by: Todd McFarlane
- Based on: Spawn by Todd McFarlane
- Developed by: Alan B. McElroy
- Voices of: Keith David; Richard Dysart; Michael Nicolosi; James Hanes; Dominique Jennings; James Keane; John Rafter Lee; Victor Love; Michael McShane; Kath Soucie
- Narrated by: Richard Dysart
- Theme music composer: Shirley Walker
- Composers: Shirley Walker; J. Peter Robinson
- Country of origin: United States
- Original language: English
- No. of seasons: 3
- No. of episodes: 18

Production
- Executive producer: Todd McFarlane
- Producers: Catherine Winder; John Kafka
- Running time: 26–30 minutes (episodes); 180 minutes (films)
- Production companies: HBO Animation; Todd McFarlane Entertainment

Original release
- Network: HBO
- Release: May 16, 1997 – May 28, 1999

Todd McFarlane's Spawn, also known as Spawn: The Animated Series or simply Spawn, is an American adult animated superhero horror television series that aired on HBO from 1997 through 1999 and reran on Cartoon Network's Toonami programming block in Japan. It is the first of two adult animated series (alongside Spicy City) to have premiered on HBO in 1997. Both were produced by their short-lived animation division, with Todd McFarlane's Spawn being a co-production with Todd McFarlane Entertainment.

It has also been released on DVD as a film series. The show is based on the character Spawn from Image Comics, and won an Emmy Award in 1999 for Outstanding Animation Program (Longer Than One Hour).

== Plot ==
The series revolves around the story of former Marine Force Recon Lieutenant Colonel Al Simmons, who worked as a government assassin in covert black ops. He was betrayed and killed by a man whom he believed to be his close friend (the man, later to be revealed as Chapel, burned him alive with a flamethrower during a mission). Upon his death, Simmons vowed revenge on Chapel and hoped that he would one day return to his beloved wife Wanda.

Because of his life as an assassin, Simmons' soul goes to Hell. In order to accomplish his vow, he makes a pact with the devil Malebolgia (who was the overlord on the eighth plane of Hell). The pact was a simple one: Simmons would become a soldier in Malebolgia's army (known as a "Hellspawn" or "Spawn" for short) in return for the ability to walk the earth once again in order to see Wanda. However, Simmons was tricked by Malebolgia: his body was not returned to him and he is returned to Earth five years after his death. He had been given a different body which was a festering, pungently cadaverous, maggot-ridden walking corpse that had a massive living red cape attached to it. Because his new body had been rotten for some time and was in an advanced state of decay, his face had become heavily malformed, to the point that he barely appeared human, which led to Simmons donning a mask in order to cover its grotesque appearance.

Upon his return to "life", Spawn seeks out Wanda, who had apparently got over the grief of having lost Al and married another man, Al's best friend Terry Fitzgerald with whom she had had a daughter, Cyan. Terry, a respectable man, works as an analyst for a man named Jason Wynn. Wynn is a powerbroker in the CIA and secretly a black market arms dealer, amongst other things (such as the head of secret government organizations within the NSA and National Security Council). Wynn is revealed to be the man responsible for the death of Al Simmons due to a disagreement that the two had between each other concerning their "work". Jason's actions would also prove dangerous to the lives of Terry, Wanda, and their daughter as well. Realizing that he is no longer the man in Wanda's life, Al swears to protect her and her new family.

The series depicts Spawn nesting in the dark alleyways, killing any who invade his newfound territory. Rejecting these actions as unworthy of Spawn's time and power, Malebolgia then dispatches another of his minions (a demonic creature known as the Violator that assumes the form of a short, overweight clown) to try to persuade Spawn to commit acts of violence and savagery in the name of Hell.

Spawn struggles to fight the lure of evil, as well as seeking to escape being hunted by not only the forces of Hell, but by assailants from Heaven, who have a need to destroy the Hellspawns in order to cripple the forces of Hell so that they do not gain an edge in the escalating war between the two spiritual hosts. As the war intensifies, the line between the forces of good and evil become increasingly blurry. Spawn finds help along the way in the form of a disheveled old man named Cogliostro who was once a Hellspawn that overcame the demonic powers resting within, amongst a number of other characters.

In the last episodes of the series, Spawn learns how to shapeshift and, appearing as Terry, has sex with Wanda, impregnating her. It is revealed that there is a prophecy that the child of a Hellspawn will play the deciding factor in Armageddon, and may be the real reason Spawn was allowed to return to Earth.

== Episodes ==
=== Todd McFarlane's Spawn ===
No. overall	No. in season	Title	Directed by	Written by	Original release date
1	1	"Burning Visions"	Eric Radomski	Alan B. McElroy	May 16, 1997
Al Simmons returns from the grave, lost and bewildered at how his wife Wanda is now married to his best friend Terry Fitzgerald. He is followed by an evil demon in the form of a clown, called the Violator, who reveals that Al has been dead for five years and is now a Hellspawn. Meanwhile, Jason Wynn and Tony Twist are trying to figure out how to move out their illegal arms.
2	2	"Evil Intent"	John Hays	Alan B. McElroy	May 23, 1997
Tormented by the thought that he cannot be with his wife, Spawn is annoyed by the Violator's efforts to drive him into violence and evil in the name of Hell. He eventually engages in a brawl with the demon in his true form.
3	3	"No Rest, No Peace"	Eric Radomski	Alan B. McElroy	May 30, 1997
When Tony Twist's hired cyborg hitman, Overkill, fails to eliminate Spawn, Wynn sends in Jess Chapel to get the job done.
4	4	"Dominoes"	John Hays	Alan B. McElroy	June 6, 1997
Police detectives Sam Burke and Twitch Williams begin trailing the sadistic child-killer known as Billy Kincaid, who poses as an ice cream man. Wanda learns of some new evidence that will help her client be cleared of his charges.
5	5	"Souls in the Balance"	Eric Radomski	Gary Hardwick	June 16, 1997
Spawn must deal with a crazed priest, a person who does not die after a snipe shot. Meanwhile, the Violator tips off the location of Wanda and Terry's sweet daughter, Cyan, to Kincaid.
6	6	"End Games"	Eric Radomski	Alan B. McElroy	June 30, 1997
Spawn saves Cyan from Kincaid and returns her to her parents, along with the wedding ring that Al Simmons was buried with. Frustrated that Spawn did not kill Kincaid, the Violator finishes the job himself and promises to continue pursuing the Hellspawn.

=== Todd McFarlane's Spawn 2 ===
No. overall	No. in season	Title	Directed by	Written by	Original release date
7	1	"Home, Bitter Home"	Jennifer Yuh Nelson	Larry Brody, John Shirley, John Leekley & Rebekah Bradford	May 15, 1998
Chapel steps onto Spawn's territory, and the two have an encounter that shakes the alleyways.
8	2	"Access Denied"	Tom Nelson	Larry Brody, John Shirley, John Leekley & Rebekah Bradford	May 22, 1998
After Terry discovers more than he should about shipping discrepancies, Wynn orders a hit on his life. Spawn intervenes, wanting to be the one to kill Terry, but after learning that Terry did not steal Wanda from him like he had originally thought, Spawn fights off Terry's attackers.
9	3	"Colors of Blood"	Mike Vosburg	Larry Brody, John Shirley & Victor Bumbalo	May 29, 1998
Unable to locate Terry after his hitmen's failure, Wynn turns to Wanda. Spawn takes care of some local drug dealers that are killing the homeless.
10	4	"Send in the KKKlowns"	Jennifer Yuh Nelson	John Leekley & Gerard Brown	June 5, 1998
A man claiming to be doing "the Lord's work" is killing off Black people, but finds that the one he captured, Terry Fitzgerald, is more than he can handle. Spawn attempts to confront Wanda, but only frightens her in the process.
11	5	"Death Blow"	Tom Nelson	John Leekley, Rebekah Bradford & Gerard Brown	June 12, 1998
Lisa Wu begins looking into the recent Rat City alley murders and Spawn visits Wanda at home.
12	6	"Hellzapoppin"	Mike Vosburg	John Leekley, Rebekah Bradford & Gerard Brown	June 19, 1998
As Wynn watches the news, he receives a message from Clown and the channel goes back on. Realizing that Wynn had sent people to kill both Cyan and Wanda, Spawn threatens to kill Wynn if he does not back off.

=== Todd McFarlane's Spawn 3: The Ultimate Battle ===
No. overall	No. in season	Title	Directed by	Written by	Original release date
13	1	"A Made Guy"	Jennifer Yuh Nelson	John Leekley	May 23, 1999
Spawn is tormented by nightmares of a Medieval Black Knight hunting him and demanding that he acknowledge which master he serves. Also, Frankie must choose between good and evil.
14	2	"Twitch Is Down"	Tom Nelson	John Leekley	May 24, 1999
Officer Twitch Williams investigates the alley murders and confronts Spawn. After Twitch learns too much about the alley murders and Jason Wynn, Wynn sends the dirty Police Chief Banks out to kill Twitch in order to keep him silenced.
15	3	"Seed of the Hellspawn"	Mike Vosburg	John Leekley	May 25, 1999
Spawn learns to use his shroud to take on the forms of others. Knowing that returning as Al would worry Wanda too much, Spawn disguises himself as Terry and makes love to his wife one last time. Meanwhile, Sam is watching Twitch get hospitalized. Banks attempts to frame Spawn as Twitch's shooter.
16	4	"Hunter's Moon"	Jennifer Yuh Nelson	John Leekley	May 26, 1999
Spawn befriends a vampire named Lilly, but when she attacks him and reveals that she was sent by Heaven to kill him, he wastes no time in frying her with sunlight. Lisa Wu, now revealed to Spawn as Jade—a hunter also sent by Heaven to kill Hellspawn—allows him to re-heal himself after his fight with Lilly.
17	5	"Chasing the Serpent"	Chuck Patton	Rebekah Bradford	May 27, 1999
Spawn, aided by Jade, frees Terry Fitzgerald and Major Forsberg from Jason Wynn's opium prison.
18	6	"Prophecy"	Brad Rader	John Leekley	May 28, 1999
Jade realises Spawn is not what she thought and decides to spare him, and Heaven responds by placing a bounty upon Jade. She is mortally wounded by the new hunters and in the end, she avoids disgrace and is granted a spot in Heaven by having Spawn give her a warrior's death. Meanwhile, Sam and Twitch confront the Chief in the subway, and secure a confession before the last train leaves. "I want my humanity back" was all that Spawn said before the closing credits roll.

== Voice cast ==
- Keith David as Lieutenant Colonel Al Simmons / Spawn
- Richard Dysart as Nicholas Cogliostro
- Dominique Jennings as Wanda Blake
- John Rafter Lee as Jason Wynn
- Michael Nicolosi as Clown (human form)
- James Hanes as Violator (demoniac form), Overkill
- Jennifer Jason Leigh as Lilly
- Victor Love as Terry Fitzgerald (episodes 1–12), Bobby (episodes 1–12)
- Michael Beach as Terry Fitzgerald (episodes 15–17), Bobby (episodes 15–17), and additional voices
- Kath Soucie as Cyan Fitzgerald and additional voices
- James Keane as Antonio "Tony Twist" Twistelli, Detective Sam Burke
- Michael McShane as Detective Maximilian "Twitch" Williams, Gareb
- Denise Poirier as Merrick, Bounty Hunter, Angela
- Ronny Cox as Billy Kincaid, Senator Scott McMillan
- Victor Brandt as Chief Louis Banks
- Ming-Na Wen as Lisa Wu / Jade
- Ruben Santiago-Hudson as Jess Chapel
- Robert Forster as Major Forseberg
- James Hong as Gen Soon / Zhang Lao
- Michael Yama as Cain and additional voices
- Debbi Morgan as Granny Blake
- Eric Roberts as Petey

== Production ==
=== Early development ===
When HBO first approached McFarlane to do an animated series, he had already had several discussions with networks. These other networks were interested in doing a Spawn animated series since they had seen that Spawn was the number one comic book series in the United States at that time. McFarlane said that since the comic had started selling more than kid-friendly titles such as Spider-Man, the network executives thought that the show would be able to work as a Saturday-morning cartoon. McFarlane recalled in 1997, "I know when I had the conversations with them, they hadn't actually seen the product. Because if they had and had done their homework, then they would see there's no way this guy is meant to be translated onto something that is for an audience that's under the age of 12." Regarding his initial meeting with HBO executives for the project, McFarlane recalled, "I wanted to ask one question... can I say the word, "fuck?" If they let me do that, there's 100 other things I could get away with, too." McFarlane was more direct in his meeting with HBO since he was tired of having the same types of conversations with network executives. He further remarked in 1997 that, "people have such a stereotype about animation — they immediately think cartoons and Disney. They're not used to seeing Silence of the Lambs, The Godfather and Seven all in one cartoon, but that's what they're getting." McFarlane believed that since HBO was a cable network, the audience would mostly be over 16 and a "young college crowd", which aligned well with the core demographic Spawn was aimed at.

=== Development of the first season ===
After greenlighting the show, HBO granted it a six million dollar budget for the six episode first season. McFarlane had approached his deal with HBO the same way he dealt with work in the comics industry, insisting on creative control and a sizable share of profits generated by his vision. Work on the series occurred in Los Angeles, although McFarlane lived in Phoenix at the time. McFarlane stated in a 2021 interview: "I was flying into Century City every week while we were doing that, for three years." The series was the first project of HBO Animation, a newly created division of HBO which was intended to focus on adult animation during its first few years, before eventually branching out into more family-friendly entertainment. They co-produced the series with Todd McFarlane Entertainment, and both company logos appear in the end credits. While work on the first season was occurring, HBO Animation also started simultaneously producing Spicy City, an anthology series by Ralph Bakshi, one of the pioneers of adult animation. HBO Animation was led by Catherine Winder, and in an interview from when the first season was in production, Winder claimed HBO decided to choose Spawn as their first animated project since they were drawn to the visuals and the storyline of the comics. She said that "it's very sophisticated and dramatic and there's a wonderful love story underlying the whole property", adding that the show they were creating was "something you've never seen before in animated programming." She noted in this interview that the show could be comparable to Japanese anime, but still considered it to be distinct from that style. According to McFarlane, one of his objectives was to break away from the traditional mold of American animation, and to bring sensibilities from other countries, including not just Japanese anime, but also European animation. In 1997, McFarlane that the show's heavy usage of black colors and dark shadows was missing from many American cartoons, and he also considered the show's adult-oriented nature to be similar to anime.

The score and opening sequence theme was handled by Shirley Walker, who had earlier composed background music for the Warner Bros. Animation series Batman: The Animated Series. Other former production crew from Batman: The Animated Series also worked on the show, including director Frank Paur (who was involved with the third season) and producer/director Eric Radomski. Warner Bros. Animation (and its namesake live-action television and film studios) were divisions of Time Warner, as was HBO. Radomski was the one who approached Walker to compose for the show, and he had long wanted to pursue darker, more adult-oriented animation, saying "knowing that HBO was definitely interested in pushing their shows to an R-rating was music to my ears." He believed that he could build on the success and audience he had found producing Batman: The Animated Series, which had a mature tone despite airing as a Saturday-morning cartoon. After leaving Batman: The Animated Series, he had started working on the comedic Saturday-morning cartoon Freakazoid!, which was also produced by Warner Bros. Animation, and said he was "very anxious" to get out of the studio. Radomski and his crew of animators were hired roughly four months into the production of Spawn, and the hiring came after HBO and McFarlane had issues with a Californian off-site animation studio. Radomski said the work of this studio "wasn't up to Todd's standards". HBO decided to bring the animation work in-house rather than subcontracting it to another Californian studio, which is what they were originally doing during the first four months of development.

Prior to taking on the project, Radomski had never heard of Spawn. Further, most of the scripts for the first season had already been written before he arrived, with the head writer for these episodes being Spawn comic collaborator Alan B. McElroy. Catherine Winder gave Radomski some of the early Spawn comics to get him acquainted with the story, and he found McFarlane's writing in them to be "kind of sophomoric". Radomski also felt that some of the foul language and violence from the scripts for the first season were "gratuitous and unnecessarily repetitive", but he supported the overall level of sophistication and maturity in the end product. Throughout the production, Radomski said he and others tried to convey to McFarlane how important it was to focus on drama-based elements of the story, with Radomski believing that McFarlane emphasized action over this in the comics. Radomski said, "we wanted to get to the romance story; it's a guy who lost his life, wants to get back to his wife and he's got a kid. Can't ask for better drama than that. It was continually an education process to say, 'Look, Spawn doesn't get mad and put his fist through the wall, he takes a moment here and there.' That was really important to convey to Todd." Radomski had served as an executive producer on Batman: The Animated Series, despite also being an animator, and he would continue to serve this duel role on Spawn. At that time, it was uncommon for animators to have creative influence over the shows they were working on. While Batman: The Animated Series featured traditional movie orchestra-type music, Radomski requested that Shirley Walker give the series a more organic and subtle electronic soundtrack, with only minimal usage of orchestral sounds. J. Peter Robinson composed the score for the third and final season.

The series was animated in South Korea, which is a common practice in American animation. Koko Enterprises, the South Korean studio animating Spwan, was simultaneously doing several family friendly cartoons while working on Spawn; McFarlane likened the company's other cartoons to Care Bears. He noted that it was difficult for the studio to alternate family-friendly cartoons and Spawn, and that there were issues with how they were animating blood. McFarlane described the blood as sometimes looking more like honey, and said that they would have to re-do it when it came out like this. Koko Enterprises's animators were also used to "putting color on everything", and didn't understand why the show's producers wanted so many shadows and dark colors. According to McFarlane, it took a long time for the studio to understand that they were intentionally trying to obscure some of the details of the animation by having all the dark colors. McFarlane had similar issues when he was first working in the toy industry, since manufacturers thought adding dark ink washes to the toys made them look "old and dingy" rather than "new and plastic". The opening sequence was animated by Japanese studio Madhouse, and they would later become involved with the animation of the second season's episodes.

The show's plot in the first season is mostly faithful to the comics. However, the series has been considered as more grounded in reality when compared to the comics, which leaned heavily towards fantasy elements like more of a typical comic book story. McFarlane said the goal with the show was to make Spawn himself the main supernatural element, and everything around him more "urban" and "down to earth". The first episode begins with gangsters shooting a man to death, as Spawn watches on. Spawn retaliates by killing the gangsters. Another man then gets accidentally set on fire, after having earlier been doused in gasoline by the gangsters, with his charred corpse later being visible. The violent beginning was intentional, with McFarlane saying "we wanted to make a statement right at the very beginning. I didn't want Martha and Herman. you know, the 50 year old couple, to turn on the TV set and watch it. I needed them to get really offended real quick and turn off the TV. The audience we were going for, I needed them to watch the show and say at midnight with one of their buddies, 'did I just see a cartoon guy just say the word shit, and put a gun in a guy's mouth?'. McFarlane added that people would naturally either be offended by the violence or view it as something that was "really cool". Later on in the first episode, the mobsters' boss, Tony Twist, finds out about the deaths, and in this scene Twist is only wearing a pink thong. There are two other near naked women in his room, whose breasts are exposed, and that are engaging in sexual foreplay with each other. As the first season progressed, there would go on to be more shots of bare naked breasts, with most of the nudity occurring in scenes with Twist. McFarlane believed the nudity was similar to the violence, in that it was "either going to shock or not be much of a problem to people." He said, "it's another one of those taboos that most people aren't used to seeing, either if ever, in animation, because we've been raised on cute, little cuddly stuff and Saturday-morning cartoons." McFarlane added that, "these are the type of things that have shock value, but they're not there for that; we're dealing with a head mafia guy, he's a guy who yields a lot of power but he likes to be promiscuous and he's a bit of a ladies man." In the third episode, there was also a depiction of sexual intercourse. The character Chapel, (who assassinated Al Simmons before he became Spawn) goes to a nude strip club in this episode and picks up a dancer there, and later has sex in a bedroom with her, but the sex is continually interrupted by flashbacks Chapel is having.

A child killer and pedophile character named Billy Kincaid, who appeared in one of the comic's most controversial issues, is introduced in the second episode. In his opening scene he is luring a little girl from a crowd of children to his ice cream truck, and her body is later dumped in the alley which Spawn frequents. Kincaid ends up kidnapping Spawn's four-year-old daughter towards the end of the first season, and there is a scene which depicts her tied up and blindfolded in a dark room with candles. The first kidnapping didn't show any scenes of the murdered girl being held in Kincaid's house, unlike with when Kincaid kidnapped Spawn's daughter. While Kincaid only appeared in a single issue of the comics before being killed, in the animated series his story arc figures prominently throughout the first season. Kincaid was given a larger role than in the comics by being re-written as the son of a senator, with the senator using his political clout to cover up the crimes. McFarlane said a reason they used Kincaid for the animated series was since he fit with its theme of having Spawn mainly surrounded by urban, non-supernatural characters. He acknowledged that for some people Kincaid's story was "tough subject matter to deal with", and said it could be argued they were "going a little overboard" by including him, but he added that they "just wanted to try and see if we could come up with ultimately a drama, and when we're done writing the drama, that we then animated it, and don't look at it as a cartoon first, but we look at it as a drama that happens to be animated." Towards the end of the second episode, a cyborg assassinator from the comics named Overkill is hired by Tony Twist, and he battles Spawn in the following episode.^{[note1]} While searching for Spawn, there is a graphic moment in which he pulls on one of the arms of the homeless people in Spawn's alley, and it breaks off. McFarlane was pleased with this particular part. There were debates amongst the production crew as to whether they should include a character like Overkill, since they didn't want to lean too heavily into the fantasy elements of the comics. At the beginning of several scenes, a countdown clock is shown which depicts how much energy Spawn has left until he has to return to hell, since every time Spawn uses his powers he gets closer to being returned to hell. McFarlane noted that the countdown clock confused some viewers who weren't familiar with the comics.

The series included live-action introductions by McFarlane. VHS and DVD releases which packaged the show's episodes individually included the introductions, but they are removed from releases which present the seasons in a singular movie format. The introductions for the first season were shot inside a location which resembles the top floor of a brick wall castle. At the start of these introductions, McFarlane is in the process of inking a Spawn comic, and he then proceeds to ask rhetorical questions to the viewer, before introducing the episodes. The first season introductions (excluding the pilot) are followed by short clips recapping the previous episodes, and it then cuts back to McFarlane saying to the viewer, "and now Spawn, so turn off your lights." Following this line from McFarlane, the opening sequence plays. The opening sequence for the first season was entirely animated, whereas the second and third seasons mixed in live-action shots of Spawn, and live-action shots of skeletons, tribal masks and an abandoned Sanatorium-like building. For the second and third seasons, McFarlane's introductions come after the opening sequence, and they have him inside a more realistic looking basement location, which houses some of the live-action props from the opening sequence. The introductions for all three seasons were done in a similar manner to R. L. Stine's intros for the 1995-98 Goosebumps series, which also featured the series author introducing the episodes in basement/dungeon-like locations. Spawn's first season live-action introductions were filmed by future Hollywood director Doug Liman, who at the time was a roommate with one of the HBO executives.

The first season aired on the midnight slot on HBO, following Dennis Miller Live. The season concluded on HBO on June 20, 1997, a little over a month after it had begun airing. Prior to the premiere of the first season, the show was being promoted alongside Spicy City. However, Spicy City would end up premiering on HBO in July 1997, after Spawn's first season had already completed airing. It was cancelled after only a month on the air.

=== Comparisons between the 1997 live-action film ===
At the beginning of August 1997, a live-action Spawn film was released to theaters. It was a co-production between Todd McFarlane Entertainment and New Line Cinema, which coincidentally was owned by Time Warner, the same parent company of HBO. The live-action film was noted for having a more mainstream tone than the animated series, as McFarlane and the producers had to do it as a PG-13 rated film (although a slightly different R rated cut would eventually be released on home video as well). The film omits several characters from the comics who were present in the first season of the animated series, including Billy Kincaid, Overkill and Tony Twist. Another change was the race of Terry Fitzgerald, who is depicted as black in the comics and animated series. He was revised to being white in the film, since New Line didn't want there to be too many African American characters; they thought this would lead to it being perceived as a film primarily aimed at that demographic. The film also replaced the black male assassin character Chapel, who appeared in the comics and all three seasons of the animated series. He was replaced with a white female assassin character named Jessica Priest, that was created specifically for the film. The villainous character Clown from the comics is included in both the film and the three seasons of the animated series. He has more sexually perverse dialogue in the animated series, and at one point in the first season is masturbating in front of Spawn while talking about his wife Wanda. In both the film and the first season of the animated series, he has a battle with Spawn after transforming into his demonic Violator form. However, in the animated version of this scene, the transformation is much more graphic, with his skin tearing open and blood seeping out as he transforms.

Alan B. McElroy was simultaneously working as the head writer on the first season and as one of the writers on the film. McElroy subsequently claimed in 2017 that he was able to write freely and in his own voice on the show, dropping in ideas he was unable to add to the film. He said, "often when people come up to me and say they weren't happy with the movie, I tell them to check out season one of Spawn: The Animated Series."

=== Development of later seasons ===
In the summer of 1997, work on a second season of episodes began, which would begin airing in May of the following year. As work on the second season was starting, it was confirmed in late June 1997 that a deal had been struck with HBO for the future writing of a third season of episodes. While the second season was in production, McFarlane got hired to direct the animated music video for the song "Do the Evolution", from Pearl Jam's fifth album Yield. The video was done in the same style as the Spawn animated series, and McFarlane was contacted to work on it by the band's lead singer Eddie Vedder, who saw the show on HBO in 1997. Vedder had recorded some of the episodes onto a VHS, and later used the Avid video editing software to put the music of "Do the Evolution" onto scenes from Spawn. He sent this tape to McFarlane as a way of showing him what he wanted the "Do the Evolution" video to be like. Like with the first season of Spawn, the final stage of animation for "Do the Evolution" was done in South Korea.

When the second season of Spawn shifted to having animation done in Japan with Madhouse, it took on more of an anime-influenced look. Radomski said he thought that in the second season of Spawn, the animation had markedly improved, while CBR described it as the "most visually appealing season" in 2017. Radomski further said that the storylines were more believable and realistic in the second season, and that it was the closest to what he had intended for the show to be like. At the end of the first season, McElroy had departed the show, leaving it without a strong authorial voice in the early stages of the second season's production. HBO didn't like the original scripts they saw for the second season, and ordered rewrites after some animation had already been turned in. After these issues with HBO, McFarlane called in two writers he knew, John Leekley and Rebekah Bradford, to work on the second season of the show. Leekley not only wrote many of the scripts, but also directed the live-action parts of the show. He had previously worked in made-for-TV drama movies, and had no experience in writing animation. McFarlane claimed to Variety in November 1997 that they were intentionally avoiding animation writers, saying "most animation writers write juvenile stories because the majority of work is for kids shows. So a writer who used to write for DuckTales can't write the drama that this show needs. They want to, but their minds are atrophied. They're caught up in the expectations of animation." In 2017, CBR described Leekley's made-for-TV movie background as giving the second season a "strange tone". In the second season, the overall storytelling approach also shifted away from interconnected stories like in the first season. The second season's episodes had a more self-contained style, with McFarlane adding that they had some "soap opera" thrown in as well.

On October 31, 1997, St. Louis Blues hockey player Tony Twist filed a successful, 10 year long lawsuit against HBO and Todd McFarlane Entertainment, after finding out that the mob boss character from the first season was named after him. Twist initially heard about this character through his mother, and then viewed the show. He stated, "I'm in pink thong underwear, smoking a cigar, ordering the kidnapping of a child while two women are naked on the couch making love to each other. I obviously didn't want any part of that. Even if I was a good guy I wouldn't have participated. You've got kids being kidnapped, you've got nudity, you've got police raping women. It's nothing I want to be affiliated with." As a result of the lawsuit, Twist's character was never used past the first season of the animated series, and when early issues of the Spawn comics were reprinted, the name of Tony Twist's character was changed to "Vito Gravano". However, no changes were made to the episodes of Spawn where Twist appeared. A female warrior character named Angela was also the subject of a lawsuit between McFarlane and comic writer Neil Gaiman, who wrote her original issue of Spawn in 1993. This lawsuit eventually prevented McFarlane from using the character. She only had a brief appearance in the fourth episode of the first season, but when the show was in production there were not any legal issues over the rights to this character, and the writers were considering having her come back to the show, before it got cancelled.

With the third season, there was another shift with how the animation was being done. Madhouse was no longer involved with the overseas animation during this season, and director Frank Paur and his crew also got hired to do pre-overseas animation work. Radomski said he had worked on the third season, but that he took his name off the credits since he was unhappy with HBO. He said that going into the third season, there were internal disagreements regarding how Spawn should be made, and that some at the company were trying to "dismantle" the previous processes that were in place for the show. The third season is often viewed as the weakest of the series, and the animation started getting rushed as it progressed. After getting hired by McFarlane in the second season, John Leekley had continued to serve as a head writer and showrunner for the third season. Radomski said that with the third season, the show was starting to veer too heavily into fantasy elements, such as by frequently using heaven and hell as the settings for stories. The series ended in May 1999 following the conclusion of the third season on HBO. A fourth season was originally planned, but never came to fruition. Leekley later revealed some of the ideas for a scrapped fourth season. These involved the return of Angela looking to avenge the death of Jade who was her previous lover, several one time characters returning to have larger roles, a gang war spiraling out of control led by the ruthless Barrabas, Spawn befriending a runaway teenage girl named Kristen with a case of pyrophobia, a now disfigured Wynn looking for redemption, Chapel breaking out of an asylum and winding up a pawn for Angela, Merrick having to team up with Twitch to save her daughter, and most of the characters coming to the realization of Spawn's identity. Radomski claimed if the series had entered into a fourth season, it likely would have continued to focus heavily on fantasy elements and "individual hero vs. villain scenarios", in contrast to the first two seasons.

== Reception ==
Some critics believe that the series was overshadowed by the poorly received film adaptation of Spawn, which also debuted in the summer of 1997, and had more of a promotional push behind it. It has achieved a small but loyal cult following who praise the animation, writing, voice acting, music, and dark tone, whereas the graphic violence and intentional unresolved cliffhanger has attracted criticism. Variety stated in July 1997 that "It's as dark and complex as anything HBO has attempted in the live-action arena. And visually, it's quite the stunner. HBO wanted different, and it surely got it." A more mixed review came from The Dallas Morning News in June 1997, who questioned why anyone would "want to subject themselves to such a relentlessly grim, gruesome dehumanizing experience." The Tampa Bay Times remarked in 1997 that the first three episodes "unfold in a disjointed, abstract style that owes as much to the animated movie Heavy Metal as the Batman trilogy." Billboard's Eileen Fitzpatrick stated in June 1997 that with the series, HBO were "attempting to capitalize on the growing market for adult-oriented animation now mainly limited to Japanese cartoons." In his 1997 review of the pilot episode, Charles Simon of the Los Angeles Times said the show was similar to violent anime, and labelled a scene where Spawn wrestles his rotting corpse as "gross". He added that, "media watchdog groups are going to have conniptions when they get a load of the show's extreme violence — not to mention the scenes of smoking, drinking, profanity, nudity, sex and urination."

In July 1997, CMJ described it as a more adult version of Batman: The Animated Series, and wrote "97 is the summer of Spawn. A live-action, big screen version of the mega-selling comic will be hitting theaters in August, but it's HBO's animated Todd McFarlane's Spawn that has 'cult classic' written all over it." They added that, "it's violent, making sense isn't always a priority and women are basically sexual currency, but Spawn is a dark, twisted ride you'll want to take more than once." In September 1997, Martha Day of Animation World Network compared it to other mature cable cartoons from that year, including Spicy City and South Park, writing "cable's version of animation for adults just keeps getting stranger and stranger." In December 1997, Gary Susman of The Boston Phoenix described 1997 as being a year where "animation grows up", writing that "Fox's King of the Hill, Comedy Central's South Park, HBO's Spawn and Spicy City, and even MTV's Daria were clearly not for the tots."

=== Retrospective response ===
In his 2008 book The Encyclopedia of Superheroes on Film and Television, John Kenneth Muir said it and shows like Batman: The Animated Series were part of a "new generation" of superhero shows in the 1990s. He said these shows proved that "adults would stay tuned [to cartoons] if the writing was good enough", but noted that Spawn was more "squarely aimed at adults, with the sex and violence quotient raised considerably." In a 2022 article on the 25th anniversary of the live-action film, Inverse reflected that, "HBO's Spawn animated series, which also launched in 1997, proved to be a far better adaptation overall. It's a bonafide classic, whereas the live-action film was relegated to cult classic status." DVDTalk similarly wrote in 2007 that the movie was "decidedly watered down to make it to a mainstream audience", adding that the show contained "the kind of edge that the live action movie was unable to present". Horror website Bloody Disgusting stated in 2018 that it was "still the character's best incarnation." In 2017, CBR praised the show's music, stating "[Shirley] Walker's work on Spawn takes the gothic elements of her Batman: The Animated Series compositions to an even darker place" and that "some of the more 'adult' elements of the series were dismissed as juvenile attempts at maturity, but the score isn't one of them. It's moody beyond belief, the perfect musical companion for the bleakness of the series."

=== Legacy ===
Todd McFarlane's Spawn was ranked 5th on IGN's list of "The Greatest Comic Book Cartoons of All Time", and 23rd on IGN's list of "Top 25 Primetime Animated Series of All Time" (despite the fact the show was aired at midnight on HBO). IGN also placed it 65th on a list of the "Top 100 Animated Series". In 2011, Complex ranked it 8th on their list of "The 25 Most Underrated Animated TV Shows of All Time". Gamesradar placed it 22nd on their list of "The 32 Greatest Animated TV Shows of All Time" in 2024.

Series producer Eric Radomski reflected in a retrospective interview that "Spawn TAS was a personal triumph for me. Very rarely do artists get the opportunity to have as much uncensored creative freedom as I did at HBO on Spawn." In 2023, Todd McFarlane said he was pleased with Keith David's voice work as Spawn in the series, and has "trouble hearing anyone else in the role".

A sequel series titled Spawn: The Animation was in development in 2004 and was set to be released in 2007 with Keith David reprising his role, but due to McFarlane wanting to push the animation further, the project ended up in production limbo until it was quietly cancelled. Keith David would go on to reprise Spawn as a guest character for Mortal Kombat 11 in 2019.

== Home media ==
During the 1990s and early 2000s, all three seasons were released separately on DVD and VHS. These releases edited the seasons into three two-hour long movies, under the titles Todd McFarlane's Spawn, Todd McFarlane's Spawn 2, and Todd McFarlane's Spawn 3: The Ultimate Battle. Around this time, the episodic HBO broadcast version was also released on VHS; however these releases only included two episodes per VHS. The two-hour movie version of the first season was first released to VHS in August 1997. During the initial month of release, there were issues with the shipments, with one retail outlet still having 75% of their stock stuck in a UPS warehouse during that month. In September 1997 and September 1998, the first two seasons were released on LaserDisc in the two-hour movie format. The LaserDisc release of the first two seasons included bonus features created specifically for that release, such as an audio commentary track with Todd McFarlane and a "making of" feature with Eric Radomski. The third season was never released on LaserDisc, presumably due to the waning popularity of the format, which was discontinued in the United States in 2000.

When the show's first and second seasons were released on VHS they were came in two differently rated formats. The first format was called the "Uncut Collector's Edition", which is the version that was shown on TV and held a TV-MA rating, and the other was an edited version called the "Special Edited Edition" which held a PG-13 rating by toning down the violence and sexual content.

In 2005, the first season movie was released in the UMD format for Sony's PSP handheld video game system, but the other two movies were not. On July 24, 2007, HBO Video released a 4-disc 10th-anniversary signature collector's edition on DVD with all 18 episodes and multiple new bonus features.

On July 5, 2016, HBO added all three seasons to its streaming services, HBO GO and HBO NOW. It's also available on HBO Max as of March 2026. The version on streaming services is the episodic broadcast version with McFarlane's live-action intros.

== See also ==
- Spawn (character)
- Spawn (film)

== Notes ==
- The character's name has also been spelt "Overt-kill" in other media. In the animated series, the written name appears as "Overkill".
