= John Leekley =

American writer, director and producer

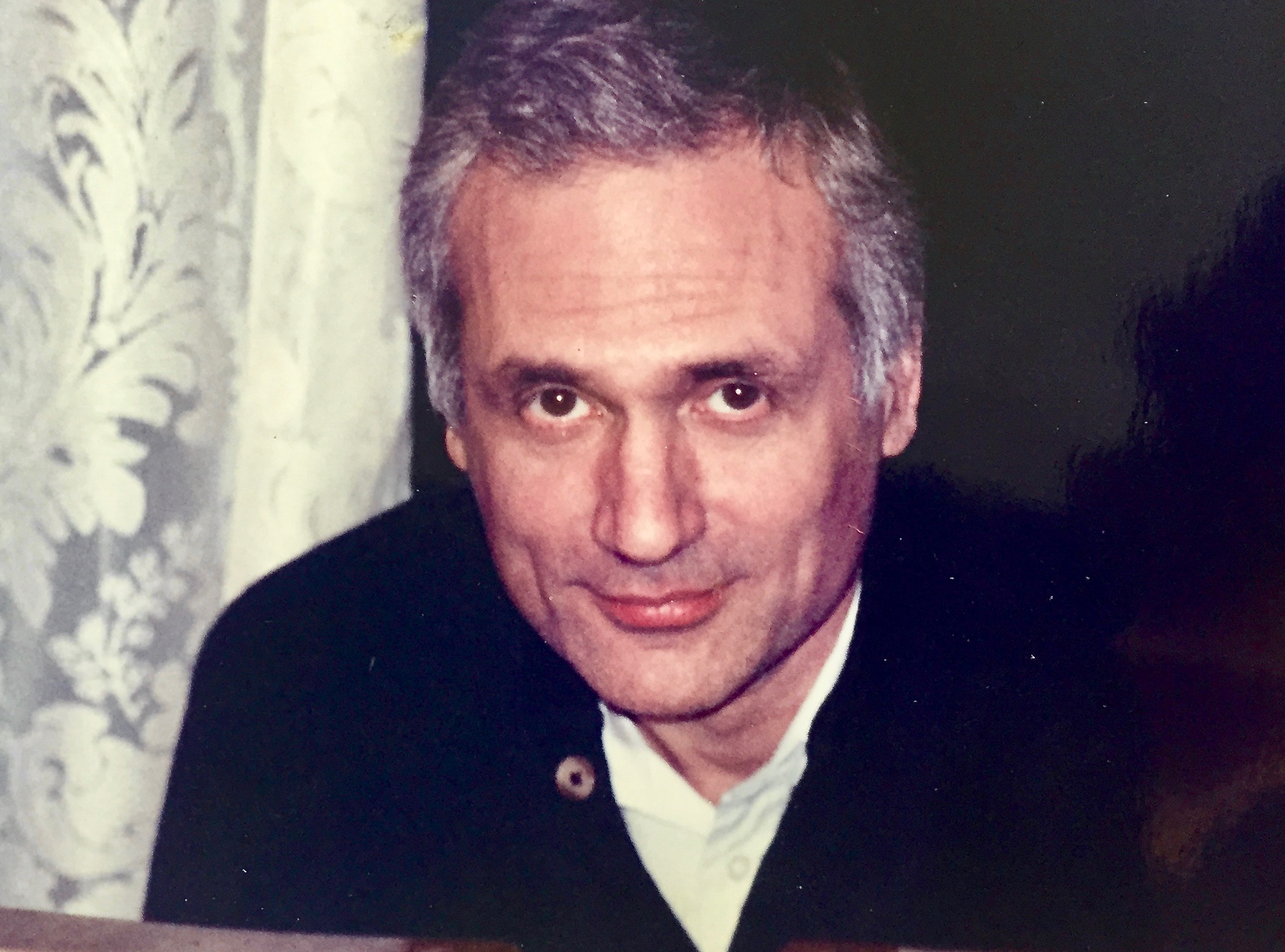
- Occupations: Television writer, director, producer
- Television: Kindred: The Embraced; The Blue and the Gray; She Fought Alone; Wolf Lake
- Awards: Primetime Emmy Award for Outstanding Animated Program (More Than One Hour); 1999 Spawn
- Website: johnleekley.com

John Leekley is an American writer, director and producer. He is one of the most prolific writer/producers in television. He received a Primetime Emmy Award for his work as executive producer/writer on the HBO Original Series Spawn.

Leekley was creator/writer/executive producer of the series Kindred: The Embraced for the Fox Network, which is a cult favorite on the web. He started his television career as co-producer, writer, and creator of the landmark eight-hour CBS mini-series The Blue and The Gray (CBS), starring Gregory Peck as Abraham Lincoln, based on the novel of the same name, that he authored. He has also served as writer/producer for several highly regarded movies including In the Company of Darkness starring Helen Hunt (CBS), She Fought Alone (NBC) which was the first movie to confront the issue of date rape, Buried Secrets (NBC), the four-hour mini-series Night Sins (CBS) based on the best-selling novel of that name, and Mafia Doctor (CBS). He was the creator of the dark supernatural series Wolf Lake for CBS centering on teenagers in a small town in the Northwest who are changelings. He has also written and produced a number of other series for television. In 1996, he and his John Leekley Productions company signed to a exclusive production agreement with MTM Enterprises.

Leekley wrote and directed the theatrical feature film The Prince of Central Park, starring Academy Award nominees Harvey Keitel, Kathleen Turner, Danny Aiello, and Cathy Moriarty. He later completed the futuristic feature film script City of Night. The story revolves around the survivors of a worldwide plague, who gather together in the Bowery of New York City, forming a new minority in America at the bottom of society, with their own mysterious night culture, the gangsters who rule it, and the cops who try to take it back.

Leekley is also the best-selling author of fiction and non-fiction books. He is an historical author, having co-written Moments: The Pulitzer Prize Photographs and edited Reflections on the Civil War, the last book by historian Bruce Catton. He completed the manuscript for a novel, Jazzmen, an epic story about the jazz era from 1900 to the 1920s, set in New Orleans, the river boats, and amidst the mobsters of Chicago. Recently, he wrote the screenplay The White Rose, a true story of medical students in Nazi Germany who formed the only national resistance movement against Hitler and the Gestapo.

He is represented by the Kaplan Stahler Agency.

== Filmography ==
=== As director ===
- Prince of Central Park (2000)

=== As producer ===
- The Blue and the Gray (1982), associate producer
- Private Eye (1987), co-producer
- Nightmare Cafe (1992), supervising producer
- In the Company of Darkness (1993), supervising producer
- Knight Rider 2010 (1994), executive producer
- She Fought Alone (1995), producer
- The Omen, 1995, executive producer
- Kindred: The Embraced (1996), executive producer
- Buried Secrets (1996), executive producer
- Buried Secrets (1996), executive producer
- Night Sins (1997), co-executive producer
- Spawn (1999), co-executive producer
- Wolf Lake (2001), executive producer
- Mafia Doctor (2003)

=== As writer ===
- The Blue and the Gray (1982)
- In the Company of Darkness (1993)
- Knight Rider 2010 (1994)
- She Fought Alone (1995)
- The Omen (1995)
- Buried Secrets (1996)
- Kindred: The Embraced (1996)
- Night Sins (1997)
- Prince of Central Park (2000)
- Wolf Lake (2001)
- Spawn (1999)
- Mafia Doctor (2003)

Leekley has also written episodes of Miami Vice, Nightmare Cafe, and Private Eye.

In the 1990s he wrote a bible for a proposed Doctor Who TV series but was ultimately unused.

== Published works ==
- Moments: the Pulitzer Prize photographs (coauthored with Sheryle Leekley, 1978)
- Reflections on the Civil War (edited for Bruce Catton, 1981)
- The Blue and the Gray : a novel (with Bruce Catton and Ian McLellan Hunter, 1982)
