= Chazz Palminteri =

American actor, producer, screenwriter, and playwright (born 1952)

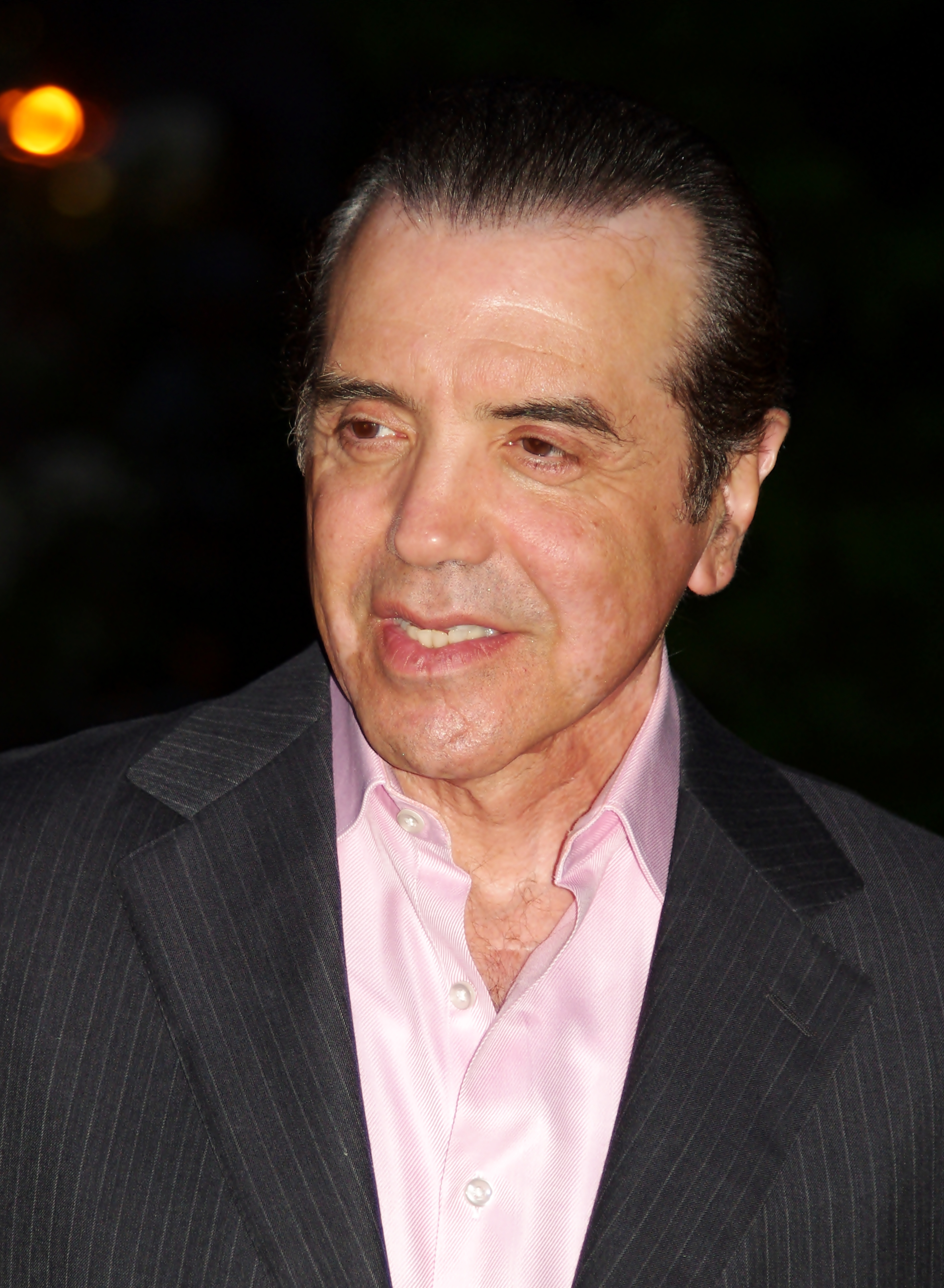
- Palminteri in 2011
- Born: Calogero Lorenzo Palminteri; May 15, 1952 (age 74); New York City, U.S.
- Occupations: Actor; filmmaker; playwright
- Years active: 1983–present
- Spouse: Gianna Ranaudo (m. 1992)
- Children: 2
- Website: chazzpalminteri.net

Calogero Lorenzo "Chazz" Palminteri (born May 15, 1952) is an American actor, producer, screenwriter, and playwright. He is best known for his film roles in A Bronx Tale (1993), based on his play of the same name, along with Bullets Over Broadway (1994) for which he was nominated for an Academy Award for Best Supporting Actor, and The Usual Suspects (1995). His recent work includes his recurring role as Shorty in Modern Family (2010–2019).

His other films include Mulholland Falls (1996), A Night at the Roxbury (1998), Lady and the Tramp II: Scamp's Adventure (2001), Little Man (2006), Once Upon a Time in Queens (2013), and Legend (2015). He is also known for his recurring roles in Wiseguy (1989), Kojak (2005), Rizzoli & Isles (2010–2014) and Godfather of Harlem (2019–2021).

== Early life ==
Calogero Lorenzo Palminteri was born on May 15, 1952, in the Bronx, New York and raised in Fordham, Bronx. He is the son of Rose (née Anello) (1921–2016), a homemaker, and Lorenzo Palminteri (1919–2008), a bus driver. He was raised in the Belmont neighborhood of the Bronx. Palminteri is of Sicilian descent. All four of his grandparents were born in Sicily and emigrated to the United States. Both of his parents were born in New York. His paternal grandparents, Calogero Palminteri and Rosa Bonfante, married in 1908 and emigrated in 1910 from Menfi in the province of Agrigento, Sicily. At the age of nine, Palminteri allegedly witnessed the murder of a mobster in front of his apartment building; the police questioned him, but he maintained that he did not see the incident.

He struggled to become an actor, splitting his time between acting in off-Broadway plays and moonlighting as a bouncer, alongside Dolph Lundgren. In 1988, Palminteri was working at a New York nightclub where a party was being thrown for Hollywood talent agent and dealmaker Irving Paul "Swifty" Lazar. When Lazar tried to enter, Palminteri stopped him as he did not know who he was. Lazar got him fired which led to the broke (and unemployed) Palminteri writing A Bronx Tale for himself to star in since he was not being offered any work.

== Career ==
=== Theater ===
Palminteri starred on Broadway in A Bronx Tale, the autobiographical one-man show based on his childhood that he first performed at Theatre West in Los Angeles in 1989. Palminteri states that he began writing the play after being fired for refusing entry to super agent Swifty Lazar. The Broadway production, directed by Jerry Zaks and with music by John Gromada, began previews October 4, 1988, at the Walter Kerr Theatre and opened on October 25, running for 18 weeks. Palminteri plays 18 roles in A Bronx Tale, which depicts a rough childhood on the streets of the Bronx. The play ran for two months at Playhouse 91 in 1989.

Palminteri starred opposite Kenny D'Aquila in D'Aquila's play, Unorganized Crime. Palminteri always appreciated the shot that Robert De Niro gave him, so he in turn agreed to star in D'Aquila's mafia-themed drama.

Palminteri performed in the Broadway musical version of A Bronx Tale in 2018.

=== Film career ===
Robert De Niro saw Palminteri's Broadway show of A Bronx Tale in 1990, and the two partnered together to adapt the play into a film. Palminteri created the screenplay and starred as Sonny, the gangster Calogero meets, while De Niro directed the film, making his directorial debut, and co-starring as Lorenzo, Calogero's father. The film was a commercial and critical success. In 1994, Palminteri played mob henchman Cheech in the black comedy film Bullets Over Broadway, for which he was nominated for the Academy Award for Best Supporting Actor.

Palminteri also had performances in films such as The Usual Suspects, The Perez Family, Jade, and Diabolique, as well as comedic roles in films such as Oscar, Analyze This and Down to Earth.

During its run, he appeared in many advertisements for Vanilla Coke, in which he portrayed a mob boss who would threaten celebrities if they did not praise the taste of the product in question, and then let them walk away with the Vanilla Coke to "reward their curiosity", touching on its slogan at the time. Palminteri has voiced characters in various animated films, the most notable being Smokey in Stuart Little and Woolworth in Hoodwinked.

He made his directorial debut with an episode of Oz, then the television film Women vs. Men and the 2004 feature film Noel.

Palminteri's recent acting efforts include A Guide to Recognizing Your Saints, Running Scared, and Arthur and the Minimoys.

In 2004, he received the "Indie Hero Award" from the Method Fest Independent Film Festival for his artistic achievements in film.

=== Television ===
On January 20, 2010, Palminteri guested on Modern Family and played the same character on the November 2, 2011, episode. Palminteri has reprised the role twice more in season 5. In June 2010, Palminteri began guest-starring on the TNT crime drama Rizzoli & Isles as Frank Rizzoli, Sr. He guest starred twice on the CBS drama Blue Bloods as Angelo Gallo, a mob lawyer and childhood friend of main character Frank Reagan.

Palminteri portrayed deceased mobster Paul Castellano in the 2001 TV film Boss of Bosses.

=== Other work ===
In 2011, Palminteri opened a restaurant, Chazz: A Bronx Original, in Baltimore's Little Italy neighborhood; its main menu offerings were coal-fired pizza and Italian food. The restaurant closed in 2015. In 2016, he opened Chazz Palminteri Ristorante Italiano in New York City. In 2021, he opened Chazz Palminteri Italian Restaurant in White Plains, New York, with another location in New York City.

Palminteri did the voice acting for the Call of Duty: Black Ops II character Sal De Luca in the zombies map Mob of the Dead, and his likeness was used for the character as well.

On February 15, 2021, during the COVID-19 pandemic, Palminteri launched The Chazz Palminteri Show podcast on YouTube. Palminteri's guests on the podcast have included William Baldwin, Kathrine Narducci, Fat Joe, Mario Cantone, and Shaquille O'Neal.

== Personal life ==
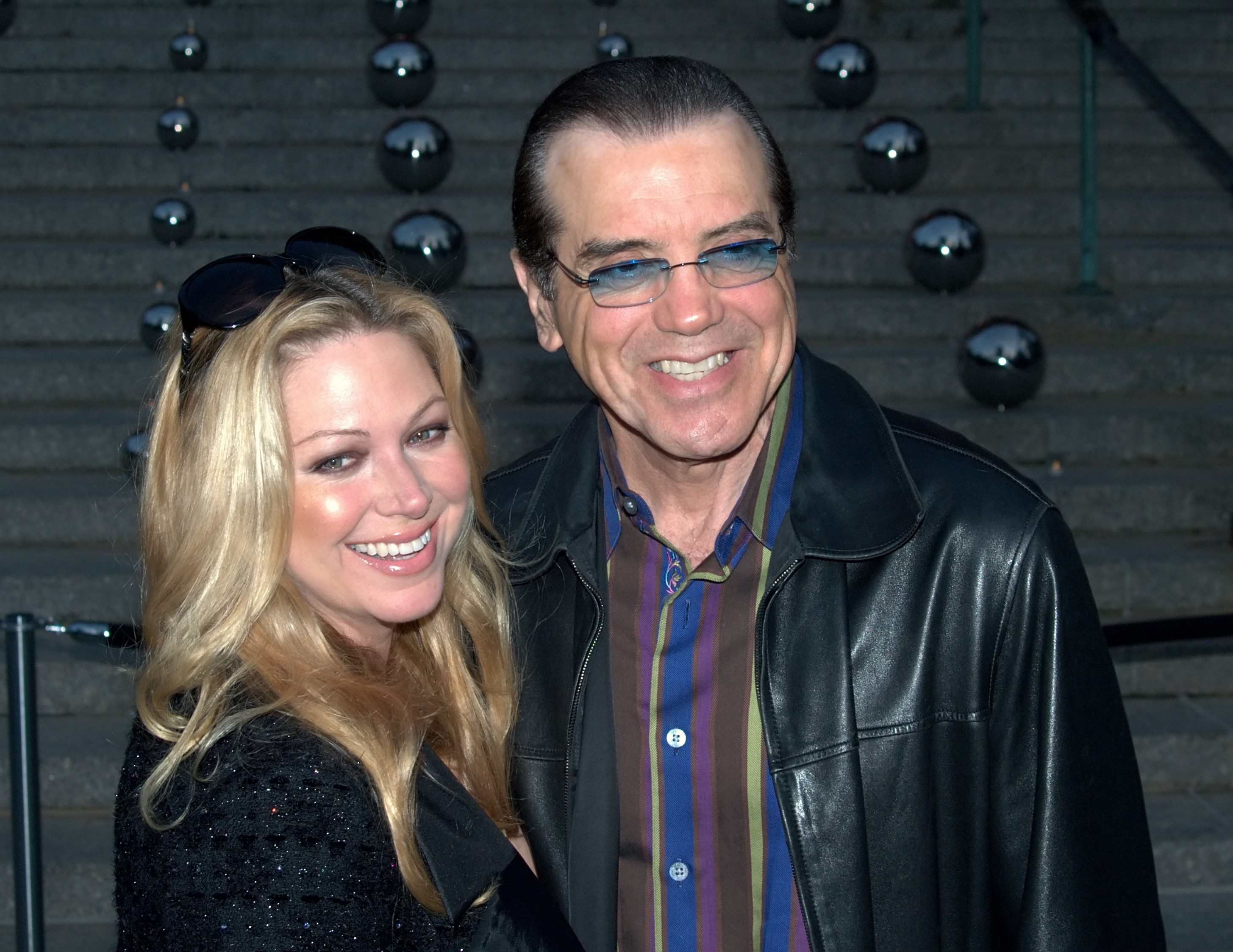
Palminteri with his wife Gianna Ranaudo in New York City, 2010

Palminteri lives in Westchester County, New York, in the town of Bedford. He describes himself as a "very spiritual", devout Roman Catholic. He married Gianna Ranaudo in 1992, and together they have two children.

== Filmography ==
=== Film ===
Year	Title	Role	Notes
1983	Home Free All	Truck Hijacker	
1985	The Last Dragon	Hood No. 2	
1991	Oscar	Connie	
1992	Innocent Blood	Tony Silva	
1992	There Goes the Neighborhood	Lyle Corrente	
1993	A Bronx Tale	"Sonny" LoSpecchio	Also writer
1994	Bullets Over Broadway	"Cheech"	
1995	The Usual Suspects	US Customs Agent Dave Kujan	
1995	The Perez Family	Lieutenant John Pirelli	
1995	The Last Word	Ricky	
1995	Jade	Matt Gavin	
1996	Diabolique	Guy Baran	
1996	Faithful	Tony	Also Writer
1996	Mulholland Falls	Detective Elleroy Coolidge	
1998	Scar City	Lieutenant Laine Devon	
1998	Hurlyburly	Phil	
1998	A Night at the Roxbury	Benny Zadir	
1999	Analyze This	Primo Sidone	
1999	The Book That Wrote Itself	Mr. Palminteri	
1999	Stuart Little	Smokey	Voice
2001	Down to Earth	King	
2001	Lady and the Tramp II: Scamp's Adventure	Buster	Voice; direct-to-video
2001	One Eyed King	Detective Eddie Dugan	
2002	Poolhall Junkies	Joe	
2004	One Last Ride	Tweat	
2004	Noel	Arizona	Also director
2005	Animal	Kassada	Direct-to-video
2005	In the Mix	Frank Pacelli	
2005	Hoodwinked!	Woolworth	Voice
2006	Running Scared	Detective Rydell	
2006	A Guide to Recognizing Your Saints	Monty Montiel	
2006	Push	Vince	
2006	Little Man	Mr. Walken	
2006	Arthur and the Minimoys	Travel Agent	Voice
2007	The Bodyguard	Lee Maxwell	
2007	The Dukes	George	
2008	Yonkers Joe	Joe "Yonkers Joe"	
2008	Jolene	Sal Fontaine	
2009	Once More with Feeling	Frank Gregorio	Direct-to-video
2010	Hollywood & Wine	Geno Scarpaci	Direct-to-video
2012	Mighty Fine	Joe Fine	
2012	The Oogieloves in the Big Balloon Adventure	Milky Marvin The Milkshake	
2013	Once Upon a Time in Queens	Ben Rose	
2013	Metegol	Ermitaño / Stinky	Voice; American dub
2013	Final Recourse	Dr. Tomman	
2014	Henry & Me	Babe Ruth	Voice
2015	Legend	Angelo Bruno	
2019	Vault	Raymond L. S. Patriarca	
2020	Clover	Tony	
TBA	Bad News on the Doorstep		Post-production

=== Television ===
Year	Title	Role	Notes
1986	Hill Street Blues	"Sonny" Cappelito	Episode: "Bald Ambition"
1987	Matlock	MP Sergeant Marcy	Episode: "The Court-Martial: Part 2"
1987	Glory Years	Drummond	TV movie
1989	Peter Gunn	Soldier	TV movie
1989	Dallas	Frank	Episode: "He-e-ere's Papa!"
1989	Valerie	Leslie	Episode: "Viva Las Vegas"
1989	1st & Ten: The Championship	Al	Episode: "Duty Call"
1989	Wiseguy	Peter Alatorre / Sal Rosselli	Recurring cast: Season 3
1990	Sydney	Tony	Episode: "Love Ya, Babe"
1997	The Directors	Himself	Episode: "The Films of William Friedkin"
1999	Dilbert	Leonardo da Vinci	Voice; episode: "Art"
1999	Excellent Cadavers	Giovanni Falcone	TV movie
2001	An All-Star Tribute to Brian Wilson	Himself	Main host
2001	Bravo Profiles	Himself	Episode: "Rod Steiger"
2001	Boss of Bosses	Paul Castellano	TV movie
2003	AFI Life Achievement Award	Himself	Episode: "A Tribute to Robert De Niro"
2003	Biography	Himself	Episode: "Humphrey Bogart"
2004	Dr. Vegas	Duke Walcott	Episode: "Lust for Life"
2005	Kojak	Captain Frank McNeil	Recurring cast
2010	Celebrity Ghost Stories	Himself	Episode: "Episode #2.4"
2010–2014	Rizzoli & Isles	Frank Rizzoli Sr.	Recurring cast: Season 1, Guest: Season 3-4
2010–2019	Modern Family	"Shorty"	Guest Cast: Season 1, 3-5 & 9-10
2011	Rocco's Dinner Party	Himself	Episode: "Ultimate Summer Party"
2012	The Haunting of...	Himself	Episode: "Chazz Palminteri"
2012–2013	Blue Bloods	Angelo Gallo	Guest Cast: Season 3-4
2014	Law & Order: Special Victims Unit	Perry Cannavaro	Episode: "Jersey Breakdown"
2017	Kevin Can Wait	Vincent	Episode: "Plus One Is the Loneliest Number"
2017–2018	Voltron: Legendary Defender	Burr	Voice; guest cast: Season 4 & 8
2019–2021	Godfather of Harlem	Joseph Bonanno	Recurring cast: Season 1-2
2021	Law & Order: Organized Crime	Manfredi Sinatra	Episode: "What Happens in Puglia"
2021–2023	Gravesend	Cesar Tremaldo	Recurring cast: Season 2
2023	Bubble Guppies	Tiny The Slug	Voice; episode: "A Slow Day in Zippy City!"

=== Video games ===
Year	Game	Role	Notes
2012	Call of Duty: Black Ops II	Salvatore "Sal" DeLuca	Featured on 2013's "Uprising" downloadable content.

=== Documentary ===
Year	Title	Notes
1996	Little Italy	
1997	Off the Menu: The Last Days of Chasen's	
1998	Italians in America	
2005	Bullets Over Hollywood	
2008	Beyond Wiseguys: Italian Americans & the Movies	
2014	Journey to Sundance	
2016	Davi's Way	

== Awards and nominations ==
Year	Award	Category	Nominated work	Results	Ref.
1994	Academy Awards	Best Supporting Actor	Bullets Over Broadway	Nominated	
1994	American Comedy Awards	Funniest Supporting Actor in a Motion Picture	Bullets Over Broadway	Nominated	
1994	Chicago Film Critics Association Awards	Best Supporting Actor	Bullets Over Broadway	Nominated	
1994	Independent Spirit Awards	Best Supporting Male	Bullets Over Broadway	Won	
1994	Screen Actors Guild Awards	Outstanding Performance by a Male Actor in a Supporting Role	Bullets Over Broadway	Nominated	
1995	National Board of Review Awards	Best Acting by an Ensemble	The Usual Suspects	Won	
1996	Sant Jordi Awards	Best Foreign Actor	A Bronx Tale, Bullets Over Broadway, and The Usual Suspects	Won	
2006	Sundance Film Festival	Best Ensemble Performance	A Guide to Recognizing Your Saints	Won	

== Theatre work ==
=== Broadway ===
- 2007 – A Bronx Tale: The Musical – performer
- 2013 – Human – performer and writer
- 2014 – Unorganized Crime – Sal Sicuso
- 2016 – A Bronx Tale: The Musical – writer and performer

=== Off-Broadway ===
- 1989 – A Bronx Tale (play) – writer and performer
- 2002 – The Resistible Rise of Arturo Ui – Ernesto Roma
