= Philip Capice =

American television producer

- Born: Philip Charles Capice; June 24, 1931; Bernardsville, New Jersey, U.S.
- Died: December 30, 2009 (aged 78); Los Angeles, California, U.S.
- Occupation: Television producer

Philip Capice (June 24, 1931 – December 30, 2009) was an American television producer, most notable as the executive producer of the dramedy Eight Is Enough and the first nine seasons of the soap opera Dallas.

== Early life ==
Capice graduated from Bernards High School in 1948 and was inducted into the school's hall of fame in 2015.

== Career ==
A graduate of Dickinson College and Columbia University, Capice began his broadcasting career at Benton & Bowles in New York City, where he worked from 1954 to 1969. During that time he was an associate producer of The Edge of Night. Then, from 1969 to 1974 he was director of special programs at CBS, before joining Lorimar Productions in 1974.

=== At Lorimar ===
After four years as vice president of creative affairs at Lorimar, Capice was made president of the company in 1978. At Lorimar, he produced several telefilms and miniseries, including Sybil, for which Capice, Peter Dunne and Jacqueline Babbin received an Emmy Award in 1977. Additionally, he worked with television series, most notably overseeing the creation of Eight Is Enough (1977) and Dallas (1978), for both of which he was named executive producer as they went into production.

Dallas grew to be TV's top rated series in the early 1980s, and Capice was nominated for Emmys in 1980 and 1981 (losing to Lou Grant and Hill Street Blues, respectively). Episodes of Dallas usually ended on a freeze-frame, with the executive producer credit superimposed over the final image before the end credits ran. Since some of the season finales of Dallas were among the most watched and highly anticipated TV shows in the world, Capice's name became very widely recognized. However, creative conflicts between him and Larry Hagman and Leonard Katzman eventually led to Capice leaving Dallas in 1986.

== Death ==
Capice died peacefully in his home in Los Angeles on December 30, 2009.

== Awards ==
Among Capice's awards are:

- Emmy Award in 1977
- Peabody Award in 1977 and 1978
- Humanitas Prize in 1978
- People's Choice Awards in 1980 and 1982

== Filmography ==
All credits as executive producer.

=== TV series ===
- The Blue Knight (1975–1976)
- Hunter (1977)
- Eight Is Enough (1977–1981)
- Dallas, Seasons 1 to 9 (1978–1986)
- Flatbush (1979)
- Two Marriages (1983)

=== Telefilms and miniseries ===
- Bad Ronald (1974)
- The Stranger Within (1974)
- Eric (1975)
- The Runaways (1975)
- Sybil (1976)
- Helter Skelter (1976)
- Widow (1976)
- The Prince of Central Park (1977)
- Green Eyes (1977)
- Buco (1977)
- Long Journey Back (1978)
- A Question of Guilt (1978)
- A Man Called Intrepid (1979)
- Studs Lonigan (1979)
- Some Kind of Miracle (1979)
- A Matter of Life and Death (1981)
- Private Sessions (1985)
