= A Bronx Tale (play) =

One-man show by Chazz Palminteri

- Playbill cover, 2007 Broadway production
- Written by: Chazz Palminteri
- Genre: Auto-biography
- Setting: The Bronx

Premiere
- Date: March 2, 1989
- Place: West Coast Ensemble, Los Angeles, California
- Directed by: Mark W. Travis

A Bronx Tale is an autobiographical one-man show written and performed by Chazz Palminteri. It tells the coming-of-age story of Calogero Anello, a young New Yorker torn between the temptations of organized crime and the values of his hardworking father. Developed and directed by Mark W. Travis, it originally premiered in Los Angeles in 1989 before moving off-Broadway.

A film version, involving Palminteri and Robert De Niro, was released in 1993. In 2007, Palminteri performed his one-man show on Broadway and on tour. A musical version of the show co-directed by De Niro opened in 2016 at the Longacre Theatre on Broadway and played until August 2018.

== Overview ==
A Bronx Tale tells the story of Calogero Anello, a young boy from a working-class family who gets involved in the world of organized crime. Calogero's father is a bus driver, who tries to instill working-class family values in his son. As Calogero gets older, the aura and mystique of the Mafia, and the charms of Sonny, the local mob boss who befriends Calogero (and ends up becoming a father figure to him), become difficult to resist. As Calogero comes of age, he must struggle with the choice of following his beloved father's values or submitting to the temptations of the life of organized crime.

== Background and productions ==
Palminteri states that he began writing the play after being fired from a club when as a doorman, he refused entry to super agent Swifty Lazar. The play is largely based on Palminteri's own childhood, including a shooting that Calogero witnessed at age nine, as well as the conflict "between his dad’s working-class values [his father was a bus driver] and the temptations of the street and his ne’er-do-well friends."

=== 1989 Los Angeles and off-Broadway ===
A Bronx Tale premiered in 1989 in Los Angeles at West Coast Ensemble, a 99-seat venue, with a run from March 2 to April 8. The performance then moved to the larger Theatre West. Developed and directed by Mark W. Travis, it achieved great critical success. Palminteri stated, "After some polishing, the show opened to positive reviews and soon attracted Hollywood interest." "Every director, every studio head wanted to make the movie," Palminteri said, "They offered $250,000, $500,000." Later in 1989, Palminteri appeared in the play off-Broadway at Playhouse 91 in the Upper East Side, from October 10 to December 24, directed by Mark W. Travis. The play had a sold-out run and Palminteri received a 1989–1990 Special Award from the Outer Critics Circle.

=== 2007 Broadway ===
In 2007, Palminteri performed his one-man show on Broadway. The Broadway production began previews on October 4 and opened on October 25 at the Walter Kerr Theatre. The show closed on February 24, 2008, after 18 previews and 111 performances. It was directed by Jerry Zaks and produced by Go Productions with Trent Othick being the lead producer, original music by John Gromada, set design by Jim Noone, and lighting design by Paul Gallo. It recouped its capitalization and was followed by a national tour. The play was nominated for the 2007–2008 Outer Critics Circle Award for Outstanding Solo Performance.

== Film adaptation ==
In 1990, at a performance of A Bronx Tale, Robert De Niro met with Palminteri in his dressing room after having seen the show. De Niro told Palminteri, "This is one of the greatest one-man shows I've ever seen, if not the greatest... This is a movie, this is an incredible movie." After acquiring the rights to create the film, with De Niro claiming the deal was made solely with a gentlemen's agreement with Palminteri, the duo began crafting the screenplay. Prior to partnering with De Niro, Palminteri rejected several offers for the film's rights, including some as high as $1 million, due to not being granted the roles of primary screenwriter and Sonny, the gangster Calogero meets. De Niro met Palminteri's requirements to be allowed to direct the film and to play Lorenzo, Calogero's father, which Palminteri accepted. The film of the same name was released in 1993.

== Musical adaptation ==
After a ten-year development process, the original one man show was adapted into a new musical with a book by Chazz Palminteri, music by Alan Menken, and lyrics by Glenn Slater, and premiered at the Paper Mill Playhouse (Milburn, New Jersey) on February 4, 2016. It opened on Broadway December 1 later that year.

The musical is co-directed by Robert De Niro, who directed the original film, and Jerry Zaks, who directed the one-man show on Broadway in 2007. The show also features choreography by Sergio Trujillo. Tommy Mottola serves as the production's leading producer.

The production includes sets by Beowulf Boritt, costumes by William Ivey Long, lighting by Howell Binkley, and sound by Gareth Owen. The cast features Bobby Conte Thornton as Calogero, Nick Cordero as Sonny, Hudson Loverro as Young Calogero with Athan Sporek as his alternate, Richard H. Blake as Lorenzo, Ariana DeBose as Jane, and Lucia Giannetta as Rosina.

The musical began previews on Broadway on November 3, 2016. It officially opened on December 1, 2016, at the Longacre Theatre and closed on August 5, 2018, after 700 performances.

== Sources ==
- Brennan, Sandra. "Chazz Palminteri Bio" AllMovie.com, accessed December 1, 2016
