= The Book That Wrote Itself =

- Directed by: Liam O Mochain
- Written by: Liam O Mochain
- Starring: Liam O Mochain; Antoinette Guiney; Orlaith Rafter
- Music by: Paul Dwyer
- Release date: August 8, 2000 (Ireland)
- Running time: 71 Minutes
- Country: Ireland
- Language: English
- Budget: $25,000

The Book That Wrote Itself is a 1999 Irish road movie written and directed by Liam O Mochain and starring Liam O Mochain and Antoinette Guiney. It also features cameo appearances from George Clooney, Kenneth Branagh, Melanie Griffith, Bryan Singer and Chazz Palminteri, among others. The film screened at numerous film festivals worldwide and was released in 2000.

== Cast ==
- Liam O Mochain as Vincent Macken
- Antoinette Guiney as Aisling Arrigan
- Orlaith Rafter as Shauna
- Paul Mahon as Sean
- Phillip Owen as Derek
- Carole Meyers as Deirdre Ni Laighean / Diva
- Mike Carberry as Ray Carr
- Sean O Coisdealbha as Mico Seoighe
- Fred McCluskey as John
- Sarah O'Toole as Sheila (credited as Sara O'Toole)
- Mo McMorrow as Marian O'Donnell
- John Crosbie as Mr. Doyle
- Kevin McCann as Daithi
- Sean Roche as Ciaran
- Bernie Grummell as Breda
- Michael D. Higgins as The Narrator (voice)

•Hollywood Celebrities

- Sean Bean as Mr. Bean
- Warren Beatty as Mr. Beatty
- Annette Bening as Mrs. Bening
- Kenneth Branagh as Mr. Branagh
- George Clooney as Mr. Clooney
- Catherine Deneuve as Mrs. Deneuve
- Melanie Griffith as Mrs. Griffith
- Ian McKellen as Mr. McKellen
- Chazz Palminteri as Mr. Palminteri
- Jonathan Pryce as Mr. Pryce
- Jean Reno as Mr. Reno
- Bryan Singer as Mr. Singer
