= The Prince of Central Park (1977 film) =

- Based on: The Prince of Central Park by Evan Rhodes
- Teleplay by: Jeb Rosebrook
- Directed by: Harvey Hart
- Starring: T.J. Hargrave, Lisa Richards, Ruth Gordon
- Music by: Arthur B. Rubinstein
- Country of origin: United States
- Original language: English

Production
- Producers: Philip Capice, Harvey Hart, Christopher Seitz
- Cinematography: Victor J. Kemper
- Editors: Herbert H. Dow, Marjorie Fowler
- Running time: 109 minutes
- Production company: Lorimar Productions

Original release
- Network: CBS
- Release: July 17, 1997

The Prince of Central Park is a 1977 television film. It is based on the novel The Prince of Central Park by Evan Rhodes.

== Plot Synopsis ==
Orphaned teenager J.J. and his younger sister Laurie flee their foster home in Hell’s Kitchen after stealing their uncaring foster mother’s purse. They proceed to hide among the crowds in Central Park. Young delinquent Elmo sees J.J. looking through the purse and warns J.J. that this is his territory before stealing the St. Christopher’s medal that J.J.’s late mother had given him.

The kids steal a sandwich from a picnicking Italian family and befriend a stray dog. Investigating a downed kite, J.J. finds an old, abandoned tree house that was apparently built in 1932 as an offshoot of the Depression-era Hooverville in the park. They decide to make it their home.

While J.J. explores the park, Laurie comes down with her dog, Shadow, and encounters a lonely elderly lady, Mrs. Miller, as well as a young girl, Kristin. J.J. plans to steal construction materials from a Metropolitan Museum of Art construction site, and they enter the museum to kill time before dark. Sighting a painted portrait of the Prince of Wales and a display of knights' armor, Laurie dreams of being a queen, with J.J. as her knight. Scrounging loose lumber and branches, they renovate the tree house. In their new “castle,” Laurie knights J.J. as the “Prince of Central Park.”

Running in the park, Laurie sees Mrs. Miller again, weeping on a bench. A discarded letter shows her daughter in St. Louis saying they don’t have the space to let her move in with them. J.J. scrawls a message on the bench to cheer her up. She’s grateful on her next visit and leaves a reply to look for an orange that she leaves behind a tree. They continue to exchange messages and Mrs. Miller leaves food every day. Asked for their identities, J.J. replies, “The Prince and Princess of Central Park.”

One day, Elmo sees Mrs. Miller leaving the food and steals it. Reading her message to the Prince that she wants to meet them the next day, he waits for her and robs her using a switchblade. J.J. leaps to her defense using a tree branch as a club. Elmo pursues J.J. through the park but backs off when he’s spotted by police.

Laurie is overjoyed when J.J. returns to the treehouse safe. She shows a $10 bill that Elmo almost stole from Mrs. Miller but that she couldn’t return. J.J. decides to use it for a day out, with food and a boat rental in the lake. After dark, they break into the Central Park Carousel for a private ride. Heading back, they’re surprised by Elmo, who pursues J.J. through the park. J.J. gets his medal back but Elmo falls from an overpass onto the 79th Street transverse road below. J.J. tried to save Elmo as Elmo pleaded for his life, but failed.

J.J. is wracked with guilt the next day, thinking Elmo is dead. Mrs. Miller arrives and calls out to them. Laurie decides she no longer wants to hide after three weeks in the park and comes out into the open. Mrs. Miller announces that Elmo is in the hospital but alive and admitted that J.J. tried to save him. She convinces them that they can’t escape the real world by hiding in the park and offers to foster and perhaps adopt them. J.J. leaves the tree house for the last time and the new family walks away together.

== Cast ==
- T.J. Hargrave as J.J. Hargrave eventually became a vice-president for Cantor Fitzgerald and was killed in the collapse of the World Trade Center on September 11, 2001.
- Lisa Richards as Laurie
- Brooke Shields as Kristin
- Ruth Gordon as Mrs. Miller
- Marc Vahanian as Elmo
- Dan Hedaya as Hot Dog Vendor
- Eda Reiss Merin as Alice

== Reception ==
The The New York Times called the film "a joy for children and adults to watch, if possible together".

== Other adaptations ==
The book was further adapted as a musical in the 1980s and a film in 2000.
