= Chapel (character) =

- Chapel

Publication information
- Publisher: Image Comics
- First appearance: Youngblood #1 (April 1992)
- Created by: Rob Liefeld

In-story information
- Alter ego: Bruce Stinson
- Team affiliations: Youngblood; Bloodstrike
- Notable aliases: Lord Chapel

Chapel (Bruce Stinson) is a antihero character appearing in comics published by Rob Liefeld, who created the character in 1992 as a member of the government superhero group Youngblood for their series of the same name published by Extreme Studios.

== Publication history ==
Chapel mostly appeared in the titles Youngblood and Spawn. He appeared in a couple of short-lived, self-titled series. The second Chapel series, published in 1995, was written by Brian Witten and Eric Stephenson and featured the art of Calvin Irving.

== Fictional character biography ==
Bruce Stinson is a black-ops soldier who, late in his career, participates in Operation Knightstrike alongside Al Simmons, a fellow soldier-turned-mercenary. According to the animated series Todd McFarlane's Spawn, Chapel is born in a prison in Joliet, Illinois. He is a known smoker and womanizer who is proficient in unconventional warfare, such as torture. At one point, Chapel is ordered by his superior to murder Al Simmons. The order is given as Al Simmons is a suspected spy. After dying and going to hell, Al Simmons becomes the vigilante Spawn.

Throughout his career, Bruce is instilled with chemicals that give him various superhuman abilities. Unbeknownst to Chapel, he is also injected with a type of HIV which can be activated by his superiors via a special serum. One of his bosses, Jason Wynn, who has frequent feuds with Al Simmons, commissions Chapel to kill him. A while after Al Simmons' death, Chapel becomes a member of Youngblood.

Wynn also for a time turns on Chapel. He tries to use his old enemy Giger to take him down after Chapel refuses a mission from Wynn. This story also introduces Duke, an old colleague of Chapel's and Simmons' who is a supposed traitor to the group.

Spawn eventually regains his memory of Chapel being his killer and begins hunting him. He ambushes Chapel and teleports him to a swampy area in Botswana. There, Chapel has his face disfigured by Spawn (in the likeness of his signature skull makeup). Afterward, Chapel is forced to replace the missing skin with a skull that he grafts onto the parts of the bone that are exposed by his injury.

Afterward, he continues to work with Youngblood. He confronts extra-dimensional invaders that plague the religious hero 'John Prophet'. Chapel is later removed from Youngblood service. Out of curiosity, he hunts Spawn to try to find out the secret of his resurrection. Upon learning about Hell and the Hellspawn process, Chapel commits suicide, shooting himself in the head. However, instead of becoming a Hellspawn, he becomes Lord Chapel, after his rise to power in Hell and his victory over Lucifer (Alexander Graves).

When he is separated from this creature, Chapel returns as a woman named Gazer, only to be turned back to a man again and left feeling empty.

In the later Spawn comics, due to issues with Chapel debuting in Youngblood, Rob Liefeld took back the rights to him. Jessica Priest was later added in the comics as Al Simmons's killer. The Scorched 24 introduces Frank Bishop as another character replacing Chapel as Jessica becomes more heroic.

Later Youngblood comics reveal Chapel had a son named Chapel Jr. who takes his father's place as a member of Youngblood as his father returns as Lord Chapel.

== In other media ==
Absent from the live-action Spawn film, Chapel was replaced by Jessica Priest. Chapel (called Jess Chapel) made appearances on HBO's Todd McFarlane's Spawn, in which he had the same backstory as the comics version. He was voiced by Ruben Santiago-Hudson.
