= Kenny D'Aquila =

Kenny D'Aquila is an American actor, writer, producer, and singer.

== Personal life ==
D'Aquila was born in Old Saybrook, Connecticut and grew up with his parents and three brothers. During high school, D'Aquila was a captain of his football team, but an injury ended his sports career.

He moved to Hollywood to pursue his acting and screenwriting career, supporting himself by working as a waiter.

After marrying and having a son, he temporarily left show business to focus on fatherhood. After his father died from cancer, tensions within his family inspired his play, Unorganized Crime.

== Career ==
D'Aquila wrote, produced, and starred in the play Unorganized Crime, opposite Chazz Palminteri, in its Los Angeles premiere. D'Aquila starred as Grantaire in the 2nd National Tour of Les Misérables, also known as the "Fantine Company" which premiered at the Shubert Theatre in Los Angeles on 1 June 1988. D'Aquila remained with the show for the duration of its 14-month Los Angeles premiere engagement. D'Aquila was asked to record his performance as Grantaire on the musical's Complete Symphonic Recording (1988), which won a Grammy Award for Best Musical Theater Album. D'Aquila has appeared in more than 30 plays.

== Selected filmography ==
- Father Dowling Mysteries (1991)
- Jake and the Fatman (1989)
- Caddyshack II (1988)
- Santa Barbara (1987)
- Ohara (1987)
- Matlock (1987)
- Hill Street Blues (1987)
- Hotel (1986)
- L.A. Law (1986)
