= A Bronx Tale (musical) =

Musical based on the play by the same name

- The New Musical
- Playbill cover, original Broadway production
- Music: Alan Menken
- Lyrics: Glenn Slater
- Book: Chazz Palminteri
- Basis: A Bronx Tale by Chazz Palminteri
- Premiere: February 4, 2016: Paper Mill Playhouse; Millburn, New Jersey
- Productions: 2016 Paper Mill Playhouse; 2016 Broadway

A Bronx Tale is a musical based on the play by the same name with a book by Chazz Palminteri, music by Alan Menken, and lyrics by Glenn Slater. After a ten-year development process, the original one-man show was adapted into a new musical and premiered at the Paper Mill Playhouse, in Millburn, New Jersey on February 4, 2016. It opened on Broadway December 1 later that year.

The original Broadway production was co-directed by Robert De Niro, who had directed the original film, and Jerry Zaks, who had directed the one-man show on Broadway in 2007. The show also features choreography by Sergio Trujillo. Tommy Mottola serves as the production's leading producer.

== Production history ==
The musical began previews on Broadway on November 3, 2016. It officially opened on December 1 later that year at the Longacre Theatre. On August 31, Christiani Pitts joined the cast after originally serving as understudy for Jane, and Adam Kaplan joined the cast as Calogero on November 9, 2017. They succeeded Bobby Conte Thornton and Ariana DeBose. Other cast members included "Tony Award nominee Nick Cordero as Sonny, Richard H. Blake as Lorenzo, Lucia Giannetta as Rosina, and Bradley Gibson as Tyrone."

The production includes sets by Beowulf Boritt, costumes by William Ivey Long, lighting by Howell Binkley, and sound by Gareth Owen. The cast features Bobby Conte Thornton as Calogero, Nick Cordero as Sonny, Hudson Loverro as Young Calogero with Athan Sporek as his alternate, Richard H. Blake as Lorenzo, Ariana DeBose as Jane, and Lucia Giannetta as Rosina. On May 3, 2018, it was announced that Chazz Palminteri would reprise his role as Sonny from the original play for a limited time beginning May 24. On June 27, 2018, producers announced the show would close on August 5, 2018, after playing 700 regular performances and 29 previews.

On January 30, 2018, producers announced that the show would launch a North American national tour that autumn. The musical began the tour in Rochester, New York in October 2018, with Joe Barbara as Sonny and Richard H. Blake as Lorenzo.

Upon closing, Broadway Licensing acquired the rights for stock and amateur performance rights.

== Musical numbers ==
Act I

- "Belmont Avenue" – Doo-Wop Guys, Calogero and Ensemble
- "Look to Your Heart" – Lorenzo and Young Calogero
- "Roll 'Em" – Sonny, Young Calogero and Ensemble
- "I Like It" – Young Calogero and Ensemble
- "Giving Back the Money" – Lorenzo, Young Calogero, Rosina and Sonny
- "I Like It (Reprise)" – Calogero, Young Calogero, Sonny and Ensemble
- "Ain't It The Truth" – Calogero, Handsome Nick, Crazy Mario and Sally Slick
- "Out of Your Head" – Calogero, Jane, Denise, Frieda, and Ensemble
- "Nicky Machiavelli" – Sonny, Rudy the Voice, Tony Ten-to-Two, Jojo the Whale, Frankie Coffeecake, Eddie Mush
- "These Streets" – Lorenzo, Sonny, Rosina and Ensemble

Act II

- "Webster Avenue" – Jane, Calogero, Tyrone, Jesse, Denise and Frieda
- "Out of Your Head (Reprise)" – Jane
- "One of the Great Ones" – Sonny
- "Ain't It The Truth (Reprise)" – Tyrone and Jesse
- "Look to Your Heart (Reprise)" – Rosina
- "One of the Great Ones (Reprise)" – Calogero
- "Hurt Someone" – Tyrone, Calogero, Sally Slick, Handsome Nick, Crazy Mario, Jane, Jesse, Freida, Denise, Ensemble
- "In a World Like This" – Calogero, Jane and Ensemble
- "The Choices We Make" – Calogero, Lorenzo, Jane, Rosina, Company

== Casts ==
The principal original cast of the Broadway production.

Character	Millburn	Broadway	National Tour
Character	2016		2018
Calogero	Jason Gotay	Bobby Conte Thornton	Joey Barreiro
Sonny	Nick Cordero	Nick Cordero	Joe Barbara
Young Calogero	Joshua Colley	Hudson Loverro; Athan Sporek	Frankie Leoni; Shane Pry
Lorenzo	Richard H. Blake	Richard H. Blake	Richard H. Blake
Rosina	Lucia Giannetta	Lucia Giannetta	Michelle Aravena
Jane	Coco Jones	Ariana DeBose	Brianna-Marie Bell
Tyrone	Isaiah Tyrelle Boyd	Bradley Gibson	Antonio Beverly
