= Tommy DeVito =

Tommy DeVito may refer to:

- Tommy DeVito (American football) (born 1998), American football quarterback
- Tommy DeVito (musician) (1928–2020), American musician and singer, member of the Four Seasons
- Tommy DeVito, a character in the film Goodfellas
