= A Bronx Tale =

1993 film directed by Robert De Niro

- Theatrical release poster
- Directed by: Robert De Niro
- Screenplay by: Chazz Palminteri
- Based on: A Bronx Tale by Chazz Palminteri
- Produced by: Jane Rosenthal; Jon Kilik; Robert De Niro
- Starring: Robert De Niro; Chazz Palminteri; Lillo Brancato; Taral Hicks; Kathrine Narducci
- Cinematography: Reynaldo Villalobos
- Edited by: David Ray; Robert Q. Lovett
- Music by: Butch Barbella
- Production companies: Price Entertainment; Tribeca Productions
- Distributed by: Savoy Pictures
- Release dates: September 14, 1993 (TIFF); September 29, 1993 (United States)
- Running time: 120 minutes
- Country: United States
- Language: English
- Budget: $10 million
- Box office: $17.3 million

A Bronx Tale is a 1993 American coming-of-age crime drama film directed by and starring Robert De Niro in his directorial debut and produced by Jane Rosenthal, adapted from Chazz Palminteri's 1989 one-man play. It tells the coming-of-age story of an Italian-American boy, Calogero, who, after encountering a local Mafia boss, is torn between the temptations of organized crime and the values of his honest, hardworking father, as well as racial tensions in his community. The Broadway production was converted to film with limited changes.

De Niro, who first viewed the play in Los Angeles in 1990, acquired the rights from Palminteri, with the intent of making the play his directorial debut. The duo worked heavily together on the screenplay, with Palminteri aiming to retain many of the aspects of the original script, as it was based largely on his own childhood. Production began in 1991 and was funded in collaboration with De Niro's Tribeca Productions and Savoy Pictures, as the first film released by each studio.

A Bronx Tale premiered at the Toronto International Film Festival on September 14, 1993, and was released in the United States on September 29, 1993. The film achieved limited commercial success, grossing more than $17 million domestically. However, it fared much better with critics, who praised the performances of the leads. The film launched Palminteri's acting career and also helped De Niro gain acceptance as a director.

== Plot ==
In 1960, nine-year-old Calogero lives in Belmont, a working-class Italian-American neighborhood in the Bronx with his father Lorenzo, a Surface Transit (later MTA) bus driver, and his mother Rosina. Calogero becomes enamored of the Mafia presence in his neighborhood, led by local boss Sonny.

One day, Calogero witnesses Sonny shoot and kill a man who was assaulting his friend. Calogero keeps quiet when questioned by police detectives. Sonny's men offer Lorenzo a better-paying job, but preferring a law-abiding life, he politely declines.

Sonny befriends Calogero and nicknames him "C." Calogero earns tips working in Sonny's bar and throwing dice, but is admonished by Lorenzo when he discovers the cash that his son has earned. Lorenzo returns the money to Sonny and warns him to keep away from Calogero.

Eight years later, 17-year-old Calogero has been visiting Sonny regularly without his father's knowledge. Calogero is part of a gang of local Italian-American boys, which concerns Sonny, who does not want him to live a life of crime.

Calogero meets an African-American girl, Jane, and a tentative romance blossoms between them. Despite the high racial tensions between Italian-Americans and African-Americans in the area, Calogero arranges a date with Jane. He asks for advice from Sonny, who lends Calogero his car to impress her.

Earlier, Calogero's friends beat up a group of African-American cyclists riding through the neighborhood. During the fight, Calogero initially refuses his friends' calls for help. He eventually joins the others, but rather than fighting, he tries to protect a cyclist. The cyclist turns out to be Jane's brother, who accuses Calogero of beating him up when he and Jane meet for their date. Calogero loses his temper and calls him a "nigger," which he instantly regrets. Jane, disappointed, leaves with her brother.

At home, Lorenzo confronts Calogero after seeing him driving Sonny's car. They argue, and Calogero storms out. He runs into his friends, who tell him that some African Americans egged their social club in retaliation for the beating. Sonny and his crew confront Calogero after finding a bomb on Sonny's car, but Sonny realizes he is innocent. Calogero's friends begin discussing their plan to use Molotov cocktails to get revenge on the African Americans. Not wishing to appear scared, Calogero feigns willingness to join in.

After their car stops at a traffic signal, Sonny appears and orders Calogero to get out. Calogero complies. Calogero catches up with Jane, who tells him that her brother admitted he was not the one who attacked him. As Jane and Calogero reconcile, he suddenly remembers his friends' plan, and the two rush to stop them. His friends target a record shop. After performing a drive-by shooting, they begin to throw Molotov cocktails into the store. As they drive away, the African-American shopkeeper throws an unbroken Molotov cocktail through an open window, which ignites a box of unused cocktails, and blows up the car. When Calogero and Jane arrive, they find his friends dead.

Calogero, afraid for his safety in Jane's neighborhood, rushes to Sonny's bar to thank him for saving his life, but the young man who had planted the car bomb shoots Sonny in the head moments before Calogero can warn him. Calogero learns that the killer is the son of the man whom Sonny killed eight years earlier.

At Sonny's funeral, countless people pay their respects, but as Sonny had once stated, none of them seems to really care about his death. When everyone but Calogero have gone, a man named Carmine arrives. Calogero tells him that Sonny once saved his life; Carmine says Sonny saved him too. Calogero does not recognize Carmine until he sees a scar on his forehead and realizes that he was the man Sonny protected eight years ago. Carmine tells Calogero that he is filling in for Sonny and promises to help Calogero if he ever needs it. Carmine leaves as Lorenzo unexpectedly arrives to pay his respects. Lorenzo thanks Sonny for saving his son's life and admits that he never hated him, but resented him for making Calogero grow up so quickly. Calogero bids goodbye to Sonny and walks home with Lorenzo.

== Cast ==
- Robert De Niro as Lorenzo
- Chazz Palminteri as "Sonny"
- Lillo Brancato Jr. as Calogero (age 17)
- Francis Capra as Calogero (age 9)
- Taral Hicks as Jane
- Kathrine Narducci as Rosina
- Clem Caserta as Jimmy "Whispers"
- Frank Pietrangolare as Danny "K.O."
- Joe Pesci as Carmine
- Alfred Sauchelli Jr. as Bobby "Bars"
- Robert D'Andrea as Tony "Toupee"
- Eddie Montanaro as Eddie "Mush"
- Fred Fischer as Joe "Jo Jo the Whale"
- Dave Salerno as Frankie "Coffeecake"
- Joe D'Onofrio as "Slick" (age 17)
- Louis Vanaria as Mario "Crazy Mario"
- Sobe Bailey as Willy, Jane's brother
- Domenick Lombardozzi as Nicky "Zero"

== Production ==
The film is based on Chazz Palminteri's original play of the same name, which was performed as a one-man show, largely based on his own childhood, specifically the shooting that Calogero witnesses as a child, as well his father's occupation and name.

In 1990, at a performance of A Bronx Tale, Robert De Niro met with Palminteri in his dressing room after seeing the show. De Niro told Palminteri, "This is one of the greatest one-man shows I've ever seen, if not the greatest.... This is a movie, this is an incredible movie." After acquiring the rights to create the film, with De Niro claiming the deal was made solely with a gentlemen's agreement with Palminteri, the duo began crafting the screenplay. Prior to partnering with De Niro, Palminteri rejected several offers for the film's rights, including some as high as $1 million, because he was not granted the roles of primary screenwriter and Sonny, the gangster whom Calogero meets. De Niro met Palminteri's requirements to be allowed to direct the film and to play Lorenzo, Calogero's father, which Palminteri accepted.

== Release ==
=== Theatrical ===
The film premiered at the Toronto International Film Festival on September 14, 1993. It was released in the United States on September 29, 1993.

=== Home media ===
HBO Video released the movie on VHS on April 6, 1994, and in 1998 on DVD. In January 2010, Focus Features released a DVD copy of the film exclusive to online retailer Amazon.

== Reception ==
=== Box office ===
A Bronx Tale opened in 1,077 theaters, with an opening weekend gross of $3.7 million. It went on to make $17.3 million domestically.

=== Critical response ===
On Rotten Tomatoes, the film holds an approval rating of 97%, based on 36 reviews, with an average rating of 7.5/10. The site's critical consensus reads, "A Bronx Tale sets itself apart from other coming-of-age dramas thanks to a solid script, a terrific cast, and director Robert De Niro's sensitive work behind the camera." Metacritic gave it a weighted average score of 80 out of 100, based on 15 critics, indicating "generally favorable" reviews.

Critic Roger Ebert of the Chicago Sun-Times gave the film four stars out of 4 and called it "very funny [and] very touching. It is filled with life and colorful characters and great lines of dialogue, and De Niro, in his debut as a director, finds the right notes as he moves from laughter to anger to tears [while] retaining its values."

In 2008, the American Film Institute nominated the film for its Top 10 Gangster Films list.

== 30th anniversary restoration ==
To celebrate the 30th anniversary of A Bronx Tale in 2023, Tribeca Productions, with technology and distribution partner Giant Pictures, undertook a 4K digital restoration of the film. The original negative was provided by the Harry Ransom Center film archive at the University of Texas at Austin, which houses the Robert De Niro collection. The film master and audio were digitally scanned and restored to create an ultra-high-definition 4K version of the film. The digital coloring process was handled at Goldcrest Post in New York and was personally overseen by director Robert De Niro. The restoration took 9 months to complete.

Coinciding with its 30th anniversary on September 29, 2023, Tribeca and Giant Pictures released the 4K version on UHD Blu-ray in the US, as well as on video-on-demand platforms, including Apple TV and Vudu. Titled A Bronx Tale (30th Anniversary Edition), the release showcases the new restoration in Ultra High Definition Dolby Vision and Dolby TrueHD 5.1 Surround sound. The UHD Blu-ray edition includes new interviews with director and star Robert De Niro and writer and star Chazz Palminteri, reflecting on how the film has become a beloved classic, as well as recalling the original production process, how the screenplay was adapted and the authenticity of the film's characters.

== Awards and nominations ==
Award	Category	Nominee(s)	Result	Ref.
Artios Awards	Best Feature Film Casting – Drama	Ellen Chenoweth	Nominated	
Sant Jordi Awards	Best Foreign Actor	Chazz Palminteri (also for Bullets Over Broadway and The Usual Suspects)	Won	
Young Artist Awards	Best Youth Actor Co-Starring in a Motion Picture – Drama	Francis Capra	Nominated	
