= Prince of Central Park (musical) =

- Original Broadway Playbill
- Music: Don Sebesky
- Lyrics: Gloria Nissenson
- Book: Evan H. Rhodes
- Basis: The Prince of Central Park by Evan H. Rhodes
- Productions: 1988 Workshop (Key West); 1988 World Premiere (Miami Beach); 1989 Broadway

Prince of Central Park is a 1989 Broadway musical with music by Don Sebesky, lyrics by Gloria Nissenson and a book by Evan H. Rhodes. It is based on Rhodes' 1974 novel The Prince of Central Park and its 1977 television movie adaptation which starred Ruth Gordon and Brooke Shields. The musical was a notorious flop, losing nearly $2 million and closing after only four performances. Today, it is best remembered for a humorously negative review by Frank Rich in The New York Times.

== Synopsis ==
The musical tells the story of Jay-Jay, a 12-year-old runaway who tries to escape an abusive foster mother and the terrors of New York City by living in a tree in Central Park. Communicating via chalk messages on a park bench, he begins an unlikely correspondence with Margie Miller, a middle aged divorcé who jogs through the park and whose daughter is conspiring to send her to a Florida retirement village. Eventually Margie befriends Jay-Jay, helping him to fight off the gangs and drug pushers of the park, while learning about life and herself in the process. Together they become a sort of surrogate family.

== Development and World Premiere ==
After the success of the TV movie, Rhodes was approached by BMI to adapt his book The Prince of Central Park into a possible musical. The world premiere starring Martha Raye and staged by Albert Marre was announced and scheduled to open on November 7, 1985 at the Drury Lane Oakbrook Terrace Theatre in Oakbrook Terrace, Illinois, but this production was ultimately canceled when the producer was sent to jail on tax charges.

In December 1985, Jan McArt, a performer and theater producer who was nicknamed "The First Lady of Florida's Musical Theatre," was introduced to Rhodes and became interested in the project. After securing the rights from Lorimar, who had produced the TV movie, McArt began to develop the show with Rhodes writing the book, Don Sebesky writing the music and Gloria Nissenson writing the lyrics. The first production meeting was held in August 1987 at the Boca Raton Resort and Club, where Bob Bogandoff was selected as the director. In May 1988, McArt flew to Los Angeles to personally offer the musical's leading role to Nanette Fabray.

The show premiered as a "work in progress" on October 25, 1988 at McArt's Mallory Square Cabaret Theatre in Key West starring Fabray as Mrs. Miller, 13-year-old Richard H. Blake as Jay-Jay (the title character), Anthony Galde as Elmo, a gang leader and an ensemble of 9 actors. At the second performance, Fabray was sick so producer McArt played the role as her understudy. The show closed on November 29.

Impressed with the musical, Abe Hirschfield, a Miami Beach real estate magnate, joined on as producer and mounted a full production at his 900-seat Hirschfeld Theatre in the Clarion Castle Hotel in Miami Beach. The cast was expanded to 20, with Fabray, Blake and Galde remaining in the leads; producer McArt appeared in a "cameo" as a crazy homeless bag lady who makes telephone calls from a broken phone; Hirschfeld's granddaughter also appeared in the show. The production was directed by Bob Bogandoff and choreographed by Michael DiFonzo.

Prince of Central Park ran from February 3 to March 5, 1989 and was generally well received by local audiences, though critics were mixed. The Miami Herald wrote that the show was "not yet" ready for Broadway. The Sun-Sentinel felt the show was "overlong" and "occasionally tedious" but ultimately "charming." It singled out Blake's performance, calling him "an '80s male echo of the appeal Andrea McArdle brought to the original Annie.

== Pre-Broadway ==
From April to June, the show was substantially rewritten with the addition of nine new songs before it headed to Broadway with a scheduled opening date of October 30, 1989. Among the changes were an addition of "Red," a musical number set at Bloomingdale's in which mannequins come to life and begin dancing.

Although she was with the show from the beginning, Fabray was let go from the project during the summer of 1989. Director Bogandoff was also fired as the producers searched for a replacement with Broadway credentials (and a Tony nomination).

Fabray was replaced by Gloria DeHaven and Bogandoff was replaced by Tony Tanner, who also served as choreographer. On September 26, DeHaven left the show due to an injury to her rib and "unspecified artistic differences." Producer Jan McArt later told the Boca Raton News that because the show was being rewritten daily, DeHaven was having trouble learning her new lines and they needed someone who was "a quick study." Broadway wags, sensing a troubled production, began to call the show "Ain't Miss DeHaven."

McArt, whose theatre hosted the show's first production, took over the role for two weeks until DeHaven could be replaced. Jo Anne Worley quit a California production of Mame to join the cast on October 10 and the show's opening date was postponed until November 9 to allow her more time to rehearse.

== Broadway production ==
On October 24, 1989, Prince of Central Park began previews on Broadway at the Belasco Theatre and opened on November 9 with Worley and Blake in the leads. At 14, Blake became the youngest Broadway performer to have his name above the title of the show. The sets and costumes were designed by Michael Bottari and Ronald Case and the lighting design was by Norman Coates.

=== Characters ===
- Jay-Jay, the prince of Central Park
- Margie Miller, a recent divorcé
- Elmo, a gang leader
- Sally, Margie's daughter
- May Berg
- Anna Squagliatoria
- Agnes
- Aerobics Instructor
- Park Ranger Rupp
- Stock Broker
- Park Ranger
- School Guard
- Carpenter
- Fist
- Twitchy
- Bird Brain
- Feather
- Young Margie
- Young Richard
- Officer Simpson
- Officer Washinski
- Bag Lady
- Floor Walker
- Maitr'd
- Waiter
- Ballet Dancer

=== Musical numbers ===
Act 1

- 1. "Here's Where I Belong" – Jay-Jay and Ensemble
- 2. "All I've Got Is Me" – Jay-Jay
- 3. "New Leaf" – Margie and Aerobics Club
- 4. "Follow the Leader" – Elmo, Gang and Jay-Jay
- 5. "Montage: Here's Where I Belong" – Ensemble
- 6. "We Were Dancing" – Margie, Young Richard, Young Margie
- 7. "One of a Kind" – Margie and Jay-Jay
- 8. "I Fly By Night" – Elmo and Gang
- 9. "Zap" – Margie, Jay-Jay and Ensemble

Act 2

- 10. "Good Evening" – Ensemble
- 11. "All I've Got Is Me (Reprise)" – Margie and Jay-Jay
- 12. "They Don't Give You Life at Sixteen" – Elmo and Gang
- 13. "Red" - Margie, Ensemble
- 14. "I Fly By Night (Reprise)" – Elmo, Gang and Jay-Jay
- 15. "The Prince of Central Park" – Jay-Jay
- 16. "One of a Kind (Reprise)" – Margie

== Critical response ==
The musical received overwhelmingly negative reviews by Broadway critics, who found that the show was both amateurish and made light of serious social issues such as street crime, drugs, homelessness and child abuse, while turning gritty New York City into a sentimental fairy tale. Though aimed at a family audience, critics noted that the show had moments of vulgarity, such as a scene in which two gay men happily emerge from the bushes after having sex and jokes in which the character of Margie comments on her sagging breasts and her estranged husband's penis.

The New Yorker called the show "a really bad musical" and "a howler" and agreed that it had "so many references to the Tavern on the Green that it's almost impossible to believe that the restaurant's owners haven't underwritten the show."

The Associated Press, in a kinder review, said that the show was "a New York fairy tale told with a modest amount of musical imagination and wit ... a small musical in almost every respect. It's not awful, but its mildness and meager musical numbers make it a dim prospect to last very long on Broadway."

Linda Winer of Newsday found Worley to be "likable" and "surprisingly restrained" while calling Blake "a major young talent."

=== Frank Rich review ===
In his famously scathing and humorous review in The New York Times, Frank Rich wrote:

"Prince of Central Park, the new musical at the Belasco, is a numbing evening of such guileless amateurism that it will probably have a future as a Harvard Business School case study, whatever its fate in the annals of drama. Even modest Broadway shows like this cost more money than the gross national product of some third world nations. People put up this money. As long as there are people as gullible as the sponsors of Prince of Central Park, the theater need never fear for its survival."

Rich's review went on to include a deliberately incorrect and funny summary of the plot:

"In Act II, Jay-Jay and Margie bravely overcome outmoded legal obstacles and moral attitudes to get married. They adopt five children, two of whom become the first sibling astronauts and together head a successful manned space mission to Pluto. Actually, I am lying. Something else entirely happens in Act II. But I assure you that my version is more interesting.

Rich also mocked the fact that the authors seemed to have no connection to New York City, writing:

"The biggest unintentional laugh for a New York audience arrives when Ms. Worley ventures into Bloomingdale's and is immediately welcomed by a kindly silver-haired saleswoman who offers her complete undivided attention."

Blake, who had turned down Michael Eisner's offer of a part on The Mickey Mouse Club to be in the production, was compared by Rich to "an aging Mouseketeer." The review concluded with:

"Prince of Central Park also has a serious obsession with Tavern on the Green, whose name is dragged into nearly every scene before and after serving as a setting for a dance number. Given the vehicle for these insistent plugs, it's hard to know whether the restaurant should consider itself the beneficiary of free advertising or the victim of a dissatisfied customer's personal vendetta."

== Aftermath ==
The opening night after-party was held at Tavern on the Green, where 600 formally attired patrons showed up to celebrate. At the party, Rhodes predicted that the show would run for years, but after the uniformly negative reviews were published in the papers, hopes began to fade.

Producer and majority backer Abe Hirschfeld, who had successfully run for Miami Beach City Commission during the production, at first tried to counter the bad reviews with an extensive advertising campaign, calling the critics "liars," claiming that New York critics had a "vendetta" against South Florida shows and emphatically stating "we are not closing the show." To help boost the show, the actors agreed to work for scale and the Shubert Organization, owners of the Belasco Theatre (which had been unoccupied for two years) offered to waive its rental fee for four months until February 1, 1990. But within a few days, after production costs quickly began to mount, Hirschfeld himself closed the show, stating: "I kept saying there should be no changes from the Miami Beach version. You can`t come into New York with a new show without trying it out. It was destroyed by the way it was changed about. Since I didn't like the show, I didn't think it was worth it."

Prince of Central Park ran for four performances. The $2 million production (75 percent of which was put up by Hirschfeld) earned only $128,907 during its entire run (4 performances and 19 previews).

In Hot Seat, Frank Rich's annotated book of his New York Times theatre reviews, he recalled that Prince of Central Park was "laughed off by all the critics and quickly disappeared" and that Variety had accused him of tricking his readers "by supplying his own, ostensibly superior libretto for the show" in his review. Rich wrote that Hirschfeld went on to purchase the New York Post for two weeks (nearly destroying it) and later served time in jail and that in retrospect, the flop was one of the finer achievements of his career.

In 2000, Hirschfeld was convicted of criminal solicitation for trying to hire a hit man to kill his former business partner Stanley Stahl, with whom he had a "survivor take all" business partnership. Hirschfeld was sentenced to three years in prison, of which he served two. When he got out of prison he ran for the U.S. Senate, calling himself "Honest Abe".
