= Prince of Central Park =

- Directed by: John Leekley
- Produced by: Steven Seagal
- Starring: Kathleen Turner; Danny Aiello; Cathy Moriarty; Harvey Keitel
- Music by: Theodore Shapiro
- Distributed by: Keystone Studios
- Release date: September 22, 2000
- Running time: 109 minutes

Prince of Central Park is a 2000 film. The cast included Kathleen Turner, Danny Aiello, Harvey Keitel, and Cathy Moriarty. It was written and directed by John Leekley, and produced by Julius R. Nasso, Steven Seagal, and John P. Gulino. The film is a remake of the 1977 TV movie The Prince of Central Park, starring Ruth Gordon and T.J. Hargrave; both films were based on the novel The Prince of Central Park by Evan Rhodes.

== Plot ==
12-year-old J.J. Somerled (Frankie Nasso) runs away because his mother died and he has been placed in the care of an abusive foster mother. He takes his electronic keyboard, and lives in Central Park in New York City. He learns a lot, and meets a lot of people there including a person called "The Guardian" (Harvey Keitel).

== Cast ==
- Kathleen Turner as Rebecca Cairn
- Danny Aiello as Noah Cairn
- Cathy Moriarty as Mrs. Ardis
- Frankie Nasso as J.J. Somerled
  - Francesco Vittorio as Young J.J. Somerled
- Harvey Keitel as The Guardian
- Luna Lauren Velez as Rosa Sanchez
- Tina Holmes as Annalisse Somerled
- Carmen Moreno as Sophia
- Svetlana Efremova as Sophia's Mom
- Jaliyl Lynn as Dominique
- Mtume Gant as "Easy"
- John P. Gulino as Deputy Mayor
- Dan Ziskie as City Planner
- Jerry Orbach as Businessman
- Martha Ryan as Nurse Yeager
- Pamela Stewart as Nurse Kohanek
- Frank Bongiorno as Judge
- Victor Rojas as Gangbanger
- Gregory Russell as Gangbanger
- Rick Gonzalez as Gangbanger
- Arthur Acuna as Gangbanger
- Ryan Bondoc as Gangbanger
- Jessica Feng as herself
- Keelan The Dog as Mutt The Dog

== Adaptation ==
Rhodes also adapted his own novel for Broadway in 1989, but the production, starring Jo Anne Worley, was so poorly received it closed after four performances. The production was directed and choreographed by Tony Tanner. The sets and costumes were designed by Michael Bottari and Ronald Case, who received many good reviews for their turntable set design. The Lighting Design was by Norman Coates. There was a production prior to the Broadway opening in Miami Beach that was directed by Bob Bogdanoff and starred Nannette Fabray. Many have thought that if Nannette Fabray stayed with the show, that the musical would have lasted longer. The Broadway production played at the Belasco Theater. In addition to JoAnne Worley, it starred a young Richard H. Blake, who would go on to become a familiar face on Broadway in such shows as The Wedding Singer, Saturday Night Fever, and Legally Blonde: The Musical. Anthony Galde (of Starlight Express-Broadway and 1st U.S. Tour, Film: Just One of the Guys) played the leader of the street gang.

== Production ==
Steven Seagal was initially scheduled to appear in the film before he withdrew on the advice of his Buddhist spiritual adviser. Harvey Keitel was subsequently cast in the role.
