= A Fox, a Rabbit, and a Cabbage =

- Fargo episode
- Episode no.: Season 1 Episode 9
- Directed by: Matt Shakman
- Written by: Noah Hawley
- Production code: XFO01009
- Original air date: June 10, 2014
- Running time: 53 minutes

Guest appearances
- Bob Odenkirk as Bill Oswalt; Keith Carradine as Lou Solverson; Keegan-Michael Key as FBI Agent Pepper; Jordan Peele as FBI Agent Budge; Joey King as Greta Grimly; Susan Park as Linda Park; Stephen Root as Burt Canton; Helena Mattsson as Jemma Stalone; Jennifer Copping as Louise Weezy Canton

Episode chronology
← Previous "The Heap"	Next → "Morton's Fork"
- Fargo (season 1)

"A Fox, a Rabbit, and a Cabbage" is the ninth and penultimate episode of the first season of the FX anthology series Fargo. The episode aired on June 10, 2014 in the United States on FX. It was written by series creator and showrunner Noah Hawley and directed by Matt Shakman. The episode title refers to a variation of the fox, goose and bag of beans puzzle.

The episode is set after the one-year ellipsis featured in the previous episode: Lorne Malvo (Billy Bob Thornton) now has a completely new life as a dentist known as "Mick Michaelson". However, his plans are compromised when Lester Nygaard (Martin Freeman) accidentally runs into him. Meanwhile, Gus Grimly (Colin Hanks), now a mailman, is happily married to Molly Solverson (Allison Tolman), whose theory that Lester was involved in the murders finds new supporters in FBI agents Pepper (Keegan-Michael Key) and Budge (Jordan Peele).

"A Fox, a Rabbit, and a Cabbage" received critical acclaim, and was seen by 1.90 million viewers.

== Plot ==
Lorne Malvo is now posing as a dentist named "Mick Michaelson" in Kansas City, Missouri. One night, Malvo, along with his fiancée, Jemma Stalone, throw a dinner party at his place, which is attended by his co-worker Dr. Burt and his wife, Louise. While Malvo and Burt have a chat over wine, Burt brings up his estranged brother, who he remains in contact with, even though he is not allowed to as the brother is currently under witness protection. Burt drunkenly suggests they go to Las Vegas to visit him and Malvo agrees.

In Las Vegas, Malvo sits at a table talking to Burt, Louise, and Jemma as Lester Nygaard watches from the bar. Burt tells Mike they will meet his brother tomorrow, but they cannot bring phones. Before Malvo can ask who is after his brother, Lester walks up to him and taps him on the shoulder. Malvo pretends not to recognize him, and suggests that the group leave. As they get into an elevator, Lester stops the elevator door, and demands that Malvo recognize him, at which point Malvo shoots Burt, Louise, and Jemma in the head. He tells Lester that he had been working Burt for six months in order to get to his brother, who apparently has a $100,000 bounty which has now gone to waste. Lester flees the scene and returns in a hurry to Minnesota.

Lester suggests to his wife Linda that they take a holiday to Acapulco; he intends to flee permanently to escape Malvo. They pack, but as they are about to leave, Molly arrives to ask about the murders in Vegas. Lester makes up a story, saying he never met anyone on his way back to the hotel room. Molly asks why they tried to board a plane at the last minute, and Linda backs up Lester's story by saying she was homesick. Molly tells them the Vegas PD will be sending over some security footage, so they should not leave town for a while. Meanwhile, Malvo arrives in town and searches for Lester.

That night, Lester buys two online plane tickets out of Minneapolis while still constantly looking over his shoulder for Malvo. He tells Linda they are leaving soon. She reminds him they need to stay in town, but Lester lies and says he talked with Molly and they are free to go. Before leaving town, Lester says they need to stop by the office to pick up some cash and their passports from the safe. In the parking lot, Lester notices a light on that he did not turn on. Suspicious, he sends Linda into the office wearing his coat to get what they came for. Malvo appears inside the office and shoots Linda in the back of her head, thinking her to be Lester. Realizing his mistake, Malvo exits the building and scans the parking lot for Lester. Seeing no one, he lights a cigarette and walks away as Lester nervously watches from a distance.

== Reception ==
=== Ratings ===
The episode first aired in the US on FX on June 10, 2014 and obtained 1.90 million viewers.

=== Critical reception ===
The episode was very well received among critics. It currently holds a perfect 100% rating on Rotten Tomatoes. The A.V. Club writers Zack Handlen and Emily VanDerWerff gave the episode an A rating. Another positive review came from IGN writer Roth Cornet, who gave the episode a 9.0/10 "amazing" rating.
