= The Rooster Prince (Fargo) =

- Fargo episode
- Episode no.: Season 1 Episode 2
- Directed by: Adam Bernstein
- Written by: Noah Hawley
- Editing by: Skip Macdonald
- Production code: XFO01002
- Original air date: April 22, 2014
- Running time: 51 minutes

Guest appearances
- Bob Odenkirk as Bill Oswalt; Keith Carradine as Lou Solverson; Oliver Platt as Stavros Milos; Gordon S. Miller as Dmitri Milos; Allegra Fulton as Helena Milos; Adam Goldberg as Mr. Numbers; Russell Harvard as Mr. Wrench; Glenn Howerton as Don Chumph; Joey King as Greta Grimly; Rachel Blanchard as Kitty Nygaard; Joshua Close as Chazz Nygaard; Spencer Drever as Gordo Nygaard; Peter Breitmayer as Ben Schmidt; Barry Flatman as Wally; Julie Ann Emery as Ida Thurman; Brian Markinson as Max Gold; Tom Musgrave as Bo Munk

Episode chronology
← Previous "The Crocodile's Dilemma"	Next → "A Muddy Road"
- Fargo season 1

"The Rooster Prince" is the second episode of the first season of the black comedy crime drama television series Fargo. The episode was written by series creator and showrunner Noah Hawley and directed by Adam Bernstein. It aired on FX in the United States on April 22, 2014. The title refers to the Jewish parable by Rabbi Nachman of Breslov of the same name.

In the episode, the Fargo mafia sends two hitmen, Mr. Wrench (Russell Harvard) and Mr. Numbers (Adam Goldberg), to find the man behind the murder of Sam Hess; the man in question, Lorne Malvo (Billy Bob Thornton), is hired by "Supermarket King" Stavros Milos (Oliver Platt) to find the author of blackmails he received. Meanwhile, Deputy Molly Solverson (Allison Tolman) heavily suspects that Lester Nygaard (Martin Freeman) is closely involved in the murder case, but is unable to convince new police chief Bill Oswalt (Bob Odenkirk) of it.

"The Rooster Prince" was acclaimed by critics, and was seen by 2.04 million viewers.

== Plot ==
Mr. Wrench and Mr. Numbers are two hitmen sent from Fargo to Bemidji looking for Sam Hess' killer. An associate named Max Gold points them to the strip club where he was killed and a dancer gives a description, and they abduct a man matching it. When they are later told he is not the one, they kill him by dropping him into an ice fishing hole.

Meanwhile, Bill Oswalt becomes the new police chief, and he and deputy Molly Solverson differ on suspects in Thurman's death. She believes Lester Nygaard is connected to the frozen man at the car accident and the killings of Sam Hess, Pearl Nygaard, and Thurman due to the fact that he was seen talking with Malvo about Hess. Bill believes that it was a drifter who killed Hess, Pearl and Thurman during a home invasion. They interrogate Nygaard, who claims that he does not remember, and Bill, a childhood friend of his, refuses to believe that Lester is capable of something so despicable. Nevertheless, Solverson continues to investigate Nygaard in his personal life over the matter and is removed from the case as a result.

In Duluth, Malvo is hired to find out who is blackmailing Stavros Milos, the "Supermarket King" of Minnesota. Milos believes his soon-to-be ex-wife might be the culprit. Malvo notices traces of tanning spray on the blackmail note, leading him to believe that the ex-wife's current boyfriend Don Chumph is the culprit. News of the events in Bemidji reach the Duluth Police Department, where Grimly realizes the car he stopped matches the one stolen there. Unsure of what to do, he converses with his daughter over a school assembly, where she says she would do anything to help, and Gus smiles and says he is proud of her.

== Reception ==
=== Ratings ===
The episode was first aired in the US on FX on April 22, 2014 and obtained 2.04 million viewers. The show was aired in the UK on Channel 4 on April 27, 2014 and was seen by 1.5 million viewers.

=== Critical reception ===
"The Rooster Prince" was acclaimed by critics. As of April 2017, it holds a perfect 100% rating on Rotten Tomatoes. The A.V. Club writer Emily VanDerWerff gave the episode a B+ rating, and said "The Rooster Prince is a bit of a step back from last week's riveting first episode, but the reasoning for that is sound: It's here that the show starts to truly differentiate itself from its cinematic forebear. The Crocodile’s Dilemma teases viewers with the idea that the series might be a remix of the movie before heading off on its own path by the end. The Rooster Prince is the episode where this thing settles both into being its own project and into being a TV show at all."

Another positive review came from IGN writer Roth Cornet, whose verdict was that "The second episode of FX’s Fargo gave us another provocative glimpse into Lorne Malvo’s fascinatingly depraved psyche, as Detective Solverson must fight the tide of ineptitude to engage in a proper investigation. As the game of cat and mouse develops between her and Lester and we are introduced to rich and entertainingly theatrical additional characters this world and story continues to leave me wanting more." The episode was given an 8.8/10 "great" rating.
