= Eating the Blame =

- Fargo episode
- Episode no.: Season 1 Episode 4
- Directed by: Randall Einhorn
- Written by: Noah Hawley
- Editing by: Skip Macdonald
- Production code: XFO01004
- Original air date: May 6, 2014
- Running time: 50 minutes

Guest appearances
- Bob Odenkirk as Bill Oswalt; Keith Carradine as Lou Solverson; Oliver Platt as Stavros Milos; Gordon S. Miller as Dmitri Milos; Carlos Díaz as Young Stavros; Eve Harlow as Young Helena; Adam Goldberg as Mr. Numbers; Russell Harvard as Mr. Wrench; Glenn Howerton as Don Chumph; Joshua Close as Chazz Nygaard; Chantal Perron as Cindy; Peter Breitmayer as Ben Schmidt; Barry Flatman as Wally

Episode chronology
← Previous "A Muddy Road"	Next → "The Six Ungraspables"
- Fargo season 1

"Eating the Blame" is the fourth episode of the first season of the black comedy crime drama television series Fargo. The episode was written by series creator and showrunner Noah Hawley and directed by Randall Einhorn. It first aired on FX in the United States on May 6, 2014. The title refers to the Zen Buddhist kōan of the same name.

In the episode, Lorne Malvo (Billy Bob Thornton) continues to torment his employer Stavros Milos (Oliver Platt), making him go through biblical plague-like events. Meanwhile, Lester Nygaard (Martin Freeman) desperately tries to escape the hitmen Mr. Wrench (Russell Harvard) and Mr. Numbers (Adam Goldberg). It establishes a direct link between the series and the 1996 film of the same name on which it is based.

"Eating the Blame" received critical acclaim, and was seen by 1.70 million viewers.

== Plot ==
In a flashback to 1987, the Milos family runs out of gas along a deserted highway in winter. Stranded and heavily in debt, Stavros Milos prays for help. Stepping outside the car, he finds a briefcase of money ($920,000) buried in the snow and takes it as a sign from God. The suitcase was actually buried by Carl Showalter who was later murdered without having revealed its location to anyone else.

Nineteen years later, Chumph, disguised as a plumber, tells Stavros that everything appears normal in his pipes, and suggests the shower of blood is similar to a biblical plague. Stavros grabs Chumph by the scruff of the neck and tells him off. Chumph tells him he is crazy and leaves, while Stavros worries about what Chumph said. Outside, Lorne Malvo was watching from a distance. Gus Grimly spots Malvo by Stavros' house and arrests him. He informs Molly Solverson, and when she requests to go to Duluth, Oswalt refuses her and goes instead. Malvo produces identification as "Frank Peterson," a Lutheran minister from Baudette, and has an alibi. Molly learns Malvo's name and calls Grimly, but Malvo (as Peterson) has already been released.

Malvo and Chumph release hundreds of crickets into Stavros's supermarket, simulating a plague of locusts, to further entice Stavros into paying the blackmail money. Meanwhile, Lester Nygaard is abducted by Numbers and Wrench who intend to kill him, but he escapes. Fleeing, he finds a police officer issuing a ticket for a car parked on the side of the road. Nygaard punches him to get arrested. Wrench and Numbers witness this and later stage a bar fight to get arrested, and end up in the same cell with Lester.

== Reception ==
=== Ratings ===
The episode was first aired in the US on FX on May 6, 2014 and obtained 1.70 million viewers. The show was aired in the UK on Channel 4 on May 11, 2014 and was seen by 1.3 million viewers.

=== Critical reception ===
The episode received critical acclaim. It currently holds a perfect 100% rating on Rotten Tomatoes. The A.V. Club writers Emily VanDerWerff and Zack Handlen gave the episode an A- rating. IGN's Roth Cornet gave the episode an 8.9/10 "great" rating and said "The fourth episode of Fargo gave us lots to chew on. What's great about this series is that it raises legitimately interesting questions about human nature, but it does so in an entirely entertaining package. It seems possible that we're watching Lester make a slow evolution from prey to predator, but Lorne Malvo - at present - remains the unequivocal alpha."
