= Who Shaves the Barber? =

- Fargo episode
- Episode no.: Season 1 Episode 7
- Directed by: Scott Winant
- Written by: Noah Hawley
- Editing by: Skip Macdonald
- Production code: XFO01007
- Original air date: May 27, 2014
- Running time: 48 minutes

Guest appearances
- Bob Odenkirk as Bill Oswalt; Keith Carradine as Lou Solverson; Keegan-Michael Key as FBI Agent Pepper; Jordan Peele as FBI Agent Budge; Kate Walsh as Gina Hess; Russell Harvard as Mr. Wrench; Rachel Blanchard as Kitty Nygaard; Joshua Close as Chazz Nygaard; Spencer Drever as Gordo Nygaard; Joey King as Greta Grimly; Brian Jensen as Mr. Rundle; James Binkley as Mr. Carlyle; Andy King as Mr. Jergen; Mark Acheson as Mr. Tripoli; Tom Musgrave as Bo Munk; Chantal Perron as Cindy

Episode chronology
← Previous "Buridan's Ass"	Next → "The Heap"
- Fargo (season 1)

"Who Shaves the Barber?" is the seventh episode of the first season of the FX anthology series Fargo. The episode aired on May 27, 2014, in the United States on FX. It was written by series creator and showrunner Noah Hawley and directed by Scott Winant. The title refers to the paradox in logic known as the barber paradox.

"Who Shaves the Barber?" deals with the consequences of the previous episode, "Buridan's Ass": while Molly Solverson (Allison Tolman) is badly injured after Gus Grimly (Colin Hanks) accidentally shot her, the seeds planted by Lester Nygaard (Martin Freeman) to put the blame of his involvement in the murders on his brother Chazz (Joshua Close) are bearing fruit.

The episode was very well received by critics, and was seen by 1.52 million viewers.

== Plot ==
At the hospital, Grimly agonizes over accidentally shooting Molly and destroying her spleen, but the injury is not fatal.

The unloaded gun Lester placed in Gordo's backpack is discovered at his school. The Nygaard home is searched by police and the incriminating evidence that Lester planted in Chazz's gun safe is found. Later, Lester tells Chief Oswalt a new story in which he claims Chazz killed Pearl during a heated lovers' quarrel. Lester also claims he was present when Chazz killed Chief Thurman, thus explaining his hand injury. He says he covered for his hot-headed brother because he feared retaliation. Lester is released from jail while Chazz is incarcerated.

Molly talks to Mr. Wrench, who is hospitalized under guard, and informs him that his partner, Mr. Numbers, is dead. Wrench, who is deaf, declines to provide any information.

Meanwhile, Lorne Malvo infiltrates the Fargo, North Dakota offices of the crime syndicate who sent Numbers and Wrench, and armed with the UMP-45 submachine gun that was used in his murder attempt, Malvo massacres the gang and its boss.

Lester seduces the money-hungry Mrs. Hess with promises of "greasing the palms" of the insurance agents responsible for her late husband's policy. Lester fails to mention that Hess had stopped paying the premiums and the policy was cancelled.

Molly is discharged from the hospital and returns to Bemidji. She is dismayed to hear that Chazz Nygaard has been arrested and that Lester has been "cleared."

== Reception ==
=== Ratings ===
The episode was first aired in the US on FX on May 27, 2014, and obtained 1.52 million viewers. The show was aired in the UK on Channel 4 on June 1, 2014, and was seen by 1.2 million viewers.

=== Critical reception ===
The critical response to the seventh episode of Fargo was very positive. It currently holds a "Fresh" 86% rating on Rotten Tomatoes, making it, however, the lowest-ranking episode of the season, tied with the previous episode "Buridan's Ass".

The A.V. Club writers Zack Handlen and Emily VanDerWerff gave the episode a B+ rating, noting the drop in excitement from the previous episode, but praising Freeman and Odenkirk's performances.

A more positive review came from IGN writer Roth Cornet, who gave the episode a 9.1/10 "amazing" rating and said "Overall, another great entry as FX's Fargo nears the climax of its 10-episode run. The series shines when it's truly standing on its own two feet and focusing on the characters that were created specifically for this world and this story. It stumbles a bit when it falls back on aping the Coen's classic film. However, those moments are relatively rare and there is far more to recommend in this nasty and comical study of human nature than not. As always, tonight's episode was fat with menace, humor, and evocative character evolutions."
