= Buridan's Ass (Fargo) =

- Fargo episode
- Episode no.: Season 1 Episode 6
- Directed by: Colin Bucksey
- Written by: Noah Hawley
- Production code: XFO01006
- Original air date: May 20, 2014
- Running time: 53 minutes

Guest appearances
- Adam Goldberg as Mr. Numbers; Russell Harvard as Mr. Wrench; Glenn Howerton as Don Chumph; Oliver Platt as Stavros Milos; Gordon S. Miller as Dmitri Milos; Rachel Blanchard as Kitty Nygaard; Joshua Close as Chazz Nygaard; Spencer Drever as Gordo Nygaard; Peter Breitmayer as Ben Schmidt; Barry Flatman as Wally; James Binkley as Mr. Carlyle; Andy King as Mr. Jergen; Mark Acheson as Mr. Tripoli

Episode chronology
← Previous "The Six Ungraspables"	Next → "Who Shaves the Barber?"
- Fargo (season 1)

"Buridan's Ass" is the sixth episode of the first season of the FX anthology series Fargo. The episode aired on May 20, 2014 in the United States on FX. It was written by series creator and showrunner Noah Hawley and directed by Colin Bucksey. The title refers to the paradox in logic known as Buridan's ass.

In the episode, Lorne Malvo (Billy Bob Thornton), police officers Molly Solverson (Allison Tolman) and Gus Grimly (Colin Hanks), and hitmen Mr. Wrench (Russell Harvard) and Mr. Numbers (Adam Goldberg) all end up involved in a chaotic and deadly shootout in the middle of a snow storm. Meanwhile, Lester Nygaard (Martin Freeman) tries to implicate someone else for the murders of his wife and Chief Thurman, while Stavros Milos's (Oliver Platt) torments come to an unforeseen conclusion.

"Buridan's Ass" was very well received by critics and was seen by 1.80 million viewers. It was nominated for three Primetime Emmy Awards, winning Outstanding Directing for a Limited Series, Movie, or Dramatic Special for Bucksey.

== Plot ==
Lorne Malvo has Don Chumph place the call to Stavros, who has the money ready for the drop. Malvo knocks Chumph unconscious and duct tapes him to an exercise bench in the entry way of his house. He also duct tapes an unloaded shotgun to his hands and proceeds to fire randomly into the neighborhood with another gun. Malvo quickly exits via the back door before police arrive. They are duped into firing upon and then storming the house, killing Chumph who is struggling wildly to get free of his bonds.

Molly Solverson is visiting Gus Grimly in Duluth to discuss the recent murders when gunshots are reported. At the scene they find a car wreck that Numbers and Wrench staged to trap Malvo. Numbers and Wrench then attack with automatic weapons; Malvo escapes the ambush and captures and tortures Numbers to tell him who sent them. Numbers replies, "Fargo" before Malvo fatally slits his throat. Gus, seeing an unknown silhouette in the snow, accidentally shoots Molly.

Meanwhile, Stavros goes back to the roadside where he originally found the briefcase of cash, and buries the blackmail money there, believing God has been punishing him. Feeling God's forgiveness, Stavros calls his bodyguard to bring his son, Dmitri, home from the remote hideout he was staying at. The stormy weather clears, but not before fish fall out of the sky in a freak occurrence caused by the storm, causing the bodyguard to flip the car, killing himself and Dmitri, a scene that Stavros happens upon on his drive home.

Back in Bemidji, Lester Nygaard manages to sneak out of the hospital, stealing a car. He takes the murder weapon, some photos of his wife, and a pair of her panties from his house, hides everything in his brother Chazz's hidden gun cabinet, and places one of his brother's handguns in his nephew Gordo's backpack, to ensure the police will search Chazz's house. As he leaves the house, Gordo sees him, but does not react. Lester then returns undetected to his hospital room, where a satisfied smile slowly creeps across his face.

== Reception ==
=== Ratings ===
The episode was first aired in the US on FX on May 20, 2014 and obtained 1.80 million viewers. The show was aired in the UK on Channel 4 on May 25, 2014 and was seen by 0.95 million viewers.

=== Critical reception ===
The episode was very well received by critics. It currently holds a "Fresh" 86% rating on Rotten Tomatoes, making it, however, the lowest-ranking episode of the season, tied with the following episode "Who Shaves the Barber?".

The A.V. Club writers Zack Handlen and Emily VanDerWerff gave the episode an A rating, complimenting Allison Tolman's performance and comparing Lester to Walter White from Breaking Bad.

Another positive review came from IGN writer Roth Cornet, who gave the episode a 9.3/10 "amazing" rating and said "Lester Nygaard continued his descent into a moral wasteland, Gus Grimly's ineptitude may have yielded tragic and deadly consequences, and Lorne Malvo escaped death in what was one of the most emotionally dark and visually pretty episodes of Fargo to date."

=== Accolades ===
At the 66th Primetime Emmy Awards, Colin Bucksey won the Primetime Emmy Award for Outstanding Directing for a Miniseries, Movie, or Dramatic Special for this episode.
