= The Six Ungraspables =

- Fargo episode
- Episode no.: Season 1 Episode 5
- Directed by: Colin Bucksey
- Written by: Noah Hawley
- Production code: XFO01005
- Original air date: May 13, 2014
- Running time: 50 minutes

Guest appearances
- Bob Odenkirk as Bill Oswalt; Keith Carradine as Lou Solverson; Oliver Platt as Stavros Milos; Gordon S. Miller as Dmitri Milos; Adam Goldberg as Mr. Numbers; Russell Harvard as Mr. Wrench; Kelly Holden Bashar as Pearl Nygaard; Shawn Doyle as Vern Thurman; Julie Ann Emery as Ida Thurman; Joey King as Greta Grimly; Chantal Perron as Cindy; Byron Noble as Ari Ziskind; Barry Flatman as Wally

Episode chronology
← Previous "Eating the Blame"	Next → "Buridan's Ass"
- Fargo season 1

"The Six Ungraspables" is the fifth episode of the first season of the black comedy crime drama television series Fargo. It was written by series creator and showrunner Noah Hawley and directed by Colin Bucksey. The episode aired on FX in the United States on May 13, 2014. The title refers to the Zen Buddhist kōan known as The Six Ungraspables.

In the episode, Lester Nygaard (Martin Freeman), trapped in a prison cell with the hitmen Mr. Wrench (Russell Harvard) and Mr. Numbers (Adam Goldberg) after the events of the previous episode, finally reveals that the man the duo is after is Lorne Malvo (Billy Bob Thornton). Meanwhile, Malvo, while continuing his scheme of blackmailing Stavros Milos (Oliver Platt), might be looking for revenge after Officer Gus Grimly (Colin Hanks) arrested him in the previous episode.

"The Six Ungraspables" received critical acclaim, and was seen by 1.60 million viewers.

== Plot ==
The episode starts with a flashback on how Lester Nygaard obtained the gun which eventually was used by Lorne Malvo to kill Vern Thurman during Lester's arrest at his own home.

While in the present in jail, Mr. Wrench and Mr. Numbers obtain Malvo's name from Lester. They are released but Lester, whose hand has become severely infected after being hit by one of the shotgun pellets that Malvo fired at Thurman, is taken to the hospital. Molly Solverson rides in the ambulance and tries to get more information from Lester, though he is slightly delirious. She presents her evidence to Chief Oswalt, who is beginning to realize that all the recent events are related.

With Stavros close to paying the blackmail demand, Malvo locks Chumph in his kitchen pantry overnight to prevent him from ruining the scheme. Malvo takes Stavros home and leaves. He spots Gus Grimly parked by the road near the house and later follows Grimly to his home, but is confronted in his car by Grimly's neighbor. He threatens the neighbor before driving away.

== Reception ==
=== Ratings ===
The episode was first aired in the US on FX on May 13, 2014 and obtained 1.60 million viewers. The show was aired in the UK on Channel 4 on May 18, 2014 and was seen by 1.0 million viewers.

=== Critical reception ===
The episode received critical acclaim. It currently holds a perfect 100% rating on Rotten Tomatoes.

The A.V. Club writers Emily VanDerWerff and Zack Handlen gave the episode an A rating, saying "(...) this episode was immensely enjoyable, although some of that enjoyment was tempered for me by a very deep concern that Gus was about to get shot," followed by "It's a good sign when a show can make you worry this much about someone so quickly."

Another positive review came from IGN's Roth Cornet, who gave the episode an "amazing" rating of 9.3/10 and said "Midway through Fargo’s 10-episode run, the series at large is revealing itself to be an elaborate and gorgeously crafted grim parable in its own right."
