= A Muddy Road =

- Fargo episode
- Episode no.: Season 1 Episode 3
- Directed by: Randall Einhorn
- Written by: Noah Hawley
- Editing by: Skip Macdonald
- Production code: XFO01003
- Original air date: April 29, 2014
- Running time: 48 minutes

Guest appearances
- Bob Odenkirk as Bill Oswalt; Keith Carradine as Lou Solverson; Kate Walsh as Gina Hess; Atticus Mitchell as Mickey Hess; Liam Green as Moe Hess; Kelly Holden Bashar as Pearl Nygaard; Shawn Doyle as Vern Thurman; Oliver Platt as Stavros Milos; Adam Goldberg as Mr. Numbers; Russell Harvard as Mr. Wrench; Glenn Howerton as Don Chumph; Joey King as Greta Grimly; Joshua Close as Chazz Nygaard; Dave Trimble as Phil McCormick; Catherine Forbes as Barbara; Peter Breitmayer as Ben Schmidt; Barry Flatman as Wally; Graham Littlefield as Deputy Auerbach; Barbara Gates Wilson as Lindey Snuth; Brian Markinson as Max Gold; Susan Park as Linda Park; Tom Musgrave as Bo Munk

Episode chronology
← Previous "The Rooster Prince"	Next → "Eating the Blame"
- Fargo season 1

"A Muddy Road" is the third episode of the first season of the black comedy crime drama television series Fargo. The episode was written by series creator and showrunner Noah Hawley and directed by Randall Einhorn. It aired on FX in the United States on April 29, 2014. The title refers to the Zen Buddhist kōan of the same name.

In the episode, Lester Nygaard (Martin Freeman) starts realizing that his involvement in the murders might soon be uncovered, as both Deputy Molly Solverson (Allison Tolman) and hitmen Mr. Wrench (Russell Harvard) and Mr. Numbers (Adam Goldberg) have set their sights on him. Meanwhile, Lorne Malvo (Billy Bob Thornton) gives his employer Stavros Milos (Oliver Platt)'s blackmailing affair an unexpected twist.

The episode was acclaimed by critics, and was seen by 1.87 million viewers.

== Plot ==
After being removed from the Hess case, Molly investigates the original car crash and the frozen man in the woods, and learns he was dragged from his workplace in Saint Paul by Malvo, allegedly because the man had a massive gambling debt. She obtains a still from the building's security cameras showing the abduction, but Malvo's face is partially obscured. Lester returns to work and calls on Gina Hess, Sam's widow, about his life insurance policy. She unexpectedly starts flirting with him in an attempt to get more money, unaware that Mr. Wrench and Mr. Numbers are watching from outside. Convinced he killed Hess, they later visit Lester's office and threaten him, but leave when Molly unexpectedly arrives. Molly claims that she is interested in a life insurance policy and "accidentally" shows Lester the abduction photo containing Malvo's face. Lester's reaction convinces her that he recognizes Malvo.

Molly tells Bill Oswalt about her visit to Lester, but he is only more upset that Molly is still harassing Lester. Meanwhile, Malvo informs Don Chumph, the fitness instructor for Stavros's wife, that he knows he is the blackmailer. Malvo takes over the blackmail scheme and torments Stavros by exploiting his extreme religious beliefs. He kills Stavros' dog, replaces his pain medication with Adderall, and sabotages the plumbing system, causing pig blood to flow out of the shower.

Gus finally tells his angry superior that he let Malvo off with a warning for speeding, and he is sent to Bemidji to inform their police department. He meets Molly for the first time and after seeing him with Greta, she invites them over to her father's restaurant where they share a friendly conversation.

== Reception ==
=== Ratings ===
The episode was first aired in the US on FX on April 29, 2014 and obtained 1.87 million viewers. The show was aired in the UK on Channel 4 on May 4, 2014 and was seen by 1.17 million viewers.

=== Critical reception ===
The third episode of Fargo was acclaimed by critics. It currently holds a perfect 100% rating on Rotten Tomatoes.

The A.V. Club writers Emily VanDerWerff and Zack Handlen gave the episode an A- rating, and said "The sheer amount of balance that Fargo projects makes it all the more exciting when things rush forward helter-skelter (as when Molly shows Gus the photo of Malvo) or when unpredictable elements enter to clog up the story. In the latter category, we have those two hitmen from Fargo, while in the former, we have whatever Malvo is doing to hem in Stavros (which involves switching out his medication for Adderall and putting pig’s blood in his water supply for reasons I have yet to fathom). Yet Noah Hawley is careful to always balance out advances on both sides, so the whole thing feels like a complicated chess game either side could win—even if Molly and Malvo don’t precisely know they’re playing each other yet."

Another positive review came from IGN's Roth Cornet, who gave the episode an 8.8/10 "great" rating and said "There are some amazing sight gags throughout the episodes (...) but that light and fanciful music set against grim corpses and barbarous crime is what really sells the tone. It's that simultaneously disquieting and entirely engaging tenor that gives us enough distance to laugh even in the midst of the horror. It's a delicate balance, because the show, like the film, also selects moments to force us to really feel and face the brutality they're serving up."
