= The Heap (Fargo) =

- Fargo episode
- Episode no.: Season 1 Episode 8
- Directed by: Scott Winant
- Written by: Noah Hawley
- Production code: XFO01008
- Original air date: June 3, 2014
- Running time: 53 minutes

Guest appearances
- Bob Odenkirk as Bill Oswalt; Keith Carradine as Lou Solverson; Joey King as Greta Grimly; Kate Walsh as Gina Hess; Russell Harvard as Mr. Wrench; Tom Musgrave as Bo Munk; Stephen Root as Burt Canton; Helena Mattsson as Jemma Stalone; Julie Ann Emery as Ida Thurman; Rachel Blanchard as Kitty Nygaard; Susan Park as Linda Park; Keegan-Michael Key as FBI Agent Budge; Jordan Peele as FBI Agent Pepper; Liam Green as Moe Hess; Atticus Mitchell as Mickey Hess; Christopher Rosamond as Agent Buchwald; Jennifer Copping as Louise Weezy Canton; Barkhad Abdirahman as Tahir El Kachief

Episode chronology
← Previous "Who Shaves the Barber?"	Next → "A Fox, a Rabbit, and a Cabbage"
- Fargo (season 1)

"The Heap" is the eighth episode of the first season of the FX anthology series Fargo. The episode aired on June 3, 2014 in the United States on FX. It was written by series creator and showrunner Noah Hawley and directed by Scott Winant. The title refers to the paradox in logic known as the paradox of the heap.

In the episode, Lester Nygaard (Martin Freeman), having successfully framed his brother Chazz for the murders, finds newborn strength and decides to start his life anew. It also features a one-year ellipsis, during which the lives of all main characters have radically changed.

The episode was acclaimed by critics, and was seen by 1.86 million viewers.

== Plot ==
Following his brother Chazz Nygaard's arrest, Lester Nygaard consoles his sister-in-law, Kitty, who believes her husband is guilty. Shortly afterward, Lester tosses out Pearl's belongings, beginning a new life. Later, Gina Hess angrily storms into Lester's office, demanding payment from Sam's insurance policy and accusing Lester of having duped her and taken advantage of her sexually. Lester initially pretends he will make some calls on her behalf, but when her sons try to bully Lester, he hits them with a stapler, which in turn intimidates all three of the surviving Hess family members, and they back off. Additionally, Lester tells Mrs. Hess that Sam's having stopped paying the premium on the policy indicates she won't get paid. Lester's dominant performance impresses his coworker Linda.

Meanwhile, Molly Solverson returns to work and unsuccessfully attempts to reopen the Lester Nygaard investigation. At the Duluth hospital, Lorne Malvo kills a police guard and gives Mr. Wrench the handcuff key to escape, telling him that he and Mr. Numbers came closer than anyone else ever had to besting Malvo. Malvo confesses that he killed Mr. Numbers and tells Wrench to come find him if he still wants revenge. In Fargo, FBI Agents Pepper and Budge, having been assigned to surveillance during Malvo's 22-homicide gun rampage and missed his having walked right by their car en route to entering the building, are demoted to file clerks.

A year passes, and Gus Grimly, now a mailman, is happily married to Molly as they eagerly await their first child's birth. In Las Vegas, Lester, who has married Linda, receives an award for Insurance Salesman of the Year. While at the hotel bar, Lester spots Malvo, who now sports grey hair and a goatee rather than brown hair and a full beard. While conversing with his companions, Malvo calls himself "Dr. Michaelson".

== Reception ==
=== Ratings ===
The episode was first aired in the US on FX on June 3, 2014 and obtained 1.86 million viewers. The show was aired in the UK on Channel 4 on June 8, 2014 and was seen by 1.2 million viewers.

=== Critical reception ===
The episode was acclaimed by critics. It currently holds a perfect 100% rating on Rotten Tomatoes.

The A.V. Club writers Zack Handlen and Emily Todd VanDerWerff gave the episode an A- rating.

Another positive review came from IGN writer Roth Cornet, who gave the episode a 9.1/10 "amazing" rating.

=== Analysis ===
The episode title refers to the paradox in logic known as the paradox of the heap. Agent Budge references the paradox within the episode when, deeply bored after a year of file room duty, he wonders aloud to Pepper at what point taking files out of the room would make it no longer the file room.

The New York Times reviewer, Kate Phillips, also notes the similarities between "an obscure comic book icon who, in one version, morphs from dirt and swampish things into a monster, much as Lester Nygaard survived by adopting the chameleonesque traits more familiar to Lorne Malvo, the dark lord and monster of this entire montage".

While in bed, Molly is watching the comedy mystery detective film Detective Kitty O'Day (1944).
