= Morton's Fork (Fargo) =

- Fargo episode
- Episode no.: Season 1 Episode 10
- Directed by: Matt Shakman
- Written by: Noah Hawley
- Editing by: Skip Macdonald
- Production code: XFO01010
- Original air date: June 17, 2014
- Running time: 62 minutes

Guest appearances
- Bob Odenkirk as Bill Oswalt; Keith Carradine as Lou Solverson; Keegan-Michael Key as FBI Agent Budge; Jordan Peele as FBI Agent Pepper; Joey King as Greta Grimly; Susan Park as Linda Park

Episode chronology
← Previous "A Fox, a Rabbit, and a Cabbage"	Next → "Waiting for Dutch"
- Fargo (season 1)

"Morton's Fork" is the tenth and final episode of the first season of the FX anthology series Fargo. The episode aired on June 17, 2014 in the United States on FX. It was written by series creator and showrunner Noah Hawley and directed by Matt Shakman. The title refers to a dilemma of the same name, posed in the episode by FBI agents Pepper (Keegan-Michael Key) and Budge (Jordan Peele).

As each season of Fargo follows a different story and characters, the season finale is the conclusion of all storylines developed thus far. In "Morton's Fork", Lester Nygaard (Martin Freeman) desperately tries to escape Lorne Malvo (Billy Bob Thornton), who is hunting him, while also trying to stop the police and Deputy Molly Solverson (Allison Tolman) from uncovering his involvement in murders past and present.

The episode was acclaimed by critics, and was seen by 1.98 million viewers.

== Plot ==
The episode opens up showing the aftermath of a snowmobile crash. From the snowmobile, a trail of footprints is seen in the snow leading to a hole in a frozen lake.

Back in the parking lot outside Lester Nygaard's workplace, Lester watches as Lorne Malvo exits the building after having killed his second wife Linda. Once Lorne leaves the scene, Lester goes into the office in order to get the money from the safe. Before leaving, he covers up the crime scene in order to make it look like he was never there. He then attempts to give himself an alibi by going to Lou Solverson's diner, pretending to use the bathroom but anonymously calling Bemidji's police station to report shots being fired near his office. Speaking with Lester, Lou mentions that someone was looking for him. As police cars rush past the diner, Lester realizes that he had left the airplane tickets to Acapulco in the jacket he gave to Linda before she went into the office.

At home, Molly Solverson learns of the murder. She goes to the crime scene where she meets Lester. Lester tries but fails to retrieve the tickets from the jacket. The police bring Lester back to the station, where he refuses to answer any questions. Lester is allowed to return home the next morning, but must be accompanied by FBI agents Pepper and Budge.

Malvo goes to a used car lot and talks to a salesmen about one car that resembles an undercover police car, requesting a test drive. Malvo later sees Lester being taken home by the FBI agents, and follows in his own car. During his trip home, Lester is asked about and solves the riddle of the fox, the rabbit and the cabbage. Once they return Lester home, the two FBI agents remain outside. Forced by Malvo, the salesman drives his car up to Lester's house, attracting the attention of the agents; Malvo takes advantage of their distraction to murder both of them. The driver begs to be let go.

Lester notices the trail of blood outside, and runs upstairs to hide. Malvo enters Lester's house, and follows his voice to his bedroom. Malvo's foot is caught in a bear trap left by Lester hidden underneath a pile of clothing on the floor. They fire at each other, but both miss. Lester's gun jams, and while he retreats to the bathroom, Malvo escapes severely injured.

Malvo retreats to his cabin to treat his injury, not knowing that Grimly has already found him. Grimly tells Malvo that he has solved his riddle posed a year earlier, and kills Malvo by shooting him five times. When the police arrive, they find Malvo's trove of audiotapes, including the one containing Lester's confession to the murder of his first wife.

Two weeks later, Lester, now the subject of a manhunt after his murder of Pearl has been revealed, is pursued by law enforcement officers in Glacier National Park, only to crash his snowmobile. Desperate, he continues on foot, but falls through the thin ice, leaving his hat floating on top of the water and revealing that the scene shown at the beginning of the episode depicted his death.

At home, Molly receives the news of Lester. Gus tells her that he is receiving a citation for bravery, but he feels that she deserves it. Molly reassures her husband that this is his moment.

== Production ==
The episode's score features the Norwegian folk song "The Lost Sheep" ("Den bortkomne sauen" in Norwegian), which was the main theme of the original film.

== Reception ==
=== Ratings ===
The episode was first aired in the US on FX on June 17, 2014 and obtained 1.98 million viewers.

=== Critical reception ===
The episode was acclaimed by critics. It currently holds a perfect 100% rating on Rotten Tomatoes.

The A.V. Club writers Zack Handlen and Emily VanDerWerff gave the episode a B+ rating.

Another positive review came from IGN writer Roth Cornet, who gave the episode a 9.5/10 "amazing" rating.
