= Fargo season 1 =

2014 season of American crime anthology TV series

Fargo
- Season 1
- Promotional poster
- Starring: Billy Bob Thornton; Allison Tolman; Colin Hanks; Martin Freeman
- No. of episodes: 10

Release
- Original network: FX
- Original release: April 15 – June 17, 2014

Season chronology
- Next → Season 2

The first season of the American black comedy crime drama television series Fargo, retroactively billed as Fargo: Year One, aired on FX from April 15 to June 17, 2014, totaling ten episodes. The series is an anthology about violent crime in the American Midwest, with each season acting as a self-contained story within the show's shared continuity. Set between January 2006 and February 2007, the first season follows psychopathic hitman Lorne Malvo who stops in Bemidji, Minnesota and influences a mild-mannered salesman to give in to his most violent impulses. Their meeting sets forth a series of murders across the state and an ensuing investigation conducted by two police deputies.

The season was produced by FX Productions and MGM Television, with Noah Hawley serving as showrunner. Hawley wrote all ten episodes, titling each one after a famous parable or metaphorical dilemma. Filming took place in Calgary, Alberta, from late 2013 and to 2014. The season features an ensemble cast led by Billy Bob Thornton, Allison Tolman, Colin Hanks, and Martin Freeman. It also includes Bob Odenkirk, Keith Carradine, Joey King, Oliver Platt, Glenn Howerton, Kate Walsh, Russell Harvard, Adam Goldberg, Keegan-Michael Key, and Jordan Peele in recurring roles.

The first season of Fargo received widespread critical acclaim, praising its writing, directing and the performances of Thornton, Tolman, Hanks and Freeman. It was nominated for 18 Primetime Emmy Awards, and won the awards for Outstanding Miniseries, Outstanding Directing, and Outstanding Casting. It was also nominated for 5 Golden Globe Award, winning Best Miniseries or Television Film and Best Actor – Miniseries or TV Film for Thornton.

== Cast ==
=== Main ===
- Billy Bob Thornton as Lorne Malvo, a hitman with a violent and deceptive nature, who crashes his car in Bemidji, Minnesota, while passing through.
- Allison Tolman as Deputy Molly Solverson, a police officer from Bemidji who is hot on the case of Malvo and Nygaard.
- Colin Hanks as Officer Gus Grimly, a kindly officer from Duluth, Minnesota, who meets Malvo after stopping him for speeding.
- Martin Freeman as Lester Nygaard, a henpecked life insurance salesman from Bemidji who meets Malvo in the hospital after an encounter with a childhood bully.

=== Recurring ===
- Bob Odenkirk as Bill Oswalt, the naïve police chief in Bemidji.
- Keith Carradine as Lou Solverson, Molly's father, a former state cop who now runs a coffee shop.
- Kate Walsh as Gina Hess, Sam Hess' alcoholic widow.
- Josh Close as Chazz Nygaard, Lester's more successful younger brother.
- Joey King as Greta Grimly, Gus' daughter.
- Brian Markinson as Max Gold, Sam Hess' attorney.
- Kelly Holden Bashar as Pearl Nygaard, Lester's verbally abusive wife.
- Tom Musgrave as Bo Munk, the head of the insurance company where Lester works.
- Julie Ann Emery as Ida Thurman, Chief Thurman's pregnant wife.
- Rachel Blanchard as Kitty Nygaard, Chazz's wife.
- Atticus Mitchell and Liam Green as Mickey and Moe Hess, Sam's dimwitted sons.
- Spencer Drever as Gordo Nygaard, Chazz's young son who has autism.
- Russell Harvard and Adam Goldberg as Mr. Wrench and Mr. Numbers, two hitmen - the former of whom is deaf - sent by the Fargo mob to find Hess' killer.
- Oliver Platt as Stavros Milos, a staunchly religious supermarket tycoon whom Malvo begins to extort.
- Glenn Howerton as Don Chumph, the personal trainer of Stavros' ex-wife, whom Malvo ropes into his extortion scheme.
- Peter Breitmayer as Ben Schmidt, Gus' senior lieutenant in the Duluth police department.
- Barry Flatman as Wally Semenchko, Stavros' enforcer.
- Susan Park as Linda Park, Lester's co-worker at Munk Insurance, who harbors feelings for him.
- Keegan-Michael Key and Jordan Peele as Bill Budge and Webb Pepper, two incompetent FBI special agents who unknowingly cross paths with Malvo.
- Stephen Root as Burt Canton, a dentist whom Malvo befriends under a cover identity.
- Helena Mattsson as Jemma Stalone, Malvo's fiancee.

=== Guest stars ===
- Kevin O'Grady as Sam Hess, Lester's childhood bully and a truck salesman with affiliations to the Fargo mob.
- Shawn Doyle as Chief Vern Thurman, the trusted leader of the Bemidji police force.
- Carlos Diaz as young Stavros Milos
- Allegra Fulton as Helena Milos, Stavros' ex-wife.
- Eve Harlow as young Helena Milos

== Episodes ==
No. overall	No. in season	Title	Directed by	Written by	Original release date	Prod. code	U.S. viewers (millions)
1	1	"The Crocodile's Dilemma"	Adam Bernstein	Noah Hawley	April 15, 2014	XFO01001	2.65
In January 2006, Lorne Malvo hits a deer while driving on a highway outside Bemidji, Minnesota. A nearly naked man escapes from the trunk and runs into the woods. In town, insurance salesman Lester Nygaard runs into his childhood bully Sam Hess, who intimidates Lester and causes him to break his nose. Lester meets Malvo in the hospital and tells him about Hess; Malvo casually suggests murdering him, which Lester neither approves nor rejects. Malvo later kills Hess, telling Lester he never said no to the idea. Police chief Vern Thurman and police officer Molly Solverson discover the bodies of both Hess and Malvo's kidnapped man, and learn that Lester was overheard discussing Hess with Malvo. At his house, Lester gets into an argument with his verbally abusive wife, Pearl, and impulsively kills her with a hammer. Vern arrives to question him, but Malvo, whom Lester summoned to help, kills Vern and disappears. Lester knocks himself out to make the killings look like a home invasion. In Duluth, Malvo is pulled over for speeding by officer Gus Grimly, but threatens Gus into letting him go.
2	2	"The Rooster Prince"	Adam Bernstein	Noah Hawley	April 22, 2014	XFO01002	2.04
Mr. Wrench and Mr. Numbers, two hitmen, arrive in Bemidji searching for Hess' killer. Hess's attorney directs them to a strip club with a description of Malvo. After abducting the wrong man, Wrench and Numbers drop him into an ice fishing hole. Meanwhile, Bill Oswalt is promoted to police chief, and he and Molly immediately clash over suspects. She suspects Lester is connected to the driver in the car accident as well as the murders of Hess, Pearl, and Vern; Oswalt believes a lone drifter was responsible. In Duluth, Stavros Milos, the "Supermarket King" of Minnesota, hires Malvo to uncover who is blackmailing him. News about the Bemidji murders reaches the Duluth Police Department, and Gus realizes the car he pulled over could have been tied to it.
3	3	"A Muddy Road"	Randall Einhorn	Noah Hawley	April 29, 2014	XFO01003	1.87
Molly learns that the frozen man found in the woods had been abducted from his workplace in St. Paul, probably due to gambling debts; a security camera image shows the kidnapper's partially obscured face. Wrench and Numbers observe Lester meeting Gina Hess, Sam's widow, regarding Sam's life insurance policy. They later visit Lester's office to interrogate him, but leave when Molly unexpectedly arrives. Molly lets Lester glimpse Malvo's photo, and his reaction convinces her he recognizes him. Malvo identifies Don Chumph, Mrs. Milos' fitness instructor, as Stavros' blackmailer. He takes over the blackmail scheme and begins exploiting Stavros' staunch religious beliefs, killing Stavros' dog, replacing his medication with Adderall, and causing pig's blood to flow out of Stavros' shower head. Gus finally reports to his lieutenant that he let Malvo off for speeding, then visits Bemidji to discuss the murders with Molly.
4	4	"Eating the Blame"	Randall Einhorn	Noah Hawley	May 6, 2014	XFO01004	1.70
In 1987, the Milos family car runs out of gas along a deserted highway in winter. Heavily in debt, Stavros prays for help. Stepping outside the car, he finds a satchel filled with money buried in the snow. In 2006, Malvo continues terrorizing Stavros and leads him to believe himself subject to biblical plagues. Gus spots Malvo near Stavros' house and arrests him. He calls Molly to Duluth, but Chief Oswalt overrules her and goes instead. Malvo provides documentation identifying himself as a Christian minister with a plausible alibi, leading to his release; Gus confronts him as he leaves. Numbers and Wrench kidnap Lester, but he escapes and assaults a nearby police officer to get arrested and taken to safety. Wrench and Numbers later get themselves arrested and placed in Lester's cell.
5	5	"The Six Ungraspables"	Colin Bucksey	Noah Hawley	May 13, 2014	XFO01005	1.60
In jail, Wrench and Numbers forcefully obtain Malvo's name from Lester. They are released, but Lester is taken to the hospital with a severe infection from a stray shotgun pellet that struck his hand when Vern was shot by Malvo. Lester had been concealing the wound, knowing it proves he was in the room when Vern was killed. With this new evidence, Molly convinces Oswalt that the recent events are related. With Stavros close to paying the blackmail demand, Malvo locks Chumph in Chumph's kitchen pantry overnight to prevent him from ruining the scheme. After Malvo drives Stavros home, he spots Gus parked near the house and follows him home. Outside, Malvo is confronted by Gus' neighbor, whom Malvo threatens before driving away.
6	6	"Buridan's Ass"	Colin Bucksey	Noah Hawley	May 20, 2014	XFO01006	1.80
Malvo has Chumph call Stavros, who is ready to pay off the ransom. Malvo then restrains Chumph to a bench in his entryway, tapes an unloaded shotgun in his hands, then uses a rifle to fire randomly into the neighborhood. He leaves before police storm the house, killing Chumph. In Duluth, Molly and Gus are alerted to gunshots and arrive at a car wreck staged by Wrench and Numbers to trap Malvo. A gunfight ensues amidst a snowy whiteout. Malvo ambushes Numbers, forces him to reveal who hired him, then kills him. A blinded Gus hears shots and accidentally shoots Molly. Stavros buries the blackmail money in the same spot he found the satchel of cash. He believes God has now forgiven him for having taken the satchel, but later discovers his bodyguard and son have been killed in a freak auto accident. In Bemidji, Lester sneaks out of the hospital and plants the murder weapon and other incriminating evidence in his brother Chazz's gun cabinet after Chazz disowns him. He also places an unloaded handgun in his nephew Gordo's backpack, then returns undetected to his hospital room.
7	7	"Who Shaves the Barber?"	Scott Winant	Noah Hawley	May 27, 2014	XFO01007	1.52
The gun Lester placed in Gordo's backpack is discovered at his school, prompting police to search Chazz's home and discover the evidence Lester planted. Lester concocts a story to the police framing Chazz for Pearl and Vern's murders, leading to Chazz's incarceration and Lester's release. Lester later seduces Gina Hess with false promises of inflating her payout from Sam's insurance policy, despite knowing it was cancelled. An injured Molly questions a hospitalized Wrench and tells him Numbers is dead, but Wrench, who is deaf, refuses to cooperate. Malvo travels to Fargo, North Dakota and murders 22 people associated with Wrench and Numbers' employers; the two FBI agents stationed nearby notice the scene too late.
8	8	"The Heap"	Scott Winant	Noah Hawley	June 3, 2014	XFO01008	1.86
Lester gains a newfound confidence after evading justice for the murders, throwing away Pearl's belongings and starting a new life. Gina, accompanied by her two sons, storms into Lester's office demanding payment from Sam's cancelled insurance policy, but Lester sternly rebuffs her and the two boys, impressing his coworker Linda Park. Molly returns to work and unsuccessfully attempts to reopen the investigation into Lester. In Duluth, Malvo kills a police guard then tells Wrench that he killed Numbers, giving him the keys to his handcuffs and encouraging him to try avenging Numbers' death in the future. In Fargo, FBI agents Budge and Pepper, who were on surveillance during Malvo's rampage, are demoted to filing clerks. A year later, Gus, now a mailman, is happily married to Molly, who is pregnant. In Las Vegas, Lester, who has married Linda, receives an award for salesman of the year. While at the hotel bar, he spots Malvo, who has changed his appearance and name.
9	9	"A Fox, a Rabbit, and a Cabbage"	Matt Shakman	Noah Hawley	June 10, 2014	XFO01009	1.90
Lester confronts Malvo, following him and his companions into the elevator and demanding that Malvo acknowledge him. Instead, Malvo kills his two friends and his new fiancee, furious that Lester made him blow his cover and cost him a large bounty. Lester strikes Malvo with his award and escapes the hotel with Linda, insisting they immediately fly home. The next day, the Las Vegas police department reviews hotel surveillance footage and calls the Bemidji police to report Lester as a witness in the murders. Molly interviews Lester at his new house, but he pleads ignorance. In Fargo, Budge and Pepper act on a new tip from Molly regarding Malvo and travel to Bemidji to meet with her, where they are impressed by the evidence she has amassed. Malvo arrives in Bemidji, where Gus briefly spots him driving by. Lester hastily arranges a vacation with Linda; the two stop by his office to retrieve their passports and cash, but Lester, fearing Malvo's presence, sends Linda into the office wearing his hooded jacket. He watches Malvo shoot Linda after mistaking her for Lester.
10	10	"Morton's Fork"	Matt Shakman	Noah Hawley	June 17, 2014	XFO01010	1.98
Lester erases evidence of his presence from the scene of Linda's murder before anonymously calling the police to report gunshots. The police discover Linda's body and question Lester before releasing him. Molly's father Lou, a retired cop turned coffee shop owner, tells Gus that Malvo may be back in Bemidji. Gus later spots Malvo exit a cabin and drive away. Budge and Pepper drive Lester home, unaware that Malvo is following them in a car stolen from a dealership. The agents remain on watch outside Lester's house, but Malvo ambushes and kills them both. Lester hides from Malvo and sets a bear trap in his bedroom that maims Malvo's leg, forcing him to flee the house. Malvo returns to his cabin to treat his injury, but Gus surprises Malvo and, just before the latter can try to speak, Gus shoots him in the face and kills him. He later shows Molly a briefcase containing Malvo's various tape recordings, including that of Lester confessing to killing Pearl. Two weeks later, police track Lester to Montana, where he attempts to flee, only to fall through thin ice to his death. Molly is informed of the scene at home, where she and Gus celebrate the end of the case.

== Production ==
In 2012, it was announced that FX, with the Coen brothers as executive producers, was developing a new television series based on the 1996 Academy Award-winning film Fargo. It was later announced that adaptation would be a 10-episode limited series.

Series creator Noah Hawley served as the sole writer for all ten episodes of the season, while the task of directing was given to Adam Bernstein, Randall Einhorn, Colin Bucksey, Scott Winant and Matt Shakman. On August 2, 2013, it was announced that Billy Bob Thornton had signed on to star in the series. On September 27, 2013, Martin Freeman also signed on to star. On October 3, 2013, it was announced that Colin Hanks was cast in the role of Duluth police officer Gus Grimly. Production began in fall 2013 with filming taking place in and around Calgary, Alberta.

The season featured many guest appearances, such as Bob Odenkirk, Adam Goldberg, Russell Harvard, Oliver Platt, Glenn Howerton, Keegan-Michael Key, Jordan Peele, Keith Carradine, Kate Walsh, Julie Ann Emery, Rachel Blanchard, Joshua Close, Susan Park, Gary Valentine, Stephen Root and Shawn Doyle.

== Reception ==
=== Critical response ===
The first season of Fargo received critical acclaim. It holds a Metacritic score of 85 out of 100 based on 40 reviews, indicating "universal acclaim". On Rotten Tomatoes, it has a 97% rating based on 140 reviews, with an average rating of 8.45/10. The site's summary says that "Fargo presents more quirky characters and a new storyline that is expertly executed with dark humor and odd twists."

Robert Bianco of USA Today gave it a highly positive review, praising the performances of the cast and "the depth of its characterizations and the individuality of its approach." Brian Tallerico of RogerEbert.com acclaimed the series and wrote, "With an amazing ensemble driven by great performances from top to bottom, an incredibly smart writers' room, brilliant callbacks to the original that feel more inspired than forced, and a filmmaking style that feels as cinematic as this grand Minnesotan tragedy deserves, Fargo is one of the most addictive new shows of the year." However, Emily Nussbaum of The New Yorker criticized the series for its sexualized violence and its lack of ambiguity and pathos.

=== Accolades ===
Year	Association	Category	Nominated artist/work	Result
2014	15th American Film Institute Awards			
2014	15th American Film Institute Awards	Television Program of the Year	Fargo	Won
2014	Crime Thriller Awards		Fargo	
2014	Crime Thriller Awards	Best International TV Series	Fargo	Nominated
2014	Crime Thriller Awards	Best Leading Actor	Martin Freeman	Nominated
2014	Crime Thriller Awards	Best Supporting Actor	Billy Bob Thornton	Nominated
2014	4th Critics' Choice Television Awards			
2014	4th Critics' Choice Television Awards	Best Miniseries	Fargo	Won
2014	4th Critics' Choice Television Awards	Best Actor in a Movie or Miniseries	Martin Freeman	Nominated
2014	4th Critics' Choice Television Awards	Best Actor in a Movie or Miniseries	Billy Bob Thornton	Won
2014	4th Critics' Choice Television Awards	Best Supporting Actor in a Movie or Miniseries	Colin Hanks	Nominated
2014	4th Critics' Choice Television Awards	Best Supporting Actress in a Movie or Miniseries	Allison Tolman	Won
2014	Gold Derby TV Awards			
2014	Gold Derby TV Awards	Best Movie/Miniseries	Fargo	Won
2014	Gold Derby TV Awards	Best Movie/Mini Actor	Billy Bob Thornton	Nominated
2014	Gold Derby TV Awards	Best Movie/Mini Actor	Martin Freeman	Nominated
2014	Gold Derby TV Awards	Performer of the Year	Martin Freeman	Nominated
2014	Gold Derby TV Awards	Best Movie/Mini Supporting Actor	Colin Hanks	Nominated
2014	Gold Derby TV Awards	Best Movie/Mini Supporting Actor	Bob Odenkirk	Nominated
2014	Gold Derby TV Awards	Best Movie/Mini Supporting Actress	Allison Tolman	Won
2014	Gold Derby TV Awards	Breakthrough Performer of the Year	Allison Tolman	Won
2014	Joey Awards			
2014	Joey Awards	Young Actor – Age 12 or Younger in a TV Series Drama – Supporting/Recurring	Spencer Drever	Won
2014	18th Online Film & TV Association Awards			
2014	18th Online Film & TV Association Awards	Best Miniseries	Fargo	Won
2014	18th Online Film & TV Association Awards	Best Ensemble in a Motion Picture or Miniseries	Fargo	Nominated
2014	18th Online Film & TV Association Awards	Best Direction of a Motion Picture or Miniseries	Fargo	Nominated
2014	18th Online Film & TV Association Awards	Best Writing of a Motion Picture or Miniseries	Fargo	Nominated
2014	18th Online Film & TV Association Awards	Best Music in a Non-Series	Fargo	Nominated
2014	18th Online Film & TV Association Awards	Best Editing in a Non-Series	Fargo	Nominated
2014	18th Online Film & TV Association Awards	Best Cinematography in a Non-Series	Fargo	Nominated
2014	18th Online Film & TV Association Awards	Best Production Design in a Non-Series	Fargo	Won
2014	18th Online Film & TV Association Awards	Best Sound in a Non-Series	Fargo	Nominated
2014	18th Online Film & TV Association Awards	Best Visual Effects in a Non-Series	Fargo	Nominated
2014	18th Online Film & TV Association Awards	Best Actor in a Motion Picture or Miniseries	Martin Freeman	Nominated
2014	18th Online Film & TV Association Awards	Best Actor in a Motion Picture or Miniseries	Billy Bob Thornton	Nominated
2014	18th Online Film & TV Association Awards	Best Supporting Actor in a Motion Picture or Miniseries	Colin Hanks	Nominated
2014	18th Online Film & TV Association Awards	Best Supporting Actress in a Motion Picture or Miniseries	Allison Tolman	Nominated
2014	66th Primetime Emmy Awards			
2014	66th Primetime Emmy Awards	Outstanding Limited or Anthology Series	Fargo	Won
2014	66th Primetime Emmy Awards	Outstanding Lead Actor in a Miniseries or Movie	Martin Freeman	Nominated
2014	66th Primetime Emmy Awards	Outstanding Lead Actor in a Miniseries or Movie	Billy Bob Thornton	Nominated
2014	66th Primetime Emmy Awards	Outstanding Supporting Actor in a Miniseries or Movie	Colin Hanks	Nominated
2014	66th Primetime Emmy Awards	Outstanding Supporting Actress in a Miniseries or Movie	Allison Tolman	Nominated
2014	66th Primetime Emmy Awards	Outstanding Directing for a Miniseries or Movie	Adam Bernstein ("The Crocodile's Dilemma")	Nominated
2014	66th Primetime Emmy Awards	Outstanding Directing for a Miniseries or Movie	Colin Bucksey ("Buridan's Ass")	Won
2014	66th Primetime Emmy Awards	Outstanding Writing for a Miniseries or Movie	Noah Hawley ("The Crocodile's Dilemma")	Nominated
2014	66th Primetime Creative Arts Emmy Awards			
2014	66th Primetime Creative Arts Emmy Awards	Outstanding Casting for a Miniseries or Movie	Rachel Tenner, Jackie Lind, and Stephanie Gorin	Won
2014	66th Primetime Creative Arts Emmy Awards	Outstanding Cinematography for a Miniseries or Movie	Dana Gonzales ("Buridan's Ass")	Nominated
2014	66th Primetime Creative Arts Emmy Awards	Outstanding Cinematography for a Miniseries or Movie	Matt Lloyd ("The Crocodile's Dilemma")	Nominated
2014	66th Primetime Creative Arts Emmy Awards	Outstanding Single-Camera Picture Editing for Miniseries or Movie	Regis Kimble ("Buridan's Ass")	Nominated
2014	66th Primetime Creative Arts Emmy Awards	Outstanding Single-Camera Picture Editing for Miniseries or Movie	Skip MacDonald ("The Crocodile's Dilemma")	Nominated
2014	66th Primetime Creative Arts Emmy Awards	Outstanding Single-Camera Picture Editing for Miniseries or Movie	Bridget Durnford ("The Rooster Prince")	Nominated
2014	66th Primetime Creative Arts Emmy Awards	Outstanding Makeup (Non-Prosthetic)	Gail Kennedy, Joanne Preece, Gunther Schetterer, and Keith Sayer	Nominated
2014	66th Primetime Creative Arts Emmy Awards	Outstanding Music Composition in a Limited/Anthology Series or Movie	Jeff Russo ("The Crocodile's Dilemma")	Nominated
2014	66th Primetime Creative Arts Emmy Awards	Outstanding Sound Editing for a Limited/Anthology Series or Movie	Frank Laratta, Kevin Buchholz, John Peccatiello, Skye Lewin, Jason Lawrence, Brent Planiden, Adam DeCoster, and Andrew Morgado ("The Crocodile's Dilemma")	Nominated
2014	66th Primetime Creative Arts Emmy Awards	Outstanding Sound Mixing for a Limited/Anthology Series or Movie	Mike Playfair, David Raines, Mark Server, and Chris Philp ("The Crocodile's Dilemma")	Nominated
2014	30th TCA Awards			
2014	30th TCA Awards	Outstanding New Program	Fargo	Nominated
2014	30th TCA Awards	Outstanding Achievement in Movies, Miniseries, and Specials	Fargo	Nominated
2014	16th Women's Image Network Awards		Fargo	
2014	16th Women's Image Network Awards	Made-for-TV Movie/Mini-Series	Fargo	Nominated
2014	16th Women's Image Network Awards	Actress Made-for-TV Movie/Miniseries	Allison Tolman	Nominated
2015	65th ACE Eddie Awards			
2015	65th ACE Eddie Awards	Best Edited Mini-Series or Motion Picture for Television	Regis Kimble ("Buridan's Ass")	Nominated
2015	19th Art Directors Guild Awards			
2015	19th Art Directors Guild Awards	TV movie or Mini-Series	John Blackie and Warren Alan Young	Nominated
2015	30th Artios Awards			
2015	30th Artios Awards	TV Movie or Miniseries	Rachel Tenner, Jackie Lind (location casting), Stephanie Gorin (location casting), Charlene Lee (associate)	Won
2015	ASCAP Film and Television Music Awards 2015			
2015	ASCAP Film and Television Music Awards 2015	Top Television Series	Jeff Russo	Won
2015	Banff Rockie Awards 2015			
2015	Banff Rockie Awards 2015	Serial Drama	Fargo	Nominated
2015	Camerimage 2015			
2015	Camerimage 2015	Best Pilot	Matthew J. Lloyd (The Crocodile's Dilemma)	Nominated
2015	51st CAS Awards			
2015	51st CAS Awards	Outstanding Achievement in Sound Mixing – TV Movie or Mini-Series	Michael Playfair, CAS (production mixer), David Raines, CAS (re-recording mixer), Mark Server (re-recording mixer), Andrew Morgado (ADR mixer) (for "The Rooster Prince")	Nominated
2015	6th Dorian Awards			
2015	6th Dorian Awards	TV Drama of the Year	Fargo	Nominated
2015	72nd Golden Globe Awards		Fargo	
2015	72nd Golden Globe Awards	Best Miniseries or TV Film	Fargo	Won
2015	72nd Golden Globe Awards	Best Actor – Miniseries or TV Film	Martin Freeman	Nominated
2015	72nd Golden Globe Awards	Best Actor – Miniseries or TV Film	Billy Bob Thornton	Won
2015	72nd Golden Globe Awards	Best Actress – Miniseries or TV Film	Allison Tolman	Nominated
2015	72nd Golden Globe Awards	Best Supporting Actor – TV	Colin Hanks	Nominated
2015	International Film Music Critics Association Awards			
2015	International Film Music Critics Association Awards	Best Original Score for a Television Series	Jeff Russo	Nominated
2015	Make-Up Artists and Hair Stylists Guild Awards			
2015	Make-Up Artists and Hair Stylists Guild Awards	Miniseries or TV Movie Contemporary Make-Up	Gail Kennedy and Joanne Preece	Won
2015	Make-Up Artists and Hair Stylists Guild Awards	Miniseries or TV Movie Period and/or Character Make-up	Chris Glimsdale and Keith Sayer	Nominated
2015	Make-Up Artists and Hair Stylists Guild Awards	Miniseries or TV Movie Special Make-up Effects	Gail Kennedy, David Trainor and Gunther Schetterer	Nominated
2015	Make-Up Artists and Hair Stylists Guild Awards	Miniseries or TV Movie Contemporary Hair Styling	Gail Kennedy and Joanne Preece	Nominated
2015	62nd MPSE Golden Reel Awards			
2015	62nd MPSE Golden Reel Awards	TV Short Form Music Score	Skye Lewin, MPSE (supervising music editor) (for "The Crocodile's Dilemma")	Won
2015	62nd MPSE Golden Reel Awards	TV Short Form – Effects/Foley	Frank Laratta (supervising sound editor), Kevin Buchholz (supervising sound editor), John Peccatiello (sound designer), Andrew Morgado (supervising Foley editor) & Adam Decoster (Foley artist) (for "Buridan's Ass")	Nominated
2015	74th Peabody Awards			
2015	74th Peabody Awards	Peabody Award	Fargo	Won
2015	26th Producers Guild of America Awards			
2015	26th Producers Guild of America Awards	Outstanding Producer of Long-Form Television	Adam Bernstein, John Cameron, Ethan Coen, Joel Coen, Michael Frislev, Noah Hawley, Warren Littlefield, Chad Oakes and Kim Todd	Won
2015	Royal Television Society Programme Awards 2015			
2015	Royal Television Society Programme Awards 2015	Best International TV Series	Fargo	Won
2015	19th Satellite Awards		Fargo	
2015	19th Satellite Awards	Best TV Series – Drama	Fargo	Nominated
2015	19th Satellite Awards	Best Actor – TV Series Drama	Martin Freeman	Nominated
2015	19th Satellite Awards	Best Actor – TV Series Drama	Billy Bob Thornton	Nominated
2015	19th Satellite Awards	Best Supporting Actress – Series, Miniseries or TV Film	Allison Tolman	Nominated
2015	21st Screen Actors Guild Awards			
2015	21st Screen Actors Guild Awards	Outstanding Performance by a Male Actor in a Miniseries or Television Movie	Billy Bob Thornton	Nominated
2015	Screenwriters Choice Awards 2014			
2015	Screenwriters Choice Awards 2014	Best Television Drama	Noah Hawley	Nominated

== Home media release ==
On October 14, 2014, 20th Century Fox Home Entertainment released the first season of Fargo on DVD and Blu-ray. In addition to all ten episodes, both DVD and Blu-ray disc formats include audio commentaries on three episodes by Billy Bob Thornton, Allison Tolman and Noah Hawley, deleted scenes, three behind-the-scenes featurettes, and in select sets, an exclusive, collectible beanie.
