= List of koans by Yunmen Wenyan =

The following is a list of gong'ans attributed to the Zen master Yunmen Wenyan (also known as Unmon Bun'en in Japanese).

== Gong'ans ==
- Yunmen inquired of his monks, "This world is such a wide world! Why then do you answer to a temple bell and don ceremonial robes?"
- A monk asked Yunmen, "What is the Dharmakaya (the ultimate formless timeless reality)?".

Yunmen replied: "A garden of medicinal flowers."
The monk then said, "Is that all I need to understand?"
Yunmen replied: "If that isn't enough, then you'll need to see the mythical Golden-Haired Lion."

- A monk once asked Yunmen, "What is the Dharma Kaya?"

Yunmen answered: "The Six Ungraspables." (The Graspables are the five senses and the mind.)

- When Yunmen was asked "What is the pure Dharmakaya?", he replied: "The flowering hedge" (surrounding the privy).
- Yunmen Chanshi said: "Men of immeasurable greatness are tossed about in the ebb and flow of words."
- Of the Chan saying: "Buddha preached for forty-nine years, but his tongue never moved," the master Xuansha said:

"Pious teachers say that Buddhism helps us in every possible way, but think: how can it help the blind, the deaf, or the dumb? The blind cannot see the teacher's staff that is raised before them. The deaf cannot hear the teacher's words, no matter how wise. The dumb cannot ask their questions or speak their understanding. So since we cannot help these people, how can we say Buddhism helps in every possible way? What good is it?"

Many years later a monk asked the master Yunmen to explain these words of Xuansha. After making the questioner prostrate himself and then rise, Yunmen swiped at him with his staff. The monk jumped back.

"Ah-ha!" said Yunmen, "I see you are not blind!" Then he told the monk to come forward, which he did.

"Ah-ha!" said Yunmen, "I see you are not deaf!" Then he asked the monk if he understood what all this to-do was about. The monk said he did not. "Ah-ha!" said Yunmen, "I see you are not dumb!"

- A Zen student told Yunmen- "Brilliancy of Buddha illuminates the whole universe."

Before he finished the phrase, Yunmen asked: "You are reciting another's poem, are you not?"
"Yes", answered the student.
"You are sidetracked," said Yunmen.
Afterwards another teacher, Sixin (死心悟新), asked his pupils: "At which point did that student go off the track?"

- Dongshan (Yunmen's future successor as head of the Yunmen school) went to Yunmen. Yunmen asked him where he came from. Dongshan said, "From Chadu Village."

Yunmen asked: "In what temple did you remain for the summer?"
Dongshan replied, "Baoci Temple, in Henan."
"When did you leave there?" asked Yunmen, wondering how long Dongshan would continue with such factual answers.
"The twenty-fifth of August", answered Dongshan.
Yunmen then said: "I should give you three blows, but today I forgive you."
The next day Dongshan bowed to Yunmen and asked, "Yesterday you forgave me three blows. I do not know why you thought me wrong." Yunmen, rebuking Dongshan's spiritless responses, said: "You are good for nothing! You simply wander from one monastery to another." Before Yunmen's words were ended, Dongshan was enlightened.

- Once Xuefeng (雪峰义存) came before the assembly and said, "In a southern mountain, there is a turtle-nosed serpent. You monks must have a good look at this creature. "Changqing (長慶慧稜), Yunmen, and Xuansha were in the assembly. Changqing stepped forward and said: "In this hall someone will lose his body and life today." Yunmen threw his staff down in front of Xuefeng and made a gesture as of fear at discovering the serpent. Xuansha said, "Brother Changqing's answer has some substance to it. However, I should not say it thus, but ask why we refer to the southern mountain."
- Yunmen asked the head monk, "What sutra are you lecturing on?"

"The Nirvana Sutra."
"The Nirvana Sutra has the Four Virtues, hasn't it?"
"It has."
Yunmen asked, picking up a cup, "How many virtues has this?"
"None at all, " said the monk.
"But ancient people said it had, didn't they?" said Yunmen. "What do you think of what they said?" Yunmen struck the cup and asked, "You understand?"
"No," said the monk.
"Then," said Yunmen, "You'd better go on with your lectures on the sutra."

- A monk asked Yunmen, "What is the teaching that transcends the Buddha and patriarchs?"

Yunmen said, "A sesame bun."

- Cuiyan (翠巖), at the end of the annual summer meditation retreat, said to his monks, "The whole summer have I lectured you. Look! Has Cuiyan any eyebrows?" Baofu (保福從展) said: "A robber knows in his heart he is a thief." Changqing said, "Far from dropping off from too much talking, they have grown longer!" But then Yunmen forcefully shouted "Guan!" (關; lit "Close")
- Monk: "What is the one road of Yunmen?"

Yunmen: "Personal Experience!"
Monk: "What is the Way?"
Yunmen: "Go!"
Monk: "What is the road, where is the Way?"
Yunmen: "Begin walking it!"

- A monk asked Yunmen, "What will happen when the leaves fall and the trees become bare?" Yunmen said, "Golden Wind!" (or, "The trunk is visible in the autumn wind.")
- Yunmen once lived within a temple called the "Chapel of Holy Fruits". One morning, a government official visited him, and asked him, "Are your fruits well-ripened now?" "None of them has ever been called green", replied Yunmen.
- A travelling monk asked Yunmen, "What is the teaching given by Gautama Buddha during his lifetime?" Yunmen replied: "The teaching confronts each."
- A monk asked Yunmen. "What would the Shakyamuni Buddha have said if there were no one to hear and no occasion to teach?" Yunmen answered: "The opposite of statement."
- One day Yunmen stood up and said to his disciples: "If you do not see a man for three days, do not think he is the same man. How about you?" No one spoke, so he said: "One thousand!"
- A monk asked Yunmen, "What is the kind of talk that transcends Buddhas and Patriarchs?" Yunmen replied: "Rice cake!"
- A monk asked Yunmen, "What is your family tradition?" Yunmen replied thus: "Oh, it looks like students who wish to come to learn are already outside the gate."
- A monk asked Yunmen, "What is Yunmen's melody?" Yunmen replied: "The twenty-fifth of December!"
- A monk asked Yunmen, "What is the samadhi of each individual thing?" Yunmen replied: "Rice in bowl, water in pail!"
- A monk asked Yunmen, "No thoughts have risen. Are there any faults or not?" Yunmen said: "Mount Sumeru!"
- Said Yunmen to his disciples, "I do not ask you to say anything about before the fifteenth day of the month, but say something about after the fifteenth day of the month." Because no monk could reply, Yunmen answered himself and said, "Every day is a good day!"
- Said Yunmen to his disciples, "However wonderful a thing is, it may be that it is better not to have it at all."
- A monk asked Qianfeng (Note: Yuezhou Qianfeng, a disciple and dharma heir of Dongshan.) (曹山本寂) has no such leisure." (越州乾峰), "The one road of Nirvana leads into the ten quarters. But where does it begin?" Qianfeng raised his staff and traced a horizontal line in the air. "Here." Disappointed, the monk went to Yunmen and asked him the same question. Yunmen held up his fan, and said: "This fan leaps up to Trāyastriṃśa and hits the presiding deity on the nose, then it dives down into the Eastern Sea where it hits the holy carp. The carp becomes a dragon which then brings a flood of rain."
- One day, while lecturing his monks, Yunmen asked them, "Do you want to meet the old Patriarchs?" Before any of the monks could answer, he pointed his stick above their heads and said, "The Patriarchs are jumping on your head!" Then he asked, "Do you wish to look them in the eye?" He pointed to the ground and said: "They are all under our feet!" After a moment, he spoke to himself, saying: "I made a great feast in the joss house, but the hungry gods are never satisfied."
- A monk once asked Yunmen, "What is this place where knowledge is useless?" Yunmen answered him: "Knowledge and emotion cannot fathom it!"
- Yunmen asked: "If a person who is difficult to change should come to you, would you receive him?"

The master answered: "Caoshan (Note: Caoshan Benji, Dongshan's foremost disciple.) (曹山本寂) has no such leisure."

Monk: "Where is the place from which all buddhas come?"
Yunmen: "Next question, please!"

== In popular culture ==
The TV series Fargo makes liberal use of gong'ans. For example, in episode 5, titled "The Six Ungraspables" (May 2014), Gus' rabbi-like neighbor relates a parable, and in episode 6, "Buridan's Ass", Malvo has Don (voice disguised) phone Stavros and read a gong'an over the telephone.
