= The Confirmation =

2016 film by Bob Nelson

- Film poster
- Directed by: Bob Nelson
- Screenplay by: Bob Nelson
- Produced by: Bob Nelson; Todd Hoffman
- Starring: Clive Owen; Jaeden Martell; Maria Bello; Robert Forster; Tim Blake Nelson; Patton Oswalt; Matthew Modine; Spencer Drever
- Cinematography: Terry Stacey
- Edited by: Steven Rasch
- Music by: Jeff Cardoni
- Production companies: Great Point Media; Bungalow Media + Entertainment; Lighthouse Pictures; Sapphire Fire Limited
- Distributed by: Saban Films; Lionsgate Films
- Release date: March 18, 2016 (United States)
- Running time: 90 minutes
- Country: Canada
- Language: English
- Budget: $2 million
- Box office: $8,382

The Confirmation is a 2016 Canadian drama film starring Clive Owen, Jaeden Martell, and Maria Bello. Written and directed by Bob Nelson, who also produced it with Todd Hoffman, the film concerns a young boy (Martell), who tries to reconnect with his divorced father (Owen). The film also co-stars Robert Forster, Tim Blake Nelson, Patton Oswalt, and Matthew Modine. It marked the first time Nelson had ever directed a film. The Confirmation received a limited release in selected theaters in the United States and on iTunes on March 18, 2016.

== Plot ==
Walt, a divorced father and his eight-year-old son, Anthony, are about to spend a somewhat predictable weekend together, nevertheless, when a valuable toolbox gets stolen, the search for the thieves will soon turn into a true family bonding.

== Cast ==
- Clive Owen as Walt
- Jaeden Martell as Anthony
- Maria Bello as Bonnie
- Robert Forster as Otto
- Tim Blake Nelson as Vaughn
- Patton Oswalt as Drake
- Matthew Modine as Kyle
- Stephen Tobolowsky as Father Lyons
- Spencer Drever as Allen
- Michael Eklund as Tucker
- Ryan Robbins as Trout
- Garry Chalk as Pete
- Jennifer Copping as Roger's Wife
- Patrick Gilmore as Roger
- Catherine Lough Haggquist as Officer Sue
- Luvia Petersen as Bartender Nancy
- Eliza Faria as Linda

== Production ==
Screenwriter Bob Nelson, who had previously worked on penning the screenplay for Nebraska (2013) directed by Alexander Payne, first mentioned the project in an interview with Wall Street Journal in February 2014, where he stated that he had completed the screenplay for the film. Principal photography commenced on November 11, 2014 in Vancouver, British Columbia.

On November 18, 2014, it was announced that Clive Owen, Jaeden Lieberher and Maria Bello were cast in the film, along with Robert Forster, Tim Blake Nelson, Patton Oswalt and Matthew Modine. In September 2015, studio company Saban Films revealed that they had secured the distribution rights for a North American release.

== Screenplay ==
Nelson says "I thought it would be funny if you took a boy who was really good and doesn't really sin and have him break pretty much every commandment in a day. That kind of gave me a basis to start, too, when I was filling out the notebook."

The scene where Anthony keeps his father from getting alcohol is based on Bob Nelson's own experience.

The story outline is based on the Italian classic Bicycle Thieves by Vittorio de Sica.

== Release ==
The Confirmation premiered on March 18, 2016 as a limited release in selected theaters in the United States and on iTunes.

== Reception ==
On review aggregator Rotten Tomatoes, the film has an approval rating of 91% based on 32 reviews, with an average rating of 6.7/10. On Metacritic, the film holds a score of 65 out of 100, based on 11 critics, indicating "generally favorable reviews".
