= Spencer Drever =

Canadian teen actor

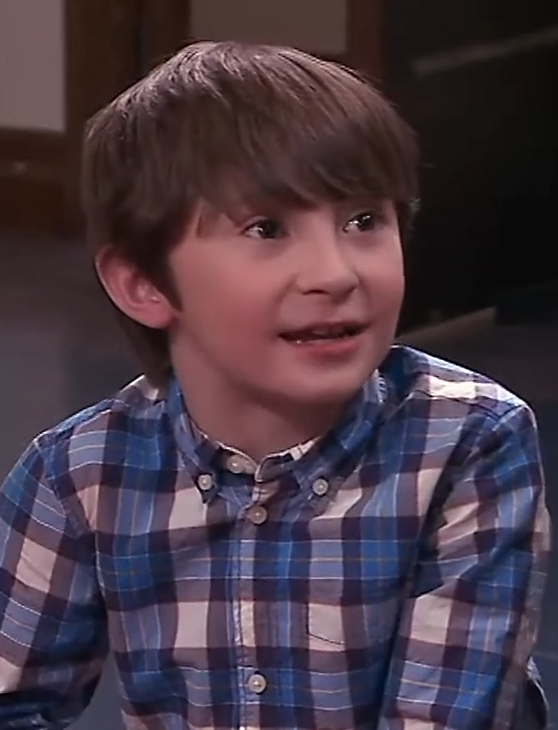
Drever in Mr. Young

Spencer Drever (born 2003) is a Canadian actor. For his role as Gordo Nygaard, Lester Nygaard's nephew in Fargo, he was awarded a Joey Award. He was a recurring cast member on CBC's Strange Empire and also appeared in Olympus on SyFy. Drever lived in Cloverdale, BC while Fargo was in production

== Filmography ==
Year	Title	Role	Notes
2011	Diary of a Wimpy Kid: Rodrick Rules	Harry Gilbertson	Supporting
2013	Eve of Destruction	Henry	Supporting role
2013	Mr. Young	Young Adam	Guest Star
2013	Stalkers	Henry	Supporting
2014	Happy Face Killer	Young Keith	Supporting
2014	Signed, Sealed, Delivered	Owen/Casey	Episode: Time To Start Livin'
2014	The 100	Young Bellamy	Episode: His Sister's Keeper
2014	Fargo	Gordo Nygaard	Recurring
2014	Strange Empire	Georgie	Recurring
2014	R. L. Stine's The Haunting Hour: The Series	Myron	Episode: Argh V
2015	The Whispers	Michael	Recurring
2015	Olympus	Alcimenes	Recurring
2016	The Confirmation	Allen	Supporting
2016	Ready Jet Go!	Mitchell Peterson	Supporting
2016	Devil's Gate	Jonah	
2017	When Calls the Heart	Cyrus Rivera	Recurring
2017	Supernatural	Young Mick Davies	Episode: "The British Invasion"
2019	A Dog's Way Home	Rick	
2019	Unspeakable	Teen Ryan Sanders	
