= Colin Bucksey =

American director

- Born: Camberwell, London, England
- Occupations: Film and television director
- Years active: 1973–present
- Spouses: Verity Lambert (m. 1973; div. 1987); Sally Bucksey (m. 1988)
- Children: 2

Colin Bucksey is a British-American film and television director.

== Career ==
Since the 1970s, Bucksey has accumulated a number of credits in British TV, directing episodes of Crown Court, Armchair Thriller, Educating Marmalade and Bergerac.

He moved into American TV, directing episodes of Miami Vice, Crime Story, Midnight Caller, Wiseguy, Sliders, Nash Bridges, Lexx, NCIS: Naval Criminal Investigative Service, Numb3rs, Breaking Bad, The 4400, Burn Notice, Better Call Saul, Briarpatch and others. More recently, he directed the Fargo episodes "The Six Ungraspables" and "Buridan's Ass," the latter episode earning him a Primetime Emmy Award for Outstanding Directing for a Miniseries, Movie, or a Dramatic Special.

Bucksey also directed the TV film Blue Money (1985), starring Tim Curry, and Dealers (1989), starring Paul McGann and Rebecca De Mornay.

== Filmography ==
TV series

Year	Title	Notes
1976	Couples	2 episodes
1976	Crown Court	3 episodes
1977	Second City Firsts	Episode "Postcards from Southsea"
1977	Premiere	Episode "A Hymn from Jim"
1978	Hazell	Episode "Hazell and the Maltese Vulture"
1978	Sense of Place	Episode "From the Roots Came the Rapper"
1978	Z-Cars	Episode "Departures"
1978	BBC2 Play of the Week	Episode "Fearless Frank"
1978–1983	Play for Today	2 episodes
1979	The Dick Francis Thriller: The Racing Game	Episode "Horsenap"
1980	Armchair Thriller	5 episodes
1981	Wolcott	1 episode
1981	Theatre Box	Episode "Marmalade Atkins in Space"
1982	ITV Playhouse	Episode "Nightlife"
1982–1983	Educating Marmalade	3 episodes
1983	Bergerac	Episode "A Miracle Every Week"
1986	Screen Two	4 episodes
1986	Call Me Mister	Episode "Long Shot"
1987	Deadly Nightmares	2 episodes
1987–1989	Miami Vice	4 episodes
1988	Crime Story	3 episodes
1989	Dealers	
1989	Midnight Caller	3 episodes
1990	DEA	Unknown episodes
1990	Wiseguy	2 episodes
1991	Death Merchant	
1993	The Untouchables	2 episodes
1994	Space Precinct	Episode "Double Duty"
1995	Live Shot	2 episodes
1996	Sliders	Episode "Obsession"
1996–1999	Nash Bridges	2 episodes
1997	Feds	Episode "Do No Harm"
1998	Space Island One	4 episodes
1998	Supply & Demand	3 episodes
1998	The New Adventures of Robin Hood	3 episodes
1999	CI5: The New Professionals	2 episodes
2000	Harbour Lights	Episode "No More Heroes"
2000	Urban Gothic	Episode "Vampirology"
2000	Falling Through	
2001	Lexx	5 episodes
2001–2003	In Deep	10 episodes
2001–2003	Holby City	4 episodes
2004	Starhunter	7 episodes
2005	Kojak	2 episodes
2005–2008	NCIS	7 episodes
2006	Night Stalker	Episode "What's the Frequency, Kolchak?"
2006	Eureka	Episode "Primal"
2006–2007	The 4400	3 episodes
2007	Numbers	Episode "Finders Keepers"
2007–2011	Burn Notice	3 episodes
2009	Crash	Episode "Endangered Species"
2009–2012	Breaking Bad	Episodes: "Phoenix," "I See You," "Bullet Points," and "Buyout"
2010	Trauma	Episode "Sweet Jane"
2010	The Glades	Episode "Honey"
2010	Medium	Episode "Talk to the Hand"
2011	The Secret Circle	Episode "Loner"
2011	Person of Interest	Episode "Judgment"
2012	House	Episode "Man of the House"
2012	Damages	Episode "Have You Met the Eel Yet?"
2012	Elementary	Episode "Lesser Evils"
2012–2014	Franklin & Bash	3 episodes
2012–2015	Revenge	5 episodes
2013	Monday Mornings	Episode "Communion"
2013	Do No Harm	Episode "Circadian Rhythms"
2013	Lucky 7	Episode "Gold Star, Inc."
2014	Killer Women	2 episodes
2014	Fargo	Episodes: "The Six Ungraspables" and "Buridan's Ass"
2014	The Bridge	2 episodes
2014	Resurrection	Episode "Miracles"
2015	Battle Creek	Episode "The Hand-Off"
2015	Ray Donovan	4 episodes (Also supervising producer on 12 episodes)
2015–2016	Better Call Saul	Episodes: "Hero," "RICO," and "Inflatable"
2016	Criminal Minds: Beyond Borders	Episode "The Harmful One"
2016	The Family	2 episodes
2016	Masters of Sex	3 episodes (Also co-executive producer on 10 episodes)
2016	The Man in the High Castle	Episode "The Road Less Traveled"
2017	Get Shorty	Episode "Sins of a Chambermaid"
2017	Ten Days in the Valley	Episode "Day 2: Cutting Room Floor"
2017–2019	Billions	7 episodes
2018	Six	Episode "Critical"
2018–2019	The Affair	5 episodes
2019	Wu-Tang: An American Saga	Episode "Assassination Day"
2020	The Sinner	Episode "Part V"
2020	Briarpatch	2 episodes
2020	The Great	3 episodes
2022	The Offer	2 episodes
2022	Panhandle	Pilot episode "To Bell or Not to Bell?" (Also executive producer)
2025	Mayfair Witches	Episode: "Lasher"

TV movies

- Video Stars (1983)
- Bouncing Back (1983)
- Blue Money (1985)
- Curiosity Kills (1990)
- Notorious (1992)
- Midnight's Child (1992)
- Anna Lee: Headcase (1993)
- Terror in the Night (1994)
- A Kidnapping in the Family (1996)
- September (1996)
- When Secrets Kill (1997)
- Nightmare Street (1998)
