= Gus Grimly =

Fargo character

- Fargo character
- First appearance: "The Crocodile's Dilemma" (2014)
- Last appearance: "Palindrome" (2015)
- Created by: Noah Hawley
- Portrayed by: Colin Hanks

In-universe information
- Occupation: Police officer; Deputy; Minnesota State Patrol; Mailman
- Spouse: Molly Solverson
- Children: Greta Grimly; Unnamed son
- Relatives: Lou Solverson (father-in-law); Betsy Solverson (mother-in-law); Hank Larsson (grandfather-in-law)

Gus Grimly is a fictional character in the FX television series Fargo. One of the main characters of the first season, he is portrayed by Colin Hanks. He appears as a guest in season 2, with Hanks briefly reprising his role in a cameo.

== Character summary ==
Grimly is a protagonist of the first season and appears as a guest in the second season. In the first season, he is introduced as an officer, and is a supporting figure in the solving of the case involving Lorne Malvo (Billy Bob Thornton) and Lester Nygaard (Martin Freeman). By the end of the season, he is working as a mailman following the inquiry into shooting Molly during the white out gun fight between Lorne Malvo and Mr Numbers and Mr Wrench. It is not stated whether he was fired or resigned from the Duluth PD.

=== Character arc ===
After Chief Vern Thurman (Shawn Doyle) and Lester Nygaard's (Martin Freeman) wife is murdered, Gus Grimly pulls Lorne Malvo (Billy Bob Thornton) over for speeding. Malvo presents Grimly with two choices: press the issue (and face death), or allow Malvo to leave (and live). Malvo drives away as Grimly, confused, does not report the incident.

Much later, after his daughter told him she would always opt for the right thing no matter what, Gus finally tells his angry superior that he let Malvo off with a warning for speeding, and he is sent to Bemidji to inform their police department. He meets Molly for the first time and after seeing him with Greta, she invites them over to her father's restaurant where they share a friendly conversation.

Molly Solverson is visiting Gus Grimly in Duluth to discuss the recent murders when gunshots are reported. At the scene they find a car wreck that Numbers and Wrench staged to trap Malvo. Numbers and Wrench then attack with automatic weapons; Malvo escapes the ambush. Molly and Grimly get separated, and in the whiteout, Gus mistakes Molly for one of the perps and accidentally shoots her. At the hospital, Grimly agonizes over hurting Molly and destroying her spleen, but the injury is not fatal.

A year passes, and Gus Grimly, now a mailman, is happily married to Molly Solverson as they eagerly await their first child's birth. At the precinct, Molly receives a call from Las Vegas P.D. asking her to interview Lester Nygaard as a witness for a triple homicide Malvo committed earlier. After having questioned him and his second wife at their home, she is informed by the precinct that two FBI agents from Fargo field office want to meet her about the massacre committed there a year ago. She agrees to meet them at her father's cafe where she enters through the back door just as Malvo has left through the front door. She presents and impresses the agents with her investigation results.

At home, Molly Solverson receives word that another of Lester's wives has been murdered. Molly goes to the crime scene where she meets Lester. Lester tries but fails to retrieve the tickets from the jacket. The police bring Lester back to the station, where he refuses to answer any questions. Lester is allowed to return home the next morning, but must be accompanied by FBI agents Pepper and Budge.

Malvo enters Lester's house, and each stalks but fails to kill the other. Malvo strikes Lester in the face with Lester's award, bloodying his face and mirroring the injury inflicted on Lester by Sam Hess a year earlier. Though Lester's gun jams, Malvo's foot is caught in a bear trap left by Lester, and he escapes severely injured. Malvo retreats to his cabin to treat his injury, not knowing that Grimly has already found it. Grimly tells Malvo that he has solved his riddle posed a year earlier, and kills Malvo. When the police arrive, they find Malvo's trove of audio tapes, including the one containing Lester's confession for the murder of his first wife. Two weeks later, Lester, now the subject of a manhunt after his murder of Pearl has been revealed, is shown on a snowmobile in Glacier National Park. Lester is recognized by law enforcement officers and tries to escape, only to crash his snowmobile. Desperate, he continues on foot, only to crash through thin ice, presumably meeting his end, and revealing that the scene shown at the beginning of the episode depicted Lester's fate.

At home, Molly receives the news of Lester. Gus tells her that he's receiving a citation for bravery, but he feels that she deserves it. Molly reassures her husband that this is his moment.
