= Ellipsis (narrative device) =

Narrative device

Ellipsis is the narrative device of omitting a portion of the sequence of events, allowing the reader to fill in the narrative gaps. Aside from its literary use, the ellipsis has a counterpart in film production. It is there to suggest an action by simply showing what happens before and after what is observed. The vast majority of films use ellipses to clear actions that add nothing to the narrative. Beyond these "convenience" ellipses, ellipses are also used to advance the story.

== Description ==
An ellipsis in narrative leaves out a portion of the story. This can be used to condense time, or as a stylistic method to allow the reader to fill in the missing portions of the narrative with their imagination. Ellipsis was also used in literature, as in the modernist works of Ernest Hemingway who pioneered the iceberg theory, also known as the theory of omission.

Virginia Woolf's novel To the Lighthouse contains famous examples of literary ellipses. Between the first and second parts of the novel, many years pass and World War I is fought and won. The reader is left to infer the events that have taken place during the elapsed time by the changes evident in the characters in the novel. Another example is found in Edith Wharton's The Age of Innocence.

Ellipsis is a common procedure in film narrative, where movement and action unnecessary to the telling of a story will often be removed by editing. For example, there would be no need to show a character standing up from a chair and walking the length of a room to open a door. Instead, the character may be shown standing up from the chair and then in the next cut—normally viewed from a different angle, or with a cutaway shot in between, necessary to smooth over the gap—he would have already crossed the room and be over by the door. Narrative logic allows the viewer to disregard the ellipsis in this case. At the start of Stanley Kubrick's 2001: A Space Odyssey (1968), for example, a giant chronological leap is taken as the narrative jumps from the first technology of humankind, a bone club, to a spacecraft flying through space in the year 2001. In this instance, however, the ellipsis—a match cut in film language—is filled by the metaphorical parallelism between the two objects, visually similar in shape and joined by a deep anthropological significance.

The Message is a film depicting the initial years of Islam. To respect the beliefs of some Muslims about depictions of Muhammad, the prophet and members of his family are not shown. His presence is conveyed through characters repeating his words or, when action requires his intervention, it is filmed from his point of view.

The Japanese director Yasujirō Ozu is also famous for his use of ellipsis. Important people or events would be omitted in his narration, leaving what has happened evident to audiences only through subsequent dialogue. For example, in Late Spring (1949), Noriko is shown about to leave for her wedding in her kimono, while the next scene shows Mr. Somiya in a bar after the wedding.
