= Joshua Close =

Canadian film and television actor

- Born: August 31, 1981 (age 45); Oakville, Ontario, Canada
- Other name: Josh Close
- Occupation: Actor
- Years active: 2002–present
- Spouse: Alex McKenna (m. 2016)

Joshua Close (born August 31, 1981) is a Canadian film and television actor.

== Early life ==
Close was born in Oakville, Ontario and has a brother and two stepsisters. Close attended Iroquois Ridge High School and after graduating went on to Circle in the Square Theatre School, New York City.

== Filmography ==
| Year | Title | Role | Notes |
|---|---|---|---|
| 2002 | Undressed | Kurt | Season 6, unknown episodes |
| 2002 | K-19: The Widowmaker | Viktor | |
| 2002 | Evelyn: The Cutest Evil Dead Girl | Devin | Short film |
| 2002 | Adam and Eve | Micheal | |
| 2003 | Twist | Oliver | |
| 2003 | Sex and the Single Mom | Tyler | |
| 2003 | Tarzan | Kurt | Episode "Secrets and Lies" |
| 2003–2004 | Blue Murder | Various roles | 2 episodes |
| 2004 | A Home at the End of the World | Reiner | Uncredited |
| 2004 | Life as We Know It | Matt Gleason | 3 episodes |
| 2005 | The Exorcism of Emily Rose | Jason | |
| 2005 | The Stranger I Married | Joe | Original title: "The Man Who Lost Himself" |
| 2006 | The Plague | Kip | |
| 2007 | The Third Eye | Jacob Printz | |
| 2007 | Full of It | Kyle Plunkett | |
| 2007 | Diary of the Dead | Jason Creed | |
| 2008 | The Day the Earth Stood Still | Flash Chamber Engineer | |
| 2009 | The Unusuals | Detective Henry Cole | 10 episodes |
| 2009 | Short on Love | —N/a | Director and writer |
| 2010 | The Dead Sleep | Tim | |
| 2010 | The Pacific | Edward Sledge | 2 episodes |
| 2010 | The Glades | Terry Evans | Episode "Breaking 80" |
| 2010 | Thorne: Sleepyhead | Josh Ramsey | 6 episodes |
| 2010 | Law & Order: LA | Kevin Miller | Episode "Sylmar" |
| 2011 | The Craigslist Killer | Detective Frye | |
| 2011 | Republic of Doyle | Tyler | Episode "A Stand Up Guy" |
| 2011 | Isolation | Jake | |
| 2012 | In Their Skin | Mark Hughes | Also writer |
| 2012 | The Master | Wayne Gregory | |
| 2013 | Justified | Joe Hoppus | 2 episodes |
| 2013 | The Privileged | Richard Hunter | |
| 2013 | Waterloo | Montgomery Kessler | Short film |
| 2014 | Rake | Jedidiah Miller | Episode "A Close Shave" |
| 2014 | Fargo | Chazz Nygaard | 6 episodes |
| 2014 | Kill the Messenger | Rich Kline | |
| 2014 | Legends | Aaron Rawley | 2 episodes |
| 2015 | 12 Monkeys | Ivan | Episode "The Night Room" |
| 2015 | The Blacklist | Dr. Julian Powell | Episode "The Longevity Initiative" |
| 2015 | Solace | Linus Harp | |
| 2015 | Brooklyn Animal Control | William Salo | 1 episode |
| 2016 | Person of Interest | Jeff Blackwell | 5 episodes |
| 2016 | We | Reese | Short film |
| 2016 | Julianne | Unknown role | Short film |
| 2016 | 1,2,3... You Please. | Young Man | Short film; also director, writer, and producer |
| 2017 | Go North | Martin | |
| 2017 | Sensum | Matthew Mitchell | Short film |
| 2017 | Animal Kingdom | Nate | Episode "Custody" |
| 2018 | Anthem of a Teenage Prophet | Mr. Thorp | Also writer |
| 2018 | The Truth About the Harry Quebert Affair | Luther Caleb | 10 episodes |
| 2019 | Capsized: Blood in the Water | Mark Adams | |
| 2019 | III | William Sparks | |
| 2020 | Within These Walls | Ben Shields | |
| 2022 | Monica | Paul | |
| 2023 | Plan B | Andy | |
| 2023 | Killers of the Flower Moon | Horace Burkhart | |
| 2025 | Little Lorraine | | |
| 2025 | A Breed Apart | Sydney Tompkins | |
| 2025 | Wayward | Duck | |
| 2026 | Below | Officer Noseworthy | |

== Awards and nominations ==
| Year | Award | Category | Work | Result | Ref. |
|---|---|---|---|---|---|
| 2011 | 26th Gemini Awards | Best Performance by an Actor in a Featured Supporting Role in a Dramatic Program or Mini-Series | Thorne: Sleepyhead | Won | |
