= Lou Solverson =

Fargo character

- Fargo character
- Patrick Wilson as Lou Solverson in season 2 of Fargo
- First appearance: "The Crocodile's Dilemma" (2014)
- Last appearance: "Palindrome" (2015)
- Created by: Noah Hawley
- Portrayed by: Keith Carradine (Season 1): Patrick Wilson (Season 2)

In-universe information
- Occupation: Season 1: Owner of Lou's Coffee Shop; Season 2: Minnesota State Patrol
- Family: Hank Larsson (father-in-law); Season 1: Gus Grimly (son-in-law); Greta Grimly (step-granddaughter); Unnamed grandson
- Spouse: Betsy Solverson (deceased)
- Children: Molly Solverson (daughter)

Lou Solverson is a fictional character in the FX television series Fargo. He first appeared as a supporting character in the first season (set in 2006–2007), played by Keith Carradine, and then as a main character in the second season (set in 1979), played by Patrick Wilson.

== Character summary ==
=== Season 1 ===
Solverson has a minor role in season one. In 2006, he is a retired police officer, and is the owner of Lou's Coffee Shop. A widower, he appears as a wise mentor to his daughter, Molly Solverson who is investigating the crimes of Lorne Malvo and Lester Nygaard. He makes several references to his career, in particular the events of 1979, most notably when he describes the Sioux Falls Massacre to Lorne Malvo.

Keith Carradine as Lou Solverson in season 1

=== Season 2 ===
In 1979, Lou Solverson is a state trooper with the Minnesota State Police and based out of Luverne, Minnesota. He often works alongside his father-in-law, Rock County Sheriff Hank Larsson. One night, the two are assigned to investigate a triple murder at the Waffle Hut on the outskirts of Luverne. He notes the strangeness of the shooter (Rye Gerhardt—youngest son of the Gerhardt crime family) apparently fleeing the scene in a different vehicle after parking his own car outside the diner, with another car belonging to a Judge based out of Fargo, North Dakota. Unbeknownst to Lou and Hank, Rye was hit by beautician Peggy Blumquist's car after he had run into the road after seeing a UFO. Peggy, not knowing what to do, returns home with Rye stuck through her windshield, where he is later killed by her husband, local butcher Ed Blumquist, in self-defense. At home, Lou is dealing with the worsening cancer of his wife Betsy while also raising their 6-year-old daughter, Molly.

Later, while driving his family into town, Lou stops by the crime scene where Betsy finds Rye's gun in some weeds. While at the scene, he notices Kansas City mob associates Mike Milligan and brothers Gale and Wayne Kitchen observing him intently, and calls ahead so Hank can detain them and intimidate them into leaving the state. Later that night, Lou sees a light on inside the closed butcher shop and finds Ed working late, as he is disposing of Rye's body in a meat grinder. Lou asks to buy some bacon for Molly, while Ed does his best to distract Lou from noticing a severed finger that had rolled under a door. Lou eventually leaves unaware of what was really happening, and Ed finishes grinding Rye's body as strange flashing lights illuminate the exterior of the butcher shop.

The fingerprints on the gun are later found out to be Rye's, which leads to a wider manhunt for him. After identifying his suspect, Lou travels to Fargo and meets Detective Ben Schmidt to collaborate on the investigation. They encounter a local typewriter salesman named Skip Sprang, who had enlisted Rye to talk Judge Mundt into un-freezing an account, acting suspiciously outside of her office. They ask him some questions but decide to let him go. They then visit the Gerhardt farm and have a tense encounter with the family (Floyd, the matriarch in charge after her husband Otto suffered a stroke—Bear, the quieter, level-headed middle child—and Dodd, the hot-tempered elder son vying for control of the family), who also know Schmidt along with his mother. Lou then visits Skip's typewriter store on his own, only to encounter Milligan and the Kitchen brothers searching the place. After a tense Mexican standoff, Lou quickly leaves the shop.

When he returns home, he learns that Betsy's cancer is spreading, but learns that Betsy can take part in an experimental drug trial for a drug called Xanadu, but there is a 50/50 chance that Betsy would receive a placebo. Lou hesitates for Betsy to participate in the trial, but Betsy accepts anyway. After escorting presidential nominee Ronald Reagan's campaign bus to the state line, Lou links the Blumquists to Rye's death after Ed and Peggy stage a wreck to cover up the damage and take the car to local mechanic Sonny Greer, and Sonny catches Gerhardt enforcer Hanzee Dent inspecting the car. Growing suspicious of the Blumquists' role in Rye's death, he visits their house to question them. They refuse to talk to him and ask him to leave. Peggy takes Lou's warning about the Gerhardts' reputation for violence very seriously and plans to leave town, but Ed insists on staying. The next night, the Gerhardts send hitman Virgil Bauer, accompanied by Bear Gerhardt's son Charlie, to kill Ed in the shop. After Charlie hesitates to finish the job, Ed kills Virgil in self-defense, Charlie is wounded and arrested, and the shop burns to the ground.

While Lou is interrogating Ed at the police station, Bear leads a lynch mob that lays siege to the station in an attempt to take Charlie back. To avoid anyone from getting hurt, Lou sends out Ed's new lawyer, family friend Karl Weathers, to tell Bear and his men that he is also acting as Charlie's lawyer and that he will be given a reduced sentence due to him being a minor and not actually hurting anyone. After Bear accepts that it would be worse for Charlie to be a wanted fugitive for the rest of his life, he and his men leave. Meanwhile, Lou spirits Ed out the rear entrance of the police station, but Ed eventually escapes with Hanzee in close pursuit as Lou is picked up by Hank. While Ed and Lou are escaping, Dodd and two of his men enter the Blumquist home hunting for Peggy after Hank (who stayed behind with Peggy) was knocked out by Hanzee earlier. She hides in the basement and manages to bludgeon one man to death. After Dodd accidentally kills the other man, she sneaks up and electrocutes him with his own cattle prod before tying him up. Ed arrives and they flee in Dodd's car after placing him in the trunk.

The next day, Lou and Schmidt arrive at the Gerhardt family farm after a funeral for Rye and Otto (who was killed in an ambush on the farm by Milligan while Dodd and Bear were in Luverne), and take Floyd in for questioning at the Fargo police headquarters. She accepts a deal that will give her family amnesty for previous crimes they have committed in exchange for information about how the Kansas City syndicate runs their drug operation.

Ed, Peggy and a captive Dodd arrive at a cabin in the woods outside Sioux Falls that once belonged to Ed's uncle in order to figure out their next move. After repeated attempts to call and make a deal with the Gerhardts for the safe return of Dodd in exchange for their own safety fall flat, Ed calls Milligan offering Dodd in exchange for protection from the Gerhardts, to which Milligan agrees. Ed informs him to meet at the Motor Motel the next day. Hanzee eventually tracks them down, but kills Dodd instead after a lifetime of being treated like his dog. Hanzee asks Peggy for a haircut, but just as she's about to start, Lou and Hank arrive. Hanzee fires at them before Peggy stabs him in the shoulder with her scissors. He manages to escape, but Ed and Peggy are captured. Due to them not being in their own jurisdiction, Lou and Hank call in the South Dakota State Police.

When Ed reveals his upcoming rendezvous with Milligan to hand over the now-dead Dodd, State Police Captain Jeb Cheney hatches a dangerous scheme for Ed and Peggy to wear a wire for the meeting, hoping to implicate Milligan and the Kansas City mob. When Lou strongly opposes this idea knowing that Milligan would see right through the ruse, Cheney has him escorted to the state line, though Hank elects to stay behind. After Ed and Peggy agree to the plan in exchange for lesser criminal charges, the police set up an ambush at the motel meeting spot, only for Hanzee to observe their actions from a distance. Hanzee later uses this to betray the Gerhardts, informing them that Kansas City is holding Dodd captive. Meanwhile, Lou, who has discovered that Hanzee killed a gas station attendant, goes back to warn the others that Hanzee likely knows of their plan. At the same time, Lou is unaware that Betsy has fallen seriously ill back home. Lou arrives at the motel too late as the Gerhardts have ambushed Cheney and the other officers and massacred all of them, only realizing their mistake when Hank and Ben begin shooting back while in uniform. He fires at Bear, who is unfazed, and begins to wrestle with and strangle Lou before the same UFO that Rye encountered appears above them, distracting nearly everyone left alive. Lou uses the opportunity to shoot a distracted Bear in the head, while Peggy uses a pot of boiling coffee to wound Hanzee in order to escape with Ed. Hanzee fires at them, causing the UFO to leave. Lou begins firing at Hanzee, but misses and he escapes. With the entire Gerhardt family and all of the South Dakota state troopers now dead except for a wounded Hank and Schmidt, Lou continues his pursuit of both the Blumquists and Hanzee.

Hanzee chases Ed and Peggy, with Lou not far behind attempting to bring an end to the madness. Hanzee kills a passing motorist whom Ed and Peggy flag down before wounding Ed as he and Peggy flee down an alley. The pair take shelter in a supermarket, hiding in the meat locker. While holed up inside, Ed confides to Peggy that he does not think they will make it as a couple, upsetting her. He then succumbs to blood loss, causing Peggy to break down mentally and hallucinate that Hanzee has lit the supermarket on fire in an attempt to smoke them out, when in actuality, Hanzee has fled the scene. Lou, now aided by Schmidt, arrives and subdues Peggy. While driving her back to Minnesota to be prosecuted, the two converse about life and death, with Peggy finally accepting her fate. Meanwhile, Betsy has recuperated from the side-effects of the experimental cancer drug she was taking. When Lou returns home, he, Betsy, and Hank gather around as the three ponder what the future holds for each of them and for their family.

== Production ==
Patrick Wilson was Noah Hawley's initial pick for the role of a younger Lou Solverson in season two. Wilson, along with the rest of the cast, worked with a dialect coach prior to the filming of the series.

Hawley purposely tried to distinguish the younger version of Lou and the older version of Lou, saying that "Patrick Wilson has a confidence and he's comfortable, but he's not Keith Carradine yet. This journey will get him to a place where he can finally settle into his life and really be back from the war."

== Reception ==
Wilson received critical acclaim for his performance. Matt Zoller Seitz of Vulture compared Wilson's performance to Robert De Niro's Academy Award winning performance as a young Vito Corleone in The Godfather Part II, writing: "It's a remarkable feat of acting continuity, in that it syncs up perfectly with Carradine's performance in season one, yet it never feels like Wilson is doing an impression. He's a young man, and he's in good shape, but he carries himself like an older, heavier one, as if weighed down by burdens he hasn't fully acknowledged because he's not ready yet. You get a sense of a personality, perhaps a soul, in the process of evolving. It deserves to be likened to Robert DeNiro's work as the young Vito Corleone in The Godfather: Part II. I don't make that comparison lightly. He's that good."

Alan Sepinwall of Hitfix, wrote that "there's still that irrepressible sense of upper Midwestern politeness, even in the face of horror and madness, and given spectacular voice by Wilson. He doesn't much resemble the young Keith Carradine, but the role's otherwise a perfect fit for the contrast between his bland, square-jawed demeanor and the obvious intelligence that's always flashing underneath. Watching Lou slowly but surely untangle the mess he's been handed gives you a fine idea of where Molly got her investigative gifts."

=== Accolades ===
For his performance in season 2, Wilson was nominated for the Critics' Choice Television Award for Best Actor in a Movie/Miniseries and the Golden Globe Award for Best Actor – Miniseries or Television Film.
