= Allison Tolman =

American actress

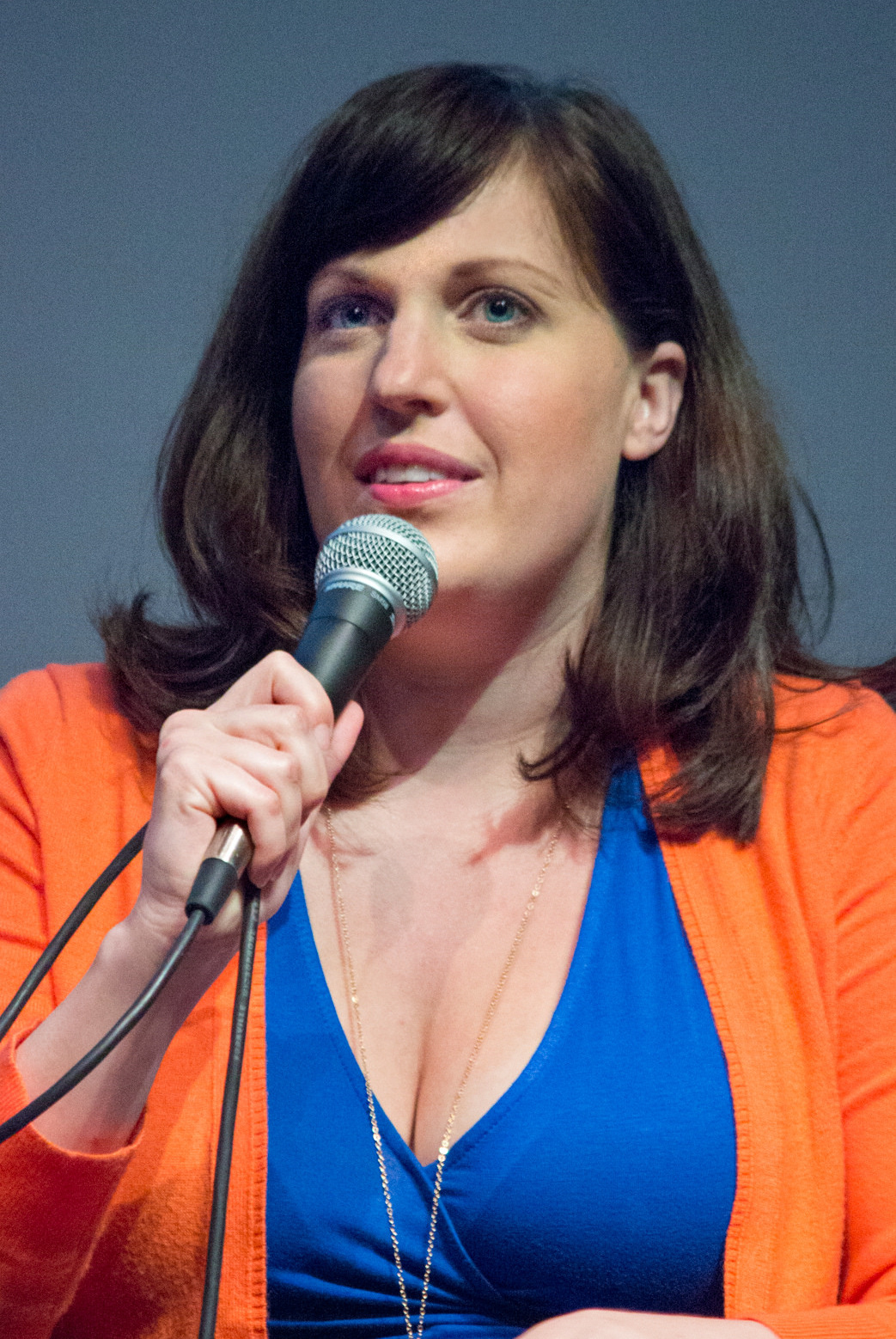
- Tolman in 2014
- Education: Baylor University (BFA)
- Occupation: Actress
- Years active: 2004–present

Allison Tolman is an American actress. She is best known for her roles as Molly Solverson in the first season of the FX television series Fargo, earning Emmy and Golden Globe nominations, and Alma Fillcot in the second season of the Paramount+ anthology series Why Women Kill. Tolman currently stars as Supervising Nurse Alex in the NBC sitcom St. Denis Medical.

== Early life and education ==
Allison Tolman was born to Valerie (née Clohecy) and Davis Nichols Tolman, a petroleum geologist. Tolman has two older brothers and a younger sister. Her family moved to England when she was a few months old and stayed until she was four years old. She spent the next five years in Oklahoma and West Texas, before moving to Sugar Land, Texas. She started taking acting classes when she was 10 years old at the Fort Bend Community Theatre. She attended Clements High School, graduating in 2000.

She graduated from Baylor University with a Bachelor of Fine Arts in theatrical performance. After college, she moved to Dallas, where she was one of the founding members of Second Thought Theatre.

In 2009, she moved to Chicago, Illinois, to study performance at The Second City Training Center.

== Career ==
In 2014, Tolman starred in the first season of the FX black comedy crime series Fargo. Inspired by the 1996 Coen brothers film of the same name, Fargo starred veteran actors Billy Bob Thornton, Martin Freeman and Bob Odenkirk. Tolman received accolades for her performance as Minnesota police officer Molly Solverson, with Vanity Fair writing that she "calmly and assuredly stole the entire show". For her role, she won the Critics' Choice Television Award for Best Supporting Actress in a Movie/Miniseries and received Best Actress nominations at the Emmy Awards and for the Golden Globes.

The same year, it was also announced Tolman would have a two-episode guest role on The Mindy Project as Abby Berman, a romance novelist. In 2015, she had a supporting role in Michael Dougherty's comedy horror film Krampus.

Following her breakout role on Fargo, Tolman declined several supporting parts as mothers, wives and best friends, looking for a more unusual role. In 2017, Tolman starred in ABC's Downward Dog, based on the Animal Media Group web series, which was canceled after one season.

She starred in the ABC drama series Emergence, which premiered on September 24, 2019, and was cancelled after one season on May 21, 2020. She also guest starred in NBC's Good Girls.

In 2021, she starred as Alma Filcott in the second season of the drama series Why Women Kill, and played Natalie Green in The Facts of Life portion of the third edition of Live in Front of a Studio Audience.

In the fall of 2024, Tolman joined the NBC sitcom St. Denis Medical as a leading actress, portraying the character Alex in a main role. The show was recently renewed for a third season.

== Personal life ==
In 2022, when Tolman spent months helping her mother care for her ill father, she watched sitcoms with her mother to cheer her up. Afterward, Tolman commented that getting the St. Denis Medical role "just seemed like kismet".

== Filmography ==
=== Film ===
Year	Title	Role	Notes
2009	A Thousand Cocktails Later	Mandy	Short film
2015	Addicted to Fresno	Ruby	
2015	The Gift	Lucy	
2015	Krampus	Linda	
2017	Barracuda	Merle	
2017	The House	Dawn Mayweather	
2017	Killing Gunther	Mia	
2018	Family	Cheryl Stone	
2018	The Sisters Brothers	Girl Mayfield Saloon	
2020	The Last Shift	Mrs. Kelly	

=== Television ===
Year	Title	Role	Notes
2006	Prison Break	Nurse	Episode: "Scan"
2008	Sordid Lives: The Series	Tink	4 episodes
2014–15	Fargo	Molly Solverson	Main role (season 1), episode: "Palindrome" (season 2)
2014	The Mindy Project	Abby Berman	2 episodes
2014	Hello Ladies: The Movie	Kate	TV movie
2015	Archer	Edie Poovey	Episode: "Edie's Wedding" (voice role)
2015	Comedy Bang! Bang!	Ellen	Episode: "Joseph Gordon-Levitt Wears a Heart T-Shirt and Blue Jeans"
2015	Review	Marissa	Episode: "Brawl; Blackmail; Glory Hole"
2016	Mad Dogs	Rochelle	Recurring role
2016, 2018	Drunk History	Various	2 episodes
2017	Downward Dog	Nan	Main role
2017	Mosaic	Amy Lambson	Recurring role
2017–18	Me, Myself & I	Sarah	2 episodes
2017–19	I'm Sorry	Jennifer	4 episodes
2018	Brooklyn Nine-Nine	Captain Olivia Crawford	2 episodes
2018–19	Good Girls	Mary Pat	Recurring role (seasons 1–2)
2018	Castle Rock	Bridget Strand	2 episodes
2019	The Twilight Zone	Maura McGowan	Episode: "The Wunderkind"
2019–20	Emergence	Jo Evans	Main role
2021	Why Women Kill	Alma Fillcot	Lead role (season 2)
2021	Live in Front of a Studio Audience	Natalie Green	Episode: "The Facts of Life"
2022	Minx	Wanda	Episode: "You Happened to Me"
2022	Gaslit	Winnie McLendon	Recurring role
2023	American Dad!	Jessica	Episode: "Don't You Be My Neighbor" (voice role)
2024–present	St. Denis Medical	Alex	Main role
