= Molly Solverson =

Fargo character

- Fargo character
- Allison Tolman as Molly in the Fargo episode "A Muddy Road"
- First appearance: "The Crocodile's Dilemma" (2014)
- Last appearance: "Palindrome" (2015)
- Created by: Noah Hawley
- Portrayed by: Allison Tolman (adult); Raven Stewart (child)

In-universe information
- Occupation: Season 1: Chief of police; Deputy; Minnesota State Patrol; Season 2: Schoolgirl
- Family: Betsy Solverson (mother); Lou Solverson (father); Hank Larsson (maternal grandfather)
- Spouse: Gus Grimly
- Children: Greta Grimley (stepdaughter); Unnamed son

Molly Solverson is a fictional character in the FX crime anthology television series Fargo, serving as one of the central protagonists of the first season and appearing as a minor character in the second season. She was created by showrunner Noah Hawley, and was portrayed by Allison Tolman as an adult and by Raven Stewart as a child.

Molly is the daughter of former Minnesota State Patrol trooper Lou Solverson, and becomes a police deputy in Bemidji. In January 2006, she dedicates herself to bringing the perpetrator of a series of murders around the area to justice. She is depicted as kind, empathetic, and incredibly driven, and becomes increasingly intelligent and resourceful as the first season goes on.

Tolman received critical acclaim for her performance as Molly in the first season. She was nominated for a Primetime Emmy Award and a Golden Globe Award, and won a Critics' Choice Television Award.

== Character summary ==
Molly Solverson in season two

Solverson is the female protagonist of the first season and appears as a child in a supporting role in the second season. In the first season, she is introduced as a deputy, and is a major figure in the solving of the case involving Lorne Malvo (Billy Bob Thornton) and Lester Nygaard (Martin Freeman). By the end of the season, she is promoted to Chief after Bill Oswalt (Bob Odenkirk) resigns after the death of both Malvo and Nygaard.

In the second season which is set in 1979, Solverson is the daughter of the protagonist of the second season, Lou Solverson, who is one of the major figures involved in the solving of the murder of Rye Gerhardt and the crime that surrounds it. Tolman reprised her role (along with Colin Hanks, Joey King, and Keith Carradine) in a dream sequence by her mother, Betsy Solverson (Cristin Milioti).

== Production ==
Allison Tolman beat over 600 women for the role of Solverson. Tolman, who mostly worked in Chicago theater, only had three credits on her resume when she auditioned for the role. Casting director Rachel Tenner revealed that the casting directors and the producers were always open to an unknown actress accepting the role. She later added that Tolman was the only actress who felt right for the role to her, saying: "The only role we tested was Molly. We saw hundreds of girls trying to do Fargo accents. It's a lot to listen to… Alison felt so organic to this role. She found moments of humor and compassion where nobody else was."

Noah Hawley has stated that the main reason he created the character Vern and Ida Thurman and initially set it up to seem like Vern would be the protagonist of the series, was so that the audience would not compare the character of Molly to Marge Gunderson, the protagonist of the original film, stating: "I knew that if I started the show with "Molly" as the chief of police, everyone was going to make a direct comparison to Frances McDormand and no one could survive that because Frances' performance was so Oscar winning and iconic. So, I snuck "Molly" in through the side door. I created "Vern," and I gave him a pregnant wife, and my thought was well the audience will go oh, I see what they're doing, they just switched this and now the wife is pregnant but he's having a baby, and then I kill him off and "Molly" has been introduced through the side door as a sidekick, so suddenly you realize only in Episode 2 that she is actually the star of the show, but at that point, you haven't judged her against Frances McDormand. So, you've formed an opinion on her based on her performance versus based on somebody else's performance."

== Reception ==
For her performance in the first season, Tolman received widespread critical acclaim, with some critics calling her the "breakout performance" of the show.

Dan Fienberg of HitFix praised Tolman's performance, writing: "Character acting gets no better than the performances by Billy Bob Thornton, Martin Freeman, Oliver Platt, Adam Goldberg, Keith Carradine and a dozen other familiar faces, but it was unknown Chicago theater actress Allison Tolman who grounded this perfectly contained gem of a season."
