= Lorne Malvo =

Fargo character

- Fargo character
- First appearance: "The Crocodile's Dilemma" (2014)
- Last appearance: "Morton's Fork" (2014)
- Created by: Noah Hawley
- Portrayed by: Billy Bob Thornton

In-universe information
- Aliases: Satan; The Devil; Shark Eyes; Duluth; Dr. Michaelson; Saint Paul; Frank Peterson
- Occupation: Hitman; Serial killer
- Significant other: Jemma Stalone

Lorne Malvo is a fictional character in the FX crime anthology television series Fargo, serving as the main antagonist of the first season. He was created by showrunner Noah Hawley and portrayed by Billy Bob Thornton.

Malvo is a psychopathic hitman operating across the Midwestern United States. Between his jobs, he entices others to commit their own sadistic acts of crime and murder, all for his own personal amusement.

== Character overview ==
Malvo is a psychopath who takes pleasure in causing chaos between his murders. He believes social norms are a ruse, as human beings one day decided they were superior to the fellow animals of the jungle and then formed society. He believes people follow nonsense rules that they subconsciously inherit and remain slaves to their entire time. This way, he does not feel guilty as he believes that there is an instinctive drive to kill that he simply fulfills, in a similar way to hunting.

== Fictional biography ==
=== 2006 ===
Lorne Malvo is a hitman based in Reno, Nevada. He is hired to kidnap and presumably murder Phil McCormick. He abducts McCormick from his workplace, strips him of his clothes, and throws him in the trunk of his car. On his way to his destination, Malvo hits a deer outside Bemidji, Minnesota, and goes off the road, injuring his head. The trunk pops open, allowing McCormick to escape; however, he freezes to death in the nearby woods.

While getting his injury checked out at the local hospital, Malvo meets Lester Nygaard, who is waiting to receive treatment after his nose was broken during a public altercation with Sam Hess. Lester tells Malvo about how Hess was his childhood bully. Lester makes a joke about killing Hess, and Malvo takes the suggestion seriously. He asks Lester for confirmation on whether he wants Hess dead or not, but Lester gives no answer. Lester's name is called and a nurse repeatedly urges Lester to move along, which makes him rise in annoyance and yell "yeah" which Malvo interprets as an approval. Later, Malvo murders Hess at a strip club by throwing a knife into the back of his head while Hess is in the middle of having sex with a stripper.

When Lester hears of Hess's death (as his insurance company handled Hess's life insurance policy), he confronts Malvo in a coffee shop, where Malvo encourages him to take matters into his own hands. Later that night, after being aggravated by his wife, Lester murders her and calls Malvo for help. Lester plans to murder Malvo with a shotgun when he arrives and blame his wife's death on him, but the local police chief, Vern Thurman, arrives first, seeking to question him about Hess's murder. As Vern is preparing to arrest Lester after noticing a blood trail that leads to his wife's corpse in the basement, Malvo appears and shoots Thurman twice, retreating downstairs and slipping out as Molly Solverson arrives on the scene. Malvo steals Lester's car and is later pulled over for speeding in Duluth, Minnesota, where he threatens Officer Gus Grimly, who lets him go out of fear.

The next day, Malvo visits a local post office to get a package sent by his employer which contains his new identity: Frank Peterson, a minister and respected member of his community. Malvo then meets with his next client, supermarket "king" Stavros Milos of Phoenix Farms. Malvo is hired to track down the individual blackmailing Stavros, who he later finds out to be Don Chumph, the fitness trainer for Stavros' soon to be ex-wife. Malvo confronts Chumph and takes over the blackmail operation, using Chumph as his lackey in the endeavor. At one point, Gus, who had previously let Malvo go, spots him on the side of the road and arrests him for murder and car theft. Malvo alters his look with a pair of stolen glasses and other alterations to his attire, after having arrived at the police station. He uses his new false identity as Frank Peterson to persuade the police to let him go. As a result of the arrest and subsequent misunderstanding, Gus is put on desk work and removed from the field.

Meanwhile, Malvo begins taunting Stavros psychologically, by killing his dog, replacing his medication with adderall, rigging his shower to spray pig's blood, and releasing hundreds of crickets into Stavros' supermarket. Malvo does this to allude to the Book of Exodus, a play on Stavros' deep religious views. While Stavros decides to take the blackmail money back to where he originally found it in 1987, Malvo rigs Chumph to an exercise machine and tapes a shotgun to his hands. Malvo fires a gun out of the window, shooting at passing pedestrians, to draw police attention, before slipping out a back door. A SWAT team is summoned and guns down Chumph as they make entry into the house, not noticing until too late that he has been tied up. Coincidentally, Stavros' son Dmitri is accidentally killed alongside Stavros' head of corporate security Wally Semenko when their car goes off the road in a freak storm of flying fish, completing Malvo's Book of Exodus plot.

While driving during the whiteout, Malvo's car is attacked and trapped by two Fargo hitmen, Mr. Wrench and Mr. Numbers, seeking revenge for Hess's murder. They then exit their cars and begin shooting at Malvo. After escaping the initial assault, Malvo evades the assailants, taking refuge in the whiteout. Malvo later deliberately cuts the top of his hand and leaves a trail of blood in the snow as bait, which Mr. Numbers follows and is subsequently caught and stabbed repeatedly until he answers Malvo's question about who hired the two hitmen. When he responds with "Fargo", Malvo slits his throat and leaves him to bleed out in the snow. Picking up Mr. Numbers' submachine gun, Malvo moves on, attempting unsuccessfully to find Mr. Wrench.

Now set on finding out who is responsible for the assault, Malvo visits his employer Mr. Rundle in Nevada. When Rundle fails to provide the information he wants, Malvo knocks him unconscious and eventually traces the source of the attack to the Fargo Crime Syndicate. With this new information, Malvo enters the crime syndicate's main base of operations and massacres 22 people within a matter of minutes by himself. Later he locates and pays a visit to Mr. Wrench, who is recovering in the hospital. When he awakens, Malvo taunts Wrench on the death of his partner Mr. Numbers. However, Malvo gives Wrench the key to his handcuffs, and tells him that he respects him for coming closer to killing him than anyone has. He tells Wrench that if he still feels raw about things after he heals, that he should track him down and try again.

=== 2007 ===
One year later, Malvo now lives in Kansas City, Missouri, as a dentist named Michaelson. He is there to befriend Dr. Burt Canton so that he can find and kill Burt's brother, who is in the witness protection program. To get even closer to Canton, Malvo gets engaged to Canton's dental assistant Jemma Stalone. While staying in Las Vegas with Jemma, Canton, and Canton's wife for a night before going to meet and kill Canton's brother, Malvo is recognized by Lester Nygaard, who is in the same bar as him. Lester engages Malvo, but Malvo acts like he has never met him before and threatens him to just walk away while his group is preparing to leave. Lester refuses to pretend that he does not know Malvo and joins him and his group in the elevator. Malvo questions Lester, asking him if this is what he really wants. When Lester says yes, Malvo pulls out his gun and kills Canton, Canton's wife, and Jemma. Malvo tells Lester about how the bounty he was working on for the past 6 months is now defunct, and forces Lester to assist him in dragging and disposing the bodies in a dumpster. Scared for his life, Lester strikes Malvo on the head with his trophy and runs away.

Malvo then follows Lester back to Minnesota and visits Lou Solverson's diner, asking around about Lester's whereabouts, only to leave without the information and only moments before Deputy Molly Solverson and two FBI agents arrive to discuss how to track down Malvo himself. Meanwhile, Lester and his new wife Linda prepare to go to Acapulco to escape Malvo and the police, but need to stop by their shop to get their passports. When Lester sends Linda, wearing his coat, to get the passports to see if Malvo is actually there, Malvo emerges from the shadows and shoots and kills Linda, thinking she was Lester.

Malvo then moves into a remote cabin listening to a police scanner to monitor Lester's interactions with the police. Malvo also breaks into the car of FBI agents Pepper and Budge to get their credentials and to call FBI headquarters to cancel their requested backup. He then visits a local car dealership and steals a car resembling the FBI car, taking the salesman hostage. Malvo then waits outside the police station and trails Lester when the agents drive him home. While Pepper and Budge stand guard outside Lester's house, Malvo's car pulls up in front of them. They go to see who is inside the vehicle and see that the salesman is driving, with his hands duct-taped to the steering wheel. Malvo then approaches them from behind, shooting and killing them both.

Malvo then breaks into Lester's home and steps on a hidden beartrap, severely damaging his left leg. Lester then fires a shot at Malvo, but misses. Lester then tries to shoot again but his gun jams and he goes back to the bathroom. Malvo then leaves, and steals the FBI's car to get back to his cabin. When he arrives, Gus Grimly, who was waiting after spotting him leaving the cabin earlier in the day, confronts Malvo and shoots him point blank in the chest several times. Severely bleeding, Malvo coughs up blood and accepts that the game is up, following his philosophy of survival of the fittest and simply laughs before Gus fatally shoots him in the face.

Gus is commended for bravery for his role in bringing down Malvo. While investigating his cabin, Molly discovers Malvo's collection of tapes, which feature recorded conversations with those Malvo has convinced to commit murder. One of them is a recording of the phone call Lester made to Malvo after Pearl's murder, at long last providing proof of Lester's guilt.

Two weeks later, Lester attempts to flee the law by using a snowmobile in the woods. However, he crashes and attempts to run across a frozen lake, which he falls through and dies in, finally avenging those both he and Malvo killed.

== Reception ==
The character of Lorne Malvo and Thornton's performance received critical acclaim. For his performance in the season, Thornton was nominated for a Primetime Emmy Award and a Screen Actors Guild Award, and won a Golden Globe Award and a Critics' Choice Television Award.

Alan Sepinwall of HitFix praised Thornton's performance, calling it "deadpan genius", and wrote that Thornton "is always a pleasure to watch, but the understated mode he's in for this role is perhaps the best use of his particular talents and screen presence." Maureen Ryan of The Huffington Post also praised Thornton's performance, writing that it "is fascinating from his first moment on the show and steals the entire miniseries out from under everyone. Thornton doesn't just give one great performance, he gives a few, as his crafty character, the dead-eyed lowlife Lorne Malvo, cuts a swath of destruction through the frosty heart of Minnesota. It's a delight to witness the restrained malevolence that rolls off Malvo. Like Los Pollos Hermanos proprietor Gus Fring, Malvo is a man who knows exactly who he is and what he wants to do, and Thornton displays a similar level of coiled yet casual mastery."
