= Lester Nygaard =

Fargo character

- Fargo character
- Martin Freeman as Lester in the Fargo episode "The Crocodile's Dilemma"
- First appearance: "The Crocodile's Dilemma" (2014)
- Last appearance: "Morton's Fork" (2014)
- Created by: Noah Hawley
- Based on: Jerry Lundegaard of Fargo by Joel and Ethan Coen
- Portrayed by: Martin Freeman

In-universe information
- Occupation: Life insurance salesman
- Family: Chazz Nygaard (brother); Kitty Nygaard (sister-in-law); Gordo Nygaard (nephew)
- Spouses: Pearl Nygaard; Linda Park

Lester Nygaard is a fictional character in the FX crime anthology television series Fargo, serving as one of the central characters of the first season. He was created by showrunner Noah Hawley and portrayed by Martin Freeman.

Born and raised in Bemidji, Minnesota, Lester is a meek insurance salesman who is mistreated by nearly everyone in his life, until a chance encounter with hitman Lorne Malvo pushes him to violently act on his repressed anger. Lester develops a pattern of pathological lying to evade the legal consequences for his crimes, and becomes progressively greedier and more self-serving as the season progresses.

== Character overview ==
Lester Nygaard was born in 1966 and has a younger brother, Chazz Nygaard. He attended high school with Sam Hess, Bill Oswalt, and his future wife, Pearl; Hess bullied him constantly throughout high school. Lester and Pearl got married in 1988 when he was 22.

=== 2006 ===
In January 2006, Lester runs into Hess, and when startled by Hess, breaks his nose on a storefront window. At the hospital, Lester meets Lorne Malvo, who casually suggests murdering Hess; Lester neither approves nor rejects the idea. Lester's name is called and a nurse repeatedly urges Lester to move along, which makes him rise in annoyance and yell "yeah" which Malvo interprets as an approval. Malvo subsequently kills Hess at a strip club by throwing a knife into the back of his head while Hess is in the middle of having sex with a stripper.

When Lester hears of Hess's death (as his insurance company handled Hess's life insurance policy), he confronts Malvo in a coffee shop, and is reminded that he never said "no" to the crime. Malvo encourages him to take matters into his own hands. Later that night, after being aggravated by Pearl over his inability to fix their broken washing machine, Lester beats her to death with a hammer, then calls Malvo for assistance. He also grabs a shotgun which he intends to use to kill Malvo and frame him for Pearl's death. Unfortunately, before Malvo gets there, police chief Vern Thurman stops by to question him about Hess's murder, having gotten a tip from someone who overheard Malvo and Nygaard discussing Hess. Thurman immediately notices Lester's shiftiness, sees Pearl's body and prepares to arrest Lester, but Malvo sneaks into the house and shoots Thurman dead. Malvo disappears, and Lester knocks himself out to stage a home invasion. After the police arrive, they suspect Lester is innocent and let him go. Deputy Molly Solverson suspects that Lester killed Hess, Pearl, and Thurman, but Bill Oswalt, the new police chief and a friend of Lester's, assumes a drifter committed the murders. Despite Oswalt's doubts, he and Solverson interview Lester, who claims not to remember anything. Nevertheless, Solverson continues to investigate Lester and is removed from the case as a result.

Lester returns to work and calls Hess's widow, Gina, about his life insurance policy. She unexpectedly starts flirting with him in an attempt to get more money, unaware that Mr. Wrench and Mr. Numbers, two hitmen sent from Fargo, North Dakota to kill Hess's murderer, are watching from outside. Convinced he killed Hess, they visit Lester's office and threaten him, but leave when Solverson unexpectedly arrives. Solverson claims that she is interested in a life insurance policy and "accidentally" shows Lester a surveillance camera picture of Malvo from an abduction he committed shortly before meeting Lester. Lester's panicked reaction convinces her that he recognizes Malvo. She tells Oswalt about this, but is made more upset by visiting him. Later, Numbers and Wrench attempt to kidnap Lester, but he escapes. When they chase him down, he punches a police officer in order to be taken into custody. In order to get arrested so they can see Lester again, Wrench and Numbers stage a bar fight, and are put into Lester's cell and force him to give up Malvo's name.

Lester is hospitalized after his right hand gets severely infected from a shotgun pellet wound sustained when Malvo shot Thurman. On the way to the hospital, Solverson rides in the ambulance and tries to get more information from Lester. She presents her evidence to Oswalt, who is starting to question Lester's innocence. Realizing he's close to getting caught, Lester sneaks out of the hospital, visits Chazz's house, and plants evidence in his gun cabinet; he also places one of his brother's guns in his nephew's backpack, to ensure the police will search Chazz's house. This allows Lester to frame Chazz for Pearl and Thurman's murders, leading to his release from jail while Chazz is incarcerated. Lester agrees to have sex with Gina in exchange for approving her husband's insurance policy, neglecting to tell her that Sam had in fact actually stopped paying the policy several months earlier. Later, Gina and her sons angrily storm into Lester's office, but he manages to repel them with a stapler. Lester's assertive behavior impresses his coworker, Linda, whom he later marries during the one year time skip.

=== 2007 ===
One year later in Las Vegas, Lester receives an award for Insurance Salesman of the Year. While at the hotel bar, he spots Malvo with three acquaintances. Malvo initially pretends not to recognize him, then quietly warns him to "walk away." When Lester refuses to back down and demands Malvo address him, Malvo shoots his acquaintances in front of him. Instead of helping Malvo hide the bodies, Lester hits him over the head with his award and runs back to his hotel room to fetch Linda.

When they get home, Lester promises Linda that they are going on a vacation to Mexico. Lester tells Linda to go inside and pack for their trip, saying to himself that they will probably never come back. As she goes upstairs, Lester checks everywhere to be sure Malvo isn't waiting for him. He goes into the basement and pulls out Chazz's old hunting gear from a pile of boxes. In it is a bear trap, as well as a pistol with magazines, which he puts in his back pocket. But as they are about to leave, Solverson stops by to ask about the murders in Vegas, as Lester was the one to call them in.

Solverson questions Lester and Linda about the events of the murder. Lester makes up a story, saying he never met anyone on his way back to the hotel room. Solverson asks why they tried to board a plane at the last minute, Linda backs up Lester's story by saying they left because she was homesick. Solverson finishes up and leaves, but before she does she tells them the Las Vegas Metropolitan Police will be sending over some security footage, so they should avoid leaving town.

Linda is about to bring up their trip, but Lester assures her that they will stay put. Later that night, Lester purchases plane tickets out of Minneapolis. Before leaving town, Lester says they need to stop by the office to pick up some cash and their passports from the safe. In the parking lot, Lester notices a light that he didn't turn on. Suspecting that Malvo is hiding inside and waiting to ambush them, he sends Linda into the office wearing his coat to get what they came for. Sure enough, it is Malvo, who shoots Linda in the back of her head. Realizing his mistake, Malvo exits the building and scans the parking lot for Lester. Seeing no one, he lights a cigarette and walks away as Lester nervously watches from a distance. Once Malvo leaves the area, Lester goes into the insurance shop in order to get the money from the safe. Before leaving, he covers up the crime scene in order to make it look like he was never there. Lester then goes to Lou's Coffee Shop, and tells the owner that Linda will be right over because she has to get something from the store. He then excuses himself to the bathroom, but actually goes out the back door to make an anonymous phone call to the police, saying that he heard gunshots. Following the call, he sneaks back into the coffee shop.

Solverson receives word of Linda's death. While she is questioning him, Lester tries but fails to retrieve the tickets from the jacket that Linda is wearing. The police bring Lester back to the station where he refuses to answer any questions. The next morning, Lester is allowed to return home, but must be accompanied by FBI agents Pepper and Budge. Malvo later sees Lester being taken home by the FBI agents, and follows in his own car. Once they've returned Lester home, the two FBI agents remain outside, and Malvo sneaks up behind both of them and murders them. Malvo enters Lester's house, and each stalks but fails to kill the other. Malvo strikes Lester in the face with Lester's award, bloodying his face and mirroring the injury inflicted on Lester by Sam Hess a year earlier. Though Lester's gun jams, Malvo's foot gets caught in Lester's bear trap, and he escapes severely injured. Malvo retreats to his nearby cabin to treat his injury, and is killed by Officer Gus Grimly, who saw Malvo outside of it earlier that day. When the police arrive, they find Malvo's trove of audio tapes, including a recording of the phone call Lester made to Malvo requesting his help in covering up Pearl's death.

Two weeks later, Lester is shown on a snowmobile attempting to escape to Canada via Glacier National Park in Montana. Being sought now that his role in the deaths of Pearl and Thurman has been established, Lester is recognized by police, who pursue him on snowmobiles. Lester tries to escape but crashes his snowmobile. Desperate, he escapes on foot, only to fall through thin ice into a lake, dying within seconds with his hat remaining on top of the water.

== Production ==
Freeman was initially hesitant to accept the role, because he was not interested in doing more television and didn't want to leave London to film another project due to him just getting off filming The Hobbit, a project that caused him to be away from his family for a long period of time. But he was very impressed by the idea that it would only be ten episodes, stating, "The reason I've never gone for pilot season even as a younger actor, and wouldn't entertain that sort of thing now, is the idea of signing a piece of paper that binds me for six or seven years. So [Fargo] was already interesting. I read the script and that was enough for me. A very good script that only lasts 10 episodes was like, 'Great! That's right up my street'."

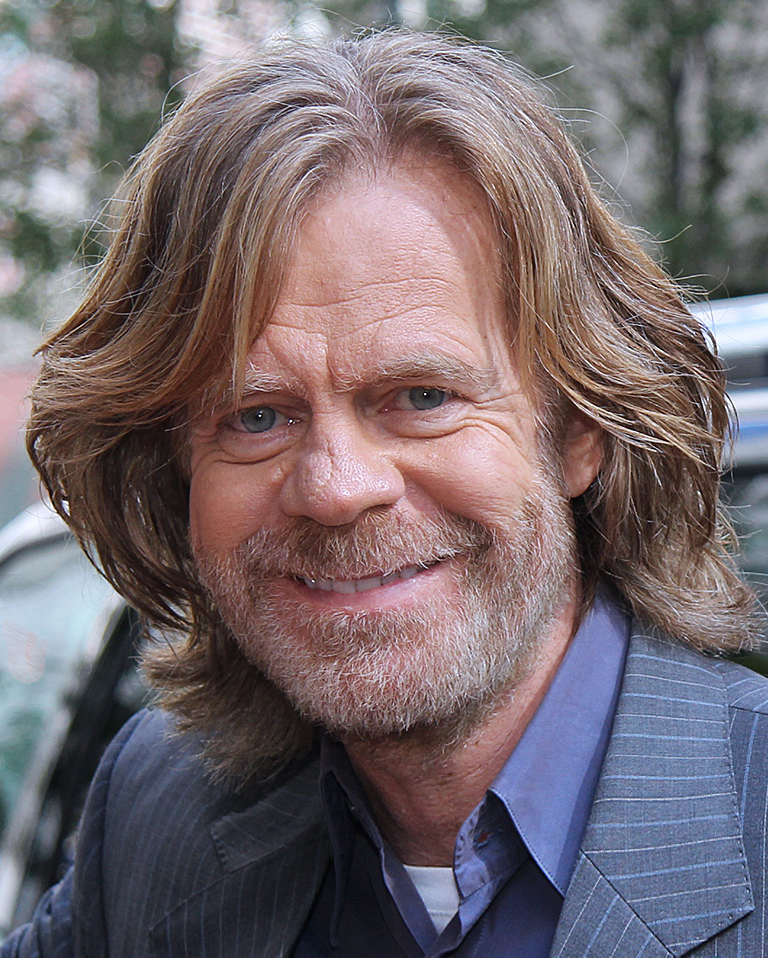
Freeman purposely avoided watching the original film to avoid comparisons to William H. Macy's performance

Freeman kept his Minnesota accent at all times during filming, due to the fear that he would lose it.

Due to the obvious similarities of the characters of Lester and Jerry Lundegaard of the original film, Freeman has stated that he purposely decided not to watch the original film to prevent his role to seem like an imitation of William H. Macy's portrayal of Lundegaard. Freeman was quoted as saying "[Macy's] a brilliant actor and the world doesn't need another actor doing a Bill Macy impression and I don't need to be doing that and he doesn't need it and all of that. So, I purely treated it as my performance of a different character, albeit with some comparison. There are some parallels, but I was too busy concentrating on what I was doing with 'Lester' really. At the risk of protesting too much, I know I'm not playing that."

== Reception ==
For his performance in the first season, Freeman received widespread critical acclaim, with many critics comparing it to William H. Macy's Academy Award-nominated performance in the original 1996 film. Freeman was nominated for a Primetime Emmy Award, a Golden Globe Award, and a Critics' Choice Television Award for the role.

Robert Bianco of USA Today praised the dynamic of Freeman and Billy Bob Thornton, writing that their "brilliantly written and played dynamic gives the warped relationship between Matthew McConaughey and Woody Harrelson in True Detective a run for its money."
