= List of Fargo episodes =

Fargo is an American black comedy crime drama television series created and primarily written by Noah Hawley. The show is inspired by the 1996 film of the same name written and directed by the Coen brothers, who serve as executive producers on the series. It premiered on April 15, 2014, on FX.

In February 2022, the series was renewed for a fifth season, which premiered on November 21, 2023. As of January 16, 2024, 51 episodes of Fargo have aired, concluding the fifth season.

== Series overview ==
| Season | Episodes | Originally released | |
| Season | Episodes | First released | Last released |
|---|---|---|---|
| 1 | 10 | April 15, 2014 | June 17, 2014 |
| 2 | 10 | October 12, 2015 | December 14, 2015 |
| 3 | 10 | April 19, 2017 | June 21, 2017 |
| 4 | 11 | September 27, 2020 | November 29, 2020 |
| 5 | 10 | November 21, 2023 | January 16, 2024 |

== Episodes ==
=== Season 1 (2014) ===
| No. overall | No. in season | Title | Directed by | Written by | Original release date | Prod. code | U.S. viewers (millions) |
|---|---|---|---|---|---|---|---|
| 1 | 1 | "The Crocodile's Dilemma" | Adam Bernstein | Noah Hawley | April 15, 2014 | XFO01001 | 2.65 |
| 2 | 2 | "The Rooster Prince" | Adam Bernstein | Noah Hawley | April 22, 2014 | XFO01002 | 2.04 |
| 3 | 3 | "A Muddy Road" | Randall Einhorn | Noah Hawley | April 29, 2014 | XFO01003 | 1.87 |
| 4 | 4 | "Eating the Blame" | Randall Einhorn | Noah Hawley | May 6, 2014 | XFO01004 | 1.70 |
| 5 | 5 | "The Six Ungraspables" | Colin Bucksey | Noah Hawley | May 13, 2014 | XFO01005 | 1.60 |
| 6 | 6 | "Buridan's Ass" | Colin Bucksey | Noah Hawley | May 20, 2014 | XFO01006 | 1.80 |
| 7 | 7 | "Who Shaves the Barber?" | Scott Winant | Noah Hawley | May 27, 2014 | XFO01007 | 1.52 |
| 8 | 8 | "The Heap" | Scott Winant | Noah Hawley | June 3, 2014 | XFO01008 | 1.86 |
| 9 | 9 | "A Fox, a Rabbit, and a Cabbage" | Matt Shakman | Noah Hawley | June 10, 2014 | XFO01009 | 1.90 |
| 10 | 10 | "Morton's Fork" | Matt Shakman | Noah Hawley | June 17, 2014 | XFO01010 | 1.98 |

=== Season 2 (2015) ===
| No. overall | No. in season | Title | Directed by | Written by | Original release date | Prod. code | U.S. viewers (millions) |
|---|---|---|---|---|---|---|---|
| 11 | 1 | "Waiting for Dutch" | Michael Uppendahl; Randall Einhorn | Noah Hawley | October 12, 2015 | XFO02001 | 1.59 |
| 12 | 2 | "Before the Law" | Noah Hawley | Noah Hawley | October 19, 2015 | XFO02002 | 0.96 |
| 13 | 3 | "The Myth of Sisyphus" | Michael Uppendahl | Bob DeLaurentis | October 26, 2015 | XFO02003 | 1.21 |
| 14 | 4 | "Fear and Trembling" | Michael Uppendahl | Steve Blackman | November 2, 2015 | XFO02004 | 1.28 |
| 15 | 5 | "The Gift of the Magi" | Jeffrey Reiner | Matt Wolpert & Ben Nedivi | November 9, 2015 | XFO02005 | 1.13 |
| 16 | 6 | "Rhinoceros" | Jeffrey Reiner | Noah Hawley | November 16, 2015 | XFO02006 | 1.15 |
| 17 | 7 | "Did You Do This? No, You Did It!" | Keith Gordon | Noah Hawley and Matt Wolpert & Ben Nedivi | November 23, 2015 | XFO02007 | 1.24 |
| 18 | 8 | "Loplop" | Keith Gordon | Bob DeLaurentis | November 30, 2015 | XFO02008 | 1.32 |
| 19 | 9 | "The Castle" | Adam Arkin | Noah Hawley and Steve Blackman | December 7, 2015 | XFO02009 | 1.31 |
| 20 | 10 | "Palindrome" | Adam Arkin | Noah Hawley | December 14, 2015 | XFO02010 | 1.82 |

=== Season 3 (2017) ===
| No. overall | No. in season | Title | Directed by | Written by | Original release date | Prod. code | U.S. viewers (millions) |
|---|---|---|---|---|---|---|---|
| 21 | 1 | "The Law of Vacant Places" | Noah Hawley | Noah Hawley | April 19, 2017 | XFO03001 | 1.42 |
| 22 | 2 | "The Principle of Restricted Choice" | Michael Uppendahl | Noah Hawley | April 26, 2017 | XFO03002 | 1.06 |
| 23 | 3 | "The Law of Non-Contradiction" | John Cameron | Matt Wolpert & Ben Nedivi | May 3, 2017 | XFO03003 | 1.17 |
| 24 | 4 | "The Narrow Escape Problem" | Michael Uppendahl | Monica Beletsky | May 10, 2017 | XFO03004 | 1.05 |
| 25 | 5 | "The House of Special Purpose" | Dearbhla Walsh | Bob DeLaurentis | May 17, 2017 | XFO03005 | 0.98 |
| 26 | 6 | "The Lord of No Mercy" | Dearbhla Walsh | Noah Hawley | May 24, 2017 | XFO03006 | 1.04 |
| 27 | 7 | "The Law of Inevitability" | Mike Barker | Noah Hawley & Matt Wolpert & Ben Nedivi | May 31, 2017 | XFO03007 | 1.03 |
| 28 | 8 | "Who Rules the Land of Denial?" | Mike Barker | Noah Hawley & Monica Beletsky | June 7, 2017 | XFO03008 | 1.14 |
| 29 | 9 | "Aporia" | Keith Gordon | Noah Hawley & Bob DeLaurentis | June 14, 2017 | XFO03009 | 1.19 |
| 30 | 10 | "Somebody to Love" | Keith Gordon | Noah Hawley | June 21, 2017 | XFO03010 | 1.22 |

=== Season 4 (2020) ===
| No. overall | No. in season | Title | Directed by | Written by | Original release date | Prod. code | U.S. viewers (millions) |
|---|---|---|---|---|---|---|---|
| 31 | 1 | "Welcome to the Alternate Economy" | Noah Hawley | Noah Hawley | September 27, 2020 | XFO04001 | 1.22 |
| 32 | 2 | "The Land of Taking and Killing" | Noah Hawley | Noah Hawley | September 27, 2020 | XFO04002 | 0.79 |
| 33 | 3 | "Raddoppiarlo" | Dearbhla Walsh | Noah Hawley | October 4, 2020 | XFO04003 | 0.72 |
| 34 | 4 | "The Pretend War" | Dearbhla Walsh | Noah Hawley and Stefani Robinson | October 11, 2020 | XFO04004 | 0.76 |
| 35 | 5 | "The Birthplace of Civilization" | Dana Gonzales | Noah Hawley and Francesca Sloane | October 18, 2020 | XFO04005 | 0.74 |
| 36 | 6 | "Camp Elegance" | Dana Gonzales | Noah Hawley and Enzo Mileti & Scott Wilson and Francesca Sloane | October 25, 2020 | XFO04011 | 0.70 |
| 37 | 7 | "Lay Away" | Dana Gonzales | Noah Hawley and Enzo Mileti & Scott Wilson | November 1, 2020 | XFO04006 | 0.65 |
| 38 | 8 | "The Nadir" | Sylvain White | Noah Hawley and Enzo Mileti & Scott Wilson | November 8, 2020 | XFO04007 | 0.70 |
| 39 | 9 | "East/West" | Michael Uppendahl | Noah Hawley and Lee Edward Colston II | November 15, 2020 | XFO04008 | 0.82 |
| 40 | 10 | "Happy" | Sylvain White | Noah Hawley | November 22, 2020 | XF004009 | 0.81 |
| 41 | 11 | "Storia Americana" | Dana Gonzales | Noah Hawley | November 29, 2020 | XFO04010 | 0.85 |

=== Season 5 (2023–24) ===
| No. overall | No. in season | Title | Directed by | Written by | Original release date | Prod. code | U.S. viewers (millions) |
|---|---|---|---|---|---|---|---|
| 42 | 1 | "The Tragedy of the Commons" | Noah Hawley | Noah Hawley | November 21, 2023 | XFO05001 | 0.566 |
| 43 | 2 | "Trials and Tribulations" | Noah Hawley | Noah Hawley | November 21, 2023 | XFO05002 | 0.311 |
| 44 | 3 | "The Paradox of Intermediate Transactions" | Donald Murphy | Noah Hawley | November 28, 2023 | XFO05003 | 0.494 |
| 45 | 4 | "Insolubilia" | Donald Murphy | Noah Hawley | December 5, 2023 | XFO05004 | 0.424 |
| 46 | 5 | "The Tiger" | Dana Gonzales | Noah Hawley | December 12, 2023 | XFO05005 | 0.451 |
| 47 | 6 | "The Tender Trap" | Dana Gonzales | Noah Hawley & Bob DeLaurentis | December 19, 2023 | XFO05006 | 0.457 |
| 48 | 7 | "Linda" | Sylvain White | Noah Hawley & April Shih | December 26, 2023 | XFO05007 | 0.576 |
| 49 | 8 | "Blanket" | Sylvain White | Noah Hawley & Thomas Bezucha | January 2, 2024 | XFO05008 | 0.461 |
| 50 | 9 | "The Useless Hand" | Thomas Bezucha | Noah Hawley | January 9, 2024 | XFO05009 | 0.517 |
| 51 | 10 | "Bisquik" | Thomas Bezucha | Noah Hawley | January 16, 2024 | XFO05010 | 0.601 |

== Ratings ==
Fargo : U.S. viewers per episode (millions)

| Season | Episode number | | | | | | | | | | | Average |
| Season | 1 | 2 | 3 | 4 | 5 | 6 | 7 | 8 | 9 | 10 | 11 | Average |
|---|---|---|---|---|---|---|---|---|---|---|---|---|
| 1 | 2.65 | 2.04 | 1.87 | 1.70 | 1.60 | 1.80 | 1.52 | 1.86 | 1.90 | 1.98 | – | 1.89 |
| 2 | 1.59 | 0.96 | 1.21 | 1.28 | 1.13 | 1.15 | 1.24 | 1.32 | 1.31 | 1.82 | – | 1.30 |
| 3 | 1.42 | 1.06 | 1.17 | 1.05 | 0.98 | 1.04 | 1.03 | 1.14 | 1.19 | 1.22 | – | 1.13 |
| 4 | 1.22 | 0.79 | 0.72 | 0.76 | 0.74 | 0.70 | 0.65 | 0.70 | 0.82 | 0.81 | 0.85 | 0.80 |
| 5 | 0.566 | 0.311 | 0.494 | 0.424 | 0.451 | 0.457 | 0.576 | 0.461 | 0.517 | 0.601 | – | 0.486 |

Audience measurement performed by Nielsen Media Research
