= The Nadir =

- Fargo episode
- Episode no.: Season 4 Episode 8
- Directed by: Sylvain White
- Written by: Noah Hawley; Enzo Mileti; Scott Wilson
- Cinematography by: Gonzalo Amat
- Editing by: Curtis Thurber
- Production code: XFO04007
- Original air date: November 8, 2020
- Running time: 51 minutes

Guest appearances
- Timothy Olyphant as Dick "Deafy" Wickware; Kelsey Asbille as Swanee Capps; Kai Lennox as Mort Kellerman

Episode chronology
← Previous "Lay Away"	Next → "East/West"
- Fargo (season 4)

"The Nadir" is the eighth episode of the fourth season of the American anthology black comedy–crime drama television series Fargo. It is the 38th overall episode of the series and was written by series creator Noah Hawley, co-executive producer Enzo Mileti, and co-executive producer Scott Wilson, and directed by Sylvain White. It originally aired on FX on November 8, 2020.

The season is set in Kansas City, Missouri from November 1950 to early 1951, and follows two crime syndicates as they vie for control of the underground. One of these is Loy Cannon, the head of a crime syndicate made up of black migrants fleeing the Jim Crow South who have a contentious relationship with the Italian Kansas City mafia. In the episode, Deafy gets closer to finding Zelmare and Swanee, forcing Loy to reveal their location. Loy, meanwhile, works on his new plan as Gaetano returns with Josto.

According to Nielsen Media Research, the episode was seen by an estimated 0.70 million household viewers and gained a 0.2 ratings share among adults aged 18–49. The episode received positive reviews from critics, who praised the directing and the train station shootout, although the pacing and incoherent narrative received criticism.

== Plot ==
After having sex, Josto (Jason Schwartzman) tells Oraetta (Jessie Buckley) that despite his upcoming marriage, he loves her, which unnerves her. She is also shocked to learn that Dr. Harvard (Stephen Spencer) survived the poisoned macaron. Realizing he will reveal her role in poisoning him, she returns to her apartment to pack her belongings. She discovers a notebook in her closet belonging to Ethelrida (E'myri Crutchfield), making her realize she sent the letter.

When Josto returns to his club, he is shocked to find Gaetano (Salvatore Esposito), who knocks him unconscious. After he wakes up, Josto is surprised when Gaetano states he now respects him for having ordered Satchel's murder. Realizing his plan has backfired, Loy (Chris Rock) calls Mort Kellerman from Fargo for help. He is also visited by Deafy (Timothy Olyphant), who is aware that Loy sent Zelmare (Karen Aldridge) and Swanee (Kelsey Asbille) away from the city and demands to know their location. Loy initially resists, but Deafy mocks his code of honor and ultimately forces Loy into revealing that the duo will be taking the 10pm train to Philadelphia. Deafy leaves, being told by Loy to never come back to the state, threatening violence otherwise.

As Deafy assembles a team to catch Zelmare and Swanee, Odis (Jack Huston) convinces him to let him accompany the team, claiming he wants to change his corrupt nature. However, Odis's OCD causes him to lock himself in the car. At the train station, Zelmare and Swanee notice they are followed and start a gunfight with the police. Odis finally overcomes his OCD and enters the station, seeing many dead police and civilians. He finds Deafy, who has caught Zelmare and Swanee, who asks him to handcuff them. Odis instead kills Deafy, but then also kills Swanee. A devastated Zelmare then escapes the station.

Josto and Gaetano are spending time at their mother's house, when Mort's men arrive and kill many of their henchmen. Gaetano hits back, managing to kill some of Mort's men and forcing them to retreat. However, they go back inside the house and discover that their mother Chianna (Janet Ulrich Brooks) died after being hit by the bullets.

== Production ==
=== Development ===
In October 2020, it was reported that the eighth episode of the season would be titled "The Nadir", and was to be written by series creator Noah Hawley, co-executive producer Enzo Mileti and co-executive producer Scott Wilson, and directed by Sylvain White. This was Hawley's 31st writing credit, Mileti's third writing credit, Wilson's third writing credit, and White's first directing credit.

== Reception ==
=== Viewers ===
In its original American broadcast, "The Nadir" was seen by an estimated 0.70 million household viewers and gained a 0.2 ratings share among adults aged 18–49, according to Nielsen Media Research. This means that 0.2 percent of all households with televisions watched the episode. This was a slight increase in viewership from the previous episode, which was watched by 0.65 million viewers with a 0.1 in the 18-49 demographics.

=== Critical reviews ===
"The Nadir" received positive reviews from critics. Zack Handlen of The A.V. Club gave the episode a "B" grade and wrote, "Not everything really works in 'The Nadir', and even twists that do work feel like they were dropped in from another, better structured season of television. But there are some stylish action set pieces, some unexpected moments, and a general welcome vibe of creepiness and tension. The episode is called 'The Nadir', after all. Some bad news is going to go down. It's just a shame it has to feel so disjoined when it does."

Alan Sepinwall of Rolling Stone wrote, "Structure has very much been lacking from Fargo of late. 'The Nadir' doesn't entirely solve this problem — it's not hard to imagine pieces of the episode having originally co-existed with scenes from the last few before Noah Hawley started re-editing — but it has dramatic highs to cover for it that recent episodes lacked." Nick Schager of Entertainment Weekly wrote, "There's no such thing as a reliable criminal alliance, meaning the fortunes of gangsters are as unpredictable as the wind. 'The Nadir' reinforces that point with thrilling twists which suggest that, for most of these underworld characters, only doom awaits."

Keith Phipps of Vulture gave the episode a 3 star rating out of 5 and wrote, "So where is all this going? Fargo's traditionally been good with propulsive action scenes and dialogue-driven character moments, but much of 'The Nadir' plays like a shapeless collection of the latter capped by the former. It's not a bad episode at all, though the familiarity of the shoot-out is a bit much." Nick Harley of Den of Geek gave the episode a 3.5 star rating out of 5 and wrote, "Regardless of how I felt about it, there's going to be no talk of deescalating the war now that Josto and Gateano lost their mother. Like the specter of death that seems to be floating around this season, a messy, violent ending seems to be inevitable. Let's just hope that things are messy in a narrative sense, and not in the underwhelming way that we saw in tonight's episode." Scott Tobias of The New York Times wrote, "For the most part, this episode was an entertaining jumble of loose ends and Plan Bs, full of characters who are scrambling to figure out how to act when their schemes have been blown up. With various subplots zipping every which way, there's not any single unifying idea that binds the hour together, but at this point in the season, there's just too much narrative business that needs to be resolved."

=== Accolades ===
TVLine named Jessie Buckley as the "Performer of the Week" for the week of November 14, 2020, for her performance in the episode. The site wrote, "With her aw-shucks accent and cute Minnesota-isms, Nurse Oraetta Mayflower seems at first glance to be from the same good-hearted Midwestern stock as Fargo's original Marge Gunderson. But behind that kindly smile lies a cold-blooded killer, and Buckley — already Season 4's MVP — hit new heights this week as Oraetta opened up about her twisted childhood... and started to see her master plan fall apart."
