= The Land of Taking and Killing =

- Fargo episode
- Episode no.: Season 4 Episode 2
- Directed by: Noah Hawley
- Written by: Noah Hawley
- Cinematography by: Dana Gonzales
- Editing by: Debby Germino; Regis Kimble
- Production code: XFO04002
- Original air date: September 27, 2020
- Running time: 58 minutes

Guest appearances
- Glynn Turman as Doctor Senator; Timothy Olyphant as Dick "Deafy" Wickware; Kelsey Asbille as Swanee Capps; Tommaso Ragno as Donatello Fadda; Sean Fortunato as Antoon Dumini; Ed Kross as Allen Sneet

Episode chronology
← Previous "Welcome to the Alternate Economy"	Next → "Raddoppiarlo"
- Fargo (season 4)

"The Land of Taking and Killing" is the second episode of the fourth season of the American anthology black comedy–crime drama television series Fargo. It is the 32nd overall episode of the series and was written and directed by series creator Noah Hawley. It originally aired on FX on September 27, 2020, airing back-to-back with the previous episode, "Welcome to the Alternate Economy".

The season is set in Kansas City, Missouri from November 1950 to early 1951, and follows two crime syndicates as they vie for control of the underground. One of these is Loy Cannon, the head of a crime syndicate made up of black migrants fleeing the Jim Crow South who have a contentious relationship with the Italian Kansas City mafia. In the episode, Ethelrida's aunt escapes from prison with her lover, setting to stay in her house. Meanwhile, Loy and Senator plan their next move while Josto struggles with the arrival of his brother, Gaetano.

According to Nielsen Media Research, the episode was seen by an estimated 0.79 million household viewers and gained a 0.1 ratings share among adults aged 18–49. The episode received generally positive reviews from critics, who praised the conflicts, performances and more straightforward narrative, although some still expressed criticism for the amount of characters and subplots.

== Plot ==
Bank robbers Zelmare Roulette (Karen Aldridge) and Swanee Capps (Kelsey Asbille) escape from prison. After stealing clothing, they reach the Smutny residence, revealing that Zelmare is the sister of Dibrell (Anji White). Ethelrida (E'myri Crutchfield) greets her aunt, while Dibrell reluctantly allows both Zelmare and Swanee to stay.

Fadda henchmen perform a drive-by shooting at the private hospital for refusing to treat Donatello, killing a nurse and a wealthy socialite; Dr. Harvard (Stephen Spencer) survives. While visiting her family's funeral home for formaldehyde, Ethelrida sees the Fadda family mourn the loss of Donatello, exchanging eye contact with his newly-arrived son, Gaetano (Salvatore Esposito). Oraetta (Jessie Buckley) is also present at the funeral, claiming she did everything she could to save Donatello. Josto (Jason Schwartzman) is angry when he finds that the assassination attempt on Harvard failed and is informed by his mother Chianna (Janet Ulrich Brooks) that someone took Donatello's ring.

Loy (Chris Rock) and Doctor Senator (Glynn Turman) discuss their next move, as Donatello was planning to hand over a front disguised as a slaughterhouse to Loy. They decide to seize the slaughterhouse, deeming that the deal was official. A policeman, Odis Weff (Jack Huston), investigates the shooting, with Harvard claiming that the Faddas are responsible. As he can't identify the shooters, Weff leaves, showing he suffers from nervous tics. Josto, while speaking with Gaetano, intends to respect all of the deals that Donatello made, while Gaetano prefers in attacking the Cannon Limited. Josto is informed by Odis, revealed to be working for him, about Harvard's condition, telling him to stay out of trouble.

Oraetta is fired after trying to poison a patient. She returns home, finding Ethelrida at her porch, telling her she will bake her a pie. Senator brings henchmen to the slaughterhouse, reclaiming it as part of the Cannon Limited's territory. Gaetano arrives, suspecting that their deal was not legitimate. Senator and his henchmen leave, confident that they will return. Everyone gathers in their respective houses for dinner, with Thurman (Andrew Bird) finding the pie baked by Oraetta, unaware that she laced it with ipecac. Outside the Smutny residence, a police force led by Odis and U.S. Marshal Dick "Deafy" Wickware (Timothy Olyphant) arrive at the front door, with Deafy kicking the door to get in.

== Production ==
=== Development ===
In September 2020, it was reported that the second episode of the season would be titled "The Land of Taking and Killing", and was to be written and directed by series creator Noah Hawley. This was Hawley's 25th writing credit, and his fourth directing credit.

== Reception ==
=== Viewers ===
In its original American broadcast, "The Land of Taking and Killing" was seen by an estimated 0.79 million household viewers and gained a 0.1 ratings share among adults aged 18–49, according to Nielsen Media Research. This means that 0.1 percent of all households with televisions watched the episode. This was a 36% decrease in viewership from the previous episode, which was watched by 1.22 million viewers with a 0.2 in the 18-49 demographics.

=== Critical reviews ===
"Welcome to the Alternate Economy" received generally positive reviews from critics. Zack Handlen of The A.V. Club gave the episode a "B" grade and wrote, "By the end of the second episode, there's enough conflict and unease coming from every sector that it's easy to imagine how the show moves forward even if it's hard to predict any one thread in specific. Goofy shit happens alongside incredibly violent shit. Characters speak in heightened, convoluted eloquence at rough contrast with their behaviors. The pace is sloooooow."

Alan Sepinwall of Rolling Stone wrote, "The two-night premiere concludes on that most American of holidays, Thanksgiving, when the usual overeating seems on the verge of interruption by a few dozen cops approaching the mortuary where Ethelrida and her parents live (and where Zelmare and Swanee have been hiding out). Imminent violence in the middle of a celebration of how settlers first arrived? Seems about right for a start." Nick Schager of Entertainment Weekly wrote, "Murder always runs in the family in Fargo. Thus, it's only natural that tensions between brothers, fathers, and sons, and mothers and daughters are ever-present in 'The Land of Talking and Killing', which begins setting the season’s hostile narrative gears in motion."

Keith Phipps of Vulture gave the episode a 4 star rating out of 5 and wrote, "Like the fourth-season debut, this second episode has to expend a lot of energy putting pieces into place, which it does fairly gracefully in ways that suggest some minor characters will have more to do later on. But it also pushes the story forward more than might be expected." Nick Harley of Den of Geek gave the episode a 3.5 star rating out of 5 and wrote, "The episode ends with Mayflower leaving the pie on the Smutny porch. Shortly after she departs, a group of police officers arrive, ready to kick down their door. It's likely that they're looking for Zelame and Swanee, but perhaps it has something to do with Cannon, or potentially even Mayflower herself. There's a lot of chaos stirring on this new season Fargo, and things are only bound to get worse." Scott Tobias of The New York Times wrote, "The title of the second episode is spoken by Gaetano, the Faddas's brutal new enforcer from Italy: 'In the land of taking and killing, Gaetano is king.' What kind of land America is — and who controls it and how — will be a central question on Fargo this season. And a lot of blood will be spilled to answer it."
