= Raddoppiarlo =

- Fargo episode
- Episode no.: Season 4 Episode 3
- Directed by: Dearbhla Walsh
- Written by: Noah Hawley
- Cinematography by: Paula Huidobro
- Editing by: Curtis Thurber
- Production code: XFO04003
- Original air date: October 4, 2020
- Running time: 62 minutes

Guest appearances
- Glynn Turman as Doctor Senator; Timothy Olyphant as Dick "Deafy" Wickware; Kelsey Asbille as Swanee Capps; Guy Van Swearingen as Captain Martin Hanhuck

Episode chronology
← Previous "The Land of Taking and Killing"	Next → "The Pretend War"
- Fargo (season 4)

"Raddoppiarlo" is the third episode of the fourth season of the American anthology black comedy–crime drama television series Fargo. It is the 33rd overall episode of the series and was written by series creator Noah Hawley and directed by Dearbhla Walsh. It originally aired on FX on October 4, 2020.

The season is set in Kansas City, Missouri from November 1950 to early 1951, and follows two crime syndicates as they vie for control of the underground. One of these is Loy Cannon, the head of a crime syndicate made up of black migrants fleeing the Jim Crow South who have a contentious relationship with the Italian Kansas City mafia. In the episode, U.S. Marshall Dick "Deafy" Wickware arrives in town to find Zelmare and Swanee, who both plan to rob one of Loy's fronts.

According to Nielsen Media Research, the episode was seen by an estimated 0.72 million household viewers and gained a 0.1 ratings share among adults aged 18–49. The episode received positive reviews from critics, who praised the tension, production design and humor, although some expressed criticism for the writing and some performances.

== Plot ==
U.S. Marshal Dick "Deafy" Wickware (Timothy Olyphant) investigates the area where Zelmare (Karen Aldridge) and Swanee (Kelsey Asbille) fled after escaping prison. He meets with police captain Martin Hanhuck (Guy Van Swearingen), making him uneasy about his Mormon beliefs. Odis (Jack Huston) is assigned to help Deafy with the pursuit.

At night, Deafy and Odis stand outside the Smutny residence, noticing Oraetta (Jessie Buckley) bringing a pie and leaving after putting it on the front door. With police backup, they raid the house, looking for Zelmare and Swanee. Dibrell (Anji White) and Ethelrida (E'myri Crutchfield) claim they didn't see them, so Deafy and the officers start inspecting the home. Unable to find them, Deafy and the officers leave. Meanwhile, Oraetta manages to find a job at the private hospital run by Dr. Harvard (Stephen Spencer). As she exits the hospital, she sees Josto (Jason Schwartzman) watching over the building, looking for Harvard. Thinking he is after her, she enters his car, where she gives him a line of cocaine and masturbates him with her hand.

Feeling impatient with Josto's lack of proper leadership, Gaetano (Salvatore Esposito) decides to handle the problem with the slaughterhouse by himself. He convinces some of the Fadda family's henchmen, including hitman Constant Calamita (Gaetano Bruno), to join him in his plan. Intending to make a hit on Loy (Chris Rock), Gaetano has his henchmen and Rabbi (Ben Whishaw) follow his son, Lemuel (Matthew Elam), and kill him. Rabbi is instructed to shoot him, but he hesitates as he feels unsure if Josto ordered the hit. Calamita is angered but is told by Rabbi that as Josto did not authorize the order, nothing can happen to him.

Zelmare and Swanee leave the Smutny residence, with the help of Thurman (Andrew Bird) through a casket. They end up in front of the slaughterhouse, intending to rob it. Using one of Thurman's shotguns, they rob Loy's employees. Having eaten Oraetta's pie, which she laced with ipecac, Swanee constantly vomits, almost ruining the heist. They escape with $20,000 after killing three of Loy's men, although Swanee vomits on the money. After being informed of the incidents, Loy deduces Josto is involved and intends to hit back. Doctor Senator (Glynn Turman) convinces Loy to first investigate the events, fearing that jumping right into war would not be the best idea.

== Production ==
=== Development ===
In September 2020, it was reported that the third episode of the season would be titled "Raddoppiarlo", and was to be written by series creator Noah Hawley and directed by Dearbhla Walsh. This was Hawley's 26th writing credit, and Walsh's third directing credit.

== Reception ==
=== Viewers ===
In its original American broadcast, "Raddoppiarlo" was seen by an estimated 0.72 million household viewers and gained a 0.1 ratings share among adults aged 18–49, according to Nielsen Media Research. This means that 0.1 percent of all households with televisions watched the episode. This was a 9% decrease in viewership from the previous episode, which was watched by 0.79 million viewers with a 0.1 in the 18-49 demographics.

=== Critical reviews ===
"Raddoppiarlo" received positive reviews from critics. Zack Handlen of The A.V. Club gave the episode a "B+" grade and wrote, "'Raddoppiarlo' isn't a triumph, but it's considerably more engaging to watch, creating the sense of rising, idiosyncratic tension that Fargo seasons have come to rely on. Whereas the two episode premiere often seemed to get bogged down in its own whimsy, this hour is coherent and more direct. There's still the indulgence in rambling and slow burn that we've come to expect, but for a wonder, some of those slow burns actual result in suspense. It's even possible to walk away with the faith that there's a real plot here, and not just a collection of incidents that might, eventually, at some point, collect into a story."

Alan Sepinwall of Rolling Stone wrote, "It’s hard not to blame them for feeling uncertain, or even for Josto to keep forgetting about Oraetta, because everyone is dealing with so much already. And based on the way Fargo works, you shouldn’t expect things to get less complicated anytime soon." Nick Schager of Entertainment Weekly wrote, "Fargo's gangland warfare has, to date, escalated at a surprisingly unhurried pace. Nonetheless, 'Raddoppiarlo' finds the show's various factions all making plays to seize power — many of them violent in nature."

Keith Phipps of Vulture gave the episode a 4 star rating out of 5 and wrote, "When we last visited Fargo, a series now set in Kansas City, we watched a familiar face, playing an unfamiliar character, launch a raid on the King of Tears mortuary. 'Raddoppiarlo', season four's third episode, wastes little time revealing the details of Timothy Olyphant's character."

Nick Harley of Den of Geek gave the episode a 3.5 star rating out of 5 and wrote, "While not flawless, this episode was absolutely stuffed with compelling action, even if we can do with a little less speechifying. While I enjoyed Chris Rock in the premiere, I feel like he's pulling his natural charisma back a little too far in this episode. Jason Schwartzman appears to have the opposite problem, being just a tad too anachronistic to the point of seeming miscast. However, I'm still onboard with the latest season of Fargo and I'm curious to see how the Cannon's respond to the threats, real or perceived, as well as how Josto will deal with the power grab that's being attempted by his brother." Scott Tobias of The New York Times wrote, "This is the type of plotting that Fargo has always handled well, when violence breaks out and characters scramble to figure out how to harness the fallout to their favor. Hawley just needs to gets out of his own way. Sometimes less is more."
