= The Pretend War =

- Fargo episode
- Episode no.: Season 4 Episode 4
- Directed by: Dearbhla Walsh
- Written by: Noah Hawley; Stefani Robinson
- Cinematography by: Paula Huidobro
- Editing by: Jordan Goldman; Curtis Thurber
- Production code: XFO04004
- Original air date: October 11, 2020
- Running time: 56 minutes

Guest appearances
- Glynn Turman as Doctor Senator; Timothy Olyphant as Dick "Deafy" Wickware; Kelsey Asbille as Swanee Capps; Sean Fortunato as Antoon Dumini

Episode chronology
| ← Previous "Raddoppiarlo" | Next → "The Birthplace of Civilization" |
- Fargo (season 4)

"The Pretend War" is the fourth episode of the fourth season of the American anthology black comedy–crime drama television series Fargo. It's the 34th overall episode of the series and was written by series creator Noah Hawley and supervising producer Stefani Robinson and directed by Dearbhla Walsh. It originally aired on FX on Oct. 11, 2020.

The season is set in Kansas City, Missouri from November 1950 to early 1951, and follows two crime syndicates as they vie for control of the underground. One of these is Loy Cannon, the head of a crime syndicate made up of black migrants fleeing the Jim Crow South who have a contentious relationship with the Italian Kansas City mafia. In the episode, tensions between the Cannon Limited and the Fadda Family increase after the robbery at the slaughterhouse.

According to Nielsen Media Research, the episode was seen by an estimated 0.76 million household viewers and gained a 0.1 ratings share among adults aged 18–49. The episode received mostly positive reviews from critics, who viewed the episode as an improvement over the previous episodes, highlighting the directing, tension and cinematography as strong points.

== Plot ==
While smuggling weapons in a truck, Calamita (Gaetano Bruno) is intercepted in the road by henchmen from the Cannon Limited. They kill the truck's driver, steal the weapons and brand Calamita's left cheek with a burning gun barrel. Loy (Chris Rock) then sells the weapons to Mort Kellerman and the Fargo Mafia at cost, reserving a favor from them in the event that they're needed during a war with the Fadda family.

Fadda consigliere Ebal Violante (Francesco Acquaroli) is angered by the attack but is confused when Doctor Senator (Glynn Turman) mentions the assassination attempt on Lemuel (Matthew Elam). Rabbi (Ben Whishaw) informs Josto (Jason Schwartzman) about the failed hit, saying Gaetano (Salvatore Esposito) ordered it. Josto is angered by the revelation. It is also revealed that Josto is now in a sexual relationship with Oraetta (Jessie Buckley). Oraetta, meanwhile, is approached by Ethelrida (E'myri Crutchfield) about a potential job offer, as her family is struggling. Oraetta agrees to hire her as a housekeeper.

Josto confronts Gaetano for giving orders without his permission, threatening to shoot him at the genitals. He then leaves to meet with Odis (Jack Huston), who was forced to bring Deafy (Timothy Olyphant) with him. Deafy briefly talks with Gaetano, remarking that he wiped out an Italian crime family in Salt Lake City. Meanwhile, while cleaning Oraetta's house, Ethelrida finds a secret closet where she keeps various poisons, mementos from her victims and newspaper clippings about her killings. She decides to leave the house after stealing a clipping and Donatello's ring, forgetting her notebook in the closet.

Loy and his henchmen confront Rabbi, despite his claim that he saved Lemuel from the assassination attempt. Loy wants him to bring Satchel back, but Rabbi claims it wouldn't be the best choice as it would ignite war. Loy threatens to kill Rabbi if anything happens to his kids. Zelmare (Karen Aldridge), who is hiding with Swanee (Kelsey Asbille) at a motel room, visits Thurman (Andrew Bird) and gives him part of the money they stole in order to pay Loy back the loan, not aware that she stole it from him. He visits Loy at his house, paying him the money, ending his debt to him. After he leaves, Loy smells the vomit on the money, angrily discovering that it was his own robbed money. Thurman returns home, telling his family that everything will be fine, although Dibrell (Anji White) is not content that her sister was involved in getting the money.

== Production ==
=== Development ===
In September 2020, it was reported that the fourth episode of the season would be titled "The Pretend War", and was to be written by series creator Noah Hawley and supervising producer Stefani Robinson, and directed by Dearbhla Walsh. This was Hawley's 27th writing credit, Robinson's first writing credit, and Walsh's fourth directing credit.

== Reception ==
=== Viewers ===
In its original American broadcast, "The Pretend War" was seen by an estimated 0.76 million household viewers and gained a 0.1 ratings share among adults aged 18–49, according to Nielsen Media Research. This means that 0.1 percent of all households with televisions watched the episode. This was a slight increase in viewership from the previous episode, which was watched by 0.72 million viewers with a 0.1 in the 18-49 demographics.

=== Critical reviews ===
"The Pretend War" received mostly positive reviews from critics. Zack Handlen of The A.V. Club gave the episode a "B+" grade and wrote, "I'm not going call this a 'table setting' episode, because arguably most of Fargo's episodes fall into that category, to the point where it's a fairly useless distinction. But in terms of both escalating conflicts and finding ways to remind us of what's at stake in all of this, 'War' does a good job at turning the old screw."

Alan Sepinwall of Rolling Stone wrote, "The episode surrounding that postcoital conversation is full of characters trying to puzzle out what's real and what's a hustle, or making big shows of force without yet delivering on much of the threatened violence. It makes for another busy hour where our omniscient point of view gives us a much clearer picture of what's happening than anyone down on the ground has, even if some characters, like Doctor Senator and Deafy Wickware, are smart enough to make good, educated guesses." Nick Schager of Entertainment Weekly wrote, "No one's ever quite sure what anyone else is up to in Fargo, but that begins to change in 'The Pretend War', which finds the show's contentious factions all gaining a greater understanding of the motives and machinations of their rivals, neighbors, and significant others. Except, that is, when it comes to the mysterious specter who appears to be haunting the Smutny clan."

Keith Phipps of Vulture gave the episode a 4 star rating out of 5 and wrote, "This season is about a struggle between Josto and Loy, sure, but all these other elements keep getting into the mix, like Gaetano and Oraetta and the gun-toting Bonnie-and-Bonnie pair of Zelmare and Swanee. There's always an X-factor throwing off the balance. It's never just about two sides clashing." Nick Harley of Den of Geek gave the episode a 3.5 star rating out of 5 and wrote, "A war may be brewing, and comeuppances are bound to occur, but they don't happen here. 'A Pretend War' mainly sets the table for larger conflict ahead. Some of the moving parts still seem out of place from the rest of the proceedings, and the waxing about America has grown more than tired, but Fargo is building tension effectively. Now to see whether the fireworks will be worth the wait." Scott Tobias of The New York Times wrote, "This is the type of pulp entertainment Fargo does well, and the director of the episode, Dearbhla Walsh, keeps the camera active as the stakes are raised. Walsh pushes in on characters as they face consequential decisions but leaves the tension to dangle. It's the first episode this season to make you want to barrel through to the next one."
