= The Birthplace of Civilization =

- Fargo episode
- Episode no.: Season 4 Episode 5
- Directed by: Dana Gonzales
- Written by: Noah Hawley; Francesca Sloane
- Cinematography by: Pete Konczal
- Editing by: Regis Kimble
- Production code: XFO04005
- Original air date: October 18, 2020
- Running time: 60 minutes

Guest appearances
- Glynn Turman as Doctor Senator; Timothy Olyphant as Dick "Deafy" Wickware; Kelsey Asbille as Swanee Capps; Sean Fortunato as Antoon Dumini; Kai Lennox as Mort Kellerman

Episode chronology
← Previous "The Pretend War"	Next → "Camp Elegance"
- Fargo (season 4)

"The Birthplace of Civilization" is the fifth episode of the fourth season of the American anthology black comedy–crime drama television series Fargo. It is the 35th overall episode of the series and was written by series creator Noah Hawley and producer Francesca Sloane and directed by Dana Gonzales. It originally aired on FX on October 18, 2020.

The season is set in Kansas City, Missouri from November 1950 to early 1951, and follows two crime syndicates as they vie for control of the underground. One of these is Loy Cannon, the head of a crime syndicate made up of black migrants fleeing the Jim Crow South who have a contentious relationship with the Italian Kansas City mafia. In the episode, the mob war between the Cannon Limited and the Fadda Family escalates, while Deafy is closing in on Zelmare and Swanee.

According to Nielsen Media Research, the episode was seen by an estimated 0.74 million household viewers and gained a 0.2 ratings share among adults aged 18–49. The episode received mostly positive reviews from critics, who praised the ending and character development, although some still expressed criticism for the pacing and writing.

== Plot ==
Police officers led by Odis (Jack Huston) raid a jazz club and violently arrest many Cannon Limited members, including Lemuel (Matthew Elam). Josto (Jason Schwartzman), Gaetano (Salvatore Esposito) and other Fadda henchmen watch from the street, with Josto taking credit for the events.

After selling weapons and forming a partnership with Mort Kellerman (Kai Lennox), Loy (Chris Rock) and his henchmen are also intercepted by Odis, who wants to arrest them. Loy humiliates Odis by revealing his World War II history and how he developed his obsessive–compulsive disorder, prompting him to simply leave with Loy's money bag. Meanwhile, Ethelrida (E'myri Crutchfield) writes a letter to Dr. Harvard (Stephen Spencer) about all the patients that Oraetta (Jessie Buckley) has killed, after confirming with Thurman (Andrew Bird) about the medication she found at her closet.

Loy visits Thurman and Dibrell (Anji White), confronting them about the money and suspecting they committed the robbery. He then takes over their funeral home, which he will use as a front, as well as getting the location of Zelmare (Karen Aldridge) and Swanee (Kelsey Asbille). Deafy (Timothy Olyphant) questions Ethelrida at school, demanding to know Zelmare's location. Threatened with expulsion, she reveals she is hiding at the motel. There, Loy and his henchmen arrive at their room, intending to force them to work for him to cover their losses. Deafy arrives at the motel but is too late to catch them, seeing them leave with Loy in his car.

Doctor Senator (Glynn Turman) arrives at a diner for a meeting with Ebal Violante, but is surprised to see Calamita (Gaetano Bruno) and Gaetano instead. Calamita intimidates him by claiming that as he grew up an orphan, he is very dangerous. Senator is not intimidated by his comments, deeming them "boys making a mess that one day I'm gonna have to clean up" before leaving. Calamita follows him outside, killing Senator and his driver. That night, Loy and his men find the bodies and leave just as police sirens are heard.

== Production ==
=== Development ===
In September 2020, it was reported that the fifth episode of the season would be titled "The Birthplace of Civilization", and was to be written by series creator Noah Hawley and producer Francesca Sloane, and directed by Dana Gonzales. This was Hawley's 28th writing credit, Sloane's first writing credit, and Gonzales' first directing credit.

== Reception ==
=== Viewers ===
In its original American broadcast, "The Birthplace of Civilization" was seen by an estimated 0.74 million household viewers and gained a 0.2 ratings share among adults aged 18–49, according to Nielsen Media Research. This means that 0.2 percent of all households with televisions watched the episode. This was a slight decrease in viewership from the previous episode, which was watched by 0.76 million viewers with a 0.1 in the 18-49 demographics.

=== Critical reviews ===
"The Birthplace of Civilization" received mostly positive reviews from critics. Zack Handlen of The A.V. Club gave the episode a "B+" grade and wrote, "While 'The Birthplace Of Civilization' has its share of strong scenes and striking visuals, there's an airiness to it, an emptiness, that keeps preventing those individual scenes from connecting together in any but the most intellectual way. This week's theme is a bit more clearly stated than usual, and it's not bad, and there are some moments of suspense. But every time it seems like momentum is being built, every time it seems like the series might shift into a higher gear, there's a hitch or some character beat that doesn't quite land to keep it from making that transition."

Alan Sepinwall of Rolling Stone wrote, "It's another chaotic episode — so much that one can hardly blame Rabbi Milligan for wanting to take Satchel with him and disappear into the night if things get much worse — as the Faddas, the Cannons, and the cops all make moves against one another, with the Smutny clan somehow caught in the middle of it all." Nick Schager of Entertainment Weekly wrote, "In the underworld, there are no half-measures — once you're in, you're in all the way. That's a lesson learned by more than one character in Fargo's fifth episode, 'The Birthplace of Civilization', which moves its opposing clans ever closer to war."

Keith Phipps of Vulture gave the episode a 4 star rating out of 5 and wrote, "But where it's possible to imagine the average Kansas City resident going through day-to-day life without encountering any of the crime and weirdness we'd seen prior to this episode, 'The Birthplace of Civilization' seems like a tipping point, the moment when the bloodshed starts to spill into the streets and the sub-rosa conflict between warring gangland factions becomes impossible to hide." Nick Harley of Den of Geek gave the episode a 3.5 star rating out of 5 and wrote, "While Fargo shows bright spots, it's constantly weighed down by endless gabbing. However, while the series is going to miss Glynn Turman's Doctor Senator, his death could be the fuel that ignites a full-on explosion of action. Loy may have lost his righthand man, but he now has two wild cards at his disposal. And Gaetano helped strike back against his family's enemies, but it's likely to cause more strife between the Fadda brothers. There's good and bad all across the board, onscreen and in quality too." Scott Tobias of The New York Times wrote, "The death of Doctor Senator is, nonetheless, a big shock, because there was never a moment when he didn't seem entirely confident in his actions. Perhaps the real lesson from his Nuremberg story was that he should never feel that he is in control, even when he has successfully gotten the goods from a Nazi war criminal."

=== Accolades ===
TVLine named Glynn Turman as an honorable mention as the "Performer of the Week" for the week of October 24, 2020, for his performance in the episode. The site wrote, "Fargo is, if nothing else, a treasure trove of adorably odd character names, and Glynn Turman's Doctor Senator has been a bright spot in Season 4, acting as Loy Cannon's level-headed advisor. The veteran actor brings a wise, regal air to Doctor Senator, who flexes his intellect as he launches into monologues about the ways of the world. This week, Senator faced off against a pair of violent Italian mobsters, but Turman's face didn't betray even a flicker of fear as Senator calmly pointed out their logical fallacies and referred to the pair as 'just boys makin' a mess that one day I'm gonna have to clean up.' Senator didn't survive his run-in with the Italians, alas, and he even seemed to know his number was up — but the legacy of Turman's precisely calibrated turn will linger over the rest of this season, we're betting."
