= Fargo season 4 =

2020 season of American crime anthology TV series

Fargo
- Season 4
- Promotional poster
- Starring: Chris Rock; Jessie Buckley; Jason Schwartzman; Ben Whishaw; Jack Huston; Salvatore Esposito; E'myri Crutchfield; Andrew Bird; Anji White; Jeremie Harris; Matthew Elam; Corey Hendrix; James Vincent Meredith; Francesco Acquaroli; Gaetano Bruno; Stephen Spencer; Karen Aldridge
- No. of episodes: 11

Release
- Original network: FX
- Original release: September 27 – November 29, 2020

Season chronology
- ← Previous; Season 3 Next → Season 5

The fourth season of the American black comedy crime drama television series Fargo, billed as Fargo: Year Four and Fargo: Installment 4, aired on FX from September 27 to November 29, 2020, totaling eleven episodes. The series is an anthology about violent crime in the American Midwest, with each season acting as a self-contained story within the show's shared continuity. Set in Kansas City, Missouri from November 1950 to early 1951, the story details the rivalry between a crime syndicate made up of African American migrants fleeing the Jim Crow South, and the Italian Kansas City Mafia, as they both vie for control of the city's criminal underground.

The season was produced by FX Productions and MGM Television, with Noah Hawley serving as showrunner. It was originally scheduled to premiere on April 19, 2020, but was postponed due to the COVID-19 pandemic. Year 4 stars the largest ensemble cast of the series, featuring Chris Rock, Jessie Buckley, Jason Schwartzman, Ben Whishaw, Jack Huston, Salvatore Esposito, E'myri Crutchfield, Andrew Bird, Anji White, Jeremie Harris, Matthew Elam, Corey Hendrix, James Vincent Meredith, Francesco Acquaroli, Gaetano Bruno, Stephen Spencer, and Karen Aldridge.

Fargo: Year Four was generally well-received by critics, who praised its themes of immigration and culture, as well as its production values and performances. However, many saw it as a step down from the previous seasons, citing its inconsistent pacing and overabundance of characters.

== Cast ==
=== Main ===
- Chris Rock as Loy Cannon, the leader of the African-American crime syndicate Cannon Limited, as well as a businessman trying to get his new idea, the credit card, off the ground.
- Jessie Buckley as Oraetta Mayflower, a deceptively cheerful nurse and angel of mercy.
- Jason Schwartzman as Josto Fadda, the physically unimposing and impulsive leader of the Sardinian Fadda family.
- Ben Whishaw as Patrick "Rabbi" Milligan, an Irish-American member of the Fadda family.
- Jack Huston as Odis Weff, a cop with many nervous tics who served in World War II and is secretly on the Faddas' payroll.
- Salvatore Esposito as Gaetano Fadda, Josto's younger but larger brother, a violent and unblinking man from Italy.
- E'myri Crutchfield as Ethelrida Pearl Smutny, an intelligent and rebellious African-American teen.
- Andrew Bird as Thurman Smutny, Ethelrida's father, the owner of a funeral home.
- Anji White as Dibrell Smutny, Ethelrida's stern, protective mother.
- Jeremie Harris as Leon Bittle, a young and ambitious member of the Cannon Limited.
- Matthew Elam as Lemuel Cannon, Loy's elder son.
- Corey Hendrix as Omie Sparkman, a former boxer and a member of the Cannon Limited.
- James Vincent Meredith as Opal Rackley, a member of the Cannon Limited.
- Francesco Acquaroli as Ebal Violante, consigliere of the Fadda family.
- Gaetano Bruno as Constant Calamita, a hitman for the Fadda family.
- Stephen Spencer as Dr. David Harvard, the prejudiced head of a top private hospital in Kansas City.
- Karen Aldridge as Zelmare Roulette, Dibrell's sister, Ethelrida's maternal aunt, and a bank robber.

=== Recurring ===
- Glynn Turman as Doctor Senator, consigliere of the Cannon Limited.
- Timothy Olyphant as Dick "Deafy" Wickware, a Mormon U.S. Marshal who has arrived in Kansas City to hunt Zelmare and Swanee.
- Kelsey Asbille as Swanee Capps, Zelmare Roulette's lover and partner in crime.
- J. Nicole Brooks as Buel Cannon, Loy's wife.
- Rodney L. Jones III as Michael "Satchel" Cannon, Loy's younger son who is traded to the Faddas and looked after by Rabbi Milligan. He grows up to become Mike Milligan in the second season.
- Nadia Simms as Pessimindle Cannon, Loy's daughter.
- Hannah Love Jones as Florine Cannon, Loy's daughter.
- Tommaso Ragno as Donatello Fadda, Josto and Gaetano's father and the head of the Fadda family.
- Torrey Hanson as Principal Rice Crisco, Ethelrida's cruel principal.
- Will Clinger as Theodore "Mr. Snowman" Roach, the spirit of a slave owner that haunts the Smutnys.
- Cruz Gonzalez-Cadel as Naneeda Fadda, Donatello's daughter.
- Sean Fortunato as Antoon Dumini, a member of the Fadda family and Naneeda's husband.
- Evan Mulrooney as Joe Bulo, a New York based mafia soldier who assists the Faddas in their war; Brad Garrett originally portrayed the character in season 2.

=== Guests ===
- Bokeem Woodbine and Brad Mann reprise their respective roles as Mike Milligan and Gale Kitchen in a cameo appearance in the season finale.

== Episodes ==
No. overall	No. in season	Title	Directed by	Written by	Original release date	Prod. code	U.S. viewers (millions)
31	1	"Welcome to the Alternate Economy"	Noah Hawley	Noah Hawley	September 27, 2020	XFO04001	1.22
In 1920 Kansas City, Missouri, the bosses of a Jewish crime organization, the Moskowitz Syndicate, and an Irish gang, the Milligan Concern, trade their youngest sons to keep the peace. However, Milligan's son, Patrick, betrays his adoptive family, allowing the Irish to ambush and wipe out the Syndicate, with Patrick's father forcing him to personally execute Moskowitz's son. In 1934, the Milligan Concern and the newly arrived Sardinian Fadda Family go through the same peace offering, with Patrick Milligan again being exchanged. This time, Patrick betrays his Irish family and they are destroyed in a similar ambush by the Faddas. Patrick is forced to execute his father. In 1949, an African American gang, the Cannon Limited, come to power, and leader Loy Cannon trades sons with the Fadda Family. Loy's youngest son, Satchel, is exchanged for Don Donatello Fadda's youngest son, Zero. Patrick, who is now nicknamed "Rabbi," empathetically promises Loy that he will personally look out for Satchel. One year later, while at a stop sign, Donatello Fadda is accidentally shot in the jugular by children with a BB gun, and is rushed to the city's top private hospital. The hospital director, Dr. Harvard, is prejudiced against Italians and demands that they leave. Donatello's son, Josto, swears revenge. At a lesser-quality public hospital, Josto bonds briefly with Donatello's nurse, Oraetta Mayflower. Later that afternoon, Mayflower kills Donatello with a morphine injection and steals his ring. Meanwhile, bright and rebellious mixed-race teenager Ethelrida Pearl Smutny, whose parents run a funeral home, has a conversation with her father Thurman about their financial problems. For unknown reasons, Thurman has accepted a large loan from Loy which he is unable to repay. Unknown to them, Mayflower is watching them from her apartment across the street, and has taken a peculiar interest in Ethelrida.
32	2	"The Land of Taking and Killing"	Noah Hawley	Noah Hawley	September 27, 2020	XFO04002	0.79
Bank robbers Zelmare Roulette (Ethelrida's aunt) and Swanee Capps escape prison and arrive unannounced at the Smutny house. Ethelrida's mother, Dibrell, reluctantly allows her sister and Swanee to stay. Josto, who has now assumed control of the Fadda Family, finds his legitimacy challenged by his younger brother, Gaetano Fadda, who refuses to go back to Sardinia following Donatello's funeral and immediately begins undermining his brother's authority. Further adding to his weak appearance, some of Josto's men botch a drive-by hit on Dr. Harvard, instead killing a nurse and a wealthy socialite. Odis Weff, a corrupt cop working for Josto who has numerous nervous tics, warns him to refrain from bringing any more heat on the Family. Meanwhile, the Cannon Limited decides to take advantage of Donatello's death. Before he died, Donatello was considering handing over a front disguised as a slaughterhouse to Loy. Loy and his consigliere, Doctor Senator, make a move to seize the slaughterhouse, claiming the deal had been settled. However, Gaetano then arrives at the slaughterhouse instead of Josto and tells Senator that if he finds the deal was illegitimate, there will be retaliation. Striking up conversation on their porch, Oraetta is impressed with Ethelrida's intelligence. That night, Oraetta bakes her an apple pie, but laces it with ipecac. She leaves the dessert on the Smutnys' front porch and Thurman brings it inside. A police squad suddenly raids the house, looking for Zelmare and Swanee.
33	3	"Raddoppiarlo"	Dearbhla Walsh	Noah Hawley	October 4, 2020	XFO04003	0.72
U.S. Marshal Dick "Deafy" Wickware, who has been trailing Zelmare and Swanee since their escape, arrives in Kansas City and is assigned Odis as his guide. The two lead the raid on the Smutny funeral home. Deafy questions Dibrell on the whereabouts of her sister and Swanee, but Dibrell and Ethelrida both claim they have not seen or heard from them. A search of the house and the morgue in the basement yields no results, and the police leave. Zelmare and Swanee, who hid in one of the morgue's cold lockers, promise to leave, but take Thurman's shotgun with them. Thurman smuggles them out in a casket and drops them off at their destination, not knowing that it is Loy's compound. The duo kill three of Loy's henchmen and steal $20,000. Swanee, who had eaten a piece of Oraetta's poisoned pie, becomes violently ill and vomits on the money, forcing the two to make a hasty getaway. Oraetta is fired for the unusual number of patients who have died under her care, but manages to get a new job at Dr. Harvard's hospital. Noticing Josto in his car outside the hospital, she assumes he is following her for romantic reasons, and she gives him a line of cocaine and a handjob. Gaetano grows impatient with Josto's diplomatic approach to the Cannons and begins rallying some of the Family to his side, including hitman Constant Calamita. He instructs Calamita to carry out a drive-by hit on Loy's eldest son, Lemuel, having Rabbi act as the triggerman. Rabbi, suspecting Josto did not authorize the hit, foils the attempt. Loy, confronted with the news of the robbery and the failed hit, believes Josto is behind both and wants retaliation. Doctor Senator, suspecting something is off, convinces Loy to let him investigate the situation before declaring war.
34	4	"The Pretend War"	Dearbhla Walsh	Noah Hawley and Stefani Robinson	October 11, 2020	XFO04004	0.76
While smuggling a large quantity of rifles in a produce truck, Calamita and his driver are stopped by Loy's gang using a flaming roadblock. They kill the driver and brand Calamita's face before stealing the truck. Loy sells the guns to Mort Kellerman and the Fargo Mafia at cost, reserving a favor from them in the event that they are needed during a war with the Faddas. During a sitdown with Fadda consigliere Ebal Violante, Doctor Senator claims the heist was retaliation for the attempted hit on Lemuel. Violante's confusion confirms Senator's suspicions that the attack was a power move from Gaetano and the robbery was just a random crime. Rabbi informs Josto of Gaetano's efforts to undermine him. Enraged, Josto confronts Gaetano in front of his followers, threatening to shoot him in the genitals. Gaetano backs off, but is visibly angered. Oraetta, who has begun an intense sexual relationship with Josto, gets interrupted by Ethelrida, who has arrived at her apartment looking for a part-time housecleaning job. While alone in the apartment, Ethelrida discovers Oraetta's secret closet where she keeps various poisons, mementos from her victims, and newspaper clippings about her killings. Ethelrida steals one of the clippings and Donatello's ring. She leaves in a hurry and forgets her notebook in the closet. Zelmare meets with Thurman, giving him a bag full of her recently stolen money so he can pay his debt to Loy. Thurman, unaware that the money was originally Loy's, arrives at the latter's house, pays his debt, and leaves. Loy is momentarily happy that something went his way, but becomes angry when he notices the vomit smell of the money and realizes what has happened.
35	5	"The Birthplace of Civilization"	Dana Gonzales	Noah Hawley and Francesca Sloane	October 18, 2020	XFO04005	0.74
Ethelrida writes an anonymous letter to Dr. Harvard detailing her findings about the many deaths of Oraetta's patients. In retaliation for the truck heist, Josto has Odis arrest several Cannon Limited men, including Lemuel. When Odis attempts to arrest Loy, he takes advantage of Odis' OCD and turns the tables on him. Odis instead confiscates the bag of money Thurman gave Loy. Loy confronts Thurman, demanding Zelmare's location and assuming control of the funeral home for use as a front. Simultaneously, Deafy interrogates Ethelrida at her school for the same information. Both Loy and Deafy head to the hotel Zelmare and Swanee are hiding out in. Loy gets there first, but rather than kill the pair, he sneaks them out of the hotel, wanting to make use of their skills. Doctor Senator arrives at the diner he and Violante regularly have meetings at, but is surprised to find Gaetano and Calamita there instead. They attempt to threaten Senator, but he rebukes the pair and leaves. Calamita follows Senator outside the diner and shoots him dead in the street.
36	6	"Camp Elegance"	Dana Gonzales	Noah Hawley and Enzo Mileti & Scott Wilson and Francesca Sloane	October 25, 2020	XFO04011	0.70
Loy and his gang ambush Odis in his apartment and force him to flip sides. With his help, Zelmare and Swanee shoot their way into Gaetano's compound, and they subdue him and bring him to Loy, who has him tortured. Dr. Harvard brings Ethelrida's letter to Oraetta's attention. She manages to talk her way out of his suspicions, but he refuses her request to let her see the letter. Violante returns from New York City with Joe Bulo after requesting backup. New York promises to help Josto, but only if he can fix his problem with Cannon Limited within two weeks and makes peace with Gaetano. Violante suggests an exchange with Cannon Limited to get Gaetano back. However, Josto secretly orders his brother-in-law, Antoon Dumini, to kill Satchel, expecting that Loy will in turn kill Gaetano. Rabbi deduces Josto's plan and kills Antoon before he can execute Satchel, and the two go on the run.
37	7	"Lay Away"	Dana Gonzales	Noah Hawley and Enzo Mileti & Scott Wilson	November 1, 2020	XFO04006	0.65
Oraetta feeds Dr. Harvard poisoned macaroons. As he writhes in agony, she steals Ethelrida's letter from his desk. The Faddas discover Antoon's body and surmise that Rabbi has betrayed them. Josto dispatches Calamita to track down Rabbi and Satchel. Violante intends to hand over several Fadda businesses in exchange for Gaetano, but Josto sabotages the exchange, lying to Loy that Calamita, enraged at Gaetano's abduction, killed Satchel. He instead offers Violante's promised businesses in exchange for Loy killing Gaetano and Calamita. After mourning overnight and toying with the idea of killing Zero in retaliation, Loy sees the big picture and realizes Josto is setting him up. Instead of killing Gaetano, Loy informs him of his brother's betrayal and sets him free. Loy then sends Omie Sparkman to kill Calamita.
38	8	"The Nadir"	Sylvain White	Noah Hawley and Enzo Mileti & Scott Wilson	November 8, 2020	XFO04007	0.70
Oraetta receives news that Dr. Harvard has survived his poisoning and is expected to make a full recovery. Hastily packing her bags, she finds Ethelrida's notebook in her apartment. Comparing its handwriting to the letter she pulled from Harvard's desk, she deduces that Ethelrida wrote the letter. Josto arrives at his compound and is horrified to find Gaetano there. Gaetano beats him, but then professes his admiration for Josto's attempt to have him killed and pledges his loyalty to his brother, finally accepting his leadership. Learning his plan has backfired and united the brothers against him, Loy calls in his favor from the Fargo Mafia. Deafy confronts Loy, demanding the whereabouts of Zelmare and Swanee. Loy initially resists out of obligation to his sense of honor, but Deafy mocks his code and ultimately intimidates Loy into revealing that the duo will be taking the 10pm train to Philadelphia. Deafy assembles a squad to arrest the pair. Odis, claiming to want a return to his life as a cop and be a crook no longer, accompanies the raid, but is incapacitated by his OCD when it commences. Zelmare and Swanee make a last stand, killing many cops and civilians alike. Odis finally works up the courage to enter the station, and finds Deafy just as he has cornered the outlaws. Still acting under orders from Loy, he shoots Deafy dead. He then turns his gun on the women, killing Swanee. An enraged Zelmare manages to push past Odis and escape. While visiting their mother's house, Josto and Gaetano are ambushed by Mort Kellerman and his Fargo soldiers. Gaetano manages to singlehandedly push them back, but the brothers are devastated to learn that their mother was killed in the crossfire.
39	9	"East/West"	Michael Uppendahl	Noah Hawley and Lee Edward Colston II	November 15, 2020	XFO04008	0.82
The episode is presented in black and white and told through the eyes of Omie Sparkman, Rabbi Milligan, and Satchel Cannon. Omie is traveling with Aldo, a kidnapped Fadda henchman who has tipped him off that Calamita is pursuing Rabbi and Satchel to Liberal, Kansas. At a gas station outside the city, Omie tells the owner he is expecting someone, and offers to finish painting the building if he can stay and wait. When Calamita shows up, Aldo tries to flee and Omie kills him, alerting Calamita. One day prior, Rabbi and Satchel arrive at an unusual boarding house in Liberal. Satchel finds a seemingly abandoned terrier named Rabbit in their room and adopts it, while Rabbi unsuccessfully scrounges for cash. After a day and a half, Rabbi decides they need to leave, declining Satchel's request that they bring Rabbit along. Upset, Satchel tells Rabbi it is his birthday and he was hoping to get a gift. Feeling guilty, Rabbi leaves to look for a candy bar for Satchel. As a storm builds, Rabbi travels to the gas station. There, he discovers the owner has been killed and finds that Calamita has wounded and cornered Omie. A gunfight ensues, which is interrupted when a sudden tornado sucks up the station, killing Rabbi, Calamita, and Omie. The next morning, Satchel wakes up to discover that Rabbi has not returned. Armed with Rabbi's gun, he leaves the boarding house with Rabbit and begins walking down the road.
40	10	"Happy"	Sylvain White	Noah Hawley	November 22, 2020	XF004009	0.81
The Cannon Limited and the Fadda Family commit to war. Several months pass, and by 1951 the violence has gotten out of control. Trying to reclaim his life, Odis arrests Josto, Gaetano, and several others. Loy, who is losing the war, seeks aid from his brother-in-law, the rural mobster Happy. But Happy and Leon quickly betray Loy, making a deal with Josto to kill Loy and run the Cannon Limited under the Faddas. Odis arrives at his apartment to find it ransacked. He tries to flee, but Josto and Gaetano corner him in his car. Unable to defend himself, he accepts his fate and Gaetano shoots him dead. As Gaetano runs away from Odis' car, he trips and falls, accidentally discharging his gun and killing himself. Josto flees the scene. Oraetta, intending to kill Ethelrida and get back Donatello's ring, sneaks into her bedroom, but the ghost of Theodore Roach appears and scares her off. She returns home to find the police waiting to arrest her based on Dr. Harvard's testimony. Ethelrida arranges a meeting with Loy to make a deal for her family's business. She presents him with Donatello's ring and evidence that he was murdered by Oraetta, claiming it will help him win his war with the Faddas.
41	11	"Storia Americana"	Dana Gonzales	Noah Hawley	November 29, 2020	XFO04010	0.85
Following his meeting with Ethelrida, Loy gives the Smutnys their funeral home back. Josto, drunk after Gaetano's death, vengefully murders his fiancée's father, Milvin Gillis, and a recovered Dr. Harvard. Loy meets with Violante and returns both the elder Fadda's ring and Zero. The two make a deal to end the war. Loy then has Happy and Leon killed for their betrayals. A hungover Josto is confronted in a kangaroo court by Violante and the rest of the Fadda operation, who assert that Josto has acted outside the interests of the family. Oraetta, who has been bailed out of jail by Violante, claims Josto indirectly ordered her to murder Donatello, and testifies about her and Josto's relationship after. Taking into account how Oraetta had Donatello's ring as well as Gaetano's unexplained death, Violante concludes Josto conspired with Oraetta to kill his father and brother for more power, and declares that the Faddas' days as a family business are over. With New York's blessing, Violante takes control of the entire operation, which he intends to modernize. Joe Bulo drives Josto and Oraetta to a field and executes them both. Loy returns home with his family and is overjoyed to discover Satchel has made his way back. With the war ended, Loy is shocked to discover that Violante has made "small adjustments" to their peace deal; half of the Cannon Limited's business will be under Italian control. Defeated, Loy returns home, but finds bliss with his family reunited. Lingering outside the front door as he joyfully watches them through a window, he is suddenly stabbed by a vengeful Zelmare. Satchel witnesses the attack and goes to his father's side as he dies. The episode ends with Ethelrida reciting her American history report to her proud parents. During the credits, it is revealed that Satchel grows up to become Mike Milligan, a player in Violante's new, more corporate Kansas City Mafia.

== Production ==
The fourth season was announced in August 2018 and it was confirmed that Chris Rock was cast in the lead role. In July 2019, 12 actors were announced to have been cast, including Francesco Acquaroli, Andrew Bird, Jessie Buckley, Salvatore Esposito, Jeremie Harris, Jack Huston, Amber Midthunder, Jason Schwartzman, and Ben Whishaw. Midthunder ultimately did not appear and her role was recast with Kelsey Asbille for undisclosed reasons. Uzo Aduba was originally cast as Zelmare Roulette, but dropped out of the role due to "some personal family issues". The role was recast with Karen Aldridge in December.

Production began in October 2019 in Chicago, Illinois, with Hawley directing the first block of episodes. In March 2020, FX suspended production on the series for at least two weeks due to the COVID-19 pandemic. The original premiere date of April 19, 2020, was also pushed back due to production delays. The series completed production on eight of the eleven episodes before production shut down. Production resumed in August 2020 and was completed by September 8, 2020.

== Reception ==
=== Critical response ===
The fourth season has received generally positive reviews from critics, though less acclaimed than previous seasons. On Rotten Tomatoes, the season has an 84% approval rating based on 58 critics' reviews, with an average score of 7.3/10. The website's critical consensus is: "Though Fargo's ambitious fourth season struggles to maintain momentum, fine performances and a change of scenery make for an engaging – if uneven – departure from the series' norm." On Metacritic, the season has a weighted average score of 68 out of 100 based on 37 reviews, indicating "generally favorable" reviews.

Matt Zoller Seitz, writing for Vulture, gave the season a negative review. He criticized the writers' missed opportunity to link the season's unique premise of children swapping among gangs to its themes of immigration and culture, as well as their tendency to make subtext obvious through excessive monologues.

=== Accolades ===
For the 11th Critics' Choice Television Awards, Chris Rock received a nomination for Best Actor in a Limited Series and Glynn Turman received a nomination for Best Supporting Actor in a Limited Series.
