= Happy (Fargo) =

- Fargo episode
- Episode no.: Season 4 Episode 10
- Directed by: Sylvain White
- Written by: Noah Hawley
- Cinematography by: Pete Konczal
- Editing by: Regis Kimble
- Production code: XFO04009
- Original air date: November 22, 2020
- Running time: 53 minutes

Guest appearances
- Timothy Olyphant as Dick "Deafy" Wickware; Edwin Lee Gibson as Lionel "Happy" Halloway; Guy Van Swearingen as Captain Martin Hanhuck; J. Nicole Brooks as Buel Cannon; Rodney L. Jones II as Satchel Cannon

Episode chronology
← Previous "East/West"	Next → "Storia Americana"
- Fargo (season 4)

"Happy" is the tenth episode of the fourth season of the American anthology black comedy–crime drama television series Fargo. It is the 40th overall episode of the series and was written by series creator Noah Hawley and directed by Sylvain White. It originally aired on FX on November 22, 2020.

The season is set in Kansas City, Missouri from November 1950 to early 1951, and follows two crime syndicates as they vie for control of the underground. One of these is Loy Cannon, the head of a crime syndicate made up of black migrants fleeing the Jim Crow South who have a contentious relationship with the Italian Kansas City mafia. In the episode, Odis arrests Josto and Gaetano, putting him as a target by the Fadda Family, while Loy asks a family member for help as he is losing the war.

According to Nielsen Media Research, the episode was seen by an estimated 0.81 million household viewers and gained a 0.2 ratings share among adults aged 18–49. The episode received mostly positive reviews from critics, who praised the twists, character development and performances, although some questioned if it was too late for the season to recover from previous mistakes.

== Plot ==
As months pass in 1951, the war between Cannon Limited and the Fadda Family escalates, resulting in many deaths. Hoping to rehabilitate himself, Odis (Jack Huston) arrests Josto (Jason Schwartzman), Gaetano (Salvatore Esposito) and some of his henchmen.

Loy (Chris Rock) meets with his brother-in-law, the rural mobster Lionel "Happy" Halloway. Happy is reluctant to help due to Loy previously beating Leon Bittle (Jeremie Harris) but agrees to cooperate after learning of Satchel's supposed murder. Josto attempts to blackmail Odis, but Odis is not alarmed in the slightest. With New York putting pressure in ending the war, Josto decides to orchestrate a scheme where he can get Loy killed. While talking with Dibrell (Anji White), Ethelrida (E'myri Crutchfield) learns that the ghost of a slave owner named Theodore Roach has pursued Zelmare, but now seems interested in Ethelrida. She is also confronted by Oraetta (Jessie Buckley) about the stolen ring but threatens to call the police on the evidence she found.

Josto convinces Happy and Leon to betray Loy, promising to make them the new bosses of the Cannon Limited. Loy learns of this and ponders how he must respond, feeling lost as the war is not on his favor. That night, Odis arrives at his apartment to find it ransacked. He tries to flee, but Josto and Gaetano corner him in his car. With nowhere to go and struggling with his OCD, Odis accepts his fate, allowing Gaetano to kill him by a gunshot. As Gaetano leaves his car, he trips and accidentally discharges the gun through his head, killing himself and forcing Josto to flee the scene. Meanwhile, Satchel (Rodney L. Jones II) keeps traveling on the road with his dog, Rabbit, threatening two men in a car who insult him.

Oraetta enters the Smutny residence, intending to kill a sleeping Ethelrida with a syringe. However, she is shocked when the ghost of Theodore Roach appears, scaring her and forcing her to go back to her house. There, police officers have arrived to arrest her for poisoning Dr. Harvard. Ethelrida meets with Loy, claiming she can help end the war if her family debt is settled. After commenting on the painting in his office, a copy of Summary Execution under the Moorish Kings of Granada by Henri Regnault, she gives him Donatello's ring, along with evidence of Oraetta's killing.

== Production ==
=== Development ===
In October 2020, it was reported that the tenth episode of the season would be titled "Happy", and was to be written by series creator Noah Hawley and directed by Sylvain White. This was Hawley's 33rd writing credit, and White's second directing credit.

=== Writing ===
Regarding Gaetano's death, Noah Hawley said, "I wanted it like the death of the state trooper in Fargo: It's shocking because it happens so quickly and it's gory, it's graphic, and seems a bit over-the-top, so it becomes what violence actually is, which is overwhelming in the moment."

=== Filming ===
Originally, Hawley planned to cut the scenes that showed Satchel walking on the road, planning to incorporate them in the season finale. He was convinced by FX to keep the footage, as it was important to show Satchel's journey.

== Reception ==
=== Viewers ===
In its original American broadcast, "Happy" was seen by an estimated 0.81 million household viewers and gained a 0.2 ratings share among adults aged 18–49, according to Nielsen Media Research. This means that 0.2 percent of all households with televisions watched the episode. This was a slight decrease in viewership from the previous episode, which was watched by 0.82 million viewers with a 0.1 in the 18-49 demographics.

=== Critical reviews ===
"Happy" received mostly positive reviews from critics. Zack Handlen of The A.V. Club gave the episode an "A-" grade and wrote, "After a certain point, you have to accept that no story turn could completely make up for all that came before it. Fargo's fourth season passed that point an episode or two ago, which makes 'Happy', maybe the best entry of the season so far, somewhat bittersweet."

Alan Sepinwall of Rolling Stone wrote, "'Happy' isn't the artistic triumph that 'East/West' was. But in crossing back over the Kansas/Missouri border and catching up with all our surviving characters — a few of whom didn't maintain that distinction for long — this latest chapter makes the season's various feuds and character pairings feel more vital and interesting than most of them have since early on." Nick Schager of Entertainment Weekly wrote, "War has finally broken out in Kansas City between Josto's Italian crime clan and Loy's gangster family. That means everyone is now in immediate danger, although by the end of 'Happy' — the season's penultimate installment — a solution to the conflict materializes from the unlikeliest of sources."

Keith Phipps of Vulture gave the episode a 4 star rating out of 5 and wrote, "Here's a question: With Gaetano dead and Oraetta in handcuffs, has this season of Fargo taken the characters who've racked up the highest body counts off the board? Historically speaking, that is." Nick Harley of Den of Geek gave the episode a 3 star rating out of 5 and wrote, "Barreling through stories and racing to the finish, there isn't a ton to say about Fargo's finish. I feel dispassionate about the season overall, just because it's often felt like several different shows smashed together, just barely connected at the seams. There are often things to like in every episode, it just doesn't often feel a part of what's come before, in a way that's difficult to explain. Next week, Season 4 of Fargo will come to a close, but will Noah Hawley and company be able to wrap things together in some capacity that feels satisfying or whole?" Scott Tobias of The New York Times wrote, "The table is set for a finale stripped down to two major rivals, Loy and Josto, and a few others who might intervene. Will Happy's alignment with the Faddas backfire now that Loy knows about it and Gaetano is dead? What will happen when Zelmare inevitably returns to the scene? And after a tornado last week and the ghost of a slave ship captain this week, what crazy deus ex machina will wrap things up?"
