= Storia Americana =

- Fargo episode
- Episode no.: Season 4 Episode 11
- Directed by: Dana Gonzales
- Written by: Noah Hawley
- Cinematography by: Erik Messerschmidt
- Editing by: Curtis Thurber
- Production code: XFO04010
- Original air date: November 29, 2020
- Running time: 39 minutes

Guest appearances
- Bokeem Woodbine as Mike Milligan; Glynn Turman as Doctor Senator; Timothy Olyphant as Dick "Deafy" Wickware; J. Nicole Brooks as Buel Cannon; Edwin Lee Gibson as Lionel "Happy" Halloway; Rodney L. Jones II as Satchel Cannon; Tommaso Ragno as Donatello Fadda; Sean Fortunato as Antoon Dumini; Kelsey Asbille as Swanee Capps; Andrew Rothenberg as Liev Moskowitz

Episode chronology
← Previous "Happy"	Next → "The Tragedy of the Commons"
- Fargo (season 4)

"Storia Americana" is the eleventh episode and season finale of the fourth season of the American anthology black comedy–crime drama television series Fargo. It is the 41st overall episode of the series and was written by series creator Noah Hawley and directed by Dana Gonzales. It originally aired on FX on November 29, 2020.

The season is set in Kansas City, Missouri from November 1950 to early 1951, and follows two crime syndicates as they vie for control of the underground. One of these is Loy Cannon, the head of a crime syndicate made up of black migrants fleeing the Jim Crow South who have a contentious relationship with the Italian Kansas City mafia. In the episode, Loy makes a deal with Ebal Violante, in an attempt to finally end the mob war with the Fadda Family.

According to Nielsen Media Research, the episode was seen by an estimated 0.85 million household viewers and gained a 0.2 ratings share among adults aged 18–49. The episode received positive reviews from critics, who praised the performances and sense of closure, although some still felt that the season as a whole did not add to a cohesive narrative.

== Plot ==
While Loy (Chris Rock) meets with Ebal Violante (Francesco Acquaroli) to return Zero and Donatello's ring, Lemuel (Matthew Elam) moves out of the Smutny residence. A drunken Josto (Jason Schwartzman) intercepts Dr. Harvard (Stephen Spencer) and his fiancée's father, Milvin Gillis, killing them in a car and then burning it.

For their betrayals, Loy has Happy (Edwin Lee Gibson) and Leon (Jeremie Harris) executed by his henchmen. At his compound, Josto is confronted by the surviving Fadda family, and is surprised when he finds Oraetta (Jessie Buckley), who has been bailed out by Violante. Violante has convinced the family that Josto had Oraetta indirectly kill Donatello because of the ring, also blaming Josto for Gaetano's death. With this, Violante declares that he will take control of the family, deeming that the Faddas are no longer capable of handling business. He sends Joe Bulo to take Josto and Oraetta to a field and execute them both. Per Oraetta's request, Josto is killed first while Oraetta once again sees a ghost before being executed.

Loy returns home and is surprised to discover Satchel (Rodney L. Jones II) made his way home with his dog, Rabbit. Later, Loy meets with Violante, the war officially over. Despite their previous deal, Violante tells Loy he will have to give up half of the Cannon Limited's territory or face death, forcing Loy to accept it. He returns home defeated, although he is overjoyed to see his family reunited. Suddenly, Zelmare (Karen Aldridge) stabs Loy several times and escapes. Satchel witnesses the aftermath and stays with his father until he dies.

Ethelrida (E'myri Crutchfield) reads her history report to her proud parents, and then in a flashforward, gives it directly to the camera, seated in front of the Regnault painting that was in Loy's office. During the credits, a grown-up Satchel now goes by the name Mike Milligan (Bokeem Woodbine). As he is driven in a car by Gale Kitchen (Brad Mann) to meet with Ed Blumquist in Sioux Falls, he stares out the window, remembering his childhood and everything Rabbi taught him.

== Production ==
=== Development ===
In November 2020, it was reported that the eleventh and final episode of the season would be titled "Storia Americana", and was to be written by series creator Noah Hawley and directed by Dana Gonzales. This was Hawley's 34th writing credit, and Gonzales' fourth directing credit. Originally, the season would only consist of 10 episodes, but it was extended by one episode after Hawley claimed to have too much filmed material that could be expanded.

=== Writing ===
Loy's fate was decided after considering many options. Hawley felt it would not be possible that Loy would be behind bars, that he would be killed by his enemies or living happily with his family. He said, "he has this moment where he thinks maybe this is a happy ending and that the night comes, not because of anything other than that he as an individual betrayed another individual, and as we know from the Coen Brothers universe, the things we do catch up with us." The writers decided that Zelmare should be the one to kill him as an act of justice for her, as well as using the oranges as a callback to a previous episode. The death scene of Josto and Oraetta was made to make Josto see that "in the end he realized that he was her pawn, so it seems fitting."

The episode revealed that Satchel Cannon would grow on to become Mike Milligan, portrayed by Bokeem Woodbine in the second season, with Woodbine reprising his role in the final credits sequence. While FX intended for the reveal to be more secret, Hawley didn't view it as such, saying, "when you have a central character named Milligan, it doesn't seem like you're really fooling anyone, and you're talking about the trading of sons. So [a twist] was never my goal." Regarding what would happen after Loy's death, Hawley theorized that the Cannons would fall under hard times without money, forcing Satchel to enter the crime business with Rabbi's knowledge and changing his last name as it felt like it wasn't safe for him. He explained, "this story is an attempt to explain the origins of someone as unique as him, this idea that he's Cannon’s son, but he's raised by a second father who himself was raised by Irish and Jewish and Italian parents and on some level that's the history of America right there. It seemed like a way to this larger story, but then I think ultimately that the Mike Milligan origin story became just a component of a larger story."

There were many versions about the inclusion of Mike Milligan in the episode. One of these included Milligan in the 90s, and while the scene was filmed, it was discarded as Hawley felt having new scenes after the ending wouldn't make for a satisfying ending. The scene used in the final cut was intended to have dialogue, which was a common trait of Milligan. But Hawley decided that the audience needed to process everything that happened before it, so he scrapped the plan.

== Reception ==
=== Viewers ===
In its original American broadcast, "Storia Americana" was seen by an estimated 0.85 million household viewers and gained a 0.2 ratings share among adults aged 18–49, according to Nielsen Media Research. This means that 0.2 percent of all households with televisions watched the episode. This was a 4% decrease in viewership from the previous episode, which was watched by 0.81 million viewers with a 0.2 in the 18-49 demographics.

=== Critical reviews ===
"Storia Americana" received positive reviews from critics. Zack Handlen of The A.V. Club gave the episode a "B" grade and wrote, "Despite season four's large and sprawling ensemble, despite the seemingly endless collection of subplots and side missions, when it comes time to close the shop and head for home, Fargo seems to have run out of things to say. Of its less-than-40-minutes, 'Americana' finds time for a montage of the season's casualties, and several long, slow scenes full of swelling music of people looking at things. The plot is wrapped up, more or less, and most of the conclusions are definitive. One or two of them is even unexpected. But very little in this finale is surprising or edifying. It might clear the bar on 'satisfying', if all you really wanted were a few more corpses."

Alan Sepinwall of Rolling Stone wrote, "The anthological nature of Fargo means there's no real baggage for a hypothetical fifth season, which could still be excellent if Hawley has the right inspiration, and executes more strongly than he did here. TV is better when Fargo is great. Season Four unfortunately only offered periodic glimpses of what the show can be. Hawley doesn't need a new way; he just needs to figure out how to get the old way working like it did before." Nick Schager of Entertainment Weekly wrote, "The chickens come home to roost in Fargo's finale, bringing to a close a season of treachery and murder. If there's a lesson to be gleaned from the fourth installment of Noah Hawley's TV series, its that few criminals live long enough to retire — including Loy, who learns that the only thing worse than waging a gangland war is winning one."

Keith Phipps of Vulture gave the episode a 4 star rating out of 5 and wrote, "So good season, wasn't it, all in all? It felt overstuffed at times and the story sagged a bit in the middle, but it ended strongly. And if the warring gang narrative sometimes felt like an excuse to parade a bunch of compelling, eccentric characters through a richly realized world, well, there are worse ways to spend 11 episodes." Nick Harley of Den of Geek gave the episode a 3.5 star rating out of 5 and wrote, "While Season 4 was never exactly a chore, it did at times feel like a slog. Clearly, COVID impacted the production to some degree and perhaps there was material cut or left unfilmed that would have brought more unity to the story’s overarching themes. There's no way of knowing. What we do know is that perhaps its time for the Fargo brand to come to an end. This season in particular it felt like the dedication to the Coen aesthetic harmed the story more than helped it. Maybe the black comedy and anthology approach felt more novel in 2014 than in 2020. Season 4 seemed to think that an Easter Egg callback to its second season, a better story in every facet, was one of its most important, climactic moments. That should be enough of an indictment." Scott Tobias of The New York Times wrote, "From the start, this season posited itself as a story about American immigration and prejudice, about the alternative paths entire ethnic groups have had to take in order to gain legitimacy and how even those paths are limited for Black citizens. Ethelrida Smutny lays out those themes explicitly in the narration that opens and closes the season, every bit the good student with her thesis and concluding paragraphs. And yet, the body of the essay has been a bit of a mess."
