= Lay Away =

- Fargo episode
- Episode no.: Season 4 Episode 7
- Directed by: Dana Gonzales
- Written by: Noah Hawley; Enzo Mileti; Scott Wilson
- Cinematography by: Pete Konczal
- Editing by: Debby Germino; Regis Kimble; Curtis Thurber
- Production code: XFO04006
- Original air date: November 1, 2020
- Running time: 43 minutes

Guest appearances
- Timothy Olyphant as Dick "Deafy" Wickware; Kelsey Asbille as Swanee Capps; Sean Fortunato as Antoon Dumini

Episode chronology
← Previous "Camp Elegance"	Next → "The Nadir"
- Fargo (season 4)

"Lay Away" is the seventh episode of the fourth season of the American anthology black comedy–crime drama television series Fargo. It is the 37th overall episode of the series and was written by series creator Noah Hawley, co-executive producer Enzo Mileti, and co-executive producer Scott Wilson, and directed by Dana Gonzales. It originally aired on FX on November 1, 2020.

The season is set in Kansas City, Missouri from November 1950 to early 1951, and follows two crime syndicates as they vie for control of the underground. One of these is Loy Cannon, the head of a crime syndicate made up of black migrants fleeing the Jim Crow South who have a contentious relationship with the Italian Kansas City mafia. In the episode, Josto and Loy meet to discuss a possible end to the feud, which only advances the conflict.

According to Nielsen Media Research, the episode was seen by an estimated 0.65 million household viewers and gained a 0.1 ratings share among adults aged 18–49. The episode received generally positive reviews from critics, although it received criticism for its pacing and lack of coherent narrative.

== Plot ==
Dr. Harvard (Stephen Spencer) is visited in his office by Oraetta (Jessie Buckley), who offers him homemade macarons. Harvard eats one, which turns out to be poisoned, and suffers a seizure. Oraetta then inspects his desk to find the letter, which is signed as "a concerned citizen".

After finding Antoon's body, Josto (Jason Schwartzman) and Calamita (Gaetano Bruno) deduce that Rabbi (Ben Whishaw) betrayed them. Josto orders Calamita to find and kill both Rabbi and Satchel. At the warehouse, Loy (Chris Rock) is pressured to go to war, but he intends on sticking to his plan before it escalates. His wife, Buel (J. Nicole Brooks), is visited at home by Calamita, who believes Satchel is hiding there. However, Calamita is taken aback when she threatens him with a shotgun, prompting him to leave.

Josto and Ebal Violante (Francesco Acquaroli) meet with Loy, Opal Rackley (James Vincent Meredith) and Omie Sparkman (Corey Hendrix) at a warehouse. Fearing for the safety of Gaetano (Salvatore Esposito), Violante offers part of the Fadda territory in exchange for Gaetano. Josto interferes, lying that Satchel and Rabbi have been killed by Calamita. He instead offers Loy the chance to get the territories, as long as he kills Gaetano and Calamita. An enraged Loy tells them to leave, especially when Josto claims they never found the bodies.

Believing Josto's lie, Loy informs Buel, who cries at the news. That night, he considers killing Zero Fadda, but eventually chooses not to do it. The next day, he sees a billboard which highlights credit cards, which makes him realize that Josto is setting him up. Odis (Jack Huston) is taken to Loy's warehouse, where Loy tells him he has a new plan. Loy then visits a kidnapped Gaetano, telling him that his brother offered him a deal just to kill him. He then surprises Gaetano by setting him free, and he orders Sparkman to find and kill Calamita.

== Production ==
=== Development ===
In October 2020, it was reported that the seventh episode of the season would be titled "Lay Away", and was to be written by series creator Noah Hawley, co-executive producer Enzo Mileti and co-executive producer Scott Wilson, and directed by Dana Gonzales. This was Hawley's 30th writing credit, Mileti's second writing credit, Wilson's second writing credit, and Gonzales' third directing credit.

== Reception ==
=== Viewers ===
In its original American broadcast, "Lay Away" was seen by an estimated 0.65 million household viewers and gained a 0.1 ratings share among adults aged 18–49, according to Nielsen Media Research. This means that 0.1 percent of all households with televisions watched the episode. This was a slight decrease in viewership from the previous episode, which was watched by 0.70 million viewers with a 0.1 in the 18-49 demographics.

=== Critical reviews ===
"Lay Away" received generally positive reviews from critics. Zack Handlen of The A.V. Club gave the episode a "B" grade and wrote, "'Lay Away' doesn't lack for characters making big swings; as Oraetta murders her boss and rifles through his desk, Josto decides to go all in on getting his brother killed, and Loy decides not to take the bait. This should all be pretty exciting stuff, and the episode isn't without its share of tension. But the same lack of cohesion, of forward motion, plagues this season almost as much as it did season 3; and while there, the choppiness felt like it might be moving towards an intentional point about modern life, here it's like a story trying to remember why its being told."

Alan Sepinwall of Rolling Stone wrote, "The good news is that we're just about out of this Frankensteined-together middle portion of the season, with two much stronger episodes immediately following. But it's been a bit of a slog to get through this stage of things." Nick Schager of Entertainment Weekly wrote, "Kansas City remains up for grabs in Fargo's seventh episode, 'Lay Away', but that's not to say that criminals aren't trying to seize control of the city. On the contrary, double-crosses abound, as both sides in the brewing gangland war attempt to gain the upper hand through duplicitous means."

Keith Phipps of Vulture gave the episode a 4 star rating out of 5 and wrote, "We're seven episodes in, so it's probably time to start asking this question: Does this season have an endgame? There are currently so many moving pieces, it's not clear where all of them are headed — or if the show has a route to bring them all together at the end." Nick Harley of Den of Geek gave the episode a 3.5 star rating out of 5 and wrote, "While the surrounding elements are feeling noticeably adrift, the main crime story at the heart of this season of Fargo is delivering gangster-filled goodness. Josto's bluff adds a lot of intrigue to the mix, and Chris Rock really cooks with the heavy material that he's given. Even Odis, who started off as a weak collection of tics, looks like he'll be playing an interesting part in this vicious chess match. If Fargo could figure out how to supply all of this season's many characters with purpose like that, this thing could finally take off." Scott Tobias of The New York Times wrote, "In an episode that sets Loy and Josto up for comparison, there can be no doubt that Loy is the craftier of the two, with good instincts and a fuller understanding of what power he does and does not have."

=== Accolades ===
TVLine named Chris Rock as an honorable mention as the "Performer of the Week" for the week of November 7, 2020, for his performance in the episode. The site wrote, "Chris Rock's Fargo crime boss Loy Cannon has kept his cool thus far in Season 4, but his rage boiled over this week as he weathered an onslaught of tragic setbacks. Loy was fuming after the murder of his right-hand man Doctor Senator, and he took it out on his underling Leon, viciously whipping him with a belt for daring to say Senator's name. Then when Josto lied that Loy's son Satchel was dead, Rock twisted Loy's face into a mix of shocked horror and coldblooded calculation, already gaming out his next move. Plus, anyone who's watched Rock do stand-up comedy knows he is a gifted orator, and he put that talent to great use as Loy ranted about the poison of racial prejudice to jittery detective Odis Weff. Fargo has found a way to harness Rock's charisma into a stellar dramatic performance, and this week, he confidently stepped into the spotlight... well, like a boss."
