= Camp Elegance =

- Fargo episode
- Episode no.: Season 4 Episode 6
- Directed by: Dana Gonzales
- Written by: Noah Hawley; Enzo Mileti; Scott Wilson; Francesca Sloane
- Cinematography by: Pete Konczal
- Editing by: Regis Kimble
- Production code: XFO04011
- Original air date: October 25, 2020
- Running time: 46 minutes

Guest appearances
- Glynn Turman as Doctor Senator; Timothy Olyphant as Dick "Deafy" Wickware; Kelsey Asbille as Swanee Capps; Sean Fortunato as Antoon Dumini

Episode chronology
← Previous "The Birthplace of Civilization"	Next → "Lay Away"
- Fargo (season 4)

"Camp Elegance" is the sixth episode of the fourth season of the American anthology black comedy–crime drama television series Fargo. It is the 36th overall episode of the series and was written by series creator Noah Hawley, co-executive producer Enzo Mileti, co-executive producer Scott Wilson, and producer Francesca Sloane and directed by Dana Gonzales. It originally aired on FX on October 25, 2020.

The season is set in Kansas City, Missouri from November 1950 to early 1951, and follows two crime syndicates as they vie for control of the underground. One of these is Loy Cannon, the head of a crime syndicate made up of black migrants fleeing the Jim Crow South who have a contentious relationship with the Italian Kansas City mafia. In the episode, Odis is forced to work for Loy in spying the Fadda Family, while Rabbi must question his loyalty.

According to Nielsen Media Research, the episode was seen by an estimated 0.70 million household viewers and gained a 0.1 ratings share among adults aged 18–49. The episode received mostly positive reviews from critics, who praised the tension and momentum, although some criticized the pacing, monologues and character development.

== Plot ==
Odis (Jack Huston) arrives at his apartment, only to be ambushed by Loy (Chris Rock) and his henchmen. Odis states he can get Loy's money back, but Loy is only interested in having him as a spy. As Loy and his henchmen leave, they are watched by Deafy (Timothy Olyphant).

Under Loy's orders, Zelmare (Karen Aldridge) and Swanee (Kelsey Asbille) enter and kill some Faddas at a compound, where Gaetano (Salvatore Esposito) is hiding. They shoot Gaetano on one side of his head and then bring him, still alive, to Loy. In retaliation for Doctor Senator's death, Loy has Omie Sparkman (Corey Hendrix), a former boxer, brutally beat Gaetano. At St. Bartholomew's hospital, Dr. Harvard (Stephen Spencer) has received the letter that Ethelrida (E'myri Crutchfield) sent him, questioning Oraetta (Jessie Buckley) about her involvement with patients. She manages to fend off suspicion but is told to stop getting involved in their lives, while also being refused to see the letter.

Ebal Violante (Francesco Acquaroli) returns from New York City, accompanied with mobster Joe Bulo (Evan Mulrooney), who has agreed to help the Fadda family. Violante informs Josto (Jason Schwartzman) about their new alliance with New York in exchange to "fixing" the problem with the Cannon Limited. They are interrupted by Calamita (Gaetano Bruno), who informs them of Gaetano's kidnapping. Violante also learns about Senator's murder. Josto decides to leave Gaetano to die. However, this conflicts with New York's other request, which involves mending things with Gaetano if he wants to be acknowledged as the boss.

Loy orders Odis to rescue Satchel by any means necessary. He goes to the Fadda house, but his mission is interrupted by Josto, who requests him to find Gaetano. Josto also meets with Violante to discuss a potential trade with the Cannon Limited. He decides to have his brother-in-law, Antoon (Sean Fortunato), kill Satchel, which would lead Loy to kill Gaetano. Antoon takes Satchel from his house, despite his wife's protests. Discovering the location, Rabbi (Ben Whishaw) hurriedly goes there. Antoon prepares to shoot Satchel but is unable to do so. He is then killed by Rabbi, who tells Satchel that they need to escape the coming mob war. They both get in Rabbi's car and leave the scene.

== Production ==
=== Development ===
In September 2020, it was reported that the sixth episode of the season would be titled "Camp Elegance", and was to be written by series creator Noah Hawley, co-executive producer Enzo Mileti, co-executive producer Scott Wilson and producer Francesca Sloane, and directed by Dana Gonzales. This was Hawley's 29th writing credit, Mileti's first writing credit, Wilson's first writing credit, Sloane's second writing credit, and Gonzales' second directing credit.

== Reception ==
=== Viewers ===
In its original American broadcast, "Camp Elegance" was seen by an estimated 0.70 million household viewers and gained a 0.1 ratings share among adults aged 18–49, according to Nielsen Media Research. This means that 0.1 percent of all households with televisions watched the episode. This was a 6% decrease in viewership from the previous episode, which was watched by 0.74 million viewers with a 0.2 in the 18-49 demographics.

=== Critical reviews ===
"Camp Elegance" received mostly positive reviews from critics. Zack Handlen of The A.V. Club gave the episode a "B+" grade and wrote, "Right now, a lot of Fargo is interesting, in that I'm curious how things will end up, and it was certainly a bummer when Doctor Senator got shot; but outside of intellectual satisfaction, I don't really care that much what happens to Josto or Loy or almost anyone outside of Ethelrida, Rabbi, and Satchel. I wouldn't say the show is boring at this point. But a lot of what's going on has a detached quality, a certain roteness that keeps it from feeling specific beyond the names."

Alan Sepinwall of Rolling Stone wrote, "There's some very good stuff coming up, including some material involving Rabbi and Satchel that's easily the season’s highlight. But this has been an imperfect season, and many of those imperfections come to the forefront this time out." Nick Schager of Entertainment Weekly wrote, "It's only a matter of time before the Faddas and the Cannons engage in all-out conflict. And though that doesn't commence in 'Camp Elegance', tensions continue to incrementally escalate, putting everyone in harm's way."

Keith Phipps of Vulture gave the episode a 4 star rating out of 5 and wrote, "Of course, whether there will be much of a Kansas City left after the war remains an unanswered question." Nick Harley of Den of Geek gave the episode a 3.5 star rating out of 5 and wrote, "As the shortest episode of the season thus far, 'Camp Elegance' uses its time economically. Though Odis isn't my favorite character, it's fun to see him torn between the warring families. Things will likely get trickier for him once Deafy fully inserts himself into the mix. Gaetano's fake out death wasn't great, but I can't wait to see him in full on Hannibal Lector behind bars mode. Finally, Rabbi has fully fulfilled his potential, and his status as a noble third party in this story gives us someone to root for. It's not all working exactly how it should, but Fargo is managing to entertain more often than not." Scott Tobias of The New York Times wrote, "The problem isn't so much the monologues themselves — though the figurine analogy is absolutely terrible — but the predictability of deploying them. When the audience can see a speech coming, it's no different than being a mile ahead of the plot. Worse still, it throws the brakes on a conflict that's been escalating steadily and is on the verge of busting out into the open. It plays against the show's long-running strength for spinning a good yarn."
