= Li Jun Li =

American actress (active since 2008)

- 李丽君
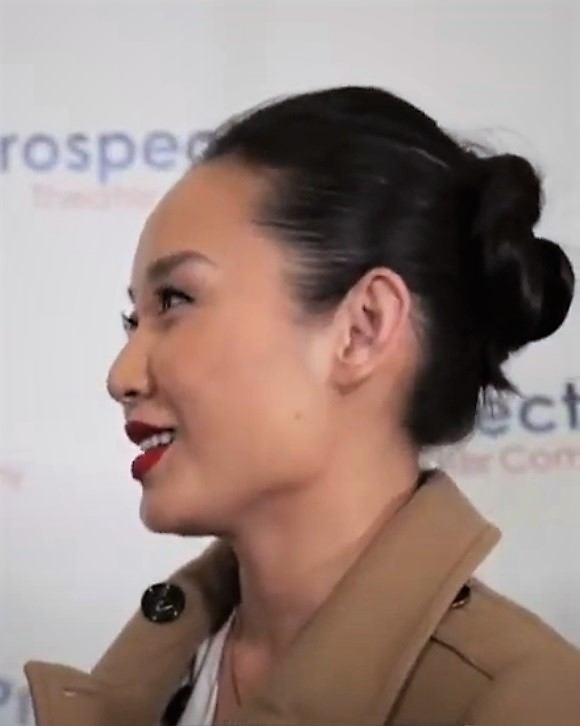
- Li in 2018
- Born: Shanghai, China
- Occupation: Actress
- Years active: 2008–present

Li Jun Li (Chinese: 李丽君; pinyin: Lǐ Lìjūn) is an American actress, known for her roles as Iris Chang in the ABC series Quantico, Rose Cooper in the Fox series The Exorcist, Jenny Wah in the Netflix series Wu Assassins, Lady Fay Zhu in the period drama Babylon (2022), Grace Chow in the horror film Sinners (2025), and Felicia "Cat" Hardy in the neo-noir superhero series Spider-Noir (2026).

== Early life ==
Li was born in Shanghai, China. Her father was a painter and he moved the family to Bogotá, Colombia for work when Li was six years old. Three years later they immigrated to New York City in the United States.

She graduated from Fiorello H. LaGuardia High School's dance program and also attended SUNY Purchase Acting Conservatory.

== Career ==
Li had her first break in the acting world starring in Rodgers and Hammerstein's South Pacific (2008) at New York's Lincoln Center. Following on from this early success, she won roles on a variety of TV shows and films including Blue Bloods (2010), Damages (2011), The Following (2013), Cédric Klapisch's Chinese Puzzle (2013) and Mistress (2014). Li expanded her visibility and presence on a global level by landing major television roles in Neil LaBute's Billy and Billie (2015) and Minority Report (2015) on Fox.

In 2016, Li was cast in the recurring role of FBI recruit Iris Chang on the ABC thriller series Quantico. In the same year, she joined the NBC procedural Chicago P.D. in the fourth season.

On July 26, 2017, it was announced by Deadline Hollywood that Li would join as a series regular in the second season of the Fox television series The Exorcist as Rose Cooper.

On January 15, 2019, it was announced that Li had been cast in the series regular role of Jenny Wah on the Netflix supernatural crime drama series Wu Assassins. In December 2020, she was cast in Damien Chazelle's film Babylon, playing a role inspired by silent film actress Anna May Wong. The film received polarizing reviews, though her performance attracted some praise.

In April 2024, Li was cast as shopkeeper Grace Chow in Ryan Coogler's Sinners, which premiered in 2025, receiving critical acclaim and giving Li the Gotham Independent Film Awards Ensemble Tribute Award as part of the film's cast.

In July 2024, Li was cast as series regular on the MGM+ and Prime Video live-action series based on the Marvel comic Spider-Man Noir.

In April 2026, it was announced that Li had been cast as Miriam, the mother of Yara and Lev, in the third season of the HBO drama series The Last of Us. She was also cast as Min in the fourth and final season of the Netflix series The Night Agent.

== Filmography ==
=== Film ===
Year	Title	Role
2013	Chinese Puzzle	Nancy
2014	Song One	YouTube interviewer
2014	The Humbling	Tracy
2015	Front Cover	Miao
2015	Ricki and the Flash	Nail clerk
2022	Babylon	Lady Fay Zhu
2025	Alma and the Wolf	Alma
2025	Sinners	Grace Chow

=== Television ===
Key
†	Denotes television productions that have not yet been released

Year	Title	Role	Notes
2010	Live from Lincoln Center	Liat	Episode: "South Pacific"
2010	Blue Bloods	Nicka	Episode: "After Hours"
2011	Body of Proof	Mira Ling	Episode: "Talking Heads"
2011	One Life to Live	Gothic Vegas chapel assistant	1 episode
2011	Law & Order: Criminal Intent	Yasmin	Episode: "Rispetto"
2011–2012	Damages	Maggie Huang	Recurring role (seasons 4 & 5)
2012	Americana	Eloise Russell	Television film
2012	Freestyle Love Supreme	Danielle	Television film
2012	Smash	Store clerk	Episode: "Enter Mr. DiMaggio"
2013	The Following	Meghan Leeds	Recurring role (season 1)
2013	Hatfields & McCoys	Cara Quo	Television film
2013	Hostages	Attractive woman	Episode: "Truth and Consequences"
2014	Unforgettable	Natalie	Episode: "New Hundred"
2015	One Bad Choice	Lisette Lee	Episode: "Meili Cady"
2015	Minority Report	Akeela	Main role
2015–2016	Billy and Billie	Denise	
2015–2016	Chicago P.D.	Anna Tse / Julie Tay	5 episodes
2016	Chicago Fire	Julie Tay	Episode: "The Hose or the Animal"
2016–2017	Quantico	Iris Chang	Recurring role
2017	Blindspot	Karen Sun	Recurring role (season 2)
2017–2018	The Exorcist	Rose Cooper	Main role (season 2)
2018	Gone	Dana Parker	Episode: "Don't Go"
2019	Wu Assassins	Jenny Wah	Main role
2019	Why Women Kill	Amy Grove	3 episodes
2019–2024	Evil	Grace Ling	Recurring role
2022	Devils	Wu Zhi	Main role (season 2)
2021–2023	Sex/Life	Francesca	Recurring role
2023	Based on a True Story	Michelle	Recurring role (season 1)
2026	Spider-Noir	Felicia "Cat" Hardy	Main role
2027	The Last of Us †	Miriam	Guest (season 3)
TBA	The Night Agent †	Min	Main role (season 4)
