= Francesca Sloane =

American screenwriter and producer

- Born: February 1984 (age 42)
- Education: UCLA
- Occupations: Screenwriter, producer
- Years active: 2017–present
- Known for: Mr. & Mrs. Smith

Francesca Sloane is an American screenwriter and producer. She is best known for co-creating the series Mr. & Mrs. Smith with Donald Glover, and as a writer and supervising producer on Atlanta.

== Early life ==
Francesca Sloane was raised in both Philadelphia and El Salvador. She received her undergraduate degree at California Institute of the Arts. Sloane then went on to study at UCLA for her master's degree, where her feature film screenplay, Headbangers, won a screenwriting competition.

== Career ==
Sloane began her screenwriting career in 2017 on the series StartUp, as the writer of the third episode of the second season, "Early Adopters". In 2018, she wrote the sixth episode of the series Seven Seconds, "Until It Do". Sloane also worked on the Hulu series The First, created by Beau Willimon, where she wrote two episodes, including the series finale ("Two Portraits" and "Near and Far").

In 2020, Sloane joined the writing team for the FX series Fargo, created by Noah Hawley, based on the 1996 film of the same name. While in the writing team for Fargo, she co-wrote two episodes of the fourth season ("The Birthplace of Civilization" and "Camp Elegance"), and also served as a producer.

Sloane signed an overall deal with Amazon MGM Studios in 2020, and her first project was to develop a series based on the works of Anaïs Nin. The series will be titled A Spy in the House of Love, based on the book of the same name, and Sloane will serve as writer and executive producer.

In 2022, Sloane served as a supervising producer on another FX series, Donald Glover's Atlanta. She wrote three episodes; one in the third season ("The Big Payback") and two in the fourth and final season. ("Snipe Hunt" and "The Goof Who Sat By the Door"). Sloane began working on Atlanta from recommendation by writer Stephanie Robinson, who recommended her to Glover after they worked together on Fargo.

After working with Glover on Atlanta, he asked her to co-create the Amazon Prime Video series Mr. & Mrs. Smith with him and serve as the showrunner after Phoebe Waller-Bridge exited the project. On the series, she wrote six of the eight episodes. Mr. & Mrs. Smith, which premiered in February 2024, is a reboot of the 2005 film of the same name. She planned to run the show for a second season, but during production delays, her overall deal with Amazon MGM Studios ended, and she went to HBO.

In September 2025, development of the third season of Big Little Lies was confirmed, with Sloane hired as executive producer and writer of the first episode.

== Filmography ==
Year	Title	Writer	Creator	Producer	Notes
2017	StartUp	Yes	No	No	Wrote 1 episode
2018	Seven Seconds	Yes	No	No	Wrote 1 episode
2018	The First	Yes	No	No	Wrote 2 episodes
2020	Fargo	Yes	No	Yes	Co-wrote 2 episodes
2022	Atlanta	Yes	No	Supervising	Wrote 3 episodes
2024	Mr. & Mrs. Smith	Yes	Yes	Executive	Showrunner (s1), wrote 6 episodes
2025	Big Little Lies	Yes	No	Executive	Wrote 1 episode
