= Alma and the Wolf =

- Theatrical release poster
- Directed by: Michael Patrick Jann
- Written by: Abigail Miller
- Produced by: Jann Codron; David Codron
- Starring: Ethan Embry; Li Jun Li; Jeremie Harris; Lukas Jann; Kevin Allison; Mather Zickel; Beth Malone; Alexandra Doke; Dana Millican
- Cinematography: Joe Kessler
- Edited by: Todd Sandler
- Music by: Jherek Bischoff
- Production company: TPC
- Distributed by: Republic Pictures
- Release dates: March 22, 2025 (BUFF); June 20, 2025 (United States)
- Running time: 85 minutes
- Country: United States
- Language: English

Alma and the Wolf is a 2025 American psychological horror mystery film directed by Michael Patrick Jann and written by Abigail Miller. It stars Ethan Embry, Li Jun Li, Jeremie Harris, Lukas Jann, Kevin Allison, Mather Zickel, Beth Malone, Alexandra Doke, and Dana Millican.

== Cast ==
- Ethan Embry as Ren Accord
- Li Jun Li as Alma
- Jeremie Harris as Murph
- Lukas Jann as Jack
- Kevin Allison as Stanton
- Mather Zickel as Ashley
- Beth Malone as Betty
- Alexandra Doke as Pam
- Dana Millican as Connie
- David Koff as Principal Griffin

== Production ==
In March 2024, it was revealed that a psychological horror mystery film titled Alma and the Wolf had begun principal photography in Oregon, with Michael Patrick Jann directing and Abigail Miller writing the screenplay. Ethan Embry, Li Jun Li, Jeremie Harris, Lukas Jann, Kevin Allison, Mather Zickel, Beth Malone, Alexandra Doke, and Dana Millican had joined the ensemble cast, and Republic Pictures acquired worldwide rights. Filming had occurred at Pacific City, Oregon.

== Release ==
Alma and the Wolf premiered at the Boston Underground Film Festival in Cambridge, Massachusetts on March 22, 2025.
