= Welcome to the Alternate Economy =

- Fargo episode
- Episode no.: Season 4 Episode 1
- Directed by: Noah Hawley
- Written by: Noah Hawley
- Cinematography by: Dana Gonzales
- Editing by: Regis Kimble
- Production code: XFO04001
- Original air date: September 27, 2020
- Running time: 62 minutes

Guest appearances
- Glynn Turman as Doctor Senator; Tommaso Ragno as Donatello Fadda; Andrew Rothenberg as Liev Moskowitz; Sean Fortunato as Antoon Dumini

Episode chronology
← Previous "Somebody to Love"	Next → "The Land of Taking and Killing"
- Fargo (season 4)

"Welcome to the Alternate Economy" is the season premiere of the fourth season of the American anthology black comedy–crime drama television series Fargo. It is the 31st overall episode of the series and was written and directed by series creator Noah Hawley. It originally aired on FX on September 27, 2020, airing back-to-back with the follow-up episode, "The Land of Taking and Killing".

The season is set in Kansas City, Missouri from November 1950 to early 1951, and follows two crime syndicates as they vie for control of the underground. One of these is Loy Cannon, the head of a crime syndicate made up of black migrants fleeing the Jim Crow South who have a contentious relationship with the Italian Kansas City mafia.

According to Nielsen Media Research, the episode was seen by an estimated 1.22 million household viewers and gained a 0.2 ratings share among adults aged 18–49. The episode received generally positive reviews from critics, who praised the cinematography and production design, although some expressed criticism for the pacing, over-abundance of characters and lack of character development.

== Plot ==
In 1950, Ethelrida Smutny (E'myri Crutchfield) narrates the history of organized crime in Kansas City as part of a school report. Thirty years earlier, in 1920, a Jewish crime organization, the Moskowitz Syndicate, and an Irish gang, the Milligan Concern, meet to settle their feud. To maintain peace, the bosses trade each other's sons.

In 1928, Milligan's son, Patrick, betrays his adoptive family by allowing the Milligan Concern to wipe out the entire Moskowitz Syndicate, with his father forcing him to kill Moskowitz's son. In 1934, the Milligan Concern goes through the same peace process with the newly arrived Sardinian Fadda Family, with Patrick once again being exchanged for Donatello Fadda's son. This time, Patrick allows the Fadda Family to kill his own family. Donatello (Tommaso Ragno) has Patrick kill his own father, who curses him and his children. Donatello adopts Patrick as part of the Fadda Family. In 1949, the Fadda Family go through the same trade, now with a New York African-American gang, the Cannon Limited, led by Loy Cannon (Chris Rock). Loy's son, Satchel, is traded for Donatello's son, Zero. A grown-up Patrick, now known as Rabbi (Ben Whishaw), promises to look after Satchel.

Back in 1950, Loy and Donatello meet in a park to see their kids play. Donatello's son, Josto (Jason Schwartzman), almost gets into a fight with some of Loy's henchmen. As they drive back, Donatello reprimands Josto for his attitude, also informing him that his brother Gaetano is coming over to visit. While waiting at a stop sign, Donatello's henchmen are alarmed by a possible attack, but it turns out to be a false alarm. Donatello appears to have a heart attack, although this turns out to be nothing but an enormous fart. However, he is accidentally shot in the jugular by a kid with a BB gun. Josto and his henchmen hurriedly take him to the nearest private hospital. However, the director, Dr. David Harvard (Stephen Spencer), refuses to help them due to their Italian heritage and orders them to leave. The Faddas are forced to take Donatello to the public hospital, St. Bartholomew's, while Josto threatens Harvard for his negligence.

Loy and his consigliere, Doctor Senator (Glynn Turman), meet with a powerful banker to propose an investment idea: credit cards. The banker refuses to invest in the idea, feeling that his customers won't be interested. At St. Bartholomew's, Josto is informed that Donatello is in a critical but stable condition. He meets a nurse, Oraetta Mayflower (Jessie Buckley), and they bond by using drugs. Josto asks her to take care of his father. Later, with guards sleeping, Oraetta visits Donatello and injects him with morphine, killing him and stealing his ring.

Ethelrida finds that her mixed-race parents, who run a funeral home, have been talking with Loy for the past few days. That night, as she sits outside her house, she is joined by her father Thurman (Andrew Bird), who explains that he had accepted a large loan from Loy to solve his money problems and is unable to repay. As they go inside, Oraetta is revealed to have been watching them from her apartment across the street.

== Production ==
=== Development ===
In September 2020, it was reported that the first episode of the season would be titled "Welcome to the Alternate Economy", and was to be written and directed by series creator Noah Hawley. This was Hawley's 24th writing credit, and his third directing credit. The episode was originally scheduled to premiere on April 19, 2020. In March 2020, however, FX announced that the premiere would be delayed due to the COVID-19 pandemic, which forced the production to shut down with two episodes left to be filmed.

== Reception ==
=== Viewers ===
In its original American broadcast, "Welcome to the Alternate Economy" was seen by an estimated 1.22 million household viewers and gained a 0.2 ratings share among adults aged 18–49, according to Nielsen Media Research. This means that 0.2 percent of all households with televisions watched the episode. This was in line in viewership from the previous episode, which was watched by 1.22 million viewers with a 0.3 in the 18-49 demographics.

=== Critical reviews ===
"Welcome to the Alternate Economy" received generally positive reviews from critics. Zack Handlen of The A.V. Club gave the episode a "B" grade and wrote, "A lot happens, there's an undercurrent of rising danger, but little sense of a story or narrative unfolding; it's most just a collection of scenes which, presumably, will all be relevant to one another if we keep watching."

Alan Sepinwall of Rolling Stone wrote, "There is an awful lot going on here in terms of plot, character, and theme — perhaps too much. We'll have to see how this all comes together by the end to know what's essential, what's a colorful enough flourish to justify its presence anyway, and what's just pointless extraneous quirkiness. But 'Welcome to the Alternate Economy' is so packed with people and mythology that it has to be presented as part of Ethelrida's report." Nick Schager of Entertainment Weekly wrote, "Out of respect for the dead — and the show — the entirety of its sprawling, complex crime narrative will be told exactly as it occurred. And there's plenty of plot to relay, even if its premiere installment, 'Welcome to the Alternate Economy', gets things off to a slow, if intriguing, start."

Keith Phipps of Vulture gave the episode a 4 star rating out of 5 and wrote, "We'll undoubtedly find out more as the season progresses, just as we'll find out more about Josto and Loy. The glimpses we get of the taciturn Loy at home, where he apparently leads a quiet family life despite trading away his son for another man's suggest we've only seen the surface of the character. In fact, 'Welcome to the Alternate Economy' is so packed with characters and information it often feels like we're zooming past important elements." Nick Harley of Den of Geek wrote, "This is a jam-packed premiere episode that has pacing problems. The crisp, deftly edited intro makes the rest of the runtime lag a bit. Fargo's signature three-panel split screen appears, but it doesn't really serve any purpose or demonstrate any real style. I also have concerns about their being too many characters. Key figures like Satchel Cannon, Zero Fadda, and Loy's wife Buel could hypothetically anchor this season, but they already appear to be being pushed to the margins. I'm glad Fargo has returned, but I sure hope it stays focused." Scott Tobias of The New York Times wrote, "The first two episodes, which aired back-to-back on Sunday, draw these battle lines starkly, but they also suggest key areas where ethnic and racial barriers are crossed, with all the promise and danger that goes along with it."
