= East/West (Fargo) =

- Fargo episode
- Episode no.: Season 4 Episode 9
- Directed by: Michael Uppendahl
- Written by: Noah Hawley; Lee Edward Colston II
- Cinematography by: Dana Gonzales
- Editing by: Jordan Goldman; Curtis Thurber
- Production code: XFO04008
- Original air date: November 15, 2020
- Running time: 51 minutes

Guest appearances
- Rodney L. Jones III as Satchel Cannon; Tim Hopper as Hunk Swindell; Cedric Young as Willy Bupor; Andrew Rothenberg as Liev Moskowitz

Episode chronology
← Previous "The Nadir"	Next → "Happy"
- Fargo (season 4)

"East/West" is the ninth episode of the fourth season of the American anthology black comedy–crime drama television series Fargo. It is the 39th overall episode of the series and was written by series creator Noah Hawley and Lee Edward Colston II, and directed by Michael Uppendahl. It originally aired on FX on November 15, 2020.

The season is set in Kansas City, Missouri from November 1950 to early 1951, and follows two crime syndicates as they vie for control of the underground. One of these is Loy Cannon, the head of a crime syndicate made up of black migrants fleeing the Jim Crow South who have a contentious relationship with the Italian Kansas City mafia. In the episode, Rabbi and Satchel arrive at a boarding house in Liberal, Kansas, hoping to evade Calamita. The episode is presented in black and white and serves as a homage to The Wizard of Oz.

According to Nielsen Media Research, the episode was seen by an estimated 0.82 million household viewers and gained a 0.1 ratings share among adults aged 18–49. The episode received positive reviews from critics, with many calling it the best episode of the season; its cinematography, directing, character development, and originality were widely praised.

== Plot ==
The episode is presented in black and white. Omie Sparkman (Corey Hendrix) has kidnapped a Fadda henchman named Aldo Abruzo (Joel Reitsma), who discloses that Calamita (Gaetano Bruno) is pursuing Satchel (Rodney L. Jones III) and Rabbi (Ben Whishaw) to Liberal, Kansas. He stops at a gas station, where the attendant claims that it is the only one in the area, indicating that Calamita will certainly stop there at some point. Omie is told by the attendant that he can wait at the station if he helps to finish repainting it; he releases Aldo from the trunk and orders him to help. During a break, Aldo tries to escape when a lone car arrives, forcing Omie to kill him. When the car pulls up, it is revealed that Calamita is its driver.

One day before, Rabbi is driving Satchel to safety in Liberal. They stay at a boarding house that has been divided into two sections of "East" and "West" by the two feuding sisters who own it, with Rabbi choosing the West section that abides by the New Testament. Rabbi leaves to find money he had left in town years prior, only to find that the spot has been replaced after being left abandoned for so long, thus losing all of the money he had left. In their room, Satchel finds a terrier named "Rabbit" and decides to adopt it. When Rabbi brings Satchel into town the next day, they run into a few civilians, including a police officer who almost draws his gun on Satchel, and a man who laments finishing a billboard he was hired to paint, as he will find himself jobless once he is done.

Rabbi decides that they must leave Liberal, telling Satchel he cannot take the dog with him. Satchel complains that he wanted something for his birthday. Remorseful for not knowing it was his birthday, Rabbi decides to buy him a candy bar from a nearby gas station as a gift, telling Satchel he will be back. As a storm approaches, he arrives at the gas station, finding the dead bodies of the attendant and Aldo, along with a wounded Omie being held at gunpoint by Calamita. As the storm becomes more intense, Calamita notices Rabbi and shoots him in the shoulder. Omie hits back at Calamita, who in turn shoots him dead. Before Calamita can finish Rabbi off, they are both distracted by a large tornado that has formed nearby and is moving towards them. The tornado destroys the gas station and sucks Rabbi and Calamita into the vortex, killing them both.

Back at the boarding house, the scene transitions to color. Satchel wakes up and finds that Rabbi has not returned. Feeling taunted by one of the guests, he locks himself in his room until the next day. When he awakens to find that Rabbi has still not returned, he decides to leave with Rabbit, armed with a revolver that Rabbi gave him. As he walks along the road, he passes the now-finished billboard.

== Production ==
=== Development ===
In October 2020, it was reported that the ninth episode of the season would be titled "East/West", and was to be written by series creator Noah Hawley, and Lee Edward Colston II, and directed by Michael Uppendahl. This was Hawley's 32nd writing credit, Colston's second writing credit, and Uppendahl's sixth directing credit.

=== Filming ===
The episode serves as a homage to The Wizard of Oz, including its presentation in black and white. Before the season started filming, Noah Hawley instructed the crew that the main direction for the season would be "follow the yellow brick road". He further added that The Wizard of Oz "crept into the storytelling, so it felt like this was the place to embrace that metaphor." On the decision to film in black and white, he said "The Wizard of Oz was always built into the season on some level, and that includes cinematically in that hour of going from black-and-white to color. If you're going to do that, you have to start with black-and-white. And obviously, the twister comes in just a few minutes before the end of the episode."

Cinematographer Dana Gonzales commented, "This season was really like the history of American photography. What we did all season was build these palettes from the ground up, together. That's how we create these defined looks, and then we do the shift to color. All of us have to work together perfectly to make the distinct look at this season is — it happened with the color, and the black and white was just another end-of-season challenge."

== Reception ==
=== Viewers ===
In its original American broadcast, "East/West" was seen by an estimated 0.82 million household viewers and gained a 0.1 ratings share among adults aged 18–49, according to Nielsen Media Research. This means that 0.1 percent of all households with televisions watched the episode. This was a 17% increase in viewership from the previous episode, which was watched by 0.70 million viewers with a 0.2 in the 18-49 demographics.

=== Critical reviews ===
"East/West" received mostly positive reviews from critics. Zack Handlen of The A.V. Club gave the episode a "B+" grade and wrote, "I don't think I was ever bored by this, and it feels a bit churlish to criticize something just because it wasn't as good as you wanted it to be. But the flaws of 'East/West' feel endemic of the flaws of the season as a whole. When it finds time to pay attention to its best characters, it works. When it aims bigger, it fumbles. 'East/West' splits the difference, for better and worse."

Alan Sepinwall of Rolling Stone wrote, "'East/West', written by Noah Hawley and Lee Edward Colston II, and directed by Mike Uppendahl, is by far the most Coen-y episode of Fargo Season Four, in large part because it's Hawley and company's own attempt to remake The Wizard of Oz." Nick Schager of Entertainment Weekly wrote, "'Life is nothing but a competition to be the criminal rather than the victim', reads the Bertrand Russell quote that opens 'East/West'. And as Fargo's ninth episode suggests, it's a contest in which the participants have very little control."

Keith Phipps of Vulture gave the episode a 4 star rating out of 5 and wrote, "In 'East/West', Omie begins the episode on a journey to make good on that promise, one that takes him to a middle-of-nowhere gas station somewhere between Kansas City and the town of Liberal, Kansas. That's a major development in this season’s storyline, but it also mostly serves as a framing device for the episode, season four's oddest episode and as wild a departure as the series has ever attempted." Nick Harley of Den of Geek gave the episode a 4 star rating out of 5 and wrote, "'East/West' was still a fun detour during a mostly by-the-numbers season. With just two episodes left, will this be the best Season 4 has to offer?" Scott Tobias of The New York Times wrote, "One of the challenges of serialized television shows, especially plot-heavy thrillers like Fargo, is that the demands of moving the various subplots forward can keep individual episodes from having their own distinct flavor. The fourth season has fallen into that mid-season trap a little, sacrificing the thematic purposefulness of the early episodes for a little too much plate-spinning. It needed an audacious, standalone hour like this week's episode to reassert itself again."
