= Jeremie Harris =

American actor

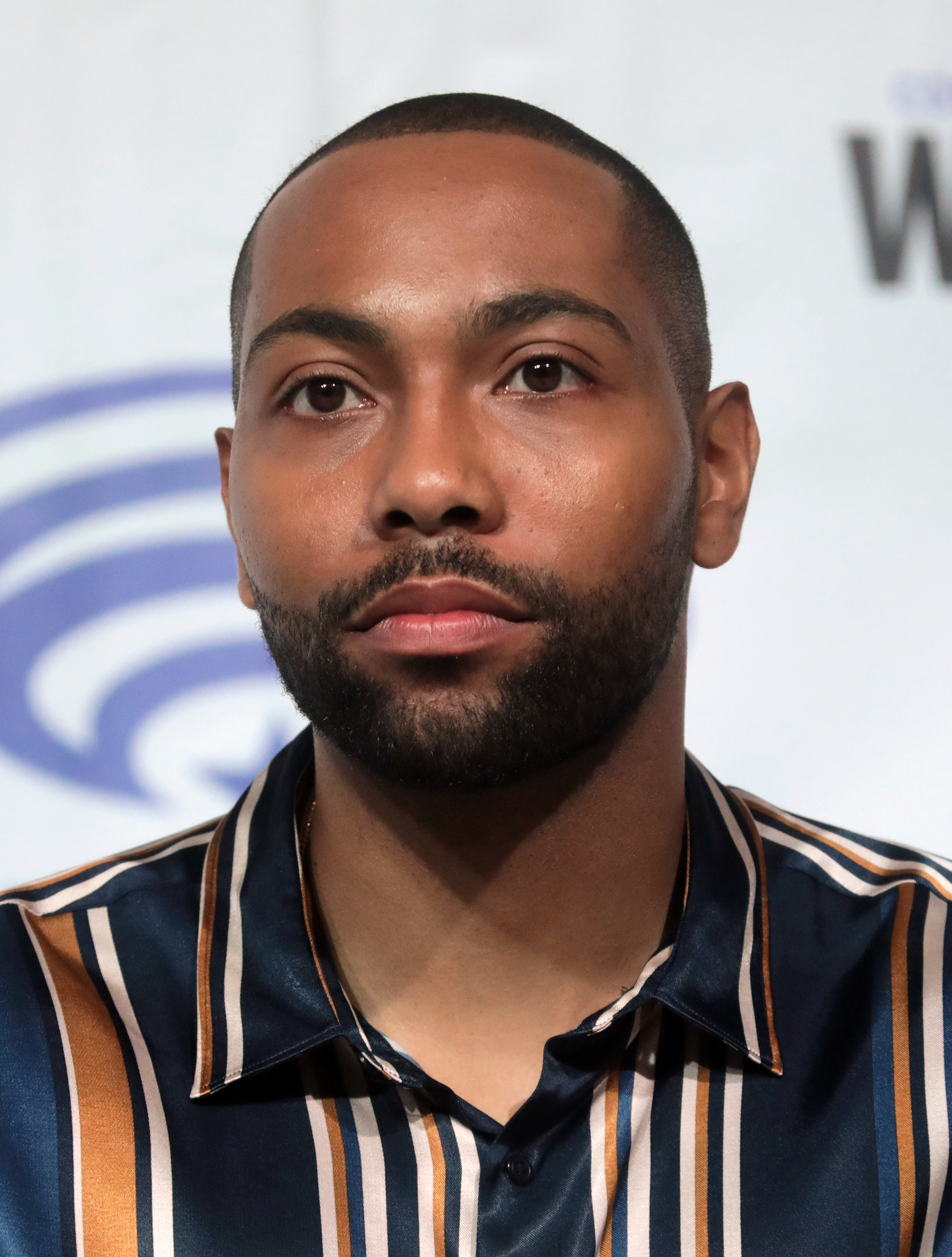
- Harris at the 2019 WonderCon
- Born: Bronx, New York
- Education: New York University (BA); Juilliard School (MFA)
- Occupation: Actor
- Years active: 2005–present

Jeremie Harris is an American actor. He is primarily known for his portrayal of Ptonomy Wallace in FX's Legion.

== Biography ==
Jeremie Harris grew up in New Rochelle where he had ambitions to become a basketball player. He gave up on this dream when he "didn’t become 6’6″ and have a 40-inch vertical". He interned at Def Jam Recordings where he earned his living by putting up posters. He was caught by police when he began sniping other posters. He was let go with a warning and quit due to the music industries' "cutthroat business". He decided to try acting while studying business at New York University and came close to earning a role in the movie Sky High. Following some acting roles at NYU, he graduated from NYU and then completed his studies at Juilliard. He has since appeared in major projects such as A Walk Among the Tombstones, Blue Bloods and The Get Down. Jeremie was cast as Ptonomy Wallace in FX's Legion.

== Filmography ==
Film roles
Year	Title	Role	Notes
2005	Orange Bow	Anthony	Short
2011	Pariah	Bina's Boyfriend	
2013	Harmony Hill	Rod	Short
2014	The Angriest Man in Brooklyn	Leon	
2014	A Walk Among the Tombstones	Baller #2	
2017	Bushwick	JP	
2017	Love Beats Rhymes	Matt	
2017	After Party	Gavin	
2019	Crypto	Earl	
2020	Vampires vs. the Bronx	Henny	
2023	Cinnamon	James Walker	
2025	Alma and the Wolf	TBA	

Television roles
Year	Title	Role	Notes
2012	Person of Interest	Agent Clark	Episode: "Bury the Lede"
2014	Blue Bloods	Lyle Trevino	Episode: "Unfinished Business"
2015	Bessie	Langston Hughes	TV movie
2017	The Get Down	Shane Vincent	Recurring
2017–2019	Legion	Ptonomy Wallace	Main cast
2020	Fargo	Leon Bittle	Main cast
