= Sylvain White =

French film director (born 1975)

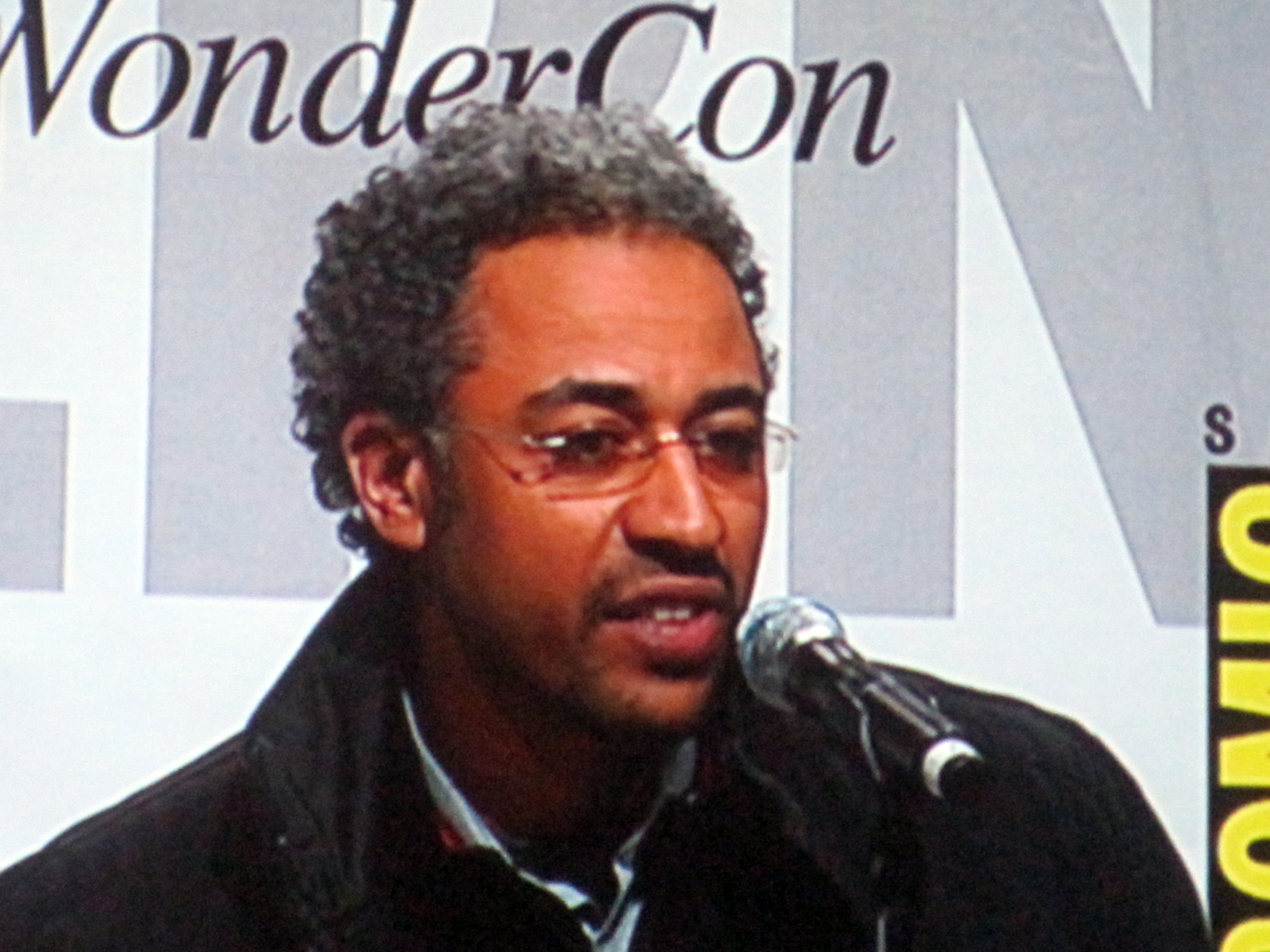
- White at WonderCon 2010
- Born: 12 February 1975 (age 51); Paris, France
- Education: Pomona College
- Occupations: Film director; screenwriter
- Years active: 1998–present

Sylvain White (born 12 February 1975) is a French film director and screenwriter.

== Early life and education ==
Filmmaker Sylvain White was born and raised in Paris, France.

At 18 he attended the University of La Sorbonne, then earned a scholarship to go to film school at Pomona College outside Los Angeles. After graduating with honors in both film production and media studies, a series of award-winning short films led him to direct a spectrum of music videos and commercials in the US, Europe and Japan.

== Career ==
He debuted feature film Stomp the Yard, at number one in the US for Sony. He went on to direct the action comedy The Losers, starring Chris Evans, Idris Elba and Zoe Saldaña. He wrote and directed the French murder mystery The Mark of the Angels, starring Gérard Depardieu, and followed by directing the theatrical summer horror film Slender Man for Sony.

White has also directed episodes on television series such as Fargo, The Umbrella Academy, For All Mankind, Billions, Justified, The Americans, The Terminal List, Amazing Stories, CSI, Hawaii Five-0, The Following, Person of Interest, Major Crimes and Sleepy Hollow.

== Filmography ==
=== Feature film ===
Year	Title	Director	Writer	Notes
2004	Trois 3: The Escort	Yes	No	Credited as "Skav One"
2006	I'll Always Know What You Did Last Summer	Yes	No	Direct-to-video
2007	Stomp the Yard	Yes	No	
2009	Walled In	No	Yes	
2010	The Losers	Yes	No	
2013	The Mark of the Angels – Miserere	Yes	Yes	
2018	Slender Man	Yes	No	

=== Short film ===
Year	Title	Director	Writer
2002	Quiet	Yes	No
2013	Bring the Love Back	Yes	Yes

=== Television ===
Year	Title	Notes
2012	CSI: Miami	1 episode
2012–2016	Hawaii Five-0	8 episodes
2013	Covert Affairs	1 episode
2013–2014	Person of Interest	2 episodes
2014	The Mentalist	1 episode
2014–2015	The Originals	2 episodes
2015	The Following	1 episode
2015–2017	Major Crimes	3 episodes
2015	Scorpion	1 episode
2015	Empire	1 episode
2016	Sleepy Hollow	1 episode
2016	Rush Hour	1 episode
2017	Lethal Weapon	1 episode
2017	MacGyver	1 episode
2017–2018	The Americans	2 episodes
2018	Magnum P.I.	1 episode
2018	Station 19	1 episode
2019–2021	The Rookie	6 episodes
2019	Strange Angel	1 episode
2020	Amazing Stories	1 episode
2020	Fargo	2 episodes
2020–2022	The Umbrella Academy	3 episodes
2022	Billions	1 episode
2022	Bel-Air	1 episode
2022	The Terminal List	2 episodes
2022	Reasonable Doubt	1 episode
2023	All American: Homecoming	1 episode
2023	Justified: City Primeval	1 episode
2023–2026	For All Mankind	4 episodes
2023–2024	Fargo	2 episodes
