= Karen Aldridge =

American actress

- Born: Karen Alexis Aldridge; Richmond, California, U.S.
- Education: DePaul University (MFA)
- Occupation: Actress
- Years active: 2003–present

Karen Alexis Aldridge is an American actress. She is best known for playing Mrs. Phelps in the Broadway premiere cast of Matilda the Musical, and for her television roles in Severance (2022–2025), Alien: Earth (2025), and the fourth season of the anthology series Fargo (2020).

== Biography ==
Aldridge was born in Richmond, California, and ran track in her youth. She studied sociology at UCLA and graduated with an MFA in Acting from DePaul University. In 2010, she played Iris Sparks in the world premiere of Regina Taylor's The Trinity River Plays. In 2013, she played Mrs. Phelps in the Broadway premiere cast of Matilda the Musical.

== Acting credits ==
=== Film ===
Year	Title	Role	Ref.
2004	Sandcastles	Atropos	
2011	The Dilemma	Receptionist	
2023	The Good Mother	Laurie	
2023	The Creator	Dr. Thankey	

=== Television ===
Year	Title	Role	Notes	Ref.
2011–2012	Boss	Dr. Ella Harris	10 episodes	
2012–2015	Chicago Fire	Dr. Kendra Perrington	6 episodes	
2014	Unforgettable	Ellen Hewitt	Episode: "Flesh and Blood"	
2014	Blue Bloods	Desiree Jones	Episode: "Power of the Press"	
2016	Chicago Med	Dr. Kendra Perrington	3 episodes	
2016–2017	The Get Down	Adele Kipling	6 episodes	
2020	Fargo	Zelmare Roulette	Season 4; 8 episodes	
2022–2025	Severance	Asal Reghabi	Recurring role	
2023	61st Street	Naimah Watts	5 episodes	
2025	Alien: Earth	Chibuzo	2 episodes	

=== Theater ===
Year	Title	Role	Venue	Notes	Ref.
2003	Man from Nebraska	Tamyra	Steppenwolf Theatre Company	Chicago	
2005	Splittin' the Raft	Black woman	Marin Theatre Company		
2007	Bot	Mella	Magic Theater Northside	San Francisco	
2009	Macbeth	Lady Macbeth	Chicago Shakespeare Theatre	Chicago	
2009	Twelfth Night	Olivia	Chicago Shakespeare Theatre	Chicago	
2010	The Good Negro	Corinne	Goodman Theatre	Chicago	
2011	The Trinity River Plays	Iris	Goodman Theatre	Chicago	
2011	Clybourne Park	Francine, Lena	Steppenwolf Theatre Company	Chicago	
2013	Matilda the Musical	Mrs. Phelps	Shubert Theatre	Broadway	
2014	The Qualms	Regine	Steppenwolf Theatre Company	Chicago	
2017	The Glass Menagerie	Amanda	California Shakespeare Theater		
2018	Victims of Duty	Madeleine	A Red Orchid Theatre	Chicago	
