= Salvatore Esposito (actor) =

Italian actor

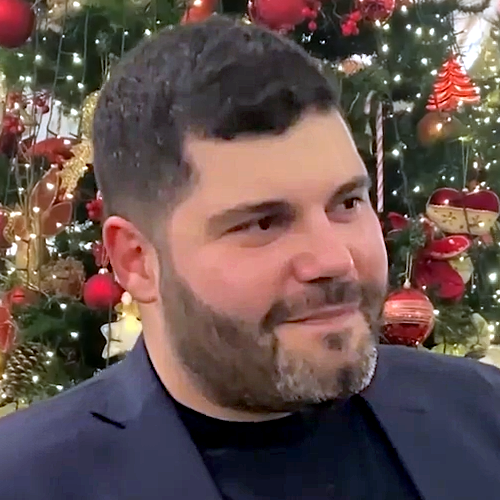
- Esposito in 2024
- Born: 2 February 1986 (age 40); Naples, Italy
- Occupation: Actor
- Years active: 2011–present

Salvatore Esposito (Italian: [salvaˈtoːre eˈspɔːzito]; born 2 February 1986) is an Italian actor. He is best known for his leading role as Gennaro "Genny" Savastano on the Sky Italia television series Gomorrah (2014–2021). In 2020, Esposito made his English-language debut, appearing in the 4th season of the American TV series Fargo. His role in the series, as intimidating Italian mobster Gaetano Fadda, was highly praised.

== Filmography ==
=== Films ===
Year	Title	Role	Notes
2012	Il principio del terzo escluso	R.O.S.	Short film
2015	Carvina	Fra	Short film
2015	They Call Me Jeeg	Vincenzo	
2015	The Bookmakers	Fighter	Short film
2016	Zeta - Una storia hip-hop	Sante	
2017	Veleno	Rino Caradonna	
2017	Addio fottuti musi verdi	Genny Falacone	
2018	My Big Gay Italian Wedding	Paolo Baiello	
2018	Nessuno è innocente	Ermanno	Short film
2018	Taxi 5	Antonio Di Biase	
2019	L'eroe	Giorgio Pollini	
2019	The Immortal	Gennaro Savastano	
2020	Spaccapietre	Giuseppe	
2022	The Perfect Dinner	Carmine Giordano	
2022	Rosanero	Totò	
2025	Den of Thieves 2: Pantera	Slavko	
2026	Maserati: The Brothers	Bindo Maserati	

=== Television ===
Year	Title	Role	Notes
2013	Il clan dei camorristi	Domenico	Main role; 8 episodes
2014–2021	Gomorrah	Gennaro Savastano	Main role; 58 episodes
2020	Fargo	Gaetano Fadda	Main role (season 4); 8 episodes
