= Kelsey Asbille =

American actress (born 1991)

- Born: Kelsey Asbille Chow; September 9, 1991 (age 35); Columbia, South Carolina, U.S.
- Other name: Kelsey Chow
- Education: Columbia University
- Occupation: Actress
- Years active: 2005–present

Kelsey Asbille Chow, (born September 9, 1991) known as her stage name Kelsey Asbille, is an American actress. In 2024, Asbille played the lead role of Iris in the Netflix movie Don't Move. She has played Mikayla in the Disney XD sitcom Pair of Kings. From 2005 to 2009, she had a recurring role as Gigi Silveri on the drama One Tree Hill. She portrayed Tracy Stewart in MTV's Teen Wolf from 2015 to 2016. Asbille had a supporting role in the film Wind River and a recurring role in the television series Fargo, and played main character Monica Long Dutton in the Paramount Network western drama series Yellowstone (2018–2024).

== Early life ==
Kelsey Asbille's father is Jim C. Chow, who served for more than 30 years in the United States Air Force and Air National Guard achieving the rank of brigadier general.

Asbille attended Hammond School in Columbia, South Carolina, for high school. She began attending Columbia University at the age of 17 as a human rights major and was still continuing with her studies as of 2023.

== Career ==
After gaining experience in community theatre, Asbille got her first television role in 2005 where she played the recurring role of Gigi Silveri on One Tree Hill at the age of 13 appearing on the show until 2009.

In 2008, she guest starred on The Suite Life of Zack & Cody. She also co-starred in the Disney Channel original film Den Brother.

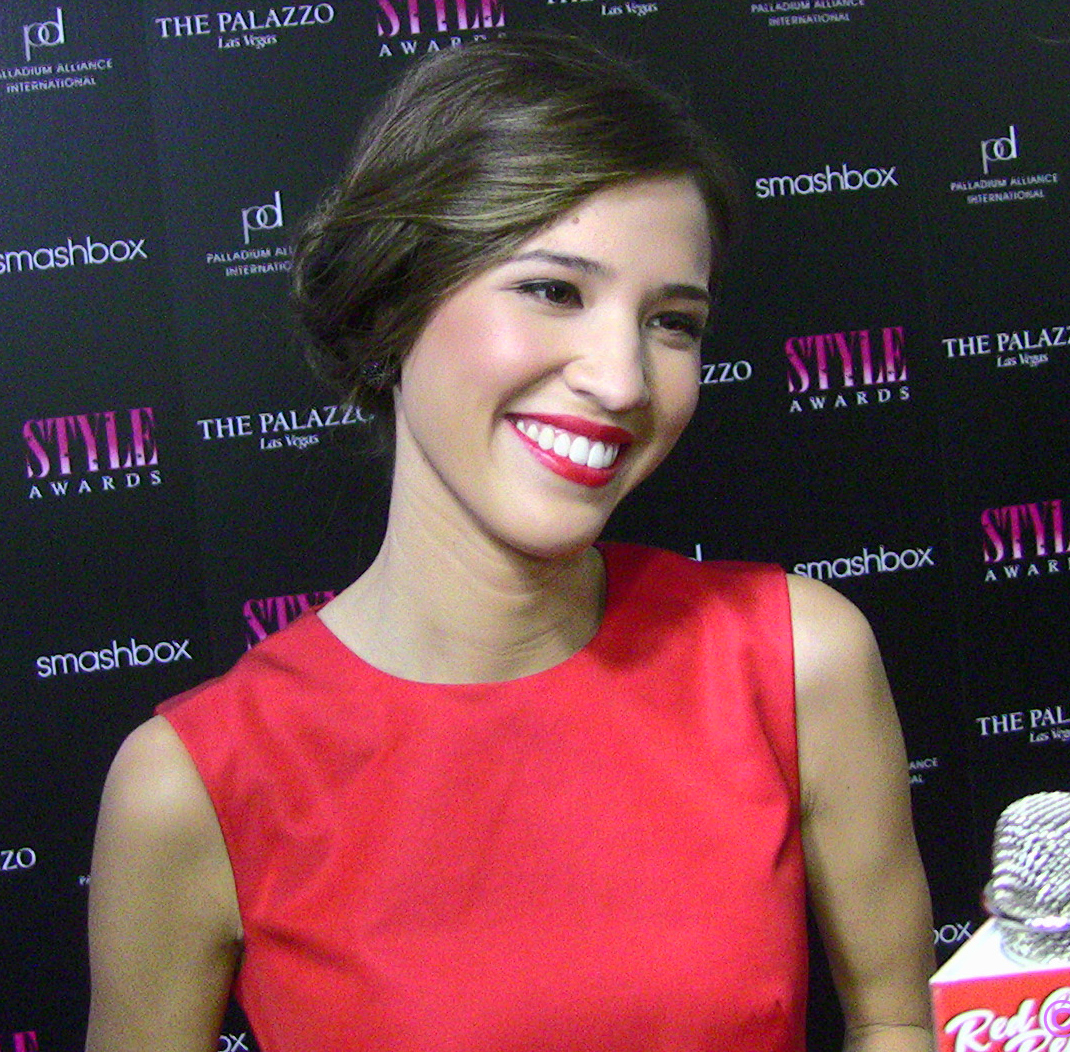
Asbille at the 2011 Hollywood Style Awards.

From 2010, Asbille played Mikayla on the Disney XD original series Pair of Kings.

In 2012, Asbille had a small part in The Amazing Spider-Man, and was later cast in the feature film Run.

In 2014, she was cast in the Fox drama Hieroglyph. However, the series was cancelled before it premiered.

She co-starred in 2015 with Stefanie Scott in the music video for Hayley Kiyoko's song "Girls Like Girls", and appeared in the recurring role of Tracy Stewart on season five of Teen Wolf (the first ten episodes premiered on June 29, 2015, while the second half premiered on January 5, 2016).

== Personal life ==
In 2017, The New York Times reported Asbille to be of Taiwanese, British, and Eastern Band Cherokee descent. She told the newspaper that playing an Indigenous woman in Wind River was "in [her] blood". Actor Adam Beach disputed her ancestry and casting in Yellowstone. In response to an inquiry by actor-producer Sonny Skyhawk, the Eastern Band of Cherokee Indians issued a statement that Asbille was not an enrolled member and that the tribe had no documentation supporting that she was descended from the band.

As of September 2026, she is engaged to Miles Joris-Peyrafitte.

== Filmography ==
=== Film ===
Year	Title	Role	Notes
2009	My Sweet Misery	Girlfriend Past	
2012	The Amazing Spider-Man	Sally Avril	Character named "Hot Girl" in credits
2013	The Wine of Summer	Brit	
2013	Run	Emily Baltimore	
2014	Found Footage	Girl	Short film
2015	Full of Grace	Zara	
2015	Chicago Sanitation	Sanitation Worker	Short film
2017	Wind River	Natalie Hanson	Credited as Kelsey Asbille
2024	Don't Move	Iris	Credited as Kelsey Asbille
TBA	The Kellys †	TBA	Filming

=== Television ===
Year	Title	Role	Notes
2005–2009	One Tree Hill	Gigi Silveri	Recurring role; 18 episodes
2008	The Suite Life of Zack & Cody	Dakota	Episode: "Romancing the Phone"
2010	Den Brother	Matisse Burrows	Disney Channel Original Movie
2010–2013	Pair of Kings	Mikayla Makoola	Main role; 63 episodes
2011	Disney's Friends for Change Games	Herself	Red Team member
2012	Punk'd	Herself	Episode: "Lucy Hale"
2014	Baby Daddy	Stephanie	Episode: "An Affair Not to Remember"
2014	Hieroglyph	Lotus Tenry	Unsold pilot
2015–2016	Teen Wolf	Tracy Stewart	Recurring role; 13 episodes
2016	Embeds	Marissa	main role; 6 episodes
2017	Brimming with Love	Allie Morgan	Television film
2018	Splitting Up Together	Charlotte	Recurring role; 2 episodes
2018–2024	Yellowstone	Monica Long Dutton	Main role; 53 episodes
2020	Fargo	Swanee Capps	Season 4, recurring role

=== Music videos ===
Year	Song	Role	Artist
2013	"Sleepwalker"	Girl	Bonnie McKee
2015	"Girls Like Girls"	Sonya	Hayley Kiyoko
