= Aporia (Fargo) =

- Fargo episode
- Episode no.: Season 3 Episode 9
- Directed by: Keith Gordon
- Written by: Noah Hawley; Bob DeLaurentis
- Cinematography by: Dana Gonzales
- Editing by: Henk Vaneeghen
- Production code: XFO03009
- Original air date: June 14, 2017
- Running time: 51 minutes

Guest appearances
- Russell Harvard as Mr. Wrench; Shea Whigham as Chief Moe Dammik; Hamish Linklater as Agent Larue Dollard; Olivia Sandoval as Winnie Lopez; Mark Forward as Donny Mashman; Mary McDonnell as Ruby Goldfarb

Episode chronology
← Previous "Who Rules the Land of Denial?"	Next → "Somebody to Love"
- Fargo (season 3)

"Aporia" is the ninth episode of the third season of the American anthology black comedy–crime drama television series Fargo. It is the 29th overall episode of the series and was written by series creator Noah Hawley and co-executive producer Bob DeLaurentis and directed by Keith Gordon. It originally aired on FX on June 14, 2017.

The season is set primarily in 2010, in three Minnesota towns: St. Cloud, Eden Valley, and Eden Prairie. It follows the lives of a couple, Ray Stussy and Nikki Swango, who, after unsuccessfully trying to rob Ray's wealthy older brother Emmit, become involved in a double murder case. One of the victims is an old man with a mysterious past whose stepdaughter, Gloria Burgle, is a policewoman. Meanwhile, Emmit tries to cut his ties with a shady organization he borrowed money from a year before, but the company, represented by V. M. Varga, has other plans. In the episode, Emmit confesses to his crimes, but Varga stages more crimes in order to exonerate him. Meanwhile, Nikki and Mr. Wrench plan their next move.

According to Nielsen Media Research, the episode was seen by an estimated 1.19 million household viewers and gained a 0.3 ratings share among adults aged 18–49. The episode received critical acclaim, with critics praising the directing, character development, performances, and pacing.

== Plot ==
At the police station, Emmit (Ewan McGregor) tells Gloria (Carrie Coon) about his childhood, explaining how he manipulated Ray into getting the Corvette while he kept the stamps, which he used to start Stussy Lots. He also confesses to killing Ray while visiting his apartment, deeming it an accident.

Meemo (Andy Yu) kills a man named Marvin Stussy in St. Cloud. Later, Varga (David Thewlis) orders him to retrieve Emmit from the police station after he takes one of his trucks for its destination. However, the truck is ambushed by Nikki (Mary Elizabeth Winstead) and Mr. Wrench (Russell Harvard), who fool Meemo with a fake grenade and steal their truck. Having stolen vital financial information, Nikki contacts Varga to demand $2 million, revealing that she has access to his secret accounts. They both agree to a meeting.

While Gloria calls Winnie (Olivia Sandoval) about Emmit's confession, she is informed of Marvin Stussy's death. Later, the police are called to another murder, a man named George Stussy, who was murdered in a similar manner as Ennis Stussy. The police track an ex-con named Donny Woo, who confesses to having killed Marvin, George, Ray and Ennis, claiming that his stepfather molested him and enacted revenge. With this confession, Chief Dimmik (Shea Whigham) orders Emmit's release, dismissing his confession as a guilt complex. This annoys Gloria, who also questioned the alibi that Ruby Goldfarb (Mary McDonnell) provided.

Varga meets with Nikki at a hotel, failing to poison her with the tea or hiring her as part of his team. Mr. Wrench also holds Meemo at gunpoint, leaving Varga with no protection. Nikki gives him 24 hours to pay the $2 million, threatening to send Emmit's and Varga's financial records to the IRS. At the police station, Gloria informs Emmit about his release and the other murders. Despite his attempts to protest, she tells him he must leave. He is then placed in a car with Varga while a distraught Gloria is comforted by Winnie at a bar. Later, Agent Dollard (Hamish Linklater) arrives at his office, finding an envelope that contains a USB drive and the financial records for Stussy Lots.

== Production ==
=== Development ===
In May 2017, it was reported that the ninth episode of the season would be titled "Aporia", and was to be directed by Keith Gordon and written by series creator Noah Hawley and co-executive producer Bob DeLaurentis. This was Hawley's 22nd writing credit, DeLaurentis' fourth writing credit, and Gordon's third directing credit.

== Reception ==
=== Viewers ===
In its original American broadcast, "Aporia" was seen by an estimated 1.19 million household viewers and gained a 0.3 ratings share among adults aged 18–49, according to Nielsen Media Research. This means that 0.3 percent of all households with televisions watched the episode. This was a 4% increase in viewership from the previous episode, which was watched by 1.14 million viewers with a 0.3 in the 18-49 demographics.

=== Critical reviews ===
"Aporia" received critical acclaim. The review aggregator website Rotten Tomatoes reported a 93% approval rating with an average rating of 8.1/10 for the episode, based on 15 reviews. The site's consensus states: "'Aporia' sets the table for Fargo's season 3 finale - and offers a glimmer of uplift on the show's predominantly dark canvas."

Matt Fowler of IGN gave the episode an "amazing" 9 out of 10 and wrote in his verdict, "Part of me wishes Gloria didn't give voice to so much of her seasonal inner turmoil at the end since it didn't feel necessary, this far in, to explain the things most of us had gathered over the past nine episodes, but overall the combination of her and Emmit's attempt to do "good" and the subsequent wretched actions of Varga squashing the truth made for one hell of an emotional ride. On top of that, Nikki and Wrench make a badass duo who gave us more than a few crowd-pleasing moments this week."

Zack Handlen of The A.V. Club gave the episode an "A" grade and wrote, "'Aporia' does a good job of putting everyone where they need to be, and providing clear objectives as we head towards the end."

Alan Sepinwall of Uproxx wrote, "'Aporia', though, had that same thrilling feeling of everything coming together that we got at this rough point in prior years, while also making several key players feel more complex, sympathetic, and just plain human than before." Ben Travers of IndieWire gave the episode an "A" grade and wrote, "With only an hour left, Season 3 remains a tad predictable and a touch redundant overall, but Episode 9 was a particularly stirring, enlightening, and rewarding hour of television."

Kevin P. Sullivan of Entertainment Weekly gave the episode a "B+" grade wrote, "Nothing says "Midwestern crime" quite like the image of a streak of blood in pooling spilled milk." Brian Tallerico of Vulture gave the episode a 4 star rating out of 5 and wrote, "Perhaps that's why this season of Fargo has felt so much more somber than the others - because its version of good isn't just ignored and dismissed, but totally invisible. And then we get a glimpse of hope." Nick Harley of Den of Geek gave the episode a 4.5 star rating out of 5 and wrote, "So maybe the episode ended with a transfer of files instead of a shootout. That's fine; the time spent listening to Emmit and Gloria talk about their feelings and watching Nikki and Varga play Chicken is golden without any chaotic violence. It's something of a quiet penultimate episode, but one of the more thoughtful episodes of the season. If next week's finale brings the heart like this and amps up the action a bit, there'll be nothing to complain about."

Scott Tobias of The New York Times wrote, "This is the third Fargo episode by Gordon, and he adds some beautiful touches here and there." Caralynn Lippo of TV Fanatic gave the episode a 4.5 star rating out of 5 and wrote, "'Aporia' saw the return of Nikki and Mr. Wrench post time-jump. Meanwhile, the confession that Emmit was set to make at the end of 'Who Rules the Land of Denial?' unfortunately became null and void rather quickly." Kyle Fowle of Paste gave the episode an 8.5 rating out of 10 and wrote, "While Fargo doesn't always hit its mark, there's a feminist reading to be made here, and it's a reading that's developed as the season has gone on."

=== Accolades ===
TVLine named Olivia Sandoval as an honorable mention as the "Performer of the Week" for the week of June 17, 2017, for her performance in the episode. The site wrote, "It's kind of a shame that each season of Fargo is a self-contained story, because that means we won't get to see much more of Olivia Sandoval's terrific work as Minnesota traffic cop Winnie Lopez. The newcomer has been a delight as the plainspoken Winnie, using her Midwestern common sense to help Gloria crack the Emmit Stussy case. And this week's bar scene was a Winnie highlight, with Sandoval playing Winnie's fertility overshares for laughs and also delivering a genuinely touching moment, as Winnie wrapped up Gloria in a warm hug to remind her she does exist, and people aren't all bad. 'I like ya', Winnie told Gloria. Right back atcha, Ms. Sandoval."
