= Who Rules the Land of Denial? =

- Fargo episode
- Episode no.: Season 3 Episode 8
- Directed by: Mike Barker
- Written by: Noah Hawley; Monica Beletsky
- Cinematography by: Craig Wrobleski
- Editing by: Andrew Seklir
- Production code: XFO03008
- Original air date: June 7, 2017
- Running time: 52 minutes

Guest appearances
- Michael Stuhlbarg as Sy Feltz; Russell Harvard as Mr. Wrench; Ray Wise as Paul Marrane; Mark Forward as Donny Mashman; Olivia Sandoval as Winnie Lopez; DJ Qualls as Golem

Episode chronology
← Previous "The Law of Inevitability"	Next → "Aporia"
- Fargo (season 3)

"Who Rules the Land of Denial?" is the eighth episode of the third season of the American anthology black comedy–crime drama television series Fargo. It is the 28th overall episode of the series and was written by series creator Noah Hawley and supervising producer Monica Beletsky and directed by Mike Barker. It originally aired on FX on June 7, 2017.

The season is set primarily in 2010, in three Minnesota towns: St. Cloud, Eden Valley, and Eden Prairie. It follows the lives of a couple, Ray Stussy and Nikki Swango, who, after unsuccessfully trying to rob Ray's wealthy older brother Emmit, become involved in a double murder case. One of the victims is an old man with a mysterious past whose stepdaughter, Gloria Burgle, is a policewoman. Meanwhile, Emmit tries to cut his ties with a shady organization he borrowed money from a year before, but the company, represented by V. M. Varga, has other plans. In the episode, Nikki and Mr. Wrench escape from the prison bus and flee into the woods to avoid Varga's henchmen from killing them. Meanwhile, Emmit's life continues spiraling while he feels strange events at his life.

According to Nielsen Media Research, the episode was seen by an estimated 1.14 million household viewers and gained a 0.3 ratings share among adults aged 18–49. The episode received extremely positive reviews from critics, who praised the tension, writing, character development and messages.

== Plot ==
Yuri (Goran Bogdan), Meemo (Andy Yu) and Golem (DJ Qualls) intercept the prison bus by placing a ramp in the road, causing it to crash. As they make their way through the prison bus, Nikki (Mary Elizabeth Winstead) and Mr. Wrench (Russell Harvard) break free from their seats, although they remain shackled to each other. Mr. Wrench holds off Golem from attacking them, allowing them to escape through the exit door and fleeing into the woods. As Yuri, Meemo and Golem leave the bus, a car passes by and sees their faces, forcing Meemo to drive after and kill the witnesses.

As they make their way through the woods, they are being followed by Yuri and Golem, with Yuri acquiring a crossbow after killing a father and son. By the next day, Nikki and Mr. Wrench find an ax and try to break their chain, until they are discovered by them, with both being hit by arrows. Sensing Yuri in the woods, Mr. Wrench throws his ax at him, cutting off his ear, and they use their chain to behead Golem. After breaking their chain, Nikki and Mr. Wrench manage to leave the woods and enter a bowling alley. While ordering at a counter, she meets Paul Marrane (Ray Wise). Marrane shows her a kitten, which he named Ray, also using the concept of gilgul to signify a kind of reincarnation. He tells her that she should use all her power to fight the evil in the world and grants her a car. Nikki and Mr. Wrench use the car to flee. After they leave, a wounded Yuri enters the bowling alley, where Marrane tells him he has a message for him from Helga Albrecht, revealing that this Yuri is the same as the one referenced in the first episode.

On Christmas Day, Gloria (Carrie Coon) is called to the witnesses' deaths and the prison bus incident, noting that Nikki wasn't seen in the scene. Meanwhile, Sy (Michael Stuhlbarg) visits Emmit (Ewan McGregor), only to find Varga (David Thewlis) and Meemo at his house. While talking with Varga, Sy is served a tea, while Emmit does not even acknowledge him. Back at Stussy Lots, Sy vomits, revealing that he was poisoned and is taken to the hospital, where he falls into a coma.

In March 2011, Sy is still in a coma. Emmit constantly visits him, while Gloria (now demoted to Deputy) and Winnie (Olivia Sandoval) try to question him as his business suddenly expanded. Emmit starts seeing weird events in his life: His car is stolen and replaced with his brother's Corvette, his office is now filled with portraits of the stamp, and waking up with a fake mustache while sleeping. He calls Varga for help, but he rebuffs his claim that an alive Ray and Nikki are involved. Feeling that Emmit's paranoia won't allow them to keep their partnership in place, Varga gives him a tranquilizer to calm him. However, Emmit is revealed to have faked taking it. He arrives at the police station, explaining that he is confessing.

== Production ==
=== Development ===
In May 2017, it was reported that the eighth episode of the season would be titled "Who Rules the Land of Denial?", and was to be directed by Mike Barker and written by series creator Noah Hawley and supervising producer Monica Beletsky. This was Hawley's 21st writing credit, Beletsky's second writing credit, and Barker's second directing credit.

== Reception ==
=== Viewers ===
In its original American broadcast, "Who Rules the Land of Denial?" was seen by an estimated 1.14 million household viewers and gained a 0.3 ratings share among adults aged 18–49, according to Nielsen Media Research. This means that 0.3 percent of all households with televisions watched the episode. This was a 10% increase in viewership from the previous episode, which was watched by 1.03 million viewers with a 0.3 in the 18-49 demographics.

=== Critical reviews ===
"Who Rules the Land of Denial?" received extremely positive reviews from critics. The review aggregator website Rotten Tomatoes reported an 87% approval rating with an average rating of 8.3/10 for the episode, based on 15 reviews. The site's consensus states: "'Who Rules the Land of Denial?' offers gripping evidence that even when it's in something of a holding pattern, Fargo remains queasily compelling."

Matt Fowler of IGN gave the episode an "amazing" 9.6 out of 10 and wrote in his verdict, "'Who Rules the Land of Denial?' was, probably, the scariest Fargo episode to date, filled from front to finish with nightmarish imagery and horrifying concepts that, at times, pushed the edges of the cosmic envelope. Murders, maulings, poisonings and penance - this tremendous chapter saw Nikki prevail, Sy fall, and Emmit succumb to guilt."

Zack Handlen of The A.V. Club gave the episode a "B" grade and wrote, "I wouldn't say I was ever precisely bored by any of it. But I'm not sure this all adds up to anything beyond narrative flailing - frequently memorable and entertaining flailing, to be sure, but flailing nonetheless."

Alan Sepinwall of Uproxx wrote, "This season is still disappointing in some ways, mainly because a number of characters (the Stussy brothers in particular) don't feel as fleshed-out and human as their counterparts from previous years, but a show capable of those two bowling alley scenes is a show I will roll with for a very long time — on Shabbos or otherwise." Ben Travers of IndieWire gave the episode a "B-" grade and wrote, "Eight hours is too long to be trying to light a match."

Kevin P. Sullivan of Entertainment Weekly gave the episode a "B+" grade wrote, "It was pretty much everything that we could want from an episode of Fargo, which is a great thing from a season that has been missing the energy of previous installments." Brian Tallerico of Vulture gave the episode a 4 star rating out of 5 and wrote, "No other show on television blends influences quite like Fargo." Nick Harley of Den of Geek gave the episode a 4 star rating out of 5 wrote, "After last week's light offering, this week felt substantial and sets the season up well for its final two episodes. I especially liked this week's Coen homages. [...] It will be interesting to see if Fargo will veer into courtroom drama territory or if Varga will dispatch of Emmit before he gets them both in trouble. Also, Nikki is still out there plotting her revenge; will she be able to get to Emmit if he's in a holding cell? I just hope my poor guy Sy wakes up."

Scott Tobias of The New York Times wrote, "Human pettiness and greed result in serious collateral damage." Caralynn Lippo of TV Fanatic gave the episode a perfect 5 star rating out of 5 and wrote, "Atmospheric and impeccably directed, I think it's safe to say that 'Who Rules the Land of Denial?' was one of my favorite installments of the season – and perhaps of the series as a whole." Kyle Fowle of Paste gave the episode an 8.8 rating out of 10 and wrote, "I mention this season's troubles because 'Who Rules the Land of Denial?' is by far its most compelling and ambitious episode."

=== Analysis ===
"Though thou exalt thyself like the eagle, thou make thy nest among the stars, thence will I bring thee down, sayeth the Lord."

— Paul Marrane reciting the Biblical passage, Obadiah 1:4.

The episode featured the return of Ray Wise as Paul Marrane, previously seen in "The Law of Non-Contradiction". The scene featured Marrane explaining the story of Job, the concept of Gilgul, and his request that Nikki should use her power to fight the evil in the world. Noah Hawley explained that the scene was about "exploring the idea of cosmic justice because we were clearly going to see the limitations of human justice."

Marrane has been theorized to be the Wandering Jew, a Jew who taunted Jesus on the way to the Crucifixion who was then cursed to walk the Earth until the Second Coming. A basis included his name, which was referred in Letters Writ by a Turkish Spy. IGN viewed Marrane as "some sort of vengeful deity looking for mortal partners to help him deliver a message to the wicked. Something or someone stemming from Soviet Eastern Block mythology, in search of righteous revenge." Alan Sepinwall wrote, "Jewish tradition is mixed on the existence of an afterlife, but the Book of Judgment to which Paul alludes is very familiar to any Member of the Tribe who's sat through Yom Kippur services, and Paul speaks with eloquence and passion about the teachings of Hasidic trailblazer Rabbi Nachman, and about the Cossack massacre of the Jews of Uman, and later jokes that giving Nikki and Wrench a VW Beetle to drive away in is 'the universe at its most ironic.'"

Many critics also pointed out the similarities with another film from the Coen brothers, The Big Lebowski, including setting the scene at a bowling alley, with Ray Wise acting as Sam Elliott's role in the film. TheWrap characterized the scene as "a meeting with a supernatural being, one ready to spirit various Fargo characters away to the afterlife." Entertainment Weekly compared Wise to Elliott's role, "Marrane seems to exist outside the world of the story, knowing that what they're living in is a story. He's less human here, and his perspective has taken an even more godlike position, arming him with a kitten that might be the reincarnation of Ray."
