= The Law of Inevitability =

- Fargo episode
- Episode no.: Season 3 Episode 7
- Directed by: Mike Barker
- Written by: Noah Hawley; Matt Wolpert; Ben Nedivi
- Cinematography by: Craig Wrobleski
- Editing by: Curtis Thurber
- Production code: XFO03007
- Original air date: May 31, 2017
- Running time: 46 minutes

Guest appearances
- Michael Stuhlbarg as Sy Feltz; Russell Harvard as Mr. Wrench; Shea Whigham as Chief Moe Dammik; Mark Forward as Donny Mashman; Olivia Sandoval as Winnie Lopez; DJ Qualls as Golem; Mary McDonnell as Ruby Goldfarb

Episode chronology
← Previous "The Lord of No Mercy"	Next → "Who Rules the Land of Denial?"
- Fargo (season 3)

"The Law of Inevitability" is the seventh episode of the third season of the American anthology black comedy–crime drama television series Fargo. It is the 27th overall episode of the series and was written by series creator Noah Hawley and co-executive producers Matt Wolpert and Ben Nedivi and directed by Mike Barker. It originally aired on FX on May 31, 2017.

The season is set primarily in 2010, in three Minnesota towns: St. Cloud, Eden Valley, and Eden Prairie. It follows the lives of a couple, Ray Stussy and Nikki Swango, who, after unsuccessfully trying to rob Ray's wealthy older brother Emmit, become involved in a double murder case. One of the victims is an old man with a mysterious past whose stepdaughter, Gloria Burgle, is a policewoman. Meanwhile, Emmit tries to cut his ties with a shady organization he borrowed money from a year before, but the company, represented by V. M. Varga, has other plans. In the episode, Nikki is arrested for Ray's murder, while Emmit and Sy's friendship starts falling apart.

According to Nielsen Media Research, the episode was seen by an estimated 1.03 million household viewers and gained a 0.3 ratings share among adults aged 18–49. The episode received extremely positive reviews from critics, who praised the performances, character development and directing. Mr. Wrench's return, however, divided critics; some found it refreshing and interesting, while others deemed it unnecessary and not fitting within the season's context.

== Plot ==
Gloria (Carrie Coon) and Winnie (Olivia Sandoval) find Ray (Ewan McGregor) dead in his apartment. The police later arrests Nikki (Mary Elizabeth Winstead) at her motel room after she failed to escape through a window. She is taken to the St. Cloud's police station, where she is informed by Chief Dammik (Shea Whigham) of Ray's death and her suspected role in his death. Nikki refuses to cooperate and requests a lawyer, but is clearly affected by Ray's death.

Winnie is ordered to return to traffic duty, while Dammik tells Gloria to stop trying to pursue the case as it has fallen out of jurisdiction. In Eden Valley, Gloria's partner, Donny (Mark Forward), finds Yuri (Goran Bogdan) stealing Ennis Stussy's file. Yuri threatens him and leaves the place with the file. Emmit (McGregor) meets with Sy (Michael Stuhlbarg) and Ruby Goldfarb (Mary McDonnell) for dinner. However, his trauma at Ray's death almost ruins it. The dinner is also interrupted when Winnie talks with Emmit to inform him of Ray's death. Emmit acts very defensive and suggests Nikki was involved. Sy takes Emmit out of the restaurant, while Winnie decides to question Ruby.

Sy drives Emmit home, suggesting that they should get rid of Varga (David Thewlis) by selling Stussy Lots. Emmit gets even more defensive, accusing Sy of working with Ray, which he denies. Emmit is not convinced and leaves without further talking with Sy. Sy then sees that Varga has been staring at them, inside from Emmit's house. When Varga questions Emmit on how he feels, Emmit says "free", but clearly remains devastated. Sy returns home to his wife, where he cries, stating "the world is wrong".

Gloria attempts to interrogate Nikki, but the department policies prevent her from filing the form necessary to do so without the Chief's approval. At her cell, Nikki is approached by a police officer, who turns out to be a hitman named Golem (DJ Qualls) working for Varga. Gloria enters the room and holds him off, but the man manages to escape while she is reprimanded by the officers and Dimmik for entering without a form. To make things worse, security footage is sabotaged. While questioned by the police, Nikki only says that the police need to follow the money. For violating probation, Nikki is placed in a prison bus. In the bus, she is placed next to Mr. Wrench (Russell Harvard). As the bus takes its route, the driver gets distracted when Yuri appears on the road, causing it to crash. Nikki loses consciousness while Yuri and his men work to make their way through the bus.

== Production ==
=== Development ===
In May 2017, it was reported that the seventh episode of the season would be titled "The Law of Inevitability", and was to be directed by Mike Barker and written by series creator Noah Hawley, and co-executive producers Matt Wolpert and Ben Nedivi. This was Hawley's 20th writing credit, Wolpert's fourth writing credit, Nedivi's fourth writing credit, and Barker's first directing credit.

=== Casting ===
The episode featured the return of Russell Harvard as Mr. Wrench, who was last seen in "The Heap", although a younger version of the character appeared in "Palindrome". Series creator Noah Hawley explained, "We wanted this season to stand on its own two feet; the first and second seasons were Molly's story and then Molly's origin story. This season is set in 2010, after the 2008 financial crisis, and as a result only a couple of characters could connect... and it felt really organic to me to say that in that seventh hour, when Nikki was at her lowest point and gets on that prison bus, and the audience thinks, 'We're losing Nikki and we hate this show' — cue the sad piano music — that we track over and find Mr. Wrench and that beat kicks in." Hawley also explained that as he was considering which character would come back, the only options were Molly Solverson, Gus Grimly and Mr. Wrench. As the writers never found fitting why Molly or Gus would fit in the storyline, Mr. Wrench was selected.

== Reception ==
=== Viewers ===
In its original American broadcast, "The Law of Inevitability" was seen by an estimated 1.03 million household viewers and gained a 0.3 ratings share among adults aged 18–49, according to Nielsen Media Research. This means that 0.3 percent of all households with televisions watched the episode. This was a slight decrease in viewership from the previous episode, which was watched by 1.04 million viewers with a 0.2 in the 18-49 demographics.

=== Critical reviews ===
"The Law of Inevitability" received extremely positive reviews from critics. The review aggregator website Rotten Tomatoes reported a 100% approval rating with an average rating of 8.1/10 for the episode, based on 13 reviews. The site's consensus states: "'The Law of Inevitability' continues Fargo's third-season dive into darkness, with typically solid acting anchoring the story's grimly satisfying turns."

Matt Fowler of IGN gave the episode a "great" 8.4 out of 10 and wrote in his verdict, "Despite multiple attempts on Nikki's life, and a fun, perhaps game-changing, shot of Mr. Wrench on the bus at the end, Fargo simmered down a bit this week for a Christmas Eve episodes all about Gloria making pain-staking progress in her frowned-upon investigation."

Zack Handlen of The A.V. Club gave the episode an "A-" grade and wrote, "There's a growing sense of doom throughout 'The Law Of Inevitability,' that marvellous, agonizing feeling that everything is starting to fall apart."

Alan Sepinwall of Uproxx wrote, "We'll have to wait and see if this is just a tip of the cap to previous installments or if Wrench will somehow help Nikki survive the coming assault of Yuri and company aboard the wrecked prison bus. But seeing Wrench again only drove home how many of this season's characters and moments are echoes of Fargo's first year." Ben Travers of IndieWire gave the episode a "B" grade and wrote, "Year 3 can be as dark as it wants, as long as there's a greater purpose. But with only three episodes left, we need more consistency if the ending of this symphonic fairy tale is going to come together."

Kevin P. Sullivan of Entertainment Weekly gave the episode a "B+" grade wrote, "The stakes are higher. The emotions seem more real. And there's a central crime that hasn't already been solved by Gloria." Brian Tallerico of Vulture gave the episode a 4 star rating out of 5 and wrote, "Patriarchy, idiocy, murder: It's another solid episode of Fargo." Nick Harley of Den of Geek gave the episode a 4 star rating out of 5 wrote, "Though it wasn't the most thrilling hour of the season, there were several engaging scenes powered by nothing more than solid performances. With only three episodes left, I wouldn't expect the episodes moving forward to have such a mellow pace. Nikki will have to fight her way out of a tight situation and the walls are slowly but surely caving in on Emmit, but I guess that was inevitable."

Scott Tobias of The New York Times wrote, "This week's episode keeps moving the plot forward effectively, but what continues to be notable about this season is that Gloria would probably have the case wrapped up if she weren't held back by so many obstacles." Caralynn Lippo of TV Fanatic gave the episode a 4.25 star rating out of 5 and wrote, "'The Law of Inevitability' dealt with the fallout from Ray's accidental death, which sent ripple effects unbalancing virtually every character on the show." Kyle Fowle of Paste gave the episode a 7.2 rating out of 10 and wrote, "In this look at culpability and personal responsibility is the potential for a critique of privilege and the social blindness it creates."
