= The Narrow Escape Problem =

- Fargo episode
- The episode introduces Olivia Sandoval as policewoman Winnie Lopez.
- Episode no.: Season 3 Episode 4
- Directed by: Michael Uppendahl
- Written by: Monica Beletsky
- Narrated by: Billy Bob Thornton
- Production code: XFO03004
- Original air date: May 10, 2017
- Running time: 48 minutes

Guest appearances
- Michael Stuhlbarg as Sy Feltz; Shea Whigham as Chief Moe Dammik; Scoot McNairy as Maurice LeFay; Olivia Sandoval as Winnie Lopez; Linda Kash as Stella Stussy

Episode chronology
← Previous "The Law of Non-Contradiction"	Next → "The House of Special Purpose"
- Fargo season 3

"The Narrow Escape Problem" is the fourth episode of the third season of the FX anthology series Fargo, and the twenty-fourth episode of the series overall. It was directed by Michael Uppendahl, and written by series executive producer Monica Beletsky. The title refers to the eponymous problem in biology, biophysics and cellular biology.

In the episode, Ray Stussy (Ewan McGregor) impersonates his brother Emmit, withdrawing $10,000 from Emmit's bank account, but has to face the consequences, while Emmit (also played by McGregor)'s involvement with the mysterious organization represented by V. M. Varga (David Thewlis) runs deeper than ever before. Meanwhile, still investigating the murder of her stepfather, Gloria Burgle (Carrie Coon) meets fellow policewoman Winnie Lopez (Olivia Sandoval), who, unbeknown to both, might prove herself a key element of her investigation.

"The Narrow Escape Problem" was first aired on May 10, 2017, and was seen by 1.05 million viewers. It makes use of Sergei Prokofiev's Peter and the Wolf.

== Plot ==
At Nikki's suggestion, Ray impersonates Emmit so he can retrieve a safety deposit box, believing it contains their father's rare stamp. He intimidates Emmit's banker into giving him the box and allowing him to withdraw $10,000, but discovers the box contains the ashes of Emmit's dead dog. Later, as revenge for the theft, Sy gives Ray's bosses photographic evidence of his improper relationship with Nikki. When they confront Ray, he expresses his love for her and is fired. Despondent, Ray forgets a meeting with Nikki and a wealthy backer she hopes will bankroll them on the bridge circuit, ruining their chances.

Learning of Ray's theft, and suspecting Varga was involved in Irv's death, Emmit and Sy consider selling their company. Things escalate when Varga shows up unannounced for dinner at Emmit's house. After dinner, Varga proposes to sign Emmit on as a business partner. Although Emmit is reluctant, Varga convinces him that signing will allow him to become much richer and ensure his wealth is protected; Emmit ultimately complies.

Gloria investigates the death of Maurice LeFay, but her superior, Chief Moe Dammik, believes that she is overthinking the case. However, Gloria discovers Ray's business card in LeFay's wallet and goes to his office in St. Cloud. In the restroom, she meets Winnie Lopez, a cop who is investigating hit and run damage caused by Sy when he rammed Ray's Corvette. When Gloria meets Ray, she is very surprised to discover he has the same family name as her murdered stepfather.

Winnie visits Emmit's office and interviews Sy about the hit and run incident. Sy is extremely anxious as Varga's henchmen are watching them in the next room. Later that night, Winnie visits Gloria, having made the same connections between the shared last name, Ray and Emmit, Sy's hit and run, and the fact that the name of the town Emmit lives in, Eden Prairie, shares a similar name with Eden Valley, where Ennis lived and was killed.

== Production ==
=== Casting ===
The episode features Billy Bob Thornton, who portrayed Lorne Malvo in the first season of the show, as the narrator of Peter and the Wolf. Previously, Martin Freeman, using his own natural English accent, provided the voice-over in an episode of season 2. It also introduces Olivia Sandoval as Winnie Lopez.

=== Music ===
The music for the episode was provided by series composer Jeff Russo. It also features the theme of the original film by Carter Burwell, re-arranged by Russo. The song "You Don't Know" by Galactic is featured during the end credits.

The episode incorporates musical themes from Sergei Prokofiev's musical fairytale Peter and the Wolf.

== Reception ==
=== Ratings ===
The episode was first aired in the US on FX on May 10, 2017, and was seen by 1.05 million viewers.

=== Critical reception ===
The Narrow Escape Problem holds a 100% rating on Rotten Tomatoes, with the consensus being "'Narrow Escape Problem' savvily sets the table for subsequent episodes with strong performances, compelling characters, and a satisfying, unexpected callback to Fargo's past."

Ben Travers of IndieWire gave the episode a B+ rating and was very enthusiastic about McGregor's dual performances, stating "the very idea of Ewan McGregor playing Ray Stussy playing Emmit Stussy is too clever to pass up. You’re taking an actor already playing twins [sic] and asking him to pretend to be one twin [sic] as the other twin [sic] [...] It’s two performances in one, and three performances in total for McGregor. We love the idea of it, but we love the execution more. McGregor still had to be so deeply aware of both characters that he’d understand Ray’s perception of Emmit: how they differ, how they’re alike, what he’d say and do when pushed. It all came through in McGregor’s brash but false confidence. Just like the wig, we could see the difference between what’s real and what’s fake, but the 'Fargo' citizens couldn’t." He also praised the use of Peter and the Wolf and Thornton's voiceover, and how the episode seemed to raise the season's stakes, stating "now we’re ready to see the fireworks. That’s a lot of pressure for Episode 5, but we still feel safe in Noah Hawley’s hands. Our hair wasn’t prickling in fear, but anticipation. Next week is going to be good".

Brian Tallerico of Vulture gave the episode a four out of five rating, highly praising the characters of Chief Moe Dammick and Winnie Lopez. He did however express concern at the lack of marking events so far this season, stating "hardly anything has happened since that air conditioner fell on Maurice. It feels like Noah Hawley is purposefully working a more deliberate opening act, but I’m hoping for a shocking turn of events next week to really start the fire."

Despite calling the episode "the weakest of season 3 to this point", Vinnie Mancuso of the New York Observer gave a positive review, stating that "it did serve to bring us closer to some kind of nasty, unpleasant result, the endgame of an enigmatic criminal with an eating disorder, whatever that may be." He highly praised the performances of McGregor, Thewlis, Thornton, and Olivia Sandoval, calling the latter's a "scene-stealing debut" and "a pure delight". He also called Sy Feltz "the best character on TV right now". Noel Murray of Rolling Stone gave a positive review, highly praising the character V. M. Varga.

Scott Tobias of The New York Times gave a positive review, praising the use of Peter and the Wolf, Ray's character development and Olivia Sandoval's performance and character. He did, however, criticize the lack of depth of the season, stating "Each season of the show has gotten progressively more confident in spinning its byzantine tales of crime and human folly in [Minnesota]. But there’s a one-dimensionality to this go-round that hasn’t been worked out, even after last week’s necessary tour of the red-herring factory. Reducing the characters to their representative character-instruments in Prokofiev doesn’t exactly help to add depth, though the trade-off is cleverness for its own sake, which isn’t the worst outcome." Kevin P. Sullivan of Entertainment Weekly gave the episode a B− rating. He highly praised the new character of Winnie Lopez, and the performances of Thewlis, Michael Stuhlbarg, and McGregor. He was unconvinced, however, by its use of Peter and the Wolf, but added "Two weeks from now, we all may be marveling at the genius of the Peter and the Wolf parallel. That’s part of the problem with discussing a highly serialized, highly stylized show on a weekly basis".

Zack Handlen of The A.V. Club praised the episode for its use of Peter and the Wolf, its story development, the performances of McGregor and Thewlis, and Winnie Lopez's scenes. He however stated "there’s not a lot of excitement to watching these events, however well-structured they may be, play out. [...] Neither Ray nor Emmit have much depth as individuals—they aren’t badly written, but they aren’t so interesting in and of themselves that we care about what happens to them apart from the novelty of their situation. As a result, too much of this plays like the boring stuff you need to get through to get to what actually matters, which isn’t a great look for a one-season story that’s nearly halfway over."

=== Analysis ===
==== Peter and the Wolf ====
“Each character in the tale is going to be represented by a different instrument of the orchestra. For instance, the bird will be played by the flute. Like this. Here's the duck, played by the oboe. The cat by the clarinet. The bassoon will represent grandfather. The blast of the hunters' shotguns played by the kettledrums. The wolf by the French horns. And Peter by the strings. Are you sitting comfortably? Good. Then I'll begin."

— Billy Bob Thornton introduces Peter and the Wolf, explaining the character represented by each instrument.

This episode draws on Sergei Prokofiev's musical tale Peter and the Wolf. In the episode, the narrator, Billy Bob Thornton, explains to the audience what characters are represented by which instruments, as the episode links each Peter and the Wolf character to an equivalent Fargo character: Emmit Stussy as the bird (flute), Ray Stussy as the duck (oboe), Nikki Swango as the cat (clarinet), Sy Feltz as the grandfather (bassoon), Yuri Gurka as the gunshots of the hunters (kettledrums), V. M. Varga as the wolf (French horns), and Gloria Burgle as Peter (strings); Russo occasionally wove the associated musical theme for each character into the episode's original score.

Vinnie Mancuso of the New York Observer noted how, during the last scene between Emmit and Varga, the score features a French horn, showing that in this situation, Varga is being a wolf and a predator. He also considered Thornton's final line, “Boys like Peter aren’t afraid of wolves", as "the most important" of them. Ben Travers of IndieWire stated "In Prokofiev’s fairy tale, Peter (Gloria) is locked in the backyard by his Grandfather (Sy), and a wolf (Varga) does come. The cat (Nikki) escapes, but the duck (Ray) is eaten. Peter then uses the bird (Emmit) to distract the wolf and captures it. Now, I find it doubtful this is exactly how Season 3 plays out". He also stated “'Boys like Peter aren’t afraid of wolves,' Billy Bob Thornton says in his final voiceover. The missing subtext? 'Maybe they should be.'"

Brian Tallerico of Vulture commented, "Who are the wolves of Fargo this season? 'The Narrow Escape Problem' is comprised mostly of scenes of predator and prey sitting across from each other, one person in a position of power and the other trying to wriggle their way out: Ray and Gloria, Ray and his bosses, Sy and Winnie, Gloria and the new chief, Ray and his boss, and Emmit and V.M. In each of the scenes, there’s a sense of the hunt, a character pressuring another, and even the thrill of a 'narrow escape'.

Scott Tobias of The New York Times criticized the choices of Nikki as the cat and Sy as the grandfather, stating: "The Grandfather, at least in this episode, would be more aptly represented by Chief Moe Dammick, who warns Peter/Gloria about the dangers of 'overcomplicating' a case that’s more simply explained as a drug addict killing for his next fix. When Billy Bob Thornton’s narrator nods to Prokofiev toward the end — 'Peter paid no attention to his grandfather’s words. Boys like Peter aren’t afraid of wolves.' — Gloria is acting in defiance of Dammick, not Sy. And the cat, Peter’s companion in the story, is a stranger to Gloria and will be hostile to her interests". Zack Handlen of The A.V. Club noted that the fact Emmit and his identical, less successful brother Ray were respectively the bird and duck was a good joke.

==== Other ====
In the episode, Ray, impersonates his brother Emmit and withdraws $10,000 from his brother's account, the estimated value of their dead father's rare stamp, which Ray believes Emmit owes him. Scott Tobias of The New York Times noted that Ray taking "only" $10,000 from his brother's account made him sympathetic, adding "He believes his brother owes him that stamp, but he’s not interested in taking more than it’s worth." Noel Murray of Rolling Stone stated "back in the car, when Nikki complains that he didn't take more money, Ray shrugs her off: 'See, that's the criminal mentality.' Even though he just stole 10 grand, he's no crook."

Murray called V. M. Varga "the perfect villain for our times", calling him, "an agent of the kleptocrats – with ties to Vladimir Putin and an innate understanding of how "fake news" and shameless bullying works – this year's adversary is practically a living embodiment of everything terrifying that's happening in the world circa 2017. He even speaks the language of our more authoritarian leaders, arguing that we live in 'the age of the refugee,' and that the best we can do is lay low and take care of ourselves, before the inevitable revolution comes."

In the episode, Yuri Gurka explains the three meanings of "truth" in the Russian language: “pravda,” (man's truth), “istina,” (God's truth), and ”nepravda”, (what the leader decides is true). Mancuso of the New York Observer defined Fargo as "the purest combination of all three of those concepts at the same time".
