= The House of Special Purpose (Fargo) =

- Fargo episode
- Episode no.: Season 3 Episode 5
- Directed by: Dearbhla Walsh
- Written by: Bob DeLaurentis
- Cinematography by: Dana Gonzales
- Editing by: Regis Kimble
- Production code: XFO03005
- Original air date: May 17, 2017
- Running time: 61 minutes

Guest appearances
- Michael Stuhlbarg as Sy Feltz; Olivia Sandoval as Winnie Lopez; Shea Whigham as Chief Moe Dammik; Hamish Linklater as Agent Larue Dollard; Mark Forward as Donny Mashman; Linda Kash as Stella Stussy; Mary McDonnell as Ruby Goldfarb

Episode chronology
← Previous "The Narrow Escape Problem"	Next → "The Lord of No Mercy"
- Fargo (season 3)

"The House of Special Purpose" is the fifth episode of the third season of the American anthology black comedy–crime drama television series Fargo. It is the 25th overall episode of the series and was written by co-executive producer Bob DeLaurentis and directed by Dearbhla Walsh. It originally aired on FX on May 17, 2017.

The season is set primarily in 2010, in three Minnesota towns: St. Cloud, Eden Valley, and Eden Prairie. It follows the lives of a couple, Ray Stussy and Nikki Swango, who, after unsuccessfully trying to rob Ray's wealthy older brother Emmit, become involved in a double murder case. One of the victims is an old man with a mysterious past whose stepdaughter, Gloria Burgle, is a policewoman. Meanwhile, Emmit tries to cut his ties with a shady organization he borrowed money from a year before, but the company, represented by V. M. Varga, has other plans. In the episode, Emmit's life crumbles after Ray and Nikki film a sex tape with Ray pretending to be Emmit. Meanwhile, Sy is punished by Varga and he looks for a way out, all while trying to end the feud between Emmit and Ray.

According to Nielsen Media Research, the episode was seen by an estimated 0.98 million household viewers and gained a 0.3 ratings share among adults aged 18–49. The episode received critical acclaim, with critics praising the writing, humor, character development, performances and building momentum.

== Plot ==
Emmit (Ewan McGregor) is sent a sex tape filmed by Ray (McGregor) and Nikki (Mary Elizabeth Winstead), where Ray posed as Emmit. They demand $100,000 or they will show it to Stella (Linda Kash). However, Stella sees the tape first and is disgusted by its content. When Emmit arrives home, Stella has taken their children and her mother, and they leave the house.

At Stussy Lots, Sy (Michael Stuhlbarg) finds Varga (David Thewlis) at his office, angry at Sy for talking to the police earlier. He urinates in Sy's coffee mug and has Yuri (Goran Bogdan) force Sy to drink it, despite Sy's claim that the conversation had nothing to do with Varga. Having lost his office and with Emmit not answering his calls, Sy meets with Ruby Goldfarb (Mary McDonnell), a wealthy widow interested in buying Stussy Lots. The meeting is interrupted when Emmit calls Sy back, so he visits him at his house. Emmit tells Sy of the sex tape and blames him for failing to handle the situation with Ray. He then gives Sy free rein to use whatever means necessary to stop Ray and Nikki.

After accepting Ray's marriage proposal, Nikki goes shopping for a wedding dress. She is contacted by Sy, who reprimands her for the tape, telling her that the demands are now worthless as the family watched it. Instead, she now demands $200,000 to tell Stella the truth. Sy arranges a meeting at a lot.

Ray is questioned by Gloria (Carrie Coon) and Winnie (Olivia Sandoval), as they have found more coincidences in Ennis' murder relating to Maurice and his connection to Emmit. Ray denies the claims and is released, as Chief Moe Dammik (Shea Whigham) forces Gloria to let him go due to a lack of evidence.

Emmit meets with Varga, who says that Sy can't be trusted and may even be working with Ray. To complicate matters, Emmit is visited in his office by IRS agent Larue Dollard (Hamish Linklater), who was sent to audit him based on the $10,000 that Ray took from his account. After he leaves, Varga suggests to Emmit that he could take care of the problem by giving IRS fake books. Sy meets with Nikki, offering her $40,000 so she and Ray leave the state, but Nikki demands the $200,000 and the stamp. The meeting is interrupted by the arrival of Yuri and Meemo, who reproach Sy for trying to go behind Varga's back. The two proceed to brutally attack Nikki as a horrified Sy looks on. Yuri and Meemo then leave, followed shortly by Sy. Nikki is forced to drive home with her injuries, where Ray finds her collapsed in the bathtub.

== Production ==
=== Development ===
In April 2017, it was reported that the fifth episode of the season would be titled "The House of Special Purpose", and was to be directed by Dearbhla Walsh and written by co-executive producer Bob DeLaurentis. This was DeLaurentis' third writing credit, and Walsh's first directing credit.

== Reception ==
=== Viewers ===
In its original American broadcast, "The House of Special Purpose" was seen by an estimated 0.98 million household viewers and gained a 0.3 ratings share among adults aged 18–49, according to Nielsen Media Research. This means that 0.3 percent of all households with televisions watched the episode. This was a 7% decrease in viewership from the previous episode, which was watched by 1.05 million viewers with a 0.4 in the 18-49 demographics.

=== Critical reviews ===
"The House of Special Purpose" received critical acclaim. The review aggregator website Rotten Tomatoes reported a 100% approval rating with an average rating of 8.7/10 for the episode, based on 14 reviews.

Matt Fowler of IGN gave the episode a "great" 8.8 out of 10 and wrote in his verdict, "Aside from a few clunky moments, Fargo's third season improved greatly this week as things escalated to violent levels after the Stussy brothers' feud finally began to yield dire consequences for members of the main cast."

Zack Handlen of The A.V. Club gave the episode a "B+" grade and wrote, "While it still suffers from some of the sluggishness that's been dragging down the season as a whole, 'The House Of Special Purposes' takes steps toward bringing the larger thematic concerns of the tale of the Stussys and Gloria Burgle into clearer focus."

Alan Sepinwall of Uproxx wrote, "'The House of Special Purpose' takes us to the midpoint of season three, and to points of no return for the Stussy brothers and their respective confidantes. Arguably, Emmit and Ray were doomed from the moments the former didn't immediately call the cops on VM Varga and the latter sent Maurice to burgle his brother, but there is doomed, and then there is doomed to suffer the worst fate imaginable, while others around you pay terribly for your sins." Ben Travers of IndieWire gave the episode an "A-" grade and wrote, "It finally happened. After four weeks of relatively harmless fun - save for the comically killed Maurice LaFay - Fargo took us to the emotional woodshed."

Kevin P. Sullivan of Entertainment Weekly, who gave the episode a "B" grade, wrote, "This episode does progress things in a positive way, adding the emotional stakes that have been mostly missing so far." Brian Tallerico of Vulture gave the episode a perfect 5 star rating out of 5 and wrote, "A fantastic, tense, and very dark episode of Fargo ends with the brutal beating of a major character, and the sense that the violence is far from over." Nick Harley of Den of Geek gave the episode a 5 star rating out of 5 wrote, "With characters and conflicts crossing streams left and right, the uneasy peace on Fargo can't be kept up for much longer. This thing is a powder keg waiting to blow and there's no telling who will get caught in the blast. Next week expect Ray to retaliate over what happened to Nikki, while Gloria will likely be searching for 'Vanessa', the owner of the air conditioner that killed Maurice. We're at the halfway point, and it looks like it'll be all downhill from here."

Scott Tobias of The New York Times wrote, "Over three seasons, Fargo has proved itself as a viable and satisfying piece of fan fiction, and Noah Hawley and his team are now spinning yarns (and yarns within yarns) with an unpracticed dexterity." Caralynn Lippo of TV Fanatic gave the episode a 4.5 star rating out of 5 and wrote, "The various plots are beginning to condense and intertwine on 'The House of Special Purpose', the midway point of the season." Kyle Fowle of Paste gave the episode a 7.5 rating out of 10 and wrote, "What Fargo seems to be poking at is the little compromises we all make with ourselves to justify our indiscretions."
