= The Lord of No Mercy =

- Fargo episode
- Episode no.: Season 3 Episode 6
- Directed by: Dearbhla Walsh
- Written by: Noah Hawley
- Cinematography by: Dana Gonzales
- Editing by: Henk Vaneeghen
- Production code: XFO03006
- Original air date: May 24, 2017
- Running time: 46 minutes

Guest appearances
- Michael Stuhlbarg as Sy Feltz; Hamish Linklater as Agent Larue Dollard; Olivia Sandoval as Winnie Lopez

Episode chronology
← Previous "The House of Special Purpose"	Next → "The Law of Inevitability"
- Fargo (season 3)

"The Lord of No Mercy" is the sixth episode of the third season of the American anthology black comedy–crime drama television series Fargo. It is the 26th overall episode of the series and was written by series creator Noah Hawley and directed by Dearbhla Walsh. It originally aired on FX on May 24, 2017.

The season is set primarily in 2010, in three Minnesota towns: St. Cloud, Eden Valley, and Eden Prairie. It follows the lives of a couple, Ray Stussy and Nikki Swango, who, after unsuccessfully trying to rob Ray's wealthy older brother Emmit, become involved in a double murder case. One of the victims is an old man with a mysterious past whose stepdaughter, Gloria Burgle, is a policewoman. Meanwhile, Emmit tries to cut his ties with a shady organization he borrowed money from a year before, but the company, represented by V. M. Varga, has other plans. In the episode, Nikki and Ray plot revenge against Yuri and Meemo, eventually discovering their connection through Varga. Meanwhile, Varga explains the next step in their expansion to Emmit and Sy.

According to Nielsen Media Research, the episode was seen by an estimated 1.04 million household viewers and gained a 0.2 ratings share among adults aged 18–49. The episode received universal acclaim, with critics praising the performances, character development, writing, directing and ending.

== Plot ==
Nikki (Mary Elizabeth Winstead) tells Ray (Ewan McGregor) about her beating. An angered Ray takes a gun and both intend to go after Yuri (Goran Bogdan) and Meemo (Andy Yu).

Varga (David Thewlis) explains to Emmit and Sy (Michael Stuhlbarg) about his plans for expansion. He uses real-life stories, like the bankruptcy of Lehman Brothers, the assassination of Archduke Franz Ferdinand, and the Apollo 11 Moon landing, with Varga suggesting it was filmed at a sound stage in New Mexico. Varga wants to expand by 16 garages within three months. Sy does not see his tactics as viable, as it would put them in a heavy debt, but Emmit is actually interested. Varga also has Meemo pose as Emmit's lawyer with IRS agent Dollard (Hamish Linklater), convincing him to leave Stussy Lots.

Gloria (Carrie Coon) and Winnie (Olivia Sandoval) question Emmit at his office. Varga joins the conversation and prevents Emmit from elaborating any further when they inform him of Ennis Stussy's death. After checking her police department, Varga orders Yuri to retrieve Ennis Stussy's file and orders Meemo to kill Ray and Nikki. As Gloria and Winnie arrive to knock at their door, Ray and Nikki are forced to flee to a motel room. Ray leaves Nikki in the room while he goes back to retrieve the $10,000 he took from Emmit's account and forgot during their escape. Unaware to both of them, Meemo has been following them.

Ray arrives at his apartment and finds Emmit, who offers to end the feud by giving Ray the framed stamp and offering to give Ray anything else he may want. Ray is leery, and they argue. As they shove the frame into each other, Emmit accidentally shoves it strong enough that the frame shatters on Ray's face, with a shard of glass severing his artery. A distraught Emmit stares as Ray bleeds to death. Desperate, he calls Varga for help in cleaning the scene. Varga tells Meemo to leave his mission at the motel room to help in cleaning the scene. Varga then stages the scene to look like Nikki murdered Ray after he abused her. While driving back home, Gloria decides to reverse course, instructing Winnie to meet her at Ray's apartment.

== Production ==
=== Development ===
In April 2017, it was reported that the sixth episode of the season would be titled "The Lord of No Mercy", and was to be directed by Dearbhla Walsh and written by series creator Noah Hawley. This was Hawley's 19th writing credit, and Walsh's second directing credit.

== Reception ==
=== Viewers ===
In its original American broadcast, "The Lord of No Mercy" was seen by an estimated 1.04 million household viewers and gained a 0.2 ratings share among adults aged 18–49, according to Nielsen Media Research. This means that 0.2 percent of all households with televisions watched the episode. This was a 6% increase in viewership from the previous episode, which was watched by 0.98 million viewers with a 0.3 in the 18-49 demographics.

=== Critical reviews ===
"The Lord of No Mercy" received universal acclaim. The review aggregator website Rotten Tomatoes reported a 100% approval rating with an average rating of 9.0/10 for the episode, based on 14 reviews.

Matt Fowler of IGN gave the episode an "amazing" 9.3 out of 10 and wrote in his verdict, "If last week's episode was the season finally flashing its fangs, 'The Lord of No Mercy' was an all out snaggle-toothed assault. In a shocking moment, a Stussy brother fell during what could have been a moment of reconciliation while this year's ghoulish villain began to stake his claim in a more ruthless manner. It became clear this week, thanks to some choice (and unexpected) character similarities, that the endgame here may be a collision between Varga and Gloria."

Zack Handlen of The A.V. Club gave the episode an "A" grade and wrote, "The situation was of course going to turn homicidal eventually, but while I'm not sure we needed to wait quite this long before the real unpleasantness began, I do appreciate how difficult it was to predict the first major corpse in advance."

Alan Sepinwall of Uproxx wrote, "If it's surprising, it's also necessary, and suggests a more exciting conclusion to the season than prior episodes might have suggested." Ben Travers of IndieWire gave the episode an "A-" grade and wrote, "Painful, tense, and thoroughly engaging, Fargo kicked things into high gear in Episode 6, as the Ewan McGregor blood feud reached a point of no return."

Ray Rahman of Entertainment Weekly gave the episode a "B+" grade wrote, "The episode begins with Varga telling a story. Well, less a story, really, than an overview of history as he sees it: a commingling of fate and randomness that leads to death and sorrow for some, and great fortunes for others who know how to extract it." Brian Tallerico of Vulture gave the episode a perfect 5 star rating out of 5 and wrote, "It's fun to see how much this show can mix it up in terms of length, and this one was tight and clever, although I'm starting to worry that there isn't enough time left in this season to wrap everything up." Nick Harley of Den of Geek gave the episode a 4.5 star rating out of 5 wrote, "The possible collision of those two characters makes me anticipate next week, but there are other things I'm looking forward to as well. Sy's reaction to Ray's death will surely be something to behold, and there's still the matter of the Widow Goldfarb hanging in the air. Also, Varga's discovery of the low tech Eden Valley Police Station leads him to order Yuri to go obtain Ennis Stussy's case file. No matter how low tech the station may be, breaking into a police station still sounds exciting. Fargo has steadily gotten better each week and I hope that trend continues."

Scott Tobias of The New York Times wrote, "With the creator Noah Hawley taking over scripting duties, Fargo enters the second half of its 10-episode season by eliminating one of its catalysts, but tightening the screws elsewhere." Caralynn Lippo of TV Fanatic gave the episode a 4.5 star rating out of 5 and wrote, "As the opening titles have indicated, this season of Fargo is all about the nature of truth - what is true, whether it is immutable, who defines truth, etc. On 'The Lord of No Mercy', that theme is particularly pertinent." Kyle Fowle of Paste gave the episode an 8 rating out of 10 and wrote, "It's still too early to unpack all the thematic musings, but one does get the sense that this season, for all of its cops-and-criminals drama, is one focused on the need for human connection, truth and empathy."

=== Accolades ===
TVLine named Ewan McGregor as the "Performer of the Week" for the week of May 27, 2017, for his performance in the episode. The site wrote, "Like Tatiana Maslany on Orphan Black, McGregor has so skillfully differentiated his two characters here — Emmit is the polite, genial big-business tycoon; Ray is the scruffy, embittered black sheep — that it's easy to forget they're played by the same actor. This week, McGregor had to play both Ray's macho fury in the wake of Nikki's beating, as well as Emmit's genuine hurt when he realized the depth of his brother's grudge against him, and he pulled off both with remarkable dexterity."
