= Somebody to Love (Fargo) =

- Fargo episode
- Episode no.: Season 3 Episode 10
- Directed by: Keith Gordon
- Written by: Noah Hawley
- Cinematography by: Dana Gonzales
- Editing by: Regis Kimble
- Production code: XFO03010
- Original air date: June 21, 2017
- Running time: 53 minutes

Guest appearances
- Michael Stuhlbarg as Sy Feltz; Russell Harvard as Mr. Wrench; Olivia Sandoval as Winnie Lopez; Hamish Linklater as Agent Larue Dollard; Linda Kash as Stella Stussy; Mary McDonnell as Ruby Goldfarb

Episode chronology
← Previous "Aporia"	Next → "Welcome to the Alternate Economy"
- Fargo (season 3)

"Somebody to Love" is the tenth episode and season finale of the third season of the American anthology black comedy–crime drama television series Fargo. It is the 30th overall episode of the series and was written by series creator Noah Hawley and directed by Keith Gordon. It originally aired on FX on June 21, 2017.

The season is set primarily in 2010, in three Minnesota towns: St. Cloud, Eden Valley, and Eden Prairie. It follows the lives of a couple, Ray Stussy and Nikki Swango, who, after unsuccessfully trying to rob Ray's wealthy older brother Emmit, become involved in a double murder case. One of the victims is an old man with a mysterious past whose stepdaughter, Gloria Burgle, is a policewoman. Meanwhile, Emmit tries to cut his ties with a shady organization he borrowed money from a year before, but the company, represented by V. M. Varga, has other plans. In the episode, Nikki makes her final plan to take down Varga while also seeking revenge against Emmit.

According to Nielsen Media Research, the episode was seen by an estimated 1.22 million household viewers and gained a 0.3 ratings share among adults aged 18–49. The episode received positive reviews from critics, who praised the performances, writing, directing and pacing. The ambiguity of the ending also drew commentary, with divided responses among critics.

== Plot ==
Gloria (Carrie Coon) prepares to submit her resignation as a deputy, when she is contacted by Agent Dollard of the IRS (Hamish Linklater), as her phone number appeared in the envelope. While Gloria didn't send the envelope, she agrees to meet with him, as his case involves Varga (David Thewlis). Dollard then explains that part of Varga's plan is to use Stussy Lots as some form of tax fraud scam.

Varga has Emmit (Ewan McGregor) sign many documents for his business. With Meemo (Andy Yu) distracted, Emmit takes his gun and confronts Varga for everything he did. Meemo manages to knock Emmit out. Varga then orders his men to clean the house while he leaves to meet with Nikki (Mary Elizabeth Winstead), unaware that she already sent the financial records to the IRS. Varga and his henchmen arrive at the meeting place, with a kid directing them to a warehouse. Varga and his henchman then take an elevator to the upper floor. Varga receives a message that the IRS knows about his records, so he flees the area in the elevator. Meemo and the henchmen are left and subsequently killed by Mr. Wrench (Russell Harvard). Nikki waits for Varga, only to discover his coat and the shaft door open. Mr. Wrench arrives with the suitcase and to his surprise, Nikki only takes a small part of the money it contains and both part ways.

Emmit goes back to Stussy Lots, only to discover that Ruby Goldfarb (Mary McDonnell) is now the legitimate owner of the business after buying it for $100,000, with Emmit realizing that she worked with Varga. Because he is liable for the company's debt, he now must file Chapter 11 bankruptcy, but he will still get $20 million from untraceable offshore accounts. As Gloria and Winnie (Olivia Sandoval) investigate the warehouse massacre, they see security footage and recognize Nikki. Gloria then leaves to warn Emmit.

As he drives, Emmit's car stalls in the middle of a road with no phone signal. Nikki arrives with a shotgun, with Emmit accepting his fate. However, their encounter is interrupted when a state trooper arrives, forcing Nikki to hide her shotgun behind the car on the rear bumper. The trooper then asks for both of their documents, Nikki grabs her shotgun. Both Nikki and the trooper shoot at each other, both dying from their injuries. Emmit flees the scene, while Gloria and the authorities arrive later to take the bodies. Emmit then visits Stella (Linda Kash), where he sobs at her feet.

Five years later, Emmit declared bankruptcy, pleaded guilty to misdemeanor tax fraud and served two years of probation (though unproven, it is rumored he has $20 million in offshore accounts). He has dinner with his family, having rekindled his marriage, and with Sy (Michael Stuhlbarg), who survived his coma but is handicapped and can barely speak. Emmit then goes to the kitchen for salad and stares at photos of his family and friends. While distracted, Mr. Wrench kills him with a silenced pistol.

Three months later at John F. Kennedy International Airport, Gloria now works as a DHS officer. Varga has been captured after arriving from Brussels and is now in custody with the name "Daniel Rand". Gloria questions him, as she knows his real identity, informing him of Emmit's death and believing he might be involved. She states that within five minutes, he will be arrested for money laundering and the murders. However, a calm Varga states that within five minutes, he will be released. They both wait for what will happen as the episode ends.

== Production ==
=== Development ===
In May 2017, it was reported that the tenth and final episode of the season would be titled "Somebody to Love", and was to be directed by Keith Gordon and written by series creator Noah Hawley. This was Hawley's 23rd writing credit, and Gordon's fourth directing credit.

=== Writing ===
The five-year time jump was used to portray that real-life cases could drag on for years before they were finally concluded, with Hawley saying "there's this sense that if you're not moment-by-momenting the story, somehow the stakes are lower, which I don't think so." Mr. Wrench's quest for revenge was deemed a result of his appreciation and love for Nikki, with Hawley explaining "Nikki showed him she was an honorable person. He kept all the money and she just wanted justice and she never got that justice. So I think that to the degree that he had any kind of code, he was coming. One way or another."

In contrast to previous seasons, the ending wraps in an ambiguous theme, not revealing what would be the fate of V. M. Varga. Hawley decided on the ending while breaking the story, deeming it the strongest ending for the episode. Hawley explained that he wanted to deviate from the consistency established from the previous seasons, deeming that the case is up to the interpretation of the viewer, "There's a degree to which I wanted to engage the audience in that question of does it end well or does it end poorly, and if you think it ends poorly, then maybe you'll think about why you think it ends poorly. There's a degree to which I feel like it's okay to engage the audience actively in the story." He further added, "If I present you with a choice, you have to decide how that door is going to open and if it's going to end well. It still has a happy ending if you're an optimist. It just becomes a more active process. It's an allegory to the conversation we're having at this moment. How will we treat each other? Is it American carnage?"

== Reception ==
=== Viewers ===
In its original American broadcast, "Somebody to Love" was seen by an estimated 1.22 million household viewers and gained a 0.3 ratings share among adults aged 18–49, according to Nielsen Media Research. This means that 0.3 percent of all households with televisions watched the episode. This was a slight increase in viewership from the previous episode, which was watched by 1.19 million viewers with a 0.3 in the 18-49 demographics.

=== Critical reviews ===
"Somebody to Love" received positive reviews from critics. The review aggregator website Rotten Tomatoes reported a 76% approval rating with an average rating of 8.6/10 for the episode, based on 21 reviews. The site's consensus states: "'Somebody to Love' concludes Fargo's third season with an episode that - while not this arc's finest hour - plays on its core themes and offers its characters resolution."

Matt Fowler of IGN gave the episode an "amazing" 9.2 out of 10 and wrote in his verdict, "If this winds up, in the end, being Fargo's final bow on TV, then, thematically, it works wonderfully. The ever hopeful officer of the law facing down an evil overlord who thinks he's above it all. It's very bubble vs. the big bad world out there. But Gloria was no longer just a small town cop by the end. She'd brought her scope, and sense of justice, to a bigger platform - one that paralleled Varga's scheming. And so the two of them could square off, evenly, regarding the nature of truth and condemnation."

Zack Handlen of The A.V. Club gave the episode an "A-" grade and wrote, "The ending is the best part of the episode, maybe the best part of the season as a whole; it gives every odd digression and weird character choice the ring of intentionality and resonance that I've been wanting for so long."

Alan Sepinwall of Uproxx wrote, "If Hawley has a brainstorm for another year, I can't wait to see it. And if he decides not to press his luck any more on this insane gamble, then that image of Schrodinger's Door feels like a perfect concluding one. This was a true story. Only it wasn't at all. But it was great." Ben Travers of IndieWire gave the episode a "B" grade and wrote, "With all this uncertainty in a world demanding certainty, why was the open-ended finale ultimately unsatisfying. The easy answer is that we want answers."

Kevin P. Sullivan of Entertainment Weekly gave the episode an "A-" grade wrote, "While I maintain that this the weakest season by many measures, the story of Gloria Burgle, V.M. Varga, and the Stussys wades into some of the murkiest and most intriguing philosophical questions of the series to date." Brian Tallerico of Vulture gave the episode a 4 star rating out of 5 and wrote, "The third season of Fargo ends with something of a cliffhanger, but it's one that plays into exactly what this season has been about: the fluid nature of truth." Nick Harley of Den of Geek gave the episode a 2.5 star rating out of 5 and wrote, "Fargo may not be back for Season 4, and I wouldn't be heartbroken if this were the end, but I would be a little disappointed. Sure, I'm sick of the goofy accents and could use a rest on the fake true crime stuff, but Fargo deserves a better swan song than this. Seasons 1 & 2 were electric; this finale was just fine."

Scott Tobias of The New York Times wrote, "The season finale brings us to the 'little bit of money' part of Fargo, the moral reckoning part, in which our hero - in this case, Gloria - surveys the carnage and is left aghast at the pointlessness of it all." Caralynn Lippo of TV Fanatic gave the episode a perfect 5 star rating out of 5 and wrote, "We never see the clock hit that 5-minute mark, so we'll never know Varga's ultimate fate. And truly, that's the best – the only – way for it to end." Kyle Fowle of Paste gave the episode a 9.5 rating out of 10 and wrote, "What's emerged across the season, and somewhat falls into place in 'Somebody to Love', is a lingering sense of dread when it comes to this balance, and technology plays a central role in the mounting angst."
