= Dearbhla Walsh =

Irish film and television director

Dearbhla Walsh is an Irish film and television director who has worked on drama series for several television channels in Ireland and the United Kingdom, including episodes of EastEnders, Shameless and The Tudors. She won the 2009 Emmy Award for Outstanding Directing for a Miniseries, Movie or Dramatic Special for Part I of the serial Little Dorrit. In her acceptance speech, she acknowledged her then domestic partner, RTÉ television presenter Anna Nolan.

Walsh has won two Irish Film and Television Awards for directing in 2011 and 2018 respectively. In 2009, Irish Minister for Arts, Sport and Tourism Martin Cullen called her "one of our most accomplished directors".

== Career ==
Walsh earned a degree from Dublin City University and has worked extensively in television, including children's programming. Her work on the BBC soap opera EastEnders included the murder trial of Little Mo Mitchell.

In 2004, Walsh directed The Big Bow Wow for RTÉ. The following year, she directed Funland for BBC Three, and in 2006, she directed the four-part RTÉ drama series Hide and Seek. Also in 2006, Walsh directed a short film called Match for the Dance on the Box project, designed to promote the topic of dance, for RTÉ and the Arts Council. The film was awarded €18,000 for being selected. Described by Liam Fay of The Sunday Times as "two blokes rolling around on the pitch at Croke Park," the film was one of four aired on a special programme called The View Presents . . . Dance on the Box.

In 2007, Walsh directed BAFTA winner Danny Brocklehurst's ITV drama Talk to Me. The series, which featured scenes of a sexual nature between an adulterous teacher and her 15-year-old pupil, was defended by Walsh, who denied she had made them more raunchy on purpose. She commented, "I think the explicitness of the sex scenes and the sex scenes in general were challenging and intimidating for me as the director, as they were for the actors. They're not easy at all to do and they do all completely depend on trust. It may be explicit for nine o'clock – but it's not so much about sex as about love. Its aim definitely wasn't to shock. It wasn't about testing the watershed at all".

In 2010 she directed The Silence for BBC1, about a deaf girl who witnesses a murder. It stars Douglas Henshall and Gina McKee. She also directed Mo Mhórchoir Féin, a dance film with choreographer Fearghus Ó Conchúir, that was part of RTÉ's Dance on the Box series. The film explores the uncomfortable role of the body within the contemporary Irish church. Walsh directed two episodes of the horror television series Penny Dreadful. She directed Roald Dahl's Esio Trot, a television film adaptation of Roald Dahl's novel of the same name. Walsh has been nominated for the Irish Film and Television Awards four times.

In 2017, Walsh was one of the directors signed on for American television series Fargo's third series. Walsh directed the episodes "The House of Special Purpose" and "The Lord of No Mercy". She is also the first woman to direct a Fargo episode. That year she also directed an episode of the Netflix Marvel series The Punisher. In 2022, she directed episodes of the Peabody Award winning show Bad Sisters and Shining Vale.
