= Monica Beletsky =

American television producer and screenwriter

- Born: Monica Henderson; Philadelphia, Pennsylvania, United States
- Other names: M.H. Beletsky; Monica Henderson Beletsky
- Occupations: Television producer, television writer, screenwriter
- Years active: 2009–present
- Spouse: Leo Beletsky (2011-2020) divorced

Monica Beletsky (born Monica Henderson, sometimes credited as Monica Henderson Beletsky) is an American television producer and screenwriter.

== Biography ==
Beletsky grew up in Philadelphia, Pennsylvania and is a graduate of the Julia R. Masterman School. She went to Harvard University.

She was a theatre director from 2000–2006 in NYC and the U.K. Her mother is Jewish and her father is African American.

She was a writer and producer for the third season of the FX series, Fargo. Past writing and producing credits include the drama series The Leftovers (winner of the Peabody Award in 2016), Friday Night Lights, and the first four seasons of Parenthood.

In 2017, Beletsky was nominated with her colleagues for an Emmy Award for Best Limited Series and a PGA and a WGA Award for Long Form Adapted for Fargo. In 2011, she was on the team of writers nominated for a Writers Guild of America award for Best Drama series for the fourth and fifth seasons of Friday Night Lights.

The best seller, The Guilty Feminist by Deborah Frances-White is dedicated to Beletsky and a few other influential people in the podcaster/author's life.

In 2019, Beletsky received an overall TV development deal from Apple TV+, where she created the miniseries Manhunt, about the hunt for Abraham Lincoln's assassin John Wilkes Booth.
