= V. M. Varga =

Fargo character

- Fargo character
- David Thewlis as V. M. Varga in the Fargo episode "The Lord of No Mercy" (2017)
- First appearance: "The Law of Vacant Places" (2017)
- Last appearance: "Somebody to Love" (2017)
- Created by: Noah Hawley
- Portrayed by: David Thewlis

In-universe information
- Alias: Daniel Rand
- Occupation: Crime boss; Businessman

V. M. Varga is a fictional character in the FX crime anthology television series Fargo, serving as the main antagonist of the third season. He was created by showrunner Noah Hawley and portrayed by David Thewlis.

Varga is a criminal mastermind of unknown origin who heads a massive money laundering operation. Along with his associates, Yuri and Meemo, he intends to seize control of a large business to become so rich that "he doesn't even exist".

== Character overview ==
Varga is a cunning and verbose criminal mastermind who presides over a massive money laundering scheme. He is the implied boss of the criminal organization Narwhal, which employs henchmen Yuri Gurka (Goran Bogdan), Meemo (Andy Yu) and Golem (DJ Qualls), who carry out murders and confidence tricks. Varga is of apparent English origin and has bulimia nervosa, which leads to his teeth deteriorating.

On the character's eating disorder, Thewlis has said, "The idea is bulimia in his life. He's a man who is so ultimately in control of seemingly everything, and it's therefore an expression of the one part of his existence that he's not in control of, something that at times he loses control of."

Despite his wealth, Varga shuns excess and is always seen wearing a discount suit and second-hand tie. Throughout the season, he is seen living in the back of a semi-trailer, in which he sleeps on the floor and works on a workstation connected to computer servers. According to Fargo creator Noah Hawley: "It's a very spartan life he lives... Obviously he's got a lot of money, but you'll never see him in a hotel or in a towncar."

There are signs of paranoia in Varga's dialogue and behavior: he expresses a belief in Moon landing conspiracy theories, claiming to have been a part of the filming of fake Moon landings, as well as prejudices such as antisemitism, believing that wealth should be used to "become invisible" to hide from "the Mongol hordes" and appearing to admire Joseph Stalin, a portrait of whom is seen on a wall next to Varga's workstation.

== Storyline ==
In 2010, Varga arrives at Stussy Corporation offices when CEO Emmit Stussy (Ewan McGregor) seeks to repay a business loan from Varga's shady organization made two years before. Varga explains that the company does not want their money back, and that it was an "investment" and partnership with his organization. Concerned for his business, Emmit asks his lawyer Irv Blumkin to investigate Varga. A Google search causes the lawyer's computer to crash and later, Varga's henchmen Yuri Gurka and Meemo kill Irv by throwing him from a multi-storey car park. Varga then forcibly takes ownership of an unused wing of Emmit's offices. Learning of a theft by Emmit's ne'er-do-well younger brother Ray (also McGregor), and Varga admitting to ordering Irv's murder, Emmit and his business partner Sy Feltz (Michael Stuhlbarg) consider selling their company.

Things escalate when Varga shows up unannounced for dinner at Emmit's house. After dinner, Varga proposes to sign Emmit on as a business partner. Although Emmit is reluctant, Varga convinces him that signing will allow him to become much richer and ensure his wealth is protected; the former ultimately complies. When St. Cloud police officer Winnie Lopez (Olivia Sandoval) turns up at the office to question Sy over a hit-and-run that he committed during a visit to Ray, Sy acts very suspiciously because Yuri and Meemo are watching. As punishment, Varga takes over Sy's office, urinates in Sy's mug, and makes him drink out of it at gunpoint.

Varga has a meeting with Emmit, voicing his distrust of Sy and suggests he and Ray may be working together to bring Emmit down. Explaining to Emmit and Sy, he plans to expand Stussy Lots by 16 garages within three months; Sy is wary, but Emmit seems eager. When police chief Gloria Burgle (Carrie Coon) and Lopez try to question Emmit, Varga curtails the meeting and obtains Gloria's card. When Emmit accidentally kills Ray during a fight, he calls Varga to manage the cleanup of the crime scene. Varga concocts a story that Ray abused his girlfriend Nikki Swango (Mary Elizabeth Winstead), causing injuries actually inflicted by Yuri, and she retaliated. At Christmas, Varga asks Emmit how he feels about killing Ray; Emmit responds, "Free", but begins to cry. He has one of his assassins, Golem (DJ Qualls), dress up as a police officer and attempt to kill an imprisoned Nikki in jail, but the attempt is thwarted by Gloria. Subsequently, Varga's men ambush a prison bus that is transporting Nikki and Mr. Wrench (Russell Harvard). Nikki escapes with Wrench's help; Golem and Yuri are killed during the chase. In the meanwhile, Varga poisons Sy, sending him into a coma.

Two-and-a-half months later, Nikki and Mr. Wrench are still at large, and Varga has expanded Emmit's business after becoming his partner. Varga gives Emmit tranquilizers to calm him, which he feigns taking. In an attempt to get out from under Varga's thumb, Emmit turns himself in to the police and confesses to all his crimes. To nullify Emmit's confession, Varga directs Meemo to kill two random men with the same surname, Marvin Stussy, a dentist in St. Cloud, is killed in the same manner as Ray, while a man named George Stussy is killed in a similar fashion to the death of Gloria's stepfather Ennis (committed by a parolee Ray had hired to steal a stamp from Emmit, and who killed Ennis in a case of mistaken identity), with the intention of these two deaths plus Ray and Ennis looking like the work of an unusual serial killer. Varga also directs an ex-con named Donald Woo to be arrested for the murders and deliberately take the fall, admitting to having committed all four. Varga meets with Nikki, and in order to get out of the blackmailing he repeatedly attempts to both poison and to hire her, but she refuses. Nikki gives Varga 24 hours to pay her $2 million ransom or she will send his and Emmit's financials to the IRS.

After returning from the police station, Emmit is forced to sign many contracts, after which he grabs Meemo's gun and attempts to force Varga to withdraw from his house and business. Varga incapacitates him, and Meemo attacks him from behind. After leaving Emmit's house, Varga, Meemo, and the crew go to meet Nikki and Mr. Wrench to pay the ransom for the hard drives, but are ambushed by Mr. Wrench. Meemo attempts to flee with Varga but Varga leaves his henchman behind. Meemo attempts to fight Wrench, but is overpowered and shot to death.

Emmit, regaining consciousness, goes to Stussy Lots' offices to find that Ruby Goldfarb (Mary McDonnell), one of Varga's other business partners, has finalized her acquisition of the company for $100,000 and has begun moving her employees into the building. Goldfarb assures Emmit that he holds millions in offshore accounts, but that he is liable for Stussy Lots' large debts and advises him to declare bankruptcy.

Five years later, Varga, going under the alias name "Daniel Rand", is arrested while trying to re-enter the United States. Gloria, now an agent for the Department of Homeland Security, is called in to interview him. She declares that in five minutes he will be going to jail for money laundering as well as conspiracy charges for the crimes he committed in Minnesota. Varga says that in five minutes Gloria's superior will arrive and let him go free. Gloria scoffs, then starts counting down the minutes on the cell's clock while Varga hums, confident. The lights dim, which Varga notices, seeming unnerved, before the screen cuts black, leaving his fate ambiguous.

== Production ==
Prior to his casting, Thewlis had already been a fan of the original 1996 film and had seen the previous two seasons. Upon learning that Hawley was interested in him for season 3, he jumped at the chance. Thewlis enjoyed playing the character, saying, "I think I've had more fun playing Varga than I've had for quite a number of years, playing anything. It's just so beautifully written. Every few weeks, I got a new script, I'd settle down with a cup of coffee like I was about to read Anna Karenina." Thewlis previously appeared in the 1998 Coen brothers film, The Big Lebowski.

== Reception ==
Thewlis received critical acclaim for his performance. Liz Shannon Miller of IndieWire remarked, "When Fargo Year 3 announced its cast, Ewan McGregor was clearly the biggest name involved, and the fact that he would be playing brothers had everyone intrigued. But in subsequent weeks, fans aren't clamoring for McGregor's Ray or Emmit, but they are obsessed with the character of V.M. Varga. And that's because David Thewlis is turning in one of the spring's darkest, most horrifying supporting performances, one that will be hard to overlook this Emmy season." Brian Tallerico of Vulture.com, praising the whole cast, singled out Thewlis, saying "If I had to pick one (MVP), it might be Thewlis, who gave the season its simmering menace." Maureen Ryan of Variety also opined "David Thewlis' sallow, well-spoken gangster, for instance, is one of the most menacing men to ever wear a sack-like, forgettable bargain suit."

For his work on Fargo, Thewlis was nominated for a Primetime Emmy Award for Outstanding Supporting Actor in a Limited Series or Movie, a Critics' Choice Television Award for Best Supporting Actor in a Movie/Miniseries, and a Golden Globe Award for Best Supporting Actor – Series, Miniseries or Television Film.
