= Emmit Stussy =

Fargo character

- Fargo character
- First appearance: "The Law of Vacant Places" (2017)
- Last appearance: "Somebody to Love" (2017)
- Created by: Noah Hawley
- Portrayed by: Ewan McGregor

In-universe information
- Title: Parking Lot King of Minnesota
- Occupation: CEO of Stussy Lots
- Family: Ray Stussy (brother); Dennis (son-in-law)
- Spouse: Stella Stussy
- Children: Grace Stussy

Emmit Stussy is a fictional character in the FX television series Fargo. He is one of several protagonists of the third season and is portrayed by Ewan McGregor.

== Character overview ==
=== 2010–2011 ===
In Eden Prairie, Minnesota, the self-proclaimed "Parking Lot King of Minnesota" Emmit Stussy celebrates his 25th wedding anniversary. Emmit's younger, less successful brother Ray (also McGregor) asks him for money. Emmit refuses the request. They discuss their past and it is revealed that their father, upon his death, bequeathed to Emmit a Corvette Stingray and to Ray a collection of rare, valuable stamps. Ray ended up with the Corvette, and still drives it though it is showing its age, and Emmit got the stamp collection, which he sold to start his business. Ray feels that Emmit took advantage of him to get the better deal; Emmit disputes this perspective. Ray is a St. Cloud parole officer who needs money to marry his new fiancée (and parolee) Nikki Swango (Mary Elizabeth Winstead), and thinks he can get it by selling the last stamp in the collection.

Giving up on asking Emmit for money, Ray manipulates a parolee, Maurice LeFay (Scoot McNairy), who has failed his drug test and therefore faces revocation of parole, into stealing the stamp from Emmit. However, on his way to Emmit's house, a stoned Maurice loses the paper on which Ray had written the address; trying to remember, Maurice confuses the town of Eden Prairie with Eden Valley, and, remembering only the name Emmit Stussy, finds in a phone book the address of an E. Stussy, who, unbeknownst to him, has no relation whatsoever with the Stussy brothers. Maurice kills Ennis Stussy (Scott Hylands), the stepfather of Eden Valley police chief Gloria Burgle (Carrie Coon).

Meanwhile, Nikki suggests Ray make peace with his brother while she steals the stamp. He visits Emmit and the two awkwardly wish each other well, which gives Nikki enough time to search Emmit's home office. However, Emmit had already moved the stamp, replacing it with a picture of a donkey. Nikki mistakenly believes that Emmit meant this as an insult to Ray (he had in fact sent the frame out to be repaired after a cleaning lady damaged it). Enraged, she leaves a used tampon in one of his desk drawers, where she also finds details of a safe deposit box Emmit holds. Emmit's business partner Sy Feltz (Michael Stuhlbarg) convinces him to cut Ray off financially. Ray and Nikki retaliate by stealing $10,000 from Emmit's bank accounts, then film a sex tape disguised as Emmit and a prostitute, which they send to Emmit's wife Stella (Linda Kash), who promptly leaves Emmit and takes their daughter, Grace.

Emmit and Feltz contact a shady organization, which they had borrowed money from two years ago, to pay them back fully with interest. However, the man sent by the company, the enigmatic V. M. Varga (David Thewlis), explains that the company does not want their money back, and that it was an "investment". Concerned for his business, Emmit asks his lawyer Irv Blumkin (Hardee Lineham) to investigate Varga; soon afterward, Varga's men toss Blumkin off a parking garage to his death. Varga then takes ownership of an unused wing of Emmit's offices, and persuades Emmit to greatly increase the size of the business, over Feltz's objections.

Emmit visits Ray at his apartment, intending to repair their relationship by giving him the stamp, but an indignant Ray refuses the gesture. An argument ensues in which Emmit accidentally cuts Ray's throat with broken glass from the frame, killing him. Panicked, he calls Varga, who stages the crime scene to make it look like Nikki killed Ray. A guilt-ridden Emmit confesses his crime to Burgle days later, but Varga pulls strings to make sure no charges are filed. Nikki confronts Emmit with a gun, intent on avenging Ray, and Emmit appears to accept his fate; however, a highway patrol officer encounters the two during their exchange. Despite Nikki's best efforts to throw off the officer, Emmit manages to warn him of her intentions. Both manage to pull their guns, and shoot each other. Nikki and the officer are killed instantly, but Emmit is able to flee.

When Feltz tries to rein in Varga's control of the business, Varga has him poisoned via a spiked cup of tea. He soon falls into a coma, and is left with permanent brain damage. Horrified, Emmit later attempts to back out of his dealings with Varga, but discovers that Varga's organization has already taken complete control of the company. Left with nothing, Emmit begs for Stella's forgiveness, and she takes him back.

=== 2016 ===
Emmit now lives with his family under greatly reduced circumstances, but is nonetheless happy. It is noted in a title card that he managed to turn a profit in his dealings with Varga, despite all that occurred. During Thanksgiving dinner, he goes to the kitchen and stops to look at a picture of himself and his family, including Sy, during happier times, and smiles. Ray is absent from all of these photos. At that moment, an assassin named “Mr. Wrench” (Russell Harvard) - a friend of Nikki's, who had promised her that he would help her avenge Ray's murder - sneaks up behind Emmit as he looks into the refrigerator and shoots him in the back of the head, killing him, and avenging Nikki.

== Reception ==
Ewan McGregor's performances as the Stussy brothers received critical acclaim, McGregor's performance, in particular, was described as the stand-out of the season. On review aggregation site Rotten Tomatoes, the critical consensus is " Thanks in part to a memorable dual performance from Ewan McGregor, Fargo mostly maintains the sly wit and off-kilter sensibility it displayed in its first two seasons."

In 2018, McGregor won a Golden Globe Award for Best Actor – Miniseries or Television Film for his performance as the Stussy brothers.
