= Mr. Wrench and Mr. Numbers =

Fargo characters

- Fargo characters
- Mr. Numbers (Adam Goldberg, left) and Mr. Wrench (Russell Harvard, right)
- First appearance: "The Rooster Prince" (2014)
- Last appearance: "Palindrome" (2015); (Mr. Numbers); "Somebody to Love" (2017) (Mr. Wrench)
- Created by: Noah Hawley
- Portrayed by: Russell Harvard and Adam Goldberg

In-universe information
- Occupation: Hitmen

Wes Wrench and Grady Numbers, mostly known as Mr. Wrench and Mr. Numbers, are fictional characters of the FX television series Fargo, most prominently appearing as antagonists in the first season. The characters, portrayed respectively by Russell Harvard and Adam Goldberg, were often highlighted as one of the stand-outs of season one by critics.

The characters later briefly re-appear as children in the season two finale "Palindrome", set many years before the first season, with Wrench appearing again as a recurring character in season three, set four years after season one.

== Relationship and character overviews ==
=== 1979–2006 ===
As shown in the season 2 finale, Numbers and Wrench were friends from childhood, growing up somewhere in the American midwest. Although Numbers did not have a hearing impairment, he learned sign language to be able to communicate with his friend. One day, when the two were playing baseball, they were attacked by two older boys, but the fight was interrupted by Hanzee Dent.

Years later, Wrench and Numbers would become hitmen in the employ of Dent, now known as Moses Tripoli. The pair work as partners and will perform what is asked of them no matter the circumstances.

After Sam Hess, Tripoli's lieutenant in Bemidji, Minnesota, is murdered by Lorne Malvo, Wrench and Numbers are sent to track Malvo down and kill him in retaliation. The pair initially kill an innocent man whom they mistake for Malvo, but eventually manage to locate their real target. However, after a long pursuit, Numbers is killed by Malvo and Wrench is severely injured and arrested. Later, while Wrench is recovering in a hospital in police custody, Malvo sneaks in to see him and, as a reward for coming the closest to killing him that anyone ever did, gives him the key to his restraints saying, "if you still feel raw about things when you heal up, come see me."

=== 2010–2016 ===
Wrench reappears in the season 3 episode "The Law of Inevitability", sitting next to Nikki Swango on a prison bus. Manacled together, they escape from the back of the bus, pursued by Yuri Gurka, who later runs off after his ear is lost to an axe, thrown by Wrench; Nikki and Wrench kill the other assassin pursuing them. The two later venture to points unknown in a car provided by Paul Marrane, whom they meet at a bowling alley. They go on to attempt to blackmail V. M. Varga by breaking into his semi-tractor trailer and stealing sensitive information. Nikki and Wrench ambush Varga and his crew when they come to pay ransom, though Varga escapes. The two part ways, and Nikki gives Wrench the briefcase full of money. She is later killed while trying to kill Emmit Stussy, the brother of her deceased lover Ray Stussy, whom she blamed for his death. Five years later, Wrench tracks down Emmit and kills him to avenge her death.

== Production ==
Writer-creator Noah Hawley, a part-time Austin resident who lives near the Texas School for the Deaf, cited his own neighborhood encounters with sign language as the inspiration for the Mr. Wrench character: a deaf assassin who uses his command of American Sign Language as a means of menace toward his targets and of private communication with his partner Mr. Numbers. Hawley has described Harvard as "magnetic and charismatic" in the role of Mr. Wrench, and ended up extending the character's appearance in the series. Hawley deliberately modeled the pair's appearance after Ratso Rizzo and Joe Buck from the film Midnight Cowboy.

Goldberg was cast after previously working on Hawley's TV series The Unusuals. Goldberg said; "That was just a straight up offer. Every once in a while there's a guy like Noah who sees something in me that maybe even I don't necessarily see."

During the five-month shoot in Calgary, Alberta, Harvard and the show's ASL manager, Catherine MacKinnon, worked closely with Goldberg on translating the pair's dialogue into the most effective ASL exchanges for their scenes.

== Reception ==
The characters and the performances of Goldberg and Harvard were well received by critics, with Alan Sepinwall of HitFix, "the relationship between Goldberg and Harvard feels unlike any criminal twosome of its type I've seen before, even in the midst of a show that is otherwise cleverly rearranging familiar pieces of the movie and other crime stories."

Tim Goodman, TV critic for The Hollywood Reporter, wrote, "Encapsulating everything that is joyously weird about Fargo, the killers are the dangerous — and deaf — Mr. Wrench (Russell Harvard) and his partner and translator, Mr. Numbers (Adam Goldberg)... Already I want a separate series that centers around Mr. Wrench and Mr. Numbers."
