= Ray Stussy =

Fargo character

- Fargo character
- First appearance: "The Law of Vacant Places" (2017)
- Last appearance: "Who Rules the Land of Denial?" (2017)
- Created by: Noah Hawley
- Portrayed by: Ewan McGregor

In-universe information
- Alias: Ray
- Species: Human (originally); Cat (reincarnation)
- Occupation: Parole officer
- Family: Emmit Stussy (brother); Dennis (nephew-in-law); Stella Stussy (sister-in-law); Grace Stussy (niece)
- Significant other: Nikki Swango

Raymond "Ray" Stussy is a fictional character in the FX television series Fargo. He is one of several protagonists of the third season and, like his brother Emmit, is played by Ewan McGregor.

== Character overview ==
=== 2010 ===
In Eden Prairie, Minnesota, Ray is a parole officer and the far less successful younger brother of the self-proclaimed "Parking Lot King of Minnesota" Emmit Stussy (also McGregor). Ray goes to Emmit’s 25th wedding anniversary with his fiancée (and former parolee) Nikki Swango (Mary Elizabeth Winstead). After the party, Ray asks Emmit for money as a means to pay for a ring for Nikki. Emmit refuses the request. They discuss their past and it is revealed that their father, upon his death, bequeathed to Emmit a Corvette Stingray and to Ray a collection of rare stamps. Ray ended up with the Corvette, and still drives it though it is showing its age, and Emmit got the stamp collection, which he sold to start his business. Hanging in Emmit's house is one of the stamps - a rare 'Sisyphus' stamp - and Ray argues that Emmit took advantage of him to get the better deal. Emmit disputes this perspective, with support from his business partner Sy Feltz (Michael Stuhlbarg).

Giving up on asking Emmit for money, Ray manipulates a parolee, Maurice LeFay (Scoot McNairy), who has failed his drug test and therefore faces revocation of parole, into stealing the stamp from Emmit. However, on his way to Emmit's house, a stoned Maurice loses the paper on which Ray had written the address; trying to remember, Maurice confuses the town of Eden Prairie with Eden Valley, and, remembering only the name "E. Stussy", finds in a phone book the address of an E. Stussy. The "E. Stussy" in Eden Valley is Ennis Stussy (Thomas Mann) the stepfather to Police Chief Gloria Burgle (Carrie Coon) and adoptive grandfather to Gloria's son Nathan (Graham Verchere). Thinking Ennis is the target, Maurice kills him and ransacks the house, stealing a strip of postage stamps. The crime scene is discovered by Gloria and Nathan when they return home to retrieve a present Ennis had given to Nathan.

Maurice then drives to Nikki's apartment to inform Ray of his actions and provides a strip of postage stamps. Ray, realizing the name mix-up, explains the situation to Nikki before an argument begins between him and Maurice. Maurice pulls a gun, demanding further payment or else he will turn Ray and Nikki in. As he leaves the apartment building, though, Nikki and Ray drop an air conditioner unit onto Maurice's head, killing him. She then calls 911, orchestrating the event to appear as a freak accident.

The tension between Ray and Emmit worsens, and Sy lashes out by crashing into Ray's Stingray with his Hummer. In retaliation, Nikki suggests Ray make peace with his brother while she steals the stamp. He cordially visits Emmit and the two make peace, which gives Nikki enough time to infiltrate the mansion and search his home office. However, Emmit has sent the stamp away to have the frame replaced after a cleaner had damaged it, and temporarily replaced it with a picture of a donkey. Enraged due to believing this was a message to Ray, she leaves a used tampon in one of his desk drawers (where she also finds details of a safety deposit box Emmit holds). Emmit later discovers the tampon, and, feeling betrayed, informs Sy. Angry and hurt, Emmit decides to cut his brother out of his life. Sy further retaliates by acquiring photos of Nikki and Ray together and sending them to Ray's bosses at the parole board, resulting in Ray getting fired.

Ray is questioned by Gloria, who has since made further connections between the death of her stepfather and Maurice's death, but he is able to maintain he and Nikki's story. After shaving his mustache and donning a wig, Ray impersonates Emmit and is able to retrieve the safety deposit box that Nikki stole the information for, but it only contains the remains of a family pet. Ray and Nikki then try to blackmail Emmit by filming a sex tape of themselves roleplaying as Emmit and a prostitute, and leave it at Emmit's house as a means of blackmail. The attempt backfires as Emmit's wife Stella (Linda Kash) finds it first and, believing it to be real, leaves Emmit. An enraged Sy calls Nikki, and agrees to a meeting later that day which is interrupted by Yuri Gurka (Goran Bogdan) and Meemo (Andy Yu), two henchman of Emmit's shady "silent partner" V.M. Varga (David Thewlis). The men beat Nikki and threaten Sy before departing, though Nikki survives and manages to drive herself to Ray's house. Ray arrives home to find her laying in the bathtub with numerous bruises across her body. Nikki recounts what happened to her and Ray, armed with a pistol, suggests they hide out at a motel before making a getaway.

The two arrive at the motel but are unknowingly followed by Meemo, and Ray realizes too late that they left a large sum of their remaining getaway money at the house. Despite protests from Nikki, Ray leaves to retrieve the money. Emmit confronts Ray at the house, wishing to make amends at last and offers the framed stamp to end the feud. Insulted, Ray refuses the stamp and the two get into a fight, that ends with Emmit accidentally smashing the glass frame into Ray's face and sending a shard into his neck. Emmit, shocked, steps away as Ray weakly calls out to him before he bleeds to death. Panicked, Emmit decides to call Varga, who agrees to cover up the murder and sets the rest of the season’s plot into motion.

Later, Ray's spirit is inferred by the immortal Wandering Jew Paul Murrane (Ray Wise) to have then inhabited the body of a young kitten, which Nikki then pets. Paul then assures Nikki that Ray will be safe.

== Reception ==
Ewan McGregor's performances as the Stussy brothers received critical acclaim, and was described by many as the stand-out of the season. On review aggregation site Rotten Tomatoes, the critical consensus is " Thanks in part to a memorable dual performance from Ewan McGregor, Fargo mostly maintains the sly wit and off-kilter sensibility it displayed in its first two seasons."

In 2018, McGregor won a Golden Globe Award for Best Actor – Miniseries or Television Film for his performance as the Stussy brothers.
