= Russell Harvard =

American actor (born 1981)

- Russell Harvard attending the "Being Heumann" Premiere at TIFF 2026
- Born: Russell Wayne Harvard; April 16, 1981 (age 45); Pasadena, Texas, U.S.
- Occupation: Actor
- Years active: 2006–present

Russell Wayne Harvard (born April 16, 1981) is an American actor. He made his feature film debut in Paul Thomas Anderson's There Will Be Blood (2007), playing opposite Daniel Day-Lewis as his adopted son, H.W. Plainview. In the 2010 biopic The Hammer, he portrayed deaf NCAA championship wrestler and UFC mixed martial arts fighter Matt Hamill. Harvard also won acclaim Off Broadway in 2012 as Billy, the deaf son in an intellectual, though dysfunctional, hearing British family, in Tribes by Nina Raine. For his interpretation, he won a 2012 Theatre World Award for Outstanding Debut Performance and nominations for Drama League, Outer Critics Circle and Lucille Lortel Awards for Outstanding Lead Actor. He played Mr. Wrench in the first and third seasons of the television series Fargo.

== Early life and education ==
Born in Pasadena, Texas, into a third-generation deaf family, Harvard is the younger of two deaf sons of Kay (Youngblood) and Henry Harvard. Both his parents and his paternal grandmother are also deaf. In the early 1980s, the Harvards moved to Austin, Texas so that their elder son Renny could enroll at their alma mater, Texas School for the Deaf (TSD). The family initially placed Russell (due to his speech capability and residual hearing) in an oral college for children who learn to lip read exclusively. Finding he was unhappy there, his parents switched him to a deaf school education at TSD, which included training in lip reading and speech therapy in English. Although he is able to hear some sound with the use of a hearing aid, including speech and music, he identifies himself Deaf and considers American Sign Language to be his first language.

After graduating from TSD in 1999, Harvard began his studies at Gallaudet University in Washington, D.C. At various times during his college education he took a hiatus to work as a teacher's assistant for preschoolers at the Alaska State School for the Deaf and Hard of Hearing in Anchorage, Alaska. (His mother later joined him, working for the American Red Cross.) While there he contemplated a career as a teacher of theater, and in 2008 he returned as Artist in Residence. At Gallaudet he maintained a high GPA and completed his bachelor's degree in Theatre Arts, graduating in 2008.

== Career ==
=== Film and television ===
While at Gallaudet, Harvard was prompted by one of his professors to submit a photo and resume to casting agents seeking a deaf actor for the film There Will Be Blood. He received an audition and won the part of H.W., for which he had to research and perform a vintage form of American Sign Language for the father-son confrontation scene with Day-Lewis.

Shortly after completing his scenes for There Will Be Blood, Harvard made his first network television appearance in the "Silent Night" episode of CBS's CSI: NY, opposite Marlee Matlin, and later guest-starred in "The Box" episode (2010) of the Fox series Fringe. Other TV appearances include Switched at Birth and Odd Mom Out. He has acted in the short films Signage (2007), Words (2010) and This Is Normal (2013), played the principal role of Tim in the independent feature Claustrophobia (2011), and had leading roles in the ASL Films Versa Effect and Gerald. Harvard is a member of the Screen Actors Guild and the Actors' Equity Association.

For The Hammer, Harvard was first cast as Matt Hamill's roommate Jay but inherited the lead role when the original choice to play Matt, the film's producer and cowriter, actor Eben Kostbar, ceded the part out of respect for the Deaf community's wishes to see an authentically Deaf actor in the role. In the film, Kostbar played the role of Coach Cantrell, while the part of Jay went to Deaf actor Michael Anthony Spady. The Hammer won Audience Awards at numerous film festivals, including AFI FEST, the Cleveland International Film Festival, the Florida Film Festival, the Heartland Film Festival, the Miami Film Festival and the Newport Beach Film Festival.

=== Fargo ===
In August 2013, the FX/MGM production team of Fargo, the anthology TV miniseries adaptation of the 1996 Coen brothers' film, cast Harvard as Mr. Wrench, one of two hitmen who pursue Billy Bob Thornton's lead character Lorne Malvo throughout the first season of the series.

Writer-creator Noah Hawley, a part-time Austin resident who lives near the Texas School for the Deaf, cited his own neighborhood encounters with sign language as the inspiration for the "Mr. Wrench" character: a deaf assassin who uses his command of ASL as a means of menace toward his targets and of private communication with his partner Mr. Numbers (played by Adam Goldberg). During the five-month shoot in Calgary, Alberta, Harvard and the show's ASL manager, Catherine MacKinnon, worked closely with Goldberg on translating the pair's dialogue into the most effective ASL exchanges for their scenes.

Critical response to Harvard and Goldberg's seriocomic turn as bickering hired killers was overwhelmingly positive. Reviewers noted that they "steal scenes as Mr. Numbers and Mr. Wrench" (Time), make up one of the "satisfying subplots" (HuffPost) and "have their own original energy" (Vulture.com) For Alan Sepinwall of Uproxx, "the relationship between Goldberg . . . and Harvard feels unlike any criminal twosome of its type I've seen before, even in the midst of a show that is otherwise cleverly rearranging familiar pieces of the movie and other crime stories." And Tim Goodman, TV critic for The Hollywood Reporter, wrote, "Encapsulating everything that is joyously weird about Fargo, the killers are the dangerous—and deaf—Mr. Wrench (Russell Harvard) and his partner and translator, Mr. Numbers (Adam Goldberg). Already I want a separate series that just follows around Mr. Wrench and Mr. Numbers." Series creator Hawley, moreover, who has described Harvard as "magnetic and charismatic" in the role of Mr. Wrench, ended up extending the character's appearance in the series. On June 19, 2014, the Broadcast Television Journalists Association honored Fargo with three awards (including Best Mini-series) at the Critics' Choice Television Awards ceremony. Fargo also won three Emmys—most prominently Outstanding Miniseries—at the 66th Annual Primetime Emmy Awards on August 25, 2014; Best Mini-Series or Motion Picture Made for Television at the 72nd Annual Golden Globe Awards on January 11, 2015; and, for "majestically reinventing a beloved tale and for expanding and richly rendering a darkly comic world of crime, revenge, and comeuppance", was honored with a 2014 Peabody Award, whose citation recognized Fargo as having set "a new standard for what is possible in the process of adaptation."

Harvard would reprise his role of Mr. Wrench in Season 3 of the series.

=== Theater ===
Harvard cites his seeing, at age eight, his cousin perform on stage in The Wizard of Oz as the inspiration for his becoming an actor. Subsequently, he became very involved in theater at TSD. At Gallaudet he appeared in a 2006 stage production of A Streetcar Named Desire and as Claudio in their co-production with Amaryllis Theatre of Much Ado About Nothing. His earliest professional stage work was in the twin roles of the Orderly and the Groundskeeper's Son in the world premiere of Rachel Sheinkin and GrooveLily's Sleeping Beauty Wakes for Deaf West Theatre (Center Theatre Group, 2007). With this dual performance, wrote TimeOut critic James Sims, "Harvard joins the rank of deaf actors transcending any perceived limitations due to a lack of speaking lines, capturing the heart of the newly created characters with ease." The following year he played (also for Deaf West) Aesop in Aesop Who? In 2007, he assistant directed the young-audience musical Nobody's Perfect.

Harvard won the central role of Billy for the New York premiere of the British comic-drama Tribes after an extensive North American search for an authentically deaf actor who could handle the demands of both signing and speaking dialogue to hearing actors throughout the play. He played the role to acclaim for over 400 performances Off Broadway at the Barrow Street Theatre, where Tribes broke all box-office records there. Critics uniformly praised his acting abilities: "Russell Harvard, himself deaf, turns in a powerful performance that ranges from adept romantic comedy to quiet sadness and heartbreaking anger" (Erik Haagensen, backstage.com); "[Harvard is] terrific in charting forms and degrees of a private communication" (Ben Brantley, The New York Times); "[Harvard] transforms almost effortlessly from sweetness to bitterness, all the while making us aware of both Billy's pain and strength" (Brian Scott Lipton, TheaterMania.com). John Lahr of The New Yorker assessed this NY debut stage performance thus:

As Billy, Russell Harvard, who is deaf, brings an extraordinary restrained sweetness to the role. He's handsome, alert, and sensitive, and, without any mawkishness, he manages to convey the bravery both of Billy's resilience and of his rebellion.

Harvard recreated the role in the NY production's transfer to the Mark Taper Forum in Los Angeles in spring 2013, and later that summer at La Jolla Playhouse in San Diego. On June 15, 2015, L.A. Theatre Works released an audio CD of Tribes, featuring Harvard and other original-cast members.

On August 10, 2015, Playbill.com announced the casting of Harvard for the Broadway company of Deaf West's revival production of the Duncan Sheik-Steven Sater musical Spring Awakening. This transfer production, which opened at the Brooks Atkinson Theatre on September 27, 2015, marked the Broadway debuts of both Harvard and co-star Marlee Matlin.

On February 28, 2019, Harvard opened at the Cort Theatre on Broadway as the Duke of Cornwall in Shakespeare's King Lear, with Glenda Jackson in the title role. His presence in the role involved an interpreter for the deaf as an onstage character, signing to him and speaking most of his lines to the others when he signed back. He used his vocal skills to speak a few of his character's lines in moments of high emotion; in his death scene, the interpreter emerged as the servant who opposes and fatally wounds him, and their confrontation was done entirely in sign language.

From November 5, 2019, to March 11, 2020, Harvard assumed the roles of Link Deas and Boo Radley in Bartlett Sher's long-running production of Aaron Sorkin's To Kill a Mockingbird on Broadway. The company gave a special performance, offered free to 18,000 New York City public middle and high school students, at Madison Square Garden on February 26, 2020. The city outbreak of COVID-19 in mid-March forced the production into hiatus until its reopening on October 5, 2021, when Harvard returned with original cast members Jeff Daniels and Celia Keenan-Bolger. The production closed officially on January 16, 2022.

Harvard performed the principal role of the jailer "Rocco" in Beethoven's opera Fidelio in a unique coproduction between Deaf West Theatre and the Los Angeles Philharmonic at Walt Disney Concert Hall from April 14–16, 2022. He signed the role in tandem with bass-baritone Ryan Speedo Green's singing, led by conductor Gustavo Dudamel. That September, he starred in Jenny Koons's acclaimed production of Oedipus in a Deaf West Theatre collaboration with the Getty Villa in Pacific Palisades, CA. Critics' comments included: "As portrayed by the brave, sensitive, and fiery actor Russell Harvard, righteous and sensitive Oedipus knows he is the obvious choice to rescue Thebes . . . This still youthful king and undisputed hero rules with magisterial pride"; "Harvard presents a fascinating take on the doomed king, a man bristling with anger that he easily unleashes on everyone . . ."; and "the star quality this seasoned performer brings is impossible to deny.".

When not performing professionally, he teaches theater and directs plays at Texas School for the Deaf. He has staged several high school musical productions, including Grease and The Wizard of Oz.

=== Music and dance ===
In interviews, Harvard has expressed his lifelong passion for music, which he performs both live at Deaf cultural events and in amateur videos. He enjoys popularity on YouTube where he posts video recordings of himself performing American sign language renditions of contemporary songs. His versatile interpretive styles range from rock, pop ballad, rap and hip hop to dance-pop, alternative rock and synthpop. Harvard is also, along with Jessica (JessKay) von Garrel, Sabrina Valencia and Jesse Jones III, a founding member of the hip hop Deaf dance troupe HipZu Funk, based in Austin, US.

=== Advocacy ===
On May 26, 2010, Harvard testified as a panel witness before the U.S. Senate Subcommittee on Communications, Technology and the Internet in a hearing entitled "Innovation and Inclusion: The Americans with Disabilities Act at 20", which focused on the issues raised by the Equal Access to Communications in the 21st Century Act. Testifying on behalf of the National Association of the Deaf and the Coalition of Organizations for Accessible Technology (COAT), he argued the need for Congress to pass new legislation to require closed captioning on video programming on the Internet just as it had done for television broadcasting in 1990:

Closed captioning has made a huge impact on the lives of every deaf or hard of hearing person, including me. Captions allow me to be in sync with what is going on in the world. They let me watch television with my family and friends. They enable me to get the information I need to develop and share my views on political campaigns. They let me keep pace with current trends and maintain my independence and my sense of dignity.

He explained that all modern devices, regardless of screen size, should have caption capability and easy activation controls. Because so few programming distributors currently offer Internet captioning, "we now find that when we turn to that video programming on the Internet, we are again left behind, unable to understand what is going on." He closed by calling on Congress "not to leave us behind as new Internet and digital video programming technologies become available to the general public."

Harvard has also been a strong proponent of exploring ways in which Deaf entertainment practitioners can work more independently to produce work for stage and screen. He envisions more creative uses of communication technology in the artistic process and in providing greater accessibility to Deaf audiences. He also hopes to see an expanding range and type of film and TV acting roles in which Deaf professional performers may be cast: "We need writers and casting directors to be fearless in working with actors who happen to be deaf."

== Filmography ==
=== Film ===
Year	Title	Role	Notes
2007	Signage	Jonathan's friend	Short
2007	There Will Be Blood	H.W.	Feature film debut
2008	S Is for Sexy	Jonathan's friend	Video anthology incl. Signage
2009	Gerald	Corey	ASL Films feature
2010	Words	Owen	Short
2010	The Hammer	Matt Hamill	aka Hamill - USA (original title)
2011	Claustrophobia	Tim	
2011	Versa Effect	Seth	ASL Films feature
2013	This Is Normal	Alex	Short
2017	Here We Are	Trevor	
2018	The Pastman	The Pastman	Short
2022	Far West		Short
2022	Causeway	Justin	
2026	Being Heumann	Olin Fortney	
TBA	Flash Before the Bang		Post-production

=== Television ===
Year	Title	Role	Notes
2006	CSI: NY	Cole Rowen	episode: "Silent Night"
2010	Fringe	Joe	episode: "The Box"
2014–2017	Fargo	Mr. Wrench	Season 1: 7 episodes Season 3: 4 episodes
2015	Switched at Birth	Julian Stanton	episode: "Player's Choice"
2015	Odd Mom Out	Sebastian	episode: "Omakase"

== Theatre ==
Year	Play	Role	Production	Notes
2007	Sleeping Beauty Wakes	Orderly / Groundskeeper's Son	Deaf West Theatre, Los Angeles, CA	
2008	Aesop Who?	Aesop	Deaf West Theatre, Los Angeles, CA	
2012 - 2013	Tribes	Billy	Barrow Street Theatre, NYC	
2012 - 2013	Tribes	Billy	Mark Taper Forum, Los Angeles, CA	
2012 - 2013	Tribes	Billy	La Jolla Playhouse, San Diego, CA	
2015 - 2016	Spring Awakening (Broadway revival)	Headmaster Knochenbruch / Herr Steifel / Father Kaulbach	Brooks Atkinson Theatre, NYC	Production by Deaf West Theatre
2016	I Was Most Alive with You	Knox	Huntington Theatre Company, Boston, MA	
2016	The Who's Tommy	Tommy	Open Circle Theatre, Silver Spring, MD	
2017	Edward Albee's at Home at the Zoo	Jerry	Wallis Annenberg Center for the Performing Arts, Beverly Hills, CA	
2017	Our Town	Mr. Webb	Deaf West Theatre, Pasadena Playhouse, Pasadena, CA	
2018	I Was Most Alive with You	Knox	Playwrights Horizons, NYC	
2019	King Lear	Duke of Cornwall	Cort Theatre, NYC	
2019	To Kill a Mockingbird	Link Deas / Boo Radley	Schubert Theatre, NYC	Replacement, November 5, 2019, to March 11, 2020; then October 5, 2021, to January 16, 2022
2022	Fidelio	Rocco	Deaf West Theatre, LA Phil, Walt Disney Concert Hall, LA, CA	
2022	Oedipus	Oedipus	Deaf West Theatre, Getty Villa, Pacific Palisades, CA	

== Awards and nominations ==
Year	Work	Award	Category	Result
2012	Tribes	Theatre World Award	Outstanding Debut Performance	Won
2012	Tribes	Lucille Lortel Award	Outstanding Lead Actor in a Play	Nominated
2012	Tribes	Drama League Award	Outstanding Lead Actor in a Play	Nominated
2012	Tribes	Outer Critics Circle Award	Outstanding Lead Actor in a Play	Nominated
2019	I Was Most Alive with You	Lucille Lortel Award	Outstanding Lead Actor in a Play	Nominated
2019	I Was Most Alive with You	Drama Desk Award	Outstanding Actor in a Play	Nominated
