= Fargo (TV series) =

American crime anthology series

- Genre: Anthology; Crime drama; Noir; Thriller; Black comedy
- Created by: Noah Hawley
- Based on: Fargo by Joel and Ethan Coen
- Showrunner: Noah Hawley
- Starring: Season 1: Billy Bob Thornton; Allison Tolman; Colin Hanks; Martin Freeman; Season 2: Kirsten Dunst; Patrick Wilson; Jesse Plemons; Jean Smart; Ted Danson; Season 3: Ewan McGregor; Carrie Coon; Mary Elizabeth Winstead; Goran Bogdan; David Thewlis; Season 4: Chris Rock; Jessie Buckley; Jason Schwartzman; Ben Whishaw; Jack Huston; Salvatore Esposito; E'myri Crutchfield; Season 5: Juno Temple; Jennifer Jason Leigh; David Rysdahl; Joe Keery; Lamorne Morris; Richa Moorjani; Sam Spruell; Sienna King; Dave Foley; Jon Hamm
- Music by: Jeff Russo
- Country of origin: United States
- Original language: English
- No. of seasons: 5
- No. of episodes: 51 (list of episodes)

Production
- Executive producers: Noah Hawley; Warren Littlefield; Joel Coen; Ethan Coen; Adam Bernstein; Geyer Kosinsk; John Cameron; Leslie Cowan
- Producers: Kim Todd; Chad Oakes; Michael Frislev; Erik Holmberg
- Production locations: Calgary, Alberta (seasons 1–3, 5); Chicago, Illinois (season 4)
- Cinematography: Dana Gonzales; Matthew J. Lloyd
- Running time: 39–68 minutes
- Production companies: Nomadic Pictures (2015); 26 Keys Productions; The Littlefield Company; Mike Zoss Productions (2014–2017); FXP (Note: Credited as FX Productions for the first two seasons); MGM Television

Original release
- Network: FX
- Release: April 15, 2014 – present

Fargo is an American black comedy crime drama television series created by Noah Hawley for FX. It is based on the 1996 film written and directed by Joel and Ethan Coen. The Coens, whose other films also heavily influenced the series, were originally uninvolved but joined as executive producers after being impressed by Hawley's script for the first season. The series premiered on April 15, 2014.

Fargo is an anthology series consisting of self-contained seasons, although they all share the same continuity as the film and feature minor overlaps. Five seasons of the show have been released between 2014 and 2024, each with a different setting, cast and characters; the time periods also largely vary, ranging from 1950 in season four to 2019 in season five, although they all take place in the American Midwest, primarily Minnesota. The storylines differ with each season, but typically follow large casts of characters made up of organized criminals, law enforcement and regular civilians, who stumble into a seemingly minor conflict that quickly spirals into chaos and bloodshed.

The series has received a large number of awards and nominations, mostly for its performances; these include seven Primetime Emmy Awards (including Outstanding Limited Series for its first season) out of 70 nominations, three Golden Globe Awards (including Best Miniseries or Television Film, also for its first season) out of 14 nominations, and eight Critics' Choice Television Awards (including Best Movie/Miniseries twice for its first two seasons) out of 22 nominations.

== Series overview ==
Season	Episodes	Originally released	
Season	Episodes	First released	Last released
1	10	April 15, 2014	June 17, 2014
2	10	October 12, 2015	December 14, 2015
3	10	April 19, 2017	June 21, 2017
4	11	September 27, 2020	November 29, 2020
5	10	November 21, 2023	January 16, 2024

=== Season 1 (2014) ===
In 2006, Lorne Malvo (Billy Bob Thornton) passes through Bemidji, Minnesota, and influences the community—including put-upon insurance salesman Lester Nygaard (Martin Freeman)—with his malice, violence, and deception. Meanwhile, Deputy Molly Solverson (Allison Tolman) and Duluth police officer Gus Grimly (Colin Hanks) team up to solve a series of murders they believe may be linked to Malvo and Nygaard.

The first season, set primarily in Minnesota and North Dakota from January 2006 to February 2007, won the Primetime Emmy Awards for Outstanding Miniseries, Outstanding Directing, and Outstanding Casting, and received 15 additional nominations including Outstanding Writing, another Outstanding Directing nomination, and acting nominations for all four leads. It also won the Golden Globe Awards for Best Miniseries or Television Film and Best Actor – Miniseries or Television Film for Thornton.

=== Season 2 (2015) ===
In 1979, beautician Peggy Blumquist (Kirsten Dunst) and her husband, butcher Ed Blumquist (Jesse Plemons), cover up her hit-and-run of a member of the Gerhardt crime family based in Fargo, North Dakota, led by matriarch Floyd Gerhardt (Jean Smart). Minnesota State Trooper Lou Solverson (Patrick Wilson) and his father-in-law, Rock County Sheriff Hank Larsson (Ted Danson), become entangled with the Blumquists, the Gerhardts, and the Kansas City mafia when they investigate a triple homicide connected to the Gerhardts at a diner in Luverne, Minnesota.

The second season, set in Minnesota, North Dakota, and South Dakota in March 1979, received three Golden Globe nominations, along with several Emmy nominations including Outstanding Miniseries, and acting nominations for Dunst, Plemons, Smart, and recurring guest Bokeem Woodbine.

=== Season 3 (2017) ===
In 2010, St. Cloud probation officer Ray Stussy (Ewan McGregor) and his parolee girlfriend Nikki Swango (Mary Elizabeth Winstead) dream of a better, wealthier life. To achieve this, they attempt to steal a valuable vintage stamp from Ray's more successful older brother, Emmit (also played by McGregor), the self-proclaimed "Parking Lot King of Minnesota". However, their plans backfire, and the couple soon have to hide their involvement in two deaths, including the stepfather of former Eden Valley police chief Gloria Burgle (Carrie Coon). Meanwhile, Emmit wishes to pay back a shady organization he borrowed money from two years ago, but the company Narwhal and its employees, led by V. M. Varga (David Thewlis), have other plans.

The third season, set primarily in Minnesota from 2010 to 2011, premiered on April 19, 2017. Like previous seasons, it received Emmy nominations including Outstanding Miniseries, and acting nominations for McGregor, Coon, and Thewlis. It received three Golden Globe nominations, for Outstanding Limited Series, and McGregor and Thewlis for acting, with McGregor winning in his category.

=== Season 4 (2020) ===
In 1950, the Cannon Limited, led by Loy Cannon (Chris Rock), threaten to usurp the Fadda Family, led by Josto Fadda (Jason Schwartzman), as the ruling crime organization in Kansas City, Missouri. To maintain peace, the groups agree to honor a tradition of trading the youngest sons between the two households. The alliance is jeopardized by the arrival of Josto's brash brother Gaetano (Salvatore Esposito), as well as the unorthodox actions taken by a nurse named Oraetta Mayflower (Jessie Buckley). Meanwhile, Oraetta's teenage neighbor, Ethelrida Pearl Smutny (E'myri Crutchfield), discovers her mortician parents are in debt to the Cannon Limited, which gets her entangled in the criminal activities of Kansas City.

The fourth season, set primarily in Kansas City, Missouri from 1950 to 1951, premiered on September 27, 2020.

=== Season 5 (2023–24) ===
In 2019, Scandia housewife Dorothy "Dot" Lyon (Juno Temple) is kidnapped by Ole Munch (Sam Spruell), but escapes with help from North Dakota State Trooper Witt Farr (Lamorne Morris). When Dot returns home, she claims to her husband Wayne (David Rysdahl) that there was no kidnapping. While Farr and Scandia deputy Indira Olmstead (Richa Moorjani) investigate, Munch comes into conflict with the man who hired him, Roy Tillman (Jon Hamm), the constitutional sheriff of Stark County, North Dakota, and Dot's first husband, whom she fled ten years prior. On top of Tillman, Munch, and the police, Dot must also contend with Wayne's wealthy mother Lorraine (Jennifer Jason Leigh), the CEO of a debt collection agency who suspects Dot faked the kidnapping in order to extort her.

The fifth season, set primarily in Minnesota and North Dakota in late 2019, premiered on November 21, 2023. Like the first three seasons, it was nominated for three Golden Globe Awards for Best Miniseries or Television Film and Best Actor and Actress in a Miniseries or Television Film for Hamm and Temple, respectively.

== Cast and characters ==
=== Season 1 cast ===
- Billy Bob Thornton as Lorne Malvo
- Allison Tolman as Deputy Molly Solverson
- Colin Hanks as Officer Gus Grimly
- Martin Freeman as Lester Nygaard

=== Season 2 cast ===
- Kirsten Dunst as Peggy Blumquist
- Patrick Wilson as State Trooper Lou Solverson
- Jesse Plemons as Ed Blumquist
- Jean Smart as Floyd Gerhardt
- Ted Danson as Sheriff Hank Larsson

=== Season 3 cast ===
- Ewan McGregor as Emmit and Ray Stussy
- Carrie Coon as Gloria Burgle
- Mary Elizabeth Winstead as Nikki Swango
- Goran Bogdan as Yuri Gurka
- David Thewlis as V. M. Varga

=== Season 4 cast ===
- Chris Rock as Loy Cannon
- Jessie Buckley as Oraetta Mayflower
- Jason Schwartzman as Josto Fadda
- Ben Whishaw as Rabbi Milligan
- Jack Huston as Odis Weff
- Salvatore Esposito as Gaetano Fadda
- E'myri Crutchfield as Ethelrida Pearl Smutny
- Andrew Bird as Thurman Smutny
- Anji White as Dibrell Smutny
- Jeremie Harris as Leon Bittle
- Matthew Elam as Lemuel Cannon
- Corey Hendrix as Omie Sparkman
- James Vincent Meredith as Opal Rackley
- Francesco Acquaroli as Ebal Violante
- Gaetano Bruno as Constant Calamita
- Stephen Spencer as Dr. David Harvard
- Karen Aldridge as Zelmare Roulette

=== Season 5 cast ===
- Juno Temple as Dorothy "Dot" Lyon
- Jennifer Jason Leigh as Lorraine Lyon
- David Rysdahl as Wayne Lyon
- Joe Keery as Deputy Gator Tillman
- Lamorne Morris as State Trooper Witt Farr
- Richa Moorjani as Deputy Indira Olmstead
- Sam Spruell as Ole Munch
- Sienna King as Scotty Lyon
- Dave Foley as Danish Graves
- Jon Hamm as Sheriff Roy Tillman

=== Recurring characters ===
List indicators
This table only shows characters that have appeared in multiple seasons and three or more episodes in the series.
A dark grey cell indicates that the character was not in the episode.
An ^{M} indicates the actor was part of the main cast for the season.
An ^{R} indicates the actor was part of the recurring cast for the season.
A ^{G} indicates the actor was part of the guest cast for the season.
An ^{O} indicates a role as an older version of another character.
A ^{Y} indicates a role as a younger version of another character.

Casts of seasons of Fargo
Character	Seasons				
Character	Season 1	Season 2	Season 3	Season 4	Season 5
Mr. Wes Wrench	Russell Harvard^{R}	Corwin Gruter-Andrew^{G}^{Y}	Russell Harvard^{R}		
Lou Solverson	Keith Carradine^{R}	Patrick Wilson^{M} Keith Carradine^{G}			
Molly Solverson	Allison Tolman^{M}	Raven Stewart^{R} Allison Tolman^{G}^{O} Laura Geluch^{G}^{O} Libby Seltzer^{G}^{O}			
Gus Grimly	Colin Hanks^{M}	Colin Hanks^{G}			
Ohanzee "Hanzee" Dent Moses Tripoli	Mark Acheson^{G}	Zahn McClarnon^{M}			
Mr. Grady Numbers	Adam Goldberg^{R}	Artem Fomitchev^{G}^{Y}			
Ben Schmidt	Peter Breitmayer^{R}	Keir O'Donnell^{R}^{Y}			
Mike Milligan Michael "Satchel" Cannon		Bokeem Woodbine^{R}		Rodney L. Jones III^{R} Bokeem Woodbine^{G}^{O}	
Joe Bulo		Brad Garrett^{R}		Evan Mulrooney^{R}	
Gale Kitchen		Brad Mann^{R}		Brad Mann^{G}	

== Production ==
In 1997, a pilot was filmed for an intended television series based on the film. Set in Brainerd shortly after the events of the film, it starred Edie Falco as Marge Gunderson and Bruce Bohne reprising his role as Officer Lou. It was directed by Kathy Bates and featured no involvement from the Coen brothers. The episode aired in 2003, during Trio's Brilliant But Cancelled series of failed TV shows.

In 2012, it was announced that FX, with the Coen brothers as executive producers, was developing a new television series based on the film. It was later announced that adaptation would be a ten-episode limited series. On August 2, 2013, it was announced that Billy Bob Thornton had signed on to star in the series. On September 27, 2013, Martin Freeman also signed on to star. On October 3, 2013, it was announced that Colin Hanks was cast in the role of Duluth police officer Gus Grimly. Production began in late 2013, with filming taking place in and around Calgary, Alberta.

The series is set in the same fictional universe as the film, in which events took place in 1987 between Minneapolis and Brainerd, Minnesota. The first season features the buried ransom money from the film in a minor subplot. Additionally, a number of references are made connecting the series to the film. Dialect coach Tony Alcantar was hired to help Tolman, Freeman and other actors attain the Minnesota accent. Alcantar would go on to coach the stars in every subsequent season, including Richa Moorjani for season five.

Following the series renewal in July 2014, creator Noah Hawley revealed that the second season would take place in 1979 and focus on Sioux Falls, South Dakota, as referred to by Lou Solverson and others in the first season. The ten episodes are set in Luverne, Minnesota; Fargo, North Dakota; and Sioux Falls. Hawley agreed that this takes place before the events of the film, but he believes all the stories connect: "I like the idea that somewhere out there is a big, leather-bound book that's the history of true crime in the Midwest, and the movie was Chapter 4; Season 1 was Chapter 9; and [Season 2] is Chapter 2," he said. "You can turn the pages of this book, and you just find this collection of stories. ... But I like the idea that these things are connected somehow, whether it's linearly or literally or thematically. That's what we play around with." This book was realized in season 2, episode 9, "The Castle". Production on the second season began in Calgary on January 19, 2015, and completed on May 20, 2015.

Production on the third season began in January 2017 in Calgary, Alberta. Production on the fourth season was shut down in March 2020 due to the COVID-19 pandemic. The season was originally scheduled to premiere on April 19, 2020, before the shutdown. Filming resumed on the fourth season in late August 2020, with the season premiering on September 27, 2020.

In February 2022, FX renewed the series for a fifth season. Production for the fifth season began as early as October 2022 in Calgary, Alberta. Filming was reported in High River in December 2022, January 2023, and February 2023. Filming reportedly took place at Didsbury hospital in February, and filming moved to Beiseker on February 27.

In 2025, while promoting the first season of his FX series Alien: Earth, Noah Hawley stated in an interview that he wanted to set and film the sixth season of Fargo in Texas, where he lives with his family. "I want to film it here. I want to do a Texas story. I want to work at home, man. I'll direct half of the episodes if I can do it at home." In 2026, executive producer Warren Littlefield revealed that – despite the series not yet officially being renewed – they hope to have an announcement confirming season six "soon". In the same interview, he revealed that both he and Hawley were still "committed" to the series, and that as long as there's demand for more, they'll continue making them. However, he was not "authorized to confirm or deny" whether or not the season would indeed be set and filmed in Texas.

== "This is a true story" ==
As with the original film, each episode begins with the superimposed text:

This is a true story. The events depicted took place in [location] in [year]. At the request of the survivors, the names have been changed. Out of respect for the dead, the rest has been told exactly as it occurred.

As with the film, this claim is untrue. Showrunner Noah Hawley continued to use the Coens' device, saying it allowed him to "tell a story in a new way". Hawley has played with the realism of the story further; responding to queries about Charlie Gerhardt, a character from season 2, he stated "If he's out there, I'd like to get a letter from him someday, telling me how he turned out."

At the 2017 ATX Television Festival in Austin, Texas, Hawley further discussed the "true story" series tag: "So what does that even mean—the words 'true story'?" he said. "I really wanted to deconstruct that this year." He recalled one of the lines spoken by Sy Feltz, Michael Stuhlbarg's character: "'The world is wrong—it looks like my world but everything is different.' That's what we're exploring this year."

== Release ==
On April 15, 2014, the series made its debut on FX and FXX in Canada; the remaining episodes were shown on FXX. The next day, it premiered in the UK on Channel 4. On May 1, 2014, it premiered on SBS One in Australia, and on SoHo in New Zealand.

Netflix streamed seasons 1–3 in 20 regions between 2015 and 2022.

== Reception ==
=== Critical response ===
Critical response of Fargo
Season	Rotten Tomatoes	Metacritic
1	97% (140 reviews)	85 (40 reviews)
2	100% (233 reviews)	96 (33 reviews)
3	93% (225 reviews)	89 (32 reviews)
4	84% (58 reviews)	68 (37 reviews)
5	93% (55 reviews)	80 (34 reviews)

The first season holds a weighted average score of 85 out of 100 based on 40 reviews on Metacritic, indicating "universal acclaim". The review aggregation website Rotten Tomatoes reported that 97% of 140 critics gave the season a positive review, with an average rating of 8.45/10. The website consensus reads: "Based on the film of the same name in atmosphere, style, and location only, Fargo presents more quirky characters and a new storyline that is expertly executed with dark humor and odd twists." IGN reviewer Roth Cornet gave the first season a 9.7 out of 10 score, praising the casting, its thematic ties to the movie, and the writing. The A.V. Club named it the sixth best TV series of 2014.

The second season received a weighted average score of 96 out of 100 based on 33 reviews on Metacritic. On Rotten Tomatoes, 100% of 233 critics' reviews are positive, with an average rating is 9.1/10. The site's consensus states: "Season two of Fargo retains all the elements that made the series an award-winning hit, successfully delivering another stellar saga powered by fascinating characters, cheeky cynicism, and just a touch of the absurd."

On Metacritic, the third season has a weighted average score of 89 out of 100 based on 32 reviews. Rotten Tomatoes reported a 93% rating based on 225 reviews for the season, with an average rating of 8.5/10. The site's critical consensus is: "Thanks in part to a memorable dual performance from Ewan McGregor, Fargo mostly maintains the sly wit and off-kilter sensibility it displayed in its first two seasons."

Reviews for the fourth season were more mixed, noting the slower pacing of the story. 84% of 58 reviews are positive and the average rating is 7.3/10 on Rotten Tomatoes. The critics consensus for the season is: "Though Fargo's ambitious fourth season struggles to maintain momentum, fine performances and a change of scenery make for an engaging—if uneven—departure from the series' norm." On Metacritic, the season has a weighted average score of 68 out of 100 based on reviews from 37 critics, indicating "generally favorable reviews".

The fifth season has 55 reviews on Rotten Tomatoes, 93% of which are positive; the average rating is 8.5/10. The site's critics consensus reads: "A back-to-basics caper populated by the likes of a mesmerizing Juno Temple and a thick slice of Hamm, Fargo's fifth season is a superb return to peak form." On Metacritic, the season has a weighted average score of 80 out of 100 based on 34 critics, indicating "generally favorable reviews".

=== Accolades ===
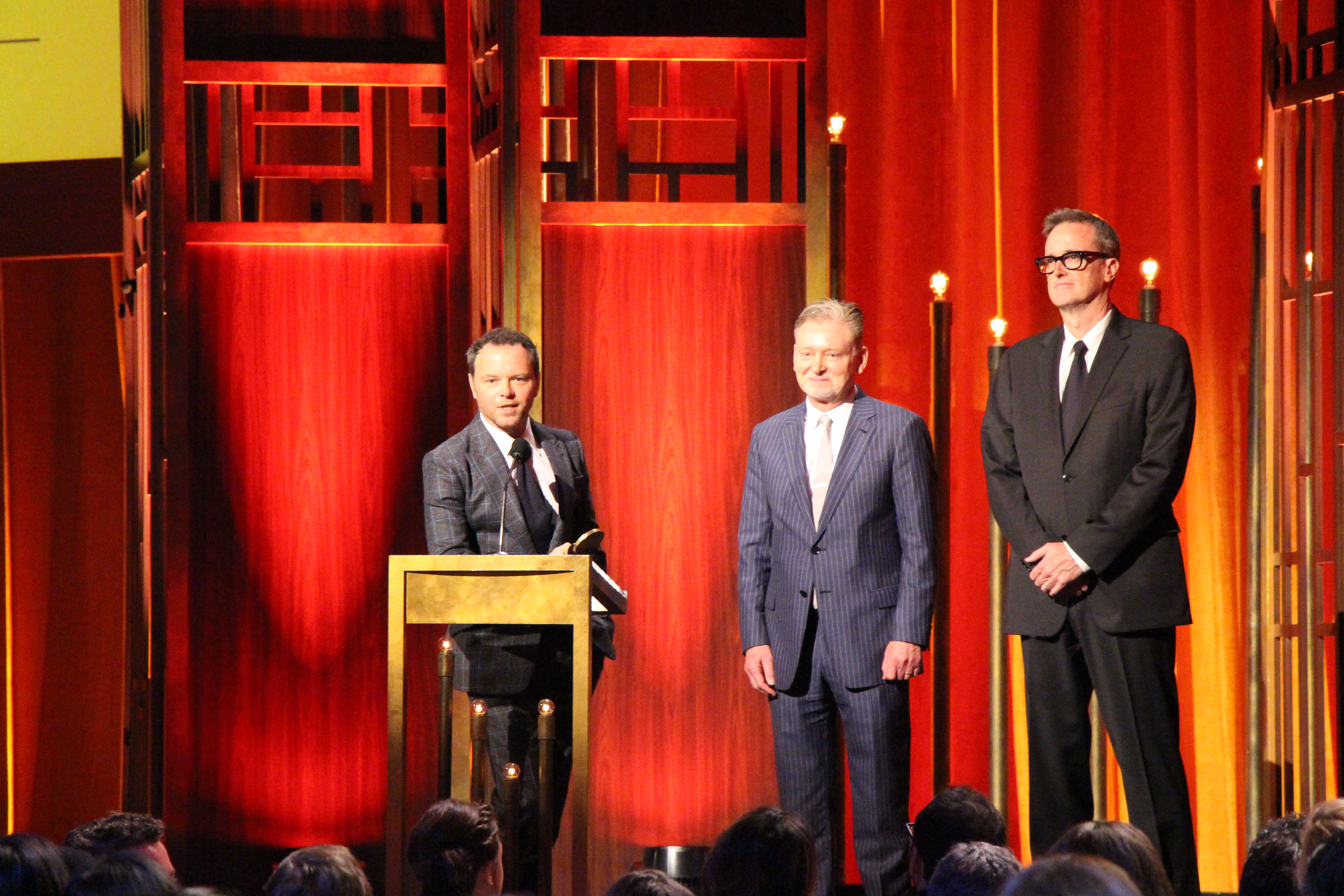
Noah Hawley, Warren Littlefield and John Cameron at the 74th Peabody Awards

Fargo has won 51 of its 226 award nominations. The first season garnered 8 Primetime Emmy Award nominations, with the show itself winning the Outstanding Miniseries and director Colin Bucksey winning the Outstanding Directing for a Miniseries, Movie or a Dramatic Special. It received an additional 10 Creative Arts Emmy Award nominations, winning for Outstanding Casting for a Miniseries, Movie, or Special. It has received eight Golden Globe Award nominations, with the show winning for Best Miniseries or Television Film, and Billy Bob Thornton winning for Best Actor in a Miniseries or Television Film. The series has also received one Screen Actors Guild Award nomination to Billy Bob Thornton for Outstanding Performance by a Male Actor in a Miniseries or Television Movie.

Additional accolades include: the American Film Institute Award for Top Ten Television Program in 2014 and 2015, the Artios Award for Excellence in Casting, a Peabody Award, seven Critics' Choice Television Awards in which the show won twice for Best Miniseries and five times in acting for Billy Bob Thornton, Allison Tolman, Kirsten Dunst, Jesse Plemons and Jean Smart, the Dorian Awards for TV Drama of the Year, the Golden Reel Award for Best Music Score, two Producers Guild of America Award for Outstanding Producer of Long-Form Television and a Writers Guild of America Awards for Long Form – Adapted.
