= Olivia Sandoval =

American actress

Olivia Sandoval is an American actress, best known for her role as Winnie Lopez, a St. Cloud police officer in Fargo.

She is the daughter of character actor Miguel Sandoval and played his daughter in the television series Medium.

== Filmography ==
=== Film ===
Year	Title	Role	Notes
2009	Repo Chick	Ad Woman	
2016	Man in Ceiling	Kate	Short Film
2018	On Killer Robots	Darlene Dunn	Short Film
2018	A Simple Favor	Ms. Prager	
2022	Fábula	Ana	Short Film
2023	See Saw	Viral (voice)	Short Film
2024	Mecánica	Unknown Role	Short Film

=== Television ===
Year	Title	Role	Notes
2007, 2010	Medium	Arianna Devalos	Episodes: "Very Merry Maggie" and "Dear Dad..."
2014	Futurestates	Miranda	Episode: "Excarcerated"
2015	Bad Judge	Reporter #2	Episode: "Naked and Afraid"
2015	The Odd Couple	Stage Manager	Episode: "Secret Agent Man"
2017	The Real O'Neals	Liz	Episode: "The Real Heartbreak"
2017	Fargo	St. Cloud; Police Officer; Winnie Lopez	7 episodes
2017	Modern Family	Dr. Karen Fisk	Episode: "Tough Love"
2018–2019	For the People	Celia Chavez, Assistant United; States Attorney	8 episodes
2018–2019	Lodge 49	Janet Price	7 episodes
2018	Girls Code		Television Film
2019	Corporate	Molly the Agent	Episode: "The Tragedy"
2019	American Princess	Ynez	Episodes: "Queen Interrupted" and "Fairemily Matters"
2021	Glasscock Park	Ina	2 episodes
2022, 2025	Bosch: Legacy	Deputy District Attorney; Susan Saldaño	3 episodes
2022	The Handmaid's Tale	Lisa	Episode: "Dear Offred"
2025	Good American Family	Melinda Aguilar	Episode: "Right There in Black and White"
2025	High Potential	Jessica Gould	Episode: "Eleven Minutes"
