= Eden Valley, Minnesota =

City in Minnesota, United States

- City
- Location in Stearns County and the state of Minnesota
- Coordinates: 45°19′32″N 94°32′44″W
- Country: United States
- State: Minnesota
- Counties: Meeker, Stearns

Area
  - Total: 1.34 sq mi (3.48 km^{2})
  - Land: 1.34 sq mi (3.47 km^{2})
  - Water: 0.0077 sq mi (0.02 km^{2})
- Elevation: 1,116 ft (340 m)

Population (2020)
  - Total: 1,027
  - Density: 767.5/sq mi (296.35/km^{2})
- Time zone: UTC-6 (Central (CST))
  - Summer (DST): UTC-5 (CDT)
- ZIP code: 55329
- Area code: 320
- FIPS code: 27-18134
- GNIS feature ID: 2394615
- Website: ci.edenvalley.mn.us

Eden Valley is a city in Meeker and Stearns counties in the U.S. state of Minnesota. The population was 1,027 at the 2020 census. Most of Eden Valley is in Meeker County; the Stearns County portion is part of the St. Cloud Metropolitan Statistical Area.

== History ==
Eden Valley was platted in 1886. A post office has been in operation at Eden Valley since 1887.

Eden Valley was founded by a man named Jim Haag. According to WJON (am: 1240, fm 95.3) "Eden Valley was settled in 1886 when the railroad came in. Jim Haag says there was a settlement just 2 miles east of Eden Valley called Logering that was established in the late 1850s." Shortly after the post office began operation, many new businesses began to open such as blacksmiths shop, general stores, farms and eventually gas stations.

The meaning or origin of the name Eden Valley is unclear, but according to WJON "...Jim Haag says the location is in a valley and legend has it that when railroad surveyors came in they compared the location to the garden of Eden and the name took hold."

Due to the high Catholic population Assumption Church was founded in 1897 and is still operating to this day. Assumption Church is not short on its history. Before 1897 Catholic mass was held in the upstairs of a butcher shop. Recently, Assumption has been very dedicated to the pro-life movment and 40 days for life. According to The Central Minnesota Catholic Church "The pro-life movement and 40 Days for Life are heavily promoted. We hold a Baby Needs Drive and donate items to Birthline." Assumption used to connect to a Catholic school which shut down in 1999.

== Geography ==
The city sits on the boundary between Stearns County to the north and Meeker County to the south. The intersection of state highways 22 and Minnesota State Highway 55, is in the southern part of town. Highway 22 leads north 10 miles (16 km) to Richmond and south 14 miles (23 km) to Litchfield, the Meeker county seat. Highway 55 leads east 13 miles (21 km) to Kimball and west-northwest 10 miles (16 km) to Paynesville.

According to the U.S. Census Bureau, Eden Valley has a total area of 1.34 square miles (3.47 km^{2}), of which 0.006 square miles (0.016 km^{2}), or 0.45%, are water. The city is within the Sauk River watershed, which drains northeast to the Mississippi River at St. Cloud.

== Demographics ==
Historical population
Census	Pop.	Note	%±
1890	327		—
1900	604		84.7%
1910	740		22.5%
1920	665		−10.1%
1930	612		−8.0%
1940	716		17.0%
1950	792		10.6%
1960	793		0.1%
1970	776		−2.1%
1980	763		−1.7%
1990	732		−4.1%
2000	866		18.3%
2010	1,042		20.3%
2020	1,027		−1.4%
U.S. Decennial Census

=== 2010 census ===
As of the census of 2010, there were 1,042 people, 434 households, and 262 families living in the city. The population density was 854.1 inhabitants per square mile (329.8/km^{2}). There were 485 housing units at an average density of 397.5 per square mile (153.5/km^{2}). The racial makeup of the city was 96.2% White, 0.4% African American, 0.6% Native American, 0.1% Asian, 0.6% from other races, and 2.2% from two or more races. Hispanic or Latino of any race were 3.2% of the population.

There were 434 households, of which 32.7% had children under the age of 18 living with them, 41.9% were married couples living together, 13.4% had a female householder with no husband present, 5.1% had a male householder with no wife present, and 39.6% were non-families. 33.2% of all households were made up of individuals, and 12.9% had someone living alone who was 65 years of age or older. The average household size was 2.40 and the average family size was 3.01.

The median age in the city was 34.5 years. 27.4% of residents were under the age of 18; 7.5% were between the ages of 18 and 24; 28.8% were from 25 to 44; 21% were from 45 to 64; and 15.4% were 65 years of age or older. The gender makeup of the city was 51.1% male and 48.9% female.

=== 2000 census ===
As of the census of 2000, there were 866 people, 360 households, and 221 families living in the city. The population density was 674.6 inhabitants per square mile (260.5/km^{2}). There were 376 housing units at an average density of 292.9 per square mile (113.1/km^{2}). The racial makeup of the city was 97.81% White, 0.69% African American, 0.35% Native American, 0.58% Asian, 0.58% from other races. Hispanic or Latino of any race were 1.96% of the population.

There were 360 households, out of which 28.9% had children under the age of 18 living with them, 45.0% were married couples living together, 11.1% had a female householder with no husband present, and 38.6% were non-families. 32.5% of all households were made up of individuals, and 16.7% had someone living alone who was 65 years of age or older. The average household size was 2.37 and the average family size was 3.01.

In the city, the population was spread out, with 25.1% under the age of 18, 13.0% from 18 to 24, 26.1% from 25 to 44, 15.5% from 45 to 64, and 20.3% who were 65 years of age or older. The median age was 34 years. For every 100 females, there were 95.9 males. For every 100 females age 18 and over, there were 97.3 males.

The median income for a household in the city was $25,781, and the median income for a family was $39,125. Males had a median income of $29,107 versus $20,227 for females. The per capita income for the city was $13,501. About 9.1% of families and 14.8% of the population were below the poverty line, including 14.2% of those under age 18 and 23.3% of those age 65 or over.
