= 69th Primetime Emmy Awards =

Television awards covering 2016 and 2017

- Promotional poster
- Date: September 17, 2017 (Ceremony); September 9–10, 2017 (Creative Arts Awards)
- Location: Microsoft Theater, Los Angeles, California
- Presented by: Academy of Television Arts and Sciences
- Hosted by: Stephen Colbert

Highlights
- Most awards: Major: Big Little Lies; The Handmaid's Tale (5); All: Saturday Night Live (9)
- Most nominations: Feud: Bette and Joan; Veep (10)
- Outstanding Comedy Series: Veep
- Outstanding Drama Series: The Handmaid's Tale
- Outstanding Limited Series: Big Little Lies
- Website: http://www.emmys.com/

Television/radio coverage
- Network: CBS
- Produced by: Ricky Kirshner; Glenn Weiss
- Directed by: Glenn Weiss

The 69th Primetime Emmy Awards honored the best in American prime time television programming from June 1, 2016, until May 31, 2017, as chosen by the Academy of Television Arts & Sciences. The ceremony was held on Sunday, September 17, 2017, at the Microsoft Theater in Downtown Los Angeles, California, where 27 awards were presented, and was broadcast in the U.S. by CBS. The ceremony was hosted by Stephen Colbert. The 69th Primetime Creative Arts Emmy Awards were held on September 9 and 10, and was broadcast by FXX on September 16.

The nominations were announced by Anna Chlumsky and Shemar Moore on July 13, 2017. Channelwise, the freshman HBO science fiction western drama Westworld and NBC sketch comedy Saturday Night Live were the most nominated programs, each with 22 nominations.

Host Stephen Colbert opened the ceremony with a song-and-dance number and a monologue that lampooned the state of the world under President Donald Trump, which The New York Times said set an anti-Trump tone for the rest of the event. Many of the further presentations and host commentary continued jokes aimed towards Trump, along with winners' speeches criticizing the President and standing behind diversity in the television field. Sean Spicer, Trump's former White House Press Secretary, made an appearance in which he parodied himself. RuPaul played a living Emmy statue in a comedic interview segment with Colbert during the ceremony.

Original programming streaming television services—Netflix and Hulu—upended traditional broadcast television series in several categories. Netflix series earned a total of 20 Primetime Emmy Awards, following only HBO with 29 and leading NBC with 15. Hulu's The Handmaid's Tale became the first web series to win Outstanding Drama Series. Additionally, streaming television also won their first awards for Outstanding Lead Actress in a Drama Series (Elisabeth Moss for The Handmaid's Tale – Hulu), Outstanding Guest Actress in a Drama Series (Alexis Bledel for The Handmaid's Tale – Hulu), (Note: Awarded the weekend before at the Primetime Creative Arts Emmy Awards) Outstanding Writing for a Drama Series (Bruce Miller for The Handmaid's Tale – Hulu), Outstanding Television Movie (Black Mirror: San Junipero – Netflix) and Outstanding Writing for a Limited Series, Movie or Dramatic Special (Charlie Brooker for Black Mirror: San Junipero – Netflix).

In addition, the night saw several other historic firsts: Donald Glover became the first African-American to win Outstanding Directing for a Comedy Series for Atlanta. Riz Ahmed, with his win for Outstanding Lead Actor in a Limited Series or Movie for The Night Of, became the first Asian to win that category as well as the first Asian man to win an acting award and first South Asian to win a lead acting award.

Moreover, Ahmed and Dave Chappelle also became the first Muslims to win acting awards, with Ahmed being the first Muslim to win a lead acting award and Chappelle the first to win for a guest role for Saturday Night Live. With Aziz Ansari and Lena Waithe winning Outstanding Writing for a Comedy Series for Master of None, Waithe became the first African-American woman to win that award. Finally, Julia Louis-Dreyfus won her record sixth consecutive award for Outstanding Lead Actress in a Comedy Series for the same category for the same role in a single series as Selina Meyer on Veep; she is now tied with Cloris Leachman for the most wins as a performer.

The awards ceremony drew 11.4 million viewers, on par with the previous awards ceremony, but one of the lowest viewerships for the Primetime Emmy Awards overall. Analysts attribute this to younger audiences preferring to watch clips or summaries than the entire event and to Florida markets being affected by Hurricane Irma.

== Winners and nominees ==
Winners are listed first, highlighted in boldface, and indicated with a double dagger (‡). (Note: The outlets listed for each program are the U.S. broadcasters or streaming services identified in the nominations, which for some international productions are different from the broadcaster(s) that originally commissioned the program.) For simplicity, producers who received nominations for program awards, as well as nominated writers for Outstanding Writing for a Variety Series, have been omitted.

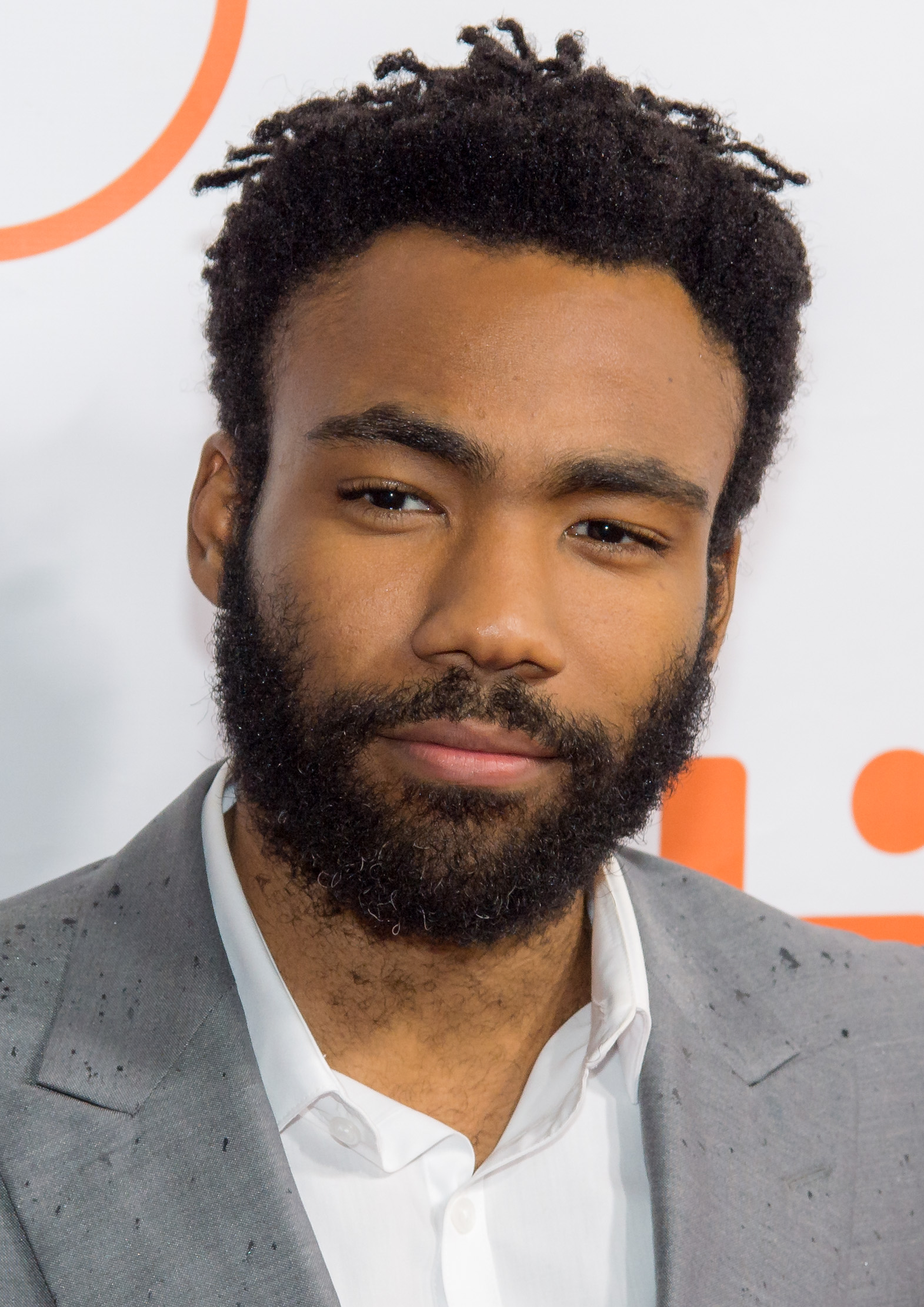
Donald Glover, Outstanding Lead Actor in a Comedy Series winner

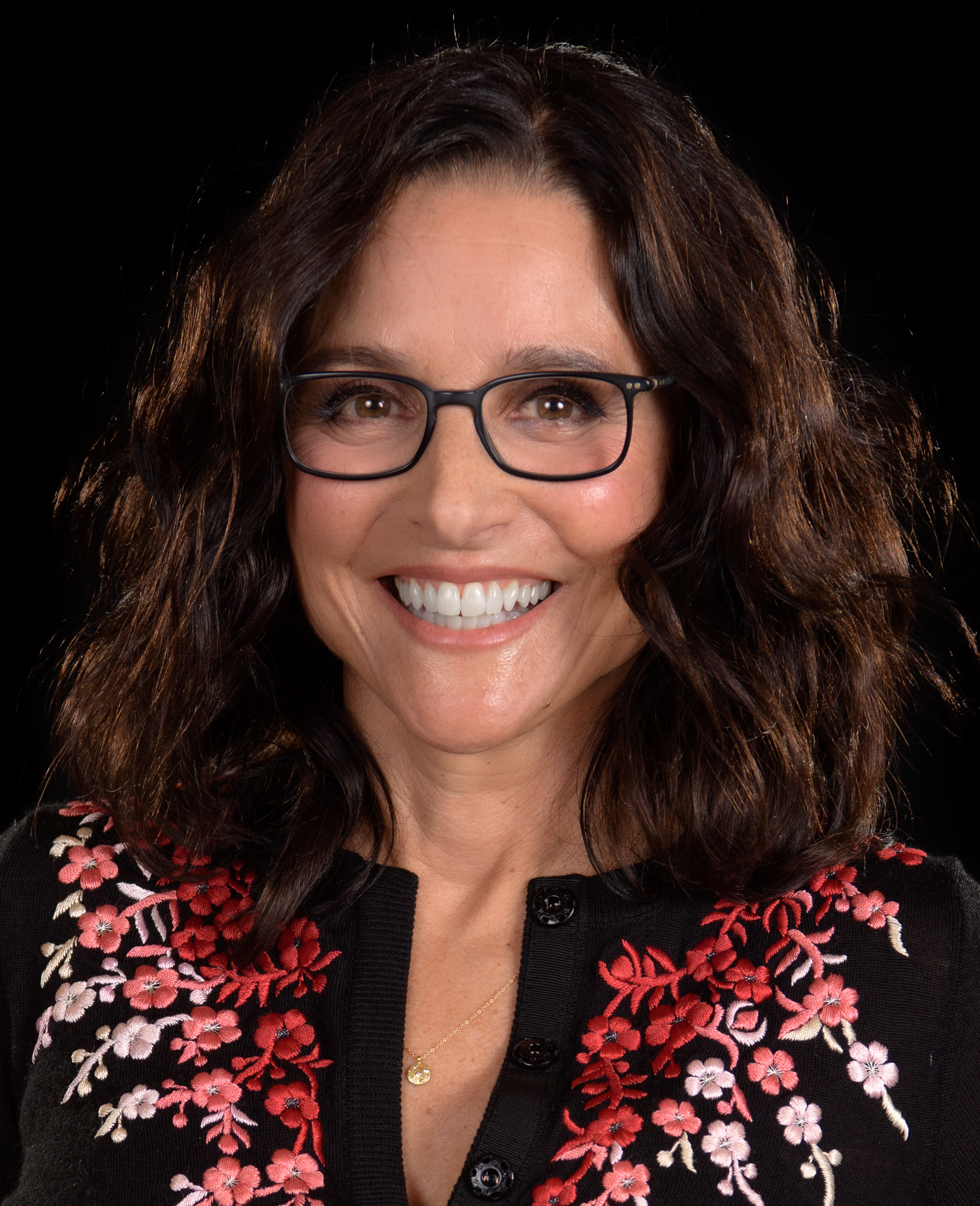
Julia Louis-Dreyfus, Outstanding Lead Actress in a Comedy Series winner

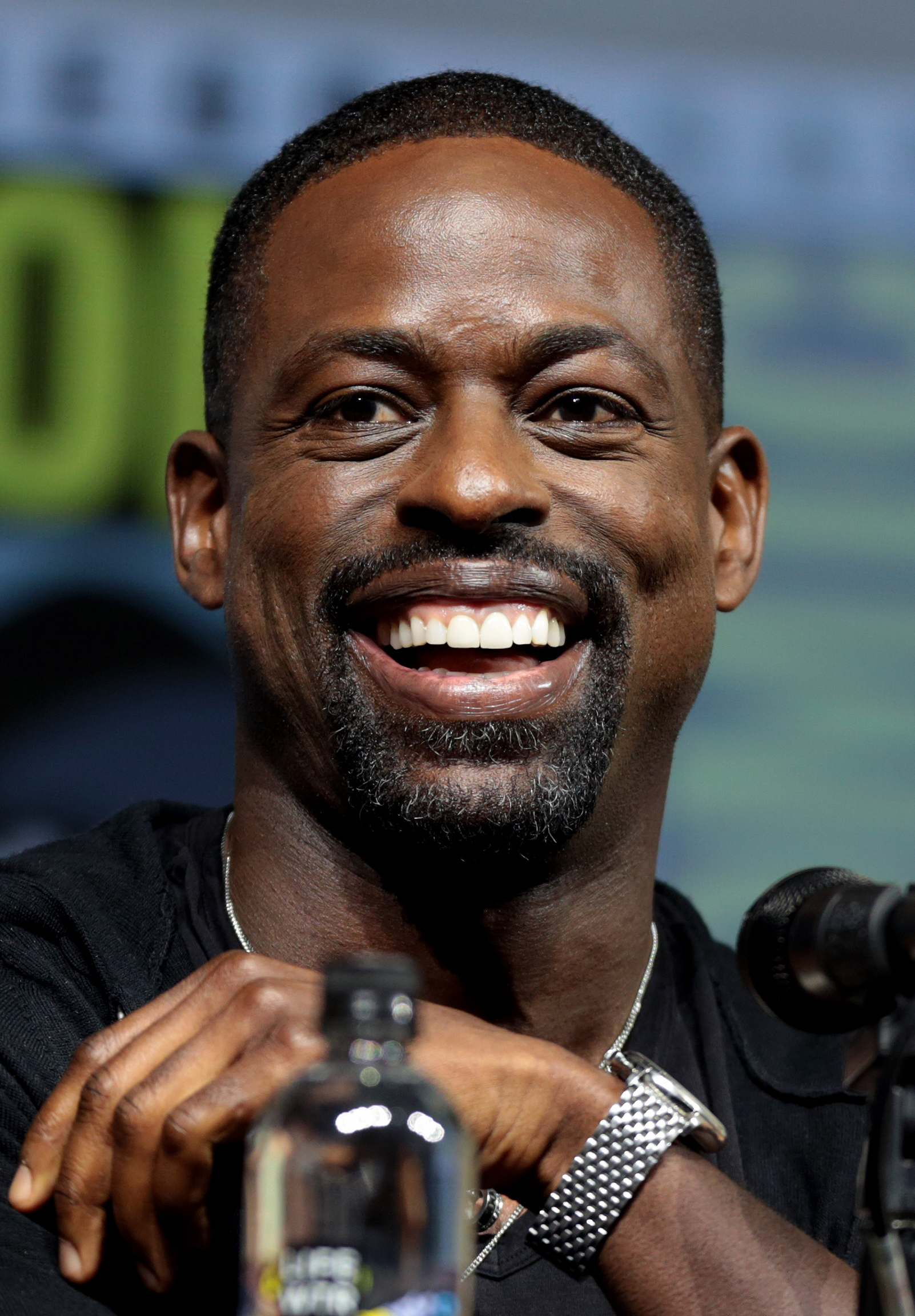
Sterling K. Brown, Outstanding Lead Actor in Drama Series winner

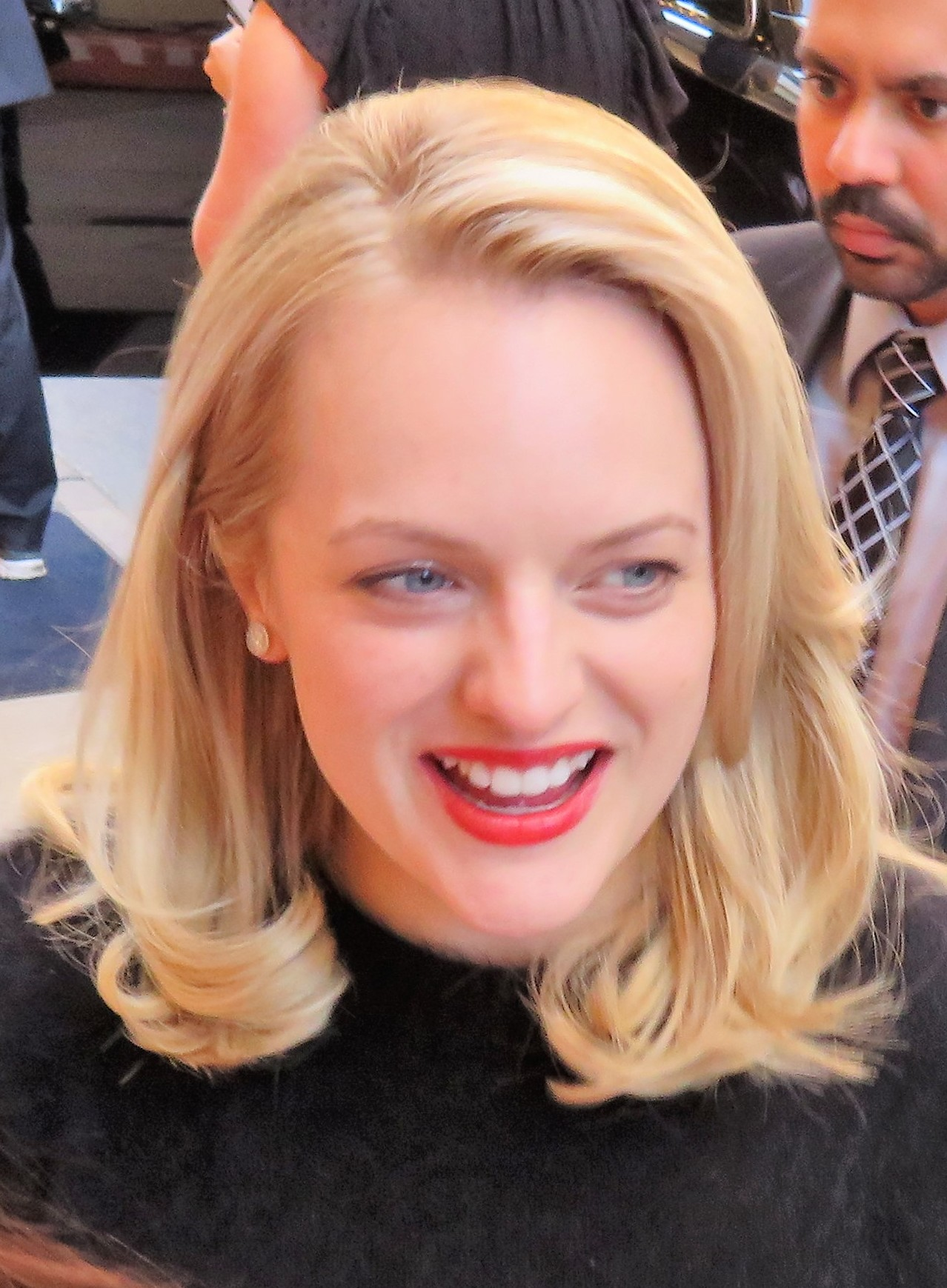
Elisabeth Moss, Outstanding Lead Actress in a Drama Series winner

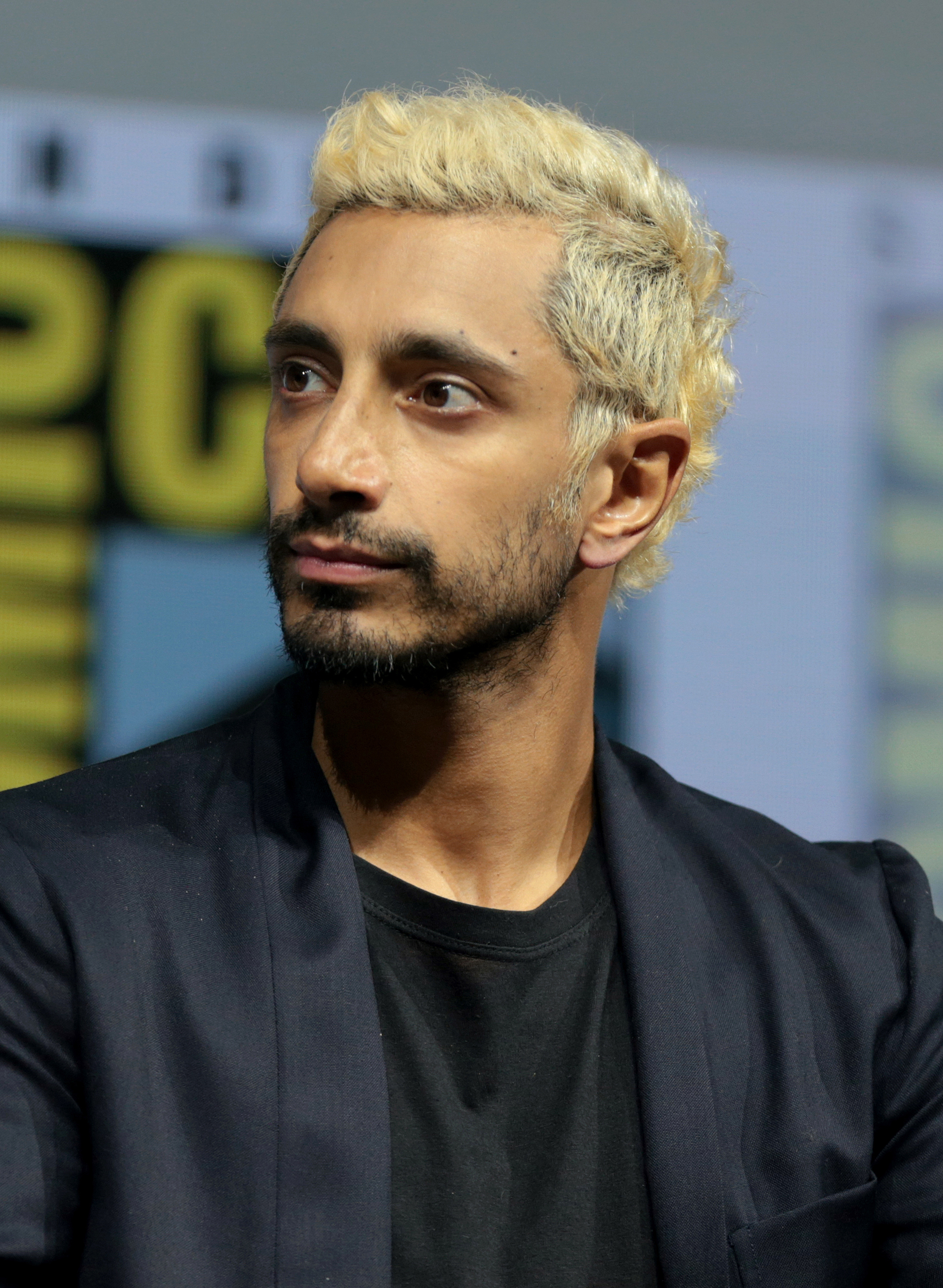
Riz Ahmed, Outstanding Lead Actor in a Limited Series or Movie winner

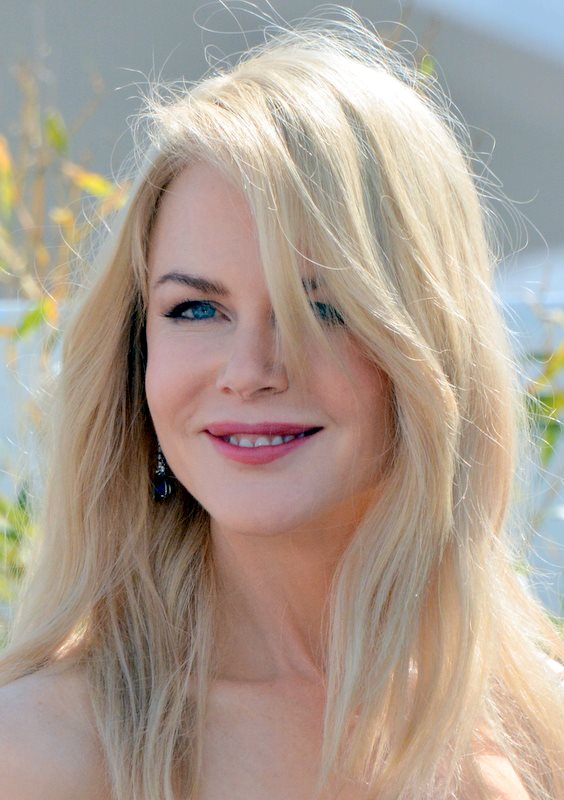
Nicole Kidman, Outstanding Lead Actress in a Limited Series or Movie winner

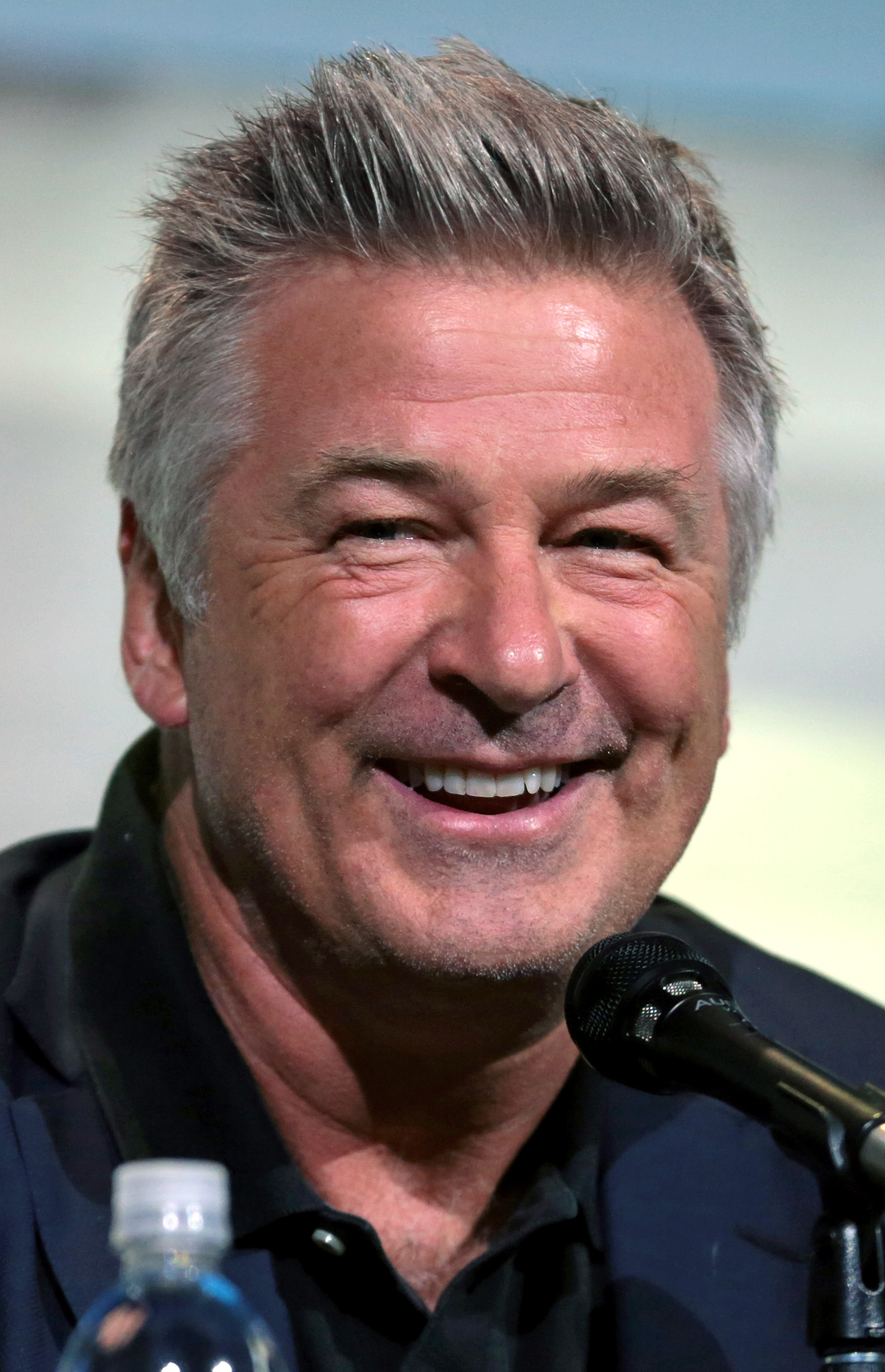
Alec Baldwin, Outstanding Supporting Actor in a Comedy Series winner

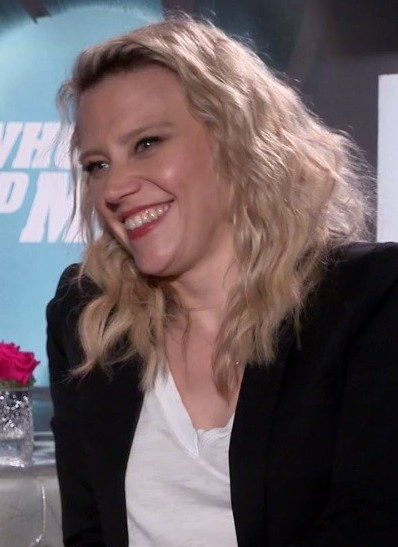
Kate McKinnon, Outstanding Supporting Actress in a Comedy Series winner

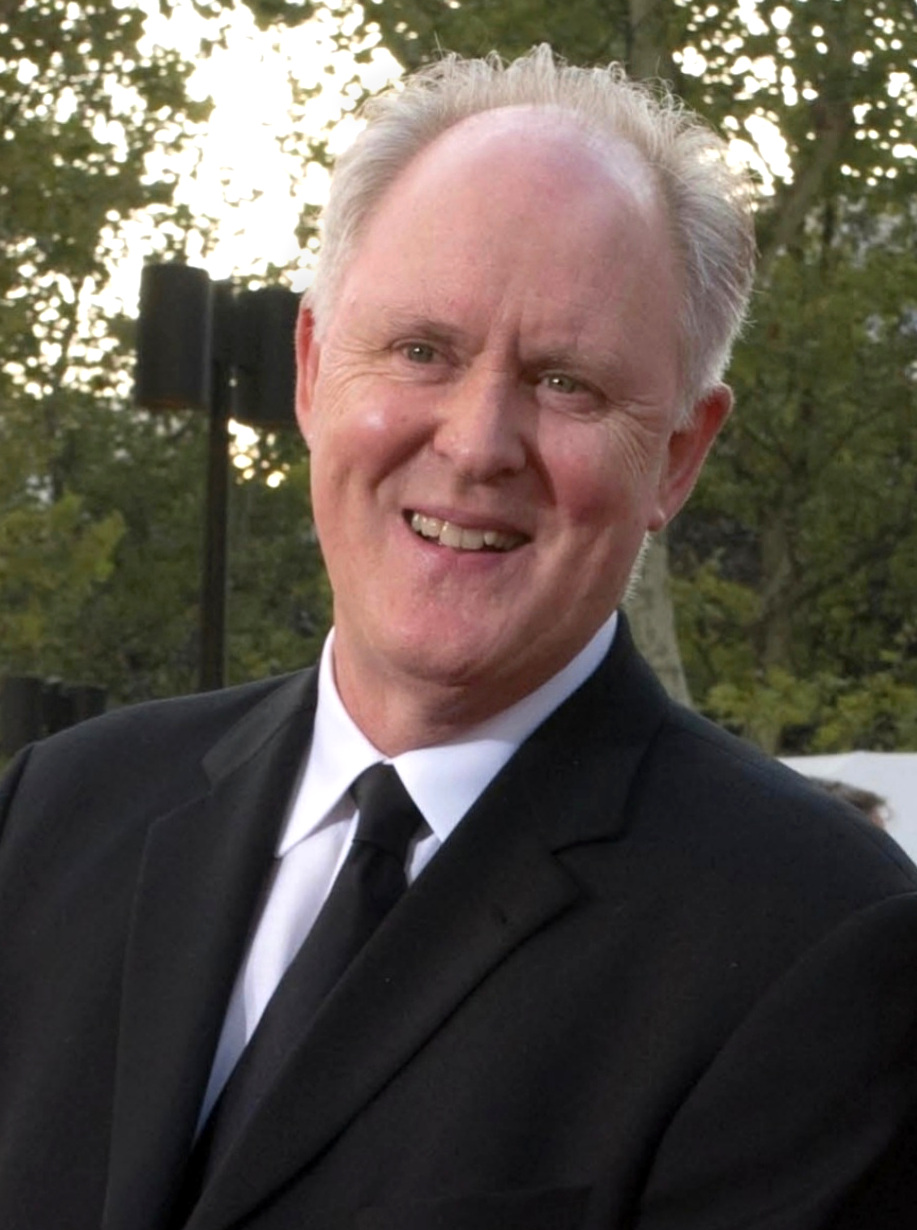
John Lithgow, Outstanding Supporting Actor in a Drama Series winner

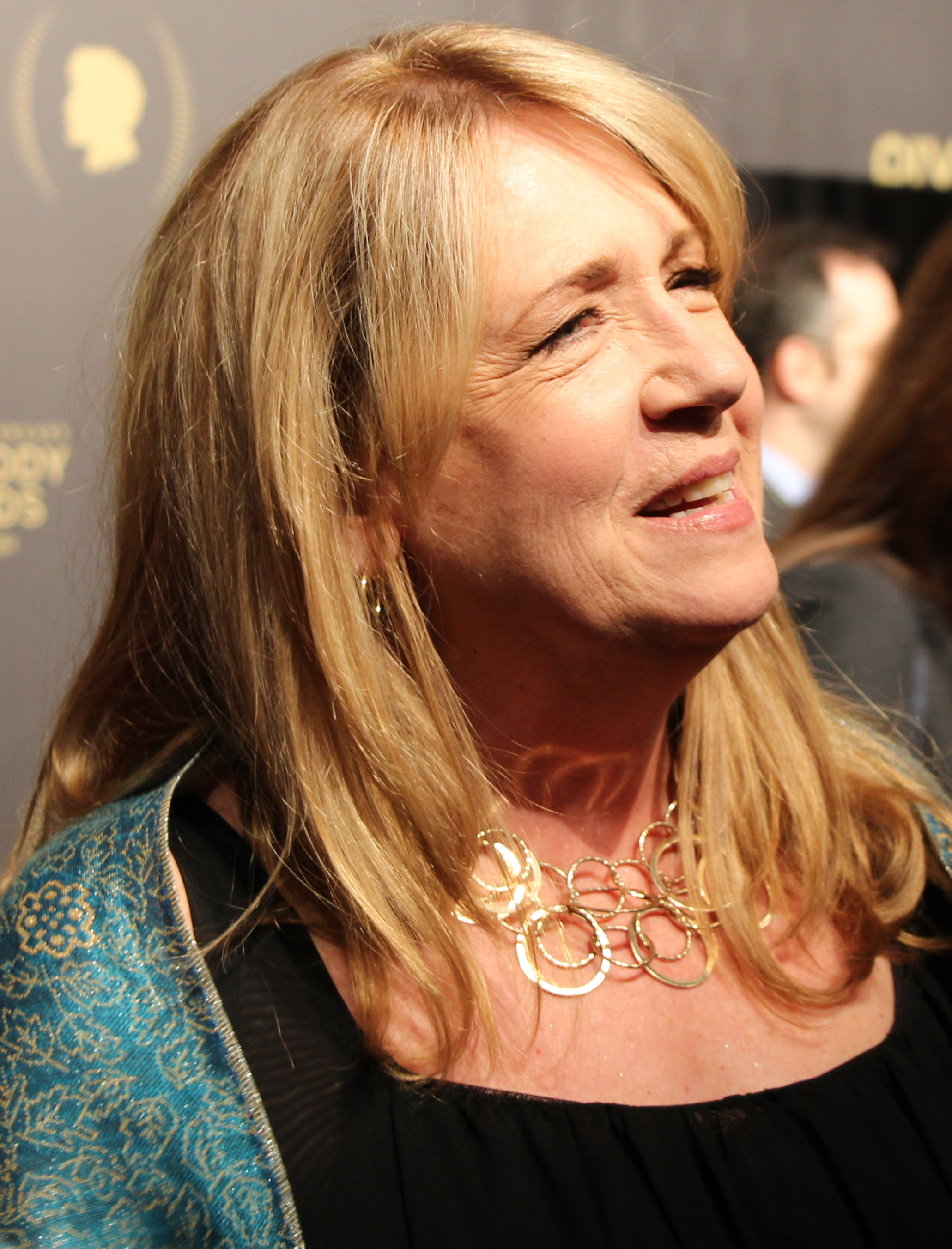
Ann Dowd, Outstanding Supporting Actress in a Drama Series winner

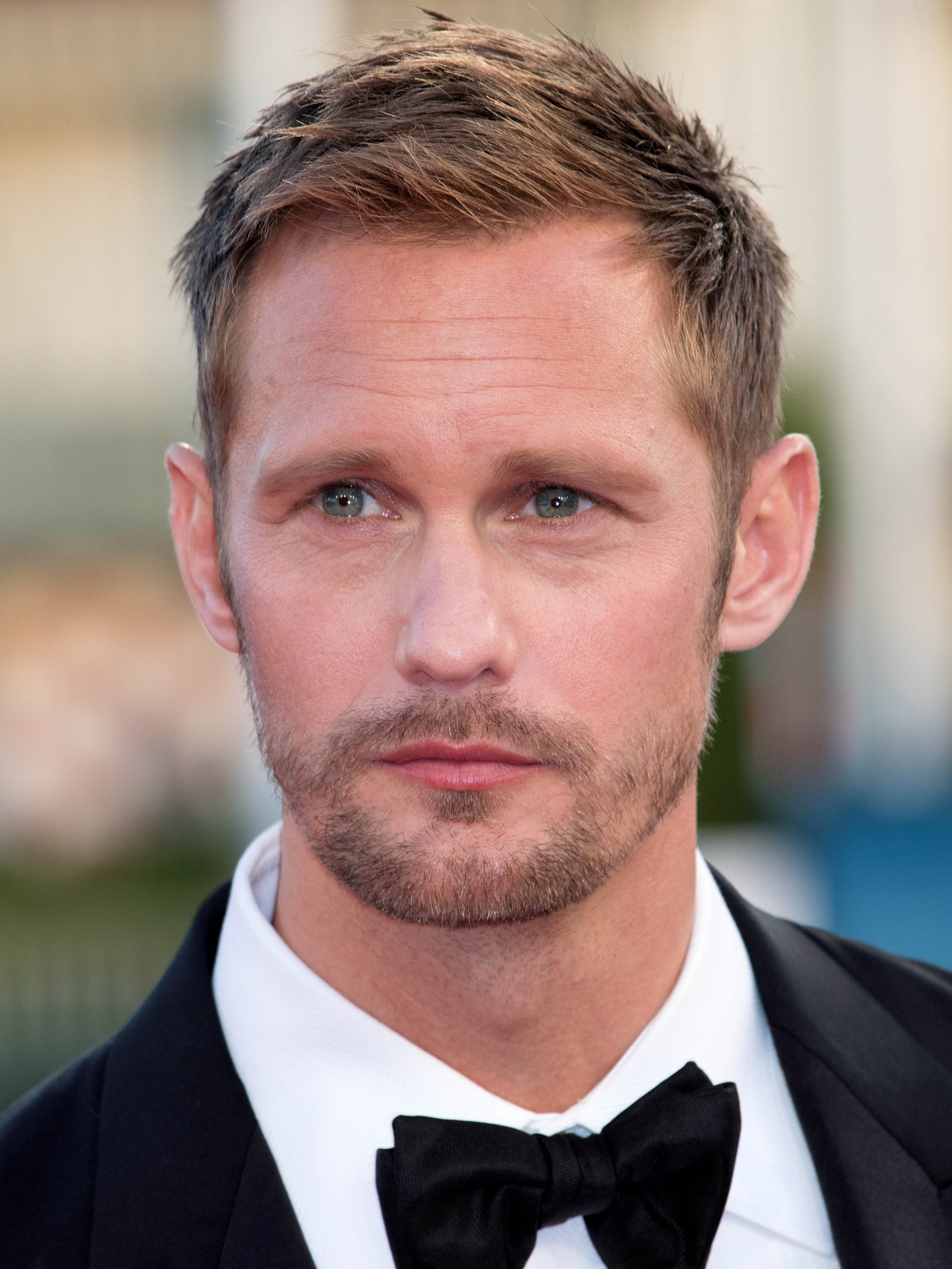
Alexander Skarsgård, Outstanding Supporting Actor in a Limited Series or Movie winner

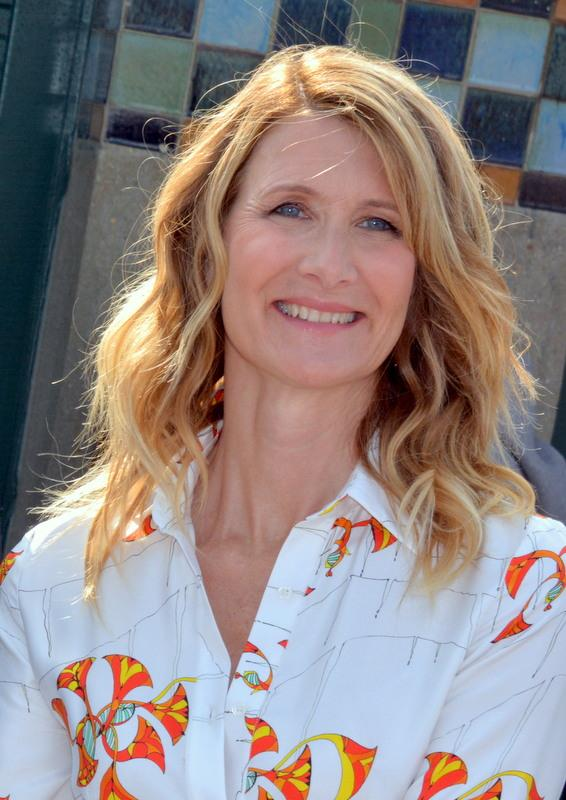
Laura Dern, Outstanding Supporting Actress in a Limited Series or Movie winner

=== Programs ===
Programs
**Outstanding Comedy Series**: **Veep (HBO)**‡; Atlanta (FX); Black-ish (ABC); Master of None (Netflix); Modern Family (ABC); Silicon Valley (HBO); Unbreakable Kimmy Schmidt (Netflix)	**Outstanding Drama Series**: **The Handmaid's Tale (Hulu)**‡; Better Call Saul (AMC); The Crown (Netflix); House of Cards (Netflix); Stranger Things (Netflix); This Is Us (NBC); Westworld (HBO)
**Outstanding Variety Talk Series**: **Last Week Tonight with John Oliver (HBO)**‡; Full Frontal with Samantha Bee (TBS); Jimmy Kimmel Live! (ABC); The Late Late Show with James Corden (CBS); The Late Show with Stephen Colbert (CBS); Real Time with Bill Maher (HBO)	**Outstanding Variety Sketch Series**: **Saturday Night Live (NBC)**‡; Billy on the Street (truTV); Documentary Now! (IFC); Drunk History (Comedy Central); Portlandia (IFC); Tracey Ullman's Show (HBO)
**Outstanding Limited Series**: **Big Little Lies (HBO)**‡; Fargo (FX); Feud: Bette and Joan (FX); Genius (Nat Geo); The Night Of (HBO)	**Outstanding Television Movie**: **Black Mirror: San Junipero (Netflix)**‡; Dolly Parton's Christmas of Many Colors: Circle of Love (NBC); The Immortal Life of Henrietta Lacks (HBO); Sherlock: The Lying Detective (PBS); The Wizard of Lies (HBO)
**Outstanding Reality-Competition Program**: **The Voice (NBC)**‡; The Amazing Race (CBS); American Ninja Warrior (NBC); Project Runway (Lifetime); RuPaul's Drag Race (VH1); Top Chef (Bravo)

=== Acting ===
==== Lead ====
Lead performances
**Outstanding Lead Actor in a Comedy Series**: **Donald Glover – Atlanta as Earnest "Earn" Marks (FX)**‡; Anthony Anderson – Black-ish as Andre "Dre" Johnson Sr. (ABC); Aziz Ansari – Master of None as Dev Shah (Netflix); Zach Galifianakis – Baskets as Chip Baskets and Dale Baskets (FX); William H. Macy – Shameless as Frank Gallagher (Showtime); Jeffrey Tambor – Transparent as Maura Pfefferman (Amazon)	**Outstanding Lead Actress in a Comedy Series**: **Julia Louis-Dreyfus – Veep as Selina Meyer (HBO)**‡; Pamela Adlon – Better Things as Sam Fox (FX); Jane Fonda – Grace and Frankie as Grace Hanson (Netflix); Allison Janney – Mom as Bonnie Plunkett (CBS); Ellie Kemper – Unbreakable Kimmy Schmidt as Kimmy Schmidt (Netflix); Tracee Ellis Ross – Black-ish as Dr. Rainbow "Bow" Johnson (ABC); Lily Tomlin – Grace and Frankie as Frankie Bergstein (Netflix)
**Outstanding Lead Actor in a Drama Series**: **Sterling K. Brown – This Is Us as Randall Pearson (NBC)**‡; Anthony Hopkins – Westworld as Dr. Robert Ford (HBO); Bob Odenkirk – Better Call Saul as Jimmy McGill (AMC); Matthew Rhys – The Americans as Philip Jennings (FX); Liev Schreiber – Ray Donovan as Ray Donovan (Showtime); Kevin Spacey – House of Cards as President Frank Underwood (Netflix); Milo Ventimiglia – This Is Us as Jack Pearson (NBC)	**Outstanding Lead Actress in a Drama Series**: **Elisabeth Moss – The Handmaid's Tale as June Osborne / Offred (Hulu)**‡; Viola Davis – How to Get Away with Murder as Annalise Keating (ABC); Claire Foy – The Crown as Queen Elizabeth II (Netflix); Keri Russell – The Americans as Elizabeth Jennings (FX); Evan Rachel Wood – Westworld as Dolores Abernathy (HBO); Robin Wright – House of Cards as Claire Underwood (Netflix)
**Outstanding Lead Actor in a Limited Series or Movie**: **Riz Ahmed – The Night Of as Nasir "Naz" Khan (HBO)**‡; Benedict Cumberbatch – Sherlock: The Lying Detective as Sherlock Holmes (PBS); Robert De Niro – The Wizard of Lies as Bernie Madoff (HBO); Ewan McGregor – Fargo as Ray Stussy and Emmit Stussy (FX); Geoffrey Rush – Genius as Albert Einstein (Nat Geo); John Turturro – The Night Of as John Stone (HBO)	**Outstanding Lead Actress in a Limited Series or Movie**: **Nicole Kidman – Big Little Lies as Celeste Wright (HBO)**‡; Carrie Coon – Fargo as Gloria Burgle (FX); Felicity Huffman – American Crime as Jeanette Hesby (ABC); Jessica Lange – Feud: Bette and Joan as Joan Crawford (FX); Susan Sarandon – Feud: Bette and Joan as Bette Davis (FX); Reese Witherspoon – Big Little Lies as Madeline Martha Mackenzie (HBO)

==== Supporting ====
Supporting performances
**Outstanding Supporting Actor in a Comedy Series**: **Alec Baldwin – Saturday Night Live as Donald Trump (NBC)**‡; Louie Anderson – Baskets as Christine Baskets (FX); Tituss Burgess – Unbreakable Kimmy Schmidt as Titus Andromedon (Netflix); Ty Burrell – Modern Family as Phil Dunphy (ABC); Tony Hale – Veep as Gary Walsh (HBO); Matt Walsh – Veep as Mike McLintock (HBO)	**Outstanding Supporting Actress in a Comedy Series**: **Kate McKinnon – Saturday Night Live as various characters (NBC)**‡; Vanessa Bayer – Saturday Night Live as various characters (NBC); Anna Chlumsky – Veep as Amy Brookheimer (HBO); Kathryn Hahn – Transparent as Raquel Fein (Amazon); Leslie Jones – Saturday Night Live as various characters (NBC); Judith Light – Transparent as Shelly Pfefferman (Amazon)
**Outstanding Supporting Actor in a Drama Series**: **John Lithgow – The Crown as Winston Churchill (Netflix)**‡; Jonathan Banks – Better Call Saul as Mike Ehrmantraut (AMC); David Harbour – Stranger Things as Jim Hopper (Netflix); Ron Cephas Jones – This Is Us as William H. Hill (NBC); Michael Kelly – House of Cards as Doug Stamper (Netflix); Mandy Patinkin – Homeland as Saul Berenson (Showtime); Jeffrey Wright – Westworld as Bernard Lowe (HBO)	**Outstanding Supporting Actress in a Drama Series**: **Ann Dowd – The Handmaid's Tale as Aunt Lydia (Hulu)**‡; Uzo Aduba – Orange Is the New Black as Suzanne "Crazy Eyes" Warren (Netflix); Millie Bobby Brown – Stranger Things as Jane "Eleven" Ives (Netflix); Chrissy Metz – This Is Us as Kate Pearson (NBC); Thandie Newton – Westworld as Maeve Millay (HBO); Samira Wiley – The Handmaid's Tale as Moira (Hulu)
**Outstanding Supporting Actor in a Limited Series or Movie**: **Alexander Skarsgård – Big Little Lies as Perry Wright (HBO)**‡; Bill Camp – The Night Of as Dennis Box (HBO); Alfred Molina – Feud: Bette and Joan as Robert Aldrich (FX); David Thewlis – Fargo as V. M. Varga (FX); Stanley Tucci – Feud: Bette and Joan as Jack L. Warner (FX); Michael K. Williams – The Night Of as Freddy Knight (HBO)	**Outstanding Supporting Actress in a Limited Series or Movie**: **Laura Dern – Big Little Lies as Renata Klein (HBO)**‡; Judy Davis – Feud: Bette and Joan as Hedda Hopper (FX); Jackie Hoffman – Feud: Bette and Joan as Mamacita (FX); Regina King – American Crime as Kimara Walters (ABC); Michelle Pfeiffer – The Wizard of Lies as Ruth Madoff (HBO); Shailene Woodley – Big Little Lies as Jane Chapman (HBO)

=== Directing ===
Directing
**Outstanding Directing for a Comedy Series**: **Atlanta: "B.A.N." – Donald Glover (FX)**‡; Silicon Valley: "Intellectual Property" – Jamie Babbit (HBO); Silicon Valley: "Server Error" – Mike Judge (HBO); Veep: "Blurb" – Morgan Sackett (HBO); Veep: "Groundbreaking" – David Mandel (HBO); Veep: "Justice" – Dale Stern (HBO)	**Outstanding Directing for a Drama Series**: **The Handmaid's Tale: "Offred" – Reed Morano (Hulu)**‡; Better Call Saul: "Witness" – Vince Gilligan (AMC); The Crown: "Hyde Park Corner" – Stephen Daldry (Netflix); The Handmaid's Tale: "The Bridge" – Kate Dennis (Hulu); Homeland: "America First" – Lesli Linka Glatter (Showtime); Stranger Things: "Chapter One: The Vanishing of Will Byers" – The Duffer Brothers (Netflix); Westworld: "The Bicameral Mind" – Jonathan Nolan (HBO)
**Outstanding Directing for a Variety Series**: **Saturday Night Live: "Host: Jimmy Fallon" – Don Roy King (NBC)**‡; Drunk History: "Hamilton" – Jeremy Konner and Derek Waters (Comedy Central); Jimmy Kimmel Live!: "The (RED) Show" – Andy Fisher (ABC); Last Week Tonight with John Oliver: "Multi-Level Marketing" – Paul Pennolino (HBO); The Late Show with Stephen Colbert: "Episode 0179" – Jim Hoskinson (CBS)	**Outstanding Directing for a Limited Series, Movie or Dramatic Special**: **Big Little Lies – Jean-Marc Vallée (HBO)**‡; Fargo: "The Law of Vacant Places" – Noah Hawley (FX); Feud: Bette and Joan: "And the Winner Is... (The Oscars of 1963)" – Ryan Murphy (FX); Genius: "Einstein: Chapter One" – Ron Howard (Nat Geo); The Night Of: "The Art of War" – James Marsh (HBO); The Night Of: "The Beach" – Steven Zaillian (HBO)

=== Writing ===
Writing
**Outstanding Writing for a Comedy Series**: **Master of None: "Thanksgiving" – Aziz Ansari and Lena Waithe (Netflix)**‡; Atlanta: "B.A.N." – Donald Glover (FX); Atlanta: "Streets on Lock" – Stephen Glover (FX); Silicon Valley: "Success Failure" – Alec Berg (HBO); Veep: "Georgia" – Billy Kimball (HBO); Veep: "Groundbreaking" – David Mandel (HBO)	**Outstanding Writing for a Drama Series**: **The Handmaid's Tale: "Offred" – Bruce Miller (Hulu)**‡; The Americans: "The Soviet Division" – Joel Fields and Joe Weisberg (FX); Better Call Saul: "Chicanery" – Gordon Smith (AMC); The Crown: "Assassins" – Peter Morgan (Netflix); Stranger Things: "Chapter One: The Vanishing of Will Byers" – The Duffer Brothers (Netflix); Westworld: "The Bicameral Mind" – Lisa Joy and Jonathan Nolan (HBO)
**Outstanding Writing for a Variety Series**: **Last Week Tonight with John Oliver (HBO)**‡; Full Frontal with Samantha Bee (TBS); Late Night with Seth Meyers (NBC); The Late Show with Stephen Colbert (CBS); Saturday Night Live (NBC)	**Outstanding Writing for a Limited Series, Movie or Dramatic Special**: **Black Mirror: San Junipero – Charlie Brooker (Netflix)**‡; Big Little Lies – David E. Kelley (HBO); Fargo: "The Law of Vacant Places" – Noah Hawley (FX); Feud: Bette and Joan: "And the Winner Is... (The Oscars of 1963)" – Ryan Murphy (FX); Feud: Bette and Joan: "Pilot" – Jaffe Cohen, Michael Zam, and Ryan Murphy (FX); The Night Of: "The Call of the Wild" – Richard Price and Steven Zaillian (HBO)

== Most major nominations ==
Networks with multiple major nominations (Note: "Major" constitutes the categories listed above: Program, Acting, Directing, and Writing. Does not include the technical categories.)
Network	No. of Nominations
HBO	46
FX	27
Netflix	27
NBC	17
ABC	11
CBS	7
Hulu	7
Showtime	6
AMC	5
TBS	4
Amazon	3

Programs with multiple major nominations
Program	Category	Network	No. of Nominations
Feud: Bette and Joan	Limited	FX	10
Veep	Comedy	HBO	10
Big Little Lies	Limited	HBO	8
The Night Of	Limited	HBO	8
The Handmaid's Tale	Drama	Hulu	7
Saturday Night Live	Variety Sketch	NBC	7
Westworld	Drama	HBO	7
Fargo	Limited	FX	6
Atlanta	Comedy	FX	5
Better Call Saul	Drama	AMC	5
The Crown	Drama	Netflix	5
Stranger Things	Drama	Netflix	5
This Is Us	Drama	NBC	5
House of Cards	Drama	Netflix	4
Silicon Valley	Comedy	HBO	4
The Americans	Drama	FX	3
Black-ish	Comedy	ABC	3
Genius	Limited	NatGeo	3
Last Week Tonight with John Oliver	Variety Talk	HBO	3
The Late Show with Stephen Colbert	Variety Talk	CBS	3
Master of None	Comedy	Netflix	3
Transparent	Comedy	Amazon	3
Unbreakable Kimmy Schmidt	Comedy	Netflix	3
The Wizard of Lies	Movie	HBO	3
American Crime	Limited	ABC	2
Baskets	Comedy	FX	2
Black Mirror: San Junipero	Movie	Netflix	2
Drunk History	Variety Sketch	Comedy Central	2
Full Frontal with Samantha Bee	Variety Talk	TBS	2
Grace and Frankie	Comedy	Netflix	2
Homeland	Drama	Showtime	2
Jimmy Kimmel Live!	Variety Talk	ABC	2
Modern Family	Comedy	ABC	2
Sherlock: The Lying Detective	Movie	PBS	2

== Most major awards ==
Networks with multiple major awards
Network	No. of Awards
HBO	10
NBC	6
Hulu	5
Netflix	4
FX	2

Programs with multiple major awards
Program	Category	Network	No. of Awards
Big Little Lies	Limited	HBO	5
The Handmaid's Tale	Drama	Hulu	5
Saturday Night Live	Variety Sketch	NBC	4
Atlanta	Comedy	FX	2
Black Mirror: San Junipero	Movie	Netflix	2
Last Week Tonight with John Oliver	Variety Talk	HBO	2
Veep	Comedy	HBO	2

== Presenters and performers ==
The awards were presented by the following:

=== Presenters ===
Name(s)	Role
Jermaine Fowler	Announcer for the 69th Annual Primetime Emmy Awards
Laura Dern; Nicole Kidman; Zoë Kravitz; Reese Witherspoon; Shailene Woodley	Presenters of the award for Outstanding Supporting Actor in a Drama Series
Shemar Moore; Gina Rodriguez	Presenters of the award for Outstanding Supporting Actress in a Comedy Series
Riz Ahmed; Issa Rae	Presenters of the award for Outstanding Supporting Actress in a Limited Series or Movie
Dave Chappelle; Melissa McCarthy	Presenters of the award for Outstanding Directing for a Comedy Series
Anna Faris; Allison Janney	Presenters of the award for Outstanding Variety Sketch Series
LL Cool J Gabrielle Union	Presenters of the award for Outstanding Writing for a Drama Series
James Corden; Seth Meyers	Presenters of the award for Outstanding Supporting Actor in a Comedy Series
Alexis Bledel; Gerald McRaney	Presenters of the award for Outstanding Directing for a Limited Series, Movie or Dramatic Special
Jane Fonda; Dolly Parton; Lily Tomlin	Presenters of the award for Outstanding Supporting Actor in a Limited Series or Movie
Kaitlin Olson; Tracee Ellis Ross	Presenters of the award for Outstanding Writing for a Variety Series
Sonequa Martin-Green; Jeremy Piven	Presenters of the award for Outstanding Supporting Actress in a Drama Series
Hayma Washington	Introducer of a special presentation highlighting diversity and inclusion in television
Iain Armitage; Jim Parsons	Presenters of the award for Outstanding Writing for a Comedy Series
Lea Michele; Kumail Nanjiani	Presenters of the award for Outstanding Reality-Competition Program
Mark Feuerstein; Rashida Jones	Presenters of the award for Outstanding Directing for a Drama Series
Seth MacFarlane; Emmy Rossum	Presenters of the award for Outstanding Writing for a Limited Series, Movie or Dramatic Special
Viola Davis	Presenter of the In Memoriam tribute
Craig Robinson; Adam Scott	Presenters of the award for Outstanding Directing for a Variety Series
Anthony Anderson; Priyanka Chopra	Presenters of the award for Outstanding Variety Talk Series
Alec Baldwin; Edie Falco	Presenters of the award for Outstanding Lead Actor in a Comedy Series
Chris Hardwick; Debra Messing	Presenters of the award for Outstanding Lead Actress in a Comedy Series
Carol Burnett; Norman Lear	Presenters of the award for Outstanding Comedy Series
Jessica Biel; Joseph Fiennes	Presenters of the award for Outstanding Lead Actor in a Limited Series or Movie
Jason Bateman; Sarah Paulson	Presenters of the award for Outstanding Lead Actress in a Limited Series or Movie
Matt Bomer; BD Wong	Presenters of the award for Outstanding Television Movie
Anika Noni Rose; Cicely Tyson	Presenters of the award for Outstanding Limited Series
Dennis Quaid; Kyra Sedgwick	Presenters of the award for Outstanding Lead Actor in a Drama Series
Tatiana Maslany; Jeffrey Dean Morgan	Presenters of the award for Outstanding Lead Actress in a Drama Series
Oprah Winfrey	Presenter of the award for Outstanding Drama Series

=== Performers ===
Name(s)	Performed
Stephen Colbert; Chance the Rapper; Millie Bobby Brown; Julia Louis-Dreyfus; Tony Hale; Keri Russell; Matthew Rhys	"Everything is Better on TV"
Christopher Jackson	"As"

== In Memoriam ==
Broadway actor Christopher Jackson performed Stevie Wonder's "As" as images of television personalities who died in the past year were shown in the following order.

- Glen Campbell
- June Foray
- Ed Greene
- John Bernecker
- Mike Connors
- Zsa Zsa Gabor
- Chuck Barris
- Chris Bearde
- Brad Grey
- Frank Konigsberg
- Powers Boothe
- Jeannie Gunn
- Adam West
- John Heard
- Gary Glasberg
- Roger Ailes
- Agnes Nixon
- Robert Osborne
- Jay Thomas
- Nelsan Ellis
- Mark Schlegel
- Norman Brokaw
- Marsh McCall
- Don Ohlmeyer
- Robert Vaughn
- Bill Paxton
- Roger Moore
- Carrie Fisher
- Debbie Reynolds
- John Hurt
- Gwen Ifill
- Grant Tinker
- Stanley Kallis
- Sandy Gallin
- Miguel Ferrer
- Martin Landau
- Richard Hatch
- Alan Thicke
- Florence Henderson
- Jerry Lewis
- Don Rickles
- Mary Tyler Moore
