= Useless invention =

Useless invention may refer to:

- An invention that is nonpatentable due to its lack of utility
- Chindōgu
- Useless machine
- Rube Goldberg invention
