= Useless machine =

Device only intended to turn itself off

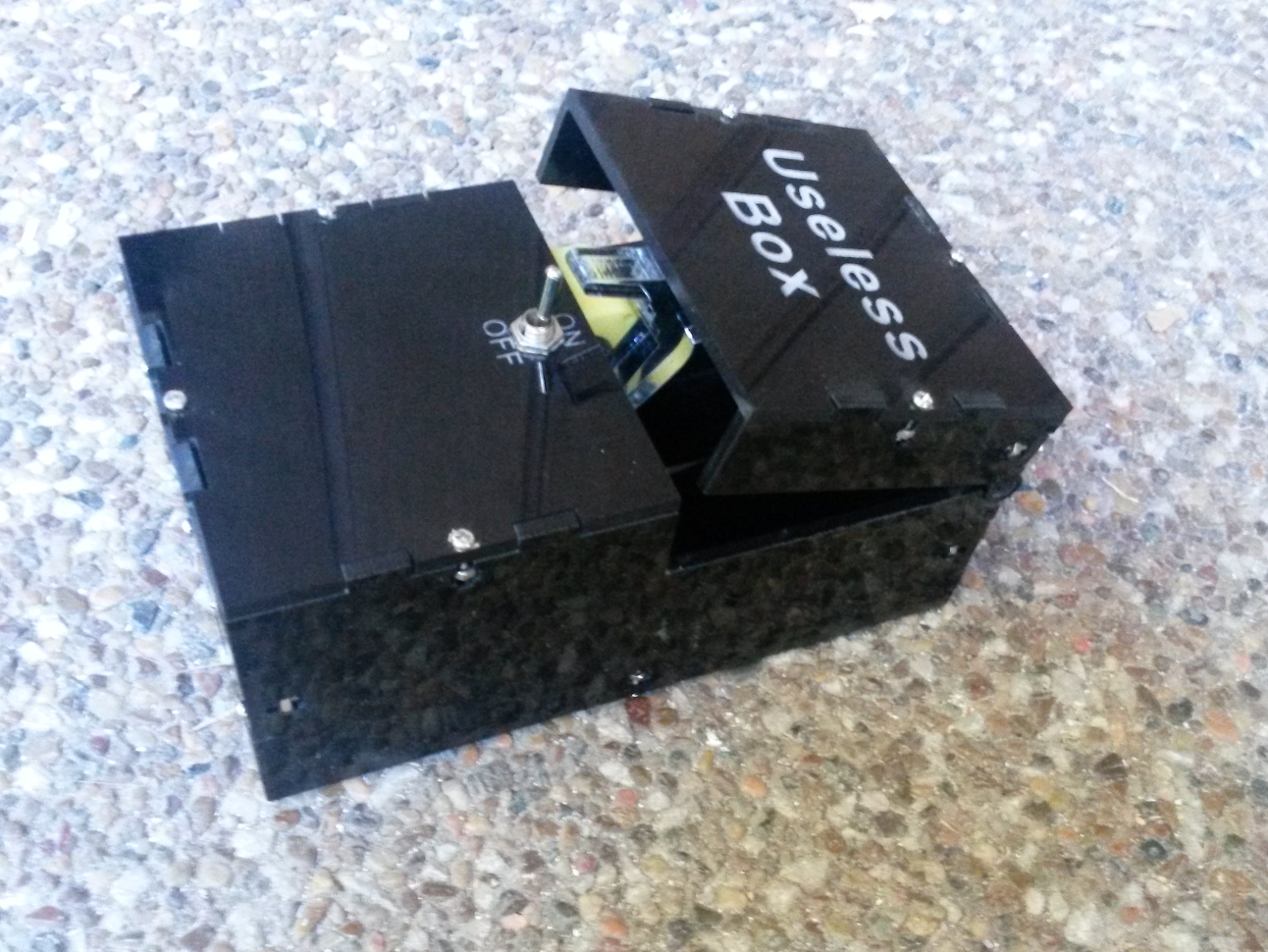
A modern "useless machine" about to turn itself off

A useless machine or useless box is a device whose only function is to turn itself off. The best-known useless machines are those inspired by Marvin Minsky's design, in which the device's sole function is to switch itself off by operating its own "off" switch. Such machines were popularized commercially in the 1960s and sold as an amusing engineering hack or as a joke.

More elaborate devices and some novelty toys, which have an obvious entertainment function, have been based on these simple useless machines.

== History ==
The Italian artist Bruno Munari began building "useless machines" (macchine inutili) in the 1930s. He was a "third generation" Futurist and did not share the first generation's boundless enthusiasm for technology but sought to counter the threats of a world under machine rule by building machines that were artistic and unproductive.

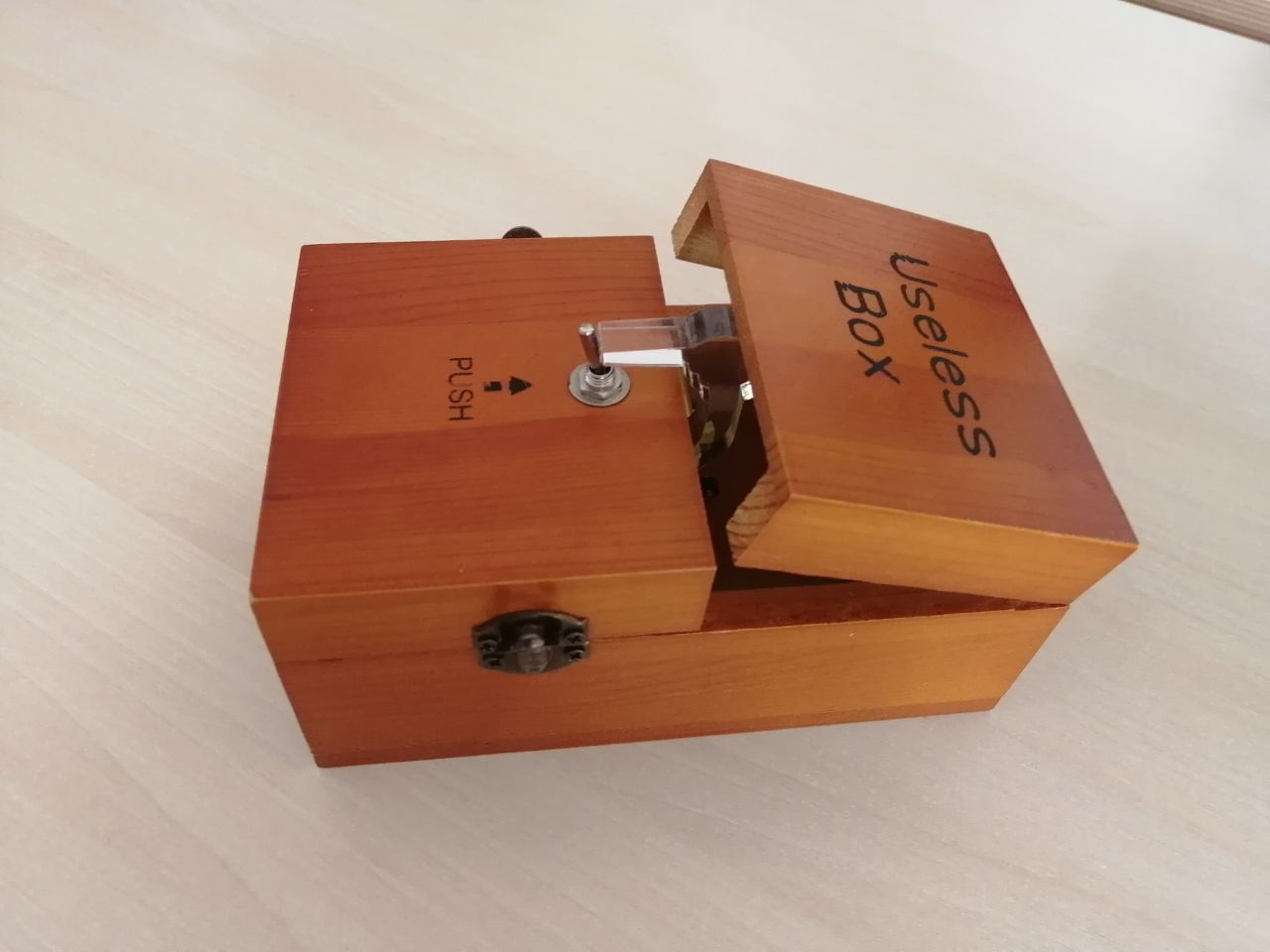
A wooden "useless box"

The version of the useless machine that became famous in information theory (basically a box with a simple switch which, when turned "on", causes a hand or lever to appear from inside the box that switches the machine "off" before disappearing inside the box again) appears to have been invented by MIT professor and artificial intelligence pioneer Marvin Minsky, while he was a graduate student at Bell Labs in 1952. Minsky dubbed his invention the "ultimate machine", but this nomenclature did not catch on. The device has also been called the "Leave Me Alone Box".

Minsky's mentor at Bell Labs, information theory pioneer Claude Shannon (who later became an MIT professor himself), made his own versions of the machine. He kept one on his desk, where science fiction author Arthur C. Clarke saw it. Clarke later wrote, "There is something unspeakably sinister about a machine that does nothing—absolutely nothing—except switch itself off", and he was fascinated by the concept.

Minsky also invented a "gravity machine" that would ring a bell if the gravitational constant were to change, a theoretical possibility that is not expected to occur in the foreseeable future.

== Commercial products ==
In the 1960s, a novelty toy maker called "Captain Co." sold a "Monster Inside the Black Box", featuring a mechanical hand that emerged from a featureless plastic black box and flipped a toggle switch, turning itself off. This version may have been inspired in part by "Thing", the disembodied hand featured in the television sitcom The Addams Family. Other versions have been produced. In their conceptually purest form, these machines do nothing except switch themselves off.

It is claimed that Don Poynter, who graduated from the University of Cincinnati in 1949 and founded Poynter Products, Inc., first produced and sold the "Little Black Box", which simply switched itself off. He then added a coin-snatching feature, dubbed his invention "The Thing", arranged licensing with the producers of the television show, The Addams Family, and later sold "Uncle Fester's Mystery Light Bulb" as another show spinoff product. Robert J. Whiteman, owner and president of Liberty Library Corporation, also claims credit for developing "The Thing". (Both companies were later to be co-defendants in landmark litigation initiated by Theodor Geisel ("Dr. Seuss") over copyright issues related to figurines.)

Do-it-yourself versions of the useless machine (often modernized with microprocessor controls) have been featured in a number of web videos and inspired more complex machines that are able to move or which use more than one switch. As of 2015, there are several completed or kit form devices being offered for sale.

== Cultural references ==
In 2009, the artist David Moises exhibited his reconstruction of The Ultimate Machine aka Shannon's Hand, and explained the interactions of Claude Shannon, Marvin Minsky, and Arthur C. Clarke regarding the device.

Episode 3 of the third season of the FX show Fargo, "The Law of Non-Contradiction", features a useless machine (and, in a story within the story, an android named MNSKY after Marvin Minsky).

== See also ==
- Arthur Ganson
- Discard Protocol
- Jean Tinguely
- Overengineering
- Rube Goldberg machine
- Theo Jansen
- Trammel of Archimedes
