= The Principle of Restricted Choice =

- Fargo episode
- Episode no.: Season 3 Episode 2
- Directed by: Michael Uppendahl
- Written by: Noah Hawley
- Cinematography by: Craig Wrobleski
- Editing by: Henk Vaneeghen
- Production code: XFO03002
- Original air date: April 26, 2017
- Running time: 52 minutes

Guest appearances
- Michael Stuhlbarg as Sy Feltz; Shea Whigham as Chief Moe Dammik; Scott Hylands as Ennis Stussy; Mark Forward as Donny Mashman

Episode chronology
← Previous "The Law of Vacant Places"	Next → "The Law of Non-Contradiction"
- Fargo (season 3)

"The Principle of Restricted Choice" is the second episode of the third season of the American anthology black comedy–crime drama television series Fargo. It is the 22nd overall episode of the series and was written by series creator Noah Hawley and directed by Michael Uppendahl. It originally aired on FX on April 26, 2017.

The season is set primarily in 2010, in three Minnesota towns: St. Cloud, Eden Valley, and Eden Prairie. It follows the lives of a couple, Ray Stussy and Nikki Swango, who, after unsuccessfully trying to rob Ray's wealthy older brother Emmit, become involved in a double murder case. One of the victims is an old man with a mysterious past whose stepdaughter, Gloria Burgle, is a policewoman. Meanwhile, Emmit tries to cut his ties with a shady organization he borrowed money from a year before, but the company, represented by V. M. Varga, has other plans. In the episode, Ray and Nikki work on their next move by attempting to retrieve the stamp, while Emmit and Sy try to find more about Varga. Meanwhile, Gloria finds more information on her stepfather while investigating Maurice's crimes.

According to Nielsen Media Research, the episode was seen by an estimated 1.06 million household viewers and gained a 0.3 ratings share among adults aged 18–49. The episode received critical acclaim, with critics praising the writing, character development, humor, and performances (particularly Mary Elizabeth Winstead and Michael Stuhlbarg).

== Plot ==
While checking the books that she found in her stepfather's house, Gloria (Carrie Coon) deduces that Ennis was a sci-fi writer known as "Thaddeus Mobley", by checking some of his older photos.

Emmit (Ewan McGregor) and Sy (Michael Stuhlbarg) talk with their lawyer Irv Blumkin (Hardee T. Lineham), to know anything about Varga (David Thewlis). Irv insults them for making business without properly knowing Varga, so they ask him to investigate Varga on their behalf. However, when Irv searches for Varga's name in Google, the computer tricks him into clicking a "download information" link. The link takes a picture of Irv and his secretary, before shutting itself off. Later, Varga places a truck in one of Emmit's parking lots. While Emmit wants to take action, Sy convinces him to stay quiet about it, fearing that Varga may take action against them.

While Gloria settles in her new joint police station, she investigates a robbery that Maurice LeFay committed at a gas station. Seeing the torn page of the phone book, she deduces that Maurice stopped before killing Ennis, as he didn't know the address. Ray (McGregor) checks his office's database to confirm that Maurice's death was ruled an accident, informing Nikki (Mary Elizabeth Winstead). That night, Ray talks with Emmit outside his house while Nikki sneaks in to steal the stamp. However, Emmit already replaced it with a portrait of a donkey, so Nikki writes "Who's the ass now?" in the portrait and then leaves her used tampon in the desk before exiting. She meets with Ray, who seems to want to mend the past with Emmit after their talk. Nikki states that Emmit replaced the stamp, suggesting he won't trust Ray and that the donkey was used to represent Ray.

Varga's enforcer, Yuri (Goran Bogdan) intercepts Irv at a parking garage and kills him by throwing him off the roof. Emmit shows Sy what happened at his office, with Emmit revealing that he replaced the stamp as the frame was broken. Sy tells him he will handle the situation, before they are notified of Irv's death. Later, Sy visits Ray at a restaurant, telling him to stop talking to Emmit. He then gives him a $20 bill, telling him that is the last money he will ever get from his brother. Sy exits and rams Ray's Corvette twice, although he accidentally hits a civilian's car as he exits. Varga visits Emmit at his office, stating that he is moving into an unused wing of his offices and has his men bring in boxes, surprising Emmit and Sy.

== Production ==
=== Development ===
In April 2017, it was reported that the second episode of the season would be titled "The Principle of Restricted Choice", and was to be directed by Michael Uppendahl and written by series creator Noah Hawley. This was Hawley's 18th writing credit, and Uppendahl's fourth directing credit.

== Reception ==
=== Viewers ===
In its original American broadcast, "The Principle of Restricted Choice" was seen by an estimated 1.06 million household viewers and gained a 0.3 ratings share among adults aged 18–49, according to Nielsen Media Research. This means that 0.3 percent of all households with televisions watched the episode. This was a 26% decrease in viewership from the previous episode, which was watched by 1.42 million viewers with a 0.4 in the 18-49 demographics.

=== Critical reviews ===
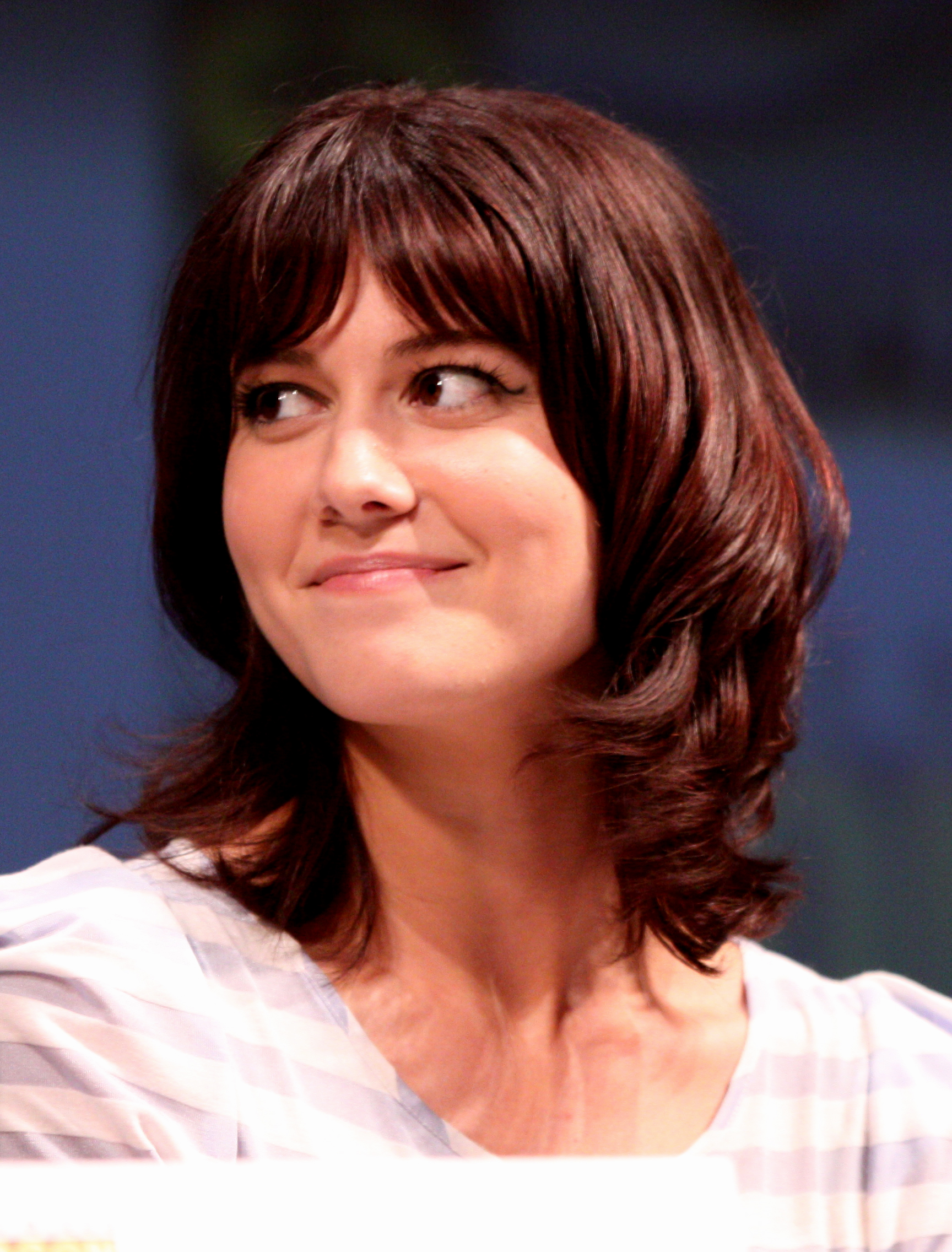
Mary Elizabeth Winstead's performance in the episode was praised by critics.

"The Principle of Restricted Choice" received critical acclaim. The review aggregator website Rotten Tomatoes reported a 100% approval rating with an average rating of 8.5/10 for the episode, based on 15 reviews. The site's consensus states: "'The Principles of Restricted Choice' quickly builds on the framework of Fargo's season 3 premiere, shaking up the central characters while advancing a major conflict."

Matt Fowler of IGN gave the episode a "great" 8.4 out of 10 and wrote in his verdict, "Fargo's Season 3 delivers a second episode that helps shine the spotlight on a few more crucial characters while also presenting us with a world that feels even more behind the times than usual in terms of antiquated methods of information gathering and communication. The crime through-line feels a touch flimsy at this point, but the characters are all still really fun and engaging and they keep the heart of the season pumping."

Zack Handlen of The A.V. Club gave the episode an "A-" grade and wrote, "'Principle' gives time to all the major players of the season so far, but its primary interest is in pushing the feud between Emmit and Ray to the next level."

Alan Sepinwall of Uproxx wrote, "The arc of season three began with equal parts envy and mistaken identity, as Ray's desire to have a life more like his brother's leads to the murder of Ennis Stussy. 'The Principle of Restricted Choice' offers Ray an unexpected opportunity to quash this feud before even more people die — through his actions, anyway; Emmit and Sy get their lawyer Irv killed by asking him to investigate Varga — when he and Emmit realize they’d both be happier making peace and acting like brothers again." Ben Travers of IndieWire gave the episode a "B+" grade and wrote, "The driving conflict of Fargo often boils down to forceful determination and unflinching manners... It's enough to drive the more pushy among us mad, as we sit back and watch good people get taken advantage of, again and again."

Kevin P. Sullivan of Entertainment Weekly wrote, "In what has become typical Fargo fashion, last week's premiere opened with a curveball and then set the machinations of its larger crime story into motion." Brian Tallerico of Vulture gave the episode a perfect 5 star rating out of 5 and wrote, "The title refers to a theory in Bridge that playing a particular card decreases the probability of a player having any equivalent card. It fits perfectly for this episode as characters like Nikki, Sy, and Vargas are playing cards on their opponents." Nick Harley of Den of Geek wrote, "All it took was one episode, but my knee-jerk reaction to the premiere now feels a little foolish. Not only does Fargo successfully start to flirt with its modern setting in its second hour, it also takes those familiar elements from past seasons and executes them so skillfully that they feel more like a revamped cover of a favorite song more than a tired retread. That's not to say that the show cannot slip back into being formulaic and merely passable, but it certainly feels like this could be going somewhere good."

Scott Tobias of The New York Times wrote, "Ewan McGregor's dual role has been getting most of the attention so far, but Mary-Elizabeth Winstead's work as Nikki has been the bigger standout." Caralynn Lippo of TV Fanatic gave the episode a 4.5 star rating out of 5 and wrote, "Unfathomable pinheadery is a great way to sum up this season so far. And I say that in the best, most loving way." Kyle Fowle of Paste gave the episode a 8.2 rating out of 10 and wrote, "Most excitingly, this episode sets up the war brewing between Emmit and Sy vs. Ray and Nikki. Things are moving faster and faster in this slow Midwestern town. There is bound to be much more pinheadery in future episodes."

=== Accolades ===
TVLine named Michael Stuhlbarg as an honorable mention as the "Performer of the Week" for the week of April 29, 2017, for his performance in the episode. The site wrote, "Every business tycoon could use a levelheaded number-cruncher like Fargo's Sy Feltz, played by Boardwalk Empire standout Michael Stuhlbarg. With a closely trimmed crewcut and mustache, Sy is the epitome of quiet Midwestern efficiency, but this week, Stuhlbarg let us see how nasty Sy can get when things don't go according to plan. He was hilariously frazzled as V.M. Varga barged into Emmit's office, and delivered the episode's biggest laugh when Sy speculated on what Varga might be concealing in the back of his big rig: 'Slave girls?' Plus, he allowed Sy's pent-up rage to boil over when the money man gleefully smashed into Ray's Corvette (twice) with his white Hummer. Other cast members might have flashier roles, but two episodes in, Stuhlbarg might just be Season 3's stealth MVP."
