= The Law of Non-Contradiction =

- Fargo episode
- The story within a story The Planet Wyh, which presents the story of the android Minsky (pictured), was praised by critics and compared to the works of Don Hertzfeldt. This was the first occurrence of the series using animation.
- Episode no.: Season 3 Episode 3
- Directed by: John Cameron
- Written by: Matt Wolpert; Ben Nedivi
- Production code: XFO03003
- Original air date: May 3, 2017
- Running time: 47 minutes

Guest appearances
- Thomas Randall Mann as Thaddeus Mobley; Fred Melamed as Howard Zimmerman; Francesca Eastwood as Vivian Lord; Rob McElhenney as LAPD Sgt. Oscar Hunt; Frances Fisher as Older Vivian Lord; Ray Wise as Paul Marrane; Scott Hylands as Ennis Stussy; Mark Forward as Donny Mashman; Roger Burton as Older Howard Zimmerman; Nikolai Nikolaeff as Drug Dealer

Episode chronology
← Previous "The Principle of Restricted Choice"	Next → "The Narrow Escape Problem"
- Fargo season 3

"The Law of Non-Contradiction" is the third episode of the third season of the FX anthology series Fargo, and the twenty-third episode of the series overall. It was directed by series executive producer John Cameron, and written by Matt Wolpert and Ben Nedivi. The title refers to one of the three classic laws of thought in classical logic known as the principle or law of noncontradiction.

The episode follows policewoman Gloria Burgle (Carrie Coon) as she comes to Los Angeles to further investigate the mysterious past of her stepfather by researching information about his previous life as science fiction writer Thaddeus Mobley (Thomas Randall Mann). Meanwhile, the viewers also witness Mobley's story back in 1975 while following via animation the story of The Planet Wyh, one of his novels. It is the very first Fargo episode to feature only one main character (although Coon's fellow main cast members Ewan McGregor and David Thewlis also voice characters in The Planet Wyh), and is also the first to take place almost entirely outside of Minnesota, North Dakota, South Dakota, Nevada or Missouri.

"The Law of Non-Contradiction" was first aired on May 3, 2017, and was seen by 1.17 million viewers. It was acclaimed by critics, with some calling it one of the best episodes in the series. Coon's performance, the writing, and the episode's originality and uniqueness within the series were all highly praised, while its various themes and self-aware lack of point were the subject of several analyses.

== Plot ==
In 1975 Los Angeles, young and trustful science fiction writer Thaddeus Mobley receives an award for his novel The Planet Wyh and meets producer Howard Zimmerman, who suggests adapting the book into a film. During a screen test, Zimmerman introduces him to actress and femme fatale Vivian Lord. After Zimmerman claims that he is having trouble attracting Warren Beatty to the project, Mobley agrees to provide him with the necessary finances using his book advances. He begins dating Lord, who seduces him into becoming dependent on cocaine. These factors leave Mobley heavily in debt, and he discovers too late that he is a victim of Zimmerman and Lord's elaborate scam, as they never intended to make the movie. Enraged, he near-fatally beats Zimmerman. Before fleeing L.A. in fear of the consequences, Mobley sees the name of the manufacturer of his motel room's toilet, Dennis Stussy and Sons, (with the faded "D" implying that it is how he chose his future name of Ennis Stussy, Gloria Burgle's stepfather).

In the present (2010), Gloria arrives in L.A. to investigate her stepfather's past. Upon her arrival, she is overwhelmed by the behavior of the locals, has her baggage stolen, and, in her room – the same one where her stepfather lived in 1975 – finds a strange box that keeps turning itself off. She tracks down Zimmerman, left crippled by Mobley's assault, and Lord, the latter telling her of the past events mentioned above in a way that is both accurate and remorseful. Having gathered this information, Gloria finally realizes that none of this ever had anything to do with the murder case, and that her journey was pointless. Before finally going back to Eden Valley, Minnesota, bringing the box with her, she also notices the toilet manufacturer's name. Upon her return, she is informed that fingerprints found at the murder scene belong to a parolee named Maurice LeFay, but that he died in a freak accident shortly after the murder.

During the episode, Gloria reads The Planet Wyh. The novel, depicted to the audience via animation with Gloria as narrator, tells the story of Minsky, a small robot programmed to observe and record, and who only says the phrase "I can help!". After his spaceship crashed on Earth millions of years ago and his scientist companion died, Minsky witnesses the creation of matter, the birth of life, the rise and fall of civilizations, and much more. After two million years, the first contact with extraterrestrial life takes place, and Minsky is recovered by the Federation of United Planets. After being recognized as the oldest sentient being in the universe and thanked for the massive amounts of information he recorded, Minsky is told that it is time to shut himself down; he complies.

== Production ==
=== Casting ===
Vivian Lord is played by Francesca Eastwood (daughter of Clint Eastwood and Frances Fisher) as a young woman, and by Frances Fisher (wrongly spelled as "Francis Fisher" in the end credits) as an older woman. The stranger in the plane, called Paul Marrane, is played by Ray Wise.

=== Animation ===
Hawley asked Don Hertzfeldt to write and animate the Planet Wyh sequences, which at this time were intended to run a total of 23 minutes and be spread throughout the entire season, but Hertzfeldt reluctantly declined, saying he would be unable to complete this amount of work in time. The show's animation was ultimately much shorter, appearing only in "The Law of Non-Contradiction", and was reworked instead as an homage to Hertzfeldt.

=== Music ===
The music for the episode was provided by series composer Jeff Russo. Several pre-existing songs were featured in the episode: "Liar" by Three Dog Night, "Blue Shadows on the Trail" by Riders of the Sky, "Silver Bells" by Gene Autry, "Orisa" by Moncho y su Wawanko Gitano, and "Jingo" by Santana. Unlike the previous episodes of the season, the end credits, instead of a song, feature the theme of the original film by Carter Burwell, re-arranged by Russo.

== Reception ==
=== Ratings ===
The episode first aired in the US on FX on May 3, 2017, and was seen by 1.17 million viewers.

=== Critical reception ===
"Where to begin with 'The Law of Non-Contradiction,' Fargo's offbeat, dream-like divergence from its main storyline? [...] With those wonderful animated interludes that, similarly to Legion, work to test the how far the increasingly formulaic boundaries of Prestige TV can stretch without breaking? With the idea that this entire episode, every strange, time-hopping twist and turn ultimately amounts to 'oh, none of this actually matters' and that, somehow, is a satisfying ending?"

— Vinnie Mancuso of the New York Observer.

"The Law of Non-Contradiction" received critical acclaim, particularly for its uniqueness, originality, writing, themes, and Coon's performance. The guest performances, particularly Rob McElhenney's and Ray Wise's, were also praised. It currently holds a 92% rating on Rotten Tomatoes: the critical consensus is "'The Law of Non-Contradiction' impressively navigates a single storyline and a drastic change in location and tone, with compellingly unconventional results."

Vinnie Mancuso of the New York Observer was very enthusiastic about the episode: she applauded Coon's performance and her character's journey, as well as the "grandiose" speeches of Gloria. She also praised the choice to make an episode with little to no relation to the season's main plot, stating "What makes this episode brilliant isn't what sets these three stories apart but what connects them. And they are connected, from 2010 to the cocaine-fueled 70s to a color-and-ink animated robot world [...] Fargo is playing with the idea that there is no such thing as an unimportant story, only the moments between collisions when we're not truly living." Scott Tobias of The New York Times gave a very positive review, highly praising its writing and originality, and comparing the episode's themes to those of the original film and Barton Fink, another film of the Coens. He also praised Wise's guest appearance.

Ben Travers of IndieWire gave the episode an A− rating, stating "Just when you thought Fargo was playing it safe in Season 3, in comes a big swing. Episode 3 had a lot of originality to it, breaking the pattern set by Seasons 1 and 2 while elevating one character to telling heights. In other words, arguments that Hawley was ready to recede into formula were put to rest, and those of us already enthralled with Year Three were again reminded of Gloria's distinct relationship to her policeman predecessors. Just as importantly, it threw an early curveball for everyone, knocking us off our game and reminding us how creative this anthology can be." He also praised how the episode showed both the good and bad sides of technology. Noel Murray of Rolling Stone called the episode "a wondrous, moody hour of television, bordering on despairing, with only a little of the comedic quirkiness that is this drama's stock-in-trade. It's the rare prestige TV episode that might've been even better if it had run even longer". He highly praised the story of Unit MNSKY.

Zack Handlen of The A.V. Club considered "The Law of Non-Contradiction" one of the best episodes in the entire show, including previous seasons, as well as his possible personal favourite. He gave it an A rating, stating "It lacks the emotional power of events from previous seasons, but in its place achieves a sustained, knife's edge sort of curiosity, a high-wire act that keeps threatening to tip over into utter meaninglessness without quite doing so". "What holds all this together, for me, is Gloria finding out where Ennis got his name. It's like a shaggy dog story [...] Ennis's past isn't why he got killed, but there is a chain of events that brought him to that house in the midwest, a series of decisions that both put him into Gloria's life and also made him the inadvertent target of someone looking for someone else. [...] It wanders, and eventually finds its way back home, but it's maybe the closest the series has yet come to actually capturing more than just quirk and crime: that all tragedies are just farce if you step back far enough, but that doesn't make them any less tragic. Or less funny." Noting the many references to the works of the Coen brothers as usual, he however expressed concern that Fargo "runs the risk of becoming a series of paper dolls being slotted into new outfits without much variation at the source".

Matt Fowler of IGN gave the episode a near-perfect 9.5 rating out of 10, stating "Carrie Coon plus a severe change of location plus animated interludes about a wandering robot plus flashbacks to a Hollywood con gone wrong made for one of the most unconventional and rewarding Fargo episodes to date. Fargo changed its climate this week for an awesome Gloria-centric story focused on the mystery of her dead stepfather". Brian Tallerico of Vulture gave the episode a four out of five rating.

Conversely, Kevin P. Sullivan of Entertainment Weekly gave the episode a C rating, stating "there was the unshakable sense that something was off—like we're in an invasion movie and are starting to suspect that our friend has been body-snatched. It looks like Fargo, and it sounds like Fargo. But is that really Fargo in there? [...] All of the pieces are here for a season of Fargo, but there's no heart. The show still looks like our friend, but there's no life in its eyes."

Incidentally, Coon had also received praise around the time of the episode's airing for her performance in the third season of The Leftovers, which led to comparisons being made between her performances and characters, and praise being given to her acting range.

=== Analysis ===
==== Comparisons to the work of the Coens ====
Many reviewers saw in Gloria's pose in the episode (pictured right) a reference to the iconic picture from Barton Fink (left).

As most episodes of Fargo, "The Law of Non-Contradiction" drew comparisons with the works of the Coen brothers, most notably in this occurrence with a subplot in the original film revolving around Mike Yanagita, which Fargo creator Noah Hawley had acknowledged in the past as one of the show's main influences; in the film, Marge Gunderson, while in Minneapolis, meets up with Mike, a former classmate from her hometown that she hasn't seen in a long time. There, he tells her that he married an old mutual friend of theirs who has since died, tearfully confesses his loneliness since her death, and unsuccessfully tries to seduce her. Marge is sympathetic towards Mike, but ultimately learns that everything he told her was a lie. With a new look at the human capacity to deceive, she immediately returns to question Jerry Lundegaard a second time, realizing that he may have lied to her. To Scott Tobias of The New York Times, the episode is "basically an hourlong Mike Yanagita scene", as Gloria is "learning about secrets and lies and then coming back to her own town with unlocked doors, bringing with her a keener sense of the possibilities." Other reviewers also drew comparisons with the Yanagita subplot.

Many reviewers noticed that, in addition to several of the episode's elements and themes being reminiscent of Barton Fink, Gloria's pose while she thinks on a beach is a reference to the picture Barton Fink is obsessed with in the film. It was also noticed that the previous scene, a conversation between Gloria and Vivian Lord, takes place in a diner featured in The Big Lebowski.

Parallels were also drawn between the episode and the films The Hudsucker Proxy and The Man Who Wasn't There.

==== The Planet Wyh and the box ====
Vinnie Mancuso of the New York Observer saw the animated adventures of Minsky as a metaphor of Gloria's journey in Los Angeles, stating "[a] single thought reverberates through Gloria's mind the same way it echoes constantly from [Minsky]: 'I can help!' She doesn't so much follow leads as she does drift from place to place, from unhelpful person to unhelpful person, stone-faced and persistent the entire way, until she arrives in the hospital room of an elderly Howard Zimmerman, horribly crippled from Thaddeus Mobley's attack decades earlier. The poster on the wall behind his bed for Pleonexia Pictures isn't exactly subtle ('pleonexia' is a term for extreme greed) and neither are the answers he gives Gloria. But the words do help, if only to sum up Gloria's entire existence in a brief science lesson [...] And what else is Gloria doing here besides floating and colliding, existing then not existing? Despair becomes hope, becomes despair, becomes hope. The question, really, is whether or not these brief moments of collision and substance are worth it, fleeting may they be. Unfortunately for Gloria, in this particular case it is not."

Ben Travers of IndieWire discussed the episode's approach to technology through Gloria's. He felt that while the episode made the viewer relate to Gloria's views on technology, showing Sgt. Hunt's obsession with Facebook as shallow, or with Minsky being deemed obsolete at the end of his journey just like Gloria's new chief makes her feel like; however, it also "supported the advancement of society, to an admittedly lesser degree", with the absence of cell phones for Gloria and her son Nathan forcing her partner Donny to stop the school bus so she could talk to her son, or the fact that the WGA's records not being electronic forcing Gloria to wait a long time for the results. Questioning the symbolism of the mysterious useless box Gloria finds, he felt that it "felt targeted: Who would build such a useless machine? Every time you turn it on, it turns itself off. Does it represent Gloria's feelings toward technology? That it's more trouble than it's worth? Is it a message left for her by someone—Ray Wise's omnipresent frequent flier, Paul Marrane? Is it a reverse macguffin, a literal object meant to mean more to the show's themes than the plot itself?"

Murray of Rolling Stone also discussed the meaning of the useless box, feeling that, just like the box turns itself off, the director and writers "barely have a chance to introduce all their characters before Gloria is on a flight home. Almost as soon as this Fargo installment gets switched on, it turns itself off". Alan Sepinwall of Uproxx noted that the switch of the useless box is very similar to the switch of Minsky when he, as well, turns himself off. Further, the robot Minsky was named in homage to Marvin Minsky, noted inventor of the useless box, which he termed the "ultimate machine".

==== The law of noncontradiction ====
The title of the episode refers to the principle or law of noncontradiction, also known as the principle or law of contradiction: it is the second of three laws of thought in classical logic known as the three classic laws of thought. It states that contradictory statements cannot both be true in the same sense at the same time, and that therefore something cannot be both true and false, or be and not be.

Alan Sepinwall of Uproxx commented that several elements in the episode contradict the law of noncontradiction: "Gloria is a police chief who isn't really a police chief anymore, running a department that no longer quite exists, still technically married to a man who is no longer her husband, investigating the death of a man who hadn't been her stepfather in decades but still had a paternal (or grandpaternal) presence in her life, was Ennis Stussy but not really Ennis Stussy, and who once wrote the tale of a helper robot that never seemed to get a chance to help anyone, then proved enormously helpful to the entire universe. Even the novelty box that Gloria finds in the back of her motel closet is built to be a contradiction, existing only to turn itself off".

In a scene in a bar, Paul Marrane tells Gloria the tale of a soldier who goes off to war, first giving his wife a bill of divorce that becomes official if he does not return within 12 months, but then retroactively takes effect from the moment he left; should he not return, this would mean that she would have been divorced during the last 12 months, despite the fact she had spent those months married to that very same man. This is a paradox and a contradiction to the law of noncontradiction.

==== Other ====
Regarding Zimmerman's speech to Gloria about quantum and the meaning of life, Zack Handlen of The A.V. Club commented "Whether or not he's right is up to the viewer, but while I'm not sure 'quantum' really enters into it, the episode does make an interesting case for how the accumulation of events can offer substance even if those events never yield any deeper meaning. Or else it's a reminder that, if the collisions are what matter, we should make sure to check our aim first."

Rob McElhenney's character was seen by some critics as a reference to the TV series It's Always Sunny in Philadelphia, and to Mac, the character he plays in it.

== See also ==
- The law of identity, the first classic law of thought
- The law of excluded middle, the third and last classic law of thought
- A shaggy dog story, an extremely long-winded story characterized by extensive narration of typically irrelevant elements concluding in an anticlimax and proving to be pointless
- The principle of sufficient reason, a concept indirectly discussed in the episode
