= Fargo season 3 =

2017 season of American crime anthology TV series

Fargo
- Season 3
- Promotional poster
- Starring: Ewan McGregor; Carrie Coon; Mary Elizabeth Winstead; Goran Bogdan; David Thewlis
- No. of episodes: 10

Release
- Original network: FX
- Original release: April 19 – June 21, 2017

Season chronology
- ← Previous; Season 2 Next → Season 4

The third season of the American black comedy crime drama television series Fargo, billed as Fargo: Year Three and Fargo: Installment 3, aired on FX from April 19 to June 21, 2017, totaling ten episodes. The series is an anthology about violent crime in the American Midwest, with each season acting as a self-contained story within the show's shared continuity. This season takes place in Minnesota between late 2010 and early 2011, and depicts a sibling rivalry between parole officer Ray Stussy and real estate mogul Emmit that spirals into a series of murders around the area. The situation is further exacerbated by Emmit's involvement with V. M. Varga, a shady businessman who uses his vast resources to exploit the ensuing chaos.

The season was produced by FX Productions and MGM Television, with Noah Hawley serving as showrunner. The writers used the more contemporary setting to explore the Digital Age, the effects of late-stage capitalism, and the spread of disinformation in an era of post-truth. Like the previous seasons, Year Three was filmed in Calgary, Alberta in early 2017. Ewan McGregor leads the season's main cast in the dual role of Ray and Emmit Stussy, and stars alongside Carrie Coon, Mary Elizabeth Winstead, Goran Bogdan, and David Thewlis. Michael Stuhlbarg, Hamish Linklater, Olivia Sandoval, Shea Whigham, Mark Forward, Mary McDonnell, Graham Verchere, Scott Hylands, Linda Kash, Caitlynne Medrek, and Scoot McNairy all make recurring appearances.

Fargo: Year Three was praised by critics, primarily for its social commentary, directing, and performances, particularly from McGregor and Thewlis. It received various accolades, including the Primetime Emmy Award for Outstanding Music Composition for a Limited Series, Movie or Special for composer Jeff Russo, and the Critics' Choice Television Award for Best Actor in a Limited Series or Movie and Golden Globe Award for Best Actor – Miniseries or Television Film, both for McGregor.

== Cast ==
=== Main ===
- Ewan McGregor as brothers Emmit and Raymond "Ray" Stussy. Emmit is a wealthy, happily married man and the self-proclaimed "Parking Lot King of Minnesota". Younger brother Ray is a financially struggling parole officer who feels betrayed by Emmit over the way their father's inheritance was divided between them, when Ray got his father's Corvette and Emmit got a valuable stamp collection.
  - McGregor also voiced the Captain, the android Minsky's scientist companion, in the episode "The Law of Non-Contradiction".
- Carrie Coon as Gloria Burgle, a dedicated police officer and police chief of Eden Valley until the department is absorbed by the county. She is trying to solve the murder of her stepfather, Ennis Stussy.
- Mary Elizabeth Winstead as Nikki Swango, a crafty and alluring young woman with a passion for competitive bridge. She is a recent parolee and Ray's fiancée.
- Goran Bogdan as Yuri Gurka, a Ukrainian man working for V. M. Varga.
- David Thewlis as V. M. Varga, an unscrupulous British businessman with whom Emmit unwillingly finds himself in a partnership.
  - Thewlis also voiced a member of the Federation of United Planets in the episode "The Law of Non-Contradiction".

=== Recurring ===
- Michael Stuhlbarg as Sy Feltz, Emmit's loyal and dedicated business partner/attorney.
- Shea Whigham as Sheriff Moe Dammik, the no-nonsense Meeker County Sheriff who becomes Gloria's boss when the Eden Valley police are absorbed by the county.
- Scoot McNairy as Maurice LeFay, a drug addict and another parolee of Ray's.
- Andy Yu as Meemo, one of Varga's henchmen.
- Mark Forward as Donny Mashman, Gloria's partner.
- Graham Verchere as Nathan Burgle, Gloria's son.
- Olivia Sandoval as Winnie Lopez, a St. Cloud police officer who befriends Gloria.
- Russell Harvard as Mr. Wrench, a deaf assassin who helps Nikki. Harvard reprises the role from the first season.
- Mary McDonnell as Ruby Goldfarb, a wealthy widow who attempts to buy out Stussy Lots.
- Hamish Linklater as Larue Dollard, an IRS agent investigating Stussy Lots.
- Scott Hylands as Ennis Stussy, Gloria's ex-stepfather, who LeFay confuses with Emmit, despite being unrelated.
- Linda Kash as Stella Stussy, Emmit's wife.
- Caitlynne Medrek as Grace Stussy, Emmit's daughter.

=== Guest stars ===
- Sylvester Groth as Colonel Horst Lagerfeld, a Stasi colonel that interrogates Jakob Ungerleider.
- Fabian Busch as Jakob Ungerleider, an East German man accused of murder.
- Thomas Mann as Thaddeus Mobley, a science fiction writer from the 1970s who becomes Ennis Stussy.
- Fred Melamed as Howard Zimmerman, a producer that takes an interest in Mobley.
  - Roger Burton as the elderly, present-day Howard Zimmerman
- Rob McElhenney as Officer Oscar Hunt, a Los Angeles police officer.
- Francesca Eastwood as Vivian Lord, an actress that works with Zimmerman.
  - Frances Fisher as the older, present-day Vivian Lord
- Nikolai Nikolaeff as Drug Dealer
- Ray Wise as Paul Marrane, an enigmatic man who crosses paths with Gloria, Nikki, and Yuri. He is implied to be the Wandering Jew.
- DJ Qualls as The Golem, a man who works for Varga.

Billy Bob Thornton, who starred as Lorne Malvo in the first season, narrates Peter and the Wolf in the fourth episode, "The Narrow Escape Problem".

== Episodes ==
No. overall	No. in season	Title	Directed by	Written by	Original release date	Prod. code	U.S. viewers (millions)
21	1	"The Law of Vacant Places"	Noah Hawley	Noah Hawley	April 19, 2017	XFO03001	1.42
In East Berlin, 1988, a man is falsely accused of the murder of Helga Albrecht, committed by "Yuri Gurka", because the men lived at the same address at different times. In December 2010, St. Cloud, Minnesota, parking lot realtor Emmit Stussy denies his estranged parole officer brother Ray's request for a loan so he can buy a ring for his parolee and girlfriend Nikki Swango. Ray blackmails parolee Maurice LeFay into stealing the last remaining stamp from their deceased father's valuable collection. LeFay goes to the wrong house and kills its occupant, the elderly Ennis Stussy. Ennis's stepdaughter and Eden Valley chief of police Gloria Burgle finds his body, as well as a box hidden under his floorboards. Emmit and his confidant Sy Feltz are visited by V.M. Varga, a representative of a company they took a loan from, who announces his plan to partner with them. LeFay meets Ray at Nikki's apartment and tries to blackmail him for money. As he leaves, Nikki has Ray help her drop an air conditioner on LeFay's head, killing him.
22	2	"The Principle of Restricted Choice"	Michael Uppendahl	Noah Hawley	April 26, 2017	XFO03002	1.06
Searching the box, Gloria learns that Ennis wrote science fiction under the name "Thaddeus Mobley". She visits a gas station LeFay got Ennis's address from, deducing that he was looking for him specifically due to him tearing Ennis's page of the phone book out. Ray visits Emmit to try and resolve their feud, but it is a ploy for Nikki to break into his house while he is distracted and take the stamp. She is unable to find it and vandalizes his office. Sy warns Ray never to contact Emmit again, intentionally hitting his car while he leaves but accidentally hitting another vehicle. Emmit asks his lawyer to look into Varga as he begins setting up on Emmit's properties, but when he searches the internet for Varga's name, his henchmen Yuri and Meemo kill him, staging it as a suicide.
23	3	"The Law of Non-Contradiction"	John Cameron	Matt Wolpert & Ben Nedivi	May 3, 2017	XFO03003	1.17
In Los Angeles, 1975, Mobley is approached by film producer Howard Zimmerman, who wants to adapt his novel The Planet Wyh. After Mobley discovers that Zimmerman and actress Vivian Lord are tricking him, he nearly kills him and takes the name "Ennis Stussy" before fleeing the state. In the present, Gloria goes to L.A. to collect information on Mobley. She approaches both the crippled Zimmerman and Vivian for information, but they deny knowing him. She encounters Paul Marrane, a strange but friendly man she met on the plane ride over, who tells her a parable that invokes the idea of Schrödinger's cat. Vivian contacts Gloria and admits the truth about what happened. Back in Minnesota, she learns that LeFay's fingerprints were found in Ennis's house and that the former died in an "accident" the same night. Throughout the episode, animated segments depict the plot of The Planet Wyh: A robot named Minsky wanders a planet for millions of years after his masters die in a crash, eventually being found by an alien race that thanks him for the information he collected over millennia before switching him off.
24	4	"The Narrow Escape Problem"	Michael Uppendahl	Monica Beletsky	May 10, 2017	XFO03004	1.05
Ray disguises himself as Emmit and gains access to his safe deposit box but does not find the stamp, and withdraws money from Emmit's account. Varga comes to Emmit's house for dinner, charms his family, and frightens him into making him a partner in Stussy Lots. Gloria finds Ray's card in LeFay's wallet and visits him at his office, bumping into St. Cloud officer Winnie Lopez, who is investigating the car Sy accidentally hit. Ray blames LeFay's behavior on his history of drug abuse, being fired shortly after due to Sy tipping his boss off to his illegal relationship. Yuri and Meemo witness Lopez asking Sy about the accident. Having noticed the name of Sy's company, she does research on Emmit and informs Gloria that he and Ray are brothers, and that Emmit lives in a town with a name similar to Ennis's.
25	5	"The House of Special Purpose"	Dearbhla Walsh	Bob DeLaurentis	May 17, 2017	XFO03005	0.98
Ray again disguises himself as Emmit and makes a sex tape with Nikki. They send it to him, but his wife finds it first and leaves him. Sy is forced to drink Varga's urine out of a mug as punishment for talking to the police. Now terrified, he tries to set up a sale of Stussy Lots to businesswoman Ruby Goldfarb, but is interrupted by Emmit asking him to take care of Ray. Varga plants the idea in Emmit's head that Sy and Ray may be working together. Nikki accepts Ray's marriage proposal and is called by Sy, who agrees to give them money if they leave Emmit alone. Gloria and Lopez detain Ray for questioning, but incoming chief Moe Dammick, chalking up their evidence to coincidence, releases him and orders Gloria to drop the investigation. Nikki and Sy's meeting is interrupted by Yuri and Meemo, who brutalize Nikki when she mouths off to them.
26	6	"The Lord of No Mercy"	Dearbhla Walsh	Noah Hawley	May 24, 2017	XFO03006	1.04
IRS agent Larue Dollard tries to audit Stussy Lots due to the withdrawal Ray made, but Meemo gets rid of him. Gloria tries to interview Emmit but Varga intervenes, and she is put off by his strange demeanor. When Gloria visits Ray's apartment, he and Nikki flee to a hotel, forgetting their stolen money. Unaware that Varga has ordered them killed, Ray returns to his apartment to find Emmit waiting, wanting to end their feud by giving him the stamp. They argue and the stamp's glass frame is shoved into Ray's face, breaking and puncturing his throat. Horrified, Emmit calls Varga for help, unknowingly saving Nikki's life when Varga calls Meemo before he can kill her. They stage the scene to make it seem as though Nikki killed Ray because he was abusing her. Gloria instinctively decides to visit Ray again.
27	7	"The Law of Inevitability"	Mike Barker	Noah Hawley & Matt Wolpert & Ben Nedivi	May 31, 2017	XFO03007	1.03
Nikki is arrested after Gloria and Lopez find Ray's body. Yuri steals Ennis's case file, while Emmit voices his newfound distrust of Sy and returns home to find Varga waiting for him. He admits that he feels "free." Dammick is convinced that Nikki killed Ray, but she refuses to speak until she gets a lawyer. Varga's man Golem attempts to kill Nikki but is stopped by Gloria, though he escapes. Dammick allows her to talk to Nikki, who only tells her to "follow the money" before being escorted to a bus bound for prison, where she is seated next to Wes Wrench. Varga's men flip the bus, killing almost everyone inside, and begin cutting through its bars to get to Nikki.
28	8	"Who Rules the Land of Denial?"	Mike Barker	Noah Hawley & Monica Beletsky	June 7, 2017	XFO03008	1.14
Wrench helps Nikki escape the bus and the pair head into the woods, chained together at the wrists. Yuri and Golem hunt them, but the two decapitate the latter and Wrench cuts Yuri's ear off with an ax. They discover a bowling alley and are greeted by Marrane inside, who discusses the passage of Rabbi Nachman of Breslov to Uman before his death, and the Jewish belief of gilgul with Nikki before showing her a kitten that he claims is Ray's reincarnation. As they leave in a car Marrane gives them, a profusely bleeding Yuri arrives in the alley, and Marrane shows him a vision of Albrecht and the thousands of Jews his Cossack ancestors killed. On Christmas, Varga puts Sy in a coma with poison. Three months later, Stussy Lots has expanded greatly, while Gloria is now a deputy and she and Lopez are still investigating Emmit. As Emmit is plagued with reminders of Ray, Varga begins drugging him to keep him calm. Wracked with guilt, he goes to the police station and asks to confess.
29	9	"Aporia"	Keith Gordon	Noah Hawley & Bob DeLaurentis	June 14, 2017	XFO03009	1.19
Varga orders Meemo to kill two men, both surnamed Stussy, in manners identical to Ennis and Ray. Emmit explains to Gloria that the feud with Ray stemmed from him convincing Ray to take their father's car after he died, leaving Emmit to take the stamps and sell them, using the money to create Stussy Lots. Despite Ray's death being an accident, he believes he deserves punishment for leaving Ray stuck in a miserable life. Dammik arrests a man who poses as Meemo and takes credit for all four deaths, giving him a story about his hatred of men with the name Stussy, which invalidates Emmit's testimony and forces Gloria to set him free. Gloria admits to Lopez her fear that she actually does not exist, and Lopez comforts her. When Gloria uses the bathroom, she finds that previously defunct automatic devices now work for her. Nikki and Wrench steal Varga's banking information and she gets him to meet, where she promises to destroy him for Ray's death. Dollard receives a package from Nikki with Varga and Stussy Lots's financial information.
30	10	"Somebody to Love"	Keith Gordon	Noah Hawley	June 21, 2017	XFO03010	1.22
Before Gloria can resign, Dollard calls her after finding her number in the file and explains that Varga's infiltration of Stussy Lots is actually a tax fraud scheme. As Varga forces Emmit to sign Stussy Lots over, he gets a call from Nikki setting a meeting spot for him to get his records back, unaware that she has already sent them. Emmit grabs a gun, but Varga easily dispatches him and leaves him on the floor with the stamp stuck to his forehead. Wrench ambushes and massacres Varga's men at the drop point while Varga escapes up an elevator shaft. Emmit goes to Stussy Lots when he wakes up but finds that it has been sold to Goldfarb, who was working with Varga. Nikki confronts him, but they are noticed by a police officer. She and the officer shoot and kill each other, and Emmit flees to his wife's house, reconciling with her. Gloria admits to her son that she cannot explain why Ennis died, but unanswered questions are the nature of the world and people who love each other need to stick together. Five years later, Sy has woken up from his coma paralyzed, while Emmit has pled guilty to tax fraud and is given probation, having possibly kept Varga's money. At a family dinner, he is killed by Wrench. Gloria, now with the DHS, is called to interview Varga as he is caught flying in from Belgium. Varga insists to her that human beings have no value beyond money and that the past can be altered, neither of which Gloria believes. She promises him that he will go to jail, while he is confident that he will be let go. They then sit in silence.

== Production ==
=== Casting ===
Ewan McGregor was cast in the male lead dual role as Emmit and Ray Stussy, and Carrie Coon plays the female lead role, Gloria Burgle. In September 2016, Mary Elizabeth Winstead was cast in a major role as Nikki Swango, while Scoot McNairy in a recurring role. In November 2016, it was announced that Jim Gaffigan had joined the main cast in the role of Donny Mashman, Gloria Burgle's partner. However, it was later announced that Gaffigan would not appear in the season due to scheduling conflicts. Mark Forward was later cast to replace him as Mashman, and Mashman's role in the story was reduced. In December 2016, several new actors joined the cast, including David Thewlis, Michael Stuhlbarg, Shea Whigham, Fred Melamed and Thomas Mann.

=== Filming ===
Filming began in early 2017 in Calgary, Alberta, where the previous two seasons were also filmed.

Regarding filming with Ewan McGregor while he is portraying dual roles, co-star Mary Elizabeth Winstead said, "For some takes, I was standing with Ewan's double and for some takes, I was standing with Ewan." She added, "Watching how the doubles interact with him and have to learn his way of walking and his posture and his way of standing was interesting. They make it feel very natural and grounded and real. They're reading the lines and the scenes are existing as they would regularly, just swapping out the people. Which is somewhat strange, but it still doesn't feel like you're doing a trick of any sort."

=== Visual style ===
As with the previous two seasons, the third season had a visual style, achieved through color grading by removing the blue channel. Noah Hawley described the technique, saying "So you take the blue channel on the digital image and you just dial it out. And what you end up with is a very distinctive look in which colors like red and orange and yellow; they just really pop in a different way. Usually in cold weather you add blue, because blue denotes cold. So it was interesting to take the blue out and see what it did to the image. And once we did that it became clear that it doesn't look at all like any of the other years, which I really liked."

== Reception ==
=== Reviews ===
The third season has received acclaim from critics. On Metacritic, it has a score of 89 out of 100 based on 32 reviews. On Rotten Tomatoes, it has a 93% rating with an average score of 8.5 out of 10 based on 225 reviews. The site's critical consensus reads: "Thanks in part to a memorable dual performance from Ewan McGregor, Fargo mostly maintains the sly wit and off-kilter sensibility it displayed in its first two seasons."

=== Accolades ===
In addition to the 6 Emmy nominations listed below, the series earned an additional ten nominations in various technical and creative categories.

Ceremony	Category	Nominee(s)	Result	Ref.
33rd TCA Awards	Outstanding Achievement in Movies, Miniseries, and Specials	Fargo	Nominated	
33rd TCA Awards	Individual Achievement in Drama	Carrie Coon (for Fargo and The Leftovers)	Won	
69th Primetime Emmy Awards	Outstanding Limited or Anthology Series	Fargo	Nominated	
69th Primetime Emmy Awards	Outstanding Lead Actor in a Limited/Anthology Series or Movie	Ewan McGregor	Nominated	
69th Primetime Emmy Awards	Outstanding Lead Actress in a Limited/Anthology Series or Movie	Carrie Coon	Nominated	
69th Primetime Emmy Awards	Outstanding Supporting Actor in a Limited/Anthology Series or Movie	David Thewlis (Episode: "The Narrow Escape Problem")	Nominated	
69th Primetime Emmy Awards	Outstanding Directing for a Limited/Anthology Series Movie	Noah Hawley for "The Law of Vacant Places"	Nominated	
69th Primetime Emmy Awards	Outstanding Writing for a Limited/Anthology Series or Movie	Noah Hawley for "The Law of Vacant Places"	Nominated	
69th Primetime Creative Arts Emmy Awards	Outstanding Casting for a Limited Series, Movie, or Special	Rachel Tenner, Jackie Lind, and Stephanie Gorin	Nominated	
69th Primetime Creative Arts Emmy Awards	Outstanding Cinematography for a Limited Series or Movie	Dana Gonzales ("The Law of Vacant Places")	Nominated	
69th Primetime Creative Arts Emmy Awards	Outstanding Single-Camera Picture Editing for a Limited Series or Movie	Regis Kimble ("The Law of Vacant Places")	Nominated	
69th Primetime Creative Arts Emmy Awards	Outstanding Single-Camera Picture Editing for a Limited Series or Movie	Curtis Thurber ("The Narrow Escape Problem")	Nominated	
69th Primetime Creative Arts Emmy Awards	Outstanding Single-Camera Picture Editing for a Limited Series or Movie	Henk van Eeghen ("Aporia")	Nominated	
69th Primetime Creative Arts Emmy Awards	Outstanding Makeup for a Limited Series or Movie (Non-Prosthetic)	Gail Kennedy, Joanne Preece, Amanda Rye, and Danielle Hanson	Nominated	
69th Primetime Creative Arts Emmy Awards	Outstanding Music Composition for a Limited Series, Movie, or Special	Jeff Russo ("Aporia")	Won	
69th Primetime Creative Arts Emmy Awards	Outstanding Hairstyling for a Limited Series or Movie	Chris Glimsdale, Judy Durbacz, Penny Thompson, and Eva Blanchard	Nominated	
69th Primetime Creative Arts Emmy Awards	Outstanding Sound Editing for a Limited Series, Movie, or Special	Kurt N. Forshager, Joe Bracciale, Martin Gwynn Jones, Brent Pickett, Claire Dobson, Robert Bertola, Alex Bullick, Tyler Whitham, Matt Decker, and John Elliot ("Who Rules the Land of Denial?")	Nominated	
69th Primetime Creative Arts Emmy Awards	Outstanding Sound Mixing for a Limited Series or Movie	Martin Lee, Kirk Lynds, Michael Playfair and Michael Perftt ("Who Rules the Land of Denial?")	Nominated	
22nd Satellite Awards	Best Actor in a Drama / Genre Series	Ewan McGregor	Nominated	
22nd Satellite Awards	Best Actor in a Miniseries or TV Film	Ewan McGregor	Nominated	
8th Critics' Choice Television Awards	Best Limited Series	Fargo	Nominated	
8th Critics' Choice Television Awards	Best Actor in a Movie/Limited Series	Ewan McGregor	Won	
8th Critics' Choice Television Awards	Best Actress in a Movie/Limited Series	Carrie Coon	Nominated	
8th Critics' Choice Television Awards	Best Supporting Actor in a Movie/Limited Series	David Thewlis	Nominated	
8th Critics' Choice Television Awards	Best Supporting Actress in a Movie/Limited Series	Mary Elizabeth Winstead	Nominated	
75th Golden Globe Awards	Best TV Movie or Limited Series	Fargo	Nominated	
75th Golden Globe Awards	Best Actor – Miniseries or Television Film	Ewan McGregor	Won	
75th Golden Globe Awards	Best Supporting Actor – Miniseries or Television Film	David Thewlis	Nominated	
Producers Guild of America Awards 2017	Outstanding Producer of Long-Form Television	Fargo	Nominated	
American Cinema Editors Awards 2018	Best Edited Drama Series for Commercial Television	Andrew Seklir ("Who Rules the Land of Denial?")	Won	
54th Cinema Audio Society Awards	Outstanding Achievement in Sound Mixing for a Television Movie or Mini-Series	Michael Playfair, Kirk Lynds, Martin Lee, Michael Perfitt	Nominated	
5th Location Managers Guild Awards	Outstanding Locations in a Contemporary Television Series	Robert Hilton	Nominated	
44th Saturn Awards	Best Action-Thriller Television Series	Fargo	Nominated	
44th Saturn Awards	Best Actress on Television	Mary Elizabeth Winstead	Nominated	
