= Shaun Evans =

British actor and director born 1980)

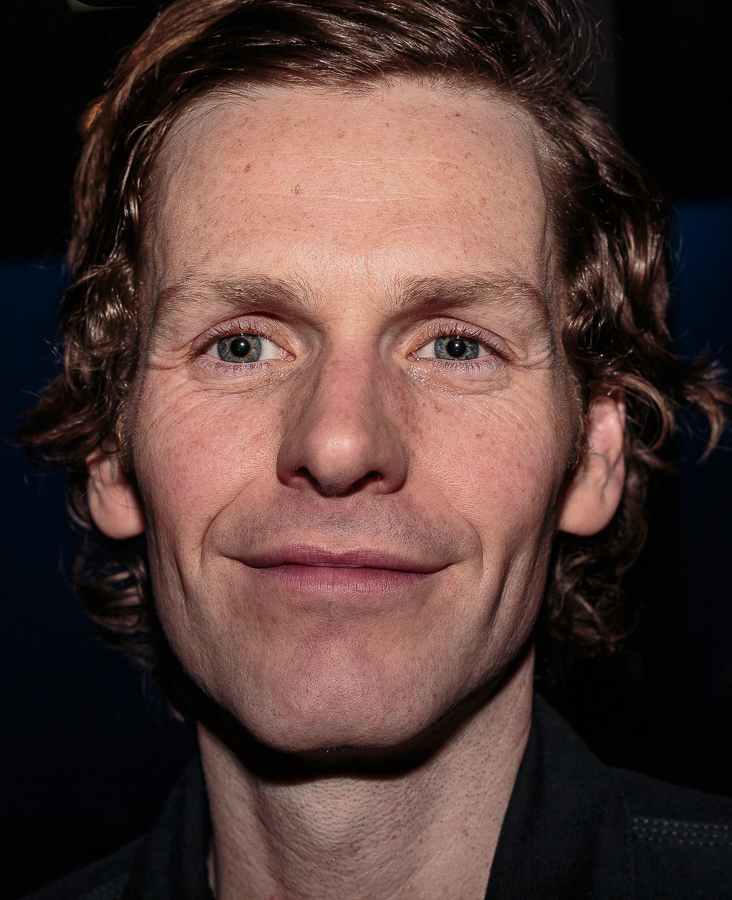
- Evans in Hello Goodbye at the Hampstead Theatre in 2015
- Born: 6 March 1980 (age 46); Liverpool, England
- Education: National Youth Theatre; Guildhall School of Music and Drama
- Occupation: Actor
- Years active: 2001–present

Shaun Evans (born 6 March 1980) is an English actor. He is best known for playing a young Endeavour Morse in the ITV drama series Endeavour and Coxswain Elliot Glover in Vigil.

== Early life ==
Evans was born on 6 March 1980. He is a Liverpudlian with Irish parents. His father worked as a taxi driver and his mother was a hospital worker. He has a brother who is 11 months his senior. He gained a scholarship to St Edward's College in Liverpool's West Derby suburb, which he attended from 1991 to 1998 and where he began acting in school productions. He completed a course with the National Youth Theatre in London before fully moving to London around the age of 18 to study at the Guildhall School of Music and Drama.

== Career ==
=== Acting ===
Evans's first major role was that of French teacher John Paul Keating in the Channel 4 comedy-drama Teachers during its second series in 2002. The following year he made his feature film debut in The Boys from County Clare, starring alongside Bernard Hill, Colm Meaney and Andrea Corr.

Additional screen credits include Sam’s Game, Being Julia, The Situation, Cashback, Gone, Boy A, Telstar: The Joe Meek Story, Princess Kaiulani and Clive Barker's horror film Dread.

On television, Evans was featured in the 2002 docudrama The Project and was seen as the Earl of Southampton in the miniseries The Virgin Queen, which premiered in November 2005 on Masterpiece Theatre on PBS in the US before airing on the BBC in January 2006. His stage work includes a UK tour of the award-winning play Blue/Orange by Joe Penhall.

Recent television appearances include Murder City, BBC's Ashes to Ashes, Gentley's Last Stand and the four-part drama The Take from the novel by Martina Cole on Sky1. Evans also starred in Sparkle alongside Bob Hoskins and Stockard Channing (2007). Shaun played Lawrence Elton in the Acorn Series, Inspector George Gently, S1, E1; "Gently Go Man" 2007.

In 2009, he portrayed Kurt Cobain in the Roy Smiles play Kurt and Sid at the Trafalgar Studios opposite Danny Dyer as Sex Pistols bassist Sid Vicious.

In 2012, Evans also played the role of new pupil Daniel in the BBC legal drama Silk alongside Maxine Peake and starred in the ITV series The Last Weekend.

Starting in 2012, Evans played the young Inspector Morse in Endeavour, which focuses on the detective's early career. The initial episode was broadcast on 2 January 2012. Endeavour was then recommissioned for nine further series by ITV.

On 23 May 2022, ITV confirmed that Endeavour would end production after a decade on air with a total of 36 episodes.

In January and February 2015, Evans starred as Alex in the Peter Souter play Hello/Goodbye, with Miranda Raison playing his love interest.

In 2021, Evans starred as Elliott Glover, coxswain of the fictional submarine HMS Vigil, in the TV series of the same name.

In September 2024, it was announced that Evans will portray John Hughes in the new ITV espionage thriller, Betrayal.

In October 2026, Evans joined the cast of the second series of the British BBC crime drama This City Is Ours.

=== Directing ===
Evans directed three episodes of the BBC medical drama Casualty which aired on 8 July 2017, and 19 and 26 May 2018. He also directed four episodes of Endeavour: 'Apollo' in series 6, which aired on 17 February 2019; 'Oracle' in series 7, which aired on 9 February 2020; and 'Striker' in series 8, which aired on 12 September 2021. On 22 May 2022, he directed 'Prelude', the first episode of the prequel's ninth and final series which aired on 26 February 2023.

== Filmography ==
=== Film ===
| Year | Title | Role | Notes |
|---|---|---|---|
| 2003 | The Boys and Girl from County Clare | Teddy | |
| 2004 | Being Julia | Tom Fennel | |
| 2006 | Cashback | Sean Higgins | |
| 2006 | The Situation | Wesley | |
| 2007 | Gone | Alex | |
| 2007 | Sparkle | Sam Sparkes | |
| 2007 | Boy A | Chris | |
| 2008 | Telstar: The Joe Meek Story | Billy Kuy | |
| 2009 | Dread | Quaid | |
| 2009 | Princess Kaiulani | Clive Davies | |
| 2011 | Wreckers | Nick | |
| 2011 | Archaeology | Noah | Short film |
| 2014 | War Book | Tom | |

=== Television ===
| Year | Title | Role | Notes |
|---|---|---|---|
| 2001 | Sam's Game | Tom | Episodes 3 & 5: "Mumma's" and "Slogan" |
| 2002 | Teachers | John Paul Keating | Series regular. Series 2; Episodes 1–10 |
| 2002 | The Project | Andy Clark | Television film |
| 2005 | The Virgin Queen | Earl of Southampton | Mini-series; Episodes 2 & 4 |
| 2006 | Murder City | Ryan Everitt | Series 2; Episode 3: "Death of a Ladies' Man" |
| 2007 | Inspector George Gently | Lawrence Elton | Series 1; Episode: "Gently Go Man" |
| 2009 | Ashes to Ashes | PC Kevin Hales | Series 2; Episodes 1 & 3 |
| 2009 | The Take | Jimmy Jackson | Mini-series; Episodes 1–4 |
| 2010 | Come Rain Come Shine | David Mitchell | Television film |
| 2011 | The Defenders | Ricky Hall | Series 1; Episode 17: "Nevada v. Greene" |
| 2011 | Monroe | Lee Bannister | Series 1; Episode 1 |
| 2012 | Whitechapel | Sly Driscoll | Series 3; Episodes 1 & 2 |
| 2012 | Silk | Daniel Lomas | Series 2; Episodes 4–6 |
| 2012 | The Last Weekend | Ian | Mini-series; Episodes 1–3 |
| 2012–2023 | Endeavour | DC/Sgt. Endeavour Morse | Main role. Series 1–9; 36 episodes |
| 2015 | The Scandalous Lady W | Sir Richard Worsley | Television film |
| 2021 | Vigil | Elliot Glover | Regular role. Series 1; Episodes 1–6 |
| 2024 | Until I Kill You | John Sweeney | Main role. Mini-series; Episodes 1–4 |
| 2026 | Betrayal | John Hughes | Main role. 4 episodes |
| 2026 | This City Is Ours | Ozzie Thompson | Main role. Series 2; 8 episodes |

=== Theatre ===
| Year | Play | Role | Venue | Notes |
|---|---|---|---|---|
| 2005 | Blue/Orange | Bruce | Crucible Theatre, Sheffield & UK Tour | |
| 2009 | Kurt and Sid | Kurt Cobain | Trafalgar Theatre, London | |
| 2014 | Miss Julie / Black Comedy | Jean / Harold Gorringe | Chichester Festival Theatre, Chichester | Double bill |
| 2015 | Hello/Goodbye | Alex | Hampstead Theatre, London | |
| 2021 | Manor | Ted Farrier | Lyttelton Theatre, London | |
| 2024 | Here In America | Gadg (Elia Kazan) | Orange Tree Theatre, London | |

== Awards and nominations ==
| Year | Award | Category | Work | Result |
|---|---|---|---|---|
| 2013 | TV Choice Awards | Best Actor | Endeavour | Nominated |
| 2014 | Crime Thriller Awards | Best Leading Actor | Endeavour | Nominated |
