= The Take (TV series) =

- Also known as: Martina Cole's The Take
- Genre: Crime drama
- Written by: Neil Biswas
- Directed by: David Drury
- Starring: Tom Hardy; Shaun Evans; Kierston Wareing; Charlotte Riley; Margot Leicester; Brian Cox
- Opening theme: Kasabian – "Club Foot"
- Composer: Ruth Barrett
- Country of origin: United Kingdom
- Original language: English
- No. of series: 1
- No. of episodes: 4

Production
- Executive producer: Helen Flint
- Producer: Willow Grylls
- Cinematography: Owen McPolin
- Editor: Chris Ridsdale
- Running time: 50 minutes
- Production company: Company Pictures

Original release
- Network: Sky1
- Release: 17 June – 1 July 2009

The Take is a four-part British television crime drama series, adapted by Neil Biswas from the novel by Martina Cole, that first broadcast on Sky1 on 17 June 2009. Directed by David Drury, The Take follows the activities of criminal sociopath Freddie Jackson (Tom Hardy), who has recently been released from prison, only to find that his cousin Jimmy (Shaun Evans) is attempting to make a name for himself on the back of his reputation. The series also stars Brian Cox, Kierston Wareing, Margot Leicester and Charlotte Riley among others.

Principal shooting for the series took place in Dublin. As well as original music by Ruth Barrett, the series also makes use of Kasabian's "Club Foot" as its opening theme. The Take was the first of two Cole novels to be adapted by Company Pictures for Sky1, the other being The Runaway, starring Jack O'Connell and Joanna Vanderham, that followed in 2011. The Take was released on Region 2 DVD on 6 July 2009 by ITV Studios Home Entertainment.

The series aired in the United States between 2 and 23 December 2009 on Encore. The first episode gathered 180,000 viewers, while the second attracted 152,000. The series was also released on Region 1 DVD on 28 August 2012, via BFS Entertainment. The series received critical acclaim for Hardy's portrayal of Freddie Jackson. Notably, Hardy and Charlotte Riley, who first met whilst working together on the series, later married.

== Plot ==
Freddie Jackson (Tom Hardy) has just been released from prison. He has done his time, made the right connections and now he is ready to use them. His wife Jackie (Kierston Wareing) dreams of having her husband home but she has forgotten the rows and the girls Freddie cannot leave alone. His younger cousin, Jimmy (Shaun Evans), dreams of making a name for himself on Freddie's coattails. At first, Freddie gets everything he ever wanted and Jimmy is taken along for the ride: a growing crime empire that gives them all the respect and money they have hungered for. Behind it all sits Ozzy (Brian Cox) - the legendary criminal godfather who manipulates Freddie and Jimmy's fates from the prison cell.

Bitter, resentful and increasingly unstable, Jackie sees her life crumble while her little sister Maggie's (Charlotte Riley) star rises. In love with Freddie's cousin Jimmy, Maggie is determined not to end up like her sister. Freddie and Jackie watch Jimmy and Maggie achieve all the dreams that they failed to realise: love, family, stability, and respect. Resentment and an inability to control himself force Freddie to put the business and his family at risk. Torn between being loyal to a cousin he loves and being true to his own destiny, Jimmy is forced to decide between protecting Freddie or the life he has built with Maggie.

== Cast ==
- Tom Hardy as Freddie Jackson Jr.
- Shaun Evans as Jimmy Jackson
- Kierston Wareing as Jackie Jackson
- Charlotte Riley as Maggie Summers
- Margot Leicester as Lena Summers
- Brian Cox as Ozzy
- Jane Wood as Maddie
- Steve Nicolson as Lewis
- John Ashton as Joseph
- Megan Jossa as Kim
- Sara Stewart as Patricia
- Obi Abili as Des
- Macdara Joyce as Little Jimmy
- René Zagger as Altay Nevzat
- Sam Vincenti as Fatik Nevzat
- Nicholas Day as Freddie Jackson Snr.
- Mark Huberman as Harry
- Chelsea O'Toole as Kimberly
- David Schofield as Siddy Clancy
- Hayley Angel Holt as Kitty Mason
- Sammy Williams as little Freddie

== Episodes ==
| No. | Title | Directed by | Written by | Original release date | UK viewers (millions) |
|---|---|---|---|---|---|
| 1 | "Episode 1" | David Drury | Neil Biswas | 17 June 2009 | 0.88 |
Freddie Jackson is out of prison and looking to make a name for himself with the help of his cousin Jimmy and powerful new ally Ozzy - a legendary crime boss controlling the East End crime empire.
| 2 | "Episode 2" | David Drury | Neil Biswas | 17 June 2009 | 0.89 |
There's a new killing to be made and Freddie and Jimmy are forming alliances with the help of Ozzy. When Freddie's behavior takes a shocking turn for the worse and almost ruins a deal, Jimmy takes control.
| 3 | "Episode 3" | David Drury | Neil Biswas | 24 June 2009 | 0.70 |
Little Freddie seems to be following in his father's shadow after creating a showdown between sisters Jackie and Maggie. Whilst Freddie is making plans to take over the empire by plotting an attack on Ozzy in prison.
| 4 | "Episode 4" | David Drury | Neil Biswas | 1 July 2009 | 0.93 |
Jimmy forces Freddie to take responsibility for his son's actions when Little Jimmy is found dead at the hands of Little Freddie. Maggie finally reveals the truth about Little Jimmy's father causing a confrontation between Maggie and Freddie.

== Awards and nominations ==
| Year | Ceremony | Category | Recipients and nominees | Result | Ref |
|---|---|---|---|---|---|
| 2010 | IFTA Award | Best Make Up & Hair | Lorraine Glynn, Morna Ferguson | Won | |
| 2010 | IFTA Award | Best Production Design | Susie Cullen | Nominated | |
| 2010 | RTS Television Award | Best Male Actor | Tom Hardy | Nominated | |
