= Crime (TV series) =

British television series

- Genre: Crime thriller
- Based on: Crime by Irvine Welsh
- Screenplay by: Irvine Welsh; Dean Cavanagh
- Directed by: David Blair; James Strong; Trygve Allister Diesen; Anthony Neilson
- Starring: Dougray Scott
- Original language: English
- No. of series: 2
- No. of episodes: 12

Production
- Executive producers: Pamela Hansson; Dean Cavanagh; Douglas Scott; James Strong; Richard Tulk-Hart; Irvine Welsh; Tony Wood
- Producers: Helen Ostler; David Blair
- Cinematography: David Liddell; Will Pugh; Ashley Rowe
- Editors: Melanie Viner-Cueno; Barry Moen; Nikki McChristie; Ulrike Münche
- Production companies: Buccaneer; Off Grid Film and TV; Blazing Griffin

Original release
- Network: BritBox; ITVX
- Release: 18 November 2021 (BritBox)

Crime (also known as Irvine Welsh's Crime) is a British crime drama television series, an adaptation of the Irvine Welsh novel of the same name. The 6-episode first series was co-written by Welsh and Dean Cavanagh and broadcast in 2021 on BritBox, later made available on ITVX. It stars Dougray Scott as the detective Ray Lennox. Scott won an International Emmy Award and a BAFTA in November 2022 for his performance. A second series premiered on 21 September 2023 on ITVX.

== Synopsis ==
=== Series 1 ===
DI Ray Lennox and DS Drummond investigate a schoolgirl's abduction.

== Cast ==
=== Main ===
- Dougray Scott as DI Ray Lennox
- Joanna Vanderham as DS Amanda Drummond
- Jamie Sives as DI Dougie Gillman
- Michael Abubakar as DC Stuart McCorkel
- Gordon Kennedy as DI Eddie Rogers
- Angela Griffin as Trudi Love
- Ken Stott as Chief Superintendent Bob Toal
- Derek Riddell as Richie Gulliver
- Jonathan Kerrigan as Mark McKendrick
- Stuart Martin as Stuart Lennox
- Ellie Haddington as Avril Lennox
- Ewan Stewart as John Lennox
- Laura Fraser as Sally Hart
- John Simm as Gareth Horsborough

=== Recurring ===
- Emma Hartley-Miller as Angela Hamil
- Sarah McCardie as DCI Gillian Glover
- Alison McKenzie as Estelle
- Brian Bovell as George Marsden
- Kim Chapman as Helena
- Sorcha Groundsell as Carly
- Paige Green as Britney Hamil
- Ian Hanmore as Tommy Loughran
- Moyo Akandé as Maria Pearson
- Bhav Joshi as Gary Franklin
- Brian James Leys as Michael Garrett

== Episodes ==
=== Series overview ===
Series	Episodes	Originally released
1	6	18 November 2021
2	6	21 September 2023

=== Series 1 (2021) ===
No. overall	No. in season	Title	Directed by	Written by	Original release date
1	1	"Episode 1"	James Strong	Irvine Welsh & Dean Cavanagh	18 November 2021
2	2	"Episode 2"	James Strong	Irvine Welsh & Dean Cavanagh	18 November 2021
3	3	"Episode 3"	James Strong	Irvine Welsh & Dean Cavanagh	18 November 2021
4	4	"Episode 4"	David Blair	Irvine Welsh & Dean Cavanagh	18 November 2021
5	5	"Episode 5"	David Blair	Irvine Welsh	18 November 2021
6	6	"Episode 6"	David Blair	Irvine Welsh	18 November 2021

=== Series 2 (2023) ===
No. overall	No. in season	Title	Directed by	Written by	Original release date
7	1	"Episode 1"	Trygve Allister Diesen	Irvine Welsh	21 September 2023
8	2	"Episode 2"	Trygve Allister Diesen	Irvine Welsh	28 September 2023
9	3	"Episode 3"	Trygve Allister Diesen	Irvine Welsh	5 October 2023
10	4	"Episode 4"	David Blair	Irvine Welsh	12 October 2023
11	5	"Episode 5"	David Blair	Irvine Welsh	19 October 2023
12	6	"Episode 6"	Unknown	Irvine Welsh	26 October 2023

== Production ==
=== First series ===
On 23 July 2020, BritBox announced that Irvine Welsh would be adapting Crime as a six-part miniseries for streaming service, adapting his own book alongside Dean Cavanagh. The series is set in Edinburgh and filmed there and Glasgow.

=== Second series ===
In October 2022, a second six-part series started filming in Scotland with Welsh and Cavanagh again scripting. Directors for the second series include Trygve Allister Diesen and Anthony Neilson. Production is by Buccaneer and Off Grid Film and TV. Production crews were reported in Glasgow's West End, with filming occurring on Horselethill Road and Rosslyn Terrace. Filming continued in Glasgow into November 2022.

Scott was quoted as saying "Season 2 takes us even deeper into Lennox's past, and helps us understand his persona even more. I couldn't be happier." Among those returning for series two are Ken Stott, Joanna Vanderham, John Simm and Derek Riddell.

== Broadcast ==
The first series premiered on BritBox on 18 November 2021.

The second series premiered on ITVX on 21 September 2023, and the first series become available via ITVX in 2023.

== Reception ==
=== Critical response ===
Anita Singh in The Daily Telegraph described the performance of Scott as "lifting" the police procedural "out of the ordinary" by delivering "every line with a burning intensity" that still "manages at the same time to convey the character's emotional fragility, and the toll that his job is taking". Lucy Mangan in The Guardian was less effusive, but said that Welsh "pushed the limits of what we normally see from the troubled detective at the centre of such shows". Carol Midgely in The Times said "I thought it was terrific, give or take the odd daft scene" and "few writers could write about such horror and still make it funny".

== Accolades ==
Scott was nominated at the International Emmy Awards for his performance. Scott won the International Emmy Award for Best Actor in November 2022.
