= Philippe Kress =

Danish cinematographer

- Born: July 27, 1972 (age 54); Taastrup, Denmark
- Occupation: Cinematographer
- Notable work: Riviera; King Charles III (film); Ragnarok (TV series); Helmer & Son; Blekingegadebanden

Philippe Kress (born July 27, 1972) is a Danish cinematographer best known for his work as director of photography on Riviera, King Charles III and Ragnarok, as well as the most expensive documentary in Danish film history Blekingegadebanden.

He has been nominated for several notable film awards, including the Amanda Award (2015), RiverRun International Film Award (2021) and Academy Award (2007).

== Early life and career ==
Kress started his film career in 1999 and has worked on documentaries, TV series and feature films. He has been responsible for photography of over 40 films, most notably Irish television drama series Riviera, history television film King Charles III and fantasy TV series Ragnarok.

He was the director of photography for The Invisible Cell (Danish: Blekingegadebanden), the most expensive documentary in Danish film history.

Kress was responsible for the photography in Denmark's 2007 Oscar entry, Helmer & Son, directed by Søren Pilmark.

== Personal life ==
His brother Eric Kress is also a film photographer.

== Awards ==
- 2021 – RiverRun International Film Festival, Best Cinematography Award for A Beautiful Curse
- 2015 – Amanda Awards, Nominated for Best Cinematography for Beatles
- 2007 – Academy Award nomination for Helmer & Son

== Filmography ==
=== Feature films ===
- Centervagt - (2021)
- A Beautiful Curse - (2021)
- King Charles III - (2016)
- Three Heists and a Hamster - (2016)
- April 9 - (2015)
- Beatles - (2014)
- All For Two - (2013)
- Eddie: The Sleepwalking Cannibal - (2011)
- All For One - (2010)
- Rosa Morena - (2009)
- Party Therapy - (2009)
- The Invisible Cell - (2008)
- Lotto - (2003)
- The Big Day - (2005)

=== Shortfilms ===
- Helmer & Son - (2007)
- Gabriels Word - (2002)
- Halleluja - (2002)
- Julie - (2001)
- Hjemvendt - (2001)
