= James Lance =

English actor (born 1974)

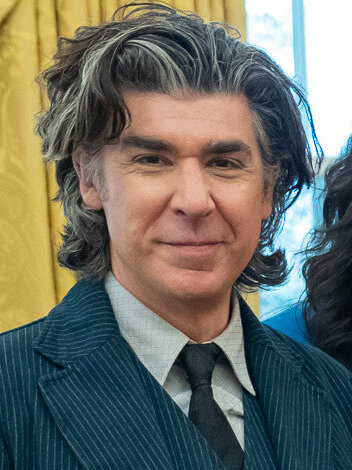
- Lance in the Oval Office in 2023
- Born: James Frederick Grenville Lance; 29 September 1974 (age 51); Southampton, England
- Occupation: Actor
- Years active: 1988–present
- Spouse: Kate Quilton (m. 2016; div. 2026)
- Children: 1

James Frederick Grenville Lance (born 29 September 1974) is an English actor, best known for his appearances in a number of British comedy series and as Trent Crimm on the British-American comedy series Ted Lasso, for which he was nominated for a Primetime Emmy Award for Outstanding Guest Actor in a Comedy Series in 2022.

== Early life ==
Lance was born in Southampton on 29 September 1974 and grew up in Westbury-sub-Mendip, Somerset. He attended the Sylvia Young Theatre School.

== Career ==
Lance first started acting in 1988 in two Persil Liquid adverts with British actor Peter Sallis. His appearances in comedy series include Top Buzzer, I'm Alan Partridge, Absolute Power, Spaced, Absolutely Fabulous, Smack the Pony, The Upper Hand, The Book Group, 2point4 Children, Rescue Me, Doc Martin, People Like Us, No Heroics, Toast of London, Saxondale and, most recently, as the recurring character Trent Crimm, a sportswriter at The Independent, on the Apple TV+ series Ted Lasso.

Drama appearances have included Teachers, Boy Meets Girl, The Impressionists, Sensitive Skin, Marple, Being Human, Midsomer Murders, Moving Wallpaper, Black Mirror, The Canterville Ghost and The Famous Five.

Lance has also appeared in the films Late Night Shopping, The Search for John Gissing, Marie Antoinette, Bronson and Bel Ami.

Lance voiced several UK TV commercials for brands such as Maybelline, Wrigley's Extra, the AA and Moneysupermarket.com.

Lance appeared on stage as Miles at the Trafalgar Studios in May 2009 in Marcus Markou's play Ordinary Dreams; Or How to Survive a Meltdown with Flair. He portrayed Eric Idle at the 2009 Edinburgh Festival in a play called Pythonesque by writer Roy Smiles.

== Personal life ==
In 2016, Lance married Kate Quilton. Lance and Quilton separated in late 2023 and divorced in early 2026. The couple have a son, born in 2018.

== Filmography ==
=== Film ===
Year	Title	Role	Notes
1995	A Fistful of Fingers	Grindolini	
1998	The Conversation		Short film
2001	Late Night Shopping	Vincent	
2001	The Search for John Gissing	Donny the Janitor	
2001	Subterrain	Kieran	
2001	It's Not You, It's Me	Henry	Short film
2004	Call Register	Julian	Short film
2005	The Lead	The Lead	Short film
2006	Marie Antoinette	Léonard	
2007	Hard to Swallow	Carlos	Short film
2007	Rubbish	Julian	Short film
2008	Bronson	Phil	
2009	City Rats	Chris	
2009	Mr. Right	Harry	
2011	Man in Fear	Gilchrist	Short film
2011	Departure	Jack Taylor	Short film
2011	Happy Birthday Jim	Jim	Short film
2012	Bel Ami	François Laroche	
2013	The Look of Love	Carl Snitcher	
2013	Legendary	Doug McConnel	
2014	Northern Soul	DJ Ray Henderson	
2015	Swansong	Simon Dunton	
2015	January	Laurence	
2017	The Bookshop	Milo North	
2020	Concrete Plans	Richard	
2021	I'm Not in Love	Rob's Dad	
2021	Me, Myself and Di	Chris Craven	
2022	The Mountain	The Milk	Short film
2022	Hounded	Hugo Redwick	
2023	The Devil Went Down to Islington	Nick Kolski	
2024	Hanging	Narrator (voice)	Short film
2024	The Salt Path	Grant	
2025	Tinsel Town	Spencer	

=== Television ===
Year	Title	Role	Notes
1989	Jackanory	Will	4 episodes
1991	The Upper Hand	Rick McGuire	Episode: "The Babysitter"
1991	Teenage Health Freak	Contestant	Episode: "Blast Off!"
1992	Absolutely Fabulous	Daniel	Episode: "ISO Tank"
1993	Conjugal Rites	Boyfriend	Episode: "Bedtime Story"
1994	Second Thoughts	Ian	Episode: "She's Leaving Home"
1994	Waiting for God	Boy in hospital	Episode: "Trouble with Men"
1995	The Bill	Alexis Vasiliakis	Episode: "Smoke Gets in Your Eyes"
1996	Family Money	Youth	TV series
1997	I'm Alan Partridge	Ben	5 episodes
1998–1999	2point4 Children	Keith	2 episodes
1999	People Like Us	Mark	Episode: "The Estate Agent"
1999	Spaced	Richard	3 episodes
1999–2002	Smack the Pony		5 episodes
2000	Safe as Houses	Man on Estate	TV film
2002	Rescue Me	Guy	6 episodes
2002–2003	The Book Group	Lachlan Glendenning / Barney Glendenning	12 episodes
2002–2003	Teachers	Matt Harvey	14 episodes
2003–2005	Absolute Power	Jamie Front	12 episodes
2004	Top Buzzer	Sticky	10 episodes
2005–2007	Sensitive Skin	Orlando Jackson	7 episodes
2006	The Impressionists	Bazille	Episode: "#1.1"
2006	Saxondale	Matt	Episode: "Cockroaches"
2006	Losing It	Leo	TV film
2007	The Afternoon Play	Tom Hunter	Episode: "The Real Deal"
2007	Biffovision	Mr. Hugo	TV film
2007–2009	Katy Brand's Big Ass Show		15 episodes
2008	The Last Enemy	Bryan Holland	2 episodes
2008	Hotel Babylon	Tom	Episode: "#3.6"
2008	No Heroics	Timebomb	6 episodes
2008	Marple	Dr Geoffrey Thomas	Episode: "Murder is Easy"
2008–2009	Moving Wallpaper	Tom Warren	18 episodes
2009	Boy Meets Girl	Ali	4 episodes
2012	Being Human	Kirby	2 episodes
2013	Black Mirror	Conor Simpson	Episode: "The Waldo Moment"
2013	Toast of London	Martin Aynuss	Episode: "Vanity Project"
2014	Siblings	Rich	Episode: "Vet Drugs"
2014	Babylon	Granger	3 episodes
2015	Midsomer Murders	Silas Raven	Episode: "The Dagger Club"
2016	Houdini & Doyle	Barrett Underhill	Episode: "Spring-Heel'd Jack"
2016	I Want My Wife Back	Julian Wolverton	2 episodes
2016	Hoff the Record	Anton	Episode: "The Horror"
2016	Mount Pleasant	Adam Wyatt	6 episodes
2018	Benidorm	Angelo	Episode: "#10.9"
2018	Agatha Raisin	Jonny Shawpart	Episode: "The Wizard of Evesham"
2019	Doc Martin	Nathan Fowler	Episode: "Equilibrium"
2020	Pennyworth	Jacques Duval	Episode: "The Hunted Fox"
2020–2026	Ted Lasso	Trent Crimm	23 episodes
2021	Murder, They Hope	Clive	Episode: "The Bunny Trap"
2021	The Canterville Ghost	Hiram Otis	4 episodes
2022	Fate: The Winx Saga	Uncle Arthur	Episode: "Your Newfound Popularity"
2023–2024	The Famous Five	Uncle Quentin	3 episodes
2025	NCIS: Tony & Ziva	Archie	Episode: "Dark Mirror"
2025	Beyond Paradise	Terry Finch	Episode: "Christmas Special 2025"

=== Music videos ===
Title	Year	Artist	Role	Notes
Miss Erotica	2025	Peach PRC	"The Guy"	

== Awards and nominations ==
Year	Association	Category	Project	Result	Ref.
2021	Screen Actors Guild Awards	Outstanding Performance by an Ensemble in a Comedy Series	Ted Lasso	Nominated	
2022	Online Film & Television Association	Best Guest Actor in a Comedy Series	Ted Lasso	Nominated	
2022	Primetime Emmy Awards	Outstanding Guest Actor in a Comedy Series	Ted Lasso	Nominated	
2023	Screen Actors Guild Awards	Outstanding Performance by an Ensemble in a Comedy Series	Ted Lasso	Nominated	
