= Joanna Vanderham =

Scottish actress

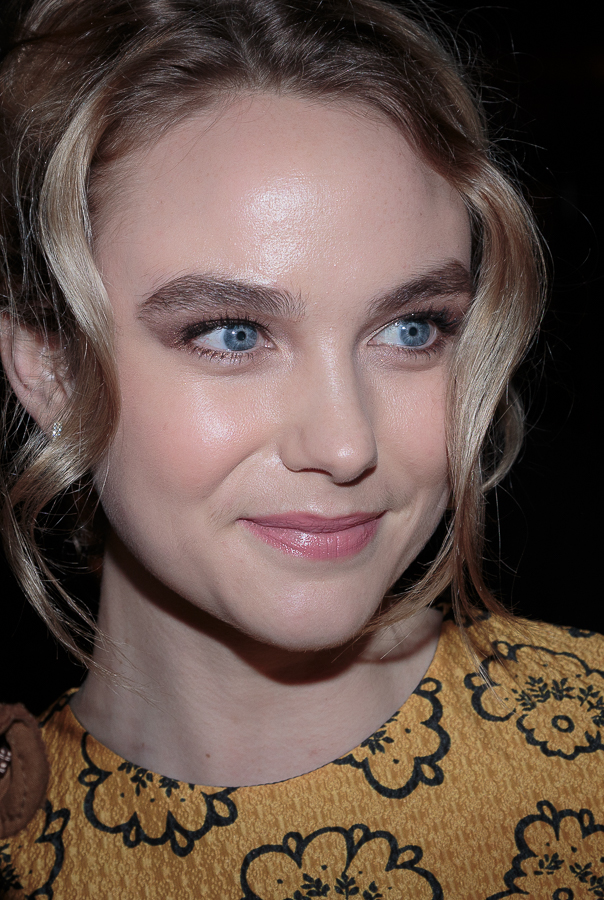
- Vanderham at the 2015 British Independent Film Awards
- Born: Joanna Rosie-Le Van Der Ham; Perth, Scotland
- Education: Royal Welsh College of Music & Drama
- Occupation: Actress
- Years active: 2011–present
- Mother: Jill Belch

Joanna Vanderham (born 18 October 1991) is a Scottish actress. She was nominated for an International Emmy Award for her debut role in the Sky One crime drama The Runaway (2011).

== Early life and education ==
Joanna Vanderham was born in Perth, Scotland, and grew up in Scone and Dundee. Her father Tom, a Dutch businessman, and mother Jill Belch, a Scottish professor of cardiovascular research at Ninewells Hospital, divorced when she was a child. She has two sisters and a brother.

She attended Robert Douglas Memorial School in Scone and then the High School of Dundee. She then went on to study acting at the Royal Welsh College of Music & Drama in Cardiff.

== Career ==
Vanderham made her screen debut in 2011 as Cathy Connor in the Sky TV six-part crime drama The Runaway, an adaptation of the novel by Martina Cole. She also had a supporting role in the BBC One biographical drama Young James Herriot.

From 2012 to 2013, in two series, Vanderham starred as Denise Lovett in the BBC television series The Paradise, written by Bill Gallagher and loosely based on the novel Au Bonheur des Dames by Émile Zola. She made her film debut as Margo in What Maisie Knew with Alexander Skarsgård and Julianne Moore.

Vanderham played society girl Pamela Luscombe in the BBC drama Dancing on the Edge, directed by Stephen Poliakoff.

In 2015, she appeared as Katherine "Kitty" McVitie in BBC Two period drama series Banished and Marian Maudsley in the BBC One romance television film The Go-Between.

Vanderham received a Commendation at the 2016 Ian Charleson Awards for her performance as Queen Anne in Richard III at the Almeida Theatre in London.

Also in 2016, Vanderham starred in the romance television film The Boy with the Topknot opposite Sacha Dhawan. The following year, she played Claire Elliot in the miniseries One of Us (also known as Retribution) and the younger version of Vanessa Redgrave's character Flora in the two-part drama Man in an Orange Shirt. In 2019, Vanderham joined the main cast of the American action series Warrior as Penelope Blake. She played Atropos, a recurring character in the fifth season of DC's Legends of Tomorrow. She starred as DS Amanda Drummond opposite Dougray Scott in the 2021 BritBox and later ITVX series Crime, an adaptation of the novel of the same name by Irvine Welsh.

Also in 2025, she played the infamous Diana Mitford in the Britbox later BBC series Outrageous.

== Personal life ==
Vanderham lives in Hackney, East London.

== Filmography ==
=== Film ===
Year	Title	Role	Notes
2012	What Maisie Knew	Margo	
2013	Blackwood	Jessica	
2016	And Then I Was French	Cara	
2016	Queimafobia	Alice	Short films
2020	A Song Still Inside	Laura	Short films
2022	Selkie	Selkie	Short films
2022	Eddie & Sunny	Sunny	

=== Television ===
Year	Title	Role	Notes
2011	The Runaway	Cathy Connor	Main role; miniseries; 6 episodes
2011	Young James Herriot	Jenny Muirhead	Miniseries; 3 episodes
2012	Above Suspicion	Amanda Delany	3 episodes
2012–2013	The Paradise	Denise Lovett	Main role; 16 episodes
2013	Dancing on the Edge	Pamela Luscombe	Main role; miniseries; 6 episodes
2013	Marple	Ellie	Episode: "Endless Night"
2015	Banished	Katherine "Kitty" McVitie	Main role; miniseries; 7 episodes
2015	The Go-Between	Marian Maudsley	Television film
2016	One of Us	Claire Elliot	Main role; miniseries; 4 episodes
2017	Man in an Orange Shirt	Flora Talbot	Miniseries; Episode 1
2017	The Boy with the Topknot	Laura	Television film
2019	The Tanner	Caitlin	Episode: "Babe's Got a Back Problem"
2019–2020	Warrior	Penelope Blake	Main role; 20 episodes
2020	Legends of Tomorrow	Atropos	Recurring role; 5 episodes
2021–present	Crime	DS Amanda Drummond	Main role; 14 episodes
2022	The Control Room	Sam	Main role; 3 episodes
2025	Outrageous	Diana Mitford	Main cast: 6 episodes

== Stage ==
Year	Play	Role	Company
2012	The Promise	Lika	Donmar Warehouse / Trafalgar
2015	The Dazzle	Millie Ashmore	Found111 / Michael Grandage Co.
2014	Othello	Desdemona	Royal Shakespeare Company
2016	Richard III	Queen Anne	Almeida Theatre
2024	Double Feature	Tippi Hedren	Hampstead Theatre
2025	A Streetcar Named Desire	Blanche DuBois	Crucible Theatre

== Awards and nominations ==
Year	Award	Category	Work	Result	Ref
2012	International Emmy Awards	Best Actress	The Runaway	Nominated	
2016	Ian Charleson Awards		Richard III	Nominated	
