= Creation Stories (film) =

2021 film about Alan McGee and Creation Records

- Directed by: Nick Moran
- Screenplay by: Irvine Welsh; Dean Cavanagh
- Based on: Creation Stories by Alan McGee
- Produced by: Ben Dillon; Shelley Hammond; Nathan McGough; Hollie Richmond; Orian Williams
- Starring: Ewen Bremner; Suki Waterhouse; Jason Flemyng; Thomas Turgoose; Jason Isaacs
- Cinematography: Roberto Schaefer
- Edited by: Emma Gaffney
- Production companies: Burning Wheel Productions; Head Gear Films; Metrol Technology; Bohemia Media; Adirondack Media Group; Carte Blanche
- Distributed by: Sky Cinema
- Release date: 20 March 2021 (United Kingdom)
- Running time: 105 minutes
- Country: United Kingdom
- Language: English

Creation Stories is a 2021 British biographical film about Alan McGee and Creation Records, directed by Nick Moran. The film was adapted by Irvine Welsh and Dean Cavanagh from McGee's 2013 autobiography of the same name.

Creation Stories premiered at the virtual Glasgow Film Festival on 24 February 2021, and went on general release on 20 March.

== Cast ==
- Ewen Bremner as Alan McGee
- Suki Waterhouse as Gemma
- Jason Isaacs as Ralph
- Rebecca Root as Vicky
- Joanna Pickering as Mary
- Thomas Turgoose as Dick Green
- Mel Raido as Ed Ball
- Danny John-Jules as Maurice
- Paul Kaye as Mitch
- Saskia Reeves as Helen
- Carl Barât as Griff
- Irvine Welsh as Titch
- Jason Flemyng as King Tuts Promoter
- Steven Berkoff as Aleister Crowley
- Nick Moran as Malcolm McLaren
- Ed Byrne as Alastair Campbell
- Alistair McGowan as Jimmy Savile
- James Frecheville as Troy

== Release ==
In June 2021, RLJE Films bought distribution rights to release Creation Stories in the United States.
