= Top Buzzer =

- Top Buzzer DVD artwork
- Created by: Johnny Vaughan; Ed Allen
- Starring: Stephen Graham; James Lance; Daniel Mays
- Country of origin: United Kingdom
- Original language: English
- No. of series: 1
- No. of episodes: 10

Production
- Running time: 22 minutes (per episode)
- Production company: Worlds End Productions

Original release
- Network: MTV
- Release: 8 October – 10 December 2004

Top Buzzer is a British sitcom written by Johnny Vaughan and Ed Allen, styled as television's first ever "dope opera". It was shown on MTV in 2004 and later repeated on Five. It revolves around two small-time cannabis dealers, Lee (Stephen Graham) and Sticky (James Lance), and their customers. Sticky fancies himself to be the next Richard Branson, while Lee aspires to be the Kriss Payne of 'Super Pot'.

The show lasted one series, containing ten episodes. It was released on DVD on 24 October 2005.

Guest stars on the show included Johnny Vaughan, Karen David, Ricky Grover, Howard Marks, Mackenzie Crook, Sean Lock, Edith Bowman, Iain Lee, Bez, Shaun Ryder, rapper Kanye West and presenter Xzibit, Tony Hawk and ex So Solid Crew member Asher D.

== Episodes ==
#	Title	Original air date
1	"Germination"	8 October 2004
2	"Little Wednesday"	15 October 2004
3	"Drought"	22 October 2004
4	"Lee's Dinner"	29 October 2004
5	"Strike"	5 November 2004
6	"Meet the Parents"	12 November 2004
7	"The Neighbours Are Away"	19 November 2004
8	"Party"	26 November 2004
9	"Either They Go..."	3 December 2004
10	"The Long Weekend"	10 December 2004
