= The Go-Between (2015 film) =

2015 British television film

- Genre: Romantic drama
- Based on: The Go-Between by L. P. Hartley
- Written by: Adrian Hodges
- Directed by: Pete Travis
- Starring: Vanessa Redgrave; Jim Broadbent; Joanna Vanderham; Jack Hollington
- Music by: Christian Henson
- Country of origin: United Kingdom
- Original language: English

Production
- Executive producers: Susan Hogg; Adrian Hodges
- Producer: Claire Bennett
- Cinematography: Felix Wiedemann
- Editor: Stuart Gazzard
- Running time: 90 minutes
- Production company: BBC

Original release
- Network: BBC One
- Release: 20 September 2015

The Go-Between is a 2015 British romantic drama television film directed by Pete Travis and written by Adrian Hodges, based on the 1953 novel of the same name by L. P. Hartley. The film stars Vanessa Redgrave, Jim Broadbent, Joanna Vanderham, and Jack Hollington, and aired on BBC One on 20 September 2015. It was filmed at Englefield House in Berkshire.

== Cast ==
- Jack Hollington, young Leo Colston
- Jim Broadbent, old Leo
- Joanna Vanderham, young Marian Maudsley
- Vanessa Redgrave, old Marian
- Ben Batt, Ted Burgess/Hugh Edward Winlove, 11th Viscount Trimingham
- Stephen Campbell Moore, Hugh Winlove, 9th Viscount Trimingham
- Lesley Manville, Madeleine Maudsley
- Samuel Joslin, Marcus Maudsley
- Jack Cutmore-Scott, Denys Maudsley
- Tim McMullan, butler
- Emily Laing, Julia
- Nicholas Evans, boy treble

== Plot summary ==
Leo, an elderly man, is travelling back to the place where he spent the summer of 1900 as the guest of a much wealthier school friend, Marcus Maudsley. On his journey he recalls the events surrounding his original visit, during which he had celebrated his thirteenth birthday and also become besotted with his friend’s older sister Marian, whose family strongly hoped that she would marry the local landowner, Viscount Trimingham.

During Leo’s stay, Marcus had become unwell and, with nothing else to do, Leo had been persuaded to carry secret messages between Marian and a local tenant farmer, Ted Burgess. Initially unaware of the implication of their messages, Leo started to realise their significance shortly before becoming caught up in a sequence of events that he could not control, and barely comprehended at the time. As an older man, everything that happened that summer – the memories of which he has suppressed ever since – become clearer. At the end of his journey, the older Leo sees both Marian and her estranged grandson; Marian persuades him to act as a go-between one last time.

== Critical reception ==
Reviewing The Go-Between for UK daily newspaper The Daily Telegraph, Jasper Rees gave the adaptation five stars out of five, writing: "Where the BBC’s fresh take on Lady Chatterley’s Lover hollowed out the original and injected its own up-to-date agitprop, The Go-Between (BBC One) kept faith with LP Hartley’s devastating story of love denied. This was what creative fidelity is meant to look like". He added that, "Pete Travis’s roving camerawork revealed the gilded paradise of Brandon Hall [sic - Brandham Hall] in impressionistic glances and lush screen grabs of floating pollen and wafting corn. As for the protagonists, he shot Joanna Vanderham’s Marian as a radiant extension of the sun, while Ben Batt’s Ted suggested a gritty compound of gnarled oak and loamy earth". Rees singled out Jack Hollington for especial praise, "as smitten young Leo, whose trusting eyes caught brief confused glimpses of his coming expulsion from Eden. This was a superbly intuitive performance from a child actor bearing a heavy burden. Hollington held his ground throughout, with Vanderham’s manipulative Marian and Batt’s taciturn Ted (both excellent), and even when Lesley Manville as Marian’s tightly wound mother tried to worm the shattering truth out of him. In the key scenes he sang like Ernest Lough and took his cricket catch like Ben Stokes". He concluded that, "Intensified by Christian Henson’s swooning soundtrack, this was a deeply moving reverie about a life sacrificed not in the mud of Flanders but on the sun-baked lawns of Norfolk".

Writing in The Guardian, Sam Wollaston preferred the BBC’s adaptation over Downton Abbey, broadcast at the same time on a rival channel, calling it "a more edifying experience". He added, "Sensitively adapted (as all these Sunday-night BBC dramas have been so far) from LP Hartley by Adrian Hodges, it has a/the novel’s intensity, subtlety and complexity of character and theme (innocence, betrayal, the past and what it does to someone). And its direction and satisfactory arc – it knows where it’s going and it’s a bloody good story". Wollaston also noticed Hollington’s portrayal, giving him a "a special shout-out […] not just for his convincing performance as young Leo but also for being a totally convincing young Jim Broadbent (old Leo)", which he also extended "to Ben Batt (Ted Burgess) for the best topless scything since Poldark. Not too Downton (Abbey – shabby) from Joanna Vanderham as Marian either". He concluded his comparison saying, "Maybe it’s silly to compare, they’re different things, but this is Veuve Clicquot, to Downton’s Babycham".

In Radio Times, Ben Dowell found it to be, "as slow and languid as the long hot summer that young Leo spent with his wealthy school friend Denys [sic]". He added, "There was an abiding, oppressive sense of doom, with talk of distant duels in the family’s history and beautiful incidental music that complemented and deepened the sense of tragedy, realised most awfully at the end in Burgess' suicide when the heavens literally opened. This was sumptuous, involving, unforgettable drama that stayed with you. If only it hadn't been forced to compete with Downton".
