= Pythonesque (play) =

Play written by Roy Smiles

- Written by: Roy Smiles
- Subject: Graham Chapman's battle with alcoholism and death from cancer

Premiere
- Date premiered: 2008
- Place premiered: South Africa

Pythonesque is a Monty Python-related play by the British playwright Roy Smiles. It is based on Python member Graham Chapman's battle with alcoholism and his death from cancer. It continues with his rise in comedy and his getting the lead in Monty Python and the Holy Grail (1975) and Monty Python's Life of Brian (1979).

It was first performed in South Africa in 2008 and made its British debut at the 2009 Edinburgh Fringe Festival where it starred Matt Addis as Terry Jones and Michael Palin, James Lance as Terry Gilliam and Eric Idle, Mark Oosterveen as John Cleese, and Chris Polick as Graham Chapman.

It was later adapted for BBC Radio 4 with the same cast and broadcast as the Afternoon Play, in September 2010.
