= The Jump (1998 TV series) =

- Genre: Crime drama
- Created by: Martina Cole
- Written by: Adrian Hodges
- Directed by: Richard Standeven
- Starring: Adrian Dunbar; Jonathan Cake; Susan Vidler; John Light; Sue Johnston; Michael Angelis; Peter Birrel
- Composer: Ray Russell
- Country of origin: United Kingdom
- Original language: English
- No. of series: 1
- No. of episodes: 4

Production
- Executive producer: Lavinia Warner
- Producer: Margaret Mitchell
- Cinematography: John Daly
- Editor: Richard Milward
- Running time: 60 minutes
- Production companies: Warner Sisters Productions; Central Television

Original release
- Network: ITV
- Release: 6 September – 27 September 1998

The Jump is a four-part British television crime drama, written by Adrian Hodges and adapted from the 1995 novel by Martina Cole, that first broadcast on ITV on 6 September 1998. The series stars Adrian Dunbar as Alan Cox, an ex-con who offers to help Mafia wife Donna Brunos (Susan Vidler) to spring her husband George (Jonathan Cake) from prison after he is put behind bars for a brutal armed robbery.

John Light, Sue Johnston, Michael Angelis and Peter Birrel also star in principal roles. The Jump was first released on VHS on 26 January 2000, before being Region 2 DVD in the United Kingdom on 13 March 2006 via Network, in a double pack with the television adaptation of Cole's novel Dangerous Lady.

== Cast ==
- Adrian Dunbar as Alan Cox
- Jonathan Cake as George Brunos
- Susan Vidler as Donna Brunos
- John Light as Mario Brunos
- Sue Johnston as Maeve Brunos
- Michael Angelis as Donald Lewis
- Peter Birrel as Pa Brunos
- Siobhan Burke as Carol Jackson
- Julian Kerridge as Sadie Gold
- Billy McColl as Ricky Brett
- Anjela Lauren Smith as Vida Dawson
- Danny Webb as Davey Jackson
- Andy Serkis as Steven Brunos
- Mark Benton as Timmy Lambert
- Jimmy Flint as Johnnie H.
- Peter Gowen as Paddy Donovan
- Frank Harper as Anthony Calder

== Episodes ==
No.	Title	Directed by	Written by	Original release date	UK viewers (millions)
1	"Episode 1"	Richard Standeven	Adrian Hodges	6 September 1998	8.60
2	"Episode 2"	Richard Standeven	Adrian Hodges	13 September 1998	7.67
3	"Episode 3"	Richard Standeven	Adrian Hodges	20 September 1998	8.27
4	"Episode 4"	Richard Standeven	Adrian Hodges	27 September 1998	9.07
