= Tim Pigott-Smith =

British actor and author (1946–2017)

Tim Pigott-Smith OBE
- Pigott-Smith portraying the eponymous character in King Charles III (2017)
- Born: Timothy Peter Pigott-Smith; 13 May 1946; Rugby, Warwickshire, England
- Died: 7 April 2017 (aged 70); Northampton, England
- Resting place: Highgate Cemetery, London, England
- Education: Bristol Old Vic Theatre School
- Occupation: Actor
- Years active: 1971–2017
- Spouse: Pamela Miles (m. 1972)
- Children: Tom Pigott-Smith (son)
- Awards: BAFTA TV Award; Best Actor; 1985 The Jewel in the Crown

Timothy Peter Pigott-Smith OBE (13 May 1946 – 7 April 2017) was a British actor and author. For his leading role as Ronald Merrick in the television drama series The Jewel in the Crown, he won the British Academy Television Award for Best Actor in 1985. Other television roles included appearance in The Chief, Midsomer Murders, The Vice, The Suspicions of Mr Whicher, King Charles III and two Doctor Who stories (The Claws of Axos (1971) and The Masque of Mandragora (1976). Pigott-Smith appeared in films including Clash of the Titans (1981), Gangs of New York (2002), Johnny English (2003), Alexander (2004), V for Vendetta (2005), Quantum of Solace (2008), Red 2 (2013) and Jupiter Ascending (2015).

== Early life ==
Pigott-Smith was born in Rugby, Warwickshire, the son of Margaret Muriel (née Goodman) and Harry Thomas Pigott-Smith, who was a journalist. He was educated at Wyggeston Boys' School, Leicester, King Edward VI School, Stratford-upon-Avon, and Bristol University. He trained as an actor at the Bristol Old Vic Theatre School.

== Career ==
=== Film and television ===
After a long career in smaller roles, Pigott-Smith's appearance as Arthur Llewellyn Davies in the BBC's docudrama The Lost Boys led to his gaining his big break with the leading role of Ronald Merrick in the 1984 television serial The Jewel in the Crown. Other appearances include the title role in the crime drama series The Chief (1990–93), a recurring role in ITV drama The Vice as Ken Stott's nemesis Vickers, and Bloody Sunday. He appeared in two adaptations of Elizabeth Gaskell's North and South; in the 1975 version he played Frederick Hale, and in 2004 he played Frederick's father Richard. In 1995, he starred in a serial of the series Ghosts.

Pigott-Smith appeared twice in Doctor Who: in the stories The Claws of Axos (1971) and The Masque of Mandragora (1976).

Pigott-Smith was a regular narrator of documentary television series. He narrated The Team: A Season with McLaren, a six-episode BBC series about the 1993 season with McLaren Racing. He also narrated the Battlefield series, which examines pivotal battles of the Second World War from an operations point of view. Later, he narrated a series on the British Royal Family, entitled Monarchy: The Royal Family at Work. The series followed Queen Elizabeth II for more than a year, including the 2007 state visit to the United States.

From 2011 to 2014, he portrayed Commissioner Mayne in the ITV drama series The Suspicions of Mr Whicher, written by Helen Edmundson.

Pigott-Smith appeared in Lewis in 2015 as a taxidermist in the episode "One For Sorrow". He also appeared on the ITV series, Downton Abbey in the third series' (third season) fifth episode as obstetrician/gynaecologist Sir Philip Tapsell, who was present at the death of Lady Sybil Branson (Jessica Brown Findlay) from eclampsia after giving birth to her daughter.

His film career included the 2004 film Alexander, The Four Feathers, Clash of the Titans, Gangs of New York, Johnny English, The Remains of the Day and V for Vendetta. He also appeared as Major General Robert Ford in director Paul Greengrass's Bloody Sunday (2002), and as the Foreign Secretary in the James Bond film Quantum of Solace (2008). In February 2010 Pigott-Smith played Alan Keen in the television film On Expenses. He also had a cameo appearance as Sniggs in the BBC production of Evelyn Waugh's Decline and Fall in 2017. His final film role was that of Sir Henry Ponsonby, Queen Victoria's Private Secretary, in Victoria & Abdul (2017).

=== Stage and radio ===
Pigott-Smith worked in the theatre in Shakespearean and Greek roles, including Posthumus in John Barton's 1974 production of Cymbeline for the Royal Shakespeare Company. In early stage roles he was credited as "Tim Smith". He produced and appeared in Saki: a celebration at the National Theatre, with Dirk Bogarde, Barbara Leigh-Hunt and Zoë Wanamaker, later issued as an audio book.

In 2011 he took the title role in King Lear at the West Yorkshire Playhouse, Leeds.

Contemporary works included Enron, playing Ken Lay, for the Chichester Festival Theatre, and then London, in 2009 and Tobias in A Delicate Balance at the Almeida Theatre, London in 2011. He returned to the Almeida in 2014 as a post-accession Charles, Prince of Wales in King Charles III, for which he received a nomination for the Olivier Award for Best Actor, and his first Tony Award nomination for its production on Broadway in 2015. He also appeared as Charles in the 2017 film adaptation of the play.

Pigott-Smith was also a radio actor, appearing in many productions on BBC Radio 4.

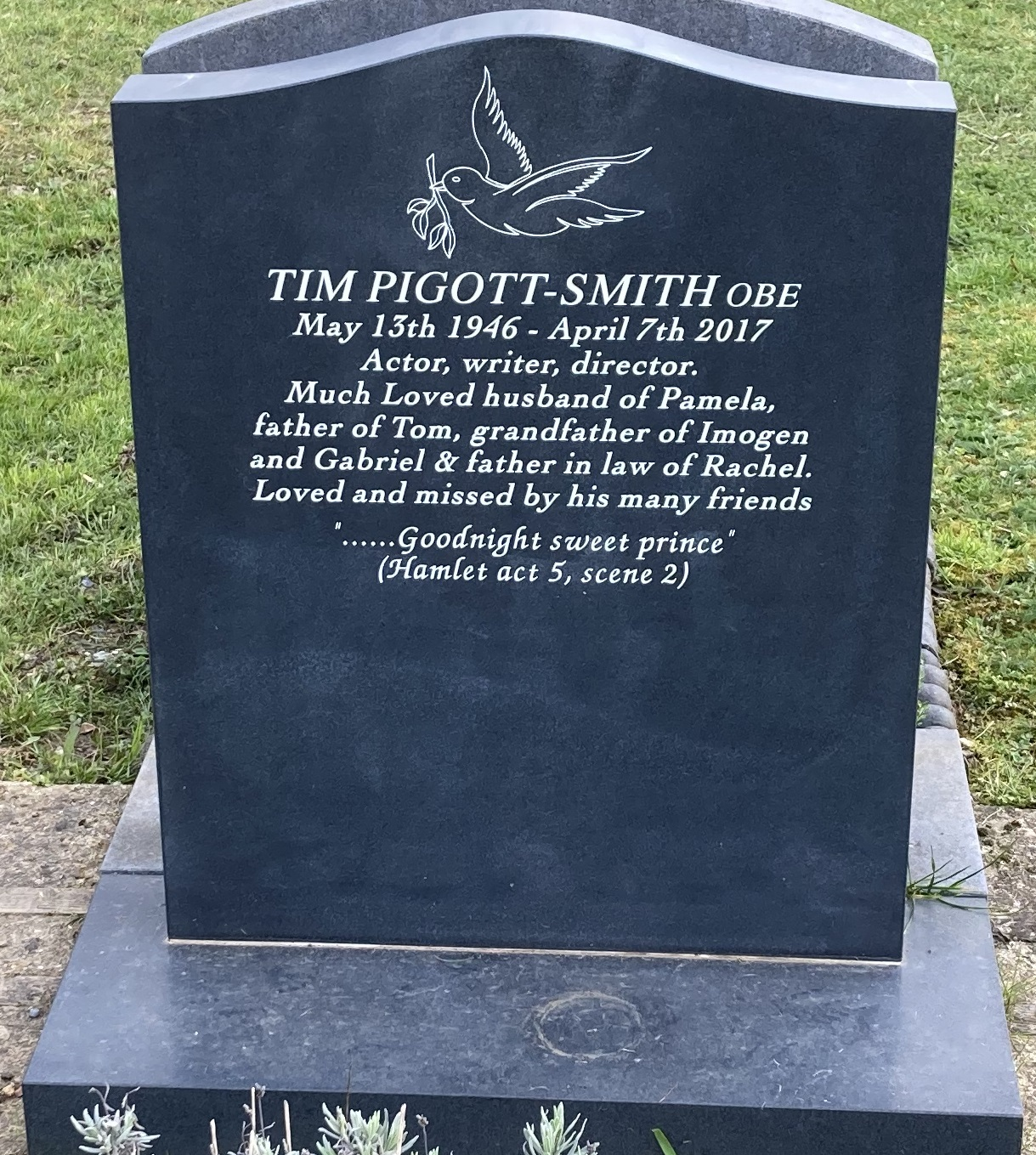
Grave of Tim Pigott-Smith in Highgate Cemetery (east side)

=== Writing ===
During the making of The Jewel in the Crown, Pigott-Smith wrote a diary on his impressions of India. This was published together with an anthology of poetry and prose under the title Out of India.

Pigott-Smith wrote two children's books in the series The Baker Street Mysteries, featuring the exploits of Sherlock Holmes' Baker Street Irregulars – The Dragon Tattoo (2008) and Shadow of Evil (2009). He played Holmes in a BBC Radio adaptation of The Valley of Fear.

== Death ==
Pigott-Smith died on 7 April 2017 at age 70 from a heart attack in Northampton, where he had been preparing to appear in a touring production of Death of a Salesman that was set to begin three days later. His wife Pamela Miles was also originally scheduled to appear in the play but had withdrawn after breaking a bone and needing surgery. He is buried on the east side of Highgate Cemetery.

== Filmography and more ==
=== Film ===
Year	Title	Role	Director(s)	Notes
1976	Aces High	Major Stoppard	Jack Gold	
1977	Joseph Andrews	Cornet	Tony Richardson	
1980	Sweet William	Gerald	Claude Whatham	
1980	Richard's Things	Peter	Anthony Harvey	
1981	Clash of the Titans	Thallo	Desmond Davis	
1981	Escape to Victory	Major Rose	John Huston	
1986	A State of Emergency	Father Joe Ryan	Richard C. Bennett	
1993	The Remains of the Day	Thomas Benn	James Ivory	
2000	Innocents	James Wisheart	Peter Kosminsky	
2002	Safe Conduct	Fleming	Bertrand Tavernier	
2002	Bloody Sunday	Major General Robert Ford	Paul Greengrass	
2002	The Four Feathers	General Faversham	Shekhar Kapur	
2002	Gangs of New York	Calvinist Minister	Martin Scorsese	
2003	Johnny English	Pegasus, Head of MI7	Peter Howitt	
2003	Eroica	Count Dietrichstein	Simon Cellan Jones	
2004	Alexander	Omen Reader	Oliver Stone	
2006	V for Vendetta	Peter Creedy	James McTeigue	
2006	L'Entente Cordiale	S.I. Masterson	Vincent De Brus	
2006	Flyboys	Mr. Lowry	Tony Bill	
2008	Quantum of Solace	Foreign Secretary	Marc Forster	
2010	Alice in Wonderland	Lord Ascot	Tim Burton	
2011	My Piece of the Pie	Mr. Brown	Cédric Klapisch	
2013	Red 2	Director Philips	Dean Parisot	
2015	Jupiter Ascending	Malidictes	The Wachowskis	
2016	Whisky Galore!	Woolsey	Gillies MacKinnon	
2017	6 Days	William Whitelaw	Toa Fraser	Posthumous release
2017	King Charles III	Charles III	Rupert Goold	Posthumous release
2017	Victoria & Abdul	Sir Henry Ponsonby	Stephen Frears	Posthumous release
2017	The Little Vampire 3D	Frederick	Richard Claus & Karsten Kiilerich	Posthumous release, voice (final film role)

=== Television ===
Year	Title	Role	Director(s)	Notes
1971	Doctor Who (The Claws of Axos)	Captain Harker	Michael Ferguson	Parts 3 and 4
1975	North and South	Frederick Hale	Rodney Bennett	1 episode
1976	Doctor Who (The Masque of Mandragora)	Marco	Rodney Bennett	4 episodes
1979	Measure for Measure	Angelo	Desmond Davis	BBC Shakespeare series
1979	Danger UXB	Harry Winthrop	Simon Langton	
1979	Henry IV Pt 1	Henry 'Hotspur' Percy	David Giles	BBC Shakespeare series
1980	'Tis Pity She's a Whore	Vasques	Roland Joffé	BBC
1981	Winston Churchill: The Wilderness Years	Brendan Bracken	Ferdinand Fairfax	8 episodes
1982	I Remember Nelson	Capt. Thomas Hardy		4 episodes
1984	The Jewel in the Crown	Ronald Merrick		Main cast
1986	Dead Man's Folly	Sir George Stubbs	Clive Donner	Television movie
1987	Life Story	Francis Crick	Mick Jackson	1988 BAFTA TV Award as the Best Single Drama
1990–1993	The Chief	Chief Constable John Stafford		First two series plus two episodes of series three
1993	The Team – A Season With McLaren		Narrator	1 series, 6 episodes
1994	Battlefield		Narrator	3 series
2002	Spooks	Hampton Wilder		Series 1, Episode 5: "The Rose Bed Memoirs"
2003	The Day Britain Stopped		Narrator	Dramatic pseudo-documentary television film
2004	North and South	Richard Hale		Main cast
2006	Agatha Christie's Poirot	Dr. Lionel Woodward		Series 10, Episode: "Taken at the Flood"
2007	HolbyBlue	DCI Harry Hutchinson		Series 1
2008	Midsomer Murders	Matt Parkes	Renny Rye	Episode: "Days of Misrule"
2010	Foyle's War	Brigadier Timothy Wilson	Stuart Orme	Series 6, Episode 1
2011	The Hour	Lord Elms	Coky Giedroyc, Jamie Payne	Series 1, Episodes 1, 2 and 6
2012	Downton Abbey	Sir Philip Tapsell	Jeremy Webb	Series 3, Episode 5
2011–2014	The Suspicions of Mr Whicher	Commissioner Mayne		Screenplay by Helen Edmundson
2013	Wodehouse in Exile	P.G. Wodehouse	Tim Fywell	Screenplay by Nigel Williams
2013	Silent Witness	John Briggs	Laura Mackie, Jessica Pope	Series 16, Episode 1 ("Change Pt. 1")
2013	Miranda	Valerie Jackford		Series 3, Episode 3
2014	37 Days	Herbert Henry Asquith	Justin Hardy	3-part TV drama
2015	Lewis	Jasper Hammond	Nicholas Laughland	Series 9, Episode 1 ("One For Sorrow" parts 1 and 2)

=== Audiobook narration ===
Year	Book title	Author	Release date
2000	Blue at the Mizzen	Patrick O'Brian	5 July
2000	The Fortune of War	Patrick O'Brian	5 July
2000	Desolation Island	Patrick O'Brian	5 July
2000	The Far Side of the World	Patrick O'Brian	7 November
2000	The Ionian Mission	Patrick O'Brian	5 July
2000	The Letter of Marque	Patrick O'Brian	4 July
2000	The Mauritius Command	Patrick O'Brian	5 July
2001	The Nutmeg of Consolation	Patrick O'Brian	7 August
2000	The Reverse of the Medal	Patrick O'Brian	5 July
2000	The Surgeon's Mate	Patrick O'Brian	5 July
2001	The Thirteen Gun Salute	Patrick O'Brian	5 June
2001	The Truelove	Patrick O'Brian	9 October
2002	The Wine-Dark Sea	Patrick O'Brian	22 January
2000	Treason's Harbour	Patrick O'Brian	10 October
2000	Seven Years in Tibet	Heinrich Harrer	5 July
1995	The Warlord Trilogy	Bernard Cornwell	
2000	Endurance: Shackleton's Incredible Voyage	Alfred Lansing	23 May

== Awards and honours ==
Pigott-Smith won the BAFTA Award for Best Actor in 1985, for his role in The Jewel in the Crown. In 2014–15, he was nominated for the Laurence Olivier Award and the Tony Award for his lead role in the play King Charles III. He was appointed an Officer of the Order of the British Empire (OBE) in the 2017 New Year Honours for services to drama.

=== Awards and nominations ===
Year	Award	Category	Work	Result	Ref.
1985	BAFTA TV Awards	Best Actor	The Jewel in the Crown	Won	
2002	Fantasporto Award	Directors' Week Award for Best Actor	Bloody Sunday	Won	
2010	Laurence Olivier Awards	Best Actor in a Supporting Role	Enron	Nominated	
2015	Laurence Olivier Awards	Best Actor	King Charles III	Nominated	
2018	BAFTA TV Awards	Best Actor	King Charles III	Nominated	
