= The Runaway (TV series) =

- Also known as: Martina Cole's The Runaway
- Genre: Crime drama
- Created by: Martina Cole
- Written by: Allan Cubitt
- Directed by: David Richards
- Starring: Jack O'Connell; Joanna Vanderham; Burn Gorman; Keith Allen; Kierston Wareing; Alan Cumming; Sam Spruell; Ken Stott; Mark Womack
- Composers: Ben Bartlett; Chris Letcher
- Country of origin: United Kingdom
- Original language: English
- No. of series: 1
- No. of episodes: 6

Production
- Executive producers: Martina Cole; George Faber; Helen Flint; Charles Pattinson; Elaine Pyke; Lavinia Warner
- Producer: Nick Goding
- Cinematography: Owen McPolin
- Editors: Margeaux Britz; Fiona Colbeck; Catherine Creed; Trevor Waite
- Running time: 50 minutes
- Production company: Company Pictures

Original release
- Network: Sky1
- Release: 31 March – 5 May 2011

The Runaway is a six-part British television crime drama series, adapted by Allan Cubitt from the novel by Martina Cole, that first broadcast on Sky1 on 31 March 2011. Directed by David Richards, The Runaway is set in the sleazy, gritty world of '60s and '70s London, and focuses on the doomed romance of East Londoners Cathy Connor (Joanna Vanderham) and Eamonn Docherty (Jack O'Connell). The series also co-stars Burn Gorman, Keith Allen and Kierston Wareing among others.

Principal shooting on the series took place in South Africa, which doubled up for 1960s Soho. Original music for the series was written by Chris Letcher, alongside Ben Bartlett. The Runaway was the second of Cole's novels to be adapted by Company Pictures for Sky, following on from The Take, starring Tom Hardy and Charlotte Riley, that first broadcast in 2009. The complete series of The Runaway was released on DVD via ITV Studios on 9 May 2011.

== Reception ==
Patrick Smith of The Telegraph said of the first episode; "Martina Cole's crime novels aren't for the faint-hearted: they are gritty, lurid and relentlessly brutal. It's no surprise, then, that the opening episode of The Runaway made for uncomfortable viewing. Although one moment captured this transformation perfectly, the rest of the episode wasn’t nearly as gripping. The central storyline was hackneyed, while Keith Allen, sporting a horrendous wig, sounded – irritatingly – as if he was channelling Danny Dyer. I was a little disappointed with Jack O'Connell, too. He wasn't bad. It's just that, having watched him play Cook in Skins with such élan, I was expecting a tour de force."

Metro published a slightly more positive review, writing: "Despite the Lock Stock clichés that lurked at every turn, The Runaway had me running with it. Opening with a knockout boxing scene straight out of Raging Bull, The Runaway had a sweaty, salty tang about it, an intensity that overcame the fact it staggered about, drunk on its own testosterone."

== Plot ==
While unrelated by blood, Cathy Connor and Eamonn Docherty live as brother and sister growing up and embark on a secret relationship. The couple are torn apart when Cathy is sent into care, but she manages to escape and finds her way onto the streets of Soho. Befriended by colourful transvestite Desrae, Cathy grows up in the heart of London's underworld, while Eamonn is drawn into a life of crime and ultimately flees to New York. The pair are finally drawn back together in the midst of the nation's impending future, but their future is far from safe.

== Cast ==
- Jack O'Connell as Eamonn Docherty Jnr.
- Joanna Vanderham as Cathy Connor
- Burn Gorman as Richard Gates
- Keith Allen as Danny Dixon
- Kierston Wareing as Madge
- Alan Cumming as Desrae
- Sam Spruell as Jim Harvey
- Ken Stott as Joey Pasqualino
- Mark Womack as Eamonn Docherty Snr.
- Nora-Jane Noone as Caitlin
- Max Irons as Tommy Pasqualino
- Emily Beecham as Caroline Dixon
- Dominika Jablonska as Maureen
- Grant Swanby as Sean Carty
- David Westhead as Ron Carver

== Episodes ==
No.	Title	Directed by	Written by	Original release date	UK viewers (millions)
1	"Episode 1"	David Richards	Allan Cubitt	31 March 2011	0.86
Cathy Connor and Eamonn Docherty are childhood sweethearts who are desperate to escape their East End roots. When Cathy murders her Mum's pimp in self-defense it changes their lives forever.
2	"Episode 2"	David Richards	Allan Cubitt	7 April 2011	0.86
Cathy and Eamonn struggle with their enforced separation. Whilst Eamonn plays a dangerous game by undermining his boss, Cathy finds herself in an oppressive reform school. When Cathy is abused, she runs away and ends up in Soho.
3	"Episode 3"	David Richards	Allan Cubitt	14 April 2011	0.86
With Desrae's help, Cathy reinvents herself in Soho. Cathy and Eamonn are reunited but it ends in disaster and Eamonn is forced to flee the country.
4	"Episode 4"	David Richards	Allan Cubitt	21 April 2011	0.81
Eamonn and Cathy rekindle their romance but when Eamonn is forced to return to America, a pregnant Cathy seduces Tommy and they get married.
5	"Episode 5"	David Richards	Tom Grieves	28 April 2011	0.78
Cathy and Tommy's marriage is on the rocks which is further exacerbated when Eamonn returns to London. When Tommy's drug deal goes wrong, Kitty's life is left hanging in the balance.
6	"Episode 6"	David Richards	Allan Cubitt	5 May 2011	0.77
Eamonn plays a dangerous game by informing on the IRA to Special Branch. He and Cathy are desperate to get away and start a new life together but will they make it without being caught?
