= Jacqui Rose =

British novelist

Jacqui Rose is a British crime fiction novelist, and as J. P. Rose, a children's author.

== Life ==
Rose was born in Manchester, of Jamaican, Nigerian and Anglo-Irish ancestry. She was adopted as a child, grew up in a Yorkshire village, and trained as an actor, before running prison writing workshops, and then crime fiction.

== Writing ==
Rose has written 14 gangland crime thrillers.

She has collaborated with Martina Cole to co-author Loyalty, which was published in 2023.

Writing as J. P. Rose, her first children's book, The Haunting of Tyrese Walker was published by Andersen Press in 2023, and was shortlisted for the Branford Boase Award.

In 2024, Andersen Press published Birdie, her second book for children. The semi-autobiographical story is set in 1952 in Yorkshire and depicts the life of a "brown baby" who, after being abandoned by her mother, grows up in an orphanage until, at age nine, she is taken in by her great aunt and great uncle. At her new village school and among her neighbors she experiences racism for the first time. The German translation was selected in October 2025 as children's book of the month ('Luchs of the month') by a jury associated with the national weekly paper Die Zeit. Birdie was shortlisted for the 2026 Carnegie Medal for Writing.

In 2024, Rose was a judge for the Jhalak Prize.

== Bibliography ==
=== As Jacqui Rose ===
- Taken (2012)
- Trapped (2013)
- Dishonour (2013)
- Betrayed (2014)
- Avenged (2014)
- Disobey (2015)
- Toxic (2018)
- Fatal (2019)
- Sinner (2019)
- Poison (2020)
- Rival (2020)
- The Streets (2022)
- The Women (2023)

=== with Martina Cole ===
- Loyalty (2023)
- Guilty (2024)

=== As J P Rose ===
- The Haunting of Tyrese Walker, 2023, Andersen Press
- Birdie, 2024, Andersen Press
