= Kurt and Sid =

2009 play by Roy Smiles

- Cover of script
- Original language: English
- Written by: Roy Smiles
- Characters: Sid Vicious, Kurt Cobain
- Genre: Drama

Kurt and Sid is a play by Roy Smiles which had its world premiere at the Trafalgar Studios in London's West End. The play opened on 9 September 2009 and starred Danny Dyer (as Sid Vicious) and Shaun Evans (as Kurt Cobain). Kurt and Sid was directed by Tim Stark, developed by B29 Productions and produced by Thomas Hopkins and Andrew Jenkins. The play ran until 3 October 2009.

== Development ==
Sid Vicious was only portrayed in the 1986 film Sid and Nancy previously. Although Kurt Cobain had never previously been portrayed in film or stage, a character based on Cobain, named Blake, appeared in the 2005 film Last Days. Danny Dyer first became interested in having a role when Tim Stark the director told him about it 6 years before the play opened. Shaun Evans grew out his hair for the role of Kurt Cobain and dyed his hair blond. Dyer thought that it would be interesting to see how the audience reacts because of the play being both dark and light.

== Plot ==
Kurt decides to commit suicide, but Sid stops him. Sid may have come back from the dead to save someone after killing Nancy Spungen. Sid and Kurt discuss what it is like to be famous and their problems. "Kurt and Sid" uses the imagined interaction between these two rock legends to explore deeper issues related to the music industry and personal turmoil. The play is a fictional narrative where Kurt, struggling with his own demons, encounters the ghost of Sid Vicious. This meeting allows for a dialogue between two legendary figures who never met in real life but shared similar struggles with fame, addiction, and mental health. Nancy Spungen's indirect presence highlights the interconnectedness of these themes, as her story is emblematic of the darker side of rock culture that also affected Kurt. While Nancy Spungen does not directly appear in "Kurt and Sid," her influence is felt through the character of Sid Vicious. Her tumultuous relationship with Sid and her tragic death are part of the backdrop that shaped Sid's life and legacy. In discussions about Sid Vicious, Nancy often comes up as a significant figure due to their intense and destructive relationship. Sid tries to convince Kurt that he should not take his life. The play takes place in Kurt's greenhouse.

== Reception ==
Charles Spencer in The Daily Telegraph gave the play four stars: "Roy Smiles has created a cracking play about Kurt Cobain and Sid Vicious in Kurt and Sid". He added, "There are two startling achievements in Kurt & Sid. Smiles turns the sad and wasteful story of Cobain, a heroin addict who blew his brains out with a shotgun in 1994, into a work that is at once laugh-out-loud funny, touching and thought-provoking. Perhaps even more remarkably, he turns Sid Vicious, late of the Sex Pistols and perhaps the most worthless individual ever to emerge even from the murky world of rock music, into a highly engaging hero." The Guardian were more critical, with Lyn Gardner awarding it just 2 stars.
