= King Charles III (film) =

2017 future history television film

- Genre: Drama; Political; Thriller
- Based on: King Charles III by Mike Bartlett
- Screenplay by: Mike Bartlett
- Directed by: Rupert Goold
- Starring: Tim Pigott-Smith; Oliver Chris; Richard Goulding; Tamara Lawrance; Charlotte Riley; Margot Leicester
- Composer: Jocelyn Pook
- Country of origin: United Kingdom

Production
- Executive producers: Greg Brenman; Roanna Benn; Mike Bartlett; Rupert Goold
- Producer: Simon Maloney
- Cinematography: Philippe Kress
- Editor: Elen Pierce Lewis
- Running time: 90 minutes
- Production company: Drama Republic

Original release
- Network: BBC Two
- Release: 10 May 2017

King Charles III is a 2017 future history television film adapted by Mike Bartlett from his play of the same title. It is directed by Rupert Goold, director of the original play, and stars most of the play's original cast including Tim Pigott-Smith, who died before the film was broadcast, as Charles.

Written in blank verse and set in the future, the film focuses on the fictional reign of the real life Charles III (who at the time of the film's release was Prince of Wales) and the surrounding political drama as a result of his accession to the throne. It was broadcast on 10 May 2017 on BBC Two in the UK, before being broadcast on 14 May 2017 on PBS Masterpiece in the US. A DVD of the film was released in the UK on 15 May 2017.

The film received two nominations at the 2018 British Academy Television Awards: Best Single Drama and Best Actor for Pigott-Smith.

== Plot ==
Charles and his family gather following the funeral of the late Queen Elizabeth II. Charles, as the new king, then holds his first weekly audience with Prime Minister Tristan Evans. They discuss a new bill for statutory regulation of the press, which has passed the House of Commons and the House of Lords and awaits only Charles' royal assent to become law. Charles is concerned that the law restricts freedom of the press too much and would allow the government to censor the news and prevent legitimate uncovering of abuse of power. He asks the PM for alterations to the bill, but the PM refuses. As the two men spar, Mrs. Stevens, the Leader of the Opposition, arrives for a weekly meeting with Charles, an innovation the new king has introduced. Stevens expresses her doubts on the bill, and despite reminding the king of his level of power, she sees little alternative but for Charles to sign.

In parallel, Prince Harry has begun a relationship with Jessica (Jess) Edwards, a working-class republican who has made him reconsider his desire to remain a member of the royal family. Jess later approaches royal press adviser James Reiss about an ex-boyfriend of hers, who is threatening to leak compromising photographs of her, which she fears could damage both her and the prince's reputation. Both Charles and Prince William have seen the ghost of Princess Diana, promising each man that he will become "the greatest king of all." One of Charles' first actions is to refuse to give royal assent to the press regulation bill. The Prime Minister holds a crisis meeting with the Leader of the Opposition and then goes alone to try to convince Charles to sign, but Charles continues to refuse. Evans then threatens to pass a new law bypassing royal assent and then pass the press law. However, just prior to the vote, Charles enters the chamber and uses his power of the royal prerogative to dissolve Parliament, preventing the PM from bringing either plan into effect. Charles' actions are reluctantly supported by Douglas Rowe, the Speaker of the House of Commons, who subsequently refuses to allow Parliament to re-assemble.

Protests begin across the country, with the most violent taking place in London. In response, Charles increases the army guard at Buckingham Palace, a move which only further increases the tension between him and the British government. He then offers royal protection to Jess, whom the media have made the centre of a sex scandal after her ex-boyfriend leaked the photos to The Sun. He also agrees to Harry's wish to become a commoner so he can live a more fulfilling life with Jess. The PM, increasingly concerned with the backlash as a result of the king's actions, meets William, Prince of Wales, and Catherine, Princess of Wales, to discuss the matter. Catherine, not wanting to lose the opportunity to rule alongside William in the future, proposes a solution: William will serve as a mediator between Parliament and his father. William joins his father in a press conference, where he announces the plan without the king's knowledge or consent.

Seeing this as a betrayal, Charles reacts angrily to both his son and press adviser James Reiss. During a tense meeting with William, William angrily rebukes his father for creating disorder, as well as chastising him for his mistreatment of Diana during her lifetime and asks him to abdicate to help restore order. As Catherine and Harry await in another room in Buckingham Palace, the three deliver an ultimatum to the king, threatening to remove themselves (and their children) from his life unless he steps down. Unwilling to face the rest of his life alone, Charles reluctantly abdicates in favour of William, who plans to sign the press bill and restore the status quo between the monarchy and Parliament, in addition to quelling the public unrest.

Prior to the joint coronation at Westminster Abbey, Harry meets Jess and reluctantly informs her they can no longer be together, as their former plans would upset the status quo with the new king and his position in the public sphere. The film ends with William and Kate's coronation as king and queen consort, with Charles angrily placing the crown on his son's head in lieu of the Archbishop of Canterbury before exiting as the crowd proclaims "God Save the King".

== Cast ==
Royal family

- Tim Pigott-Smith as King Charles III
- Oliver Chris as William, Prince of Wales
- Richard Goulding as Prince Harry
- Charlotte Riley as Catherine, Princess of Wales
- Margot Leicester as Queen Camilla
- Katie Brayben as the ghost of Diana, Princess of Wales

Politicians and public figures

- Adam James as Prime Minister Tristan Evans
- Priyanga Burford as Mrs. Stevens, the Leader of the Opposition
- Ian Redford as Douglas Rowe, the Speaker of the House of Commons
- John Shrapnel as the Archbishop of Canterbury
- Rupert Vansittart as Sir Matthew, a British Army General

Others

- Tim McMullan as James Reiss, the Press Adviser to Buckingham Palace
- Tamara Lawrance as Jessica Edwards, Prince Harry's republican girlfriend
- Max Bennett as Coottsey, a friend of Harry who introduces him to Jess
- Parth Thakerar as Spencer, a friend of Harry
- Tom Mothersdale as Bob, Jess's equally republican flatmate
- Nyasha Hatendi as Paul, the owner of a takeaway restaurant

The cast features most of the original cast from the Almeida, West End and Broadway productions with the exceptions of Charlotte Riley as Kate (originally played by Lydia Wilson), Tamara Lawrance as Jess (originally played by Tafline Steen), Tim McMullan as James Reiss (originally played by Nick Sampson and later Miles Richardson) and Priyanga Burford as Mrs Stevens (originally Mr Stevens, played by Nicholas Rowe later Anthony Calf). In the original play, Nyasha Hatendi played multiple roles including Spencer, Paul and the Archbishop of Canterbury. Parth Thakerar played these roles in the subsequent UK tour.

== Reception ==
The screening of the production on the British national broadcaster was controversial. The Mail on Sunday published claims by Rosa Monckton, a close friend of Diana, Princess of Wales, that the BBC was broadcasting irresponsible rumours concerning the paternity of Prince Harry. However, Kate Maltby, writing in the Financial Times, defended the show and criticised The Mail on Sunday's "somewhat manufactured row."

The Tory MP Andrew Bridgen told The Mail on Sunday it was "unfortunate the BBC would seek to promote this flight of fantasy, which many licence-fee payers will find distasteful and which I believe denigrates and undermines our royal family." Similarly, former Conservative defence minister Sir Gerald Howarth told The Daily Telegraph: "It is extraordinarily insensitive for an organisation which is so consumed with political correctness. It is pure indulgence by the BBC to run a play featuring the demise of the sovereign and ascribing to a popular member of the Royal family [the Duchess of Cambridge] base motives."

John Whittingdale, a former Culture Secretary, publicly defended the show, writing in The Daily Telegraph: "If the BBC has commissioned a production of a decent play how can one possibly object to that? High-quality drama is at the heart of public service broadcasting...Some of my colleagues get hysterical about this kind of thing. I don't think the Queen is the least bit offended."

Following the premiere, The Daily Express, The New York Times and The Belfast Telegraph drew attention to a number of viewers' responses, including demands that Pigott-Smith be given a posthumous BAFTA.

The BBC broadcast drew a live audience of 1.8 million viewers according to overnight ratings, before it was added to the BBC's streaming catch-up service.

=== Critical reception ===
Reviewing the programme for The Daily Telegraph, Jasper Rees gave it five stars, calling it "pure televisual gelignite", adding that, "In a towering performance, Pigott-Smith, who passed away last month, suggested unendurable agonies of conscience as events stripped him of his identity". Rees concluded by saying, "Bartlett's supremely supple ear filtered the story through digestible blank verse meshing cod-Bard and street demotic. Perhaps this majestic, unmissable drama will send new audiences back to the source for meaningful encounters with Lear, Lady M, Brutus, Prince Hal and other forebears."

In The Guardian, Mark Lawson began his review by noting that, "Some newspaper coverage ahead of the BBC2 screening of King Charles III – a drama imagining a brief and catastrophic reign for the current Prince of Wales – gave the impression that ... the BBC director-general, should be held in the Tower of London awaiting execution for treason", but judged instead that "the summons he seems more likely to get is to next year's Bafta TV awards, where the BBC will surely be honoured for one of its boldest drama commissions". Lawson found that "Pigott-Smith's performance and Bartlett's script avoid any trace of the pettiness, temper and self-indulgence attributed to Charles by biographers ... 'What am I?,' Charles asks, a line that Pigott-Smith, with an agonised sigh, makes as existentially heart-wrenching as Hamlet's To be, or not to be". Lawson finished his review by acknowledging that, "King Charles III, on TV, is two different things: an outrage for those who believe the monarchy should always be reverenced, especially by the BBC, but also a drama with the highest quality of acting, writing and filming. Strangely, those versions sometimes co-exist: a paper whose front page railed against the BBC for questioning Prince Harry’s DNA gave the play a five-star preview on its TV pages on the same day."

Writing in The Stage, Stewart Pringle remarked, "Sweep away the desperate and derelict controversy that's frothed around its broadcast, and this TV adaptation of Mike Bartlett's 2014 future-history play King Charles III is a delightful anachronism – a play for today". He observed that the translation from stage to screen had resulted in "a production that cosies close to the text, and to the performers who made it sing", but also that, "there are inevitable alterations, both gains and losses, that have occurred in the translation. Many are contextual – the effect of a soliloquy delivered to an audience is startlingly different to a monologue delivered straight to camera". Pringle found the echoes of Ian Richardson's "to-camera monologues" in the To Play the King series of the House of Cards trilogy to be problematic, and also "the language and meter. What felt ingenious on stage occasionally clunks on screen, and while some of the strangeness fades as the gallop of Bartlett's story-telling takes off, it still feels hazardously close to the kind of fakespeare gimmickery that the original production side-stepped". However, he praised "the 11th hour capturing of Tim Pigott-Smith's career-best performance as the beleaguered monarch. Frailer now, or perhaps just frailer in close-up, his shifts from bewilderment to iron resolve, his half-fatherly half-vengeful stare are as powerful as anything on telly, stage or elsewhere". Pringle concluded, "It remains a cracking story, Bartlett's plotting a pure pleasure, his satire stiletto-sharp. Pigott-Smith holds the screen, utterly, as he did the stage, and Goold has done a double service in bronze-casting that performance for future generations, and building a rare and encouraging bridge between the telly-box and some of the country's best and brightest new stage writing".
