= Philip Wright (actor) =

English actor

Philip Wright is an English actor, known for playing DC Lillie in Prime Suspect and DI Steve Thompson in the BBC soap opera EastEnders.

== Personal life ==
Wright lives in South East London with his wife and children; his son is the British cyclist Fred Wright.

== Filmography ==
- Prime Suspect (1992–1993)
- Dangerous Lady (1995)
- The Bill (1996, 1997, 1999, 2002, 2006)
- The Wings Of The Dove (1997)
- Casualty (2001, 2009)
- Holby City (2005)
- Doctors (2005, 2009, 2011)
- Dalziel and Pascoe episode "Heads You Lose" (2005)
- The Flying Scotsman (2006)
- Our Girl (2013)
- Line Of Duty (2014)
- Silent Witness (2015)
- Doctor Foster (2017)
- Call the Midwife (2019)
- Casualty (2019–present)
- EastEnders (2019–2021)
- Save Me (2020)
