= A Soldier and a Maker =

A Soldier and a Maker is a piece of musical theatre written by Iain Burnside on the life story of the World War I poet and composer Ivor Gurney. It premiered in April 2012 at the Guildhall School of Music and Drama, with Richard Goulding as Gurney. The production was designed by Giuseppe and Emma Belli. It was later adapted into a radio play broadcast on BBC Radio 3 on 29 June 2014 as part of the "Music in the Great War" season. The radio adaptation retained many of the stage cast.

== Cast ==
	April 2012	Radio 2014
Ivor Gurney	Richard Goulding	
Winifred Gurney		Stephanie Cole
Ethel Gurney	Bethan Langford	
Marion Scott		Jemma Redgrave
Herbert Howells/Reg/Ronald Gurney		David Shaw Parker
Taylor		Nick Allen
Rose/Radio Girl		Holly Marie Bingham
Snowy/Dr		Alexander Cobb
Billy		Dominick Felix
Nurse Wallace		Katie Grosset
Wilf		Frazer Scott
Tug/Dr Terry		Adam Sullivan
Florence/Helen/Nurse Drummond		Zoe Waites

== Reception ==
The show was praised for its book and for Goulding's performance as Gurney. There was some criticism of some of the supporting cast's acting.
