= Dangerous Lady =

- Genre: Crime drama
- Created by: Martina Cole
- Written by: Paul Hines
- Directed by: John Woods
- Starring: Sheila Hancock; Jason Isaacs; Susan Lynch; Owen Teale; Cal Macaninch; James Bowers; Philip Wright; John Thomson; Frank Grimes
- Composer: Ray Russell
- Country of origin: United Kingdom
- Original language: English
- No. of series: 1
- No. of episodes: 4

Production
- Executive producer: Lavinia Warner
- Producer: Paul Sarony
- Cinematography: John Hooper
- Editor: Colin Goudie
- Running time: 60 minutes
- Production companies: Warner Sisters Productions; Central Television

Original release
- Network: ITV
- Release: 23 May – 13 June 1995

Dangerous Lady is a four-part British drama television miniseries, which aired on ITV based on Martina Cole's 1992 novel of the same name. The series premiered in 1995 and stars Sheila Hancock, Jason Isaacs, Susan Lynch and Owen Teale. Each episode is 60 minutes and was a Warner Sisters production for the ITV network.

== Plot ==
The story of a family of West End gangsters of Irish descent in 1960s post-war London, and the secret love affair between Maura, who rises to become one of the leading gangsters of her day, and Terry Patterson, a policeman. The story opens in May 1950, with the birth of Maura Ryan. The plot covers the exploits of the Ryan family up to the mid-1980s, culminating in the death of Michael Ryan and the arrest of Maura. The saga spans 30 years and contains all the elements of a typical mobster family: Protection rackets, sleazy Soho nightclubs, gold bullion heists, violent criminals and bloody and brutal exterminations.

== Main cast ==
- Sheila Hancock as Sarah Ryan
- Jason Isaacs as Michael Ryan
- Susan Lynch as Maura Ryan
- Owen Teale as Terry Patterson
- Cal Macaninch as Geoff Ryan
- James Bowers as Roy Ryan
- Philip Wright as Garry Ryan
- John Thomson as Lee Ryan
- Frank Grimes as Benjamin Ryan
- Caroline Trowbridge as Janine

== DVD release ==
The Dangerous Lady DVD was released 26 July 2005 by the Select O Hits Video studio

== 2012 stage adaptation ==
A stage version of Dangerous Lady opened at the Theatre Royal Stratford East, London, her third to be presented at the Royal Stratford, to positive reviews. The play ran from Friday 19 October 2012 - Saturday 17 November 2012.
