= Billy McColl (actor) =

Scottish actor (1951–2014)

- Born: William Collins; 15 November 1951; Hamilton, Scotland, UK
- Died: 1 January 2014 (aged 62); London, England, UK
- Occupation: Actor
- Years active: 1978–2013
- Children: 1

William Collins (15 November 1951 – 1 January 2014), better known by his stage name Billy McColl, was a Scottish actor.

McColl was married; his marriage was ultimately dissolved. He had a daughter, Maud. He died on 1 January 2014, aged 62, in London, England.

== Filmography ==
Films and television
Year	Title	Role	Notes
1978	ITV Playhouse	Eric	Episode: Cold Harbour
1978	The One and Only Phyllis Dixey	Angus Watson	
1979	The Music Machine	Mark	
1978–1979	Play for Today	Phil McCann / John Duncan	2 Episodes; Episode: The Slab Boys; Episode: Dinner at the Sporting Club
1980	Holding the Fort	Private Dunbar	Episode: Twelve Good Men and Pooh
1980	Grandad	Dave Corby	Season 2, Episode 5
1984	Murder Not Proven	John Laurie	Season 1, Episode 2
1984	Ordeal by Innocence	Jacko Argyle	
1986	Shoot for the Sun	Johnson	
1986	Doctor Who	Humker	Episode: The Trial of a Time Lord
1989	Dream Baby	Kenny	
1991	Jute City		
1993	Soft Top Hard Shoulder	Kevin the Guru	
1994	Between the Lines	Detective Superintendent Mike Perren	Season 3, Episode 8
1995	99-1	Dyer	Season 2, Episode 8
1995	Hamish Macbeth	Francie McGlip	Season 1, Episode 5
1996	Pie in the Sky	Minder	Season 3, Episode 4
1994–1996	The Bill	Chris McReady / Gavin Jackson	Season 10, Episode 92; Season 12, Episode 91
1998	Looking After Jo Jo	Billy	
1998	Oktober	Billy	Season 1, Episode 3 Season 1, Episode 2
1998	The Jump	Ricky Brett	4 Episodes
1998	Picking up the Pieces	Jimmy Parr	Season 1, Episode 4
