= Crime (novel) =

2008 novel

- Author: Irvine Welsh
- Language: Scots
- Genre: Crime novel
- Publisher: Jonathan Cape
- Publication date: 2008
- Publication place: Scotland
- Media type: Print (Hardback and paperback)
- Pages: 352 pp
- ISBN: 0-224-08053-9
- Preceded by: Filth

Crime is a 2008 novel by Scottish writer Irvine Welsh. It is the sequel to his earlier novel, Filth.

== Plot summary ==
Ray Lennox is a Detective Inspector with the Lothian and Borders Police who attempts to recover from a mental breakdown induced by stress, cocaine and alcohol abuse and a child murder case in Edinburgh in which he was the lead investigating officer by taking a holiday in Florida with his fiancée, Trudi. The pair meet up with Eddie 'Ginger' Rodgers, one of Lennox's retired former colleagues, and his wife Delores, and they all drink into the early hours of the morning.

The next morning, Lennox finds himself craving more alcohol and goes to a bar with Trudi where they have an argument, which causes Trudi to angrily leave the bar. Lennox continues drinking heavily. Soon afterwards, he meets two women, Starry and Robyn, in a different bar and they all go back to Robyn's flat, where they drink more alcohol and take cocaine. They are soon joined by two men, Lance Dearing and Johnnie, and a fight breaks out a short time later when Lennox sees Johnnie is sexually assaulting Tianna, Robyn's ten-year-old daughter. Lennox incapacitates Johnnie and struggles with Dearing, who ultimately leaves the flat with everyone except Lennox and Tianna, who have locked themselves in a bathroom.

The next morning, Lennox wakes in the bathroom and receives a telephone call from Robyn, who urges him to take Tianna to a man called Chet Lewis in Bologna before the call is interrupted by Dearing, who tries unsuccessfully to pacify Lennox. Lennox instead leaves the apartment with Tianna and travels to a local police station, where he is shocked to find Dearing is in police uniform and is working at the reception desk. Lennox flees with Tianna and hires a car to take her to Chet as Robyn instructed.

Lennox takes her across the state to an exclusive marina where he walks right into a hornets' nest of paedophiles, just like the one that had haunted him on a similar case in Edinburgh.

== Reviews ==
- Michael Wood. "The Not-So-Good Cop". The New York Review of Books.

== TV adaptation ==
On 23 July 2020, BritBox announced that Irvine Welsh would be adapting Crime as a six-part miniseries for streaming service. The 6-episode series co-written by Welsh and Dean Cavanagh and starring Dougray Scott as Ray Lennox premiered on BritBox on 18 November 2021.
