= Sam's Game (TV series) =

- Genre: Sitcom
- Starring: Davina McCall; Ed Byrne; Tristan Gemmill; Tameka Empson; Shaun Evans
- Ending theme: "As Good As It Gets" by Gene
- Country of origin: United Kingdom
- Original language: English
- No. of series: 1
- No. of episodes: 6

Production
- Running time: 30 minutes

Original release
- Network: ITV
- Release: 14 May – 18 June 2001

Sam's Game is a British television sitcom starring TV presenter Davina McCall and comedian Ed Byrne.

It also featured some actors from well-known TV dramas: Tameka Empson of EastEnders, Shaun Evans of Endeavour and Tristan Gemmill of Coronation Street.

== Cast ==
- Davina McCall as Sam
- Ed Byrne as Alex
- Shaun Evans as Tom
- Tameka Empson as Marcia
- Tristan Gemmill as Phil

== Episodes ==
No.	Title	Directed by	Written by	Original release date
1	"Bed"	Tristram Shapeero	Paul Waite	14 May 2001
2	"Eternal Rectangle"	Tristram Shapeero	Paul Waite	21 May 2001
3	"Mumma's"	Tristram Shapeero	Paul Waite	28 May 2001
4	"Dumped"	Tristram Shapeero	Paul Waite	4 June 2001
5	"Slogan"	Tristram Shapeero	Paul Waite	11 June 2001
6	"No Sweat"	Tristram Shapeero	Paul Waite	18 June 2001

== Reception ==
The show debuted poorly in the ratings. The show was widely panned by critics.
