= Jill Belch =

Scottish professor of vascular medicine (born 1954)

Jill Janette Freda Belch CBE FRSE (born 22 October 1954) is a Scottish academic working in the field of vascular medicine.

== Biography ==
Belch was born in Glasgow on 22 October 1954 to Janetta Finnie Murdoch and Alexander Ross Belch. She studied medicine at the University of Glasgow, graduating with a MB ChB in 1976 and an MD in 1987, winning the Belahouston Gold Medal. From 1982 to 1987, she was a lecturer for the Arthritis and Rheumatism Council. She was a lecturer at the University of Dundee from 1987 to 1992 and a Reader from 1992 to 1995, becoming a professor of vascular medicine in 1995. She held honorary consultant status at the University Department of Medicine of Ninewells Hospital.

She has been director of the Tayside Clinical Trials Centre and of the Tayside Medical Science Centre.

Her primary area of interest in research is inflammatory elements of vascular disease.

Belch was a founder fellow of the Academy of Medical Sciences and became a fellow of the Royal Society of Edinburgh. In 2016, she was named an Officer in the Order of the British Empire for her work in medicine.

She is the mother of actress Joanna Vanderham.

In 2022, Belch received Saltire Society's award of Outstanding Woman of Scotland.
