= King Charles III (play) =

2014 play by Mike Bartlett

- Artwork for the original London and Broadway productions.
- Written by: Mike Bartlett
- Genre: Drama; Future history
- Setting: London, United Kingdom in a future of an alternative universe

Premiere
- Date: 10 April 2014
- Place: Almeida Theatre, London

King Charles III is a 2014 play in blank verse by Mike Bartlett that premiered at the Almeida Theatre in London. The play is a future history account of the accession and reign of King Charles III of the United Kingdom (who was then still Prince of Wales), and the limiting of the freedom of the press after the News International phone hacking scandal.

A 90-minute television adaptation was broadcast on BBC Two on 10 May 2017.

== Production history ==
The play had its world premiere at the Almeida Theatre from 10 April to 31 May 2014, with previews from 3 April, directed by Rupert Goold. Charles was played by Tim Pigott-Smith, whilst the cast also included Margot Leicester as Camilla, Oliver Chris as Prince William, Lydia Wilson as Catherine, Richard Goulding as Prince Harry, Adam James as the prime minister and Nicholas Rowe as the leader of the Opposition. The production transferred to the West End's Wyndham's Theatre in September 2014 for an initial three-month run, later announcing an extension to the end of January 2015. When Pigott-Smith sustained a broken collar bone, he was replaced for five weeks by Miles Richardson.

Following its West End run, the play began a UK tour at the Birmingham Repertory Theatre with Robert Powell in the role of Charles in September 2015, ending with a month run by the Sydney Theatre Company (at the Roslyn Packer Theatre) making its Australian premiere in March 2016.

The play transferred to Broadway for a limited engagement with the original London cast, running at the Music Box Theatre from 1 November 2015 until 31 January 2016, following previews from 10 October 2015.

A typical performance ran for two hours and forty-five minutes, including one interval.

A newly mounted production of the play directed by David Muse with Robert Joy as Charles began 7 February 2017 at the Shakespeare Theatre Company in Washington D.C.

A production of the play by the UCL Drama Society, directed by Josh Moore, with services provided by UCL Stage Crew, was performed at the Bloomsbury Theatre on 17–19 November 2022, shortly after real-life Charles' accession to the throne.

== Cast ==
Role	Almeida Theatre	West End	Broadway	UK Tour	Sydney	Television Film
Role	2014		2015		2016	2017
Charles	Tim Pigott-Smith	Tim Pigott-Smith	Tim Pigott-Smith	Robert Powell	Robert Powell	Tim Pigott-Smith
William	Oliver Chris	Oliver Chris	Oliver Chris	Ben Righton	Ben Righton	Oliver Chris
Harry	Richard Goulding	Richard Goulding	Richard Goulding	Richard Glaves	Richard Glaves	Richard Goulding
Catherine	Lydia Wilson	Lydia Wilson	Lydia Wilson	Jennifer Bryden	Jennifer Bryden	Charlotte Riley
Camilla	Margot Leicester	Margot Leicester	Margot Leicester	Penelope Beaumont	Carolyn Pickles	Margot Leicester
Jess Edwards	Tafline Steen	Tafline Steen	Tafline Steen	Lucy Phelps	Lucy Phelps	Tamara Lawrance
James Reiss	Nick Sampson	Miles Richardson	Miles Richardson	Dominic Jephcott	Dominic Jephcott	Tim McMullan
Prime Minister Tristram Evans	Adam James	Adam James	Adam James	Tim Treloar	Tim Treloar	Adam James
Mark Stevens (play)/Mrs Stevens (film), Leader of the Opposition	Nicholas Rowe	Nicholas Rowe	Anthony Calf	Giles Taylor	Giles Taylor	Priyanga Burford
Sarah / Ghost / TV Producer	Katie Brayben	Katie Brayben	Sally Scott	Beatrice Walker	Beatrice Walker	Katie Brayben
Coottsey / Speaker of the House of Commons / Sir Michael	Tom Robertson	Tom Robertson	Tom Robertson	Paul Westwood	Paul Westwood	Max Bennett / Ian Redford / Rupert Vansittart
Spencer / Nick / Sir Gordon	Nyasha Hatendi	Nyasha Hatendi	Nyasha Hatendi	Parth Thakerar	Geoffrey Lumb	Parth Thakerar / Tom Mothersdale / Nyasha Hatendi
Protesters / Attendants / Understudies	Edward Elgood, Joe Eyre, Elinor Lawless, Peter Collis, Emily Swain		Lucas Hall, Rachel Spencer Hewitt, Peter Bradbury, Gordana Rashovich, Harry Smith	Emily Swain, Emily-Celine Thompson, Ryan Whittle, Karl Wilson		

== Plot ==
Charles and his family gather following the funeral of Queen Elizabeth II. Charles, as the new king, then holds his first weekly audience with the prime minister. They discuss a new bill for statutory regulation of the press, which has passed the House of Commons and the House of Lords and awaits only Charles' royal assent to become law. Charles is concerned that the law restricts freedom of the press too much, and would allow governments to censor the news and prevent legitimate uncovering of abuse of power by the government. He asks the prime minister for alterations to the bill, but the prime minister refuses. The two men spar, as the leader of the Opposition arrives for a weekly meeting with Charles, an innovation the new king has introduced. The leader of the Opposition expresses his own doubts on the bill, but he sees little alternative but for Charles to sign.

In parallel, Prince Harry has begun a relationship with Jess Edwards, a republican. Both Charles and Prince William have seen the ghost of Diana, Princess of Wales, promising each man that he will become "the greatest king of all". One of his first actions is to refuse to give royal assent to the press regulation bill. The prime minister holds a crisis meeting with the leader of the Opposition and then goes alone to try to convince Charles to sign, but Charles continues to refuse. The prime minister then threatens to pass a new law bypassing the royal assent and then pass the press law, but Charles then dissolves Parliament before the prime minister can bring either of these plans into effect.

Protests begin across the country and especially in London. Charles increases the army guard at Buckingham Palace, offers his protection to Jess (whom the press have made the centre of a sex scandal), and agrees to Harry's wish to become a commoner. The duchess of Cambridge (Prince William's wife Catherine) proposes a solution: William will serve as a mediator between Parliament and his father. William announces this plan at a press conference without his father's knowledge or consent. Seeing this as a betrayal, Charles reacts angrily. Ultimately, Charles is forced to abdicate in favour of William, who plans to sign the press bill and restore the status quo between king and Parliament. The play concludes with Harry's rejection of Jess, and William and Catherine's coronation as king and queen consort.

== Critical reception ==
The London and Broadway productions both received positive reviews. The Telegraph's review said "attendance is compulsory", describing it as Barlett's best work to date.

The Globe and Mail called the play "dreary" despite its success in London and on Broadway. It is explained to be a Shakespearean-like play that has already passed its "best before" date. The author talks about how some aspects in this futuristic play came true, like how Prince Harry ends up with Meghan Markle, who like Jess is a woman of colour, or how the real King Charles III is known to express strong opinions on government issues.

== Awards and nominations ==
=== Original London production ===
Year	Award	Category	Nominee	Result
2014	Critics' Circle Theatre Award	Best New Play	Mike Bartlett	Won
2015	Laurence Olivier Award	Best New Play		Won
2015	Laurence Olivier Award	Best Director	Rupert Goold	Nominated
2015	Laurence Olivier Award	Best Actor	Tim Pigott-Smith	Nominated
2015	Laurence Olivier Award	Best Actor in a Supporting Role	Richard Goulding	Nominated
2015	Laurence Olivier Award	Best Actress in a Supporting Role	Lydia Wilson	Nominated
2015	Laurence Olivier Award	Best Lighting Design	Jon Clark	Nominated
2015	South Bank Sky Arts Award	Theatre		Won

=== Broadway production ===
Year	Award	Category	Nominee	Result
2016	Drama Desk Award	Outstanding Play		Nominated
2016	Drama Desk Award	Outstanding Actor in a Play	Tim Pigott-Smith	Nominated
2016	Drama Desk Award	Outstanding Director of a Play	Rupert Goold	Nominated
2016	Tony Awards	Best Play		Nominated
2016	Tony Awards	Best Performance by an Actor in a Leading Role in a Play	Tim Pigott-Smith	Nominated
2016	Tony Awards	Best Performance by an Actor in a Featured Role in a Play	Richard Goulding	Nominated
2016	Tony Awards	Best Costume Design of a Play	Tom Scutt	Nominated
2016	Tony Awards	Best Direction of a Play	Rupert Goold	Nominated

== Radio adaptation ==
The stage play was adapted into a radio play for BBC Radio 3's Drama on 3 and broadcast 12 July 2015, starring the cast of the original West End production. It was re-broadcast on 6 November 2016, again on BBC Radio 3.

== TV film adaptation ==
The play was adapted into a 90-minute TV film for BBC Two and Masterpiece on PBS. The adaptation first aired on BBC Two on 10 May 2017.

Before the film had even aired, politicians and biographers already did not like the idea of a non-fiction futuristic world without the Queen. After viewing the play as a whole, it was seen as more of a political thriller and tragedy. The TV film is an hour shorter than the play time due to a few parts being removed from the original script.

== See also ==
- To Play the King
