= Broken Glass (play) =

1994 play written by Arthur Miller

- Written by: Arthur Miller
- Original language: English
- Subject: American Jewish assimilation, self-hatred and the European Nazi threat
- Genre: Historical drama
- Setting: Brooklyn, 1938

Premiere
- Date premiered: 1994
- Place premiered: Booth Theatre; New York City

Broken Glass is a 1994 play by Arthur Miller, focusing on a couple in New York City in 1938, the same time of Kristallnacht, in Nazi Germany. The play's title is derived from Kristallnacht, which is also known as the Night of Broken Glass.

== Characters ==
- Sylvia Gellburg
- Phillip Gellburg, Sylvia's Husband
- Dr. Harry Hyman, Doctor of Sylvia Gellburg
- Margaret Hyman, Wife of Dr. Hyman
- Harriet, Sylvia's sister
- Stanton Case, Phillip Gellburg's employer

== Plot ==
Phillip and Sylvia Gellburg are a Jewish married couple living in Brooklyn, New York City, in the last days of November 1938. Phillip works on foreclosures, at a Brooklyn mortgage bank.

When Sylvia suddenly becomes partially paralyzed from the waist down, after reading about the events of Kristallnacht in the newspaper, Phillip contacts Dr. Harry Hyman. Dr. Hyman believes Sylvia's paralysis is psychosomatic, and though he is not a psychiatrist, he begins to treat her according to his diagnosis. Throughout the play, Dr. Hyman learns more about the problems Sylvia is having in her personal life, particularly in her marriage.

After an argument with his boss, Philip suffers a heart attack and begins dying at his home. He and Sylvia confront each other about their feelings. Before Phillip dies (although his death is never confirmed), his final words are "Sylvia, forgive me!". Upon his "death", Sylvia is cured of her paralysis.

== Productions ==
Broken Glass had its world premiere at the Long Wharf Theatre in New Haven, Connecticut in March 1994. The director was John Tillinger, with the cast that featured Ron Rifkin and Frances Conroy. Amy Irving replaced Dianne Wiest as Sylvia and David Dukes replaced Ron Silver as Dr. Harry Hyman.

The play opened on Broadway at the Booth Theatre on April 24, 1994 and closed on June 26, 1994, after 73 performances and 15 previews. The play was directed by John Tillinger and produced by Robert Whitehead, Roger L. Stevens, Lars Schmidt, Spring Sirkin, Terri Childs, and Timothy Childs. The cast featured David Dukes as Dr. Harry Hyman, Amy Irving as Sylvia Gellburg, and Ron Rifkin as Phillip Gellburg.

It premiered in the UK at the National Theatre's Lyttelton Theatre on August 4, 1994. Directed by David Thacker, the cast featured Margot Leicester and Henry Goodman.

A revival of Broken Glass, starring Antony Sher as Phillip and Lucy Cohu as Sylvia was staged at the Tricycle Theatre in Kilburn, London in September 2010, before transferring to the Vaudeville Theatre in the West End. The play ran at the Vaudeville Theatre from 16 September 2011 to 10 December 2011, with Tara Fitzgerald as Sylvia.

An adapted version of the play premiered in Athens in October 2018 directed by Aspa Kalliani.

== Television ==
The play was televised on the PBS series "Masterpiece Theatre" in October 1996, with Henry Goodman as Phillip Gellburg, Margot Leicester as Sylvia Gellburg and Mandy Patinkin as Dr. Harry Hyman.

== Awards and nominations ==
- 1994 Tony Award for Best Play - nominee
- 1994 Drama Desk Award for Outstanding Actress in a Play (Amy Irving) - nominee
- 1995 Olivier Award
  - Best Actress, Margot Leicester - nominee
  - Best Actor in a Supporting Role, Ken Stott - winner
  - BBC Award for the Play of the Year - winner
