= Jack Hollington =

British actor

- Born: 2 July 2001 (age 24)
- Occupation: Actor
- Years active: 2010–present

Jack Hollington (born 2 July 2001) is a British actor who has appeared in film, radio, stage and television productions. He made his debut in the National Theatre's production of An Inspector Calls followed by a role in the touring production of Medea. Hollington's breakthrough performance was as Nathan in the West End and National Tour play of The Full Monty. His television roles began with the Doctor Who episode, The Time of the Doctor, followed by the Casualty episode "Home".

== Career ==
In 2015, Hollington played the lead role of young Leo Colston in the BBC television production of The Go-Between alongside Jim Broadbent and Vanessa Redgrave. His performance in The Go- Between was considered by Jasper Rees in The Daily Telegraph to be: " a superbly intuitive performance from a young actor bearing a heavy burden. Hollington held his ground throughout"..."In key scenes he sang like Ernest Lough and took his cricket catch like Ben Stokes." Sam Wollaston, for The Guardian, praised Hollington's performance: "not just for his convincing performance as young Leo, but also for being a totally convincing young Jim Broadbent (old Leo)". The Go-Between was nominated for a BAFTA award in the category of best single drama in 2016.

Hollington has the role of 'Young Beowulf' in three episodes of the ITV television mini-series Beowulf: Return to the Shieldlands and has roles in feature films Bitter Harvest and Brimstone .

== Filmography ==
=== Film ===
| Year | Title | Role | Director(s) |
|---|---|---|---|
| 2010 | The Boogeyman | Denny Billings | Gerard Lough |
| 2013 | Left (Short) | Young Joe | Eamonn O'Neill |
| 2014 | James | James | Claire Oakley |
| 2014 | Advent | Tom | Mahalia Belo |
| 2015 | The Go-Between | Leo | Pete Travis |
| 2016 | Brimstone | Mathew | Martin Koolhoven |
| 2017 | Bitter Harvest | Lubko | George Mendeluk |

=== Television ===
| Year | Show | Role | Notes |
|---|---|---|---|
| 2013 | Doctor Who | Barnable | "The Time of the Doctor" |
| 2014 | Casualty | Jake Quinnell | |
| 2016 | Beowulf: Return to the Shieldlands | Young Beowulf | |
| 2017 | Fearless | Jason | |

=== Theatre ===
| Year | Show |
|---|---|
| 2008 | Camp Rock |
| 2010 | An Inspector Calls |
| 2012 | Medea (play) |
| 2013-2014 | The Full Monty |
