= Bitter Harvest (2017 film) =

2017 film directed by George Mendeluk

- Theatrical release poster
- Directed by: George Mendeluk
- Screenplay by: Richard Bachynsky Hoover
- Story by: Richard Bachynsky Hoover
- Produced by: Ian Ihnatowycz; Richard Bachynsky Hoover; Stuart Baird; Peter D Graves; Dennis Davidson
- Starring: Max Irons; Samantha Barks; Barry Pepper; Tamer Hassan; Lucy Brown; Terence Stamp; Jack Hollington; Richard Brake
- Cinematography: Douglas Milsome
- Edited by: Stuart Baird; Lenka Svab
- Music by: Benjamin Wallfisch
- Distributed by: Roadside Attractions (US); D Films (Canada)
- Release date: February 24, 2017 (United States)
- Running time: 103 minutes
- Countries: Canada; United Kingdom
- Language: English
- Budget: $21 million
- Box office: $5 million approx. (worldwide sales)

Bitter Harvest is a 2017 period romantic-drama film set in Soviet Ukraine in the early 1930s. The film is the first English language feature film depicting Ukraine's famine, the 1932–33 Holodomor. The film stars Max Irons, Samantha Barks, Barry Pepper, Tamer Hassan, Lucy Brown and Terence Stamp.

The film was directed by George Mendeluk. The story and screenplay were written by Canadian screenwriter-actor Richard Bachynsky Hoover. Filming took place in and around Kyiv, Ukraine.

== Plot ==
Ukrainian Cossack Ivan Kachaniuk defends his family in Central Ukraine's wheat and sunflower farming outskirts of Smila. Years later, in 1932, Ivan's artist grandson Yuriy marries his childhood sweetheart, Natalka, and studies at the Kyiv Art Academy. His family are independent Cossack farmers, "kurkuli". They make a living from grain, sunflowers and other crops until Joseph Stalin's collectivization campaign sends his massive Bolshevik red army to requisition 90% of Ukraine's harvest.

The State Art Institute is forced to replace the art instructors with communist instructors who censor art such as Yuriy's, condemning its expression of Ukrainian cultural identity as anti-Soviet. Yuriy storms out in disgust.

During a memorial in a pub for a friend who committed suicide, a half drunk aggressive Soviet captain insults the Ukrainian folklore, music, songs, and dance, starting a fight during which Yuriy stabs the captain in self defense. He is locked up in a brutal Soviet prison with scores of Ukrainian Kurkili - simple farmers, as well as Ukrainian nationalists and any others whom Stalin deems Enemies of the Soviet state. From his cell Yuriy witnesses daily mass executions. Sadistic prison commissar director Medvedev demands Yuriy paint his portrait in return for more food and for his life, but Yuriy senses he will be executed as soon as the portrait is completed. During their second sitting, Yuriy stabs the director in the throat with his paintbrush, killing him. He changes his clothes for the commissar's Russian uniform, takes his pistol, and escapes during a blizzard while being hunted by the Bolshevik soldier guards.

In Smila, Yuriy's wife Natalka and family are enduring the terror of farm director Commissar Sergei Koltsov who attempts to rape her and uses food as a weapon, but Natalka poisons his borscht with wild mushrooms and joins other peasant women in a Babsi ladies revolt. Sergei has survived, and orders his Bolshevik troops to put down the revolt. Yuriy's family and the villagers are imprisoned in the church, now their torture chamber and prison cell.

In the northern Kyivan forests Yuri meets Lubko, a desperately hungry boy. They help each other through the forest to a cattle train stop towards Smila. That evening they are joined at their camp by the Kholodnyi Yar (Cold Ravine) Ukrainian Cossack detachment. The next morning they engage in a bloody battle, with the Bolsheviks Gatling gunning down the uprising. Both sides suffer heavy casualties.

Yuriy and Lubko sneak aboard a cattle train full of starved Ukrainian corpses. They witness massive starvation and death of their fellow Ukrainians on the roadsides and in pits. Nearing Smila they hijack a Soviet grain truck whose sympathetic Bolshevik soldier driver joins Yuriy's rescue mission, bringing grain to the villagers. Yuriy, Natalka, and Lubko escape, others of the family starve or are murdered by Koltsov's forces. They are pursued onto another cattle train of Ukrainian corpses on their way to be dumped into fire pits, and are chased to the Soviet border, the cold and turbulent Zbruch River. They dodge bullets underwater crossing to Polish-controlled West Ukraine to get to the city of Lviv, hoping for help from the priest Andrey Sheptytsky to exchange the vast rich pastures of Ukraine for the prairies of Manitoba, Canada.

== Cast ==
- Max Irons as Yuriy
- Samantha Barks as Natalka
- Barry Pepper as Yaroslav
- Tamer Hassan as Sergei
- Terence Stamp as Ivan
- Aneurin Barnard as Mykola
- Tom Austen as Taras
- Lucy Brown as Olena
- Richard Brake as Medved
- Edward Akrout as Professor Temchuck
- William Beck as Stefan
- Richard Ashton as Father Ostapovich
- Malcolm Freeman as Molotov
- Jack Hollington as Lubko
- Gary Oliver as Joseph Stalin
- Ostap Stupka as Boiko
- Valeriya Khodos as Oksana

== Location ==
The film depicts Kyiv and its Ukrainian hamlets and farm land, and was filmed in Pyrohiv Kyiv district outdoor museum, Ukraine, which doubles for the village outside Smila of a century ago. The concept and screenplay were created by Richard Bachynsky Hoover, who was inspired to make the film after visiting the Pyrohiv museum in 1999. He wrote the script in 2013.

== Production ==
Canadian Half-Ukrainian Richard Bachynsky Hoover first visited Lviv and Kyiv Ukraine in 1999 then in 2004 to protest the Yanukovych party during the Orange Revolution. He drafted the screenplay and approached Ian Ihnatowycz, who agreed to fund research and development before committing in 2013 to finance the US$21 million film in its entirety.

Filming began in Ukraine on November 15, 2013, under the working title "The Devil's Harvest". Ihnatowycz said, "Given the importance of the Holodomor, and that few outside Ukraine knew about this man-made famine because it had been covered up by the Kremlin regime, this chapter of history needed to be told in English on the silver screen for the first time in feature film history."

The shoot ended in Kyiv on February 5, 2014, concurrent with the 2013 Euromaidan and 2014 Revolution of Dignity demonstrations, in which Bachynsky Hoover and local crew members took part. Bachynsky Hoover was injured by a chemical grenade.

Post-production continued in early 2014 at London's Pinewood Studios, using the James Bond tank to film underwater scenes.

== Release ==
Roadside Attractions, an Indy arm of Americas Lions Gate Films Corp., released the film in the US on February 24, 2017. "D" Films Canada launched Bitter Harvest on March 3 in Canada. The film was launched in other countries during the first quarter of 2017.

== Reception ==
=== Box office ===
Global box office sales were approximately US$1 million. It was screened in various venues in more than 100 countries in 2017/18.

=== Critical response ===
Bitter Harvest received generally negative reviews from critics. On the review aggregator website Rotten Tomatoes, 15% of 60 critics' reviews are positive, with an average rating of 3.9/10. The website's consensus reads: "Bitter Harvest lives down to its title with a clichéd wartime romance whose clumsy melodrama dishonors the victims of the real-life horrors it uses as a backdrop." Sheri Linden of the Los Angeles Times called the film "utterly devoid of emotional impact." Metacritic, which uses a weighted average, assigned the film a score of 34 out of 100, based on 17 critics, indicating "generally unfavorable" reviews. Peter Debruge of Variety wrote "there can be no doubt that the events deserve a more compelling and responsible treatment than this." The New York Times review wrote, "The topic is worthy, but the execution is a bit heavy-handed."

Godfrey Cheshire for RogerEbert.com gave Bitter Harvest 2 stars out of 4. He wrote, "Unfortunately, "Bitter Harvest" can't even claim the virtues of a superior dramatic feature. Born in Germany of Ukrainian descent, Mendeluk has spent most [of] his career as a director of Canadian TV movies, which this film unsurprisingly resembles. [...] Its narrative and visual approach almost suggests a compendium of the clichés one should avoid in a film like this."

In positive reviews, Adrian Bryttan of The Ukrainian Weekly praised the film's direction and storytelling, calling it the "world-class Ukrainian art film of our time." The Sydney Morning Herald called the film "a rousing tale with political pertinence". Several reviews agreed that the film would raise awareness, and did accurately depict the subject matter.

== See also ==
- Famine-33
- The Guide
- Russia-Ukraine relations
