= A Season with McLaren =

- Also known as: The Team: A Season With McLaren
- Developed by: John Gau Productions
- Narrated by: Tim Pigott-Smith
- Country of origin: United Kingdom
- Original language: English
- No. of series: 1
- No. of episodes: 7

Production
- Executive producer: Tony Salmon
- Running time: 30 minutes

Original release
- Network: BBC2
- Release: 12 November – 24 December 1993

The Team: A Season With McLaren is a 7-part TV series produced by John Gau Productions for the BBC during the 1993 Formula One season, first transmitted on BBC2 between 12 November and 24 December 1993. The series follows the team and regular drivers Ayrton Senna and Michael Andretti, as well as test driver Mika Häkkinen, giving a behind-the-scenes insight to the McLaren team.

The series consisted of seven episodes, each approximately 30 minutes in length:

1. A Man For All Seasons (12 November 1993)
  Mika Häkkinen joins the team in Portugal.
2. The Rookie (19 November 1993)
  Michael Andretti prepares for the race in Montreal.
3. A Few Good Men (26 November 1993)
  A look at the hard work of the team mechanics as they rebuild a damaged car in Monaco.
4. The Boy From Brazil (3 December 1993)
  Working with Ayrton Senna.
5. Friendly Persuasion (10 December 1993)
  Marketing and Public Relations, focusing on the British Grand Prix.
6. The Rules of the Game (17 December 1993)
  The team reacts to FISA's ban on active suspension.
7. Good-bye To All That (24 December 1993)
  Senna wins his final victory, making McLaren the most successful Grand Prix team in history.

The episodes are narrated by Tim Pigott-Smith.
