= Iain Burnside =

Scottish pianist and accompanist

Iain Burnside is a Scottish classical pianist and accompanist, and an occasional presenter on BBC Radio 3.

Following study at Merton College, Oxford, the Royal Academy of Music and the Chopin Academy, in Warsaw he became a freelance pianist, specialising particularly in song repertoire. He has collaborated with many singers, and was particularly close friends with the late soprano Susan Chilcott. Burnside is the godfather of Chilcott's son, Hugh, and following her death in 2003 became his legal guardian.

Other singers he has worked and recorded with include Dame Margaret Price, Galina Gorchakova,Lawrence Brownlee, Rosa Feola and Roderick Williams, with whom he has recorded the complete Finzi baritone songs,.

After presenting the Cardiff Singer of the World competition, he became a presenter on Radio 3, for many years fronting the weekly song-orientated show Voices for which he won a Sony Radio Award. Later he began presenting the Sunday morning programme. He has also written various musical plays: A Soldier and a Maker on the life of Ivor Gurney, premiered in 2012 and later broadcast on. BBC Radio 3; Shining Armour on Clara Schumann; Why does the Queen Die? and Swansong on Franz Schubert; Journeying Boys on Verlaine and Rimbaud.
