= Richard Goulding =

British actor

- Occupation: Actor
- Years active: 2008–present
- Known for: King Charles III; The Windsors

Richard Goulding (born 1980/1981) is a British actor, best known for playing Prince Harry in the 2014 stage play King Charles III, and its 2017 BBC TV adaptation, as well as in the 2016 television series The Windsors.

== Education ==
Goulding was educated at Shrewsbury School, Oxford University, and the Guildhall School of Music and Drama.

== Career ==
Goulding is a visiting director at the Guildhall School of Music & Drama, and at which he appeared as Ivor Gurney in A Soldier and a Maker in 2012. His other stage work includes The Seagull (2007–2008) and A Mad World My Masters (2013) for the Royal Shakespeare Company, The Way of the World at the Sheffield Crucible (2012), both runs of Posh (2010 and 2012), the 2012 King Lear at the Almeida Theatre and the 2013 Titus Andronicus and A Mad World My Masters with the Royal Shakespeare Company. Film and television work has included The Iron Lady, Foyle's War and Fresh Meat.

In 2019 he appeared as Boris Johnson in Toby Haynes's Channel 4 production, Brexit: The Uncivil War, and as Daniel Radcliffe in the satirical comedy, Island of Dreams. In 2021 he played David Boutflour in the Netflix series White House Farm.

== Theatre ==
Year	Title	Role	Theatre	Notes
2007	King Lear	cast	Royal Shakespeare Company directed by Trevor Nunn	
2007	The Seagull	Konstantin	Royal Shakespeare Company directed by Trevor Nunn	
2008	An English Tragedy	John Amery	Watford Palace Theatre	
2009	The Elephant in the Room	Will	New Wimbledon Theatre	
2010	Posh	George	Royal Court	
2011	Edgar and Annabel	Tony	Royal National Theatre	
2011	There is a War	John	Royal National Theatre	
2011	Good	Freddie	Manchester Royal Exchange	
2012	The Way of the World	Sir Wilful	Sheffield Crucible	
2012	A Soldier and a Maker	Ivor Gurney	Barbican	
2012	Posh	George	Duke of York's Theatre	
2013	King Lear	Edgar	Almeida Theatre	
2013	Candide	Playwright / Screenwriter	Royal Shakespeare Company at the Swan Theatre	
2013	Titus Andronicus	Bassianus	Royal Shakespeare Company at the Swan Theatre	
2013	A Mad World My Masters	Dick Follywit	Royal Shakespeare Company	
2014–2015	King Charles III	Prince Harry	Almeida Theatre & Wyndham's Theatre	Nominated for the Olivier Award: Best Supporting Actor
2015–2016	King Charles III	Prince Harry	Music Box Theatre	Nominated for the Tony Award: Best Featured Actor in a Play
2016	They Drink It in the Congo	Tony	Almeida Theatre	

== Filmography ==
=== Film ===
Year	Title	Role	Notes
2011	The Iron Lady	Naval Attaché	
2015	Queen of the Desert	Havenhurst	
2016	Me Before You	Freddie Foster	
2021	Benediction	George Sassoon	
2023	Wicked Little Letters	Mr. Scales	
2024	Scoop	Stewart MacLean	

=== Television ===
Year	Title	Role	Notes
2008	King Lear	Messenger	Television film directed by Trevor Nunn
2009–2010	M.I.High	Maurice Hutchinson	2 episodes
2010	Foyle's War	Jack Stanford	Episode: "The Hide"
2011	Doctors	Adam Dukes	Episode: "The Pale Cast of Thought"
2014	Ripper Street	Edgar Morton	4 episodes
2016	Fresh Meat	Tomothy Pembersley	4 episodes
2016–2023	The Windsors	Prince Harry	15 episodes
2017	King Charles III	Prince Harry	Television film
2019	Brexit: The Uncivil War	Boris Johnson	Television film
2019	Traitors	Jerry Roxborough	4 episodes
2020	White House Farm	David Boutflour	4 episodes
2020	Belgravia	Oliver Trenchard	6 episodes
2020	The Crown	Edward Adeane	5 episodes
2021	A Very British Scandal	Charles Jauncey	2 episodes
2023	Dalgliesh	Lord Martlesham	2 episodes
2024	Belgravia: The Next Chapter	Oliver Trenchard	3 episodes
2024	Grantchester	Lord Marwood	Episode #9.4
2025	Midsomer Murders	Jack Pollock	Episode: "Lawn of the Dead"
