= Margot Leicester =

British actress (born 1949)

Margot Leicester (born September 1949) is a British actress.

== Career ==
Leicester has appeared in King Charles III (2017) as Camilla and was nominated for an Olivier Award for Best Actress in 1995 for Broken Glass. She is also notable for television work such as Families, The Take and Five Days.

== Personal life ==
She is married to the director David Thacker. The couple live with their four children in London.

== Filmography ==
=== Film ===
Year	Title	Role	Notes
2017	Mum	Pam	Short film
2015	Blue Borsalino	Jean Delaware	Short film
2013	Full Time	Vinnie's Wife	Short film
2007	1408	Mrs. Innkeeper	

=== Television ===
Year	Title	Role	Notes
2026	Ann Droid	Phyllis	6 episodes
2021–2022	Coronation Street	Mimi Halliday	8 episodes
2017	King Charles III	Camilla	TV movie
2005–2016	Doctors	Christine Leverty / Jane Reed / Mrs. Reuben / Anne Morden	4 episodes
2014	New Tricks	Barbara Haynes	Episode: Breadcrumb
2013	Frankie	Dee Olden	Episode #1.5
1991–2010	The Bill	Bridget Stone / Mrs Seaton / Miriam Tyler / Val Kenyon / Mrs. Scholes / Paula Goddard	7 episodes
2009	Margot	Cathy	TV movie
2003, 2009	Holby City	Dawn Fisher / Norma Kilner	2 episodes
2009	The Take	Lena Summers	Mini-Series
1994, 2009	Heartbeat	Evelyn Page / Mrs. Eliot	2 episodes
2007	Law & Order: UK	Catherine Mortimer	Episode: Buried
2007	HolbyBlue	Kathy French	Episode #1.7
2007	Five Days	Hazel Betts	5 episode:
2005	MI-5	Auntie May	Episode #4.3
2005	Messiah: The Harrowing	Evelyn McArdle	Mini-Series
2004	Midsomer Murders	Kay Settingfield	Episode: Sins of Commission
2004	Wire in the Blood	Deborah Armstrong	Episode: Right to Silence
2003	Waking the Dead	Eileen Murdoch	2 episodes
1999	Harbour Lights	Rita Blade	7 episode:
1998	KIng Girl	Pam	TV movie
1998	Touching Evil	Ann Keller	2 episodes
1998	Killer Net	Meryl Griffiths	Mini-Series
1998	Kavanagh QC	Jeanetta Morgan	Episode: Dead Reckoning
1997	Peak Practice	Dr. Wellington	4 episodes
1997	Where the Heart Is	Jean Alsop	Episode: Summoned by Bells
1996	Hetty Wainthropp Investigates	Annie Mosscrop	Episode: Lost Chords
1996	Broken Glass	Sylvia Gellburg	PBS series Masterpiece Theatre
1996	Casualty	Megan Owen	Episode: Night Moves
1995	Ghosts	Mrs. Pearson	Episode: The Chemistry Lesson
1994	Performance	Mariana	Episode: Measure for Measure
1994	Chandler & Co	The Real Mrs. Savage	Episode: Family Matters
1994	Medics	Lynne Prior	Episode: All in the Mind
1992	Families	Jane Richard	2 episodes
1991	Perfect Scoundrels	Mrs. Lawrence	Episode: The Carpetbaggers
1989	The Manageress	Moira Fitzgerald	Episode: Collapsible Brollies
1989	Shalom Salaam	Jackie's mum	TV mini-series
1987	Pack of Lies	Thelma	TV movie (CBS)
1977, 1984	Crown Court	Clerk of Court / Jury Foreman	2 episodes
1978	Sense of Place	Marty	Episode: From the Roots Came the Rapper
1977	The XYY Man	Nancy Watkins	Episode: When We Were Very Greedy
1975	Second City Firsts	Lucy Rainmarsh	Episode: Waiting at the Field Gate

=== Theatre ===
Year	Title	Playwright	Role	Venue
2017	Seventeen	Matthew Whittet	Emilia	Hammersmith Lyric Theatre
2016	The Winter's Tale	William Shakespeare	Paulina	Octagon Theatre, Bolton
2014	King Charles III	Mike Bartlett	Camilla	Almeida and Wyndham theatres
2006	Coriolanus	William Shakespeare	Volumnia	Globe Theatre
2002	The Lucky Ones	Charlotte Eilenberg	Anna Mosenthal	Hampstead Theatre
2002	Richard II	William Shakespeare		Lyttelton Theatre
2001	God only knows	Hugh Whitemore	Kate Coker	Vaudeville Theatre
1999	The Memory of Water	Shelagh Stephenson		Vaudeville Theatre
1994	Broken Glass	Arthur Miller	Sylvia Gellburg	Lyttelton Theatre
1993	The Last Yankee	Arthur Miller	Patricia Hamilton	Duke of York's Theatre
1986	Antony and Cleopatra	William Shakespeare	Charmian	Haymarket Theatre
1985	Macbeth	William Shakespeare		Crucible Theatre, South Yorkshire
1988	An Enemy of the People	Henrik Ibsen (Arthur Miller's translation)		Playhouse Theatre
1978	Snapshots	Rony Robinson		Theatre Royal Stratford East
1973	Armstrong's Last Goodnight	John Arden		Northcott Theatre
1973	Judge Jeffreys	Christopher Bond		Northcott Theatre
1973	The Owl and the Pussycat Went to See	Sheila Ruskin and David Wood		Northcott Theatre
