= Helmer & Son =

Helmer & Son is a 2006 short film directed by Søren Pilmark. The film was nominated for the 2007 Academy Award for Best Live Action Short Film.
