= Dean Cavanagh =

Playwright and Musician

Dean Cavanagh

Dean Cavanagh is a screenwriter, novelist and Playwright born in Bradford, West Yorkshire. In 1990, at the height of the acid house scene, he founded the club culture magazine Herb Garden and a band with Enzo Annecchini. His electronic music outfit, Glamorous Hooligan, was picked up by Warner Bros. offshoot Arthrob, and in 1996, they released an album, Naked City Soundtrax. Glamorous Hooligan's first album Wasted Youth Club Classics was released by indie label Mass of Black in 1994. Cavanagh has stated that his proudest moment was getting Robert Anton Wilson to guest on one of the tracks. As a musician, he featured on John Peel's Sounds of the Suburbs TV show, in the late 1990s. As a clubland promoter, he ran underground house music, and techno, clubs in Bradford, called Tolerance, before moving on to Leeds, where he promoted the Soundclash club bringing in DJs such as Andrew Weatherall, Alex Patterson, Adrian Sherwood and J. Saul Kane.

Cavanagh has written two theatre plays with Irvine Welsh that have been performed internationally. Babylon Heights premiered in San Francisco in 2006 before a run in Dublin. Performers premiered at The Assembly Rooms, Edinburgh as part of the festival in 2017. Both plays have been published.

== Author ==
His debut The Secret Life of The Novel was published by Zani in 2017. His short story "Mile High Meltdown" was included in the Disco Biscuits anthology, published by Sceptre.

== Journalist ==
As a journalist he has contributed to The Guardian, The Daily Mail, The Times, The Telegraph, New Musical Express, Melody Maker, Positive Energy of Madness, The Face, as well as the Herb Garden, and i-D. He has also worked in copywriting, penning commercials and working alongside directors John McFarlane and Tarsem Singh before progressing to writing TV, theater plays and film.

Cavanagh wrote a late night sitcom called Honky Sausages that McFarlane directed for UK Play TV and gave a start to the actress Laila Morse, EastEnders. Cavanagh developed many projects with Terry Gilliam's producer Ray Cooper for John Kamen's company RadicalMedia.

Cavanagh works regularly with Irvine Welsh. Their play Babylon Heights has been performed to critical acclaim in Dublin, Chicago, Los Angeles, San Francisco and New Zealand. In 2004, Cavanagh and Welsh were BAFTA nominated for their BBC Three short film Dose, starring Jonathon Lewis Owen, Kate Jarman and Julia Davis and directed by Philip John. Wedding Belles is a feature film written by Welsh and Cavanagh that was transmitted by C4 in March 2007. It stars Shirley Henderson, Michelle Gomez, Michael Fassbender, Shauna Macdonald, and Kathleen McDermott. It is produced by Jemma Rodgers and directed by Philip John. Cavanagh and Welsh co-executive produced Wedding Belles. It was nominated for a best writing BAFTA.

== Scripts ==
Cavanagh has done a number of script doctoring assignments for companies such as Endemol, Warner Bros., Sony, StudioCanal and Lionsgate, Miramax both in the UK and the US. Cavanagh and Welsh have a three-season, six-part TV series called The Food Chain that was developed for HBO.

Cavanagh created the Internet series Svengali! starring Roger Evans, Sally Phillips, Martin Freeman, Matt Berry and Boy George. iTunes distributes the series worldwide for free. The film version was released in early 2014 but Cavanagh walked away from the project.

Cavanagh has completed writing and directing his first movie, "Kubricks" with his son Josh. "I've been following Kubrick researchers like Rob Ager and Jay Weidner for the last few years and I really wanted to dramatize a story based around Kubrick as an inspirational enigma. There is a wealth of material about the esoteric side of Kubrick on the net and Ager and Weidner are great places to start the journey from."

Cavanagh still makes music under the name Culture Is No Friend Of Mine.

On 23 July 2020 it was announced that Cavanagh and Welsh were working on an adaptation of Welsh's novel Crime as a 6-part miniseries for streaming service BritBox.

Cavanagh and Welsh adapted Alan McGee's 2013 autobiography for the film Creation Stories (2021).
