= Roy Smiles =

British playwright

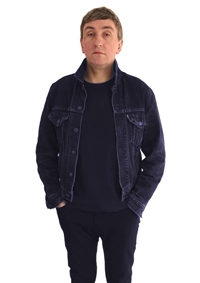
- Born: 1966 (age 59–60); London, England
- Occupations: Dramatist, playwright, songwriter
- Years active: 1987–present
- Website: https://roysmiles.bandcamp.com

Roy Smiles (born 1966) is a singer-songwriter & playwright from Ealing, London. He is also an occasional actor.

Smiles has written 27 theatre plays, the best known of which is Kurt and Sid, a 2009 London West End production about the fictional meeting of Sid Vicious and Kurt Cobain, starring Danny Dyer & Shaun Evans.

He has released eleven albums of songs: Drunks & Dreamers, Time's Moving On, Seize The Day, Autumn Song, Bremen, The Trains & The Rain, Northern Angels, Lost Souls, November's Child,, Tales Of The Oceans. & Stranger To The Sun

He has released twelve compilations of his music: London Hymns, Go Gently (Best Of), A Land Called Home (Best Of II), Forty Big Hits, 40 More Big Hits, 40 Big Hits III, Songs For Lost Lovers, Best Of III, The Folk Songs, The Country Songs, The London Songs. & The Ballads.

== Career ==
Smiles' stage plays focus largely on biographical subjects such as Spike Milligan (Ying Tong - A Walk With The Goons), Kurt Cobain (Kurt & Sid), Marilyn Monroe (Reno), George Orwell (Year of the Rat), Tony Hancock (The Lad Himself) & Robert F. Kennedy (The Last Pilgrim).

Before establishing himself as a playwright Smiles was half of the Brighton sketch comedy duo: Smiles & Kemp with Michael Kemp (1986-1989). Following that he was in the original cast of the Heather Brothers 1960's musical: A Slice Of Saturday Night. He performed in the show over 700 times. The play transferred from the Kings Head Theatre to The Arts Theatre running for two years (1989-1991).

His first play staged in 1992 at the Battersea Arts Centre, Schmucks was about a fictitious meeting between Groucho Marx and Lenny Bruce.

In 1992 his farce about masons in the Metropolitan Police: Roberto Calvi Is Alive & Well was staged at the Finborough Theatre. Winning a Guinness Fringe Theatre Award.

In 1993 Smiles played ticket tout Ted Nutall in the first season of ITV's Frank Stubbs Promotes with Timothy Spall.

In 1994 Danny Boy was staged at the Etcetera Theatre, a farce mocking sectarianism through the eyes of a Catholic woodwork teacher in Derry who finds out he's Jesus.

The Promised Land - a play commissioned to commemorate the 50th anniversary of V.E Night and set on the same night, was staged at the Kings Head Theatre in 1995.

The Boys Of Summer – his play set in a HIV ward was staged at the Old Red Lion in 1995, with Ian Bartholomew. It was restaged in Tel Aviv to great acclaim in 2000 under its original title: The Little Green Monkey Club. Where it became a landmark cultural event as the first play to tackle HIV in Israel.

In 1996 his play about troubled singer Janis Joplin: Get It While You Can - A Conversation With Janis Joplin was staged at the Etcetera Theatre. Winning his second Guinness Fringe Theatre Award.

In 1997/1998 he played Roy Leyton in two seasons of spoof BBC police documentary: Operation Good Guys.

Stand Up – his play about his unhappy time performing on the London comedy circuit in the 1980's was staged at the Old Red Lion in 1999, with Lucy Davies.

Bombing People – a farce about the Enola Gay & the dropping of the Atom Bomb, was staged at the Jermyn Street Theatre in 2000, with Michael Fitzgerald.

Sick Dictators – a farce about Chilean dictator General Pinochet's visit to London for surgery, was staged at the Jermyn Street Theatre in 2001, directed by James Bolam.

In 2002 he played Itzhak Heller, a Jewish collaborator, in Roman Polanski's Oscar winning Best Picture The Pianist.

Ying Tong – A Walk with the Goons, the story of Spike Milligan's nervous breakdown whilst writing The Goon Show, was staged at West Yorkshire Playhouse in 2004, transferring the following year to the New Ambassadors Theatre in London's West End before touring the US, Australia, New Zealand and South Africa.

The Ho-Ho Club (an updating of his play Stand Up) was staged at the Kings Head Theatre in 2006, directed by Karl Howman and starring Sally Lindsay.

Year Of The Rat – his play about George Orwell's attempt to woo wife-to-be Sonia Brownell whilst writing 1984 was staged at West Yorkshire Playhouse in 2007, with Hugo Speer as Orwell.

Good Evening – about the Beyond The Fringe team had its world premier in South Africa in 2007 then was broadcast on Radio 4 in 2008, with Benedict Cumberbatch as Dudley Moore.

Pythonesque – the story of the Monty Python Flying Circus team, opened in South Africa in 2008 before moving to Edinburgh as part of the Fringe Festival in 2009.

The Last Pilgrim – about Senator Robert F. Kennedy's doomed campaign for the American Presidency was staged in London in 2010. It was nominated for the Offie for Best Play.

Funny People, his book about his childhood comedy heroes, was published by Oberon Books in 2011.

The Lad Himself – his play about self-loathing radio & TV comedian Tony Hancock was staged at the Edinburgh Festival in 2013.

Memories Of A Cad – his radio play about actor Terry-Thomas dealing with Parkinson's Disease was broadcast on Radio 4 in 2014, with Martin Jarvis as Terry-Thomas & Alistair McGowen as Richard Briers.

Reno – his play about Marilyn Monroe & Arthur Miller's marriage imploding during the making of The Misfits had its world premiere at the Brighton Festival in 2014.

Plum – his play about writer PG Wodehouse's infamous broadcasts from Berlin in WW2 was staged at The Court Theatre in Christchurch, New Zealand in 2014.

Year of the Rat, Ying Tong , Pythonesque and Kurt & Sid are published by Oberon Books.

Ten Plays by Roy Smiles was published by Oberon Books in 2018. Containing his plays on Albert Camus, Richard Burton, Oscar Wilde, Evelyn Waugh, Tony Hancock, Lenny Bruce, the Enola Gay, the Iraq War, Marilyn Monroe & the 2011 London Riots.

Ying Tong, Pythonesque and Good Evening were broadcast on BBC Radio 4. As were his plays: Dear Arthur Love John, Goodnight From Him and Memories Of A Cad.

The Funny Girls – his play about Barbra Streisand & Joan Rivers rivalry/friendship, was first staged at The Wimbledon Theatre in September 2021.

A Sober October – his biographical memoir on surviving bowel cancer, was published on Amazon Books in 2022.

The Lad Himself – his play about Tony Hancock, had its London premiere at Upstairs At The Gate in Highgate in April 2022.

Forty three of his plays are available on Amazon Books.

The Lyrics – his book of the lyrics of his songs, was published on Amazon Books in November 2023.

His music sites passed the target of 500,000 listens as of September 2024.

The Czech language version of Kurt & Sid was produced in Prague at the Malostranská beseda in 2025.

Down By The Thames, a 3 track EP, was released in November 2025.

A Stranger To The Sun, a single, was released on Spotify in January 2026.

The Ballads, a compilation of his ballads, was released on Spotify in June 2026.

In August of 2026 he released his 11th album: Stranger To The Sun.

The single A Flower In London was released in September 2026.

== Plays ==
- Schmucks – Battersea Arts Centre, London, 8 July 1992
- Roberto Calvi Is Alive & Well – Finborough Theatre, London, 14 October 1992
- Top of the Town – Kings Head Theatre, London, 1992
- Idiot's Waltz – Finborough Theatre, London, 9 September 1993
- The Court Jester – Warehouse Theatre, Croydon, London, 13 December 1994
- Danny Boy – Etcetera Theatre, London, 1994
- The Boys of Summer – Old Red Lion Theatre, London, 11 July 1995
- Dinner with the Borgias – Warehouse Theatre, Croydon, London, 8 December 1995
- The Promised Land – Kings Head Theatre, London 1995
- Get It While You Can, A Conversation With Janis Joplin – Etcetera Theatre, London, 3 November 1996
- The Exiles (or Highgate Shuffle) – Hen and Chickens Theatre, London, 30 November 1997
- Stand-Up – Old Red Lion Theatre, London, 23 March 1999
- Bombing People – Jermyn Street Theatre, London, 22 August 2000
- Sick Dictators – Jermyn Street Theatre, London, 31 July 2001
- Lunatic's Tango – Hen and Chickens Theatre, London, 26 April 2002
- Ying Tong: A Walk with the Goons – West Yorkshire Playhouse, Leeds, 22 October 2004
- The Ho Ho Club (formerly Stand Up) – Kings Head Theatre, Islington, London, 26 June 2006
- Good Evening – Theatre-on-the-Bay, South Africa, 2007
- Year of the Rat – The Forge at The Court Theatre, Christchurch, New Zealand, 19 October 2007
- Pythonesque – Theatre-on-the-Bay, South Africa, 2008
- Kurt and Sid – Trafalgar Studios, London 9 September 2009
- Backstage – The Forge at The Court Theatre, Christchurch, New Zealand, 30 October 2009
- The Last Pilgrim – The White Bear Theatre, London, 28 September 2010
- Burlesque – A Musical (co-written with Adam Megiddo) – Jermyn Street Theatre, 9 November 2011.
- The Lad Himself – The Gilded Balloon, Edinburgh Festival, 1 August 2012.
- Plum – The Court Theatre, Christchurch, New Zealand, 9 August 2014.
- Reno – The Rialto Theatre, Brighton, 16 December 2014.
- The Funny Girls - Wimbledon Studio Theatre, 17 September 2021.
