= Martina Cole =

British crime writer (born 1959)

- Born: 30 March 1959 (age 67); Essex, England
- Occupation: Writer
- Children: 2
- Writing career
- Period: 1992–present
- Genre: Crime
- Notable works: Dangerous Lady; The Runaway; The Take
- Notable awards: Crime Writers Award
- Website: www.martinacole.co.uk

Eilidh Martina Cole (born 30 March 1959) is a British crime writer. As of 2021 she has released twenty-six crime novels, most of which examine London's gangster underworld. Four of her novels, Dangerous Lady, The Jump, The Take and The Runaway have been adapted into high-rating television dramas. She has achieved sales of over fourteen million in the UK alone and her tenth novel, The Know, spent seven weeks on The Sunday Times hardback best-sellers list.

== Early life ==
Eilidh Martina Cole was born 30 March 1959, in Essex, England, to Irish Catholic parents, and was the youngest of five children. Her mother was a psychiatric nurse from Glasnevin, County Dublin and her father was a merchant seaman from Cork City. Her cousin is the Cork politician Denis Cregan. She was expelled from her convent school aged 15 after allegedly being caught reading a Harold Robbins novel.

She married for the first time aged 16, but the marriage only lasted a year. She had her first child at the age of 18. Her parents both died when she was in her early 20s.

Prior to her literary success, Cole had a variety of low-paid jobs, including working as a cleaner, a wine waitress, an agency nurse and a supermarket shelf-stacker.

== Career ==
=== Writing ===
Cole's breakthrough came in 1991, when her manuscript for Dangerous Lady was accepted by the literary agent Darley Anderson and sold for a record £150,000. The book was published by Headline the following year.

Most of her novels feature a female protagonist or antihero, and some take place within the Irish community in and around London.

In December 2011, readers using madaboutbooks.co.uk voted their favourite Martina Cole book. The Take won by 780 votes and was put at the top of the list of Martina Cole novels. Goodnight Lady came second, followed in third by Maura's Game.

Cole received the Cartier Diamond Dagger from the Crime Writers' Association in 2021.

=== Television ===
A four-part TV adaptation of Dangerous Lady was broadcast on ITV in 1995, and in 1998 ITV broadcast a four-part adaptation of The Jump. The Take was serialised on British television on Sky1 in June 2009, which starred Tom Hardy as Freddie. Sky1 has also commissioned an adaptation of The Graft, which has yet to go into production.

In March 2011 The Runaway, was shown on Sky1 and Sky1 HD. It is based on Cole's 1997 novel of the same name.

In 2008 Martina Cole presented a drama documentary series on ITV3 called Martina Cole's Lady Killers, which told the story of six of history's most notorious female serial killers, including Myra Hindley, Beverly Allitt and Rose West. Cole explored the reasons why women kill, and why society is surprised when they do. Each programme told the story of an individual killer with expert analysis and dramatic reconstruction. The programme proved to be a ratings hit for ITV3 and transferred to ITV1 in 2009.

Cole filmed an investigative documentary, Martina Cole Girl Gangs: Los Angeles for Sky1 in 2009. This focused on the role of girls in these gangs, which have been responsible for crimes ranging from drug dealing and car theft to robbery and murder.

In 2014 she appeared in a documentary about Holloway Prison, called Inside Holloway.

Additionally, she has appeared on ITV's This Morning, The Crime Thriller Club, The Wright Stuff for Channel 5, ITV's popular daytime show Loose Women, The One Show and two episodes of Pointless Celebrities for BBC One, and a 2004 edition of The Culture Show.

Along with TV executive producer, Barry Ryan, Cole co-owns the film and television production company "2 Queens".

=== Theatre ===
Three of Cole's novels have been adapted for the stage by the Theatre Royal, Stratford East, London: Two Women in 2010; The Graft in 2011, and Cole's first novel, Dangerous Lady in 2012.

=== Music ===
In 2011 Cole founded her own record label, Hostage Music. The London-based band Alabama3 has signed up to the label.

== Personal life ==
Cole lives in a Grade II listed, 15th-century manor house near Sevenoaks, Kent. She also has a house in northern Cyprus.

She remarried in the 1990s, but the marriage ended in divorce. She had her second child when she was 39.

Cole regularly holds creative writing classes in UK prisons. She is a patron of the single-parent charity Gingerbread, and also a patron of Women's Aid.

Since her 20s she has suffered from rheumatoid arthritis after breaking both arms as a child. The arthritis has worsened over time, and now makes it painful for her when writing.

== Bibliography ==
- Goodnight Lady (1994)
- The Jump (1995)
- The Runaway (1997)
- Two Women (1999)
- Faceless (2001)
- The Know (2003)
- The Graft (2004)
- The Take (2005)
- Close (2006)
- Faces (2007)
- The Business (2008)
- The Family (2010)
- The Faithless (2011)
- The Life (2012)
- Revenge (2013)
- The Good Life (2014)
- Get Even (2015)
- Betrayal (2016)
- No Mercy (2019)
- Loyalty (2023), with Jacqui Rose
- Guilty (2024), with Jacqui Rose
- No Regret (2025), with Jacqui Rose
- The Stretch (2026)

=== DI Kate Burrows series ===
- The Ladykiller (1993)
- Broken (2000)
- Hard Girls (2009)
- Damaged (2017)

=== Maura Ryan series ===
- Dangerous Lady (1992)
- Maura's Game (2002)

== Videography ==
- Martina Cole's Double Bill: The Jump & Dangerous Lady (2006)
- The Take (2009)
- The Runaway (2011)
