= Begbie =

The origin of the family name Begbie, (orig. Baikbie, 1566. Baigbie, 1594), can be traced to the Kingdom of Scotland, with historical records and modern census data indicating that the name can be found most frequently in the Edinburgh and Haddingtonshire (East Lothian) areas. Two of the earliest recorded individuals bearing the name were Johnne Baikbe [sic], a tenant in Drumhillis, and Williame Baikbe [sic] in Drem, who were cited to appear before the Privy Council of Mary, Queen of Scots, in 1566.

== Toponymic surname ==
The toponymic surname Begbie is derived from the Old Norse personal name and byname Baggi + Old Norse býr; 'settlement' or 'farm'. Whilst also appearing in Old Danish, Baggi was used to describe a 'bag', 'pack', 'bundle' or 'ram' (male sheep) in Old Norse. During the Middle Ages, Baggi was also used as a byname for a 'Norwegian, man from Norway.' The earliest documented usage is recorded in Norway during the 14th century, (in Bohuslän, now in Sweden).

In its contemporary form, Bagge appears both as a given and family name in Denmark and the southern regions of Sweden and Norway. (Derivative forms of the name can also be found in Scandinavia. For example, the Danish patronymic form Baggesen, and equivalent Norwegian form Baggesson, meaning "Son of Bagge"). 'Bagge Baggesen', a 51-year-old male, is noted in the Danish national census of 1850 as residing in Ålborg.

== Settlement ==
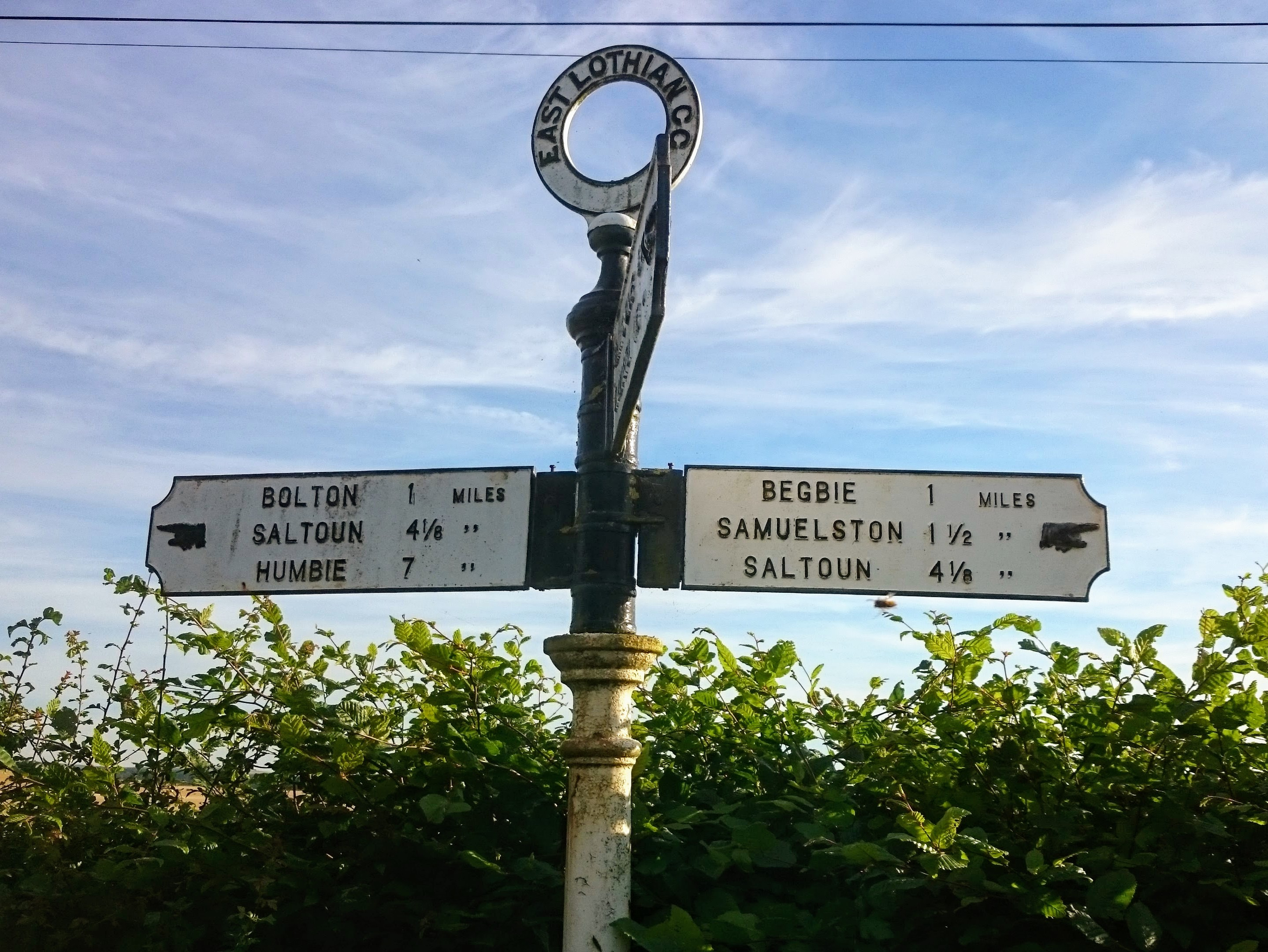
Vintage cast iron sign on B6368, near Haddington (image taken in 2016)

The place name refers to the small hamlet of Begbie, (Location: 55°55′42″N 02°48′54″W), 0.5-mile (0.80 km) east of Samuelston, near the market town of Haddington, East Lothian. Begbie is one of a number of settlements in East Lothian whose place name elements are Scandinavian in origin. Others include Humbie, Pogbie and Blegbie. (The same place name elements found in Begbie can be found in the Swedish settlements of Baggeby, Stockholm County, and Bäggeby, Uppsala County, and also the English settlement of Bagby, North Yorkshire).

The lands of Begbie (orig. Bagby) were gifted to the Abbey of St Mary, (a nunnery lying to the east of Haddington), by its founder, Countess Ada de Warenne, wife of Henry of Scotland and mother to Malcolm IV and William I, upon her death in 1178.

== Notable people and characters ==
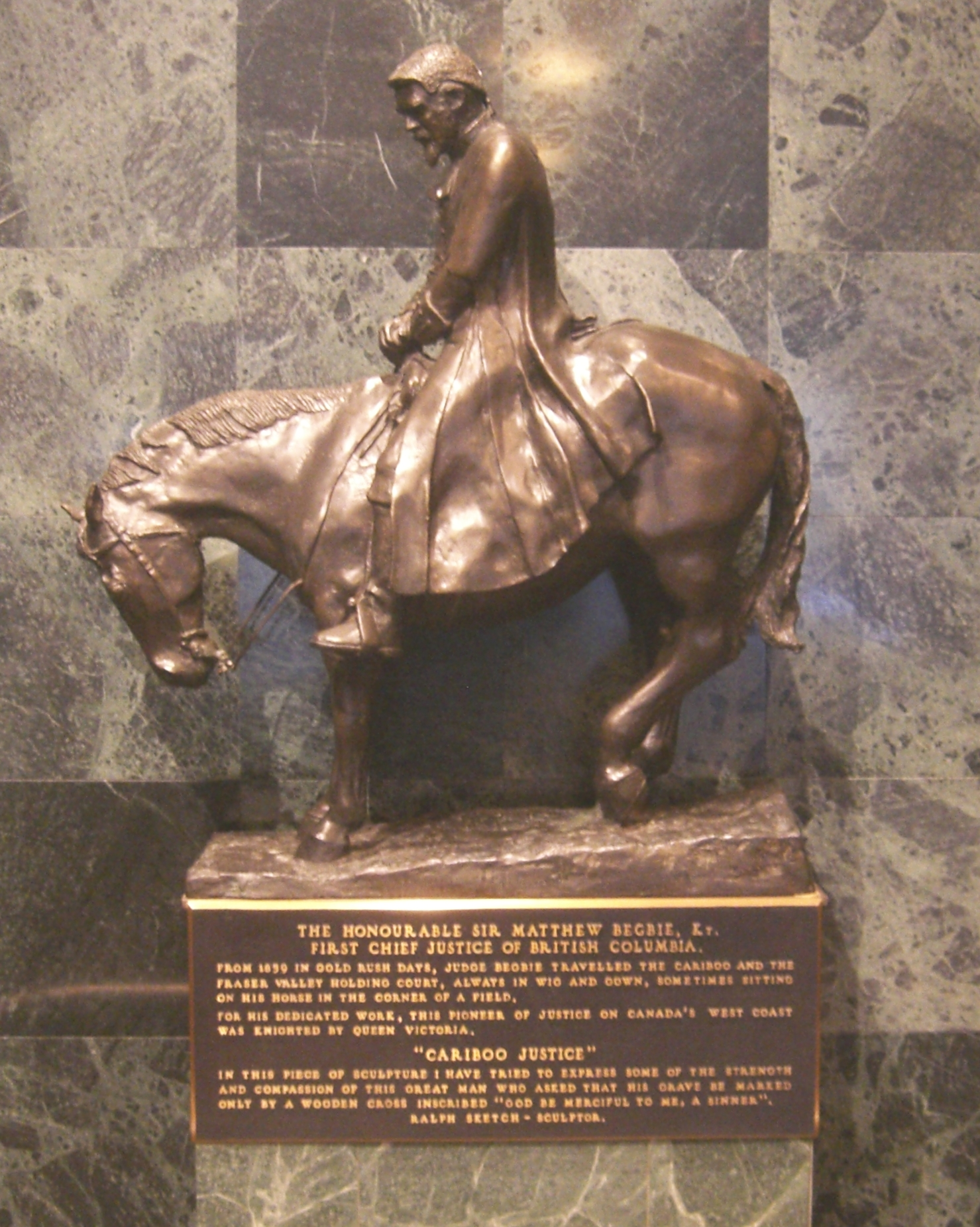
Bronze statue of The Honourable Sir Matthew Begbie, KT.

- Alfred William Begbie (1801–1873), Civil servant in British India
- Alison Begbie (1762-1823), companion of Scottish poet Robert Burns
- Denis Begbie (1914–2009), South African cricketer
- Edith Marian Begbie (1866-1932), Scottish suffragette
- Francis (Franco) Begbie, a character in the Irvine Welsh novel Skagboys and its sequels Trainspotting, Porno and The Blade Artist
- Graeme Begbie (born 1986), Australian field hockey player
- Harold Begbie (1871–1929), English author and journalist
- Herbert Gordon Smirnoff Begbie (1905-1973), former bishop of Parramatta
- Isaac Begbie (1868-1958), Scottish footballer
- James Begbie (1798–1869), British medical doctor
- James Warburton Begbie (1826–1876), British medical doctor
- Jeremy Begbie (born 1957), Thomas A. Langford Research Professor at Duke Divinity School, Duke University
- John (Jack) E Mouland Begbie (1900-1983), founding member and Leader of the BBC Scottish Orchestra
- Matthew Baillie Begbie (1819–1894), British-born judge who served in British Columbia
- Sheila Begbie (born 1957), Scottish footballer
- Thomas Begbie (1862-1896), Scotland international rugby union player

== Gallery ==
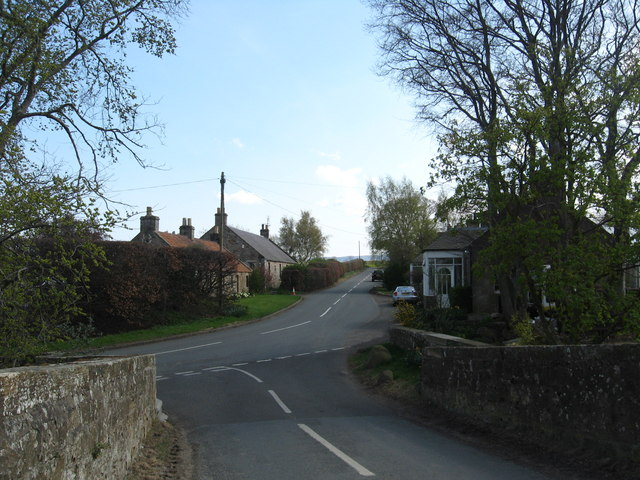
A view of the hamlet of Begbie, looking south from the bridge over the River Tyne

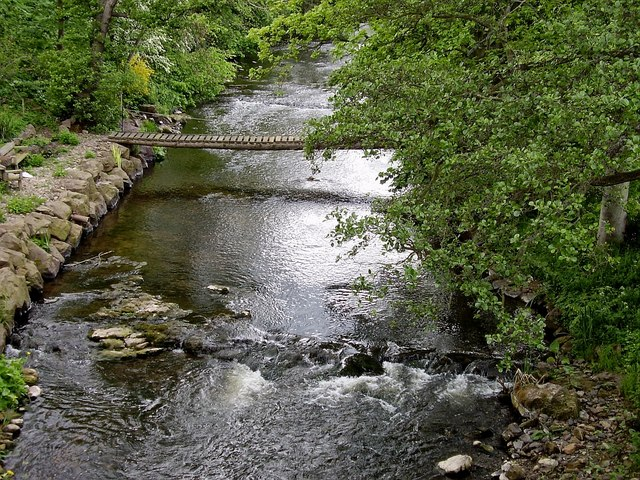
View overlooking the River Tyne at Begbie

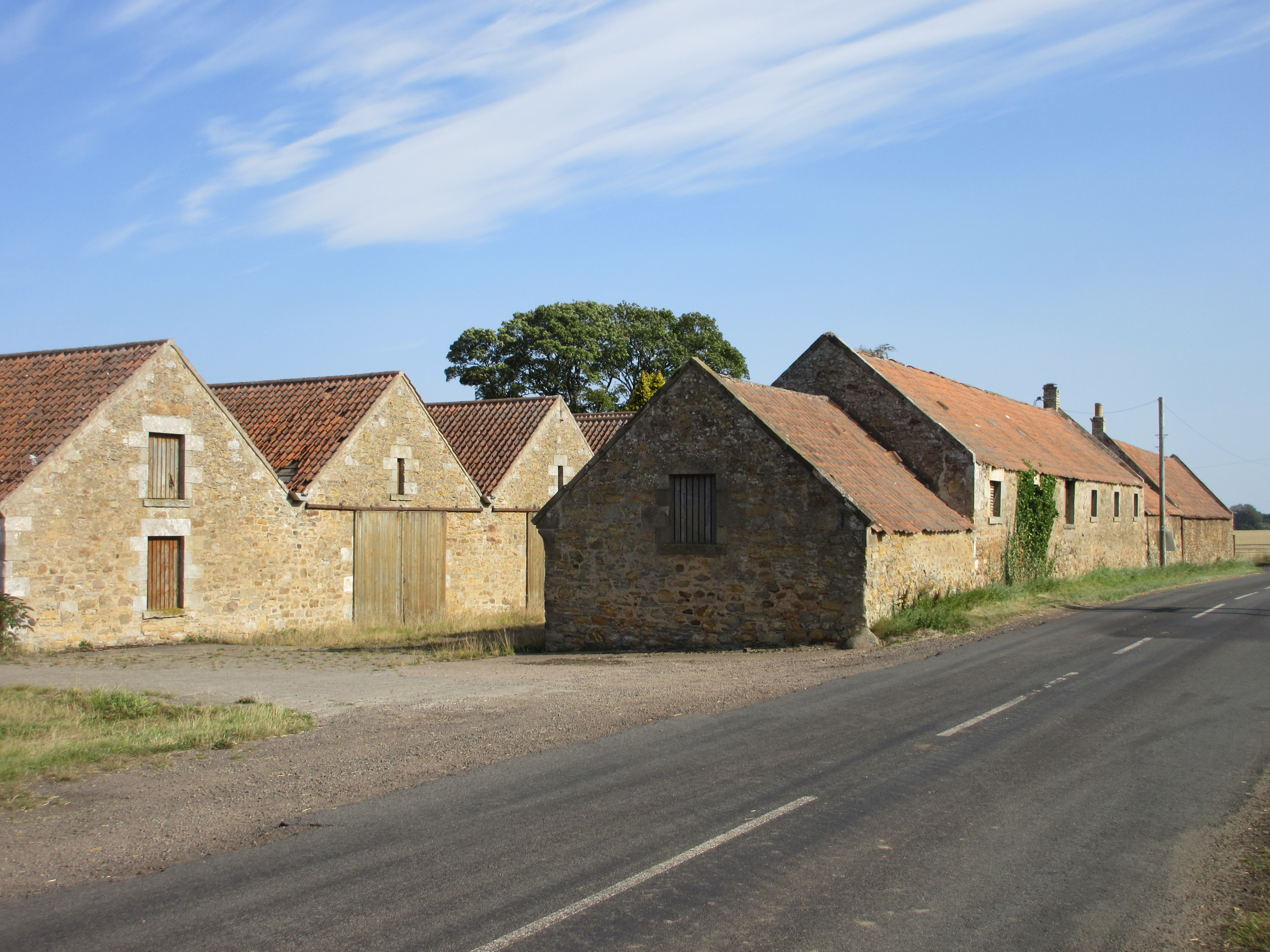
Begbie Farm outbuildings.

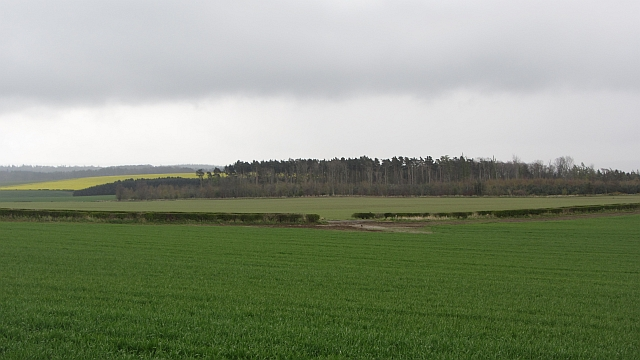
View looking south-east from Begbie, towards Begbie Wood.

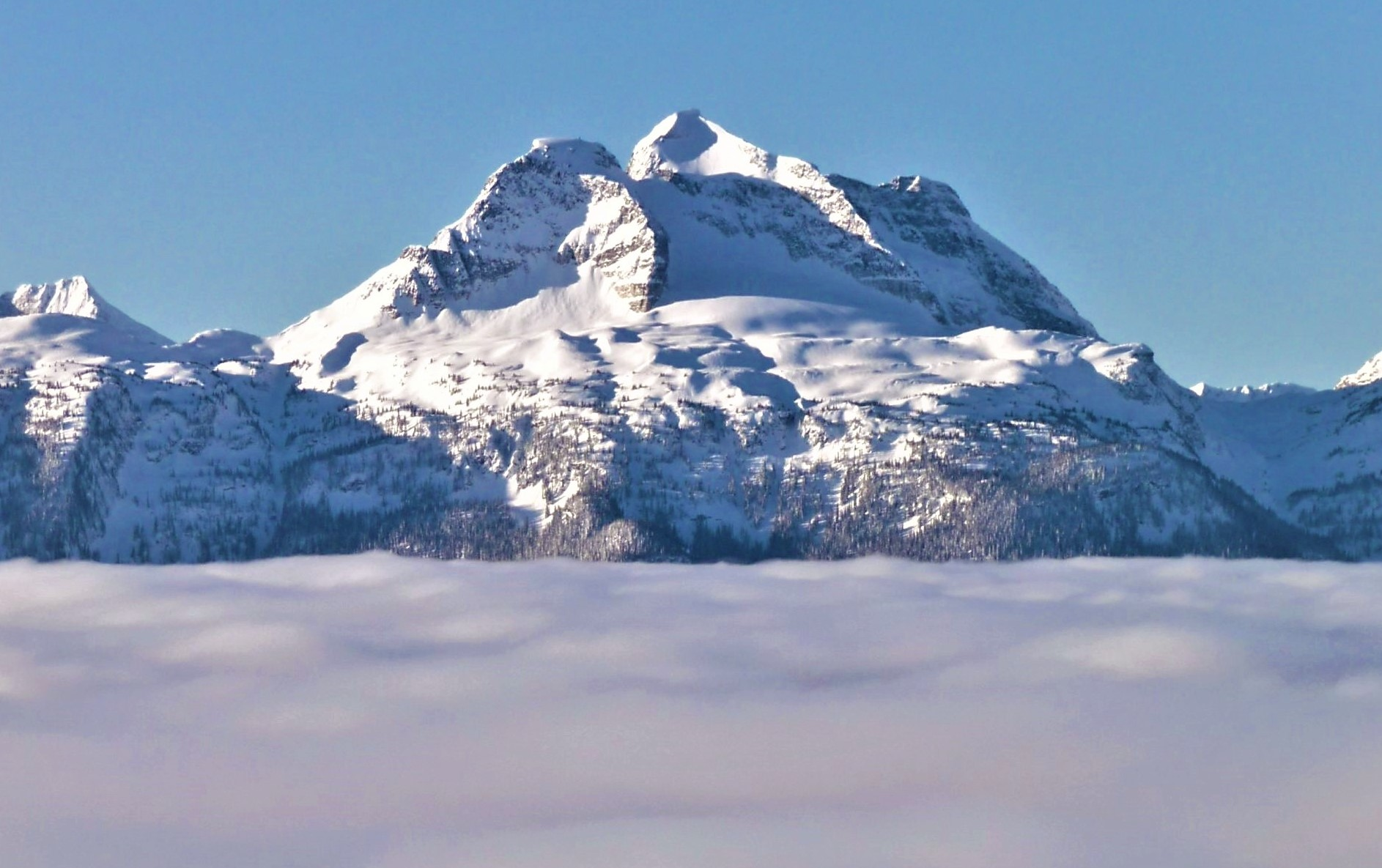
Mount Begbie, Revelstoke, British Columbia, Canada

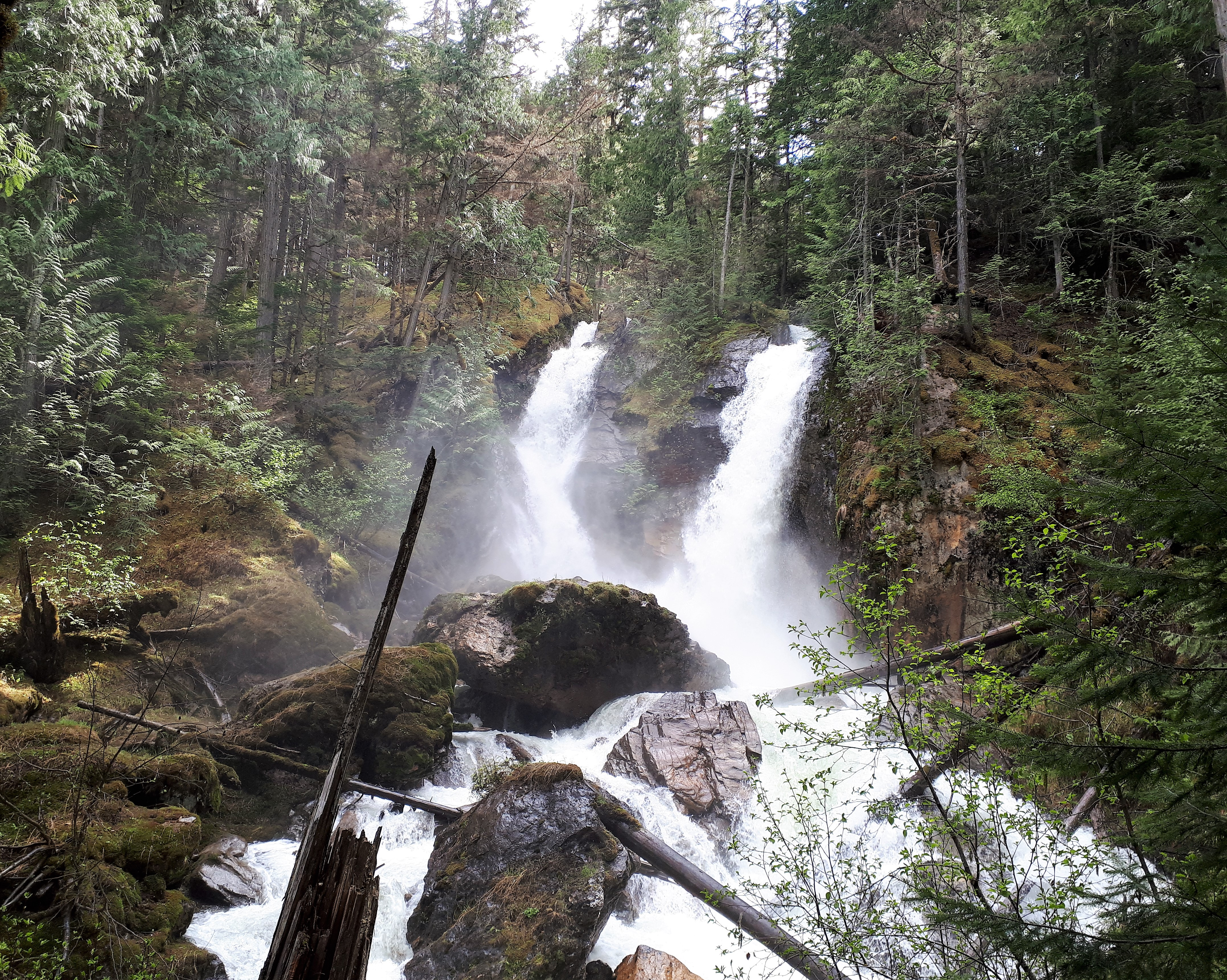
Begbie Falls, near Revelstoke

== See also ==
- Sir Matthew Begbie Elementary School, public elementary school in Vancouver, British Columbia
- Mount Begbie, a named peak near Revelstoke, British Columbia
- Bagby, a village in North Yorkshire, England
