= Filth (novel) =

1998 novel by Irvine Welsh

- Author: Irvine Welsh
- Language: English, Scots
- Genre: Crime novel
- Publisher: Jonathan Cape (UK); W. W. Norton (US)
- Publication date: 1998
- Publication place: Scotland
- Media type: Print (Paperback & Hardback)
- Pages: 393 pp
- ISBN: 0-224-05278-0
- OCLC: 67804913
- Followed by: Crime

Filth is a 1998 novel by Scottish writer Irvine Welsh. It was adapted into a 2013 film of the same name, directed by Jon S. Baird with James McAvoy in the lead role. A sequel, Crime, was published in 2008.

== Plot summary ==
Bruce Robertson is a detective sergeant serving in Edinburgh's "Lothian Constabulary". Robertson is a Machiavellian, intensely misanthropic man who spends his time indulging in cocaine and alcohol abuse, sexually abusive relationships, compulsive gorging on junk food, and, most of all, his penchant for "the games" – Bruce's euphemism for the myriad foul plots he hatches directed at workmates. He is able to pander to all of his vices during his annual holidays in Amsterdam.

The novel begins by introducing the murder of Efan Wurie, a case Bruce has been assigned. The plot has little to do with the actual crime; instead, the novel traces Bruce throughout his life, told in a first-person, stream-of-consciousness style. Through narrative devices such as the tapeworm he acquires, the reader explores the facets of Bruce's personality and learns about his past, as well as the various tedious police routines Bruce absconds from, his often-backfiring sexual endeavours, and his various short- and long-term schemes and plots against his colleagues (ultimately to raise his chances of gaining the hoped-for promotion to detective inspector). Apart from the general malevolent scheming, Bruce also seeks to satisfy his cravings for violence, drugs, sex, and pornography along the way while happily voicing his racism, anti-Catholic sectarianism, and misogyny, all the while pining for his ex-wife.

As the novel progresses, Bruce's mental health begins to deteriorate; it is revealed that he has drug addiction and bipolar disorder, which, along with his inability to form meaningful, trust-based relationships, are exacerbated by latent, unresolved psychological problems caused by childhood abuses. Eventually, Bruce is forced into taking leave due to injuries he suffers while dressed as his ex-wife, leading to the revelation that he committed the racially motivated murder that serves as the novel's main plot and that the colleagues he despises – particularly his boss Robert Toal – have been aware of his guilt all along and have been protecting him from the consequences of his actions out of a mixture of loyalty and pity. At the end of the story, Bruce kills himself, with his last thoughts being regret that his daughter has witnessed the suicide meant to punish his wife. Additionally, the tapeworm – already distraught over the loss of the other worms living in Bruce's gut (as a result of medication Bruce's doctor prescribed) – is expelled with his waste and dies with the host.

== Characters ==
=== "Polis" ===
- Bruce Robertson: The novel's protagonist and anti-hero, Bruce Robertson is an amoral, Machiavellian, misanthropic, racist, sexist Detective Sergeant.
- Ray Lennox: Bruce's co-worker and friend.
- Robert Toal: Bruce's workplace superior; held in contempt by Bruce, who nevertheless must attempt to curry his favour to win a promotion.
- Peter Inglis: Another co-worker of Bruce, whom he suspects of being gay.
- Amanda Drummond: A third co-worker of Bruce's, and the only one who openly disapproves of his behaviour and lifestyle.

=== Others ===
- Carole – Bruce's ex-wife.
- Stacey – Bruce's young daughter.
- Clifford Blades: Registrar General for The Scotland Office, a member of Bruce's masonic lodge; a neurotic, insecure man, Clifford's marriage problems form one of the novel's major subplots.
- Bunty Blades: Cliff Blades' wife and target of Bruce's dubious affections.
- Shirley – Carole's sister and Bruce's sister-in law.
- Tom Stronach – Footballer and Bruce's neighbour.
- Alex "Lexo" Setterington and "Ghostie" Gorman – Career criminals who live in Edinburgh.
- Ocky – A hapless petty criminal and police informant whom Bruce regularly exploits.
- Rhona – Bruce's childhood girlfriend, in which the history of said relationship is revealed not by Bruce, but the tapeworm.

== Plot devices ==
=== Language ===
Welsh's style of writing involves mainly Scottish English; but incorporates elements and loans from the Scots language (e.g. "tae" is "to", "dae" is "do"), mainly the Edinburgh dialectal form. Also, Bruce uses rhyming slang, a common element of urban Scots dialects (such as "Sherman tank" – wank; Demi Moore – "hoor" (i.e. whore), Jackie Trent – "bent", and so on). Most importantly, Robertson refers to the murder victim as a "silvery", silvery moon – "coon", a deeply offensive characterization of a black man.

=== Themes ===
In Filth, Welsh deals with freemasonry, drug abuse, sexism, racism/sectarianism, pornography, prostitution and alcohol abuse, among other problems faced by the Scottish working class.

=== Carole ===
Carole, Bruce's ex-wife and the mother of his child, Stacey, is a device Welsh uses to reflect an outsider's view of Bruce Robertson's character; certain chapters only involve Carole's inner monologue related to Bruce. (It later transpires that it is, in fact Bruce fantasising while dressed as Carole.)

=== The Tapeworm ===
At a certain point in the book, the narrative starts to be interrupted by a tube-like structure that appears on top of the text, and at first is only made of the word "eat" being repeated amid the zeros that fill the empty space within the tube. It is later revealed that this is actually the thoughts of the tapeworm growing inside Bruce's intestines.

At first, the tapeworm only encourages Bruce to eat. Later, after becoming self-aware (and naming itself "The Self"), the tapeworm starts to ask basic existential questions and names Bruce as "The Host". It also stumbles upon the existence of other worms (collectively named by the initial worm as "The Other"). The tapeworm's monologues, which grow lengthier and more eloquent as the novel progresses, explain Bruce's backstory and how he became the person presented to the reader.

== References to other Irvine Welsh novels ==
Ray Lennox – Lennox is the protagonist of Crime, Welsh's sequel to Filth.

Alex "Lexo" Setterington – Bruce references the violent rape that Lexo and his gang of football hooligans committed in Marabou Stork Nightmares.

"Ghostie" Gorman – Ghostie was among the rapists mentioned above in Marabou Stork Nightmares. In Filth Bruce kills Gorman by biting out his tongue, causing him to reel backwards and fall out of a two-story window, where he suffers fatal head injuries.

Francis Begbie – Begbie was a main character in Trainspotting, its prequel Skagboys and sequel Porno. He is briefly mentioned a few times in Filth, associated with Lexo as running a second-hand furniture store in Leith. Mention of the business Begbie and Lexo are in is also made in Marabou Stork Nightmares and Porno.

Other minor characters mentioned in passing throughout Filth include: Simon "Sick Boy" Williamson (from Trainspotting, Skagboys and Porno), "Juice" Terry Lawson (from Glue and Porno), Danny "Spud" Murphy (from Trainspotting, Skagboys and Porno), and "Post" Alec Connolly, a recurring character in Glue.

== Film adaptation ==
A film adaptation of Filth was released on 27 September 2013, directed by Jon S. Baird, from his own script.
