= Trainspotting =

Trainspotting may refer to:

- Trainspotting (hobby), noting locomotive names
- Trainspotting (novel), 1993, by Irvine Welsh
  - Trainspotting (film), 1996, based on the novel
    - Trainspotting (soundtrack), two albums from the film
  - T2 Trainspotting, a 2017 sequel film
  - Trainspotting (musical)
- "Trainspotting", a song in the 1997 Primal Scream album Vanishing Point
