= Reheated Cabbage =

- First edition (UK)
- Author: Irvine Welsh
- Language: English
- Genre: Short story collection
- Publisher: Jonathan Cape (UK); W. W. Norton & Co. (US)
- Publication date: 2009
- Publication place: Scotland
- Media type: Print (hardback & paperback)
- Pages: 275 pp
- ISBN: 978-0-224-08055-2
- Preceded by: If You Liked School You'll Love Work

Reheated Cabbage is a collection of short stories by Scottish writer Irvine Welsh. It was released in the United Kingdom in July 2009.

The collection is made up of rare works previously published in magazines and out-of-print anthologies, including a Christmas dinner with Trainspotting's psychotic Francis Begbie, science fiction tale "The Rosewell Incident", and a story following Terry "Juice" Lawson in Florida. All of the stories in Reheated Cabbage with the exception of the novella "I Am Miami" had been published in the 1990s in now unavailable media.

== Stories ==
=== A Fault on the Line ===
This story is Welsh's gruesome exposition of a dysfunctional marital relationship. Malky's partner Claire persuades him to take her and their children to the pub. After a few drinks and a shortcut back home through the station, a train approaches just as the family are crossing the line and rips off her legs. He is distraught, as there is a Hibs-Hearts game on television at 2pm that he does not want to miss.

=== Catholic Guilt (You Know You Love It) ===
A homophobic Scots gay basher builder living in London dies while having sex, and in his afterlife is condemned by St Peter to participate eternally in the sex acts he deplored — buggering his friends.

=== Elspeth's Boyfriend ===
The sociopathic Frank Begbie's sister Elspeth has a new boyfriend, to whom Begbie does not take kindly. Begbie subsequently ruins his family's Christmas dinner.

=== Kissing and Making Up ===
An unnamed man has a misogynistic internal monologue about his recent breakup. He enters a strip club, but is beaten heavily by the owner, Seeker, after offending one of the dancers.

=== The Rosewell Incident ===
A civilisation of telepathic aliens kidnap a teenager from Rosewell, Midlothian and learn to speak Scots. Many years later, a teenage, cigarette-addicted alien makes contact with a gang of bored drug using teenagers, in order to put on a rave concert for the entire planet, much to the chagrin of the elder alien in charge of observing Earth, who does not want to interfere with the planet's course of events.

=== The State of the Party ===
Two friends, Crooky and Calum, take acid in a bar before running into their old friend Bobby ("Boaby"), who is on heroin. After the three arrive at a party, Bobby dies of an overdose, and the two, along with a couple of other partygoers, are kicked out of the flat before being assaulted by a group of youths.

=== Victor Spoils ===
Two acquaintances, Gavin and Victor, over ecstasy pills and pints of lager, discuss their respective claims to a mutual sexual partner, Sarah, who meanwhile is at the dentist getting her wisdom teeth extracted. The two resolve to allow Sarah to choose between them, only to find upon her return that she is offended by their possessive attitude and is not interested in either of them.

=== I Am Miami ===
The novella reunites former problem student now turned successful DJ Carl Ewart and his old school friend Terry "Juice" Lawson with their former teacher.

== Reception ==
The book was positively received by James Walton of the Telegraph who noted that "while the book is unlikely to bring Welsh new readers, fans will notice that his customary strengths are in place. The stories are very funny in their black, often cartoonish way. There’s also a degree of zest to the storytelling that leaves more decorous short stories looking pallid by comparison."
