= Jon S. Baird =

Scottish film director

- Born: 9 November 1972 (age 53); Peterhead, Aberdeenshire, Scotland
- Education: University of Aberdeen
- Years active: 2002–present

Jon S. Baird (born 9 November 1972) is a Scottish film director. Born and raised in Aberdeenshire, he began his career at BBC Television.

== Education ==
Baird studied at the University of Aberdeen in the 1990s, where he graduated with an MA in Politics and International Relations.

== Career ==
Baird wrote, directed, and produced Filth (2013), which was based on Irvine Welsh's 1998 novel and starred James McAvoy. In 2014, Baird directed the television drama Babylon for Channel 4, which was produced by Danny Boyle. Baird was approached by HBO in 2015 to direct an episode of their Martin Scorsese and Mick Jagger-produced show Vinyl, created by Terence Winter. In 2016, he directed the second episode of I'm Dying Up Here for Showtime, produced by Jim Carrey. In 2018, Baird directed, for eOne and BBC Films, Stan & Ollie, a feature film about comedians Laurel and Hardy, starring Steve Coogan and John C. Reilly.

In 2020, Baird directed Tetris, a feature film produced by Matthew Vaughn and distributed by Apple TV+. The film delves into the legal conflicts surrounding the release of the video game. Filming took place in Glasgow. Scenes were shot in Aberdeenshire, the University of Aberdeen, and in Aberdeen. Baird described the experience as "a dream come true" and hoped that it would kickstart further interest in the region as a filming location. In 2022 Baird directed Stonehouse, a three-part docudrama starring Matthew Macfadyen as the disgraced British MP John Stonehouse, who infamously faked his own death in 1974.

== Filmography ==
Short film

Year	Title	Director	Producer	Writer
2003	It's a Casual Life	Yes	Yes	Yes

=== Feature film ===
Year	Title	Director	Producer	Writer
2008	Cass	Yes	Yes	Yes
2013	Filth	Yes	Yes	Yes
2018	Stan & Ollie	Yes	No	No
2023	Tetris	Yes	No	No
2025	Everything's Going to Be Great	Yes	No	No

=== Television ===
Year	Title	Notes
2014	Babylon	3 episodes
2016	Vinyl	Episode "E.A.B"
2016	Feed the Beast	Episodes "Secret Sauce" and "Screw you Randy"
2017	I'm Dying Up Here	Episode "Midnight Special"
2023	Stonehouse	3 episodes

Associate producer

- Patrick Kielty...Live! (1999)
- The RDA (2001)
- Green Street Hooligans (2005)

== Awards and nominations ==
- Winner of Breakthrough British Filmmaker (London Critics Circle)
- Nomination for Best British Film (London Critics Circle)
- Best Screenplay Nomination (Writers' Guild of Great Britain)
- Best Director and Best Film Nominations (BAFTA Scotland)
- Best Director Nomination (British Independent Film Awards)
- Best British Film Nomination (Empire Film Awards)
- Winner of BAFTA Scotland best director for Stan & Ollie
