= Mark Renton =

Fictional character

- Ewan McGregor as Mark Renton in Trainspotting (1996)
- First appearance: Trainspotting (1993)
- Last appearance: Dead Men's Trousers (2018)
- Created by: Irvine Welsh
- Portrayed by: Ewan McGregor

In-universe information
- Nicknames: Rents; Rent Boy
- Family: Davie Renton, Sr. (father); Cathy Renton (mother); Billy Renton (older brother); Davie Renton, Jr. (younger brother); Nina (niece)
- Nationality: Scottish
- Birthplace: Leith, Edinburgh, Scotland

Mark Renton, also known by the nicknames Rent Boy or Rents, is a fictional character and the protagonist of the novels Trainspotting (1993) and Porno (2002) written by Irvine Welsh. He also appears in the 1996 film adaptation of Trainspotting and its sequel T2 Trainspotting (2017), in both of which he is portrayed by Ewan McGregor.

== Character biography ==
=== Novels ===
==== Trainspotting (1993) ====
In the late 1980s, Mark Renton is an unemployed heroin addict living in the Leith district of Edinburgh. He attempts to quit heroin, but finds it too difficult and resorts to buying opium suppositories from shady dealer, Mikey Forrester. Later, at a party with his friends, Simon "Sick Boy" Williamson, Francis Begbie, Danny "Spud" Murphy, Stevie and Tommy, Dawn, the infant daughter of Simon and a woman named Lesley, dies in her cot, devastating Sick Boy and inspiring him to get clean from heroin. After witnessing Dawn's death, Renton resumes heroin use.

After continuing to collect unemployment benefit, Renton later meets with Tommy, who is now depressed due to being dumped by his girlfriend. He asks Renton to supply him with heroin to help him cope. Spud and Renton are arrested for stealing. Spud is sent to prison, but Renton avoids jail time due to attending rehab. He hints that the underlying cause of his addiction was from the death of his catatonic brother Davie. Soon after, Renton's other brother Billy is killed from a bombing attack by the Provisional Irish Republican Army. Renton relapses into heroin once more and moves to London, where he has an encounter with a homosexual Italian man named Gi. He later goes back to Edinburgh for the funeral of Matty, a fellow addict.

After witnessing so much death related to heroin, he decides to get clean again whilst in London, but returns to Edinburgh again to visit his former dealer Johnny Swan, who recently had his leg amputated from heroin abuse, and Tommy, who is dying of AIDS. He meets once again with Spud, Begbie and Sick Boy, as well as another friend "Second Prize", and the five sell a large amount of heroin to a dealer for £16,000. After celebrating in a pub, Renton decides to steal the money from his friends and walk away to a new life, leaving a small share for Spud.

==== Porno (2002) ====
Several years later, Renton is a now nightclub owner in Amsterdam and has not used heroin in years. One night, Renton sees Carl Ewart, a DJ from Edinburgh (a character from Welsh's novel Glue), who recognises him. Later, Sick Boy learns from some of Carl's friends that Renton now lives in Amsterdam, and the pair agree to meet in Zurich, but Renton instead flees to San Francisco. Renton visits his hometown of Leith one more time, but is seen by Begbie, who is still angry over Renton stealing their money years earlier. He runs across the road in an attempt to attack Renton, but is hit by a car.

Renton takes Begbie to hospital and flees Edinburgh for the last time with £60,000 which he stole from Sick Boy, and two of his friends Nikki and Diane. Sick Boy visits Begbie in the hospital as the two plot to find and kill Renton and take back their stolen money.

=== Films ===
==== Trainspotting (1996) ====
The film follows much of the plot laid out by the novel, with some changes.

In the film, Mark Renton is a 26-year-old, unemployed man who lives with his parents in Edinburgh, engaging in heroin use with Sick Boy (Jonny Lee Miller), Spud (Ewen Bremner) and their dealer Swanney "Mother Superior" (Peter Mullan). Begbie (Robert Carlyle) and Tommy (Kevin McKidd) urge Renton to cease heroin use and get clean, which Renton unsuccessfully tries to do with the use of opium suppositories. At a nightclub, he meets a girl called Diane (Kelly Macdonald), who he later has sex with at her house. He discovers the next morning that she is below the age of consent and her 'flatmates' are actually her parents. She threatens to report him to the police if he does not continue the relationship.

Tommy begins using heroin after being dumped by his girlfriend, and Renton begins to relapse into heroin use after the death of Dawn. Renton, Spud and Sick Boy are caught shoplifting and Renton is sent to rehab while Spud is sent to prison and Sick Boy narrowly escapes. He becomes depressed due to having no meaning to his life and quickly relapses, but nearly dies from an overdose in Swanney's home. Renton withdraws from heroin cold turkey and later visits Tommy, who has been infected with AIDS. He later relocates to London on Diane's advice and gets a job as a real estate agent. Soon after, he is tracked down by Begbie, who is a fugitive back home after robbing a jewellery store, and Sick Boy, now a pimp and drug dealer.

They return home to attend the funeral of Tommy, who has died of toxoplasmosis. They reunite with the recently released Spud, and the four buy £4,000 worth of heroin from Mikey Forrester, which they resell to a well-connected dealer in London for £16,000. They celebrate at a pub, but Renton feels disillusioned by his friends after Sick Boy admits that he would steal the money and Begbie violently attacks an innocent man after his suit is stained by beer. Renton asks Spud if he would be willing to steal the money for themselves, but Spud fears the consequences.

While getting some rest at a hotel room, Renton decides to take the money and leave. He leaves £4,000 in a safety deposit box for Spud to collect. Begbie destroys the hotel room after learning Renton has betrayed them, which gets him arrested by the police. Meanwhile, Renton walks away to start a new life.

==== T2 Trainspotting (2017) ====
20 years later, Renton is now 46 and lives in Amsterdam with his wife. Filed for divorce and suffering from a midlife crisis, he returns to Edinburgh for a nostalgic trip. He visits Spud and saves him from a suicide attempt. Spud tells him where to find Sick Boy, and subsequently, Renton goes to see him at a pub that Sick Boy owns. Their reunion turns sour and he beats Renton, still bitter about the betrayal. Later, Renton gives Sick Boy his share of the £16,000 that he stole, but Sick Boy complains to his girlfriend Veronika that he is not satisfied and will string Renton along in an elaborate plan to gain his revenge.

Meanwhile, Begbie escapes prison. Renton and Sick Boy begin development of a brothel in the upper floor of Sick Boy's pub, and Renton begins an affair with Veronika. Spud also joins in on the scheme. Although Sick Boy is initially still furious with Renton for stealing the money, they later reconcile and resume their friendship. Renton later encounters Begbie by chance at a nightclub, and narrowly escapes a stabbing attempt from Begbie. The plot thickens as Begbie visits Spud and Veronika, stealing Veronika's phone to tell Renton and Sick Boy to come to the pub. Spud arrives too late to warn the duo of Begbie's plan, and Sick Boy is knocked out by Begbie after defending Renton, who in turn fights with Begbie on the top floor of the pub, leaving Renton hanging by his neck from electrical wiring. Begbie tries to hang Renton, but he is knocked out by Spud with a toilet bowl.

Renton and Sick Boy leave Begbie outside the prison and resume their friendship, while Veronika returns to Bulgaria and Spud reconciles with his family. Renton returns to his father's home and they embrace, with Renton going back to his childhood bedroom and dancing to a remix of "Lust for Life".

== Development ==
Film producer Andrew Macdonald read Trainspotting on a plane in December 1993 and thought it would make a good basis for a film. Ewan McGregor was cast as Renton, while Ewen Bremner, who played Renton in the novel's stage adaptation, was cast as Spud. In preparation for the role, McGregor lost 2 stone (12.7 kilograms) and shaved his head. He also learned how to cook up heroin in order to better understand the character.

== Reception ==
McGregor's performance as Renton was well received, and it launched his career into much bigger roles. In his review for the Los Angeles Times, Kenneth Turan wrote, "in McGregor ... the film has an actor whose magnetism monopolizes our attention no matter what". Screenonline praised Renton's "sarcastic narration" and noted the film's message of "choosing life". McGregor's sardonic performance was similarly praised by Vice, and McGregor won several awards for his portrayal.
