= Garry Anthony Fraser =

Film director and producer

Garry Anthony Fraser is a Scottish BAFTA-award winning film director and producer. He made his directorial debut with an autobiographical film titled Everybody's Child, which explored his struggles with poverty and drug addiction. Following this success, Fraser worked as a director for the second unit during the production of T2 Trainspotting and both created and directed the TV drama The Grey Area.
