= Men in Love (novel) =

2025 novel by Irvine Welsh

Men In Love
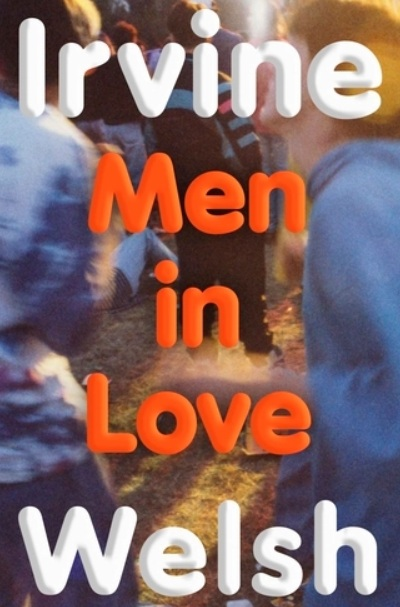
- Author: Irvine Welsh
- Language: English
- Publisher: Jonathan Cape (UK); W. W. Norton (US)
- Publication date: 24 July 2025 (UK)
- Publication place: Scotland
- Media type: Print
- ISBN: 978-1-78733-575-2
- Preceded by: Resolution

Men In Love is a 2025 novel by Scottish writer Irvine Welsh. It is a sequel to his 1993 novel Trainspotting, but set before its 2002 sequel Porno. It follows the lives of characters Renton, Begbie, Spud and Sick Boy immediately after the events of Trainspotting.

== Reception ==
Mike Cormack gave the book a negative review in The Spectator, saying, "The impression one gets from Men In Love is that of Fat Elvis, sweating and unknowingly self-parodic in Las Vegas. Welsh desperately needs an editor with the guts to tell him this schtick isn’t working any more."

The Guardian gave a mediocre review, saying "There are plenty of moments that showcase Welsh at his best, impertinent and loose and attuned to the poetic cadence of everyday speech. When his writing hits these heights, most often during flights of knowing, referential, rhetorical fancy, it is hard not to be charmed by its flair and insolence" but adding, "it is hard to shake the feeling that we are in desperate, desperate need of a new story altogether."

The Irish Independent was more positive, saying "Readers expecting Trainspotting’s breakneck pace and madcap depravity may be thrown by the reflective, even tender, tone here. But for those willing to engage with messier, slower, more ambivalent truths, Men in Love offers a deeply affecting study of emotional survival.".
