= Dead Men's Trousers =

2018 novel by Irvine Welsh

- First edition
- Author: Irvine Welsh
- Language: English
- Genre: Fiction
- Published: 2018 (Jonathan Cape)
- Publication place: United Kingdom
- ISBN: 9781787330771
- Preceded by: The Blade Artist

Dead Men's Trousers is a 2018 novel by Scottish writer Irvine Welsh. It is a sequel to his earlier books Trainspotting, Porno, Skagboys and The Blade Artist. Set in 2015, it follows the characters Renton, Sick Boy, Spud and Begbie as they meet up again as middle-aged men.

== Reception ==
In a positive assessment for The Guardian, Sam Leith commented that "if you go for Welsh's stuff, as I do, you'll go for Dead Men's Trousers with great enthusiasm". Meanwhile, a review in The Scotsman described the novel as "juvenile, Dad-dancing tripe". Similarly, Jason Sheehan at NPR suggested that the plot was "messy". He added that "by the end, what could've been a fitting, apt, even startling counterweight to Trainspotting has been weighed down with so much awkward sex, so many grown men on drugs and so many antic, unlikely capers, that the great idea Welsh had at the beginning has been lost".
