= The Blade Artist =

2016 novel by Irvine Welsh

- cover of first edition
- Author: Irvine Welsh
- Language: English
- Genre: Novel
- Publisher: Jonathan Cape
- Publication date: 7 April 2016
- Publication place: United Kingdom
- Pages: 288
- ISBN: 978-0-224-10215-5
- OCLC: 946602506
- Preceded by: A Decent Ride
- Followed by: Dead Men's Trousers

The Blade Artist is a 2016 novel by Scottish writer Irvine Welsh. The story follows on from Welsh's previous novels, Trainspotting and Porno, catching up with Begbie's past and present.

== Synopsis ==
Begbie, a violent thug and principal antagonist of Welsh's prior books, is now going by the name of Jim Francis, living and working as an artist in California. He returns to Scotland to attend the funeral of his murdered son. His wife Melanie slowly comes to terms with Jim's dark past.

== Critical reception ==
The novel received mostly good reviews. In The Daily Telegraph, Orlando Bird called it "lean, clever and propulsive". Hannah McGill of The Scotsman commended Welsh's perceptive description of the "divisions that rend families, and the minor lies and delusions that sustain relationships"

In the Oxonian Review, Callum Seddon suggested the novel was "a take on the established trope of 'the double' in Scottish literature". Meanwhile, Sunil Badami of The Australian assessed that the novel was "lean and purposeful", and a quick read. In a more mixed notice, Erik Martiny of The London Magazine called it a "resourceful, engagingly lively novel", but stressed that its "main interest derives less from its detective novel scenario than from Welsh's ability to explore his protagonist's inner struggle to contain the beast within."

In a negative review for The Guardian, Sarah Ditum suggested the characters were "unconvincing". She added, "As detective fiction it's shakily assembled, as a horror novel it can't outpace cinematic torture porn, and as social realism it routinely sends its own plausibility up in smoke."

== Adaptation ==
In December 2021, Robert Carlyle confirmed that he would be reprising the role of Begbie from the film adaptations of Trainspotting and Porno in a TV miniseries based on The Blade Artist. In 2025, Carlyle confirmed that the first script had been written, saying "It's baby steps, but we're getting there"
