= The Sex Lives of Siamese Twins =

2014 novel by Irvine Welsh

- First edition
- Author: Irvine Welsh
- Language: English
- Published: 2014 (Jonathan Cape)
- Publication place: Scotland
- Media type: Print (Hardcover)
- Pages: 468
- ISBN: 978-022408788-9

The Sex Lives of Siamese Twins is the ninth novel by Scottish writer Irvine Welsh, published in May 2014.

== Plot summary ==
The novel follows Lucy Brennan, a sadistic personal trainer in Miami, Florida. When Lucy leaves a failed romantic evening, she gets caught in a chase between a gunman and two fleeing homeless victims. Lucy knocks the gunman to the ground, allowing the victims to escape.

The incident is recorded by Lena Sorenson, an overweight, self-conscious, successful sculptor. Sorenson’s video turns Lucy into a media sensation. The news competes for airtime with a story about conjoined twins Anabelle and Amy, who debate undergoing a risky separation operation to allow Anabelle to have sex with her boyfriend.

It is revealed that the two men who Lucy saved them from the angry gunman are pedophiles and the gunman a victim intent on revenge. The media turns on Lucy.

Following the incident, Lena tracks Lucy down to schedule a personal training session. In turn, Lena becomes obsessed with Lucy's weight loss. When Lena fails to follow Lucy's diet regime, Lucy drugs her and locks her in an abandoned apartment complex, chaining her to a pillar and forcing her to urinate in a bucket. Lucy's abusive tactics prove successful, and Lena loses weight.

== Reception ==
Similarities have been drawn between this book and Welsh's first novel, Trainspotting. Elena Seymenliyska of The Daily Telegraph wrote, "It's a bit like his debut, Trainspotting (1993), only instead of the tenements of Leith, we're in the condos of Miami Beach. And in place of heroin addicts, alcoholics and violent psychos, here we have fitness instructors, poseurs – and violent psychos."

In The Guardian, Sandra Newman took issue with the lead character: "The pleasure of the book is spoiled by a radically misjudged narrator."

In The Independent, David Pollock wrote that the author's risk ultimately paid off: "Yet how far he has removed himself from his comfort zone in writing female Americans is validated by the clarity with which he eviscerates Western society's great—and potentially most dangerous—obsessions with food, health, sex and emotional perfection."
