= The Bedroom Secrets of the Master Chefs =

2006 novel by Irvine Welsh

- Author: Irvine Welsh
- Language: English, Scots
- Genre: Novel
- Publisher: Jonathan Cape
- Publication date: 2006
- Publication place: Scotland
- Media type: Print (Hardback & Paperback)
- Pages: 392 pp
- ISBN: 0-224-07587-X
- OCLC: 59877528

The Bedroom Secrets of the Master Chefs is the sixth novel by Scottish writer Irvine Welsh.

It has been compared with Oscar Wilde's The Picture of Dorian Gray and Robert Louis Stevenson's The Strange Case of Dr Jekyll and Mr Hyde.

== Plot summary ==
Danny Skinner and Brian Kibby both work for Edinburgh's restaurant-inspection team as environmental health officers.

Skinner is a hard-drinking man, who is involved in football hooliganism and supports local team Hibernian F.C. He is reading a book by Edinburgh chef Alan de Fretais called The Bedroom Secrets of the Master Chefs. He conceives a strong dislike for Kibby and bullies and undermines him mercilessly at work. He relaxes by reading Hugh MacDiarmid, Rimbaud, Verlaine and Schopenhauer, and watching Federico Fellini films.

Kibby is shy and inward-looking, and drinks Horlicks, collects model trains, and obsessively plays a computer game called Harvest Moon. Kibby's social life revolves around a hillwalking group called the Hyp Hykers and attendance at Star Trek conventions.

The plot describes Skinner's relationship with alcohol and his search for his unknown father. His alcoholism causes him to lose his girlfriend Kay. Gradually it dawns on him that the damage that ought to accrue to his body from his lifestyle is instead inflicted on Kibby. For a while he enjoys this, particularly relishing his promotion at work, but when Kibby becomes mortally ill he realises that he needs him. When Kibby comes out of hospital after a liver transplant (caused vicariously by Skinner's heavy drinking), they both realise that their dependency is mutual.

Kibby (who has retired on health grounds) puts on weight and becomes a heavy drinker in his own right. Skinner resigns and goes to San Francisco in search of someone who might be his father. He is disappointed in this as it turns out the man was exclusively homosexual during the period in question, but does find love at an Alcoholics Anonymous meeting, in the shape of American Dorothy Cominsky.

Skinner returns to Leith where he continues the search for his father and starts a relationship with Kibby's sister. When he discovers de Fretais having sex with Kay, he tries to kill them both, succeeding in killing the chef and gravely injuring his ex-girlfriend. By the end of the story Kibby is strongly implied to be Skinner's half brother, with Brian's father, Keith Kibby being the man for whom Skinner had been searching. Skinner knows this with reasonable certainty, as he dies at Brian's hand.

== Themes ==
The book marks a departure for Welsh in that, although ecstasy, cannabis and cocaine are mentioned in passing, there is little reference to the dance club scene of most of his other work. On the contrary, it is alcohol abuse which punctuates the novel, along with the themes of personal identity (touched upon in Marabou Stork Nightmares) and romantic love (The Undefeated, from Ecstasy).

The story is told against the backdrop of the 2004 U.S. elections and the war in Iraq.

Skinner's mother is a former punk fan, and although the question of her son's paternity is as good as answered by the end of the book, a possibility remains that Joe Strummer, the late Clash singer, could also have been a candidate.
