= Filth (film) =

2013 film by Jon S. Baird

- Theatrical release poster
- Directed by: Jon S. Baird
- Screenplay by: Jon S. Baird
- Based on: Filth by Irvine Welsh
- Produced by: Ken Marshall; Jon S. Baird; Trudie Styler; Jens Meurer; Christian Angermayer; Celine Rattray; Mark Amin; Stephen Mao; Steven Istock; Will Clarke; James McAvoy
- Starring: James McAvoy; Jamie Bell; Joanne Froggatt; Imogen Poots; Eddie Marsan; Jim Broadbent
- Cinematography: Matthew Jensen
- Edited by: Mark Eckersley
- Music by: Clint Mansell
- Production companies: Film House Germany; Maven Pictures; Logie Pictures; Steel Mill Pictures; Creative Scotland; Film i Väst; Studio Mao; Altitude Film Entertainment
- Distributed by: Lionsgate (United Kingdom); Ascot Elite Entertainment Group (Germany); Noble Entertainment (Sweden); Magnet Releasing (United States)
- Release dates: 16 September 2013 (Old Town Taito International Comedy Film Festival); 4 October 2013 (United Kingdom); 17 October 2013 (Germany); 30 May 2014 (United States)
- Running time: 97 minutes
- Countries: Belgium; United Kingdom; Germany; Sweden; United States
- Language: English
- Box office: $9.1 million

Filth is a 2013 psychological black comedy crime thriller film written and directed by Jon S. Baird, based on Irvine Welsh's 1998 novel Filth. The film was released on 27 September 2013 in Scotland, 4 October 2013 elsewhere in the United Kingdom and in Ireland, and on 30 May 2014 in the United States. It stars James McAvoy, Jamie Bell, and Jim Broadbent.

Filth marked the final film role of David Soul, in a cameo role before his death in 2024.

Set in Edinburgh, the film follows a misanthropic detective investigating a murder case, beset with mental health problems following the end of his marriage. He has bipolar disorder, feelings of guilt over the death of his brother and (eventually) suicidal ideation.

== Plot ==
Bruce Robertson, a detective sergeant in Edinburgh, is a scheming, manipulative and misanthropic bully who spends his free time indulging in drugs, alcohol, abusive sexual relationships, and "the games" – his euphemism for vindictive plots he hatches to cause trouble for people he dislikes, including many of his colleagues in the Lothian and Borders Police.

Bruce also delights in bullying and taking advantage of his mild-mannered friend Clifford Blades, a member of Bruce's masonic lodge, whose wife, Bunty, is the target of his repeated obscene phone calls. He only shows genuine warmth to Mary and her young son, the widowed wife and child of a man whom he tries and fails to resuscitate after he suffers a heart attack in the street.

As the story begins, Bruce's main goal is to gain a promotion to become Detective Inspector (DI), the path to which appears to open when he is assigned to oversee the investigation into the murder of a Japanese exchange student. However, Bruce slowly loses his grip on reality as he works the case and has more and more vivid hallucinations.

It is ultimately revealed through dream-like exchanges with Dr. Rossi, Bruce's psychiatrist, that he is on medication for bipolar disorder and has repressed immense feelings of guilt over a childhood accident that led to the death of his younger brother. Additionally, Bruce's wife, Carole, has recently left him and is denying him access to his daughter, Stacey.

These domestic issues have not only sparked his desperate bid for promotion, but played a part in his unusual displays of kindness toward Mary and her son. They have also led him to begin cross-dressing as his wife while off duty, in order to "keep her close" to him.

While wandering the streets cross-dressed, Bruce is kidnapped by a street gang led by the thuggish Gorman (who are responsible for the murder of the Japanese student) and is left badly beaten. However, he manages to kill Gorman by throwing him through a window and is found by his colleagues. Bruce not only misses out on the promotion as a result of the events, but is in fact demoted to Constable and is reassigned to uniform, while his friend and rookie Ray Lennox is promoted to Detective Inspector.

Afterwards, Blades receives a tape of Bruce apologising. Bruce then prepares to take his own life by hanging, but is interrupted at the last moment by Mary and her son knocking at his front door. He then breaks the fourth wall and addresses the audience, repeating his catchphrase "same rules apply" and laughing as the chair slips from under him.

== Cast ==
- James McAvoy as Bruce "Robbo" Robertson
- Jamie Bell as Ray Lennox
- Eddie Marsan as Clifford Blades
- Imogen Poots as Amanda Drummond
- Brian McCardie as Dougie Gillman
- Emun Elliott as Peter Inglis
- Gary Lewis as Gus Bain
- John Sessions as Bob Toal
- Shauna Macdonald as Carole Robertson
- Jim Broadbent as Dr. Verme Rossi
- Joanne Froggatt as Mary
- Kate Dickie as Chrissie Gillman
- Martin Compston as Graeme Gorman
- Iain De Caestecker as Ocky
- Shirley Henderson as Bunty Blades
- Joy McAvoy as Estelle
- Jordan Young as Lexo
- Pollyanna McIntosh as Karen
- Bobby Rainsbury as Stephanie
- Zack Niizato as Japanese Student
- Therese Bradley as Madame Maisie
- Robin Laing as Rent Boy
- Franziska Altmeyer as Hamburg Carole
- Ron Donachie as Hector
- Tracy-Ann Oberman as Diana
- Mitchell Mullen as Bobby
- Jake Wilson as Davie Robertson
- Luke MacDonald as Euan
- David Soul as Punter
- Natasha O'Keeffe as Anna
- Chidi Chickwe as Steven
- Sanjeev Kohli as Sunil
- Neil D'Souza as Anil
- Trudie Styler as Madame R Zen Ficken
- Megan Finn as Stacey Robertson

== Production ==
Welsh's novel was published in 1998, but over the following years the project was passed between producers and acquired a reputation of being "un-filmable".

== Music ==
=== Track listing ===
No.	Title	Artist(s)	Length
1.	"Robbo's Theme"	Clint Mansell	1:14
2.	"Will You Still Love Me Tomorrow"	The Shirelles	0:17
3.	"Love Really Hurts Without You"	Billy Ocean	2:42
4.	"Silver Lady"	David Soul	3:00
5.	"It's All Over Me"	Otis Blackwell	3:43
6.	"Born To Be Wild"	Wilson Pickett	2:44
7.	"Supermarket Emptiness"	Clint Mansell	0:37
8.	"Creep"	Clint Mansell & Coco Sumner	2:07
9.	"Dr Love"	Tom Jones	4:12
10.	"Mercy"	The Third Degree	1:51
11.	"Backdoor Santa"	Clarence Carter	3:20
Total length:			25:47

Other notable pieces include

- Symphony No. 5 in C Minor, Op. 67: I. Allegro con brio
- "Libiamo Ne'lieti Calici (Brindisi)
- Sandstorm
- Mr. Vain
- Theme from Elvira Madigan
- Les noces de Figaro, K. 492: Ouverture
- La donna è mobile

== Reception ==
=== Box office ===
The film earned £250,000 in the box office revenue during its opening weekend in Scotland, reaching number one in the charts. It grossed £842,167 ($1.4m) in the following weekend, when it went on general release throughout the United Kingdom. The film ultimately ended up grossing $9.1 million worldwide.

=== Critical response ===
On the review aggregator website Rotten Tomatoes, 66% of 95 critics' reviews are positive, with an average rating of 6.2/10. The website's consensus reads: "Warped, grimy, and enthusiastically unpleasant, Filth lives up to its title splendidly." Metacritic, which uses a weighted average, assigned the film a score of 56 out of 100, based on 24 critics, indicating "mixed or average" reviews.

Damon Wise's 2013 review for Empire rated the film four stars out of five, praising Baird's "steady hand on the throttle" and McAvoy's "delirious, demonic performance."

Peter Bradshaw was less enthused in his review for The Guardian, calling it "a bizarre, dyspeptic vomit of despair in a violent world where everyone in the lineup is Begbie." However, Bradshaw notes the film is appropriately (for Welsh's work) unsubtle, and praises performances by Eddie Marsan and John Sessions.

=== Accolades ===
The film earned McAvoy several awards, including best actor at the British Independent Film Awards 2013 and Scottish BAFTAs 2014. Jon Baird was a nominee at the same ceremonies in directing categories.
