= Trainspotting (musical) =

2026 musical by Stephen McGuinness, Irvine Welsh

- The Musical
- Poster for the West End production
- Music: Stephen McGuinness; Irvine Welsh
- Lyrics: Stephen McGuinness; Irvine Welsh
- Book: Irvine Welsh
- Basis: Novel Trainspotting by Irvine Welsh
- Premiere: 22 July 2026: Theatre Royal Haymarket
- Productions: 2026 West End

Trainspotting The Musical is a stage musical written by Irvine Welsh with music and lyrics by Stephen McGuinness and Welsh and developed and directed by Caroline Jay Ranger. Based on Welsh's novel of the same name and its film adaptation.

== Production history ==
=== West End (2026) ===
The musical had its world premiere at the Theatre Royal Haymarket in London's West End beginning previews on 15 July 2026 and an opening night of 22 July 2026, running until 5 September. Caroline Jay Ranger directed and it starred Lewis Kidd as Renton. Full casting was announced on 11 May 2026.

Following the West End run, the musical was planned to tour the UK, however on 3 August 2026 it was announced that the tour had been cancelled due to the negative reviews and low ticket sales.

== Cast and characters ==
Character	West End
Character	2026
Renton	Lewis Kidd
Sick Boy	Sheridan Townsley
Spud	Kieran Andrew
Begbie	Frankie O’Connor
Tommy	Finlay Paul
Cathy Renton	Rebecca McKinnis
Davie Renton	Gordon Cooper
Colleen	Ashley J Russell
Alison	Rosie Dignan
Kelly	Yana Harris
Lizzie	Sophie Hutchinson

== Critical reception ==
The production received strongly negative reviews, being almost universally panned by critics, with The Spectator remarking that it had been "mocked [by] plenty of critics". The score was described as "diluted" by The Telegraph, "pointless" by The Stage, and "instantly forgettable" by The New York Times; the script was called "disconnected" by The Guardian and "coruscatingly fragmentary" by The Standard; and the visual design was criticised as "boxy" by London Theatre and "ill-conceived" by WhatsOnStage.com. However, the performance of the cast was noted as a highlight by The Financial Times and The Independent, both of whom otherwise gave negative reviews. The extension of the Trainspotting franchise was criticised by The Guardian as "mutant", with Metro also stating that "just because a story can keep mutating doesn't mean it should".
