= A Decent Ride =

2015 novel by Irvine Welsh

- First edition
- Author: Irvine Welsh
- Language: English
- Genre: Novel
- Publisher: Jonathan Cape – Vintage
- Publication date: 16 April 2015
- Publication place: Scotland
- Pages: 288
- ISBN: 978-0-224-10217-9
- Preceded by: Porno

A Decent Ride is a 2015 novel by Irvine Welsh. Welsh returns to his character Terry Lawson, first introduced in Glue, this book taking place a further 10 years after the events of Porno during the 2011 Scottish Hurricane Bawbag. The book's title is a double-entendre on Lawson's sexual prowess, and his job in this novel as a taxi driver.

== Synopsis ==
Terry Lawson, having met writers through giving them lifts during the Edinburgh Festival, decides that a literary education will aid him in his relentless sexual escapades and help him overcome his own loss of virility. He also meets Wee Jonty—a well-endowed, nice-but-dim character, similar to Porno's Curtis—whose girlfriend Jinty Magdalen has gone missing. Lawson agrees to help track her down, his "investigations" making him question the motivations of a prominent American businessman and TV star Ronald Checker (a pastiche of Donald Trump) and his role in Jinty's disappearance. The book's narration alternates between Lawson, Jonty and Checker.

== Ronald Checker/Donald Trump ==
The Financial Times identified the Checker character as "a Donald Trump-esque tycoon, with a grand, possibly devious, business plan.". Welsh himself told The Washington Post that Checker was "a youthful, punkish version of Donald Trump", though the paper reflected that "as obnoxious as this character [Checker] is, he doesn’t come close to his real-world model [Trump]" Trump was prominent in Scotland at the time the novel was set, developing an environmentally controversial golf course and publicly supporting Scottish Government policies (a theme within the book) while it suited his business needs, before falling out with Alex Salmond over his support for wind turbines. The novel also imagines and implies Trump's sexual proclivities. When challenged later on his opinions of Trump, Welsh stated that Checker was "a generic kind of demagogue" but that subsequent to the novel's release that "Trump...since he lost Iowa, has become more interesting. He's like some kind of game show participant."

== Critical reception ==
The novel was reviewed in many newspapers. It received mixed reviews.

Welsh's own website chose to cite Claire Inman of Curious Animal Magazine, who felt that "Whether your interest is piqued by the ridiculously expensive bottles of whiskey and the extraordinary lengths an American will go to own them or your heart strings are pulled by Wee Jonty’s anguished love story, there’s a multitude of ideas and human emotions that Welsh brings out among the laughter.", and a review for The Spectator, in which James Walton suggested that "Irvine Welsh is not a writer who’s mellowing with age... Welsh’s [language is an] astonishingly supple invention: one that can combine scabrousness and lyricism, comedy and ruefulness in the same paragraph... [if] you fancy an authentic and often thrilling blast of full-strength Irvine Welsh, then you’re in for a treat."

However, in a review titled "Poor Writing and Penis Jokes" Stuart Kelly wrote that he "could have spent this entire review analysing Welsh’s sexual politics – but what would be the point? The tired old rebuttal is 'it’s a satire and you don’t have a sense of humour'. But listen. What’s that? It’s the sound of no one laughing. There is a faint and distant sniggering, though. If anyone parts with £12.99 for this, they’re being taken for a ride."
