= If You Liked School You'll Love Work =

2007 collection of short stories by Irvine Welsh

- Author: Irvine Welsh
- Language: English, Scots
- Genre: Short stories
- Publisher: Jonathan Cape
- Publication date: July 2007
- Publication place: Scotland
- Media type: Print (hardback & paperback)
- Pages: 320 pp
- ISBN: 0-393-33077-X
- OCLC: 122974241
- Dewey Decimal: 823/.914 22
- LC Class: PR6073.E47 I35 2007

If You Liked School You'll Love Work is a collection of short stories by novelist Irvine Welsh. It was released in the UK on 5 July 2007, and in the U.S. on 4 September 2007.

== Stories ==
- "Rattlesnakes"—Three young Americans find themselves in dire circumstances in the desert, when one of them receives a snakebite on the genitals.
- "If You Liked School You'll Love Work..."—Expatriate English publican juggles business, family and women, on the Canary Islands.
- "The DOGS of Lincoln Park"—American yuppies and a Korean chef collide.
- "Miss Arizona"—Struggling independent filmmaker follows in the footsteps of his hero, only to find himself much closer than he imagined.
- "Kingdom of Fife"—Scottish Subbuteo player and ex-jockey Jason King seeks love and destiny amid a background of corruption and loss in this novella.
