= Marabou Stork Nightmares =

1995 novel by Irvine Welsh

- First edition (UK)
- Author: Irvine Welsh
- Language: English, Scots
- Publisher: Jonathan Cape (UK); W. W. Norton (US)
- Publication date: 1995 (UK), 1996 (US)
- Publication place: Scotland
- Media type: Print (hardback & paperback)
- Pages: 264 pp
- ISBN: 0-393-31563-0
- OCLC: 36429347
- Preceded by: Trainspotting
- Followed by: Filth

Marabou Stork Nightmares is an experimental novel by Irvine Welsh, and his second novel, published in the UK in 1995.

The book's narrative is split into two styles: a conventional first-person account of the past and a more surreal, stream-of-consciousness account of an otherworldly present. Like many of Welsh's novels, it is written in Edinburgh Scots dialect. The plot consists of the memories and hallucinations of the protagonist, Roy Strang, making him an extreme example of an unreliable narrator.

== Plot summary ==
Roy Strang narrates the book from an (at first) unexplained coma, which he has been in for the previous two years. His life in this state is a miserable affair, surrounded by uncaring doctors and his extremely dysfunctional family. In his fantasy life, he is an adventurer in the wilds of South Africa, where he and his loyal guide, Sandy Jamieson, hunt for the marabou stork.

When not hallucinating, Strang tells his life story, beginning in a "scheme" (local authority housing) in Muirhouse, Scotland, with his violent, delusional parents, two half-brothers (one a womanizer, the other flamboyantly gay), and his promiscuous sister, all of whom he despises. When Strang is 12, he and his family relocate to apartheid-era South Africa, where he is repeatedly molested by his uncle. After his father is jailed for the violent assault of a taxi driver and his uncle is killed in a terrorist bombing, the Strangs are forced to return to Scotland, a mere 18 months after they left.

Strang grows into a violent, misogynistic thug. He maintains a full-time job as a systems analyst for the fictional investment group, "Scottish Spinsters" (a reference to Scottish Widows). He joins a gang of football hooligans who are attached to Hibernian F.C., the Capital City Service, and led by the fearsome Lexo. Strang enjoys his life as a "top boy," feared by the entire town, until the gang kidnaps a young woman who rejected their advances and gang rapes her; Strang is horrified but also takes an active part in her rape, justifying it to himself by contemplating how the gang would turn on him if he didn't.

The gang evades prison, but Strang is stricken with guilt and withdraws completely into depression. He briefly revives a few months later when he meets a woman and genuinely feels love for the first time. Around the same time he begins to take ecstasy, and befriends his gay half-brother. His happiness is short-lived, however; the memory of what he has done continues to haunt him, and his depression soon completely engulfs him, taking him away from his lover and his drug-driven escapism. He attempts suicide by asphyxiation, but survives, putting him in a coma.

One day, the gang's rape victim visits him in hospital. She tells him that she has been murdering her rapists one by one, and now she has come for him, revealing that he was by far the most brutal. She then cuts off his penis and stabs him to death. In his final moments, Strang realizes that the only person he has ever really hated is himself, and makes peace with everyone he has wronged and who has wronged him.

The novel's other, more stream-of-consciousness narrative, intertwined with the story of Strang's past, takes place in the fantasy world he creates for himself in the coma. At first a bizarre but rousing adventure, it gradually becomes darker as Strang reveals the uglier parts of his life and personality, involving surreal images of brutality and sexual violence.

== Reception ==
Boyd Tonkin at The Observer praises Welsh for the power of his fiction and writes: "Here was a voice, out of Edinburgh by way of Hades, that would never have a problem with energy, wit or compassion. Finding the right form for all this incendiary talent might prove trickier." Tonkin suggests that Welsh does not know what to do with his fatalism, but that the story "gives a shockingly funny shape to that impasse".

== Analysis ==
As in many of Welsh's novels, there are many allusions to music and underground youth culture, especially rave culture, punk rock, comic books, and football hooliganism.

There is a strong message against violence towards women from men in the book; one passage is in fact set out in a capital "Z", which is the symbol for Zero Tolerance, a women's rights group based in Scotland.

The South African narrative is written in a Boys' Own style.

The sociopathic Francis Begbie, one of the main characters in Trainspotting, makes a cameo appearance.
