= T2 Trainspotting =

2017 British film by Danny Boyle

- Theatrical release poster
- Directed by: Danny Boyle
- Screenplay by: John Hodge
- Based on: Characters by Irvine Welsh
- Produced by: Bernard Bellew; Danny Boyle; Christian Colson; Andrew Macdonald
- Starring: Ewan McGregor; Ewen Bremner; Jonny Lee Miller; Robert Carlyle; Kelly Macdonald
- Cinematography: Anthony Dod Mantle
- Edited by: Jon Harris
- Music by: Rick Smith
- Production companies: Film4; Creative Scotland; Cloud Eight Films; DNA Films; Decibel Films
- Distributed by: TriStar Pictures (through Sony Pictures Releasing)
- Release dates: 22 January 2017 (Edinburgh); 27 January 2017 (United Kingdom)
- Running time: 117 minutes
- Countries: United Kingdom; United States
- Language: English
- Budget: $18 million
- Box office: $42.1 million

T2 Trainspotting is a 2017 black comedy drama film co-produced and directed by Danny Boyle and written by John Hodge. Set in and around Edinburgh, Scotland, it is based on characters created by Irvine Welsh in his 1993 novel Trainspotting and its 2002 follow-up Porno. A sequel to Boyle's 1996 film Trainspotting, T2 stars the original ensemble cast, including leads Ewan McGregor, Ewen Bremner, Jonny Lee Miller, and Robert Carlyle, with Shirley Henderson, James Cosmo, and Kelly Macdonald. The film features a new character, Veronika, played by Anjela Nedyalkova, and includes clips, music, and archive sound from the first film.

T2 Trainspotting was released in the United Kingdom on 27 January 2017, and worldwide throughout February and March 2017 by Sony Pictures Releasing through its TriStar Pictures label. It received generally positive reviews from critics and was a modest commercial success, grossing $42.1 million against a production budget of $18 million.

== Plot ==
Now living in Amsterdam, 46-year-old Mark Renton suffers a heart attack in a gym. Though two decades sober from heroin, he is now undergoing divorce and facing imminent redundancy. He decides to take a nostalgic trip back to Edinburgh. Daniel "Spud" Murphy has returned to a cycle of heroin addiction after separating from his wife, Gail, and losing custody of his teenage son Fergus, born after Renton had left. Simon "Sick Boy" Williamson has stopped using heroin but abuses cocaine, engages in blackmail schemes with his Bulgarian girlfriend, Veronika, and runs a failing pub that he inherited.

Renton visits Spud in his flat on the 13th floor of a high-rise just in time to save him from a suicide attempt. Spud is initially angry, but Renton offers to help him overcome his addiction. Renton next visits Sick Boy, who, after a seemingly friendly conversation in which Renton gives the impression his life in Amsterdam is going well, attacks him, still furious from being ripped off. Veronika's intervention saves Renton, who then produces a package, giving Sick Boy back his original share of the money. Unimpressed, Sick Boy plans to take revenge.

While serving a prison sentence, Francis "Franco" Begbie escapes and returns to his estranged wife June's flat, meeting his college-bound son, Frank Jr., whom he forces to join him in burgling houses. He visits Sick Boy, who pretends to have heard of Renton living in Amsterdam and promises to provide Begbie with a false passport so he can travel to the Netherlands to exact revenge.

Renton, Sick Boy, and Veronika fraudulently apply for a £100,000 EU business development grant to turn the pub's upper floor into another business venture: a brothel disguised as a sauna. Veronika and Renton soon begin an affair. Meanwhile, Spud joins the renovation, and Veronika inspires him to write his memoirs. One of Sick Boy's blackmail targets reports him to the police. The proceeds of their crimes are used up in legal fees and Sick Boy's cocaine addiction. Renton escapes from Begbie after a chance encounter at a nightclub. Doyle, owner of a rival brothel, kidnaps Renton and Sick Boy, drives them to the countryside, and intimidates them into abandoning their scheme, leaving them to walk back to Edinburgh naked.

Begbie visits Spud and, reading his memoirs, discovers that Renton left Spud his share of the money. Veronika arrives, and Begbie steals her phone, with which he sends messages to Renton and Sick Boy pretending to be her and asking them to come to the pub at midnight. Veronika asks Spud to leave with her, promising him half of the £100,000. Spud fears that he will spend it on heroin again, so she offers to give his share to Gail and Fergus. He helps transfer the money to Veronika's account by forging Renton's and Sick Boy's signatures. After reading another excerpt of Spud's writings about their encounter with Begbie's alcoholic father, Begbie visits June's flat for the last time, apologising to Frank Jr. for his abuse and giving him words of encouragement.

Spud arrives too late at the pub to warn his friends of Begbie's plot. Begbie knocks Sick Boy unconscious and chases Renton across the upstairs floor. He throws Renton through the floorboards, leaving him hanging by the neck from electrical wiring; Begbie tries to strangle him, but Sick Boy douses him with pepper spray and saves Renton. Begbie pulls out a sawn-off shotgun and tries to kill them both, but Spud takes a disconnected toilet and bashes Begbie in the head with it.

They dump Begbie in the boot of Sick Boy's car outside the prison. Veronika returns to her son in Bulgaria. Spud puts together his book of memoirs and mends his relationship with Fergus and Gail, who says she has thought of a title. Renton and Sick Boy resume their old friendship. Renton moves back into his now-widowed father's home and embraces him in reconciliation before going to his bedroom and dancing to a remix of "Lust for Life".

== Cast ==
- Ewan McGregor as Mark "Rent Boy" Renton
  - Hamish Haggerty as young Renton
  - Ben Skelton as 9-year-old Renton
  - Connor McIndoe as 20-year-old Renton
- Ewen Bremner as Daniel "Spud" Murphy
  - Aiden Haggarty as 9-year-old Spud
  - John Bell as 20-year-old Spud
- Jonny Lee Miller as Simon "Sick Boy" Williamson
  - Logan Gillies as 9-year-old Simon
  - James McElvar as 20-year-old Simon
- Robert Carlyle as Francis "Franco" Begbie
  - Daniel Jackson as young Begbie
  - Daniel Smith as 9-year-old Begbie
  - Christopher Mullen as 20-year-old Begbie
- Kelly Macdonald as Diane Coulston
- Shirley Henderson as Gail Houston
- James Cosmo as Davie Renton, Mark's father
- Anjela Nedyalkova as Veronika Kovach
- Steven Robertson as Stoddart, Begbie's lawyer
- Elek Kish as Dozo
- Simon Weir as Jailhoose
- Bradley Welsh as Mr Doyle
- Pauline Turner as June Begbie
- Kyle Fitzpatrick as Fergus Murphy
  - Charlie Hardie as 9-year-old Fergus
- Scot Greenan as Franco Begbie Jr.
- Katie Leung as Nurse
- Michael Shaw as 20-year-old Tommy
- Elijah Wolf as 9-year-old Tommy

Archival footage included Eileen Nicholas as Mrs Renton and Kevin McKidd as Tommy MacKenzie from the first film. McGregor, Bremner, Miller and Carlyle also appear in footage from the original Trainspotting film. The author of Trainspotting, Irvine Welsh, appears near the middle of the film as Mikey Forrester, reprising his role from the first film. Carlyle also plays Begbie's father, the briefly seen wino in the Leith Railway Station.

== Production ==
In 2007, Danny Boyle declared his wish to make a sequel to his 1996 film Trainspotting which would take place nine years after the original film, based on Irvine Welsh's sequel Porno. He was waiting until the original cast aged visibly enough to portray the characters again. "I want them to look ravaged by the passing of time," Boyle explained. Having previously expressed doubts about a sequel, Ewan McGregor said in a 2013 interview that he would return for a sequel, saying, "I'm totally up for it. I'd be so chuffed to be back on set with everybody and I think it would be an extraordinary experience."

In March 2013, Boyle said the sequel would be only loosely based on Porno which he felt is "not a great book in the way that Trainspotting, the original novel, is genuinely a masterpiece". Boyle said that if the sequel were to happen, it would be for a 2016 release.

In May 2014, Welsh said that he had spent a week with Boyle, Andrew Macdonald and the creative team behind Trainspotting to discuss the sequel. Welsh said the meeting explored the story and script ideas. "We're not interested in doing something that will trash the legacy of Trainspotting. ... We want to do something that's very fresh and contemporary." That November, Welsh said that McGregor and Boyle had resolved differences and had held meetings about the film, saying "I know Danny and Ewan are back in touch with each other again. There are others in the cast who've had a rocky road, but now also reconciled. With the Trainspotting sequel the attention is going to be even more intense this time round because the first was such a great movie—and Danny's such a colossus now. We're all protective of the Trainspotting legacy and we want to make a film that adds to that legacy and doesn't take away from it."

In September 2015, Boyle stated his next film would be a sequel, tentatively titled Trainspotting 2. Later that month Boyle revealed that a script for the sequel had been written, and that filming would take place between May and June 2016. He hoped to release the film by the end of that year to commemorate Trainspotting's 20th anniversary.

While promoting Steve Jobs in November 2015, Boyle reiterated the hopes of beginning principal photography for the sequel in May and June 2016, and said that pre-production had begun in Edinburgh. Boyle also clarified that John Hodge wrote an original screenplay for the sequel, and that the film would not be a strict adaptation of Porno. An earlier script was reportedly written about 10 years prior, but was scrapped so that the original cast would agree to return for a film sequel. The working title for the sequel was T2.

In November 2015, Robert Carlyle said he would return as Begbie. According to Carlyle, he and the other Trainspotting cast members had already read Hodge's script, which was set 20 years after the original. Carlyle praised Hodge's screenplay and said that T2 "is going to be quite emotional for people. Because the film sort of tells you to think about yourself. You are going to be thinking: 'Fuck. What have I done with my life?'"

In early December 2015, it was announced that Sony's TriStar Pictures had acquired worldwide rights to the film and that the original lead cast would return.

=== Filming ===
Principal photography on the film began on 10 March 2016, in Edinburgh, according to Boyle. Filming wrapped in November 2016 Filming was previously scheduled to take place in May 2016.

=== Soundtrack ===
T2 Trainspotting (Original Motion Picture Soundtrack)

Soundtrack album by Various artists
- Released: 27 January 2017
- Length: 58:45
- Label: Polydor

The official soundtrack was released on 27 January 2017. It features Blondie, the Clash, Wolf Alice, High Contrast, the Prodigy, Queen, Run–D.M.C., Frankie Goes to Hollywood, Underworld, the Rubberbandits and Young Fathers.

No.	Title	Writer(s)	Producer(s)	Length
1.	"Lust for Life (The Prodigy Remix)" (Iggy Pop)	David Bowie; Pop	Bowie; Pop	5:00
2.	"Shotgun Mouthwash" (High Contrast)	Lincoln Barrett	Barrett; Rick Smith	2:54
3.	"Silk" (Wolf Alice)	Ellie Rowsell; Jonathan Oddie; Theodore Ellis; Joel Amey	Mike Crossey	4:05
4.	"Get Up" (Young Fathers)	Graham Hastings; Alloysious Massaquoi; Kayus Bankole; Tim Brinkhurst		3:50
5.	"Relax" (Frankie Goes to Hollywood)	Peter Gill; Holly Johnson; Mark O'Toole	Trevor Horn	3:57
6.	"Eventually But (Spud's Letter To Gail)" (Underworld and Ewen Bremner)	Smith; Karl Hyde	Smith	2:25
7.	"Only God Knows" (Young Fathers)	Bankole; Hastings; Massaquoi	Hastings; Dave Sitek	3:53
8.	"Dad's Best Friend" (The Rubberbandits)	Dave Chambers; Bob McGlynn	Blindboyboatclub	3:05
9.	"Dreaming" (Blondie)	Debbie Harry; Chris Stein	Michael Chapman; Richard Gottehrer	3:06
10.	"Radio Ga Ga" (Queen)	Roger Taylor	Queen; Mack	5:44
11.	"It's Like That" (Run-DMC vs. Jason Nevins)	Lawrence Smith; Joseph Ward Simmons; Darryl McDaniels	Simmons; Smith	4:10
12.	"(White Man) In Hammersmith Palais" (The Clash)	Paul Simonon; Topper Headon; Mick Jones; Joe Strummer	The Clash	4:01
13.	"Rain or Shine" (Young Fathers)	Hastings; Massaquoi; Bankole; Brinkhurst		3:51
14.	"Whitest Boy on the Beach" (Fat White Family)	Saul Adamczewski; Lias Saoudi	Adamczewski; Liam D. May	4:53
15.	"Slow Slippy" (Underworld)	Smith; Hyde	Smith	3:51
Total length:				58:45

== Release ==
T2 was released in the UK on 27 January 2017, followed by rolling worldwide releases from 10 February 2017. The film was given a limited release in the US on 17 March 2017, followed by a wider release on 31 March 2017 in a few major cities. T2 also screened out of competition at the 67th Berlin International Film Festival.

T2 Trainspotting grossed £17.1 million in the United Kingdom ($21.7 million). It grossed $2.4 million in the United States and Canada, and $18 million in other territories, for a worldwide gross of $42.1 million, against a production budget of $18 million.

=== Home media ===
T2: Trainspotting was released on Digital HD from Amazon Video and iTunes on 13 June 2017, by Sony Pictures Home Entertainment. The film was released on Ultra HD Blu-ray, Blu-ray and DVD on 27 June 2017.

== Reception ==
On review aggregator Rotten Tomatoes, the film holds an approval rating of 81% based on 250 reviews, with an average rating of 7/10. The website's critical consensus reads, "T2 Trainspotting adds an intoxicating, emotionally resonant postscript to its classic predecessor, even without fully recapturing the original's fresh, subversive thrill." On Metacritic, the film has a weighted average score of 67 out of 100, based on reviews from 42 critics, indicating "generally favorable reviews".

Robbie Collin of The Telegraph rated the film 3 out of 5 stars. Collin praised writer Hodge for refinding the voices of the characters, and called McGregor the dramatic linchpin of the film. Although the film doesn't match up to the first, Collin concludes "it's worthwhile on its own terms." Peter Bradshaw of The Guardian rated the film four stars out of five, saying it has "the same punchy energy, the same defiant pessimism" as the first film. Ann Hornaday of The Washington Post called the film a "respectable exercise in fan service".

=== Accolades ===
Award	Date of ceremony	Category	Recipients	Result
Golden Trailer Awards	6 June 2017	Best Trailerbyte for a Feature Film	T2 Trainspotting: "The Vault"	Nominated
Diversity in Media Awards	15 September 2017	Movie of the Year	T2 Trainspotting	Nominated
BAFTA Scotland Awards	November 5, 2017			
BAFTA Scotland Awards	November 5, 2017	Best Feature Film	T2 Trainspotting	Won
BAFTA Scotland Awards	November 5, 2017	Best Director (Fiction)	Danny Boyle	Won
BAFTA Scotland Awards	November 5, 2017	Best Actor in Film	Ewen Bremner	Won
BAFTA Scotland Awards	November 5, 2017	Best Actor in Film	Robert Carlyle	Nominated
BAFTA Scotland Awards	November 5, 2017	Best Actor in Film	Ewan McGregor	Nominated

== Future ==
In March 2017, Danny Boyle discussed the possibility of a third Trainspotting film, suggesting that it could be a spin-off centred on the character of Begbie, in a story based on the Irvine Welsh novel The Blade Artist. "I think [Robert Carlyle] would love to do that because it's an interesting twist on the character", Boyle said. "That may be made into a film. You couldn't call it T3 because, although some of the other characters come into it, they're only featured just momentarily. It's a solo story. You could call that a spin-off. [The Blade Artist] is a great read." Carlyle was likewise open to an adaptation of The Blade Artist. "We've been talking about that, I am up for doing it", he said at the T2 premiere in Edinburgh. "So maybe we ain't seen the end of Begbie just yet".

Boyle stated he would be more interested in directing a true sequel rather than a spin-off, preferring to work with all of the principal actors. "My affection is toward all four of them", Boyle said. "People regarded the first movie as being Renton's movie, and I never really saw it like that, though he does dominate because of the voice-over. I always saw it as an ensemble movie, so I'm still very much in that mode."

Irvine Welsh has also hinted that a Trainspotting television series is possible.

In December 2021, Carlyle confirmed that a Begbie spin-off series is in development.
