= Skagboys =

2012 novel by Irvine Welsh

- Author: Irvine Welsh
- Language: English
- Publisher: Jonathan Cape (UK); W. W. Norton (US)
- Publication date: 19 April 2012 (UK); 17 September 2012 (US)
- Publication place: Scotland
- Media type: Print
- ISBN: 1409028232
- Preceded by: Porno

Skagboys is a 2012 novel by Scottish writer Irvine Welsh. It is a prequel to his 1993 novel Trainspotting, and its 2002 sequel Porno. It follows the earlier lives of characters Renton and Sick Boy as they first descend into heroin addiction.

== Background ==
When Welsh described the novel he said: "I think I'm going to call it Skag Boys: "skag" is my favourite word for heroin. It's set before their fall into heroin and investigates how the main characters became junkies, the family dynamics, the anxieties of young men. A lot of the fringe characters become more prominent".

"I had a great deal of material that for various reasons, namely pace and because it didn't fit with the timeframe, wasn't suitable for the book. There's a particular section about Renton and Sick Boy's first visit to London to stay with their friend Nicksy in Hackney that I always wanted to publish, but it was just a bit too long for magazines and anthologies. So I've pulled back some of the other unused Trainspotting material and put alongside this piece. The thing is basically a prequel to Trainspotting. It's basically about how Renton and Sick Boy went from being daft young guys just out for the buzz on drugs, to total junkies. It shows how their attitudes and behaviour start to change as they become more defined by the drug and the culture around it."

In 2012, Welsh said the prequel was actually initially written as part of Trainspotting but was not used in the published version. He later decided he would either erase his old work or use it in some way, as "he had a fear that he might fall under a bus and leave behind 'half-written stuff' which people would publish". He said, "I just went through it and started writing on the basis of what was there, getting inspired by what I was reading and chopping bits out and putting bits in. Before I knew it I had another novel on my hands".

== Plot summary ==
The novel begins in Yorkshire in 1984, where Mark Renton and his father Davie have travelled to join a picket of the coke plant. Mark is shaken after getting caught in the violence, and he travels to Manchester, where at a party he is offered heroin, which he refuses. In the Banana Flats, Sick Boy decides to seduce his neighbours' daughter, Maria. He goes to the pub with her father, Coke, but they are ejected by the violent, ex-cop landlord Dickson.

Renton, Begbie, Spud, Tommy and Keezbo are watching football in a pub when teenage Samantha Frenchard arrives and confronts Begbie over her pregnancy. Renton and Sick Boy visit Swanney, a drug dealer, and Renton takes heroin for the first time. Samantha's family begin planning revenge on Begbie for his dismissive response to the pregnancy.

Sick Boy and Coke visit Dickson's pub again, but Dickson beats Coke unconscious, and he later dies in hospital. Renton moves in with Sick Boy. At a drug den in Muirhouse, Renton meets Alison and later finds out that her mother is dying; her friend Sylvia takes Renton home to Lochend for sex. Renton later gives Spud his first hit of heroin. Alison learns that her boss's brother is involved in drug smuggling, and seduces her boss.

During an Aberdeen University trip to Europe, Renton begins a relationship with his classmate Fiona. Returning home, he learns that his brother has died. Amid tensions between Renton and his family during funeral preparations, Fiona arrives and soothes the situation. Meanwhile, with Maria in Nottingham, Sick Boy seduces her mother Janey and encourages her to fraudulently claim Coke's pension. Begbie stabs one of Samantha's brothers.

While Dickson is cleared of Coke's murder, Sick Boy secretly reports Janey for benefit fraud and she goes to prison, while Sick Boy takes Maria under his control. Begbie, Tommy, and others go to Pilton and besiege the Frenchard family's home, culminating in Begbie smashing her brother Ronnie's face with an iron bar.

In Aberdeen, Renton meets Don, who becomes his heroin connection. His relationship with Fiona deteriorates and eventually ends due to his heroin use. Sick Boy pimps Maria to support their heroin addictions, and lets homeless Spud stay at his flat. When Don leaves town, Renton moves back to Edinburgh to also stay with Sick Boy.

Renton, Sick Boy, Begbie, Keezbo, Tommy and Spud attempt a burglary, but interrupt a Spanish au pair, Carmelita, during an attempted suicide. Later, Alison, Renton and Sick Boy go to Swanney's after visiting a club, and Alison recognises a worker from the chemical plant supplying heroin to Swanney. Alison takes Sick Boy home to Pilrig, where they engage in pegging. Sick Boy and Maria visit Janey in prison, who is distraught at their relationship. Back in Leith, Sick Boy connects a drugged Maria with more clients, including Dickson.

Alison befriends Maria and delivers her to her family in Nottingham. After witnessing her mother's death from cancer she visits Swanney, where Matty and Swanney argue about Matty's attempts to deal.

Renton and Sick Boy go to stay with Nicksy in London. Sick Boy is dating a rich woman, Lucinda, under false pretenses. He encourages Lucinda to shoot heroin, and later connects with Nicksy's neighbour and love interest Marsha. Begbie phones Renton to say he is moving in with June, whose father caught them having sex and kicked her out. Sick Boy and Renton successfully interview for a job on a Sealink Harwich-Amsterdam ferry, with the intention of smuggling heroin.

Renton and Nicksy go back to Leith for Hogmanay, leaving Sick Boy in London. At a party, Renton comforts a bereaved Alison, before spending a night with Lesley. The next morning Renton joins his friends in the pub for the Hibs-Hearts game, after which violence erupts.

Begbie has started working as an enforcer for local gangster Davie Power, and is ordered to menace his uncle Dickie, a pub owner, resolving the situation with extreme violence.

Learning Spud is a heroin addict, Renton's parents suspect Renton is too, and argue. Afterwards, at the pub, Davie Renton has a bitter argument with Dickson. Davie's oldest son, Billy, witnesses the confrontation, and after Davie leaves, lures Dickson outside in order to beat him savagely, while his friends wreck the pub.

In London, Nicksy finds Marsha's aborted foetus in the block's rubbish chute while trying to rescue a puppy, and resolves to bury it at sea.

Begbie interrupts Tommy with new girlfriend Lizzie, trying to persuade him to participate in a violent outing at the Hibs-Aberdeen game, but Tommy is increasingly wary of his friends. A despondent Alison meets a drunk Begbie in the street, June having suffered a miscarriage. Begbie engages in violence again shortly afterwards, and is sent to prison.

On the guys' first day on the boat, some football hooligans start a riot, during which Sick Boy steals the wallet of their supervisor, Cream Shirt, and Renton takes heroin and skives. Renton begins a sexual relationship with their colleague Charlene, a career thief. The next morning drug kingpin Marriot briefs Renton, Sick Boy, and Nicksy about their role as mules, but they decide to withdraw from the scam. Marriot, furious, is forced to transport 50 grams of heroin through customs alone. They return to Hackney, resolving not to return to Sealink. After a brief, intense fling, Charlene dumps Renton, and accidentally takes Nicksy's foetus while attempting to steal from Renton as she leaves. Nicksy goes upstairs to confront Marsha about the foetus, but during the altercation climbs out onto her window ledge. Sick Boy and Lucinda arrive at the flats to find police trying to talk Nicksy inside. Marsha reveals Sick Boy's infidelities to Lucinda, who storms off. A social worker takes Nicksy away.

Later, Renton is on methadone, but still using. He spends a night at his family home, but argues with his family the next day, confessing his heroin habit. Renton sells records for heroin money, but Swanney pockets this for previous debts, and has no more heroin for them. Sick Boy, Matty, and Renton meet Maria and her friend Jenny at a bar, where Renton learns that two friends are both HIV-positive. Renton and Matty steal a charity collection tin. While trying to open it, they rescue Keezbo, whose parents have locked him on a balcony. Opening the tin, they are intercepted by police, and Renton, Keezbo and Matty are arrested. Keezbo and Renton are ordered into rehab, while Matty is given a suspended sentence. Renton, Swanney, Sick Boy, Spud and Seeker enter rehab together.

Alison is struggling to hold down her job with a heroin addiction, but is protected by Alexander, her lover and boss. After an argument, she quits, later slashing her wrists. Realizing her mistake, she calls an ambulance. Alexander comes to look after her, but ends their affair.

In rehab, Renton rebels, Sick Boy seduces a fellow inmate, and Swanney suggests that Matty is an informant. On his release, Renton is already planning to score during his welcome home party.

In prison, Begbie is asked by Renton to beat up a paedophile (in fact Hazel's father), but Begbie brutally assaults the wrong man.

Renton wakes up next to Hazel, before joining Sick Boy to look for heroin, amid a severe heroin drought in Edinburgh. Walking past the chemical plant where the morphine is made, they hatch a plan to rob it, which Renton, Sick Boy, Keezbo, Spud and Matty carry out that evening. Upon entering, they trigger the alarm, but during their escape Keezbo gets marooned inside, through Matty's fault. Renton and Sick Boy turn on Matty afterwards and he leaves, to be comforted by Spud. On their way home, Renton and Sick Boy make a pact to get clean and never touch heroin again, but as they open the door of the flat, the phone is ringing.

The book is punctuated by bulletin-style updates on the spread of AIDS in Edinburgh, including growing lists of victims featuring main and incidental characters from the plot.

== Reception ==
Sam Leith, in the Financial Times, argues, "Heroin addiction is there not as a metaphor but as a sort of paradigm: a morally inverted Thatcherism. The addict is the ultimate individualist."

3:AM Magazine remarks, "It was known that there was more material of Trainspotting than went into the final draft, but that’s true of most novels. So you anticipate a lashed-together series of outtakes and bloopers. What you get is something quite different. The prequel has all the marvellous set pieces, the schemes, stories, scams and dreams and the same mad profusion of narrators that characterises everything Welsh has written. But it’s long, strange, full of lush description that gives the whole thing a haunting and elegiac quality".
