= Glue (novel) =

Book by Irvine Welsh

- First edition
- Author: Irvine Welsh
- Language: English, Scots
- Publisher: Jonathan Cape (UK); W W Norton (US)
- Publication date: 2001
- Publication place: Scotland
- Media type: Print (Paperback)
- Pages: 469 pp (paperback edition)
- ISBN: 0-393-32215-7 (paperback edition)
- OCLC: 46671177
- Dewey Decimal: 823/.914 21
- LC Class: PR6073.E47 G58 2001
- Followed by: Porno and A Decent Ride

Glue is a 2001 novel by Scottish writer Irvine Welsh. Glue tells the stories of four Scottish boys over four decades, through the use of different perspectives and different voices. It addresses sex, drugs, violence, and other social issues in Scotland, mapping "the furious energies of working-class masculinity in the late 20th century, using a compulsive mixture of Lothians dialect, libertarian socialist theory, and an irresistible black humour." The title refers not to solvent abuse, but the metaphorical glue holding the four friends together through changing times.

The four main characters are Terry Lawson (Juice Terry), Billy Birrell (Business Birrell), Andrew Galloway (Gally), Carl Ewart (DJ N-Sign). We first meet them as small children in 1970, then as teenagers around 1980, as young men around 1990 (on holiday in Munich), and as men in their late thirties around 2000 (during the Edinburgh Festival). The novel is split into five different sections.

== Characters ==
- Carl "The Milky Bar Kid" Ewart: Carl is, along with Billy, one of the four boys to have a stable family environment. This makes him one of the group's most normal and well-adjusted members. His father, Duncan, instilled both a love of music and strong code of ethics in his son from a very young age. Carl is very philosophical and open minded, despite sometimes being self-centered and arrogant. He is close to his mates, especially Gally. He is called "The Milky Bar Kid" because of his white-blond hair. He eventually strikes it big as a DJ and his nickname becomes N-SIGN Ewart.
  - Parents: Duncan and Maria Ewart
- Billy "Business" Birrell: Billy is the most driven member of the group. He is very honorable and believes in fairness. As a youth he gets involved in amateur boxing and eventually goes pro, becoming very successful, in part because of his involvement with some shady gangsters. Billy becomes the most successful member of the group, eventually running a bar after retiring from boxing. This, however, estranges him from his old friends.
  - Father: Wullie; Brother: Rab Birrell
- Terence Henry "Juice Terry" Lawson: Terry is a self-centered waster whose main interests are sex and drinking. His father Henry deserted the family when he was a young child, fueling a lifelong hatred for the man. He also hates Walter Ulrich, the German man his mother married after his father left. He is very disrespectful to his mother and is very sexist. In the later parts of his life, he supports himself through theft and unemployment benefit. Terry is very arrogant and insults everyone, even his close friends. Despite his faults, he is a caring and faithful friend. His nickname Juice Terry is derived from the job he had as a teenager selling juice in the scheme.
  - Sister: Yvonne Lawson; Son: Jason Lawson
- Andrew "Gally" Galloway: Gally is the heart and soul of the group, yet suffers from an intense self-hatred. His father was a criminal who was incarcerated throughout Gally's childhood. Because of this, Gally became the man of the house, looking out for his mother and sister. He is a gentle and caring person, but is sometimes prone to fits of anger. He serves two terms in jail during the novel, and becomes HIV positive through using heroin to combat his depression. His depression is fueled by his relationship with Gail, a woman he lost his virginity to after being released from juvenile hall at 18 and subsequently impregnated. He married Gail, but their relationship suffered due to her infidelity. She takes his daughter from him after she is injured during one of their fights. All this leads to drastic actions by Gally which split the group apart.

=== Other characters ===
- "Post" Alec Connolly: Terry's friend, an alcoholic and one time postman who assists Terry with house burglary.
- "Polmont" McMurray: a largely silent acquaintance of the group whose actions have a major impact on Gally in particular.
- Rab Birrel: Billy Birrel's brother, Friends with Terry. Goes on a bender with Kathryn Joyner, Terry, Lisa, Alec and Charlene in the 2000s. Wears a bright yellow-green Hibernian F.C shirt that was gifted by his mother. Used to be a casual.
- Kathryn Joyner: a famous but troubled American singer whose chance meeting with Terry in one of the novel's comical scenes, leads to an unexpected night out in Edinburgh.
