= Irvine Welsh =

Scottish novelist (born 1958)

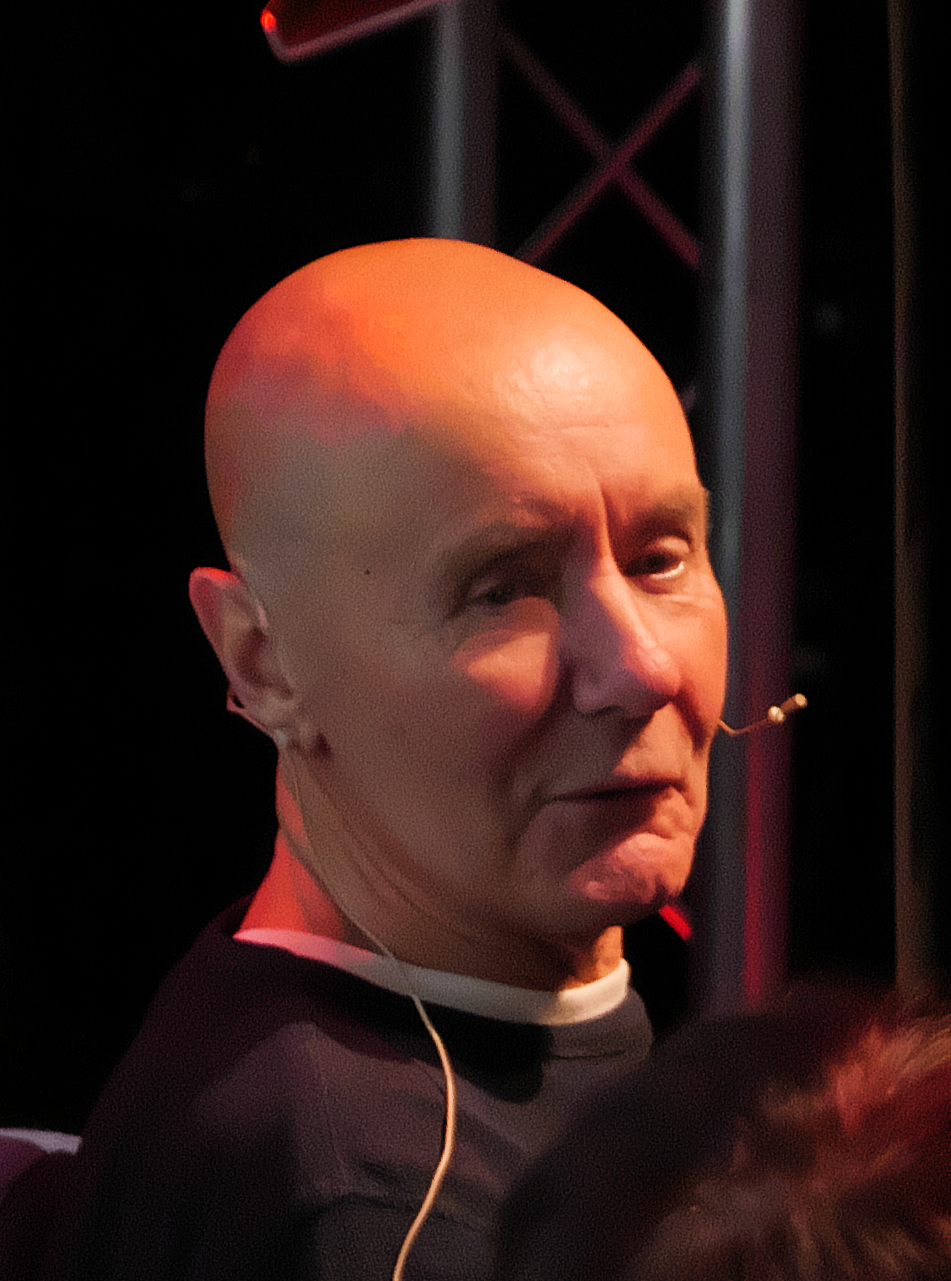
- Welsh speaking at Bloody Scotland, 2024
- Born: 27 September 1958 (age 68); Leith, Edinburgh, Scotland
- Education: Heriot-Watt University (MBA)
- Occupation: Writer
- Writing career
- Genres: Novel, play, short story
- Notable works: Trainspotting (1993); The Acid House (1994); Marabou Stork Nightmares (1995); Filth (1998); Glue (2001); Porno (2002); Skagboys (2012); A Decent Ride (2015)
- Movement: Postmodern literature
- Website: www.irvinewelsh.net

Irvine Welsh (born 27 September 1958) is a Scottish novelist, short story writer, screenwriter and filmmaker. His novels and short stories, which almost always take place in his native Scotland, are known for their gritty depictions of working-class life and its intricacies; particularly drug addiction, social alienation, lack of opportunity and boredom, amongst others.

Welsh is best known for his 1993 debut novel Trainspotting, which was adapted into a film of the same name; both were highly acclaimed and have become cult classics in their respective mediums. The novel was ranked 7th in a 2016 public poll of the best Scottish novels of all time, while its film adaptation was named the best Scottish film of all time in an equivalent 2004 poll.

In addition to his novels, Welsh has written plays and screenplays, and directed several short films. As of 2025, his written works have sold six million copies worldwide.

== Early life ==
Irvine Welsh was born in Leith, the port area of Edinburgh. He states that he was born in 1958. When he was four, his family moved to Muirhouse, in Edinburgh, where they stayed in local housing schemes. His mother worked as a waitress. His father was a dock worker in Leith until bad health forced him to stop, after which he became a carpet salesman; he died when Welsh was 25. Welsh left Ainslie Park High School when he was 16 and then completed a City and Guilds course in electrical engineering. He became an apprentice TV repairman until an electric shock persuaded him to move on to a series of other jobs.

Welsh left Edinburgh for the London punk scene in 1978, where he played guitar, then bass, in the Pubic Lice. When Welsh was in his early twenties, he was addicted to heroin for 18 months while playing in bands moving between Edinburgh and London. A series of arrests for petty crimes and finally a suspended sentence for trashing a North London community centre inspired Welsh to correct his ways. He worked for Hackney Council in London and studied computing with the support of the Manpower Services Commission.

Welsh returned to Edinburgh in the late 1980s, where he worked for the city council in the housing department. He then studied for an MBA at Heriot-Watt University.

== Fiction ==
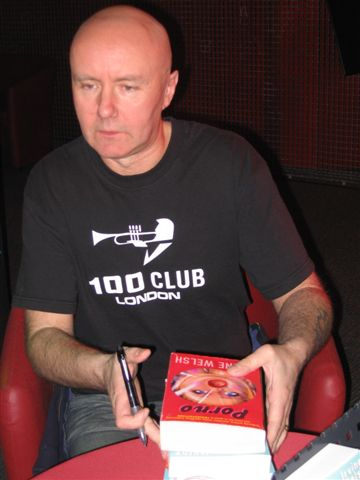
Irvine Welsh in Warsaw, 13 March 2006

Welsh has published eleven novels and four collections of short stories. His first novel, Trainspotting, was published in 1993. Set in the mid-1980s, it uses a series of non-linear and loosely connected short-stories to tell the story of a group of characters tied together by decaying friendships, heroin addiction and stabs at escape from the oppressive boredom and brutality of their lives in the social housing schemes. It was released to shock and outrage in some circles and great acclaim in others. It was adapted as a play, and a film adaptation, directed by Danny Boyle and written by John Hodge, was released in 1996. Welsh appeared in the film in the minor role of drug dealer Mikey Forrester.

Next, Welsh released The Acid House, a collection of short stories from Rebel Inc., New Writing Scotland and other sources. Many of the stories take place in and around the housing schemes from Trainspotting, and employ many of the same themes; a touch of fantasy is apparent in stories such as The Acid House, where the minds of a baby and a drug user swap bodies, or The Granton Star Cause, where God transforms a man into a fly as punishment for wasting his life. Welsh adapted three of the stories for a later film of the same name, in which he also appeared.

Welsh's third book (and second novel), Marabou Stork Nightmares, alternates between a grim tale of thugs and schemes in sub-working class Scotland and a hallucinatory adventure tale set in South Africa.

His next book, Ecstasy: Three Tales of Chemical Romance (1996), became his most high-profile work since Trainspotting, released in the wave of publicity surrounding the film. It consists of three unconnected novellas: the first, Lorraine Goes To Livingston, is a bawdy satire of classic British romance novels, the second, Fortune's Always Hiding, is a revenge story involving thalidomide and the third, The Undefeated, is a sly, subtle romance between a young woman dissatisfied with the confines of her suburban life and an aging clubgoer.

A corrupt police officer and his tapeworm served as the narrators for his third novel, Filth (1998). The novel was adapted to a film of the same name in 2013.

Glue (2001) was a return to the locations, themes and episodic form of Trainspotting, telling the stories of four characters spanning several decades in their lives and the bonds that held them together.

Having revisited some of them in passing in Glue, Welsh brought most of the Trainspotting characters back for a sequel, Porno, in 2002. In this book Welsh explores the impact of pornography on the individuals involved in producing it, as well as society as a whole, and the impact of aging and maturity in individuals against their will. The book is set just after the opening of the new Scottish Parliament.

The Bedroom Secrets of the Master Chefs (2006), deals with a young, alcoholic civil servant who finds himself inadvertently putting a curse on his nemesis, a nerdy co-worker. In 2007, Welsh published If You Liked School You'll Love Work, his first collection of short stories in over a decade.

In 2004 Welsh contributed a novella called Contamination to The Weekenders: Travels in the Heart of Africa. Welsh, Ian Rankin, and Alexander McCall Smith each contributed a short story for the One City compilation published in 2005 in benefit of the One City Trust for social inclusion in Edinburgh. In 2008 Welsh published a sequel to Filth, Crime, which features detective Ray Lennox recovering from a mental breakdown induced by occupational stress and cocaine abuse, and a particularly horrifying child sex murder case back in Edinburgh. The story takes place in Florida.

Welsh's prequel to Trainspotting, titled Skagboys, was published in 2012. Set in Leith in the early 1980s, it introduces the Trainspotting characters and follows them as they fall into heroin addiction. The book consists of a series of linked short stories interspersed with brief commentaries on contemporary British politics. In particular, it shows the consequences of the destruction of industry in the northern cities for the young working class. His eighth novel, The Sex Lives of Siamese Twins, was published in May 2014 and his ninth novel titled A Decent Ride was published by Vintage Books in April 2015. The latter work featured the returning character 'Juice' Terry Lawson (previously from Glue and Porno).

Welsh's tenth novel, released in April 2016, The Blade Artist, centres around a seemingly rehabilitated Francis Begbie now living in California with a wife and children. It was shortlisted for the Fiction Book of the Year at Saltire Literary Awards 2016.

A sequel to The Blade Artist, entitled Dead Men's Trousers, was released on 29 March 2018, and sees Mark Renton, Sick Boy, and Spud reuniting with Francis Begbie.

In 2021, a TV adaptation of Crime was launched in the UK on BritBox as a six-episode series starring Dougray Scott as detective Lennox. Welsh worked on the project with Dean Cavanagh. This was the first TV adaptation of a book by Welsh. A second six-episode series has since been made and is currently available on ITV and ITVX.

Las Vegas is the setting for Welsh's novel 2026 Can Nothing Save Us?, launched on August 16th at the Edinburgh International Book Festival. The novel touches on paranoia and issues connected with a divided family.

== Film and stage ==
As well as fiction, Welsh has written several stage plays, including Headstate, You'll Have Had Your Hole, and the musical Blackpool, which featured original songs by Vic Godard of the Subway Sect.

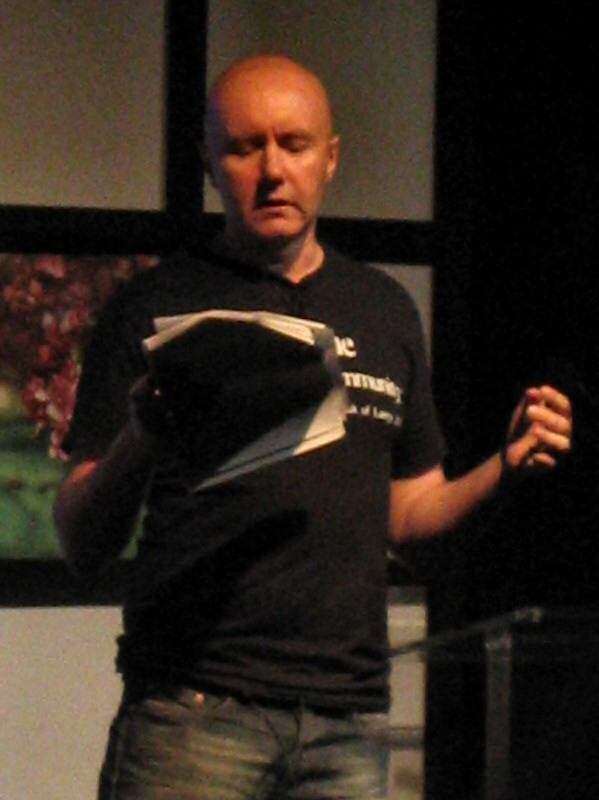
Irvine Welsh in 2004

Welsh co-authored Babylon Heights with his screen writing partner Dean Cavanagh. The play premiered in San Francisco at the Exit Theatre and made its European première in Dublin, at The Mill Theatre Dundrum, directed by Graham Cantwell. The plot revolves around the behind-the-scenes antics of a group of Munchkins on the set of The Wizard of Oz. The production included the use of oversized sets with actors of regular stature.

Cavanagh and Welsh have also collaborated on screenplays. The Meat Trade is based on the 19th-century West Port murders. Despite the historical source material, Welsh has set the story in the familiar confines of present-day Edinburgh, with Burke and Hare depicted as brothers who steal human organs to meet the demands of the global transplant market.

Wedding Belles, a film made for Channel 4 that was written by Welsh and Cavanagh, aired at the end of March 2007. The film centres around the lives of four young women, who are played by Michelle Gomez, Shirley Henderson, Shauna MacDonald, and Kathleen McDermot. Wedding Belles was nominated for a Scottish BAFTA and was subsequently sold to TV channels in Canada and Europe.

Welsh has directed several short films for bands. In 2001 he directed a 15-minute film for Gene's song "Is It Over" which is taken from the album Libertine. In 2006 he directed a short film to accompany the track "Atlantic" from Keane's album Under the Iron Sea.

Welsh directed his first short dramatic film, NUTS, which he co-wrote with Cavanagh. The film features Joe McKinney as a man dealing with testicular cancer in post-Celtic tiger Ireland. It was released in 2007.

Welsh co-directed "The Right to liberty", a chapter of the documentary film The New Ten Commandments, in 2008.

In 2009, Welsh co-directed (with Helen Grace) the film Good Arrows, a mockumentary about a darts player staging a comeback. It was written by Welsh and Cavanagh.

In July 2026, a stage musical adaptation of Trainspotting written by Welsh with music and lyrics by Welsh and Stephen McGuinness opened in London's West End at the Theatre Royal Haymarket.

== Themes ==
As well as recreational drug use, Welsh's fiction and non-fiction is dominated by the question of working class and Scottish identity in the period spanning the 1960s to the present day. Within this, he explores the rise and fall of the council housing scheme, denial of opportunity, low-paid work, unemployment, social assistance, sectarianism, football, hooliganism, sex, suppressed homosexuality, dance clubs, freemasonry, Irish republicanism, sodomy, class divisions, emigration and, perhaps most of all, the humour, prejudices and axioms of the Scots.

Sam Leith, writing in the Financial Times, argues that: "Welsh's concerns are with sin and salvation, with the exercise of free will and with the individual soul. He's much more interested in teleology than sociology."

== Style ==
Welsh's novels share characters, giving the feel of a "shared universe" within his writing. For example, characters from Trainspotting make cameo appearances in The Acid House, Marabou Stork Nightmares, Ecstasy, Filth, and slightly larger appearances in Glue, whose characters then appear in Porno.

Welsh is known for writing in his native Edinburgh dialect of Scots. He generally ignores the traditional conventions of literary Scots, used for example by Allan Ramsay, Robert Fergusson, Robert Burns, Robert Louis Stevenson, and James Orr. Instead, he transcribes dialects phonetically.

Like Alasdair Gray before him, Welsh also experiments with typography. In the novel Filth, the tapeworm's internal monologue is imposed over the top of the protagonist's own internal monologue (the worm's host), visibly depicting the tapeworm's voracious appetite, much like the "Climax of Voices" in Gray's novel 1982, Janine.

== Personal life ==
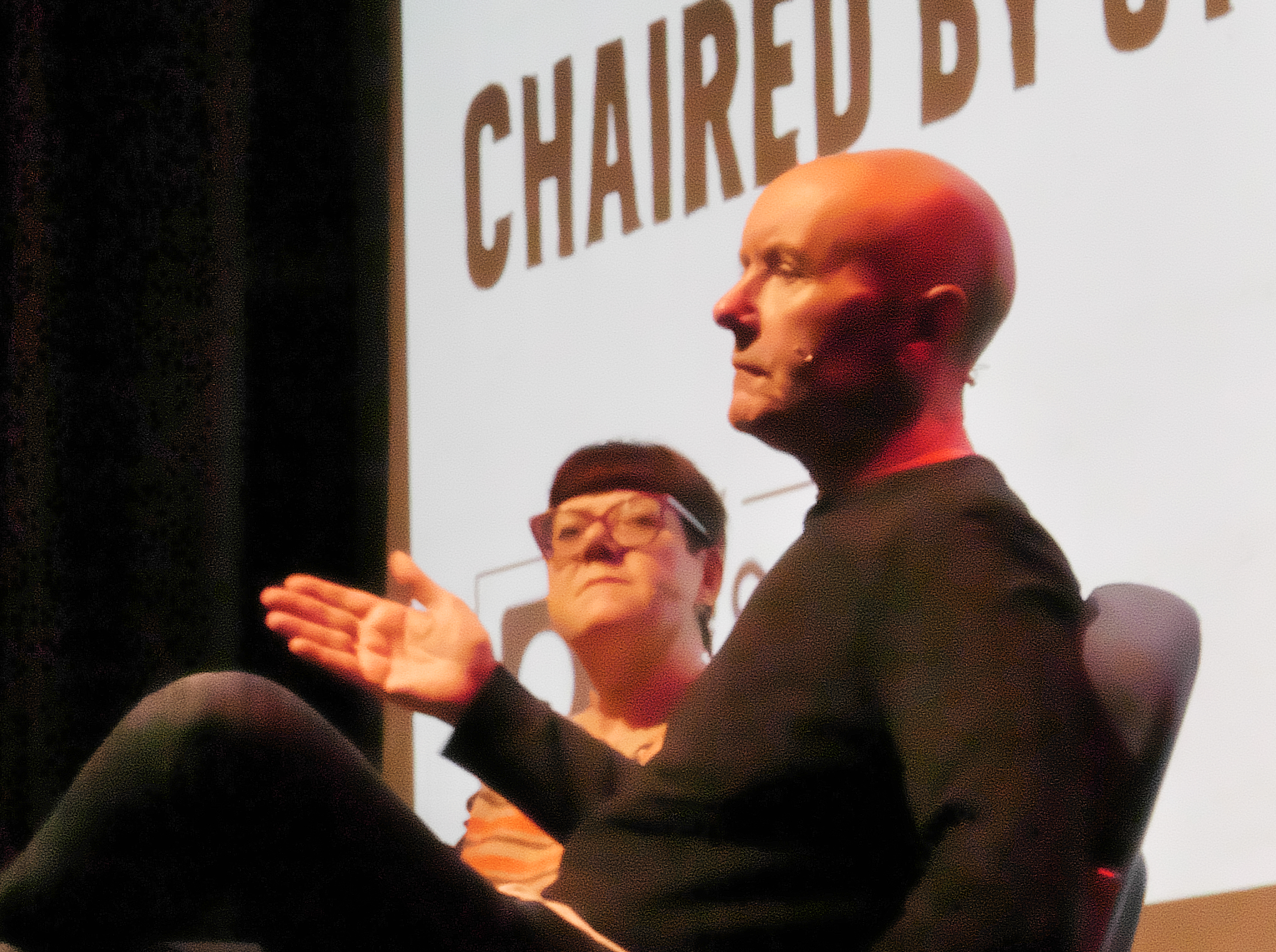
Irvine Welsh with Louise Welsh (a distant relative) at Bloody Scotland 2024

Welsh married Beth Quinn in 2005. They were divorced in 2018. They had lived together in the Lakeview neighbourhood of Chicago, USA, since 2009. Before that, he lived in Dublin. In 2018, he was living in Miami, USA.

In 2022, Welsh married Emma Currie, an actor and sister of Scottish musician Momus.

Welsh is an avid supporter of Hibernian F.C. The club is frequently referenced in his works.

== Political views ==
In 2013, Welsh expressed his support for Scottish independence ahead of the following year's referendum on the issue.

In May 2025, Welsh signed an open letter calling for an immediate ceasefire in Gaza during the Gaza War. The letter described Israel's actions there as "genocidal". He criticised the proscribing of Palestine Action, saying, "You're in a situation whereby 35 rabbis in New York are described as anti-Semitic because they're protesting against the genocide of children. That's absolute nonsense." He also criticised Keir Starmer's Labour government, saying that it had done nothing except benefit "the super-rich".

In October 2026, he signed an open letter backing author Sally Rooney, whose books were withdrawn from sale in the United Kingdom due to her support for Palestine Action, and calling the withdrawal an "affront to basic principles of free speech and expression".

== Bibliography ==
=== Novels ===
- Marabou Stork Nightmares (1995)
- The Bedroom Secrets of the Master Chefs (2006)
- Kingdom of Fife (2007)
- The Sex Lives of Siamese Twins (2014)
- Can Nothing Save Us? (2026)

==== Trainspotting series ====
- Trainspotting (1993)
- Porno (2002)
- Skagboys (2012)
- The Blade Artist (2016)
- Dead Men's Trousers (2018)
- Men In Love (2025)

==== Ray Lennox series ====
- Filth (1998)
- Crime (2008)
- The Long Knives (2022)
- Resolution (2024)

==== Terry Lawson series ====
- Glue (2001)
- A Decent Ride (2015)

=== Short story collections ===
- The Acid House (1994)
- Ecstasy: Three Tales of Chemical Romance (1996)
- If You Liked School You'll Love Work (2007)
- Reheated Cabbage (2009)
- The Seal Club (2020 co-written with Alan Warner and John King)
- Seal Club 2: The View From Poacher's Hill (2023 co-written with Alan Warner and John King)

=== Screenplays ===
- You'll Have Had Your Hole (drama)
- Dose (BBC drama written with Dean Cavanagh)
- The Acid House (screenplay)
- Wedding Belles (2007 film for Channel 4 written with Dean Cavanagh)
- Four Play (a collection of his books that have been adapted for the stage)
- Dockers (1999 one-off TV drama for Channel 4, co-written by Jimmy McGovern)
- Nuts (2007 short film)
- Good Arrows (2009 film)
- Bad Blood (2005 short film co-written by him, based on a section of the novel Trainspotting)
- Creation stories (2021 film)

=== Theatre ===
- Babylon Heights (co-written with Dean Cavanagh)
- You'll Have Had Your Hole
- Performers (co-written with Dean Cavanagh)
- Trainspotting: The Musical (co-written with Stephen McGuinness)

== Adaptations ==
=== Film ===
- Trainspotting (1996)
- The Acid House (1998)
- Irvine Welsh's Ecstasy (2011)
- Filth (2013)
- T2 Trainspotting (2017)
- Creation Stories (2021)
- The Blade Artist (TBA)

=== Theatre ===
- Ecstasy
- Glue
- Filth
- Trainspotting
- Marabou Stork Nightmares
- PORNO

=== Television ===
- Irvine Welsh's Crime
