= Porno (novel) =

Novel by Irvine Welsh

- Author: Irvine Welsh
- Language: English, Scots
- Genre: Novel
- Publisher: Jonathan Cape
- Publication date: August 2002
- Publication place: Scotland
- Media type: Print (Hardback & Paperback)
- Pages: 320 pp (first edition, hardback)
- ISBN: 0-224-06296-4 (first edition, hardback)
- OCLC: 49740841
- Preceded by: Trainspotting and Glue
- Followed by: The Blade Artist and A Decent Ride

Porno is a 2002 novel by Scottish writer Irvine Welsh, the sequel to Trainspotting. The book follows the characters of Trainspotting ten years after the events of the earlier book, as their paths cross again, this time with the pornography business as the backdrop rather than heroin use (although numerous drugs, particularly cocaine, are mentioned throughout). A number of characters from Glue make an appearance as well. A film tie-in edition of the novel titled T2 Trainspotting was released in 2017 to coincide with the release of the film adaptation of the same name.

This novel picks up some ideas of the film adaptation of Trainspotting. One example is the fact that "Spud" has received his share of the drug money, which is shown in the film, but only alluded to in the book.

== Plot summary ==
=== Section 1: Stag ===
Simon 'Sick Boy' Williamson leaves the London crack scene and returns to Leith when he comes into ownership of his aunt's pub. Convinced that the area is destined to become a social and cultural hub, Simon decides to focus his energy into making the pub an upper class establishment. Nikki Fuller-Smith is a university student who works part-time in a massage parlour. Rab, a university acquaintance, introduces her to his friend Terry Lawson and his underground, home-made pornography operation. The scene interests Nikki.

Danny 'Spud' Murphy has been regularly attending group sessions in an attempt to kick his drug habit. His relationship with his partner Alison is estranged and Spud feels like he has become a burden on her. He considers his life insurance policy and contemplates suicide.

Meanwhile, in Amsterdam, Mark Renton is co-owner of a successful nightclub. One night, a DJ from his hometown (Carl Ewart from Welsh's previous novel Glue) plays at one of his clubs and recognises him.

When Sick Boy learns of Terry's operation, he offers the use of the upstairs bar to shoot some scenes. During their first meeting, the group begins planning to shoot a full-length adult film. The first section concludes with "OOTSIDE", a chapter noting the release into society of Francis Begbie.

=== Section 2: Porno ===
While in prison, Begbie received anonymous packages of gay porn sent from Sick Boy. He is determined to find the culprit upon his release. While accompanying an old friend on a debt collection errand, he meets Kate and begins a relationship with her.

When Alison begins working at Sick Boy's pub and Sick Boy deliberately attempts to end her relationship with Spud, the friendship between Spud and Sick Boy is over. During one heated argument, Spud reveals that he received his share of the money from Renton. He also unveils his recent ambition to write a history of Leith.

Begbie visits Sick Boy's pub. As the two converse, Sick Boy considers the merciless trait of opportunity and threat accompanying Begbie's release. Soon after, Terry, Rab and several other friends arrive and begin discussing their upcoming road trip to Amsterdam, a bachelor celebration for Rab. Sick Boy is initially reluctant to attend but changes his mind after Carl, a DJ, mentions that Renton works at a club there.

Begbie kills Chizzie, a pederast he met in prison who is also a friend of Spud.

=== Section 3: Exhibition ===
Sick Boy's "Porno" shoot becomes a slow demolition of his so-called mates. Spud ends their friendship when Sick Boy tells him he was using him for the purpose of a scam, Nikki becomes disillusioned with him after realising that he really has no loving side and really is the cold-hearted, deceitful man that she tried desperately to ignore.

Begbie grows tired of Sick Boy being 'smarmy', although Begbie becomes angry with everyone in due course. Spud tries to provoke Begbie into killing him so his wife Alison will profit from his life insurance. As Begbie is angrily beating Spud, Alison and the couple's young son burst in, stopping them. Spud is severely injured, but his last narration implies that he can see life getting better.

The biggest departure Sick Boy has from his life is Renton. After promising to meet Sick Boy in Cannes, Renton instead goes to Zürich to empty their joint account and then start a new life in San Francisco. This deception is the biggest blow to Sick Boy as he obviously treasured their unconventional friendship and cannot believe he was tricked by Renton again.

Begbie later discovers Renton while visiting Leith and is hit by a car while running across the road to assault him. While Renton would have expected to feel happy by this he is heartbroken and comforts Begbie while he is taken to hospital. It is indicated that as Begbie slips into a coma he may have forgiven Renton. After learning that Begbie has fallen into a coma, Renton flees the country with Nikki and Diane, as well as Sick Boy's £60,000 made from a financial fraud. The book ends with Begbie suddenly coming awake as Sick Boy confesses everything in hope that Begbie will resume his bloodthirsty hunt for Renton.

== Style ==
The novel is divided into three sections, each of which comprises chapters with different narrators. Unlike Trainspotting, which had more narrational diversity, Porno is reduced to just five narrators: Sick Boy, Renton, Spud, Begbie and Nikki. Another difference from the format of Trainspotting is that each character has a defined chapter heading depending on what chapter it is. For instance, Sick Boy's chapters all begin with "Scam..." and then a number in front of a "#". Renton's all begin with "Whores of Amsterdam Pt..." Spud's chapters are just narrative, Begbie's are in capitals, and Nikki's are quotes from the chapter, for example "...A SIMON DAVID WILLIAMSON PRODUCTION...".

Each narrator is associated with a distinctive prose style. Renton, Sick Boy, and Nikki's chapters are written almost entirely in "standard" English while Begbie and Spud's chapters are in Scots. For example, in Chapter 25, Spud narrates, "So ah'm downcast git intae the library, thinkin tae masel" ("So I'm downcast when I get into the library thinking to myself"). He also repeats certain words when talking such as "catboy" or "cat", "likes" or "likesay", and "ken?" Begbie often swears a lot during his chapters. Sick Boy's returning grandiose nature is featured in imagined interviews with John Gibson of the Evening News and Alex McLeish.

== Main characters ==
- Simon David "Sick Boy" Williamson - bitter by a string of failed business ventures, Sick Boy decides to make a porn film. A heavy cocaine user and still angry about being ripped off by Renton in the previous novel. In the years since Trainspotting he had a son with a woman who is now his ex-wife. He has also lost some of the charisma and good looks he previously possessed.
- Mark "Rents" Renton - kicked heroin and owns a successful nightclub in Amsterdam. He agrees to finance Sick Boy's porn film in exchange for a share of the profits, despite a mutual lack of trust and respect. Has got into shape and learned martial arts in anticipation and fear of an eventual meeting with Begbie.
- Nikki Fuller-Smith - an English 25-year old university student and film studies major who moonlights performing minor sexual favours at a sauna/massage parlour. Experiences intermittent bulimic disordered eating and is attracted to Sick Boy. She decides to help Sick Boy with his film by starring in it.
- Terry Lawson - an arrogant lothario, his sexual exploits find him involved in the local dogging / amateur pornography scene, into which Rab introduces Nikki, becoming the star of Seven Rides.
- Rab Birrell - brother of Billy Birrell and a college mate of Nikki also on her Film Studies course - and fuels the idea of exploiting the girls from Terry's pub, and Nikki's knowledge of film and pornography.
- Danny "Spud" Murphy - after receiving his share of the drug money he has been regularly attending group sessions in an attempt to kick his drug habit. Is in an estranged relationship with Alison (a character who was in an on / off relationship with Sick Boy in Trainspotting) and feels like he has become a burden on her. He considers his life insurance policy and contemplates suicide.
- Rab "Second Prize" McLaughlin - a recovering alcoholic, the fifth of the gang robbed by Renton at the end of Trainspotting (though not in the film). Has turned to religion in an attempt to cure his alcoholism and distance himself from his former friends.
- Francis "Franco" Begbie – a dangerous psychopath who seeks out his former friends after being recently released from prison. He ends up murdering the sex offender Chizzie, effectively destroying the plans of all the characters, though he sees his own actions as heroic.

== Film adaptation ==
Danny Boyle stated his wish to make a sequel to Trainspotting based on Porno which takes place nine years later. He was reportedly waiting until the original actors themselves age visibly enough to portray the same characters, ravaged by time; Boyle joked that the natural vanity of actors would make it a long wait. On 10 September 2009, Robert Carlyle revealed that Boyle was "edging closer" to making Porno. Carlyle, who played Begbie in the film, said he would "jump through hoops of fire backwards" for the filmmaker and would "do Porno tomorrow for nothing." Ewan McGregor, who played anti-hero Renton, expressed his reluctance to do a sequel saying it would be a "terrible shame". Boyle and McGregor had not worked together since 1997's A Life Less Ordinary, after which McGregor was passed over in favour of Leonardo DiCaprio for the lead role in Boyle's big screen adaptation of Alex Garland's novel, The Beach. In 2013, McGregor noted that he was "ready to work" on the film with Boyle after reconciling.

In 2013 Boyle said that any sequel to Trainspotting would be loosely based on Porno. On 6 May 2014, Welsh confirmed that he had spent a week with Boyle, Andrew Macdonald and the creative team behind Trainspotting to discuss the sequel. Welsh stated that the meeting was in order to "explore the story and script ideas. We're not interested in doing something that will trash the legacy of Trainspotting... we want to do something that's very fresh and contemporary."

On 17 November 2014, Welsh revealed that McGregor and Boyle had resolved their differences and had held meetings about the film, saying "I know Danny and Ewan are back in touch with each other again. There are others in the cast who’ve had a rocky road, but now also reconciled. With the Trainspotting sequel the attention is going to be even more intense this time round because the first was such a great movie - and Danny’s such a colossus now. We’re all protective of the Trainspotting legacy and we want to make a film that adds to that legacy and doesn’t take away from it."

Filming on a sequel to Trainspotting began in May 2016, with all the major cast members reprising their roles and Danny Boyle directing. It was released on 27 January 2017.

A stage adaptation of Porno, written by Davie Carswell and following the novel more closely than the film, premiered at the Edinburgh Fringe in 2022.

== Release details ==
- 2002, UK. Jonathan Cape. Hardback. First edition. ISBN 0-393-05723-2
- 2003, UK. Vintage Press. Paperback ISBN 0-09-942246-8
- 2002, USA. W. W. Norton. Hardback. ISBN 0-393-05723-2
- 2002, USA. W. W. Norton. Paperback ISBN 0-393-32450-8
