= Trainspotting (novel) =

1993 novel by Irvine Welsh

- First edition
- Author: Irvine Welsh
- Language: Scots; English
- Publisher: Secker & Warburg
- Publication date: 1993
- Publication place: Scotland
- Media type: Print (hardback and paperback)
- Pages: 344
- ISBN: 0-7493-9606-7
- OCLC: 34832527
- Dewey Decimal: 823/.914 20
- LC Class: PR6073.E47 T73 1994
- Followed by: Porno; Marabou Stork Nightmares

Trainspotting is the first novel by Scottish writer Irvine Welsh that was first published in 1993. It is written in Scots and Scottish English, revolving around various residents of Leith, Edinburgh, who either use heroin, are friends of the core group of heroin users, or engage in destructive activities that are effectively addictions. The novel is set in the late 1980s and has been described by The Sunday Times as "the voice of punk, grown up, grown wiser and grown eloquent". The title is an ironic reference to the characters’ frequenting of the disused Leith Central railway station.

The novel has since achieved a cult status and was the basis for the film Trainspotting (1996), directed by Danny Boyle. Three sequels, Porno, Dead Men's Trousers, and Men in Love, were published in 2002, 2018, and 2025 respectively. A prequel, Skagboys, was published in 2012.

== Characters ==
- Mark "Rent Boy" Renton – The novel's protagonist and most frequent narrator, Renton is the voice of reason among his group of friends, many of whom he dislikes. He narrates his daily life – from supporting his heroin addiction with dole money and petty theft to interacting with the "normal world" – with a cynical approach. He is intelligent and capable of participating in mainstream society, but he is misanthropic and depressed, and uses heroin to give purpose to his life as well as for hedonistic purposes.
- Simon "Sick Boy" Williamson – A handsome, promiscuous, amoral con artist and one of Renton's close friends. He is often on the lookout for potential scams and has little respect for the many women he seduces. Sick Boy swears off heroin after the death of the infant Dawn, implied to be his daughter, who asphyxiates while her mother Lesley and Sick Boy are on a heroin binge.
- Daniel "Spud" Murphy – Naive and childlike, Spud is both the whipping boy and only real source of comfort among Renton's circle of friends, who feel protective of him even as they take advantage of him. Spud is kind, sensitive, and loves animals. Spud is sent to Saughton Prison for a section of the novel for petty theft.
- Francis "Franco" Begbie – A violent psychopath and alcoholic, Begbie bullies his "friends" to go along with whatever he says, assaulting or intimidating anyone who challenges him. He expresses intense loyalty to his friends even though he considers junkies beneath him.
- Davie Mitchell – Another Leith native and acquaintance of Renton. Davie is a university graduate and holds down a decent job. His life is thrown into chaos when he contracts HIV. He narrates the chapters "Bad Blood" and "Traditional Sunday Breakfast".
- Tommy Lawrence MacKenzie – A childhood friend of Renton's, Tommy asks Renton for heroin to try after his girlfriend dumps him, which Renton reluctantly provides. Tommy's resulting addiction, illness and death weighs heavily on Renton's conscience.
- Rab "Second Prize" McLaughlin – A friend of the main group, who is often inebriated and gets into frequent fights while drunk, which he always loses. Second Prize had a promising career as a pro footballer for Manchester United, but he was fired from the team after a few years because of his drinking problem.

== Structure ==
The novel is split into seven sections. The first six sections contain multiple chapters from various perspectives; the final section contains one chapter. The novel's plot is nonlinear.

Most chapters are narrated in first-person, stream-of-consciousness style in some combination of Scots and Standard English. Some chapters are written from a third-person omniscient stance to convey the actions and thoughts of several characters in a scene.

== Plot summary ==
=== Section 1: Kicking ===
While watching a Jean-Claude Van Damme video, Mark and Simon (a.k.a. Sick Boy) decide to go and buy heroin from Johnny Swan (also called "Mother Superior") since they are both feeling symptoms of withdrawal. They cook up with Raymie and Alison. After being informed that he should go and see Kelly, who has just had an abortion, Renton goes home to finish his video instead.

Mark tries to come off heroin by acquiring a bare room and all the things he will require when coming down (canned soup, headache medicine, and pails for vomit). When withdrawal begins to set in, however, he resolves to get another hit to ease the decline. Unable to find any heroin, he acquires opium suppositories from Mikey Forrester, a dealer he hates. After a bout of diarrhoea, he must recover from a bookie's lavatory.

Simon attempts to pick up girls while being annoyed by Mark, who wants to watch videos. Simon loses Renton and launches into an internal self-glorifying, nihilistic diatribe.

Mark's goth cousin Nina is with her family following the death of her uncle Andy. She initially feigns indifference, but breaks down without realising it.

At a New Year's Eve party, Stevie Hutchinson cannot stop thinking about his girlfriend Stella, who is in London and hasn't called. Upon learning that she is getting the train back to Edinburgh, he leaves the party to meet her at the station, where they happily reunite.

An infant, Dawn, later dies. Her mother Lesley is a heroin addict and acquaintance of the group. The cause of death is unclear; characters speculate that it may have been cot death or caused by neglect. The Skag Boys are unsure of how to respond. Sick Boy becomes more emotional and distressed than the others and eventually breaks down, stating he is kicking heroin for good. Simon does not explicitly state that he was the child's father. Mark wants to comfort his friend, but is unsure how and cooks a shot for himself to deal with the situation. A sobbing Lesley asks him to also cook her up a hit, which Mark does but makes sure he injects himself before her.

After an argument with his girlfriend Carol, Second Prize meets Tommy in a pub, and Tommy confronts a man who is punching his girlfriend. They are shocked to find the woman supports her abusive boyfriend instead of her would-be liberators by digging her nails into Tommy's face, inciting a brawl. While the couple slips out unnoticed, Tommy and Second Prize find themselves taking the blame for the whole affair from the pub locals.

Spud and Renton, who have been assigned interviews as part of their job-seeking benefits, deliberately fail to get jobs, while attempting to obscure that it is deliberate.

=== Section 2: Relapsing ===
Tommy buys a ticket for an Iggy Pop concert but that's on the same day as his girlfriend Lizzie's birthday.

Renton, Begbie and their girlfriends meet up for a drink before going to a party, but it ends when Begbie throws a glass off a balcony, hitting someone and splitting open their head, setting off a pub brawl.

Tommy visits Renton's flat (shortly after Renton relapsed) after being dumped by Lizzie. Renton reluctantly gives him heroin, setting off Tommy's decline into addiction, HIV/AIDS, and later, death.

Davie wakes up in his girlfriend's bedroom after a night of heavy drinking to discover that he accidentally soiled the bed. He gets into a tug o'war with her mother of cleaning the sheets, resulting in faecal matter being sprayed all over his girlfriend and her parents during Sunday Breakfast.

Later, Renton's brother Billy and his friends Lenny, Naz, Peasbo, and Jackie are waiting for their friend Granty to arrive for a game of cards, as he is holding the money pot. They later find out that Granty is dead and his girlfriend disappeared with the money, prompting them to beat Jackie, whom they knew to have been sleeping with her.

=== Section 3: Kicking Again ===
Begbie and Lexo pull a crime, so Begbie decides to lie low in London with Renton.

Spud kicks heroin, and visits his grandmother, where his mixed-race uncle Dode is staying. Dode has had many troubles with racism growing up. One day, he and Spud went to a pub and were assaulted by skinheads. This abuse led to a fight, which left Dode hospitalised, where Spud visits him.

Renton kicks heroin and is restless. He picks up a girl at a nightclub, Dianne, unaware that she is only fourteen. He is later forced to lie to her parents at breakfast the following morning. Despite his guilt and discomfort, he sleeps with Dianne again when she appears at his flat.

Spud, Renton and Sick Boy take ecstasy and stroll to the Meadows, where Sick Boy and Renton try to kill a squirrel, but stop after Spud becomes upset, remembering Dawn. Mark is ashamed and Spud forgives him.

=== Section 4: Blowing It ===
Renton and Spud are in court for stealing books. Renton gets a suspended sentence owing to his attempts at rehabilitation, while Spud is sentenced to ten months in prison.

Sick Boy shoots a pit bull terrier with an air rifle, causing it to attack its skinhead owner, giving Sick Boy the excuse he needs to kill the dog. He is congratulated by the police.

Renton visits several psychiatrists, all of whom have different approaches to clinical psychology. Renton's cynicism has stopped him from forming a meaningful relationship or finding enjoyment out of anything.

Renton relapses and has to suffer heroin withdrawal at his parents' house, where he experiences hallucinations of Dawn, the television programme he is watching, and the lecture provided by his father. He is later visited by Sick Boy and goes out to a pub with his parents, whose enthusiasm acts as a veneer for their authoritative treatment.

Renton's brother Billy dies in Northern Ireland with the British Army. Renton attends the funeral; there, he almost starts a fight with some of his father's Unionist relatives, and ends up having sex with Billy's pregnant girlfriend in the toilet.

=== Section 5: Exile ===
Renton is stranded in London with no place to sleep. He tries to fall asleep in an all-night porno theatre, where he meets Gi, an elderly Italian homosexual who lets him stay at his flat. After unsuccessfully making a pass at Renton, Gi reveals that he had to leave Italy due to homophobic abuse. Taking pity on Gi, Renton takes him to an all-night party.

Davie, now HIV-positive, gets revenge on Alan Venters, who he suspects raped his girlfriend and led to him contracting HIV, by befriending him, making him believe that he murdered and molested his son and then smothering him to death.

Renton, Spud, Begbie, Gav, Alison and others venture out for another drink and something to eat. The group reflect on their sex lives.

Kelly and Alison get into an argument with some sexist construction workers, then befriend a pair of backpacking lesbians from New Zealand.

Sick Boy prank calls Kelly at the pub where she works.

=== Section 6: Home ===
Spud, Begbie, and a teenager engage in a robbery. Spud later comments on Begbie's paranoia and how the teenager is likely to get ripped off by the pair.

Gav tells Renton the story of how Matty died of toxoplasmosis after attempting to rekindle his relationship with his ex using a kitten.

The group attends Matty's funeral and reflect on his downfall.

Renton is at a London flat surrounded by casual drug users. While they smoke marijuanah, Renton muses that they have no idea what drug addiction actually entails.

Kelly is working at a restaurant where she gets revenge on some unpleasant customers by tampering with their food.

Renton returns to Leith for Christmas and meets Begbie, who beats up an innocent man after having seen his alcoholic father in the disused Leith Central railway station.

Renton visits Tommy, who is dying of AIDS. Renton witnesses the patrons' laughter and compares it to a lynch mob.

Renton visits Swanney, who has had his leg amputated as a result of heroin use. Swanney begs in the street by pretending to be a veteran of the Falklands War.

=== Section 7: Exit ===
Renton, Sick Boy, Begbie, Spud and Second Prize go to London to engage in a heroin deal and see a Pogues gig. Renton steals the cash and goes to Amsterdam. Renton thinks that he will send Spud his cut, as he is the only 'innocent' party.

== Stage adaptation ==
Soon after publication, the book was adapted for the stage by Harry Gibson. The stage version inspired the subsequent film, and regularly toured the UK in the mid-1990s. This adaptation starred Ewen Bremner and later Tam Dean Burn as Renton.

The US stage premier occurred in San Francisco in 1996. It was produced and shown in the upstairs room (a tiny 50-seat theatre) at the Edinburgh Castle Pub, the small, but legendary literary and arts bar. The play was produced and directed by Alan Black, the head of the Scottish Cultural and Arts Foundation, which was an organization that held Scottish-connected events in San Francisco in the 90s. The play was a huge success. It was twice extended and hundreds of hopeful viewers had to be turned away because of a lack of space in the tiny theater above the pub.

The Los Angeles production won the 2002 Los Angeles Drama Critics Circle Award for Direction, and the 2002 LA Weekly Theater Award for Direction, for director Roger Mathey.

An adaptation for theatre was made in Brazil in 2002 by Pedro Osório and starring actor Arlindo Lopes as Tommy.

In 2013, In Your Face Theatre and Seabright Productions staged a new immersive production of Gibson's adaptation rebranded as Trainspotting Live. Directed by Adam Spreadbury-Maher and Greg Esplin, this production has gone on to sell out at three Edinburgh Festival Fringes and played to critical acclaim in London, on several UK tours and in New York City.

In 2026, a stage musical based on the novel written by Welsh with music and lyrics by Welsh and Stephen McGuinness will have its world premiere at the Theatre Royal Haymarket in London's West End in July 2026.

== Film adaptation ==
A film based on the novel was made, directed by Danny Boyle, with an adapted screenplay written by John Hodge. It starred Ewan McGregor, Robert Carlyle, Jonny Lee Miller and Ewen Bremner. Welsh made a cameo appearance as the drug dealer Mikey Forrester. The film was ranked 10th by the British Film Institute (BFI) in its list of Top 100 British films of all time. It also added to the phenomenal popularity of the novel.

In 2005, the chapter "Bad Blood" was adapted into a Canadian short film starring Alan Cumming as Davie Mitchell, Jim Shield as Alan Venters, and Claudette Mink as Frances. It premiered at the Tribeca Festival.

== Reception ==
Trainspotting was longlisted for the 1993 Booker Prize (and was apparently rejected for the shortlist after "offending the sensibilities of two judges").

Welsh said that the book had sold over one million copies in the UK by 2015, and had been translated into thirty languages.
