= List of awards and nominations received by Ewan McGregor =

Ewan McGregor awards and nominations
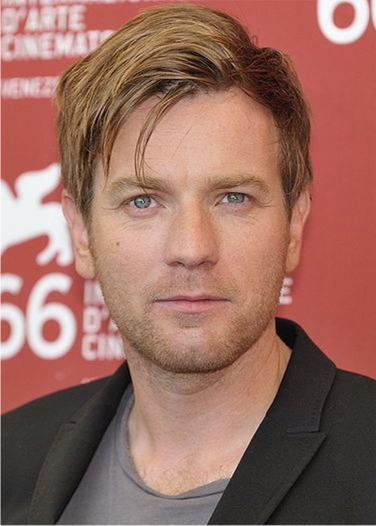
- McGregor at the 66th Venice International Film Festival
Awards and nominations
Award	Wins	Nominations
Golden Globe	1	5
Emmy Awards	1	6
MTV Movie & TV Awards	1	8
Screen Actors Guild Awards	0	3

Totals (Note: Certain award groups do not simply award one winner. They acknowledge several different recipients, have runners-up, and have third place. Since this is a specific recognition and is different from losing an award, runner-up mentions are considered wins in this award tally. For simplification and to avoid errors, each award in this list has been presumed to have had a prior nomination.)
- Wins: 29
- Nominations: 55

The following is a list of awards and nominations received by Scottish actor Ewan McGregor.

== Major awards ==
=== Actor Awards ===
Year	Nominated Work	Category	Results	Ref.
1999	Little Voice	Outstanding Performance by a Cast in a Motion Picture	Nominated	
2002	Moulin Rouge!	Outstanding Performance by a Cast in a Motion Picture	Nominated	
2014	August: Osage County	Outstanding Performance by a Cast in a Motion Picture	Nominated	
2022	Halston	Outstanding Performance by a Male Actor in a Miniseries or Television Movie	Nominated	

=== Daytime Emmy Awards ===
Year	Nominated Work	Category	Results	Ref.
2026	Long Way Home	Outstanding Travel and Adventure Program	Pending	

=== Golden Globes ===
Year	Nominated Work	Category	Results	Ref.
2002	Moulin Rouge!	Best Actor in a Motion Picture – Musical or Comedy	Nominated	
2013	Salmon Fishing in the Yemen	Best Actor in a Motion Picture – Musical or Comedy	Nominated	
2018	Fargo	Best Lead Actor in a Limited Series or a Motion Picture Made for Television	Won	
2022	Halston	Best Lead Actor in a Limited Series or a Motion Picture Made for Television	Nominated	
2025	A Gentleman in Moscow	Best Lead Actor in a Limited Series or a Motion Picture Made for Television	Nominated	

=== Primetime Emmy Awards ===
Year	Nominated Work	Category	Results	Ref.
1997	ER (episode: "The Long Way Around")	Outstanding Guest Actor in a Drama Series	Nominated	
2017	Highlands: Scotland's Wild Heart	Outstanding Narrator	Nominated	
2017	Fargo (season 3)	Outstanding Lead Actor in a Limited or Anthology Series or Movie	Nominated	
2021	Halston	Outstanding Lead Actor in a Limited or Anthology Series or Movie	Won	
2023	Obi-Wan Kenobi	Outstanding Limited or Anthology Series	Nominated	

== Audience awards ==
=== Golden Schmoes Awards ===
0 wins of 1 nomination

Year	Nominated Work	Category	Results	Ref.
2001	Moulin Rouge!	Best Actor of the Year	Nominated	

=== Kids' Choice Awards ===
0 wins of 1 nomination

Year	Nominated Work	Category	Results	Ref.
2023	Obi-Wan Kenobi	Favorite Male TV Star (Family)	Nominated	

=== MTV Movie + TV Awards ===
1 wins of 8 nominations

Year	Nominated Work	Category	Results	Ref.
1997	Trainspotting	Best Breakthrough Performance	Nominated	
1998	A Life Less Ordinary	Best Dance Sequence (shared with Cameron Diaz)	Nominated	
2000	Star Wars: Episode I - The Phantom Menace	Best Fight (shared with Liam Neeson & Ray Park)	Nominated	
2002	Moulin Rouge!	Best Kiss (shared with Nicole Kidman)	Nominated	
2002	Moulin Rouge!	Best Dance Sequence (shared with Nicole Kidman)	Won	
2006	Star Wars: Episode III - Revenge of the Sith	Best Hero	Nominated	
2006	Star Wars: Episode III - Revenge of the Sith	Best Fight (shared with Hayden Christensen)	Nominated	
2021	Birds of Prey	Best Villain	Nominated	

=== Teen Choice Awards ===
0 wins of 1 nomination

Year	Nominated Work	Category	Results	Ref.
2005	Star Wars: Episode III - Revenge of the Sith	Choice Movie - Rumble (shared with Matthew Wood)	Nominated	

== Critics associations awards ==
=== Awards Circuit Community Awards ===
0 wins of 2 nomination

Year	Nominated Work	Category	Results	Ref.
2001	Moulin Rouge!	Best Lead Actor	Nominated	
2001	Moulin Rouge!	Best Cast Ensemble	Nominated	

=== Chicago Film Critics Association Awards ===
0 wins of 1 nomination

Year	Nominated Work	Category	Results	Ref.
1997	Trainspotting	Most Promising Actor	Nominated	

=== Critics Choice Television Awards ===
1 win of 2 nominations

Year	Nominated Work	Category	Results	Ref.
2018	Fargo	Best Actor in a Movie Made for Television or Limited Series	Won	
2025	A Gentleman in Moscow	Best Actor in a Movie Made for Television or Limited Series	Nominated	

=== Detroit Film Critics Society Awards ===
0 wins of 1 nomination

Year	Nominated Work	Category	Results	Ref.
2012	The Impossible	Best Supporting Actor	Nominated	

=== Film Critics Circle Australia Awards ===
0 wins of 1 nomination

Year	Nominated Work	Category	Results	Ref.
2002	Moulin Rouge!	Best Actor - Male	Nominated	

=== Nevada Film Critics Society Awards ===
1 win of 1 nomination

Year	Nominated Work	Category	Results	Ref.
2013	August: Osage County	Best Ensemble Cast	Won	

=== Online Film & Television Association Awards ===
2 wins of 4 nominations

Year	Nominated Work	Category	Results	Ref.
2002	Moulin Rouge!	Best Music, Adapted Song for "Elephant Medley"	Nominated	
2002	Moulin Rouge!	Best Music, Adapted Song for "El Tango de Roxanne"	Won	
2002	Moulin Rouge!	Best Music, Original Song for "Come What May"	Won	
2017	Fargo	Best Actor in a Motion Picture or Limited Series	Nominated	

=== Phoenix Film Critics Society Awards ===
0 wins of 2 nominations

Year	Nominated Work	Category	Results	Ref.
2002	Black Hawk Down	Best Acting Ensemble	Nominated	
2013	August: Osage County	Best Acting Ensemble	Nominated	

=== Seattle Film Critics Awards ===
0 win of 1 nomination

Year	Nominated Work	Category	Results	Ref.
2014	August: Osage County	Best Ensemble Cast	Nominated	

=== St. Louis Film Critics Association Awards ===
1 win of 1 nomination

Year	Nominated Work	Category	Results	Ref.
2012	The Impossible	Special Merit	Won	

=== Washington DC Area Film Critics Association Awards ===
0 wins of 1 nomination

Year	Nominated Work	Category	Results	Ref.
2013	August: Osage County	Best Acting Ensemble	Nominated	

== Film festival awards ==
=== Capri Hollywood International Film Festival ===
1 win of 1 nomination

Year	Nominated Work	Category	Results	Ref.
2013	August: Osage County	Best Ensemble Cast	Won	

=== Hamburg Film Festival ===
0 wins of 1 nomination

Year	Nominated Work	Category	Results	Ref.
2016	American Pastoral	Best Feature	Nominated	

=== Hollywood Film Festival ===
2 wins of 2 nominations

Year	Nominated Work	Category	Results	Ref.
2001	Moulin Rouge! Black Hawk Down	Actor of the Year	Won	
2013	August: Osage County	Ensemble of the Year	Won	

=== San Sebastián International Film Festival ===
1 win of 2 nominations

Year	Nominated Work	Category	Results	Ref.
2012	—N/a	Donostia Lifetime Achievement Award	Won	
2016	American Pastoral	Best Film	Nominated	

== International awards ==
=== Australian Film Institute Awards ===
0 wins of 1 nomination

Year	Nominated Work	Category	Results	Ref.
2001	Moulin Rouge!	Best Lead Actor	Nominated	

=== BAFTA Scotland Awards ===
2 wins of 3 nominations

Year	Nominated Work	Category	Results	Ref.
1997	Trainspotting	Best Actor - Film	Won	
2004	Young Adam	Best Actor in a Scottish Film	Won	
2017	T2 Trainspotting	Best Actor - Film	Nominated	

=== BAFTA/LA Britannia Awards ===
1 win of 1 nomination

Year	Nominated Work	Category	Results	Ref.
2016	—N/a	Humanitarian Award	Won	

=== British Independent Awards ===
1 win of 2 nominations

Year	Nominated Work	Category	Results	Ref.
2002	—N/a	Variety Award	Won	
2003	Young Adam	Best Actor	Nominated	

=== CinEuphoria Awards ===
0 wins of 1 nomination

Year	Nominated Work	Category	Results	Ref.
2014	Lo imposible	Best Supporting Actor - International Competition	Nominated	

=== Empire Awards ===
5 wins of 6 nominations

Year	Nominated Work	Category	Results	Ref.
1996	Shallow Grave	Best British Actor	Won	
1997	Trainspotting	Best British Actor	Won	
1998	A Life Less Ordinary	Best British Actor	Won	
2002	Moulin Rouge!	Best British Actor	Won	
2004	Young Adam	Best British Actor	Nominated	
2008	—N/a	Icon Award	Won	

=== European Film Awards ===
2 wins of 2 nominations

Year	Nominated Work	Category	Results	Ref.
2001	Moulin Rouge!	Outstanding European Achievement in World Cinema	Won	
2010	The Ghost Writer	European Actor	Won	

=== Evening Standard British Film Awards ===
0 wins of 1 nomination

Year	Nominated Work	Category	Results	Ref.
2011	The Ghost Writer	Best Actor	Nominated	

=== Golden Camera Awards ===
1 win of 1 nomination

Year	Nominated Work	Category	Results	Ref.
2018	American Pastoral; T2 Trainspotting; Beauty and the Beast	Best International Actor	Won	

=== Goya Awards ===
0 wins of 1 nomination

Year	Nominated Work	Category	Results	Ref.
2013	The Impossible	Best Supporting Actor	Nominated	

=== Irish Film and Television Awards ===
0 wins of 1 nomination

Year	Nominated Work	Category	Results	Ref.
2000	Nora	Best Actor	Nominated	

=== London Critics' Circle Film Awards ===
1 win of 3 nominations

Year	Nominated Work	Category	Results	Ref.
1997	Trainspotting; Brassed Off; Emma; The Pillow Book	British Actor of the Year	Won	
2002	Moulin Rouge!	British Actor of the Year	Won	
2004	Young Adam	British Actor of the Year	Nominated	

=== Order of Arts and Letters France Awards ===
1 win of 1 nomination

Year	Nominated Work	Category	Results	Ref.
2010	—N/a	Knight of the Order of Arts and Letters	Won	

== Miscellaneous awards ==
=== 20/20 Awards ===
0 wins of 1 nomination

Year	Nominated Work	Category	Results	Ref.
2017	Trainspotting	Best Actor	Nominated	

=== Blockbuster Entertainment Awards ===
0 wins of 1 nomination

Year	Nominated Work	Category	Results	Ref.
2000	Star Wars: Episode I - The Phantom Menace	Favorite Actor - Action/Science Fiction	Nominated	

=== Gotham Awards ===
1 win of 1 nomination

Year	Nominated Work	Category	Results	Ref.
2011	Beginners	Best Ensemble Performance	Won	

=== Hollywood Critics Association TV Awards ===
0 wins of 1 nomination

Year	Nominated Work	Category	Results	Ref.
2024	Obi-Wan Kenobi	Best Actor in a Streaming Limited or Anthology Series or Movie	Nominated	

=== IF Awards ===
0 wins of 1 nomination

Year	Nominated Work	Category	Results	Ref.
2001	Moulin Rouge!	Best Actor	Nominated	

=== Satellite Awards ===
2 wins of 4 nominations

Year	Nominated Work	Category	Results	Ref.
2002	Moulin Rouge!	Best Actor in a Motion Picture - Comedy or Musical	Won	
2017	Fargo	Best Actor in a Series - Drama/Genre	Nominated	
2017	Fargo	Best Actor in a Miniseries or a Motion Picture Made for Television	Nominated	
2021	Halston	Best Actor in a Miniseries or a Motion Picture Made for Television	Won	

=== Saturn Awards ===
0 wins of 3 nominations

Year	Nominated Work	Category	Results	Ref.
2000	Star Wars: Episode I - The Phantom Menace	Best Supporting Actor	Nominated	
2021	Doctor Sleep	Best Actor	Nominated	
2022	Obi-Wan Kenobi	Best Actor in a Streaming Television Series	Nominated	

=== Village Voice Film Poll Awards ===
0 wins of 1 nomination

Year	Nominated Work	Category	Results	Ref.
2010	The Ghost Writer	Best Actor	Nominated	
