= Ewan McGregor filmography =

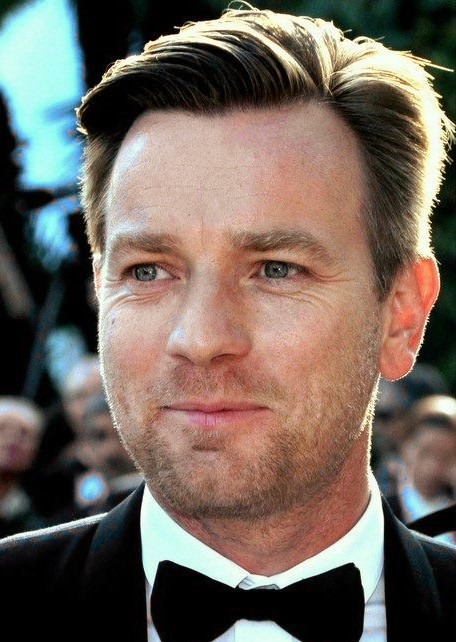
McGregor in 2012

Scottish actor Ewan McGregor made his debut in 1993 in the British television series Lipstick on Your Collar. He followed this one year later by appearing in Bill Forsyth's Being Human and Danny Boyle's thriller Shallow Grave. Two years later, he played heroin addict Mark Renton in Danny Boyle's Trainspotting which won him international recognition.

In 1999, he played the Jedi Obi-Wan Kenobi in the first of the Star Wars prequel trilogy Star Wars: Episode I – The Phantom Menace; the character was originally played by Alec Guinness in the first Star Wars trilogy. He played the role again in its sequels Star Wars: Episode II – Attack of the Clones (2002), and Star Wars: Episode III – Revenge of the Sith (2005).

For his role as Christian in the 2001 musical Moulin Rouge! he received his first nomination for a Golden Globe, for Best Actor – Motion Picture Musical or Comedy. Eleven years later, he was nominated for Salmon Fishing in the Yemen (2012), in the same category. In 2010, McGregor's performance as the Ghost Writer in Roman Polanski's psychological thriller The Ghost Writer won the European Film Award for Best Actor. In 2016, McGregor made his directorial feature film debut in American Pastoral. He reprised the role as Renton in the sequel film T2 Trainspotting (2017).

== Film ==
Key
| † | Denotes works that have not yet been released |

| Year | Title | Role | Notes |
|---|---|---|---|
| 1994 | Being Human | Alvarez | |
| 1994 | Shallow Grave | Alex Law | |
| 1995 | Blue Juice | Dean Raymond | |
| 1996 | Trainspotting | Mark Renton | |
| 1996 | The Pillow Book | Jerome | |
| 1996 | Emma | Frank Churchill | |
| 1996 | Brassed Off | Andy Barrow | |
| 1997 | Nightwatch | Martin Bells | |
| 1997 | The Serpent's Kiss | Meneer Chrome | |
| 1997 | A Life Less Ordinary | Robert Lewis | |
| 1998 | Desserts | Stroller | Short film |
| 1998 | Velvet Goldmine | Curt Wild | |
| 1998 | Little Voice | Billy | |
| 1999 | Star Wars: Episode I – The Phantom Menace | Obi-Wan Kenobi | |
| 1999 | Rogue Trader | Nick Leeson | |
| 1999 | Eye of the Beholder | Stephen Wilson/The Eye | |
| 1999 | Tube Tales | None | Director: segment "Bone" |
| 2000 | Anno Donimi | The Stranger | Short film |
| 2000 | Nora | James Joyce | Also co-producer |
| 2001 | Moulin Rouge! | Christian | |
| 2001 | Black Hawk Down | SPC John Grimes | |
| 2002 | Star Wars: Episode II – Attack of the Clones | Obi-Wan Kenobi | |
| 2002 | Solid Geometry | Phil | Short film |
| 2003 | Down with Love | Catcher Block | |
| 2003 | Young Adam | Joe Taylor | |
| 2003 | Faster | Narrator | Voice |
| 2003 | Big Fish | Young Edward Bloom | |
| 2004 | Faster & Faster | Narrator | Voice |
| 2005 | Robots | Rodney Copperbottom | Voice |
| 2005 | Star Wars: Episode III – Revenge of the Sith | Obi-Wan Kenobi | |
| 2005 | Valiant | Valiant | Voice |
| 2005 | The Island | Lincoln Six Echo / Tom Lincoln | |
| 2005 | Stay | Dr. Sam Foster | |
| 2006 | Stormbreaker | Ian Rider | |
| 2006 | Scenes of a Sexual Nature | Billy | |
| 2006 | Miss Potter | Norman Warne | |
| 2007 | Cassandra's Dream | Ian Blane | |
| 2008 | Incendiary | Jasper Black | |
| 2008 | Deception | Jonathan McQuarry | |
| 2009 | Angels & Demons | Camerlengo Father Patrick McKenna | |
| 2009 | I Love You Phillip Morris | Phillip Morris | |
| 2009 | The Men Who Stare at Goats | Bob Wilton | |
| 2009 | Amelia | Gene Vidal | |
| 2010 | The Ghost Writer | The Ghost Writer | |
| 2010 | Nanny McPhee and the Big Bang | Rory Green | |
| 2010 | Jackboots on Whitehall | Chris | Voice |
| 2010 | Beginners | Oliver Fields | |
| 2011 | Perfect Sense | Michael | |
| 2011 | Fastest | Narrator | Voice |
| 2011 | Haywire | Kenneth | |
| 2012 | Salmon Fishing in the Yemen | Dr. Alfred Jones | |
| 2012 | The Impossible | Henry Bennett | |
| 2013 | Jack the Giant Slayer | Elmont | |
| 2013 | August: Osage County | Bill Fordham | |
| 2014 | A Million Ways to Die in the West | Cowboy at Fair | Cameo |
| 2014 | Son of a Gun | Brendan Lynch | |
| 2015 | Mortdecai | Inspector Alistair Martland | |
| 2015 | Last Days in the Desert | Yeshua / Satan | |
| 2015 | Miles Ahead | Dave Brill | |
| 2015 | Star Wars: The Force Awakens | Obi-Wan Kenobi | Voice cameo |
| 2016 | Jane Got a Gun | John Bishop | |
| 2016 | Our Kind of Traitor | Peregrine "Perry" Makepeace | |
| 2016 | American Pastoral | Seymour "Swede" Levov | Also director |
| 2017 | T2 Trainspotting | Mark Renton | |
| 2017 | Beauty and the Beast | Lumière | also voice |
| 2018 | Christopher Robin | Christopher Robin | |
| 2018 | Zoe | Cole | |
| 2019 | Doctor Sleep | Danny "Dan" Torrance | |
| 2019 | Star Wars: The Rise of Skywalker | Obi-Wan Kenobi | Voice cameo |
| 2020 | Birds of Prey | Roman Sionis / Black Mask | |
| 2021 | The Birthday Cake | Father Kelly | |
| 2022 | Raymond & Ray | Raymond | |
| 2022 | Guillermo del Toro's Pinocchio | Sebastian J. Cricket | Voice |
| 2023 | Bleeding Love | Father | |
| 2023 | Speed Is Expensive: Philip Vincent and the Million Dollar Motorcycle | Narrator | Voice |
| 2023 | Mother, Couch | David | |
| 2026 | The Land of Sometimes | The Wish Collector | Voice |
| 2026 | The End of Oak Street | Greg Platt | |

== Television ==
| Year | Title | Role | Notes |
|---|---|---|---|
| 1993 | Lipstick on Your Collar | PTE Mick Hopper | 6 episodes |
| 1993 | Scarlet and Black | Julien Sorel | 4 episodes |
| 1994 | Doggin Around | Tom Clayton | Television film |
| 1995 | Kavanagh QC | David Robert Armstrong | Episode: "Nothing But the Truth" |
| 1996 | Karaoke | Young Man | Episode: "Tuesday" |
| 1996 | Tales from the Crypt | Ford | Episode: "Cold War" |
| 1997 | ER | Duncan Stewart | Episode: "The Long Way Around" |
| 2002 | The Polar Bears of Churchill with Ewan McGregor | Himself | Documentary series |
| 2004 | Long Way Round | Himself | Documentary series |
| 2007 | Long Way Down | Himself | Documentary series |
| 2010 | The Battle of Britain | Himself | Documentary |
| 2012 | Ewan McGregor: Cold Chain Mission | Himself | Documentary |
| 2012 | Bomber Boys | Himself | Documentary |
| 2012 | The Corrections | Chip Lambert | Unaired pilot |
| 2013 | Hebrides: Islands on the Edge | Narrator | Documentary series |
| 2015 | Doll & Em | Himself | 2 episodes |
| 2016 | Highlands: Scotland's Wild Heart | Narrator | Documentary series |
| 2017 | Fargo | Emmit Stussy / Ray Stussy | 10 episodes |
| 2018 | RAF at 100 | Himself | Documentary with his brother, RAF pilot Colin McGregor, on the centenary of the RAF. BBC. |
| 2019–2020 | Star Wars Galaxy of Adventures | Obi-Wan Kenobi | Voice; 2 episodes (archive material) |
| 2020 | Long Way Up | Himself | Documentary series |
| 2021 | Halston | Halston | 5 episodes |
| 2021 | Jerusalem: City of Faith and Fury | Narrator | Documentary series |
| 2022 | Obi-Wan Kenobi | Obi-Wan Kenobi | 6 episodes; also executive producer |
| 2024 | A Gentleman in Moscow | Count Alexander Rostov | 8 episodes |
| 2025 | Long Way Home | Himself | Documentary series |
| 2026 | Star Wars: Maul – Shadow Lord | Obi-Wan Kenobi | Voice; episode: "The Creeping Fear" (archive material) |

== Theatre ==
| Year | Title | Role | Venue |
|---|---|---|---|
| 1998 | Little Malcolm and His Struggle Against the Eunuchs | Joe Orton | Hampstead Theatre, London |
| 2005 | Guys and Dolls | Sky Masterson | Piccadilly Theatre, London |
| 2007 | Othello | Iago | Donmar Warehouse, London |
| 2014 | The Real Thing | Henry | American Airlines Theatre, New York |
| 2025 | My Master Builder | Henry Solness | Wyndham's Theatre, London |

== Video game ==
| Year | Title | Role | Notes | Refs. |
|---|---|---|---|---|
| 2008 | Star Wars: The Force Unleashed | Obi-Wan Kenobi | PSP version only | |

== See also ==
- List of awards and nominations received by Ewan McGregor
