= Moulin Rouge! Music from Baz Luhrmann's Film, Vol. 2 =

Soundtrack album by Various Artists
- Released: 26 February 2002
- Recorded: 2001
- Genre: Soundtrack
- Label: Interscope
- Producer: BLAM, Craig Armstrong, Josh G. Abrahams, Marius de Vries, Steve Sharples

Moulin Rouge original soundtrack chronology
Moulin Rouge! Music from Baz Luhrmann's Film (2001)	Moulin Rouge! Music from Baz Luhrmann's Film, Vol. 2 (2002)

Singles from Moulin Rouge! Music from Baz Luhrmann's Film, Vol. 2
- 1. "One Day I'll Fly Away" Released: 5 April 2002

Professional ratings
Review scores
Source	Rating
Allmusic	3/5 stars
MTV Asia	7/10 stars

Moulin Rouge! Music from Baz Luhrmann's Film, Vol. 2 is a soundtrack album to Baz Luhrmann's 2001 film Moulin Rouge! It was released on February 26, 2002. It is the follow-up to the original soundtrack, which was released a year prior. The album features original film versions of some songs, remixes and instrumentals.

== Track listing ==
#	Title	Performer(s)	Length
1	"Your Song" (Instrumental from the "Rehearsal Montage" scene)	Craig Armstrong	2:28
2	"Sparkling Diamonds" (Original film version)	Nicole Kidman, Jim Broadbent and Lara Mulcahy	2:52
3	"One Day I'll Fly Away" (Tony Philips remix)	Nicole Kidman	5:10
4	"The Pitch (Spectacular Spectacular)" (Original film version)	Jim Broadbent, Nicole Kidman, Jacek Koman, John Leguizamo, Ewan McGregor, Garry McDonald, Richard Roxburgh and Matthew Whittet	2:50
5	"Come What May" (Original film version)	Nicole Kidman and Ewan McGregor	4:38
6	"Like a Virgin" (Original film version)	Jim Broadbent, Richard Roxburgh and Anthony Weigh	3:10
7	"Meet Me in the Red Room" (Original film version)	Amiel Daemion	2:38
8	"Your Song" (Instrumental from the "After the Storm" scene)	Craig Armstrong	4:55
9	"The Show Must Go On" (Original film version)	Jim Broadbent, Nicole Kidman and Anthony Weigh	3:04
10	"Ascension" / "Nature Boy"	Ewan McGregor	4:09
11	"Bolero (Closing Credits)" (Original film version)	Steve Sharples	6:53

== Charts ==
Chart performance for Moulin Rouge! Music from Baz Luhrmann's Film, Vol. 2
Chart (2002)	Peak position
Austrian Albums (Ö3 Austria)	74
French Albums (SNEP)	133
German Albums (Offizielle Top 100)	85
US Billboard 200	90
US Soundtrack Albums (Billboard)	9

== Release history ==
Region	Date	Label	Format(s)	Catalog
United States, Europe	26 February 2002	Interscope Records	CD	493228-2
