= Moulin Rouge! Music from Baz Luhrmann's Film =

Soundtrack album by various artists
- Released: 8 May 2001
- Recorded: September 2000 – March 2001
- Length: 56:53
- Labels: Interscope; Bazmark; Fox
- Producer: Baz Luhrmann

Moulin Rouge! soundtrack chronology
Moulin Rouge! Music from Baz Luhrmann's Film (2001)	Moulin Rouge! Music from Baz Luhrmann's Film, Vol. 2 (2002)

Singles from Moulin Rouge! Music from Baz Luhrmann's Film
- 1. "Lady Marmalade" Released: 10 April 2001; 2. "Come What May" Released: 24 September 2001

Alternative cover
- North American and Australian cover

Professional ratings
Review scores
Source	Rating
AllMusic	3/5 stars
Slant Magazine	3/5 stars

Moulin Rouge! Music from Baz Luhrmann's Film is the soundtrack album to Baz Luhrmann's 2001 film Moulin Rouge!, released on 8 May 2001 by Interscope Records. The album features most of the songs featured in the film. However, some of the songs are alternate versions and there are two or three major songs that were left off. The original film versions and extra songs were featured on the second soundtrack.

== Songs ==
The soundtrack consists almost entirely of cover versions—"Come What May", composed by David Baerwald and Kevin Gilbert, is the only original song on the album. The opening track, "Nature Boy", is performed by David Bowie, though in the film the song is performed by actor John Leguizamo as the character Henri de Toulouse-Lautrec. Originally by American singer-songwriter eden ahbez, the song is reprised as the last song on the soundtrack with performances by Bowie and Massive Attack, along with a dialogue by Nicole Kidman.

"Lady Marmalade", written by Bob Crewe and Kenny Nolan, was made famous in the 1970s by the girl group Labelle. The song contains the sexually suggestive lyric "Voulez-vous coucher avec moi, ce soir?", which translates to "Do you want to sleep with me tonight?" Labelle's version of the song was inducted into the Grammy Hall of Fame in 2003. The version for the soundtrack is performed by Christina Aguilera, Lil' Kim, Mýa, and Pink, with production and additional vocal credits by Missy Elliott. The song topped the Billboard Hot 100 in the United States and earned a Grammy Award for Best Pop Collaboration with Vocals.

"Because We Can" is credited to Norman Cook, with performance and production credits given to his stage name Fatboy Slim. The song contains portions of "Zidler's Rap", performed in the film by Jim Broadbent as the character Harold Zidler, and has been called the "'Can Can' for the next generation". "Sparkling Diamonds" is performed by Kidman, Broadbent, Caroline O'Connor, Natalie Mendoza and Lara Mulcahy. The song is a medley featuring "Diamonds Are a Girl's Best Friend", written by Jule Styne and Leo Robin and introduced by Carol Channing in the Broadway production of Gentlemen Prefer Blondes (1949), and "Material Girl" by Madonna. "Rhythm of the Night" was made famous in 1985 by the American R&B group DeBarge. The track reached number one on the Billboard Hot R&B chart and number three on the Billboard Hot 100, and is said to have "jumpstarted" the career of songwriter Diane Warren. The soundtrack version is performed by Valeria, and includes a dialogue by Kidman.

== Commercial performance ==
Moulin Rouge! Music from Baz Luhrmann's Film debuted on the US Billboard 200 at number five on 16 May 2001. Four weeks later, the album reach its peak position at number three. The soundtrack reached number one on the Top Soundtracks chart and number 33 on the Top Pop Catalog chart. On 23 April 2002, it was certified double platinum by the Recording Industry Association of America (RIAA).

In Australia, the soundtrack debuted on the albums chart at number four on 11 May 2001. The following week, it reached number one and remained there for 11 consecutive weeks and upon the albums chart for 58 weeks. It was the highest-selling album of 2001 in Australia and has been certified five-times platinum by the Australian Recording Industry Association (ARIA). Moulin Rouge! Music from Baz Luhrmann's Film also reached number one in New Zealand, where it remained on the albums chart for 16 weeks. The soundtrack reached the top five in Austria, Denmark, France, and Norway. In 2001, the album was the 20th best-selling album globally, selling four million copies.

== Track listing ==
Moulin Rouge! Music from Baz Luhrmann's Film track listing
No.	Title	Writer(s)	Producer(s)	Length
1.	"Nature Boy" (performed by David Bowie)	Eden Ahbez	BLAM; Josh G. Abrahams; Craig Armstrong	3:25
2.	"Lady Marmalade" (performed by Christina Aguilera, Lil' Kim, Mýa and Pink)	Bob Crewe; Kenny Nolan	Missy Elliott; Rockwilder; Ron Fair^{[a]}	4:24
3.	"Because We Can" (performed by Fatboy Slim)	Norman Cook	Fatboy Slim; Marius de Vries^{[a]}	3:27
4.	"Sparkling Diamonds" (performed by Nicole Kidman, Jim Broadbent, Caroline O'Connor, Natalie Mendoza and Lara Mulcahy)	"Diamonds Are a Girl's Best Friend": Jule Styne; Leo Robin; "Material Girl": Peter H. Brown; Robert Rans	BLAM; Abrahams; Armstrong; de Vries; Simon Franglen^{[b]}	2:52
5.	"Rhythm of the Night" (performed by Valeria Andrews)	Diane Warren	BLAM; Abrahams; de Vries; Alexis Smith; Franglen^{[b]}	3:49
6.	"Your Song" (performed by Ewan McGregor and Alessandro Safina)	Elton John; Bernie Taupin	BLAM; Abrahams; Armstrong; de Vries; Patrick Leonard; Franglen^{[b]}	3:38
7.	"Children of the Revolution" (performed by Bono, Gavin Friday and Maurice Seezer)	Marc Bolan	Richard "Biff" Stannard; Julian Gallagher; Bono; Friday; Seezer	2:59
8.	"One Day I'll Fly Away" (performed by Nicole Kidman)	Will Jennings; Joe Sample	BLAM; Abrahams; Armstrong; de Vries; Franglen^{[b]}	3:18
9.	"Diamond Dogs" (performed by Beck)	Bowie	Timbaland	4:34
10.	"Elephant Love Medley" (performed by Nicole Kidman, Ewan McGregor and Jamie Allen)	"All You Need Is Love": John Lennon; Paul McCartney; "I Was Made for Lovin' You": Paul Stanley; Desmond Child; Vini Poncia; "One More Night": Phil Collins: "Pride (In the Name of Love)": U2 (music) / Bono; the Edge (lyrics); "Don't Leave Me This Way": Kenneth Gamble; Leon Huff; Cary Gilbert; "Silly Love Songs": McCartney: "Up Where We Belong": Jack Nitzsche; Buffy Sainte-Marie; Will Jennings; "'Heroes'": Bowie; Brian Eno; "I Will Always Love You": Dolly Parton: "Your Song": John; Taupin	BLAM; Abrahams; Armstrong; de Vries; Franglen^{[b]}	4:13
11.	"Come What May" (performed by Nicole Kidman and Ewan McGregor)	David Baerwald; Kevin Gilbert	David Foster; Franglen; de Vries^{[b]}; Armstrong^{[c]}	4:48
12.	"El Tango de Roxanne" (performed by Ewan McGregor, José Feliciano and Jacek Koman)	"Roxanne": Sting: "Le Tango du Moulin Rouge": Marianito Mores; Baz Luhrmann; Craig Pearce	BLAM; Abrahams; Armstrong; de Vries; Franglen^{[b]}	4:43
13.	"Complainte de la Butte" (performed by Rufus Wainwright)	Georges Van Parys; Jean Renoir	Michel Pépin; Wainwright	3:07
14.	"Hindi Sad Diamonds" (performed by Nicole Kidman, John Leguizamo and Alka Yagnik)	"Chamma Chamma": Sameer: "Diamonds Are a Girl's Best Friend": Styne; Robin; "The Hindi": Steve Sharples	BLAM; de Vries; Sharples; Franglen^{[b]}	3:28
15.	"Nature Boy" (performed by David Bowie and Massive Attack)	Ahbez	Robert "3D" Del Naja; Neil Davidge; Armstrong	4:08
Total length:				56:53

Australian edition bonus track
No.	Title	Writer(s)	Producer(s)	Length
16.	"Come What May" (Josh G. Abrahams mix) (performed by Nicole Kidman and Ewan McGregor)	Baerwald	BLAM; Abrahams^{[d]}; de Vries	4:38
Total length:				61:31

Bonus track on Chilean edition and select European editions
No.	Title	Writer(s)	Producer(s)	Length
16.	"Lady Marmalade" (Thunderpuss radio mix) (performed by Christina Aguilera, Lil' Kim, Mýa and Pink)	Crewe; Nolan	Missy Elliott; Rockwilder; Fair^{[a]}; Thunderpuss^{[e]}	4:09
Total length:				61:02

=== Notes ===
- ^{^[a]} signifies a vocal producer
- ^{^[b]} signifies an additional vocal producer
- ^{^[c]} signifies an orchestral producer
- ^{^[d]} signifies a main producer, additional producer and remixer
- ^{^[e]} signifies a remixer

== Personnel ==
- Josh G. Abrahams – producer (1, 4–6, 8, 10, 12)
- Pink – performer (2)
- Christina Aguilera – performer (2)
- Jamie Allen – performer (10)
- Valeria Andrews – performer (5)
- Craig Armstrong – producer (1, 4, 6, 8, 10, 12, 15), orchestra production (11), arranger (6, 8, 10, 12)
- John "Beetle" Bailey – assistant engineer
- Chris Barrett – assistant engineer
- Beck – performer (9)
- BLAM – producer (1, 4–6, 8, 10, 12, 14)
- Bono – guitar (7), arranger (7), performer (7), producer (7)
- David Bowie – performer (1, 15)
- Andy Bradfield – mixing (1, 6, 8, 12, 14)
- Jim Broadbent – performer (3–4)
- Neil Davidge – mixing (15), producer (15)
- Marius de Vries – vocal producer (3–6, 8, 10–12, 14), music direction
- Robert "3D" Del Naja – mixing (15), producer (15)
- Jimmy Douglas – engineer (9), mixing (9)
- Dylan Dresdow – engineer (2)
- Felipe Elgueta – engineer (11)
- Chris Elliott – arranger (10, 12), conductor
- Missy Elliott – producer (2), vocals (2)
- Ron Fair – vocal producer (2)
- Fatboy Slim – performer (3), producer (3)
- José Feliciano – performer (12)
- David Foster – producer (11)
- Geoff Foster – engineer (1, 4–6, 8, 10–12, 14)
- Simon Franglen – engineer (4–6, 8, 10–12, 14), vocal production assistance (4–6, 8, 10, 12, 14), producer (11)
- Ryan Freeland – mixing (5)
- Gavin Friday – arranger (7), producer (7), performer (7)
- Julian Gallagher – keyboards (7), producer (7)
- Humberto Gatica – mixing (11)
- Ricky Graham – assistant engineer
- Isobel Griffiths – orchestra contractor
- Brad Haehnel – mixing (4,10)
- Ash Howes – programming (7), engineer (7)
- Jake Jackson – assistant engineer
- Nicole Kidman – performer (4, 8, 10–11, 14), dialogue (5, 15)
- Michael Knobloch – music production supervisor
- Jacek Koman – performer (12)
- Robert Kraft – executive in charge of music
- Joe Leguabe – performer
- Patrick Leonard – producer (6)
- Lil' Kim – performer (2)
- John Leguizamo – performer (14)
- Baz Luhrmann – producer (12)
- Massive Attack – performer (15)
- Ewan McGregor – dialogue (1), performer (6, 10–12)
- Natalie Mendoza – performer (4)
- Anton Monsted – music supervisor, executive music producer
- Lara Mulcahy – performer (4)
- Don Murnaghan – engineer (13)
- Mýa – performer (2)
- Andy Nelson – mixing (10)
- Caroline O'Connor – performer (4)
- Jennie O'Grady – choir master
- Ozzy Osbourne – performer
- Dave Pensado – mixing (2)
- Michel Pepin – engineer (13), mixing (13), producer (13)
- Mickey Petralia – engineer (9)
- Dave Reitzas – engineer (11)
- Carmen Rizzo – engineer
- Michael C. Ross – engineer (2)
- Alessandro Safina – performer (6)
- Steve Sharples – arranger (14), producer (14)
- Eddy Schreyer – mastering
- Maurice Seezer – guitar (7), arranger (7), keyboards (7), programming (7), producer (7), engineer (7), performer (7)
- Steve Sidwell – arranger (4), horn arrangements (5)
- Alexis Smith – producer (5)
- Brian Springer – engineer (2)
- Richard Stannard – guitar (7), keyboards (7), producer (7)
- Alvin Sweeney – engineer (7)
- Timbaland – producer (9), mixing (9)
- Simon Thornton – engineer (3)
- Tony Visconti – vocals (1)
- Rufus Wainwright – performer (13), producer (13)
- Gavyn Wright – orchestra leader
- Alka Yagnik – performer (14)
- Laura Ziffren – music supervisor, executive music producer
- Joel Zifkin – violin (13)

== Charts ==
=== Weekly charts ===
Weekly chart performance for Moulin Rouge! Music from Baz Luhrmann's Film
Chart (2001–2002)	Peak position
Australian Albums (ARIA)	1
Austrian Albums (Ö3 Austria)	4
Belgian Albums (Ultratop Flanders)	3
Belgian Albums (Ultratop Wallonia)	2
Brazilian Albums (Nopem)	4
Canadian Albums (Billboard)	2
Czech Albums (ČNS IFPI)	10
Danish Albums (Hitlisten)	4
Dutch Albums (Album Top 100)	22
European Albums (Music & Media)	5
Finnish Albums (Suomen virallinen lista)	10
French Albums (SNEP)	4
German Albums (Offizielle Top 100)	6
Greek International Albums (IFPI)	2
Hungarian Albums (MAHASZ)	1
New Zealand Albums (RMNZ)	1
Norwegian Albums (VG-lista)	5
Polish Albums (ZPAV)	7
Spanish Albums (AFYVE)	5
Swedish Albums (Sverigetopplistan)	6
Swiss Albums (Schweizer Hitparade)	13
UK Compilation Albums (Official Charts)	2
UK Compilation Albums (Official Charts) Collector's Edition	9
UK Soundtrack Albums (Official Charts)	3
UK Soundtrack Albums (Official Charts) Collector's Edition	1
US Billboard 200	3
US Soundtrack Albums (Billboard)	1

=== Year-end charts ===
2001 year-end chart performance for Moulin Rouge! Music from Baz Luhrmann's Film
Chart (2001)	Position
Australian Albums (ARIA)	1
Austrian Albums (Ö3 Austria)	49
Belgian Albums (Ultratop Flanders)	43
Belgian Albums (Ultratop Wallonia)	56
Canadian Albums (Nielsen SoundScan)	36
European Albums (Music & Media)	67
French Albums (SNEP)	72
New Zealand Albums (RMNZ)	26
Spanish Albums (AFYVE)	41
Swedish Albums (Sverigetopplistan)	37
Swiss Albums (Schweizer Hitparade)	94
US Billboard 200	50
US Soundtrack Albums (Billboard)	4
Worldwide Albums (IFPI)	25

2002 year-end chart performance for Moulin Rouge! Music from Baz Luhrmann's Film
Chart (2002)	Position
Australian Albums (ARIA)	45
Belgian Albums (Ultratop Flanders)	75
Canadian Albums (Nielsen SoundScan)	71
French Albums (SNEP)	136
US Billboard 200	109
US Soundtrack Albums (Billboard)	6

=== Decade-end charts ===
Decade-end chart performance for Moulin Rouge! Music from Baz Luhrmann's Film
Chart (2000–2009)	Position
Australian Albums (ARIA)	40

== Certifications and sales ==
Certifications and sales for Moulin Rouge! Music from Baz Luhrmann's Film
Region	Certification	Certified units/sales
Australia (ARIA)	5× Platinum	350,000^{^}
Belgium (BRMA)	Gold	25,000^{*}
Brazil (Pro-Música Brasil)	Gold	50,000^{*}
Canada (Music Canada)	Gold	50,000^{^}
Denmark (IFPI Danmark)	Gold	25,000^{^}
France (SNEP)	Gold	100,000^{*}
Greece (IFPI Greece)	Gold	15,000^{^}
New Zealand (RMNZ)	Platinum	15,000^{^}
Spain (Promusicae)	Platinum	130,000
Sweden (GLF)	Gold	40,000^{^}
Switzerland (IFPI Switzerland)	Gold	20,000^{^}
United Kingdom (BPI)	Platinum	300,000^{^}
United Kingdom (BPI) Collector's Edition	Gold	100,000^{^}
United States (RIAA)	2× Platinum	3,200,000
Summaries
Europe (IFPI)	2× Platinum	2,000,000^{*}
^{*} Sales figures based on certification alone.^{^} Shipments figures based on certification alone.

== Release history ==
Release history and formats for Moulin Rouge! Music from Baz Luhrmann's Film
Region	Date	Label	Format(s)	Catalog
United States, Europe	8 May 2001	Interscope	CD; digital download; double vinyl album	490507-2
