= China Gate (1998 film) =

1998 Indian film by Rajkumar Santoshi

- Directed by: Rajkumar Santoshi
- Screenplay by: Rajkumar Santoshi; Anjum Rajabali; K. K. Raina
- Story by: Rajkumar Santoshi
- Produced by: Rajkumar Santoshi
- Starring: Om Puri; Naseeruddin Shah; Danny Denzongpa; Amrish Puri; Mukesh Tiwari; Mamta Kulkarni; Samir Soni; Kulbhushan Kharbanda; Paresh Rawal; Tinu Anand; Jagdeep; Viju Khote; Anjan Srivastav
- Cinematography: Piyush Shah
- Edited by: V. N. Mayekar
- Music by: Songs: Anu Malik; Score: Vanraj Bhatia
- Production company: Santoshi Productions
- Release date: 27 November 1998
- Running time: 175 minutes
- Country: India
- Language: Hindi
- Budget: ₹13 crore
- Box office: ₹18.9 crore (India Net Collection) ₹33 −37 crore (Worldwide Collection)

China Gate is a 1998 Indian Hindi-language revisionist Western action film directed by Rajkumar Santoshi. It was released on 27 November 1998. China Gate follows the basic storyline of the Seven Samurai. The song "Chamma Chamma" picturised on Urmila Matondkar became a chart buster and was used in Baz Luhrmann's film Moulin Rouge!. The film won Filmfare Award for Best Dialogue. The film was moderately successful at the domestic box office especially due to the excellent box office collections in Small Cities, towns and village areas across North India.

== Plot ==
Colonel Krishnakant Puri and ten men from his unit were dishonourably discharged from the Indian Army for failing in a critical mission. Krishnakant challenged the decision of the military high command and pursued the case in civil courts for 17 years, but the final verdict is given against him and his team. Frustrated, he is about to commit suicide when a young lady named Sandhya knocks on his door.

Having witnessed the brutal murder of her father, Forest Officer Sunder Rajan, at the hands of dreaded dacoit Jageera, Sandhya has come to the Colonel to ask for his assistance in bringing an end to Jageera's reign of terror in the Devdurg region. Krishnakant agrees to assist her and summons his fellow disgraced officers and subordinates to assist him in this mission. They assemble at Devdurg with the necessary ammunition and arms to combat Jageera, not realising that Jageera has influence over the local police, who try to prevent Krishnakant and his men to possess any guns and weapons. This does not deter the men, and they continue to stay on in Devdurg. They gain the confidence of the villagers too.

The villagers do not know that Krishnakant and his men had been dishonorably discharged from the army for what was perceived as cowardice. At the time of the first encounter with Jageera and his gang, Krishnakant and his team realise that they are out of shape and have lost instincts and fighting capabilities due to age. With Krishnakant's permission, Major Gurung starts to train them again.

One day, Jageera captures them with the help of corrupt police officer Barot, but they escape and, in turn, capture Jageera. Colonel Keval Krishan Puri and a few other officers intend to kill him, but Krishnakant hands him over to Barot. As a result, Jageera is again set free and kills Major Sarfaraz. This causes Krishnakant to go full force against Jageera, and he and the other officers, with support from the villagers, chase Jageera to seek revenge. Krishnakant learns that Sandhya and the rest of the residents are held hostage by Jageera. Udit is able to save her. After a deadly fight, the soldiers including an outraged Keval kill Jageera to avenge Sarfaraz's death and end his reign of terror.

The film ends with the remaining team getting felicitated and praised by Brigadier Anoop Kumar, who expresses pride even though he had court-martialed them. The team eventually sets out for their next adventure to accomplish a new mission, and Udit becomes Sandhya's husband as well, later joining the Army and following his father's footsteps.

== Cast ==
- Om Puri as Colonel Krishnakant Puri (Regiment of Artillery)
- Naseeruddin Shah as Major Sarfaraz Khan (Grenadiers)
- Danny Denzongpa as Major Ranjit Singh Gurung (Sharpshooter) (Gorkha Rifles)
- Amrish Puri as Lieutenant Colonel Keval Krishan Puri (Grenadiers)
- Samir Soni as Uditanshu "Udit" Tandon
- Kulbhushan Kharbanda as Major Kulbhushan Gupta (Grenadiers)(Planner)
- Tinu Anand as Captain Bijon Dasgupta (Batchmate of Major Gurung from NDA) (Explosive Expert) (Corps of Engineers)
- Viju Khote as Nb Subedar Ghanshyam (Regiment of Artillery) (Gunner)
- Jagdeep as Havaldar (Grenadiers) Ramaiyah
- Anjan Srivastav as Havaldar (Grenadiers) Havaldar Dharti Kumar Pandey
- K D Chandran as Doctor Ambi (Army Medical Corps)
- Mukesh Tiwari as Jageera
- Paresh Rawal as Inspector Baarot
- Ila Arun as Gopinath's wife
- Shivaji Satam as Gopinath (Village Sarpanch)
- Razak Khan as Sadhuram (Lali's Uncle)
- Anupam Kher as Brigadier Anoop Kumar / Governor (Special appearance)
- Girish Karnad as Forest Officer Sundar Rajan (Sandhya's Dad, Special appearance)
- Rahul Singh
- Mamta Kulkarni as Sandhya
- Benaf Dadachandji as Lali
- Harish Patel as Local Villager
- Shreechand Makhija as Local Villager
- Urmila Matondkar in a special appearance in the song "Chamma Chamma"

== Production ==
The film was conceived as a tribute to Akira Kurosawa's Seven Samurai. The film was made on the budget of ₹20 crores, the most expensive Bollywood production at that point of time.

== Soundtrack ==
China Gate

Soundtrack album by Anu Malik
- Released: October 1998
- Genre: Feature film soundtrack
- Label: Tips Industries

Anu Malik chronology
Soldier (1998)	China Gate (1998)	Wajood (1998)

The music for this movie was composed by Anu Malik and the item song "Chamma Chamma" became extremely popular, which was later used in Hollywood film Moulin Rouge! and was recreated for the film, Fraud Saiyyan.

All lyrics are written by Sameer.

No.	Title	Singer(s)	Length
1.	"Hum Ko To Rahna Hai"	Sonu Nigam, Hariharan, Vinod Rathod	7:11
2.	"Chamma Chamma"	Anu Malik, Sapna Awasthi	5:53
3.	"Chamma Chamma, Pt. 2"	Vinod Rathod, Shankar Mahadevan, Alka Yagnik	5:54
4.	"Is Mitti Ka Karz Tha Mujhpe"	Sonu Nigam	3:14
5.	"Theme of China Gate" (Instrumental)		1:02

== Reception ==
Nandita Chowdhury of India Today called it "one of the finest action movies to come out of Bollywood in the '90s." She further wrote, "The film for the most part is Sholay revisited. China Gate definitely has its magical moments and is worth watching."

Conversely, Suparn Verma of Rediff.com wrote, "Watching China-Gate isn't fun. On the contrary, it's an effort, as much as it was for the middle-aged characters in the film.

== See also ==
- Remakes of films by Akira Kurosawa
