= Ewan McGregor =

Scottish actor (born 1971)

Ewan McGregor OBE
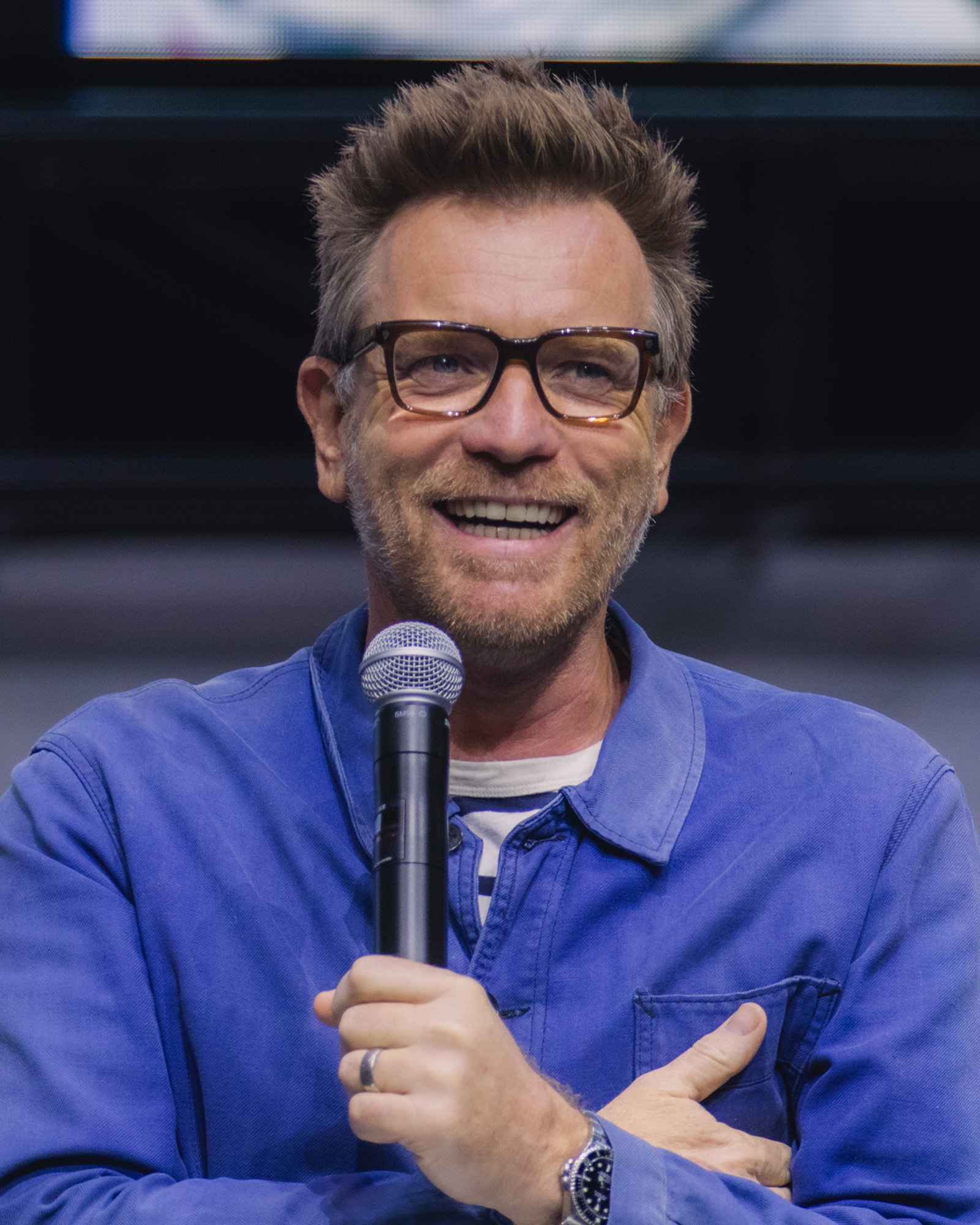
- McGregor at the 2024 Los Angeles Comic Con
- Born: Ewan Gordon McGregor; 31 March 1971 (age 55); Perth, Scotland
- Citizenship: United Kingdom; United States
- Education: Guildhall School of Music and Drama
- Occupations: Actor; film director; film producer; screenwriter
- Years active: 1992–present
- Works: Full list
- Spouses: Eve Mavrakis (m. 1995; div. 2020); Mary Elizabeth Winstead (m. 2022)
- Children: 5, including Clara and Esther
- Relatives: Denis Lawson (uncle)
- Awards: Full list

Ewan Gordon McGregor (/ˈjuːən/ YOO-ən; born 31 March 1971) is a Scottish actor and filmmaker. His accolades include a Golden Globe Award and a Primetime Emmy Award. In 2013, he was appointed Officer of the Order of the British Empire (OBE) for his service to drama and charity.

While studying drama at the Guildhall School of Music and Drama, McGregor began his career with a leading role in the British series Lipstick on Your Collar (1993). He gained international recognition for starring as drug addict Mark Renton in Trainspotting (1996), and as Obi-Wan Kenobi in the Star Wars prequel trilogy (1999–2005). His career progressed with starring roles in the musical Moulin Rouge! (2001) for which he was nominated for the AACTA Award for Best Actor in a Leading Role, action film Black Hawk Down (2001), fantasy film Big Fish (2003), and thriller Angels and Demons (2009). He was praised for his performances in the thriller The Ghost Writer (2010) and the romantic comedy Salmon Fishing in the Yemen (2011).

McGregor made his directorial debut with the crime film American Pastoral (2016), in which he also starred. For his dual role as brothers Ray and Emmit Stussy in the third season of the anthology series Fargo (2017), he won the Golden Globe Award for Best Actor – Miniseries or Television Film. He portrayed and voiced Lumière in Beauty and the Beast (2017), and played the title role in Christopher Robin (2018), Dan Torrance in Doctor Sleep (2019), and Black Mask in Birds of Prey (2020). He reprised his role as Kenobi in the 2022 miniseries Obi-Wan Kenobi, and won a Primetime Emmy Award for Outstanding Lead Actor for his portrayal of fashion designer Halston in the miniseries Halston (2021).

McGregor also appeared in the motorcycle-travel documentary series Long Way Round, Long Way Down, Long Way Up, and Long Way Home alongside Charley Boorman. He starred in theatre productions of Guys and Dolls (2005–2007) and Othello (2007–2008). McGregor has been involved in charity work and has served as an ambassador for UNICEF UK since 2004.

== Early life ==
Ewan Gordon McGregor was born on 31 March 1971 in Perth, Scotland, and was raised in nearby Crieff. His mother, Carol Diane (née Lawson), is a retired teacher at Crieff High School and latterly deputy head teacher at Kingspark School in Dundee. His father, James Charles Stewart "Jim" McGregor, is a retired physical education teacher and careers master at the independent Morrison's Academy in Crieff. He has an older brother, Colin (born 1969), a former Tornado GR4 pilot in the Royal Air Force. The two are nephews of actor Denis Lawson.

For his education, McGregor attended Morrison's Academy. After leaving school at the age of 16, he worked as a stagehand at Perth Theatre and studied a foundation course in drama at Kirkcaldy College of Technology, before moving to London to study drama at the Guildhall School of Music and Drama when he was 18 years old.

== Career ==
=== Film and television ===
Six months prior to his graduation from Guildhall, McGregor began a leading role in Dennis Potter's six-part Channel 4 series Lipstick on Your Collar (1993). He then starred in the BBC adaptation of Scarlet and Black (also 1993) with Rachel Weisz and made his film debut in Bill Forsyth's Being Human (1994). For his role in the thriller Shallow Grave (also 1994), he won an Empire Award. The film was his first collaboration with director Danny Boyle. He had a major role in the 1996 Channel 4 comedy-drama film Brassed Off, written and directed by Mark Herman. His international breakthrough followed with the role of heroin addict Mark Renton in Boyle's Trainspotting (1996), an adaptation of Irvine Welsh's novel of the same name.

In 1998, McGregor played the male romantic lead role in the British film Little Voice, and rockstar Curt Wild in the film Velvet Goldmine directed by Todd Haynes. He was cast as the young Obi-Wan Kenobi in the Star Wars prequel trilogy, released between 1999 and 2005. Kenobi was originally played by Alec Guinness in the first Star Wars trilogy. McGregor's uncle, Denis Lawson, had played Wedge Antilles in the original trilogy. While the prequels received mixed reviews, McGregor's performance was well received. McGregor said making the prequels was difficult, as he had to act mostly against green screens and the dialogue was "not exactly Shakespeare". He also stated that the negative reaction to the films had been difficult.

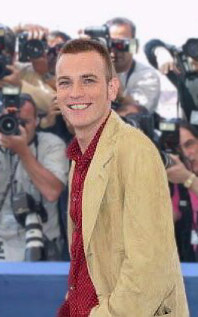
McGregor at the Cannes Film Festival in 2001

McGregor starred in Moulin Rouge! (2001) as the young poet Christian, who falls in love with the terminally-ill courtesan Satine (Nicole Kidman), for which his performance was widely praised and garnered McGregor his first Golden Globe Award for Best Actor – Motion Picture Musical or Comedy nomination. He also appeared in Ridley Scott's war film Black Hawk Down (2001) as John Grimes. He starred alongside Renée Zellweger in Down with Love (2003). He also portrayed the younger Edward Bloom in Tim Burton's critically acclaimed film Big Fish (2003) alongside Albert Finney, Jessica Lange, Alison Lohman and Billy Crudup. In the same period, he also received critical acclaim for his portrayal of an amoral drifter mixed up with murder in the drama Young Adam (also 2003), which co-starred Tilda Swinton.

McGregor voiced the robot Rodney Copperbottom in Robots and the lead character in Gary Chapman's Valiant (both 2005). Also around this time, McGregor played two roles – one a clone of the other – opposite Scarlett Johansson in Michael Bay's science fiction action thriller film The Island (2005). He also headlined Marc Forster's 2005 film Stay, a psychological thriller co-starring Naomi Watts and Ryan Gosling.

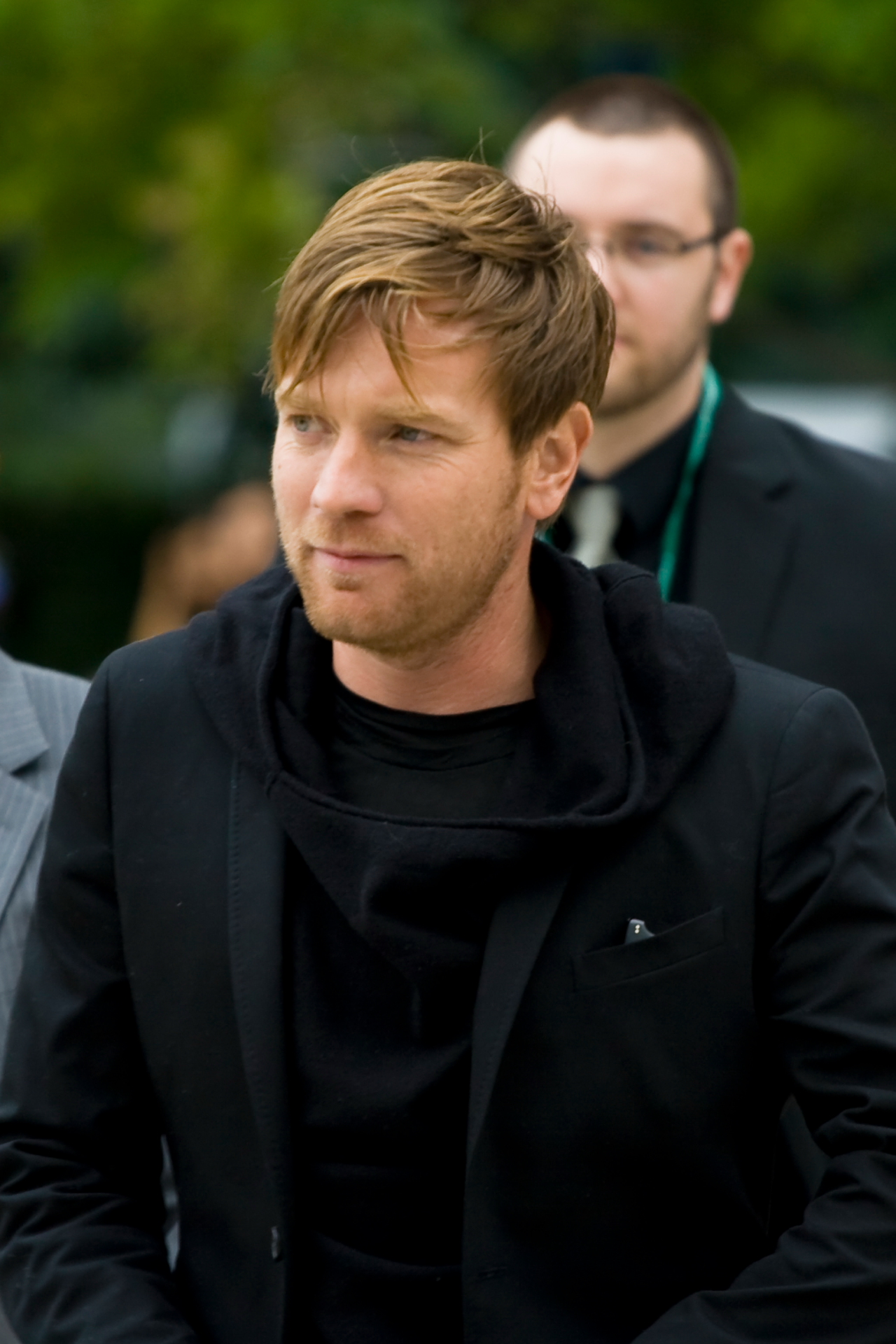
McGregor at the premiere of The Men Who Stare at Goats at the Toronto International Film Festival in 2009

He narrated the Fulldome production Astronaut (2006), created for the National Space Centre. Around the same time, he also narrated the STV show JetSet (also 2006), a six-part series following the lives of trainee pilots and navigators at RAF Lossiemouth as they undergo a gruelling six-month course learning to fly the Tornado GR4, the RAF's primary attack aircraft. McGregor starred opposite Colin Farrell in the Woody Allen film Cassandra's Dream (2007), and he co-starred with Jim Carrey in I Love You Phillip Morris and appeared in Amelia (both 2009) alongside Hilary Swank. He played "the ghost" – the unnamed main character – in Roman Polanski's political thriller The Ghost Writer (2010). He portrayed Camerlengo Patrick McKenna in Ron Howard's mystery thriller Angels & Demons (also 2009), the film adaptation of Dan Brown's novel of the same name and a sequel to Howard's The Da Vinci Code, co-starring Tom Hanks as Robert Langdon. In 2011, McGregor starred in the British comedy Salmon Fishing in the Yemen directed by Lasse Hallström and co-starring Emily Blunt and Kristin Scott Thomas, for which he received his second Golden Globe Award for Best Actor – Motion Picture Musical or Comedy nomination. That same year, he was awarded with the SIFF Golden Space Needle Award for Outstanding Achievement in Acting at the 2011 Seattle International Film Festival.

In 2012, he was a member of the Jury for the Main Competition at the 2012 Cannes Film Festival. At the San Sebastián International Film Festival, he was awarded the Donostia Lifetime Achievement Award and became the youngest recipient of the award. The same year, he also starred in the disaster drama film The Impossible opposite Naomi Watts and Tom Holland. In 2013, McGregor starred alongside Meryl Streep and Julia Roberts in August: Osage County, which was based on Tracy Letts's Pulitzer Prize-winning play of the same name.

McGregor starred in the action comedy film Mortdecai (2015), alongside Johnny Depp and Paul Bettany. Robbie Collin of The Daily Telegraph felt the film was "psychotically unfunny". He made his directorial debut with American Pastoral (2016), in which he also starred.

In 2017, he reprised his role as Mark Renton in T2 Trainspotting. McGregor played and voiced Lumière (originally voiced by Jerry Orbach in the 1991 animated film) in the live-action adaptation of Disney's Beauty and the Beast, directed by Bill Condon, with an ensemble cast featuring Emma Watson and Dan Stevens in leading roles, alongside Luke Evans, Kevin Kline, Josh Gad, Stanley Tucci, Ian McKellen, and Emma Thompson. Filming began in May 2015 at Shepperton Studios in London, and the movie was released in March 2017. He then starred in FX anthology series in the third season of Fargo (both 2017), which garnered him a Golden Globe Award for Best Actor – Miniseries or Television Film for his dual performance of Emmit Stussy and Ray Stussy at the 75th Golden Globe Awards. In 2018, McGregor starred as the adult version of the titular character in Christopher Robin, a live-action adaptation of Disney's Winnie the Pooh franchise directed by Marc Forster and starred alongside Hayley Atwell.

In 2019, McGregor starred as the older Danny Torrance in Doctor Sleep, the film adaptation of Stephen King's novel of the same name. In 2020, he appeared opposite Margot Robbie in Warner Bros.' DC Comics film Birds of Prey (and the Fantabulous Emancipation of One Harley Quinn), directed by Cathy Yan, as the main villain Roman Sionis / Black Mask.

On 23 August 2019, Lucasfilm announced that McGregor would reprise his role as Obi-Wan Kenobi in a new Star Wars television series, which was released on Disney+ in 2022.

In 2021, McGregor played the American fashion designer Halston in the eponymously titled miniseries for Netflix, based on the candid biography Simply Halston by journalist Steven Gaines. McGregor was also billed as executive producer, jointly with Ryan Murphy.

In 2022, McGregor voiced Sebastián J. Cricket, the conscience and narrator, in Pinocchio. The film was directed by Guillermo del Toro and premiered on Netflix.

In September 2024, McGregor received his star on the Hollywood Walk of Fame. In 2026, he had a starring role as Greg Platt in the science fiction survival film The End of Oak Street.

=== Theatre ===
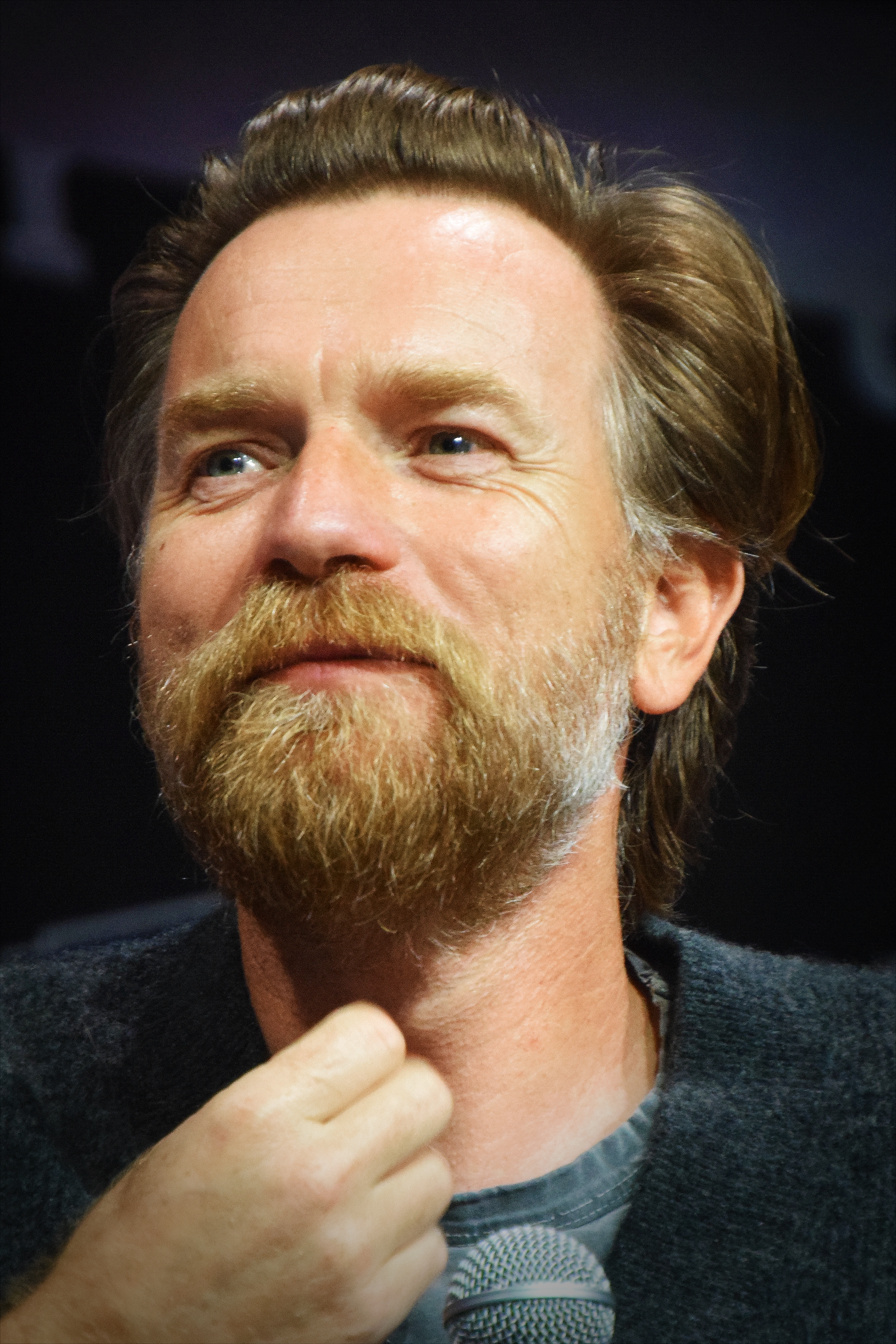
McGregor in 2023

From November 1998 to March 1999, McGregor starred as Malcolm Scrawdyke in a revival of David Halliwell's Little Malcolm and His Struggles Against the Eunuchs, directed by his uncle, Denis Lawson. The production was first staged at the Hampstead Theatre before transferring to the Comedy Theatre in London's West End. In November 2001, McGregor made a cameo appearance in The Play What I Wrote.

From June 2005 to April 2007, McGregor starred alongside Jane Krakowski, Douglas Hodge and Jenna Russell in the Donmar Warehouse revival of Guys and Dolls after it transferred to the Piccadilly Theatre in London. He played the leading role of Sky Masterson. McGregor received the LastMinute.com award for Best Actor for his performance in 2005, and he was nominated for a Laurence Olivier Award for Best Actor in a Musical in 2007.

From December 2007 to February 2008, McGregor starred as Iago in Othello at the Donmar Warehouse alongside Chiwetel Ejiofor as Othello and Kelly Reilly as Desdemona. He reprised the role on BBC Radio 3 in May 2008.

McGregor made his Broadway debut in a 2014 production of Tom Stoppard's The Real Thing at the American Airlines Theatre. He was cast in the role of Henry and starred alongside Maggie Gyllenhaal and Cynthia Nixon.

McGregor returned to the West End in April 2025, to act in My Master Builder, a new play based on Henrik Ibsen's "The Master Builder". In 2027, he is expected to star in the 2027 play Supernova at Pitlochry Festival Theatre.

== Motorcycling ==
A motorcyclist since his youth, in 2004 McGregor undertook an international motorcycling trip with his best friend Charley Boorman, accompanied by cameraman Claudio von Planta and a support crew. From mid-April to the end of July, they travelled from London to New York City via central Europe, Ukraine, Kazakhstan, Mongolia, Russia, Canada, and the United States on BMW R1150GS motorcycles, over a cumulative distance of 22,345 miles (35,960 km). The trip included visits to several UNICEF programmes along the route, and formed the basis of a television series and a best-selling book, both called Long Way Round.

McGregor and Boorman reunited with this team in 2007 for another international motorcycle trip, from John o' Groats in Scotland to Cape Town in South Africa. The journey lasted from May until August, and yielded another book and TV series, titled Long Way Down.

McGregor appeared in a two-part BBC documentary in 2012 entitled Ewan McGregor: Cold Chain Mission in which he travels by motorbike, boat, plane, and foot to deliver vaccines to children in remote parts of India, Nepal and the Republic of Congo. The trip was part of his work as a UNICEF Ambassador.

In 2019, McGregor and Boorman – with their principal support crew from the previous two Long Way journeys – undertook a third international trip, this time on Harley-Davidson LiveWire electric motorcycles. From September to December, they rode from Patagonia, Argentina to California, United States, which was documented in the 2020 series Long Way Up.

In 2024, McGregor and Boorman – with their principal support crew from the previous Long Way journeys – undertook a fourth international trip, this time on a 1974 Moto Guzzi Eldorado police motorcycle, while Boorman chose a BMW R75/5. This was documented in the 2025 series Long Way Home.

== Philanthropy ==
McGregor is involved in charity work, including UNICEF UK since 2004 and GO Campaign. During the Long Way Round journey in 2004, McGregor and his travelling companions saw some of UNICEF's work in Ukraine, Kazakhstan, and Mongolia, and during the Long Way Down trip in 2007, he and Charley Boorman did some work for UNICEF in Africa. McGregor hosted the annual Hollywood gala for the GO Campaign in 2009 and 2010. He has worked with the Children's Hospice Association Scotland, as featured in Long Way Down. In 2012, he travelled with UNICEF immunisation workers to remote parts of India, Nepal and the Republic of Congo for a BBC2 documentary entitled Ewan McGregor: Cold Chain Mission.

In June 2015, McGregor read Hans Christian Andersen's "The Little Match Girl" for the children's fairy tales app GivingTales in aid of UNICEF, together with other prominent figures such as Sir Roger Moore, Stephen Fry, Dame Joan Collins, Joanna Lumley, and Sir Michael Caine.

== Personal life ==
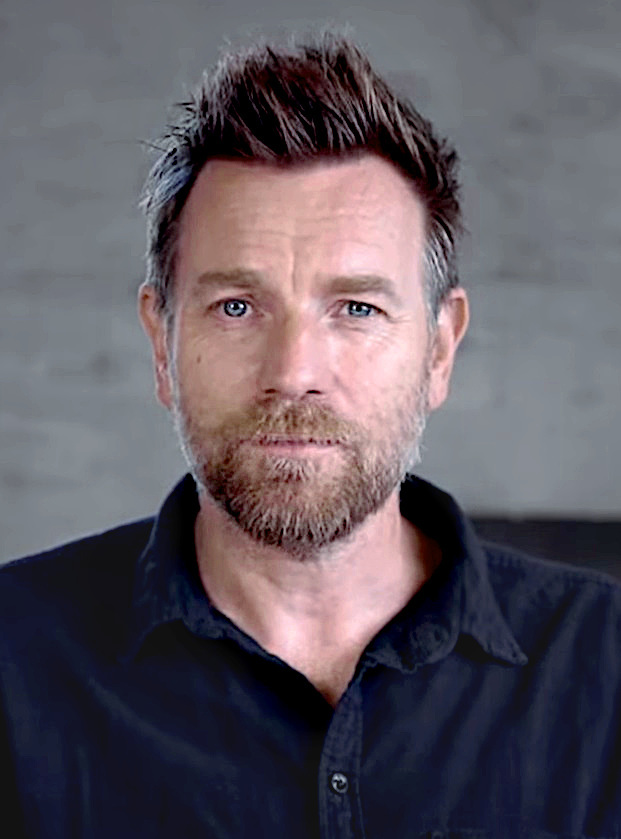
McGregor in 2022

McGregor divides his time between Los Angeles, California, and St John's Wood, London. McGregor enjoys travelling and is a fan of Manchester City F.C.

In 2007, on an episode of Parkinson, McGregor said he had been a teetotaller for the last seven years. He also mentioned this in an interview with the Irish Independent in 2008, stating that he would often turn up to sets drunk or hung over in the late 1990s, and that he decided to stop altogether to avoid spiralling down further.

In 2008, McGregor had a cancerous mole removed from below his right eye.

In September 2020, after travelling through Chile for the documentary Long Way Up, he revealed that one of his great-grandfathers, John "Juan" Charles McIndoe, was born in Chile to Scottish parents while his father worked with the American engineers in the construction of the railways at the end of the 19th century. Later, John went to Glasgow and worked as a wine importer and diplomat.

McGregor became a naturalised US citizen after 2016 so he would be able to vote in the 2020 US presidential election. During his journey on Long Way Up, he travelled entirely on his US passport.

He is a fan of the Fremantle Dockers in the Australian Football League.

In 2025, McGregor rejoined his youth pipe band the Morrison's Academy; he invited the band to his estate in Carse of Gowrie, where he alongside the band played a special show for his parents.

=== Family and relationships ===
McGregor married Eve Mavrakis, a French-Greek Jewish production designer whom he met on the set of Kavanagh QC, in 1995. Together they have four daughters: actresses Clara and Esther as well as two adopted girls, one of whom, Jamyan McGregor, was an orphaned child from Mongolia. He met her while travelling in April 2004 for the filming of Long Way Round.

With his children raised in Mavrakis's Jewish faith, McGregor said in 2016, "My involvement in religion has more to do with the Jewish faith now and not the Christian faith, which I was very vaguely brought up in." McGregor has a heart and dagger tattoo of the names of Mavrakis and their daughters on his right arm. McGregor has appeared alongside his daughter Clara in Christopher Robin, The Birthday Cake and Bleeding Love.

On 19 January 2018, having been separated since May 2017, McGregor filed for divorce from Mavrakis, citing irreconcilable differences; the divorce was finalised on 13 August 2020. McGregor admitted that his daughter Clara was "very hurt and angry" at his separation from Mavrakis. He credited working with Clara on the semi-biographical film Bleeding Love (2023) as helping to rebuild their relationship.

In May 2017, McGregor began a relationship with American actress Mary Elizabeth Winstead, whom he met on the set of Fargo. Their son was born in June 2021. McGregor and Winstead married in April 2022.

== Political views ==
McGregor was an outspoken critic of Brexit. Although opposed to Scottish independence from the United Kingdom in the 2014 Scottish referendum, McGregor later declared during an interview that he would have voted for independence if he had been able to cast his vote the day after the United Kingdom left the European Union. In 2020, he voiced his support for Scottish independence, saying that "it's time".

McGregor is a feminist. In 2009, he said, "Women are always expected to be naked in films, but I like to try and do it so they are not naked—have the women not be naked. It's a feminist thing that I do." In 2017, he refused to appear on Piers Morgan's show after Morgan made disparaging remarks about the participants of the 2017 Women's March.

In October 2023, McGregor signed open letters related to the Gaza war, including one calling on President Joe Biden to secure the release of hostages taken by Hamas and one by Artists4Ceasefire that called for a ceasefire in the war.

== In popular culture ==
McGregor was ranked number 36 on Empire magazine's "The Top 100 Movie Stars of All Time" list in 1997. In a 2004 poll for the BBC, he was named the fourth-most influential person in British culture. IndieWire named McGregor one of the best actors never to have received an Academy Award nomination.

== Awards and nominations ==
In 2010, McGregor was appointed by the French government as a Chevalier de l'Ordre des Arts et Lettres (Knight of the Order of the Arts and Letters). McGregor was appointed an Officer of the Order of the British Empire (OBE) in the 2013 New Year Honours for services to drama and charity.

== Bibliography ==
- Long Way Round, 2004 (with Charley Boorman), ISBN 0-7434-9933-6
- Long Way Down, 2008 (with Charley Boorman), ISBN 1-4165-7745-9

== Discography ==
=== Singles ===
Title	Year	Chart positions							Certification	Album
Title	Year	UK	AUS	BEL	GER	NLD	SWE	SWI	Certification	Album
"Choose Life" (PF Project featuring Ewan McGregor)	1997	6	40	22	—	99	40	—		Trainspotting#2: Music from the Motion Picture, Vol.#2
"Come What May" (with Nicole Kidman)	2001	27	10	—	95	65	—	97	ARIA: Gold; BPI: Silver	Moulin Rouge! Music from Baz Luhrmann's Film

=== Other appearances ===
- "TV Eye" with Wylde Ratttz, Velvet Goldmine: Music from the Original Motion Picture, 1999.
- "Elephant Love Medley" with Nicole Kidman, Moulin Rouge! Music from Baz Luhrmann's Film, 2001.
- "El Tango de Roxanne" with Jose Feliciano, Moulin Rouge! Music from Baz Luhrmann's Film, 2001.
- "Your Song" with Alessandro Safina, Moulin Rouge! Music from Baz Luhrmann's Film, 2001.
- "Here's To Love" with Renée Zellweger, Down With Love: Music from and Included in the Motion Picture, 2003.
- "The Sweetest Gift", Unexpected Dreams – Songs From the Stars, 2006.
- "Be Our Guest" with Emma Thompson, Ian McKellen, and Gugu Mbatha-Raw, Beauty and the Beast, 2017.
- "Days in the Sun" with Adam Mitchell, Stanley Tucci, Ian McKellen, Emma Thompson, Emma Watson, Audra McDonald, Clive Rowe, Beauty and the Beast, 2017.
- "Something There" with Emma Watson, Dan Stevens, Ian McKellen, Emma Thompson, Nathan Mack, Gugu Mbatha-Raw, Beauty and the Beast, 2017.
- "The Mob Song", with Luke Evans, Josh Gad, Emma Thompson, Ian McKellen, Stanley Tucci, Nathan Mack, & Gugu Mbatha-Raw, Beauty and the Beast, 2017.
- "Better Tomorrows", Pinocchio, 2022.

== Audiobooks ==
- 2006: Beatrix Potter: Favourite Beatrix Potter Tales (among others with Emily Watson and Renée Zellweger), Warne publishing (Read by Stars of the Movie Miss Potter)
