= Come What May (2001 song) =

Single by Nicole Kidman and Ewan McGregor

from the album Moulin Rouge!
- Released: 24 September 2001
- Recorded: March 2001
- Genre: Pop, musical
- Length: 4:48
- Label: Interscope
- Songwriters: David Baerwald, Kevin Gilbert
- Producers: BLAM, Marius de Vries, Josh G Abrahams

Nicole Kidman singles chronology
"Come What May" (2001)	"Somethin' Stupid" (2001)

Music video
- "Come What May" on YouTube

"Come What May" is a song written by David Baerwald and Kevin Gilbert, originally intended for the film William Shakespeare's Romeo + Juliet. However, it debuted in, and is best known as the romantic love theme from, Baz Luhrmann's 2001 film Moulin Rouge!, in which Ewan McGregor and Nicole Kidman sing it in their respective roles as Christian and Satine.

The song takes its title from a phrase that originates from Shakespeare's Twelfth Night (1601) and later appeared in Macbeth (1606).

The song plays an important role in the film. After Christian and Satine's forbidden, strong, and close romantic relationship has been discovered, Christian pens this song and includes it in the musical he is currently writing. Each time either of them sings this song, they can secretly declare their equally deep and true romantic love for each other.

The version of the song on the soundtrack album differs slightly from the version in the film. The lyrics "Every day I love you more and more" and "Listen to my heart, can you hear it sing/Telling me to give you everything" are part of the song on the soundtrack version. However, in the movie, they are replaced by a musical interlude the first time and, the second time, Satine sings instead of the latter part, "Come back to me and forgive everything." The single version can be found on the original soundtrack, while the original film version can be found on the follow-up soundtrack.

It was released as a single in Australia where it became the eighth highest-selling single by an Australian artist of 2001. It was also released in Germany, and the UK, where it charted at #27.

== Awards ==
"Come What May" was nominated for a 2002 Golden Globe Award for Best Original Song – Motion Picture, but lost to Sting's "Until" from Kate & Leopold. The song was ineligible for a nomination for the Academy Award for Best Song because it was originally written with another film in mind: Luhrmann's previous project, William Shakespeare's Romeo + Juliet. The song was ranked on the AFI's 100 Years...100 Songs at number 85.

== Track listing ==
UK CD Single

1. "Come What May (Josh G. Abrahams Radio Remix)" – 4:01
2. "Come What May (David Foster Album Version)" – 4:48
3. "Come What May (Josh G. Abrahams Extended Mix)" – 4:41
4. "Come What May (Film Version)" – 4:38
5. "Elephant Love Medley (Karaoke Version)" – 4:13

== Charts ==
Chart (2001)	Peak position
Australia (ARIA Charts)	10
Germany (Media Control Charts)	95
Netherlands (Single Top 100)	65
Switzerland (Swiss Hitparade)	97
UK (Official Charts Company)	27

== Certifications ==
Region	Certification	Certified units/sales
Australia (ARIA)	Gold	35,000^{^}
United Kingdom (BPI)	Silver	200,000^{‡}
^{^} Shipments figures based on certification alone.^{‡} Sales+streaming figures based on certification alone.

== Other versions ==
- Welsh soprano Katherine Jenkins and Spanish tenor Plácido Domingo recorded the song (also released as a single) for Jenkins' 2011 album This Is Christmas and Domingo's 2012 album Songs. They performed it together at the 2012 Royal Variety Performance and on the American television program, Dancing with the Stars, on 2 October of that year.
- Peter Jöback and Helen Sjöholm performed the song for the Swedish Crown Princess Victoria and her husband Prince Daniel at a celebratory concert the night before their 2010 wedding.
- Il Divo recorded a Spanish version of the song titled "Come What May (Te Amaré)" in their 2011 album Wicked Game.
- In 2013, the song was sung in the musical TV series Glee by Chris Colfer and Darren Criss (as their respective characters Kurt Hummel and Blaine Anderson), in the 15th episode of the 4th season, titled "Girls (and Boys) On Film".
- Nick D'Virgilio, a friend and collaborator of co-writer Kevin Gilbert, recorded a version of the song on his 2001 album, Karma.
- Musical theatre performers Alfie Boe and Kerry Ellis duet on a version of this song on Boe's album Bring Him Home. Ellis also performed the song with John Barrowman and Jonathan Ansell on two occasions at BBC Radio 2's Friday Night Is Music Night.
- Luke Evans featuring Charlotte Church released a version as a single on 14 October 2022, taken from Evans' second studio album, A Song for You.
- The song is featured in the original recording of the 2018 jukebox musical Moulin Rouge!, performed by stage actors Aaron Tveit and Karen Olivo, who played Christian and Satine, respectively, in the Broadway production.
- The song is performed as a duet by Siôn Daniel Young and Fra Fee in Duck Soup Films' limited series Lost Boys and Fairies, episode 2, entitled "With or Without You."
