= Chamma Chamma =

Hindi Song

Song by Alka Yagnik, Shankar Mahadevan, Sapna Awasthi & Vinod Rathod
- Language: Hindi
- Genre: Filmi, Pop-folk, Indian folk music
- Length: 5:46
- Label: Tips Official
- Composer: Anu Malik
- Lyricist: Sameer
- Producer: Rajkumar Santoshi

"Chamma Chamma" is a Hindi song from the 1998 Indian film China Gate sung by Alka Yagnik and was picturised on Urmila Matondkar which became extremely popular.

== Song ==
It is a classical celebration song or Folk dance song with Filmi Lyrics.

== Reception ==
The song became extremely popular in Indian subcontinent as well as globally.

== In popular culture ==
It was used in the film Moulin Rouge!. It was incorporated in the film as "Hindi Sad Diamonds".

== Remix ==
It was remastered for the film, Fraud Saiyyan which featured Elli AvrRam and sung by Neha Kakkar and Ikka.
