= Moulin Rouge! =

2001 film by Baz Luhrmann

- Theatrical release poster
- Directed by: Baz Luhrmann
- Written by: Baz Luhrmann; Craig Pearce
- Produced by: Martin Brown; Baz Luhrmann; Fred Baron
- Starring: Nicole Kidman; Ewan McGregor; John Leguizamo; Jim Broadbent; Richard Roxburgh
- Cinematography: Donald M. McAlpine
- Edited by: Jill Bilcock
- Music by: Craig Armstrong
- Production company: Bazmark Productions
- Distributed by: 20th Century Fox
- Release dates: 9 May 2001 (Cannes); 25 May 2001 (Australia); 1 June 2001 (United States)
- Running time: 128 minutes
- Countries: Australia; United States
- Language: English
- Budget: $50 million
- Box office: $179 million

Moulin Rouge! (/ˌmuːlæ̃ ˈruːʒ/, French: [mulɛ̃ ʁuʒ]) is a 2001 jukebox musical romantic drama film directed, produced and co-written by Baz Luhrmann. It follows a British poet, Christian, who falls in love with the star of the Moulin Rouge, cabaret actress and courtesan Satine.

The film uses the musical setting of the Montmartre Quarter of Paris and is the final part of Luhrmann's Red Curtain Trilogy, following Strictly Ballroom (1992) and Romeo + Juliet (1996). A co-production of Australia and the United States, it features an ensemble cast starring Nicole Kidman and Ewan McGregor, with Jim Broadbent, Richard Roxburgh, John Leguizamo, Jacek Koman and Caroline O'Connor in supporting roles.

Moulin Rouge! premiered at the 2001 Cannes Film Festival, where it competed for the Palme d'Or and was released in theaters by 20th Century Fox on 25 May 2001 in Australia and on 1 June 2001 in North America. The film was praised for Luhrmann's direction, the performances of the cast, its soundtrack, costume design, and production values. It was also a commercial success, grossing $179 million on a $50 million budget. At the 74th Academy Awards, the film received eight nominations, including Best Picture, and won two (Best Production Design and Best Costume Design). Later critical reception for Moulin Rouge! remained positive and has been considered by many to be one of the best films of all time, with it ranking 53rd in the BBC's 2016 poll of the 100 greatest films of the 21st century. A stage musical adaptation premiered in 2018.

== Plot ==
In 1900 in Paris, Christian, a writer grieving the death of the woman he loved, begins writing their story.

A year earlier in 1899, he arrives in the Montmartre district of Paris to join the Bohemian movement. He meets Henri de Toulouse-Lautrec and his troupe of performers who are writing a play called Spectacular Spectacular. After Christian helps them complete the play, they go to the Moulin Rouge where they hope Christian's talents will impress Satine, the star performer and courtesan, who will in turn convince Harold Zidler, the proprietor of the Moulin Rouge, to let Christian write the show. However, Zidler plans to have the wealthy, powerful and unscrupulous Duke of Monroth sleep with Satine in exchange for potential financing to convert the club into a theater.

Satine mistakes Christian for the Duke and attempts to seduce him by dancing with him before retiring to her chamber with him to discuss matters privately, but Christian reveals his true identity. After the Duke interrupts them, Satine claims that the two of them and the Bohemians were rehearsing Spectacular Spectacular. Aided by Zidler, Christian and the Bohemians improvise a story for the Duke about a beautiful Indian courtesan who falls in love with a poor sitar player she mistook for a wealthy but evil maharaja. Approving the story, the Duke agrees to invest, but only if Satine and the Moulin Rouge are turned over to him. Later, Satine claims not to be in love with Christian, but he wears down her resolve and they kiss.

During construction at the Moulin Rouge, Christian and Satine's love deepens while the Duke becomes frustrated by all the time he thinks Satine is spending with Christian working on the play. To calm him, Zidler arranges for Satine to spend the night with the Duke and tells her to end her affair with Christian. She misses the dinner when she falls unconscious, leading a doctor to diagnose a fatal case of consumption. She tries to tell Christian that their relationship is endangering the production, but Christian writes a secret song to include in the show that affirms their love.

At the final rehearsal, can-can dancer Nini hints to the Duke that the play represents the relationship between him, Christian, and Satine. Enraged, the Duke demands that the show end with the courtesan marrying the maharaja. Satine promises to spend the night with him after which they will decide on the ending. Ultimately, she fails to seduce the Duke due to her feelings for Christian, and Le Chocolat, one of the cabaret dancers, saves her from the Duke's attempt to rape her. Christian decides that he and Satine should leave the show behind and run away to be together while the Duke vows to kill Christian.

Zidler finds Satine in her dressing room packing. He tells her that her illness is fatal, that the Duke is planning to murder Christian, and that if she wants Christian to live, she must cut him off and be with the Duke. She complies, leaving Christian devastated.

On the opening night of the show, Christian denounces Satine and vows to give her to the Duke before walking off the stage, but Toulouse-Lautrec cries out from the rafters, "The greatest thing you'll ever learn is just to love and be loved in return." This spurs Satine to sing their secret song, causing Christian to change his mind. After Zidler and the company thwart several attempts by the Duke and his bodyguard to kill Christian, the show ends with Christian and Satine proclaiming their love as the Duke storms out of the cabaret. The audience erupts in applause, but Satine collapses after the curtains close. Before dying in Christian's arms, she tells him to write their story so she will always be with him.

Six months later, the Moulin Rouge has closed down and is in disrepair. Christian overcomes his grief by finishing his and Satine's story, declaring their love will live forever.

== Cast ==
- Nicole Kidman as Satine
- Ewan McGregor as Christian
- Jim Broadbent as Harold Zidler
- Richard Roxburgh as The Duke of Monroth
- John Leguizamo as Henri de Toulouse-Lautrec
- Jacek Koman as The Unconscious Argentinean (Note: Though this character does not spend his entire time on screen unconscious and instead displays symptoms that are more closely associated with narcolepsy, the film and its credits refer to this character as The Unconscious Argentinean.)
- Caroline O'Connor as Nini Legs-In-the-Air
- Kerry Walker as Marie
- Lara Mulcahy as Môme Fromage
- Garry McDonald as The Doctor
- Matthew Whittet as Satie
- David Wenham as Audrey
- Kiruna Stamell as La Petite Princesse
- DeObia Oparei as Le Chocolat
- Kylie Minogue as The Green Fairy
  - Ozzy Osbourne additionally provided the character's voice
- Peter Whitford as The Stage Manager
- Linal Haft as Warner
- Norman Kaye as Satine's doctor
- Arthur Dignam as Christian's father
- Carole Skinner as The Landlady
- Jonathan Hardy as The Man in the Moon
  - Plácido Domingo additionally provided the character's voice
- Keith Robinson as Le Pétomane
- Tara Morice as The Prostitute
- Sue-Ellen Shook as Baby Doll
- Kip Gamblin as Latin Dancer

== Production ==
=== Writing and inspiration ===
Moulin Rouge! was influenced by an eclectic variety of comic and melodramatic musical sources, including the Hollywood musical, "vaudeville, cabaret culture, stage musicals, and operas." Its musical elements also allude to Luhrmann's earlier film Strictly Ballroom.

Giacomo Puccini's opera La bohème, which Luhrmann directed at the Sydney Opera House in 1993, was a key source of the plot for Moulin Rouge!. Further stylistic inspiration came from Luhrmann's encounter with Bollywood films during his visit to India while conducting research for his 1993 production of Benjamin Britten's opera A Midsummer Night's Dream. According to Luhrmann:

. . . we went to this huge, ice cream picture palace to see a Bollywood movie. Here we were, with 2,000 Indians watching a film in Hindi, and there was the lowest possible comedy and then incredible drama and tragedy and then break out in songs. And it was three-and-a-half hours! We thought we had suddenly learnt Hindi, because we understood everything! We thought it was incredible. How involved the audience were. How uncool they were – how their coolness had been ripped aside and how they were united in this singular sharing of the story. The thrill of thinking, 'Could we ever do that in the West? Could we ever get past that cerebral cool and perceived cool.' It required this idea of comic-tragedy. Could you make those switches? Fine in Shakespeare – low comedy and then you die in five minutes. . . . In Moulin Rouge!, we went further. Our recognisable story, though Orphean in shape, is derived from Camille, La Boheme – whether you know those texts or not, you recognise those patterns and character types.

In the DVD's audio commentary, Luhrmann revealed that he also drew from the Greek tragedy of Orpheus and Eurydice. The filmmakers projected the Orpheus figure onto Christian by characterizing the latter as a musical genius whose talent surpassed that of everyone else in his world. The film's use of songs from the mid- to late 20th century in the 1899 setting makes Christian appear ahead of his time as a musician and writer. Moulin Rouge!′s plot also parallels that of the myth: "McGregor, as a poet who spouts deathless verse . . . , descends into a hellish underworld of prostitution and musical entertainment in order to retrieve Kidman, the singing courtesan who loves him but is enslaved to a diabolical duke. He rescues her but looks back and . . . cue Queen's 'The Show Must Go On.'"

Commentators have also noted the similarities between the film's plot and those of the opera La Traviata and Émile Zola's novel Nana. Other cinematic elements appear to have been borrowed from the musical films Cabaret, Folies Bergère de Paris, and Meet Me in St. Louis.

The character of Satine was based on the French can-can dancer Jane Avril. The character of Harold Zidler shares his last name with Charles Zidler, one of the owners of the real Moulin Rouge. Satie was loosely based on the French composers Erik Satie and Maurice Ravel. Môme Fromage, Le Pétomane, and Le Chocolat share their names with performers at the actual cabaret. Marlene Dietrich, Greta Garbo and Rita Hayworth were cited as inspirations for the film's "look."

=== Development ===
Leonardo DiCaprio, who worked with Luhrmann on Romeo + Juliet, unsuccessfully auditioned for the role of Christian - even going so far as to sing. Ethan Hawke also read for the role. Luhrmann also considered younger actors for the role, including Heath Ledger and Jake Gyllenhaal, before Ewan McGregor won the part. On Heath Ledger's audition, Luhrmann went on to say in 2026: "Heath Ledger was actually really extraordinary and he and Nicole (Kidman) were extraordinary together. He was just a bit too young... it became another thing, you know? But the footage of Heath and Nicole is really beautiful and we often talk about that." Courtney Love auditioned for the role of Satine and gave approval for "Smells Like Teen Spirit" to be used in the film. Luhrmann had initially wanted John Leguizamo for the role of the Unconscious Argentinian, as he was seeking Rowan Atkinson for the role of Henri de Toulouse-Lautrec. Leguizamo convinced Luhrmann to let him audition for the latter role, and ultimately won it.

=== Filming ===
Production began on 9 November 1999 and was completed on 13 May 2000, with a budget of $50 million. It was shot on the sound stages at Fox Studios in Sydney. Filming generally went smoothly, but Kidman broke her ribs twice when she was lifted into the air during the dance sequences. She also suffered from a torn knee cartilage resulting from a fall during the "Diamonds Are a Girl's Best Friend" production song. Kidman later stated in an interview with Graham Norton that she broke a rib while getting into a corset by tightening it as much as possible to achieve an 18-inch waist, and that she fell down the stairs while dancing in heels. Kidman also experienced a recurring knee injury while filming, making her drop out of the lead role in Panic Room. The production overran its shooting schedule and had to be out of the sound stages to make way for Star Wars: Episode II – Attack of the Clones (which also starred McGregor). This necessitated the filming of some pick-up shots in Madrid.

In the liner notes to the film's Special Edition DVD, Luhrmann writes that "[the] whole stylistic premise has been to decode what the Moulin Rouge was to the audiences of 1899 and express that same thrill and excitement in a way to which contemporary movie-goers can relate." Both Roger Ebert and The New York Times compared the film's editing and cinematography to that of a music video and noted its visual homage to early Technicolor films.

=== Music ===
Marsha Kinder describes Moulin Rouge! as a "brilliant," "celebratory," and "humorous" musical and aural pastiche due to its use of diverse songs. Moulin Rouge! takes well-known popular music, mostly drawn from the MTV Generation, and juxtaposes it into a tale set in a turn-of-the-century Paris cabaret. Kinder holds that keeping borrowed lyrics and melodies intact "makes it almost impossible for spectators to miss the poaching [of songs] (even if they cannot name the particular source)."

The film uses so much popular music that it took Luhrmann two and a half years to secure the rights to all of the songs. Some of the songs sampled include "Chamma Chamma" from the Hindi movie China Gate, Queen's "The Show Must Go On" (arranged in operatic format), David Bowie's rendition of Nat King Cole's "Nature Boy", "Lady Marmalade" by Labelle (in the Christina Aguilera/P!nk/Mýa/Lil' Kim cover commissioned for the film), Madonna's "Material Girl" and "Like a Virgin", Elton John's "Your Song", the titular number of The Sound of Music, "Roxanne" by The Police (in a tango format using the composition "Tanguera" by Mariano Mores), and "Smells Like Teen Spirit" by Nirvana.

Luhrmann had intended to incorporate songs by The Rolling Stones and Cat Stevens into the film, but could not obtain the necessary rights from these artists. When Stevens denied consent for the use of "Father and Son" due to religious objections to the film's content, "Nature Boy" was chosen as its replacement.

== Release and reception ==
Originally set for release on Christmas 2000, 20th Century Fox eventually moved the release of Moulin Rouge! to Summer 2001 to allow Luhrmann more time in post-production. Moulin Rouge! premiered at the 2001 Cannes Film Festival on May 9, 2001, as the festival's opening title.

Moulin Rouge! opened in the United States at two theaters in New York and Los Angeles on May 18, 2001. It grossed US$167,540 on its opening weekend. The film then expanded to a national release on June 1, 2001. It generated $14.2 million, ranking in fourth place behind Pearl Harbor, Shrek and The Animal. In the United Kingdom, Moulin Rouge! earned $3.2 million during its opening weekend and beat Scary Movie 2 and A Knight's Tale to rank as the country's number one film. It would continue to so in its second weekend, making $2.7 million and outgrossing the opening of The Fast and the Furious. In its third weekend, it was displaced by A.I. Artificial Intelligence, although it collected $2.2 million. During its fifth weekend, it reclaimed the number one spot with $1.6 million. The film was eventually dethroned by American Pie 2 in its sixth weekend, but still managed to cross the $20 million mark. Moulin Rouge! has grossed $57,386,369 in the United States and Canada and another $121,813,167 internationally (including $26 million in the United Kingdom and $3,878,504 in Australia).

Moulin Rouge! received generally positive reviews from critics. Roger Ebert rated the film 3.5 stars out of 4, remarking that "the movie is all color and music, sound and motion, kinetic energy, broad strokes, operatic excess." Newsweek praised McGregor's and Kidman's performances, stating that "both stars hurl themselves into the movie's reckless spirit, unafraid of looking foolish, adroitly attuned to Luhrmann's abrupt swings from farce to tragedy. (And both sing well.)" The New York Times wrote that "the film is undeniably rousing, but there is not a single moment of organic excitement because Mr. Luhrmann is so busy splicing bits from other films" but conceded that "there's nothing else like it, and young audiences, especially girls, will feel as if they had found a movie that was calling them by name." All Things Considered commented the film was "not gonna be for all tastes" and that "you either surrender to this sort of flamboyance or you experience it as overkill."

Moulin Rouge! holds a rating of 66/100 at Metacritic based on 35 reviews. At Rotten Tomatoes, the film holds a 75% "Fresh" approval rating based on 259 reviews, with an average score of 7.1/10. The website's critics' consensus reads: "A love-it-or-hate-it experience, Moulin Rouge is all style, all giddy, over-the-top spectacle. But it's also daring in its vision and wildly original." In December 2001, the film was named the best film of the year by viewers of Film 2001. Entertainment Weekly ranked it #6 on its list of the top ten movies of the decade, saying, "Baz Luhrmann's trippy pop culture pastiche from 2001 was an aesthetically arresting ode to poetry, passion, and Elton John. It was so good, we'll forgive him for Australia." In 2008, Moulin Rouge! was ranked No. 211 on Empire's 500 Greatest Movies of All Time. In 2025, it was one of the films voted for the "Readers' Choice" edition of The New York Times' list of "The 100 Best Movies of the 21st Century," finishing at number 130. Audiences polled by CinemaScore gave the film an average grade of "B+" on an A+ to F scale.

Moulin Rouge! premiered on DVD and VHS on December 18, 2001. Home Theater Forum rated the DVD release of Moulin Rouge! as the best DVD of 2001. Luhrmann had hand-picked the features and behind-the scenes footage for the two-disc DVD edition.

=== Analysis ===
==== Postmodern ====
Scholarly commentators have interpreted Moulin Rouge! as an exemplary postmodern film, citing its methods of aesthetic expression, symbolism, and ties to both fine art and pop culture as evidence. The film's music also contributes to its postmodern aesthetic. Notably, Moulin Rouge! combines mid-to-late 20th Century melodies and lyrics with a narrative set in fin de siècle France. Scholars Kathryn Conner Bennett and Marsha Kinder have argued that the use of famous popular songs in a new, original context requires audiences to reinterpret their significance within the framework of the narrative and challenge an assumption that music's symbolism is static.

Moulin Rouge! also makes ample use of other postmodern filmmaking techniques, including fragmentation and juxtaposition. As the film's protagonist, Christian is the primary source of Moulin Rouge!'s story line and many portions of the story are told from his point of view. However, the narrative is fragmented on several occasions when the film deviates from Christian's perspective or integrates a flashback. Moulin Rouge! also juxtaposes a play-within-a-film (Spectacular Spectacular) with the film's events themselves to draw parallels between the plot of the play and the characters' lives. This culminates in the "Come What May" sequence, which reveals the development of Christian and Satine's relationship alongside the progression of Spectacular Spectacular's rehearsals.

Postmodernism is also evident in Moulin Rouge!'s homage to Western musicals, Bollywood masala films, and music videos, as well as Luhrmann's film Strictly Ballroom.

== Accolades ==
Moulin Rouge! received eight Academy Award nominations, including Best Picture and Best Actress (Nicole Kidman), winning in two categories for Best Art Direction and Best Costume Design. It became the first musical film to receive a coveted Best Picture nomination since Beauty and the Beast (1991). Despite the film's overwhelming success, Baz Luhrmann was notably excluded from the Best Director lineup; commenting on this during the Oscar ceremony, host Whoopi Goldberg remarked, "I guess Moulin Rouge! just directed itself." Additionally, the only original tune in the film, "Come What May" was disqualified from the Best Original Song consideration because it was originally intended, although unused, for Luhrmann's previous film Romeo + Juliet and not written expressly for Moulin Rouge!. It tied with The Lord of the Rings: The Fellowship of the Ring for leading twelve nominations at the 55th British Academy Film Awards and resulted in three wins, including Best Actor in a Supporting Role (Jim Broadbent). The musical also led the 59th Golden Globe Awards, alongside the drama A Beautiful Mind, each receiving six nominations; it won three, including Best Motion Picture – Musical or Comedy.

Other notable ceremonies where it received much recognition included the American Film Institute Awards, the Australian Film Institute Awards, and the Satellite Awards. Various prestigious award bodies, such as the National Board of Review and the PGA Awards named it the best film of the year. It was the last musical film to win NBR's Best Film award until Wicked in 2024.

Award	Category	Subject	Result	Ref.
Academy Awards	Best Picture	Fred Baron, Martin Brown and Baz Luhrmann	Nominated	
Academy Awards	Best Actress	Nicole Kidman	Nominated	
Academy Awards	Best Art Direction	Art Direction: Catherine Martin; Set Decoration: Brigitte Broch	Won	
Academy Awards	Best Cinematography	Donald McAlpine	Nominated	
Academy Awards	Best Costume Design	Catherine Martin and Angus Strathie	Won	
Academy Awards	Best Film Editing	Jill Bilcock	Nominated	
Academy Awards	Best Makeup	Maurizio Silvi and Aldo Signoretti	Nominated	
Academy Awards	Best Sound	Andy Nelson, Anna Behlmer, Roger Savage and Guntis Sics	Nominated	
Australian Film Institute Awards	Best Film	Martin Brown, Fred Baron and Baz Luhrmann	Nominated	
Australian Film Institute Awards	Best Direction	Baz Luhrmann	Nominated	
Australian Film Institute Awards	Best Actor in a Leading Role	Ewan McGregor	Nominated	
Australian Film Institute Awards	Best Actress in a Leading Role	Nicole Kidman	Nominated	
Australian Film Institute Awards	Best Actor in a Supporting Role	Richard Roxburgh	Nominated	
Australian Film Institute Awards	Best Cinematography	Donald McAlpine	Won	
Australian Film Institute Awards	Best Costume Design	Catherine Martin and Angus Strathie	Won	
Australian Film Institute Awards	Best Editing	Jill Bilcock	Won	
Australian Film Institute Awards	Best Production Design	Catherine Martin	Won	
Australian Film Institute Awards	Best Sound	Andy Nelson, Roger Savage and Guntis Sics	Won	
ACE Eddie Awards	Best Edited Feature Film – Comedy or Musical	Jill Bilcock	Won	
British Academy Film Awards	Best Film	Fred Baron, Martin Brown and Baz Luhrmann	Nominated	
British Academy Film Awards	Best Direction	Baz Luhrmann	Nominated	
British Academy Film Awards	Best Supporting Actor	Jim Broadbent	Won	
British Academy Film Awards	Best Original Screenplay	Baz Luhrmann and Craig Pearce	Nominated	
British Academy Film Awards	Best Cinematography	Donald McAlpine	Nominated	
British Academy Film Awards	Best Costume Design	Catherine Martin and Angus Strathie	Nominated	
British Academy Film Awards	Best Editing	Jill Bilcock	Nominated	
British Academy Film Awards	Best Makeup and Hair	Maurizio Silvi and Aldo Signoretti	Nominated	
British Academy Film Awards	Best Original Film Music	Craig Armstrong and Marius De Vries	Won	
British Academy Film Awards	Best Production Design	Catherine Martin	Nominated	
British Academy Film Awards	Best Sound	Andy Nelson, Anna Behlmer, Roger Savage, Guntis Sics, Gareth Vanderhope and Antony Gray	Won	
British Academy Film Awards	Best Special Visual Effects	Chris Godfrey, Andy Brown, Nathan McGuinness and Brian Cox	Nominated	
Cannes Film Festival	Palme d'Or	Baz Luhrmann	Nominated	
Golden Globe Awards	Best Motion Picture – Musical or Comedy	Fred Baron, Martin Brown and Baz Luhrmann	Won	
Golden Globe Awards	Best Director - Motion Picture	Baz Luhrmann	Nominated	
Golden Globe Awards	Best Actor - Motion Picture Musical or Comedy	Ewan McGregor	Nominated	
Golden Globe Awards	Best Actress - Motion Picture Musical or Comedy	Nicole Kidman	Won	
Golden Globe Awards	Best Original Score	Craig Armstrong	Won	
Golden Globe Awards	Best Original Song	"Come What May"; Music & Lyrics by David Baerwald	Nominated	
Grammy Awards	Best Compilation Soundtrack for Visual Media	Marius De Vries, Baz Luhrmann and Anton Monsted	Nominated	
National Board of Review Awards	Best Film	Baz Luhrmann	Won	
Producers Guild of America Awards	Best Theatrical Motion Picture	Fred Baron, Martin Brown and Baz Luhrmann	Won	
Satellite Awards	Best Film - Comedy or Musical	Moulin Rouge!	Won	
Satellite Awards	Best Director	Baz Luhrmann	Won	
Satellite Awards	Best Actor - Comedy or Musical	Ewan McGregor	Won	
Satellite Awards	Best Actress - Comedy or Musical	Nicole Kidman	Won	
Satellite Awards	Best Supporting Actor - Comedy or Musical	Jim Broadbent	Won	
Satellite Awards	Best Original Screenplay	Baz Luhrmann and Craig Pearce	Nominated	
Satellite Awards	Best Art Direction and Production Design	Annie Beauchamp, Catherine Martin and Ian Gracie	Won	
Satellite Awards	Best Cinematography	Donald McAlpine	Nominated	
Satellite Awards	Best Costume Design	Catherine Martin and Angus Strathie	Won	
Satellite Awards	Best Editing	Jill Bilcock	Nominated	
Satellite Awards	Best Original Score	Craig Armstrong	Won	
Satellite Awards	Best Original Song	"Come What May" by David Baerwald	Nominated	
Satellite Awards	Best Sound	Andy Nelson, Anna Behlmer, Roger Savage and Guntis Sics	Nominated	
Satellite Awards	Best Visual Effects	Chris Godfrey	Nominated	

American Film Institute recognition

- AFI's 100 Years...100 Songs:
  - "Come What May" – #85
- AFI's Greatest Movie Musicals – #25

== Soundtrack ==
=== Musical numbers ===
- "Nature Boy" – Toulouse
- "Complainte de la Butte/Children of the Revolution"
- "The Sound of Music" – Toulouse, Christian, and Satie
- "Green Fairy Medley" (The Sound of Music/Children of the Revolution/Nature Boy) – Christian, The Bohemians, and the Green Fairy
- "Zidler's Rap Medley" (Lady Marmalade/Zidler's Rap/Because We Can/Smells Like Teen Spirit) – Zidler, Moulin Rouge Dancers, Christian and Patrons
- "Sparkling Diamonds" (Diamonds Are a Girl's Best Friend/Material Girl) – Satine and Moulin Rouge Dancers
- "Sparkling Diamonds" (Reprise) (Rhythm of the Night/Smells Like Teen Spirit/Diamonds Are a Girl's Best Friend)– Satine and Moulin Rouge Dancers
- "Meet Me in the Red Room"
- "Your Song" – Christian
- "Your Song" (Reprise) – Satine
- "The Pitch" - Spectacular Spectacular – Zidler, Christian, Satine, The Duke, and Bohemians
- "One Day I'll Fly Away" – Satine and Christian
- "Elephant Love Medley" – Christian and Satine
- "Górecki" – Satine
- "Like a Virgin" – Zidler, The Duke, and Chorus Boys
- "Come What May" – Christian, Satine, the Argentinean and Cast of Spectacular Spectacular
- "El Tango de Roxanne" – The Argentinean, Christian, Satine, The Duke, and Moulin Rouge Dancers
- "Fool to Believe" – Satine
- "One Day I'll Fly Away" (Reprise) – Satine and Zidler
- "The Show Must Go On" – Zidler, Satine, and Moulin Rouge Stagehands
- "Hindi Sad Diamonds" (Chamma Chamma/Diamonds Are a Girl's Best Friend) – Toulouse, Nini Legs-in-the-Air, Satine, and the Cast of Spectacular Spectacular
- "Come What May" (Reprise) – Satine and Christian
- "Coup d'État"/"Finale" (The Show Must Go On/Children of the Revolution/Your Song/One Day I'll Fly Away/Come What May) – Christian, Satine, and Cast of Spectacular Spectacular
- "Nature Boy" (Reprise) – Toulouse and Christian

Music sources

- "Nature Boy" – Nat King Cole, covered by David Bowie and remixed by Massive Attack for the soundtrack.
- "The Sound of Music" – Mary Martin (and later by Julie Andrews) (from the Rodgers & Hammerstein musical of the same name, featuring overdubbed theremin played by Bruce Woolley)
- "The Lonely Goatherd" – also from The Sound of Music (but heard as instrumental)
- "Lady Marmalade" – Labelle, covered for the film by Christina Aguilera, Lil' Kim, Mýa, and Pink.
- "Because We Can" – Fatboy Slim
- "Complainte de la Butte" – Georges Van Parys and Jean Renoir covered by Rufus Wainwright
- "Rhythm of the Night" – DeBarge
- "Material Girl" – Madonna
- "Smells Like Teen Spirit" – Nirvana
- "Diamonds Are a Girl's Best Friend" – Introduced by Carol Channing, made popular by Marilyn Monroe.
- "Diamond Dogs" – David Bowie covered for the film by Beck.
- "Galop Infernal (Can-can)" – Jacques Offenbach (tune for Spectacular, Spectacular)
- "One Day I'll Fly Away" – Randy Crawford
- "Children of the Revolution" – T.Rex (Covered by Bono, Gavin Friday, Violent Femmes, and Maurice Seezer)
- "Gorecki" – Lamb
- "Come What May" – Ewan McGregor and Nicole Kidman (written by David Baerwald)
- "Roxanne" – The Police (Title in film: "El Tango de Roxanne", combined with music "Tanguera" by Mariano Mores)
- "Tanguera" – Mariano Mores (Title in film: "El Tango de Roxanne", combined with music "Roxanne" by The Police)
- "The Show Must Go On" – Queen
- "Like a Virgin" – Madonna
- "Your Song" – Elton John
- "Chamma Chamma" – Alka Yagnik (Incorporated in the film song titled "Hindi Sad Diamonds"; originally performed by Alka Yagnik in the 1998 Hindi film China Gate, composed by Anu Malik).

Elephant Love Medley

- "Love Is Like Oxygen" by Sweet – Andy Scott and Trevor Griffin
- "Love Is a Many-Splendored Thing" by The Four Aces – Sammy Fain and Paul Francis Webster
- "All You Need Is Love" by The Beatles – John Lennon and Paul McCartney
- "I Was Made for Lovin' You" by Kiss – Desmond Child, Paul Stanley, Vini Poncia
- "One More Night" by Phil Collins – Phil Collins
- "In the Name of Love" by U2 – U2
- "Don't Leave Me This Way" by Harold Melvin & the Blue Notes and later Thelma Houston – Kenneth Gamble, Leon Huff, and Cary Gilbert
- "Silly Love Songs" by Wings – Paul McCartney
- "Up Where We Belong" by Joe Cocker and Jennifer Warnes – Jack Nitzsche and Buffy Sainte-Marie
- "Heroes" by David Bowie – David Bowie
- "I Will Always Love You" by Dolly Parton and later Whitney Houston – Dolly Parton
- "Your Song" by Elton John – Elton John and Bernie Taupin

Jamie Allen contributes additional vocals to the "Elephant Love Medley". "Love Is Like Oxygen" and "Love Is a Many-Splendored Thing" are only spoken dialogue; they are not actually sung in the medley.

"Your Song" is performed by Ewan McGregor and Alessandro Safina, who contributes additional lyrics in Italian.

Two soundtrack albums were released, with the second coming after the first one's massive success. The first volume featured the smash hit single "Lady Marmalade", performed by Christina Aguilera, Lil' Kim, Mýa and Pink. The first soundtrack, Moulin Rouge! Music from Baz Luhrmann's Film, was released on 8 May 2001, with the second, Moulin Rouge! Music from Baz Luhrmann's Film, Vol. 2, following on 26 February 2002.

== Stage adaptation ==
As early as November 2002, Luhrmann revealed that he intended to adapt Moulin Rouge! into a stage musical. A Las Vegas casino was the reputed site of the proposed show. Luhrmann was said to have asked both Kidman and McGregor to reprise their starring roles in the potential stage version.

In 2008, a stage adaptation entitled La Belle Bizarre du Moulin Rouge ("The Bizarre Beauty of the Moulin Rouge") toured Germany and produced a cast recording.

In 2016, it was announced that Global Creatures was developing Moulin Rouge! into a stage musical. Alex Timbers was slated to direct the production, and John Logan was tapped to write the book. Moulin Rouge!: The Musical, starring Aaron Tveit as Christian and Karen Olivo as Satine, premiered on 10 July 2018 at the Colonial Theatre in Boston. The Broadway production opened at the Al Hirschfeld Theatre on 25 July 2019. In May 2025, Boy George, Jordan Fisher, and Solea Pfeiffer were playing the roles of Zidler, Christian, and Satine, respectively.

== In popular culture ==
The 2002 made-for-television movie It's a Very Merry Muppet Christmas Movie features a Christmas-themed parody entitled "Moulin Scrooge", in which various scenes and musical numbers are re-enacted by Muppets. In Moulin Scrooge, Christian is played by Kermit the Frog, Satine (named Saltine) by Miss Piggy, Toulouse-Lautrec by Gonzo and Zidler by Fozzie Bear.

The US music video for "Mr. Brightside" by the Killers was inspired by the film.

In the 2017–18 figure skating season, at the 2018 Winter Olympics, Canadian skaters Tessa Virtue and Scott Moir performed two selections from Moulin Rouge!, interpreting the story of Christian and Satine through "The Show Must Go On", "El Tango de Roxanne", and "Come What May". Their performance won the gold medal in the team and the individual events. At this event, Virtue and Moir became the most decorated skaters of all time.

== See also ==
- Moulin Rouge, 1928 film
- Moulin Rouge, 1952 film
