= In the Kitchen (disambiguation) =

"In the Kitchen" is a song by R. Kelly.

In The Kitchen may also refer to:

== Albums ==
- In the Kitchen (Eddie "Lockjaw" Davis album), 1958

== Songs ==
- "In The Kitchen", a 1958 song by Eddie "Lockjaw" Davis
- "In The Kitchen", a 2005 song by Field Music, included on the compilation Write Your Own History
- "In the Kitchen", a 2005 song by Umphrey's McGee
- "In the Kitchen", a song by Killer Mike from the 2009 album Underground Atlanta
- "In the Kitchen", a song by Matthew Herbert from the 1998 album Around the House
- "In the Kitchen", a song by The Tough Alliance from the 2005 album The New School

== Television ==
- En La Cocina (English: In The Kitchen), an American television cooking program

== Books ==
- In the Kitchen (novel), by Monica Ali
