= Christopher Simpson (actor) =

Irish actor and musical artist

- Born: 1975 (age 50–51); Dublin, Republic of Ireland
- Occupations: Actor; singer; songwriter; audiobook narrator
- Years active: 2002–present
- Musical career
- Origin: London, England
- Genres: Blues; jazz; folk; song cycle
- Instrument: Vocals
- Years active: 2008–2009
- Website: www.christophersimpson.net

Christopher Crawford Gatsinzi Simpson (born 1975) is an Irish actor. He played Karim in the film adaptation of Monica Ali's novel Brick Lane.

== Early life ==
Simpson was born in Dublin, Ireland. His father is Irish and his mother was of Greek-Rwandan descent. His father met his mother in Rwanda whilst training to be a teacher. When Simpson was a child he visited Rwanda with his mother. His mother's first language was Kinyarwanda.

Simpson lived in Dublin until he was six years old. After his parents divorced, he moved to London with his mother and his sister, Fiona, where he has lived ever since.

When Simpson was at primary school, he began attending drama classes on Thursday evenings with an amateur dramatics club.

== Acting career ==
Simpson has often been cast in South Asian roles, although his heritage is mixed European and African.

In 2002, he played twins, Magid and Millat, in White Teeth. In 2003, he starred in Second Generation, and appeared in State of Play.

In 2003, Simpson played a supporting role in Code 46. In 2004, he played the role of Hassan Sabbah in The Keeper: The Legend of Omar Khayyam. In 2005, he appeared in Chromophobia. In 2006, he played a supporting role in Mischief Night. In 2007, he played the lead role of Karim in the film adaptation of Monica Ali's novel Brick Lane, and a supporting role in Exitz.

Simpson had one week to learn the part of Karim for Brick Lane.

In 2008, Simpson was a British Independent Film Awards jury member.

In 2006, Simpson played the role of Dionysus in Conall Morrison's The Bacchae of Baghdad (an updated version of Euripides's play The Bacchae) at the Abbey Theatre.

In 2011, he played the role of Maz in John Donnelly's The Knowledge, and the role of Parvez in Steve Waters' Little Platoons, both at the Bush Theatre.

In 2016, he played the role of Sebastian in Bryony Lavery's adaptation of Brideshead Revisited at the English Touring Theatre and UK National Tour.

== Music career ==
In 2008, whilst he was artist-in-residence with creative arts group Metal Simpson completed a song cycle, Very Present Tense. He wrote it over a number of years in response to the death of his mother. The songs which reference musical idioms, including blues, jazz and Rwandan folk, reflecting his Rwandan and Irish family heritage, The album was developed in collaboration with composer, Tom Havelock.

On 8 August 2008, the song cycle premiered at the arts hub in Edge Hill Station pavilion, during the Liverpool European Capital of Culture. On 29 September 2009, he performed the work for the second time with Metal at the Village Green Festival, this time working with a group of musicians from Southend. Simpson then worked on recording the work.

== Other work ==
In 2001, Simpson made a documentary for BBC Radio 4 called Other, exploring the identities of people who have parents of different origins and have grown up in a culture belonging to neither parent.

Simpson has narrated audio books for Slumdog Millionaire (originally published as Vikas Swarup's Q & A), E. M. Forster's A Passage to India and Hanif Kureishi's The Buddha of Suburbia.

== Personal life ==
In 1996, Simpson's mother died; Simpson and his sister returned to Rwanda to bury her ashes.

== Filmography ==
=== Film ===
| Year | Title | Role | Notes |
|---|---|---|---|
| 2003 | Code 46 | Paul | Supporting role |
| 2005 | Chromophobia | Derek | Supporting role |
| 2005 | The Keeper: The Legend of Omar Khayyam | Hassan Sabbah | Supporting role |
| 2006 | Take 3 Girls | Rafiq | Supporting role |
| 2006 | Mischief Night | Big Man Qassim | Supporting role |
| 2007 | Exitz | Dr. Murli Patel | Supporting role |
| 2007 | Brick Lane | Karim | Lead role |
| 2008 | My Father's Son | Ameer | Short |
| 2009 | Little Foxes | Jeff | Supporting role |
| 2009 | It's a Wonderful Afterlife | J.J Jaan | Supporting role |
| 2010 | Ever Here I Be | Jason | Short |
| 2012 | Day of the Flowers | Ernesto | Supporting role |
| 2013 | Sixteen | Headmaster | Supporting role |

=== Television ===
| Year | Title | Role | Notes |
|---|---|---|---|
| 2002 | White Teeth | Magid Iqbal/Millat Iqbal | 2 episodes: "The Trouble with Millat", "The Return of Magid Iqbal" |
| 2003 | State of Play | Adam Greene | 4 episodes: "#1.1", "#1.3", "#1.5", "#1.6" |
| 2003 | Second Generation | Sam Khan | 2 episodes: "#1.1", "#1.2" |
| 2005 | All About George | Ash | 6 episodes: "#1.1", "#1.2", "#1.3", "#1.4", "#1.5", "#1.6" |
| 2005 | The Man-Eating Leopard of Rudraprayag | Sanji | TV film |
| 2007 | Shameless | Murad | 1 episode: "#4.4" |
| 2007 | Be More Ethnic | Sol De Silva | TV film |
| 2008 | Spooks: Code 9 | Vik | 6 episodes: "#1.1", "#1.2", "#1.3", "#1.4", "#1.5", "#1.6" |
| 2017 | The Good Karma Hospital | Anton Kartik | 1 episode: "#1.2" |

=== Stage ===
| Year | Title | Role | Venue |
|---|---|---|---|
| 2001 | The Ramayana | Bharatha | Royal National Theatre |
| 2002 | Pericles | Pericles | Royal Shakespeare Company/Cardboard Citizens |
| 2003 | Fragile Land | Omar | Hampstead Theatre |
| 2006 | The Bacchae of Baghdad | Dionysus | Abbey Theatre |
| 2007 | Fallujah | Iraqi gunman | Institute of Contemporary Arts/Old Truman Brewery |
| 2011 | The Knowledge | Maz | Bush Theatre |
| 2011 | Little Platoons | Parvez | Bush Theatre |
| 2012 | LeanerFasterStronger | Voice | Sheffield Theatres |
| 2012 | Forests | Orlando | Birmingham Repertory Theatre |
| 2016 | Brideshead Revisited | Sebastian | English Touring Theatre/UK National Tour |

== Discography ==
=== Albums ===
| Album Title | Album details | Chart positions | Certifications |
|---|---|---|---|
| Very Present Tense | Released: 8 August 2008; Label: Formats: Digital Download | | |
