= Brick Lane (2007 film) =

2007 British drama film directed by Sarah Gavron

- Directed by: Sarah Gavron
- Written by: Monica Ali; Laura Jones; Abi Morgan
- Produced by: Alison Owen
- Starring: Tannishtha Chatterjee; Satish Kaushik; Christopher Simpson; Naeema Begum; Lana Rahman; Lalita Ahmed
- Cinematography: Robbie Ryan
- Edited by: Melanie Oliver
- Music by: Jocelyn Pook
- Production companies: Film4 Productions; Ingenious Film Partners; UK Film Council; Ruby Films
- Distributed by: Optimum Releasing
- Release date: 16 November 2007
- Running time: 101 minutes
- Country: United Kingdom
- Languages: English; Bengali
- Budget: $2.5 million
- Box office: $3.8 million

Brick Lane is a 2007 British drama film directed by Sarah Gavron in her directorial debut and adapted from the 2003 novel of the same name by the British writer Monica Ali. The screenplay was written by Laura Jones and Abi Morgan.

The Indian actress Tannishtha Chatterjee played the lead role of Nazneen. The film had its first public screening at the Telluride Film Festival in the United States.

== Plot ==
The movie largely takes place in London following the September 11 attacks on the United States by al-Qaeda, and reflects a period of heightened racial tensions in Britain as well.

The film tells the story of Nazneen, who has grown up in rural Bangladesh in the district of Mymensingh. The young Nazneen and her sister share a seemingly idyllic childhood in their village, but their mother tragically drowns herself one day because she cannot handle the hardship of their life. Their father marries Nazneen, elder of the two girls, to a middle-aged educated man called Chanu, who lives in London. Leaving behind her sister and her family home in Bangladesh, Nazneen's new husband takes her to the United Kingdom where they live in a small flat on Brick Lane, the centre of the British Bengali community.

Seventeen years later, Nazneen and Chanu are raising their two daughters in London. Life is hard for the homesick Nazneen; her first child, a son, died as a baby in his cot; the flat is small and cramped; and her only resources are for groceries. On top of this, Brick Lane is harassed by bigoted people handing out flyers that fan irrational fears of Muslim extremists taking over the streets of London. Married but not in love, Nazneen lives vicariously through the letters she receives from her sister about her carefree life and love affairs. She misses her sister and yearns to get back home.

Having been passed over for promotion he was certain he was due, the prideful Chanu resigns from his job and Nazneen gets a sewing machine from a neighbour to earn extra money mending jeans. She strikes up a friendship with the charismatic Karim, who delivers clothes to her for work.

The Bangladeshi Muslim community in London is becoming increasingly religious in nature, and Karim invites Nazneen to a Muslim "Unite" program run by the Bengal Tigers. Nazneen learns to her dismay that Chanu has borrowed money from a loan shark with a bad reputation. While out at a market, Karim sees her and invites her to his uncle's factory. They kiss, and begin an affair.

Following an angry exchange with her husband, Nazneen comes to understand that the reason why her sister has been describing so many illicit affairs is because she is working as a prostitute; overwhelmed, Nazneen has an emotional breakdown. Chanu begins to prepare the family to return to Bangladesh as Nazneen recovers, buying airplane tickets and packing up their things. Meanwhile, Karim goes away to see his family in Bradford. Upon his return, he tells her he turned down marriage with another girl for Nazneen. Their conversation is interrupted by Nazneen's elder daughter who later questions Nazneen's relationship with Karim.

A woman representing the loan sharks harasses Nazneen for more money that is supposedly owed. Her daughters voice their displeasure about leaving Britain to go to Bangladesh. She confronts her husband about the debt he owes the loan sharks which he brushes off. Chanu and Nazneen attend a Muslim rally in a town hall and Chanu berates the tone of the gathering but they rebuff his statements.

Nazneen informs Karim that she does not want to marry him because she is "no longer the girl from the village." Karim leaves broken-hearted and in tears. Nazneen tells the loan shark off, saying she has overpaid the debt her husband owes, and the lady leaves after she refuses to swear on the Quran that they owe more. Their eldest daughter confronts both Chanu and Nazneen about her own desire to stay in London. She then runs off into the streets while a festival is ongoing as her mother runs after her. Nazneen catches up to her at the train station. Chanu and Nazneen share a heart to heart about staying and leaving. Despite always longing for her 'home', Nazneen realizes her home is where her children are happy. Chanu decides that he will leave and that they will follow him at a later date.

== Casting and production ==
Tannishtha Chatterjee was the first actress who auditioned for the role of Nazneen. Two months after her initial audition, after Gavron had seen several hundred women, Gavron hired her. Both Christopher Simpson, who played Karim, and Chatterjee studied the Bangladeshi culture in Brick Lane by following around locals. Satish Kaushik was cast after Gavron saw a picture of him on the Internet. Since Brick Lane was his first English-language film, he took lessons from a diction coach to improve his accent.

Many residents of Brick Lane were hired as extras to appear on the film, and some members of crew were hired from the local area. The film's winter scenes were shot in the middle of a heat wave in Summer 2006, which required the production team to use artificial snow. Portions of the film were shot in West Bengal.

Ruby Films was the production company. Sarah Gavron intended to film some scenes in Brick Lane. Because of opposition from some of the local community, police advised her to change locations after demonstrations were threatened.

The novel and film provoked criticism by some in the Bangladeshi community in London, who thought that Chanu, and the Bangladeshis from Sylhet generally, were portrayed in a negative way. Some traders organised against having the film company doing any production in the neighbourhood; on 31 July 2006, about 120 British Bangladeshis held a protest in Brick Lane. Others wrote letters to the editor in The Guardian and spoke in support of the film production, including the British chapter of PEN and the writer Salman Rushdie.

== Cast ==
- Tannishtha Chatterjee as Nazneen Ahmed
- Satish Kaushik as Chanu Ahmed
- Christopher Simpson as Karim
- Naeema Begum as Rukshana 'Shahna' Ahmed
- Lana Rahman as Bibi Ahmed
- Lalita Ahmed as Mrs. Islam
- Harvey Virdi as Razia
- Zafreen as Hasina
- Harsh Nayyar as Dr. Azad
- Abdul Nlephaz Ali as Tariq
- Bijal Chandaria as Shefali

== Critical reception ==
Brick Lane was well received by most critics. On review aggregator Rotten Tomatoes, the film has a rating of 68% based on 101 reviews with a weighted average score of 6.2/10. The site's consensus states: "Frustratingly slow-moving, but ultimately saved by Chatterjee's solid acting and Gavron's gentle patience." On Metacritic, the film has a normalized score of 61% based on 25 critics, indicating "generally favorable reviews". Roger Ebert praised the film's characters for their "depth and reality." Several critics, including Robert Koehler of Variety, compared it unfavourably with the novel. The film was also praised in France.

As a result of the earlier controversy and a threatened protest, a planned screening for Prince Charles and the Duchess of Cornwall was cancelled.

== Soundtrack ==
Brick Lane

Soundtrack album by Jocelyn Pook
- Released: 19 November 2007
- Genre: Film soundtrack
- Label: Universal Classics
- Producer: Jocelyn Pook

1. "Adam's Lullaby" - (Natacha Atlas) - 3:05
2. "Memories of a Summer" - 4:02
3. "Poem" - 1:56
4. "Running Through the Night" - 3:10
5. "Song of the Boatman" - 3:47
6. "A World Changed" - 2:34
7. "Quiet Joy" - 3:03
8. "Picnic at the Palace" - 1:55
9. "Tapur Tapur" - 2:45
10. "Love Blossoms" - 2:44
11. "Rite of Passage" - 2:02
12. "Departure" - 1:46
13. "Leelabali" - 2:38
14. "Childhood Fragments" - 1:48
15. "Dreaiming" - 6:04
16. "Playing in the Paddy Fields" - 2:57
17. "The First Kiss" - 1:47
18. "Dol Dol Duluni" - Traditional (Tannishtha Chatterjee) - 1:51

== Awards ==
Sarah Gavron was nominated for a BAFTA award. Both Tannishtha Chatterjee and Sarah Gavron were nominated for BIFA awards, for the best actress and best director in 2007, respectively. The film won a Silver Hitchcock and best screenplay at the Dinard Festival of British Cinema.

== DVD release ==
The film was released in the UK on 16 November 2007, and in the US by Sony Pictures Classics in a limited release on 20 June 2008. The DVD Region 2 release occurred on 10 March 2008 and the Region 1 DVD of the film was released on 13 January 2009.

== See also ==
- List of cultural references to the September 11 attacks
