= List of Fox Searchlight Pictures films (2010–2019) =

This is a list of films produced by Fox Searchlight Pictures (now Searchlight Pictures) beginning in 2010 up until 2019.

== 2010 ==
Release date	Title	Notes
February 12, 2010	My Name Is Khan	North American distribution only; produced by Fox Star Studios, Dharma Productions, Red Chillies Entertainment and Imagenation Abu Dhabi
March 12, 2010	Our Family Wedding	co-production with Sneak Preview Entertainment
May 14, 2010	Just Wright	co-production with Flavor Unit Entertainment and Martin Chase Productions
June 18, 2010	Cyrus	co-production with Scott Free Productions; Nominated - Critics' Choice Movie Award for Best Comedy
September 15, 2010	Never Let Me Go	British film; co-production with DNA Films and Film4; Nominated - BIFA for Best British Independent Film
October 15, 2010	Conviction	distribution in North America, the U.K., Ireland, Australia, New Zealand, South Africa, France and Japan only; produced by Omega Entertainment and Longfellow Pictures
November 5, 2010	127 Hours	distribution outside the U.K., Ireland, France and Switzerland only; co-production with Pathé, Everest Entertainment, Cloud Eight Films, Decibel Films, HandMade Films and Film4; Nominated - Academy Award for Best Picture; Nominated - BAFTA Award for Outstanding British Film; Nominated - Critics' Choice Movie Award for Best Picture; Nominated - Independent Spirit Award for Best Film; Nominated - Producers Guild of America Award for Best Theatrical Motion Picture
December 3, 2010	Black Swan (Note: Co-owned by Revolution Studios)	co-production with Cross Creek Pictures, Protozoa Pictures and Phoenix Pictures; Independent Spirit Award for Best Film; Nominated - Academy Award for Best Picture; Nominated - BAFTA Award for Best Film; Nominated - Critics' Choice Movie Award for Best Picture; Nominated - César Award for Best Foreign Film; Nominated - Golden Globe Award for Best Motion Picture - Drama; Nominated - Golden Lion; Nominated - Gotham Independent Film Award for Best Feature; Nominated - Producers Guild of America Award for Best Theatrical Motion Picture

== 2011 ==
Release date	Title	Notes
February 11, 2011	Cedar Rapids	co-production with Ad Hominem Enterprises
March 18, 2011	Win Win	co-production with Everest Entertainment, Groundswell Productions and Next Wednesday
May 27, 2011	The Tree of Life	U.S., U.K. and Irish distribution only; produced by River Road Entertainment and Plan B Entertainment; Gotham Independent Film Award for Best Feature; Palme d'Or; Nominated - Academy Award for Best Picture; Nominated - Critics' Choice Movie Award for Best Picture
June 17, 2011	The Art of Getting By	distribution outside Latin America, the Middle East and Israel only; produced by Gigi Films, Goldcrest Films, Mint Pictures, Atlantic Pictures and Island Bound Productions; Nominated - Grand Jury Prize Dramatic
July 15, 2011	Snow Flower and the Secret Fan	North American, U.K. and Irish distribution only; produced by IDG China Media and Big Feet Productions
July 22, 2011	Another Earth	distribution only; produced by Artists Public Domain; Nominated - Grand Jury Prize Dramatic
September 30, 2011	Margaret	co-production with Camelot Pictures, Gilbert Films, Mirage Enterprises and Scott Rudin Productions
October 21, 2011	Martha Marcy May Marlene	distribution only; produced by Maybach Cunningham, FilmHaven Entertainment, Borderline Films and This is that Nominated - Grand Jury Prize Dramatic
November 18, 2011	The Descendants	co-production with Ad Hominem Enterprises; Golden Globe Award for Best Motion Picture - Drama; Nominated - Academy Award for Best Picture; Nominated - BAFTA Award for Best Film; Nominated - Critics' Choice Movie Award for Best Picture; Nominated - Independent Spirit Award for Best Film; Nominated - Producers Guild of America Award for Best Theatrical Motion Picture
December 2, 2011	Shame	U.S. distribution only; produced by Film4, UK Film Council, Alliance Films, LipSync Productions and See-Saw Films; Nominated - BAFTA Award for Outstanding British Film; Nominated - BIFA for Best British Independent Film; Nominated - European Film Award for Best Film; Nominated - Golden Lion; Nominated - Independent Spirit Award for Best Foreign Film

== 2012 ==
Release date	Title	Notes
April 27, 2012	Sound of My Voice	distribution in North America, the U.K., Ireland, Australia, New Zealand, South Africa and India only; produced by 1737 Films and Skyscraper Films
May 4, 2012	The Best Exotic Marigold Hotel	co-production with Participant Media, Imagenation Abu Dhabi FZ and Blueprint Pictures; Nominated - BAFTA Award for Outstanding British Film; Nominated - BIFA for Best British Independent Film; Nominated - Golden Globe Award for Best Motion Picture - Musical or Comedy
June 8, 2012	Lola Versus	distribution outside Latin America, Australia, New Zealand, Italy, Scandinavia, Greece, Cyprus, Hungary, Romania, the Czech Republic, Slovakia, Bulgaria, former Yugoslavia, the Baltics, the CIS and the Middle East only; produced by Groundswell Productions
June 27, 2012	Beasts of the Southern Wild	U.S. distribution only; produced by Cinereach, Court 13 and Journeyman Pictures; Grand Jury Prize Dramatic; Nominated - Academy Award for Best Picture; Nominated - Critics' Choice Movie Award for Best Picture; Nominated - Independent Spirit Award for Best Film; Nominated - Producers Guild of America Award for Best Theatrical Motion Picture
July 6, 2012	The Do-Deca-Pentathlon	co-distribution with Red Flag Releasing only
July 25, 2012	Ruby Sparks	co-production with Bona Fide Productions
October 19, 2012	The Sessions	distribution only; produced by Such Much Films and Rhino Films; Nominated - Grand Jury Prize Dramatic
November 23, 2012	Hitchcock	distribution only; produced by Cold Spring Pictures and the Montecito Picture Company

== 2013 ==
Release date	Title	Notes
March 1, 2013	Stoker	co-production with Indian Paintbrush and Scott Free Productions
April 5, 2013	Trance	distribution outside the U.K., Ireland, France and Switzerland only; co-production with Pathé, Cloud Eight Films, Decibel Films, Film4 and Indian Paintbrush; U.K. and Irish distribution handled by Pathé via 20th Century Fox
May 31, 2013	The East	co-production with Scott Free Productions
July 5, 2013	The Way, Way Back	distribution in North America, the U.K., Ireland, France, Germany, Austria, Switzerland, Italy, Spain, Greece, Cyprus, the Benelux, Hungary, the Czech Republic, Slovakia, the Middle East and Asia excluding Hong Kong and Taiwan only; produced by Sycamore Pictures, the Walsh Company, OddLot Entertainment and What Just Happened Productions; Nominated - Critics' Choice Movie Award for Best Comedy
September 18, 2013	Enough Said	co-production with Likely Story; Nominated - Critics' Choice Movie Award for Best Comedy
September 27, 2013	Baggage Claim	co-production with 260 Degrees and Sneak Preview Entertainment
October 18, 2013	12 Years a Slave	North American distribution only; produced by Regency Enterprises, River Road Entertainment, Plan B Entertainment, New Regency and Film4; Academy Award for Best Picture; BAFTA Award for Best Film; Critics' Choice Movie Award for Best Picture; Golden Globe Award for Best Motion Picture - Drama; Independent Spirit Award for Best Film; Producers Guild of America Award for Best Theatrical Motion Picture; Toronto International Film Festival People's Choice Award; Nominated - Gotham Independent Film Award for Best Feature; Inducted into the National Film Registry in 2023
November 27, 2013	Black Nativity	co-production with Maven Pictures and Wonderful Films

== 2014 ==
Release date	Title	Notes
March 7, 2014	The Grand Budapest Hotel	co-production with Indian Paintbrush, Studio Babelsberg and American Empirical Pictures; Critics' Choice Movie Award for Best Comedy; Golden Globe Award for Best Motion Picture - Musical or Comedy; Jury Grand Prix (Berlin Film Festival); Nominated - Academy Award for Best Picture; Nominated - BAFTA Award for Best Film; Nominated - Critics' Choice Movie Award for Best Picture; Nominated - Golden Bear; Nominated - Gotham Independent Film Award for Best Feature; Nominated - Producers Guild of America Award for Best Theatrical Motion Picture; Inducted into the National Film Registry in 2025
March 21, 2014	Starred Up	U.K. and Irish distribution only; produced by Film4, Creative Scotland, Quickfire Films, Northern Ireland Screen, LipSync Productions and Sigma Films; Nominated - BIFA for Best British Independent Film
April 2, 2014	Dom Hemingway	distribution in North America, France, Germany, Austria, Switzerland, Italy, Spain, Portugal, the Benelux, Poland and Asia excluding Taiwan only; produced by BBC Films and Recorded Picture Company
May 2, 2014	Belle	British film; distribution outside the Benelux, Portugal, Greece, Cyprus, the Middle East, Australia and New Zealand only; produced by Head Gear Films and DJ Films
July 18, 2014	I Origins	distribution only; produced by Verisimilitude, WeWork Studios, Bersin Pictures and Penny Jane Films
August 1, 2014	Calvary	distribution outside Canada, the U.K., Ireland, Australia, New Zealand, Germany, Austria, Switzerland, the Baltics and the CIS only; produced by LipSync Productions, Reprisal Films and Octagon Films; Nominated - BIFA for Best British Independent Film
September 12, 2014	The Drop	co-production with Chernin Entertainment
October 17, 2014	Birdman or (The Unexpected Virtue of Ignorance)	distribution in all media excluding international digital, streaming and television only; co-production with Regency Enterprises, New Regency, M Productions, Le Grisbi Productions and Worldview Entertainment; Academy Award for Best Picture; César Award for Best Foreign Film; Gotham Independent Film Award for Best Feature; Independent Spirit Award for Best Film; Producers Guild of America Award for Best Theatrical Motion Picture; Nominated - BAFTA Award for Best Film; Nominated - Critics' Choice Movie Award for Best Comedy; Nominated - Critics' Choice Movie Award for Best Picture; Nominated - Golden Globe Award for Best Motion Picture - Musical or Comedy; Nominated - Golden Lion
December 5, 2014	Wild	distribution only; produced by Pacific Standard and River Road Entertainment (uncredited)

== 2015 ==
Release date	Title	Notes
March 6, 2015	The Second Best Exotic Marigold Hotel	co-production with Participant Media, Imagenation Abu Dhabi and Blueprint Pictures
April 17, 2015	True Story	distribution in all media excluding international digital, streaming and television only; produced by Regency Enterprises, New Regency and Plan B Entertainment
May 1, 2015	Far From the Madding Crowd	British film; distribution outside U.K. free television only; co-production with BBC Films and DNA Films
June 12, 2015	Me and Earl and the Dying Girl	distribution only; produced by Indian Paintbrush and Rhode Island Ave. Grand Jury Prize Dramatic
August 14, 2015	Mistress America	distribution only; produced by RT Features
October 2, 2015	He Named Me Malala	co-distribution outside France and French-speaking Switzerland with National Geographic Documentary Films only; produced by Imagenation Abu Dhabi and Participant Media; Annie Award for Best Animated Special Production; Nominated - BAFTA Award for Best Documentary; Nominated - Critics' Choice Movie Award for Best Documentary Feature
November 4, 2015	Brooklyn	distribution outside Canada, Latin America, the U.K., Ireland, Australia, New Zealand, South Africa, Portugal, Greece, Cyprus and Hong Kong only; produced by BBC Films, Wildgaze Films, Finola Dwyer Productions and Parallel Films; BAFTA Award for Outstanding British Film; Nominated - Academy Award for Best Picture; Nominated - Canadian Screen Award for Best Motion Picture; Nominated - Critics' Choice Movie Award for Best Picture; Nominated - Producers Guild of America Award for Best Theatrical Motion Picture
December 4, 2015	Youth	North American distribution only; produced by Indigo Film, Number 9 Films, Film4, Canal+, France Télévisions, Barbary Films and Mediaset Premium; European Film Award for Best Film; Nominated - Palme d'Or

== 2016 ==
Release date	Title	Notes
April 8, 2016	Demolition	distribution in the U.S., the U.K., Ireland, Australia, New Zealand, France, Germany and Austria only; co-production with Black Label Media, Sidney Kimmel Entertainment and Mr. Mudd
May 13, 2016	A Bigger Splash	U.S. distribution only; produced by StudioCanal, Frenesy Film Company and Cota Films; Nominated - Golden Lion
July 22, 2016	Absolutely Fabulous: The Movie	distribution outside U.K. free television only; co-production with BBC Films, DJ Films and Saunders & French Productions
October 7, 2016	The Birth of a Nation	distribution only; produced by Bron Studios, Phantom Four, Mandalay Pictures and Tiny Giant Entertainment; Grand Jury Prize Dramatic
December 2, 2016	Jackie	North American distribution only; produced by LD Entertainment, Wild Bunch, Fabula, Why Not Productions, Endemol Shine Studios, Bliss Media and Protozoa Pictures; Nominated - Golden Lion; Nominated - Independent Spirit Award for Best Film

== 2017 ==
Release date	Title	Notes
February 10, 2017	A United Kingdom	North American distribution only; produced by Pathé, BBC Films and BFI
March 3, 2017	Table 19	co-production with 3311 Productions and 21 Laps Entertainment
March 24, 2017	Wilson	co-production with Ad Hominem Enterprises and Next Wednesday
April 7, 2017	Gifted	distribution outside Australia, New Zealand and Israel only; co-production with FilmNation Entertainment, Grade A Entertainment and DayDay Films
June 9, 2017	My Cousin Rachel	co-production with Free Range Films
August 4, 2017	STEP	distribution only; produced by Stick Figure Productions; Nominated - Grand Jury Prize Documentary
August 18, 2017	Patti Cake$	distribution only; produced by Department of Motion Pictures, RT Features and Stay Gold Features; rights licensed to Diaphana Distribution for France, Cinéart for the Benelux and Lev Cinemas for Israel; Nominated - Grand Jury Prize Dramatic
September 22, 2017	Battle of the Sexes	co-production with Decibel Films and Cloud Eight Films; Nominated - GLAAD Media Award for Outstanding Film - Wide Release
October 13, 2017	Goodbye Christopher Robin	British film; co-production with DJ Films and Gasworks Media
November 10, 2017	Three Billboards Outside Ebbing, Missouri	distribution outside U.K. free television only; co-production with Film4, Blueprint Pictures and Cutting Edge Group; BAFTA Award for Best Film; BAFTA Award for Outstanding British Film; Golden Globe Award for Best Motion Picture – Drama; Toronto International Film Festival People's Choice Award; Nominated - Academy Award for Best Picture; Nominated - BIFA for Best British Independent Film; Nominated - Critics' Choice Movie Award for Best Picture; Nominated - Golden Lion; Nominated - Producers Guild of America Award for Best Theatrical Motion Picture
December 1, 2017	The Shape of Water	co-production with Double Dare You Productions; Academy Award for Best Picture; Critics' Choice Movie Award for Best Picture; Golden Lion; Producers Guild of America Award for Best Theatrical Motion Picture; Nominated - BAFTA Award for Best Film; Nominated - Golden Globe Award for Best Motion Picture - Drama

== 2018 ==
Release date	Title	Notes
March 23, 2018	Isle of Dogs	distribution only; produced by Indian Paintbrush and American Empirical Pictures; Nominated - Academy Award for Best Animated Feature; Nominated - Annie Award for Best Animated Feature; Nominated - BAFTA Award for Best Animated Film; Nominated - Critics' Choice Movie Award for Best Animated Feature; Nominated - Golden Bear; Nominated - Golden Globe Award for Best Animated Feature Film; Nominated - Producers Guild of America Award for Best Animated Motion Picture
April 20, 2018	Super Troopers 2	co-production with Broken Lizard Industries and Cataland Films
September 28, 2018	The Old Man & the Gun	North American, U.K. and Irish distribution only; produced by Endgame Entertainment, Condé Nast Entertainment, Sailor Bear, Identity Films, Tango Productions and Wildwood Enterprises
October 19, 2018	Can You Ever Forgive Me?	co-production with Archer Gray Productions; Nominated - GLAAD Media Award for Outstanding Film - Limited Release
November 23, 2018	The Favourite	distribution outside U.K. free television only; produced by Film4, Waypoint Entertainment, Element Pictures, Scarlet Films and Arcana; BAFTA Award for Outstanding British Film; BIFA for Best British Independent Film; European Film Award for Best Film; Grand Jury Prize (Venice Film Festival); Nominated - Academy Award for Best Picture; Nominated - BAFTA Award for Best Film; Nominated - Critics' Choice Movie Award for Best Comedy; Nominated - Critics' Choice Movie Award for Best Picture; Nominated - Golden Globe Award for Best Motion Picture - Musical or Comedy; Nominated - Golden Lion; Nominated - Independent Spirit Award for Best International Film; Nominated - Producers Guild of America Award for Best Theatrical Motion Picture; Nominated - Queer Lion

== 2019 ==
Release date	Title	Notes
March 15, 2019	The Aftermath	distribution outside U.K. free television only; co-production with Amusement Park Films, Scott Free Productions and BBC Films; last film released before the Disney purchase
May 10, 2019	Tolkien	co-production with Chernin Entertainment; first film released after the Disney purchase
August 21, 2019	Ready or Not	co-production with Mythology Entertainment and Vinson Films
October 4, 2019	Lucy in the Sky	co-production with Pacific Standard and 26 Keys Productions
October 18, 2019	Jojo Rabbit	co-production with Defender Films and Piki Films; Toronto International Film Festival People's Choice Award; Nominated - Academy Award for Best Picture; Nominated - Critics' Choice Movie Award for Best Comedy; Nominated - Critics' Choice Movie Award for Best Picture; Nominated - Golden Globe Award for Best Motion Picture – Musical or Comedy; Nominated - Producers Guild of America Award for Best Theatrical Motion Picture
December 13, 2019	A Hidden Life	distribution outside France, Germany, Austria, Scandinavia, Portugal, Greece, Cyprus, former Yugoslavia, the CIS, the Middle East, Israel and China only; produced by Elizabeth Bay Productions, Aceway and Studio Babelsberg; Last feature film released under the Fox Searchlight Pictures name Nominated - Independent Spirit Award for Best Film; Nominated - Palme d'Or
