= Cloud Eight Films =

English film production company

Cloud Eight Films Ltd.
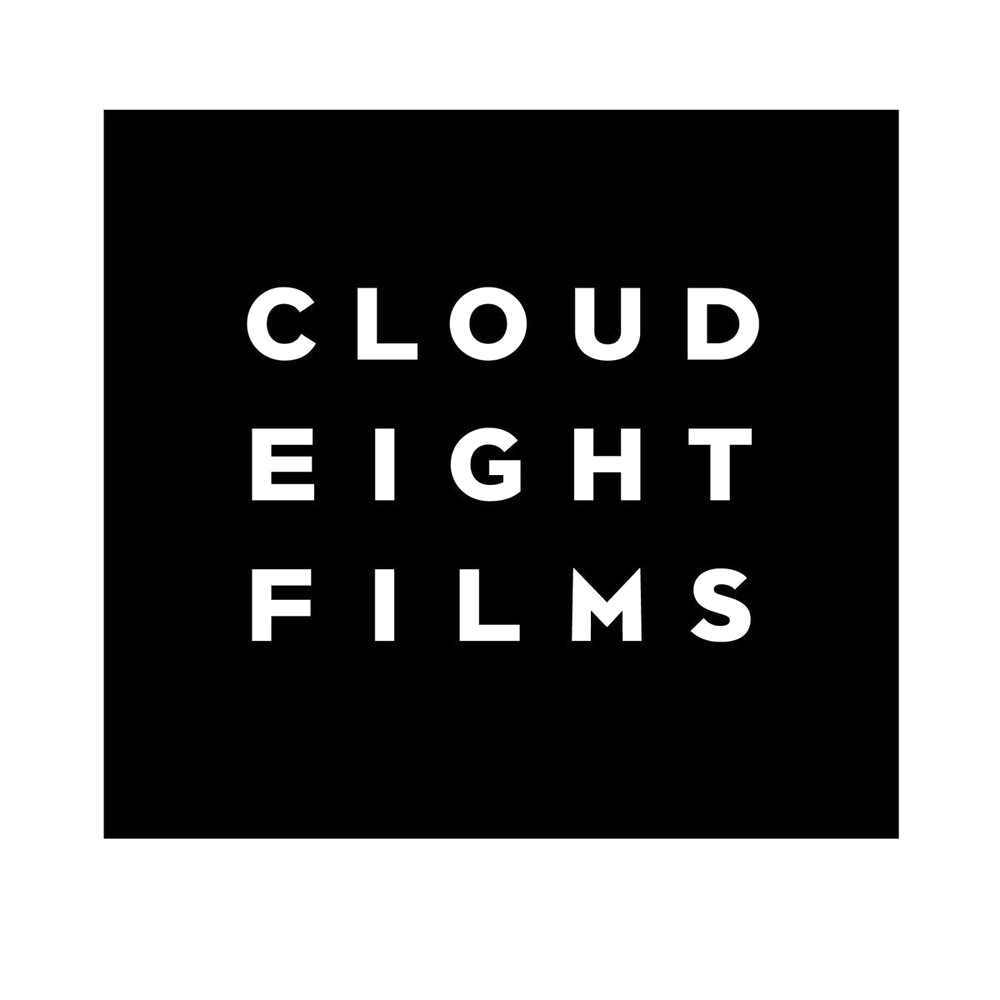
- Formerly: Cloud Nine Films (2009); Colson Films (2008-2009)
- Type: Private
- Industry: Motion picture
- Founded: 19 December 2008; 17 years ago
- Founder: Christian Colson
- Headquarters: 71 Queen Victoria Street, London EC4V 4BE, United Kingdom
- Area served: Worldwide
- Subsidiaries: Selma Films

Cloud Eight Films (originally known as Cloud Eight) is a British production company founded on 19 December 2008 by Christian Colson, based in London, England. It is known for film such as 127 Hours, Selma and Steve Jobs and currently owns a sister production company named Selma Films.

== History ==
The company was founded on 19 December 2008 in London, England by Christian Colson, who originally was managing director at Celador. It was founded as Colson Films, but renamed on 28 March 2009 to Cloud Nine Films, alongside setting up a first-look deal with Pathé within the same month and then to Cloud Eight Films on 19 November. In February 2011, however, producer Ivana MacKinnon left the company to produce Cheerleaders 3D, to be directed by Tom Harper. In May, author Monica Ali was reported to have sold the film rights of Untold Story to the company.

On 7 October 2013 English filmmaker Danny Boyle was announced to be making a film based on documentary Smash and Grab: The Story of the Pink Panthers with Cloud Eight Films to produce. On 11 October, FX ordered a 10-part miniseries titled Telemark, through Boyle's Decibel Films and Cloud Eight Films. In October 2014, FX granted both Colson and Boyle a first look deal, in which films would still be produced through Decibel Films and Cloud Eight Films, following their collaboration on Telemark. In July 2015, Cloud Eight's Steve Jobs was announced as the Centerpiece for the New York Film Festival at the Film Society of Lincoln Center.

== Filmography ==
Year	Film	Director	Distributor
2010	127 Hours	Danny Boyle	Fox Searchlight Pictures; Pathé; Warner Bros.
2013	Trance	Danny Boyle	Fox Searchlight Pictures
2014	Selma	Ava DuVernay	Paramount Pictures
2015	Steve Jobs	Danny Boyle	Universal Studios
2017	T2 Trainspotting	Danny Boyle	TriStar Pictures
2017	Battle of the Sexes	Jonathan Dayton and Valerie Faris	Fox Searchlight Pictures
