= In the Kitchen (novel) =

2009 novel by Monica Ali

In the Kitchen: A Novel
- The front cover of the first edition (hardcover)
- Author: Monica Ali
- Language: English
- Genre: Thriller; Mystery fiction
- Publisher: Doubleday (UK); Scribner (US)
- Publication date: 2009
- Publication place: United Kingdom
- Media type: Print (hardback and paperback), e-book, audiobook
- Pages: 432
- ISBN: 9780385614573

In the Kitchen is a novel by Monica Ali, first published in 2009. The novel follows Gabriel Lightfoot, an executive chef in a hotel restaurant in contemporary London.

== Synopsis ==
Gabriel Lightfoot, an ambitious man from an old northern English mill town, is an executive chef at the Imperial Hotel in London, where he must manage an unruly but talented group of immigrant cooks while aiming to please the hotel's new owners. One day, a hotel worker turns up dead in the kitchen’s basement, disturbing the delicate balance of Gabriel's life. Gabriel then meets Lena, a young immigrant with mysterious ties to the dead man, and makes a decision that changes his life.

== Reception ==
The Washington Post's Marie Arana commented that while the first half of the book "creeps along like your grandmother's knitting", once the reader reaches the midpoint: "And here, finally, begins your reward. For the next 200 pages until you reach the last sentence, you won't be able to put the book down, turn off the light. Ali hits her stride."

The New York Times' William Grimes praised the novel's commentary on the issues of race, culture and progress, noting that the "brilliant debates animate an otherwise meandering, overstuffed narrative that, for long stretches, goes nowhere in particular." The Guardian's Stephanie Merritt also commented positively on the novel's theme of national identity, but concluded that "Though Ali's prose is often beautiful and there are flashes of Brick Lane's buoyant comedy, Gabe's disintegration never quite engages the reader, who is left feeling better informed but oddly unaffected."

The Telegraph's Sukhdev Sandhu criticised the dialogue, saying: "dollops of didactic and clunky exposition are combined with lines half-inched from episodes of The Bill and passages of insipid mushiness".
