= Stan Lee's Lucky Man =

British crime drama television series

- Genre: Action thriller; Crime drama; Superhero
- Created by: Stan Lee; Neil Biswas
- Starring: James Nesbitt; Amara Karan; Sienna Guillory; Darren Boyd; Neve McIntosh; Stephen Hagan; Rupert Penry-Jones; Omid Djalili
- Opening theme: "Lucky One" by Corinne Bailey Rae
- Composers: Nick Green; Ben Bartlett
- Country of origin: United Kingdom
- Original language: English
- No. of series: 3
- No. of episodes: 28

Production
- Executive producers: Richard Fell; Gareth Neame; Anne Mensah; Stan Lee; Beverley Booker
- Producers: Phil Temple; Chris Clough; Ken Horn
- Production locations: London, England
- Running time: 45 minutes
- Production companies: Carnival Films; POW! Entertainment

Original release
- Network: Sky One
- Release: 22 January 2016 – 7 September 2018

Stan Lee's Lucky Man is a British superhero crime drama television series created by Stan Lee and Neil Biswas. The series is produced by Carnival Films and POW! Entertainment for Sky 1, which follows the story of Murder Squad detective Harry Clayton (James Nesbitt), who is granted the power to control luck.

The first series debuted on 22 January 2016, and was watched by 1.14 million viewers, making it Sky 1's most successful original drama series to date.

The series was renewed for a second season, which began filming in June 2016 and was first broadcast on 24 February 2017. On 25 August 2017, the drama was renewed for a third series of eight new episodes. Series 3 began filming September 2017 and is available only on Sky 1 and TV streaming service Now TV in the UK and Ireland which started on 20 July 2018.

== Plot ==
DI Harry Clayton is a detective in Central London's Murder Squad suffering from an addiction to gambling. Clayton becomes the recipient of an ancient bracelet: after a night spent with the mysterious Eve, he wakes up to find the bracelet on his wrist and discovers that it can give to him supernatural luck. With his gambling addiction having cost him his wife and daughter and being in debt for thousands of pounds to a casino owner, Clayton soon begins to use the bracelet to his own advantage.

== Cast ==
=== Current ===
- James Nesbitt as Harry Clayton; a Detective Inspector working for the Central London Murder Squad
- Sienna Guillory as Eve Alexandri; a mysterious woman who gifts the bracelet to Clayton
- Amara Karan as Suri Chohan; a Detective Inspector (formerly Sergeant), who is Clayton's protégé and partner
- Darren Boyd as Steve Orwell; a Detective Sergeant (formerly Inspector), who initially believes that Clayton is corrupt
- Stephen Hagan as Rich Clayton; Harry's half-brother and owner of an antiques warehouse
- Omid Djalili as Kalim; an associate of Clayton's and owner of a London strip club (Series 1 and 3)
- Neve McIntosh as Elizabeth Gray; Detective Superintendent and head of the Murder Squad (Series 3)
- Rupert Penry-Jones as Samuel Blake; a mysterious businessman with connections to triad gangs (Series 3)

=== Former ===
- Eve Best as Anna Clayton; Clayton's estranged wife and a criminal barrister (Series 1–2)
- Steven Mackintosh as Alistair Winter; Detective Superintendent and former head of the Murder Squad (Series 1–2)
- Thekla Reuten as Isabella Augustine; the owner of a bracelet identical to Harry's (Series 2)
- Leilah de Meza as Daisy Clayton; Harry and Anna's teenage daughter (Series 1-2, guest Series 3)
- Sendhil Ramamurthy as Nikhail Julian; a prison governor and love interest of Anna Clayton (Series 1–2)
- Jing Lusi as Lily-Anne Lau; owner of the Green Dragon Casino (Series 1–2)
- Jonathan Kerrigan as Jonny; Anna Clayton's new boyfriend (Series 2)
- John Hopkins as Charles Collins; Golding's right-hand man (Series 1)
- Burn Gorman as Doug; police pathologist (Series 1)
- Kenneth Tsang as Freddie Lau; Lily-Anne's father (Series 1)
- Joseph Gatt as Yury Becker; a hitman hired by Golding (Series 1)

== Episodes ==
=== Series overview ===
Series	Episodes	Originally released	
Series	Episodes	First released	Last released
1	10	22 January 2016	25 March 2016
2	10	24 February 2017	28 April 2017
3	8	20 July 2018	7 September 2018

=== Series 1 (2016) ===
No. overall	No. in series	Title	Directed by	Written by	Original release date	UK viewers (millions)
1	1	"More Yang Than Yin"	Andy De Emmony	Neil Biswas	22 January 2016	1.93
As his gambling debts continue to grow, DI Harry Clayton decides to go all or nothing in an attempt to clear his debt to casino owner Freddie Lau. When he crosses paths with a mysterious young woman, Eve, he realises his fortunes are beginning to change - and suspects it may all be down to an ancient Chinese bracelet that she attached to his wrist during a night of passion. When Freddie Lau is found murdered the next morning, Harry is forced to cover up his connections to the casino. The disappearance and murder of a stripper, Kayleigh Fenchurch, leads Harry and his partner, DS Suri Chohan, to suspect that casino croupier Kevin Grey is responsible for the murders of both Fenchurch and Lau.
2	2	"Win Some, Lose Some"	Andy De Emmony	Ben Schiffer	29 January 2016	1.54
Harry realises that the powers of the bracelet cause every positive event to be balanced out by a negative in his life when Ben Grady collapses and dies. Harry's boss, DSI Alistair Winter, is suspicious of his connections to Freddie Lau and keeps a close eye on him as he continues to probe the activities of Freddie's daughter and heir, Lily-Anne Lau. Harry and Suri discover a private plane, hired by Lily-Anne, which contains a substantial amount of money - a suspected payoff to Grey for committing the murders on her behalf. Harry's brother Rich provides a lead on a passport forger, which leads him right into the path of Grey. He is shocked, however, when it transpires that his ex-wife, Anna, is Grey's barrister - and she is prepared to challenge his evidence.
3	3	"Evil Eye"	David Caffrey	Ben Schiffer & Neil Biswas	5 February 2016	1.30
Suri is given compassionate leave following the death of Ben Grady, leaving Harry to team up with DI Orwell to investigate a series of jewellery robberies in Hatton Garden. Harry suspects that the gang involved are part of a diamond smuggling ring, but when Orwell is taken prisoner, he is shocked to discover that Eve is a member of the gang. Meanwhile, Suri decides to dig deeper into the suspected fraud at Lau's casino, and is shocked to discover a connection between Harry and Lau. Anna is left reeling when Kevin Grey is found dead in custody, and suspecting that he may have been the victim of murder, sets about forging a relationship with prison governor Nikhail Julian.
4	4	"A Higher Power"	David Caffrey	Neil Biswas	12 February 2016	1.49
Harry and Suri investigate the kidnapping of a businesswoman, Kate Olsen, from her offices in Central London. When Harry discovers that she was investigating Vincent Lermontov, the previous owner of the bracelet, he is forced to try and hide the fact from Lermontov's son, Paul, all whilst trying to evade a mysterious Russian stalker who is determined to silence him. When they establish a connection with the Russian Mafia, Harry manages to save Kate, but is taken prisoner himself - only to find that Eve has been kidnapped as well. DI Orwell tries to convince DSI Winter of Harry's involvement in the murder of Freddie Lau.
5	5	"The Last Chance"	Brian Kelly	Rachel Anthony	19 February 2016	1.48
Caleb Pursey, the owner of a gambling club, is found shot dead on his own premises. The prime suspect for the killing, gambling addict Tim Larson, is identified by an eyewitness, and Harry sets about tracking him down. When Suri recognises a member of Pursey's staff, she realises that he is moonlighting at Lau's casino, and suspects he may be the link in the money laundering chain. In order to clear his debts, Harry agrees to carry out an errand for Lily-Anne. However, he uses the opportunity to steal evidence which seemingly confirms her involvement in Pursey's murder. Suri intercepts a package for Winter, which seemingly contains evidence that implicates Harry in the Lau case.
6	6	"A Twist of Fate"	Brian Kelly	James Allen & Alan Westaway	26 February 2016	1.38
A fresh mutilated corpse found in the wreckage of a demolition site leads Harry and Suri to discover that the young man, Luke Bangura, was the victim of an illegal organ trade. Harry suspects that Deputy Mayor Frierson, his former commanding officer, could be involved in the operation, having mysteriously received an organ from a donor despite being part of a rare blood group, which affects only one in 4,000 people. When Eve discovers Harry's connection to Frierson, she gets him to ask about the murder of her mother, Maria - the last case which Frierson investigated, which remains unsolved. Meanwhile, Suri puts herself in grave danger to secure a result.
7	7	"The Charm Offensive"	Jon East	Stephen Gallagher	4 March 2016	1.33
A kidnap victim is accidentally killed when the police tase him, unaware he is covered in petrol. Whilst in hospital, the victim whispers 'Golding' as his final word to Harry moments before he dies. As Harry and Suri begin to dig into the victim's private life, they uncover a scam in which he and his business partner were conning foreign students into false relationships in order to steal their credit cards. When one of the victims of the scam is kidnapped at gunpoint, Harry realises it is a race against time to save her - and to stop his prime suspect from getting away. Meanwhile, despite pressure from his bosses, Winter refuses to sack Harry, as evidence of Frierson's corruption continues to grow.
8	8	"My Brother's Keeper"	Jon East	Ben Schiffer	11 March 2016	1.46
When his brother, Rich, is implicated in the murder of his girlfriend, Babs, Harry realises that Golding has set him up and sets out to prove it. With Suri now convinced that Harry is acting on the wrong side of the law, she presents Winter with the CCTV of Harry winning a double maximum bet at Freddy Lau's casino on the night of Lau's murder. After discovering an additional set of prints at the scene of Babs' murder, Harry suspects that Golding is in fact Charles Collins, a former MI6 officer currently working for the government. But as he sets out to confront Collins, Eve is kidnapped, and Winter has authorised a warrant to search Harry's flat - where Suri finds a severed head in the freezer.
9	9	"The House Always Wins"	David Caffrey	Rachel Anthony	18 March 2016	1.41
Harry is hauled in for questioning on suspicion of Yuri Becker's murder, but is unable to provide evidence that proves his version of events. Despite handing over evidence which suggests his brother could be innocent of Babs' murder, Harry isn't able to prevent his own incarceration in HM Prison Whitecross. Orwell suppresses the results of DNA evidence which proves Harry's theory, leading to a confrontation with Winter. As Winter receives word that Frierson was the recipient of Luke Bangura's kidney, he begins to realise that Harry could have been right all along. Harry, meanwhile, comes under the mercy of his fellow inmates, but his fear turns to shock when he discovers Golding's true identity - Whitecross warden Nikhail Julian.
10	10	"Leap of Faith"	David Caffrey	Neil Biswas	25 March 2016	1.47
Harry is forced to break out of Whitecross, realizing that Golding's campaign of terror to possess his bracelet will put Anna and Daisy in grave danger. Meanwhile, in a failed attempt to prevent Harry's imminent release, Orwell decides to bury evidence which seemingly confirms his innocence. As Anna and Daisy are led into a trap, Suri and Orwell are sent on a wild goose chase across London looking for the elusive Harry. When he finally manages to track down Golding, Harry realises that he has only one option to save his family: believe in the bracelet. But with time running out, and the lives of his friends and family at stake, has the bracelet finally met its match?

=== Series 2 (2017) ===
No. overall	No. in series	Title	Directed by	Written by	Original release date	UK viewers (millions)
11	1	"Luck Be a Lady"	Marek Losey	Tom Grieves	24 February 2017	0.98
Six months on from the escape of Golding, Harry and Suri are on the trail of a serial poisoner who has been randomly attacking victims across London. None of the victims appears to be connected, until Suri discovers that all either lived or worked in the Brick Lane area in the past five years. As Harry presses the locals for information, he finds himself on the trail of a suspect who leads him into one of his old gambling haunts. Although he fails to catch his man, one woman catches his eye - a woman named Isabella wearing a bracelet identical to his. Meanwhile, Winter returns to work following the shooting, and an IPCC investigation into Orwell's conduct leads him to be demoted to a DC. His day goes from bad to worse when a sting operation to catch the suspected poisoner goes horribly wrong, and seven police officers - including himself - are poisoned by the killer.
12	2	"Playing with Fire"	Marek Losey	Matt Jones	3 March 2017	0.67
Harry and Suri investigate the murder of the fiancé of one of their fellow officers in a suspected hate crime. After discovering the victim was a prominent member of a local church congregation, Harry's suspicions are drawn towards the reverend Anthony Huxley, a former doctor whom he discovers was struck off for the mistreatment of gay and lesbian patients. As Huxley begins to get underneath his skin, Harry is forced to turn to the bracelet for help. When a second victim, also a member of Huxley's congregation, is later stabbed in similar circumstances, Harry decides to gamble against Winter's orders. However, CCTV footage, initially viewed by Orwell, suggests an alternative link between the two victims. As the alluring Isabella continues to test Harry's willpower, Anna and Daisy are given police protection after a suspected sighting of Golding in London.
13	3	"Double Bluff"	Andy Hay	Tom Grieves	10 March 2017	0.73
The autopsy of a man who died from heart failure reveals that he ate human flesh before he died. Harry and Suri are led to a pie stall, where the proprietor claims that she purchased the meat from a butcher at Smithfield Market. Harry is alarmed when CCTV footage shows Golding kidnapping Eve. Golding's threat to Harry's family means Winter must take Harry off the case, and assigns him to investigate the murderous butcher. When he discovers the two cases are linked, Harry realises that the net around Golding's operation is tightening. Isabella tells Harry that Eve is the source of her bracelet and that her two little girls are dead because of Eve. Golding asks Isabella for her help tracking down Harry. She agrees but later shows that she had no intention of allowing him to kill Harry, instead allowing Eve to beat up Golding and Harry to arrest the criminal.
14	4	"The Trojan Horse"	Andy Hay	Lucy Catherine	17 March 2017	0.88
The suspicious death of a victim inside a driverless car leads Harry and Suri to investigate her less than ambiguous husband, and the operators of the technology company responsible for the creation of the vehicle. When the victim's husband later dies after falling through a top floor window, Harry and the team are drawn back to Rachel Spikes, chief technological expert and creator, and once again, he takes a gamble to secure her arrest. Meanwhile, Eve tries to convince Harry of Isabella's deception, but surprised by the beauty of his brother's new beau, Rich encourages Harry to pursue the relationship. Orwell asks Winter for a transfer after being constantly belittled by Harry.
15	5	"What Lies Beneath"	Daniel O'Hara	DC Jackson	24 March 2017	0.64
Victims are being anaesthetized and dumped in London's canals to drown. When the victims are linked through the transplant register and the theft of an anaesthetic from a local private clinic, Harry suspects that the killer could be a clinic nurse fired for being a drug addict. The nurse is found dead in her flat, from a self-inflicted overdose weeks earlier. When Harry notifies her sister, she anaesthetizes him - having murdered the others for wasting their organ transplants by continuing their own food/smoke/drink addictions. She dumps Harry into a canal, causing Isabella to "luck" Orwell into finding and saving him. Eve threatens Isabella's driver into admitting she uses her bracelet to kill many people, sending a video of the confession to Harry. Daisy sees an online video of her father running through high-speed traffic, so he finally admits his bracelet is magic.
16	6	"The Point of No Return"	Daniel O'Hara	Tom De Ville	31 March 2017	0.73
Harry's crew investigates when a hitman kills nine people at London City Airport. They focus on a victim who just returned from Macau. Looking for one of his two travelling companions leads to a stolen panel from Triptych, May–June 1973, a €30 million tri-panel. Harry learns that the hitman is Jurgen Bloch, a prolific killer with many collateral victims—including Isabella's children. Bloch kills a second thief, so Harry's crew rushes to find the third, arriving too late, though Bloch shoots Orwell (in the vest) and escapes. Isabella guides Harry to Bloch, where he convinces her to not murder Bloch "again" (she thought she had 8 years before). She relents, but her bracelet results in Bloch accidentally killing himself. Harry finally agrees with Eve that her former childhood friend uses her bracelet to kill. Daisy decides to be her father's superhero helper.
17	7	"Second Chance"	Jamie Childs	Tom Grieves	7 April 2017	0.86
Harry tells Isabella that her ongoing murder-by-bracelet campaign has finished their relationship. Evidence links casino owner Lily-Anne Lau to a murder, but Orwell comes under suspicion when the forensic evidence vanishes. Harry finds an eyewitness to the murder, but Lau has the witness killed. When Anna visits Isabella with questions about the two bracelets, Isabella proves her powers by repeatedly playing Russian Roulette, adding a bullet each time. When Orwell convinces Harry that he is being framed, Harry figures out that the lead crime scene investigator (SOCO) is being blackmailed by Lau. The SOCO helps Harry, and they get Lau on tape ordering the SOCO's murder. Harry sees Isabella dating Winter.
18	8	"The Fallen Angel"	Jamie Childs	Matt Jones	14 April 2017	0.73
Isabella is using her relationship with Winter to secretly access his files, then bracelet-murders various police suspects. Harry is arresting a killer, who is explaining how he had acted in self-defence, when Isabella causes a deadly accident. Harry and Eve stage the scene to look like murder and plant blood in Isabella's flat. Isabella is arrested but lucky evidence proves her innocence. When Rich takes Harry's place at a dinner with Suri, the two end up in bed. Anna now fully accepts Harry's bracelet and they reunite. They are driving to dinner when Isabella makes it rain, causes his brakes to fail so that he hits a power line, then electrocutes him when he steps out. Eve "feels" the incident and arrives to find Harry Clayton is dead.
19	9	"Lamb to the Slaughter"	Andy Hay	Mika Watkins	21 April 2017	0.76
Eve takes the bracelet from Harry's body, but is soon attacked by a brutal mugger, who ends up with the bracelet on his wrist. The mugger is Jay Tate, a low rate MMA fighter who now finds success. Harry is revived in hospital, soon joining Eve to deal with Jay. Jay is a jerk who won't listen to their warnings about the bracelet balancing luck, until his younger brother dies from a brain aneurysm. When Eve explains that the bracelet is his for life, Jay kills himself. Winter grows suspicious of Isabella regarding Harry's incident (she does not know Harry is alive) and lays a trap to test her. When she falls for it, Winter warns her that she can face punishment, so she bracelet-murders him. His body is found by Harry, Suri and Orwell.
20	10	"A Hero of Our Time"	Andy Hay	Tom Grieves	28 April 2017	0.86
Isabella continues lashing out. She kidnaps Rich and ties him to a pier in the Thames, where the incoming tide can drown him. She is arrested by Suri, but she "allowed" this so her cellphone could be confiscated, which causes a massive explosion meant to kill Harry. Harry, after separate discussions with Anna and Eve, has re-donned the bracelet, which leads him to Rich and thereby miss the explosion. Harry sends Rich, Anna and Daisy out of London and out of his life—to protect them from his bracelet. He accepts a gun from Eve and attracts Isabella to the roof of his damaged and vacated police station. She tearfully admits the bracelet has ruined her life, fears that his life will be ruined too, and pulls the trigger of the gun that he can't bring himself to fire. She proclaims "I love you" with her final breath. In the post-credits scene, Eve begins to throw Isabella's bracelet into the Thames. We never see her complete that action.

=== Series 3 (2018) ===
Harry learns that the Torch are a benevolent triad that has been watching over the bracelets for centuries. Along with managing the bracelets, Torch have the original hammer used to create them. Harry also runs across the Wu Chi triad, a deadly gang that is intent on destroying the bracelets, believing they are an abomination. Samuel Blake, an operative with MI6, is the adopted son of the leader of the Wu Chi, using his double connections to frame Harry for the murder (rather than suicide) of Isabella Augustine. With Harry's access to his own support group of police and family now limited, Blake works to retrieve Harry's bracelet.

No. overall	No. in series	Title	Directed by	Written by	Original release date	UK viewers (millions)
21	1	"Facing Your Demons"	Andy Hay	Tom de Ville	20 July 2018	0.40
22	2	"Run Rabbit Run"	Justin Molotnikov	Catherine Tregenna	27 July 2018	0.55
23	3	"The Zero Option"	Justin Molotnikov	Stephen Brady	3 August 2018	0.59
24	4	"Missing Persons"	Louise Hooper	Tom Grieves	10 August 2018	0.66
25	5	"The Sins of the Father"	Philip John	Catherine Treganna	17 August 2018	N/A
26	6	"The Art of War"	Philip John	Stephen Brady	24 August 2018	N/A
27	7	"Blinded by The Light"	Philip John	Stephen Brady	31 August 2018	N/A
28	8	"End of Days"	Philip John	Stephen Brady	7 September 2018	N/A

== Production ==
The concept for the series began as Stan Lee's answer to fans' questions about what super power he would like to have: luck. After starting up POW!, he and his team considered making a TV series based on such a super power. Neil Biswas then took Lee's original idea and wrote the pilot episode, developing the central character and the world around him. With the help of his writing team, Biswas developed the mythology for the first series: Stan Lee's original idea of a lucky charm that is given to a compulsive gambler became an ancient bracelet that Harry Clayton wakes up with on his wrist after a night spent with the mysterious Eve. With his gambling addiction having cost him his wife and daughter, and being in debt for thousands of pounds to a casino owner, Clayton soon begins to use the bracelet to his own advantage.

The series is executive produced by Richard Fell and Gareth Neame, with Stan Lee (who has one cameo per season) and Gill Champion serving as co-executive producers. Neil Biswas, who was the lead writer of the first season, also co-executive produced and was credited as co-creator of the show. As of October 2021, there have been no official announcements on a fourth season.
