= Shani (singer) =

American singer-songwriter

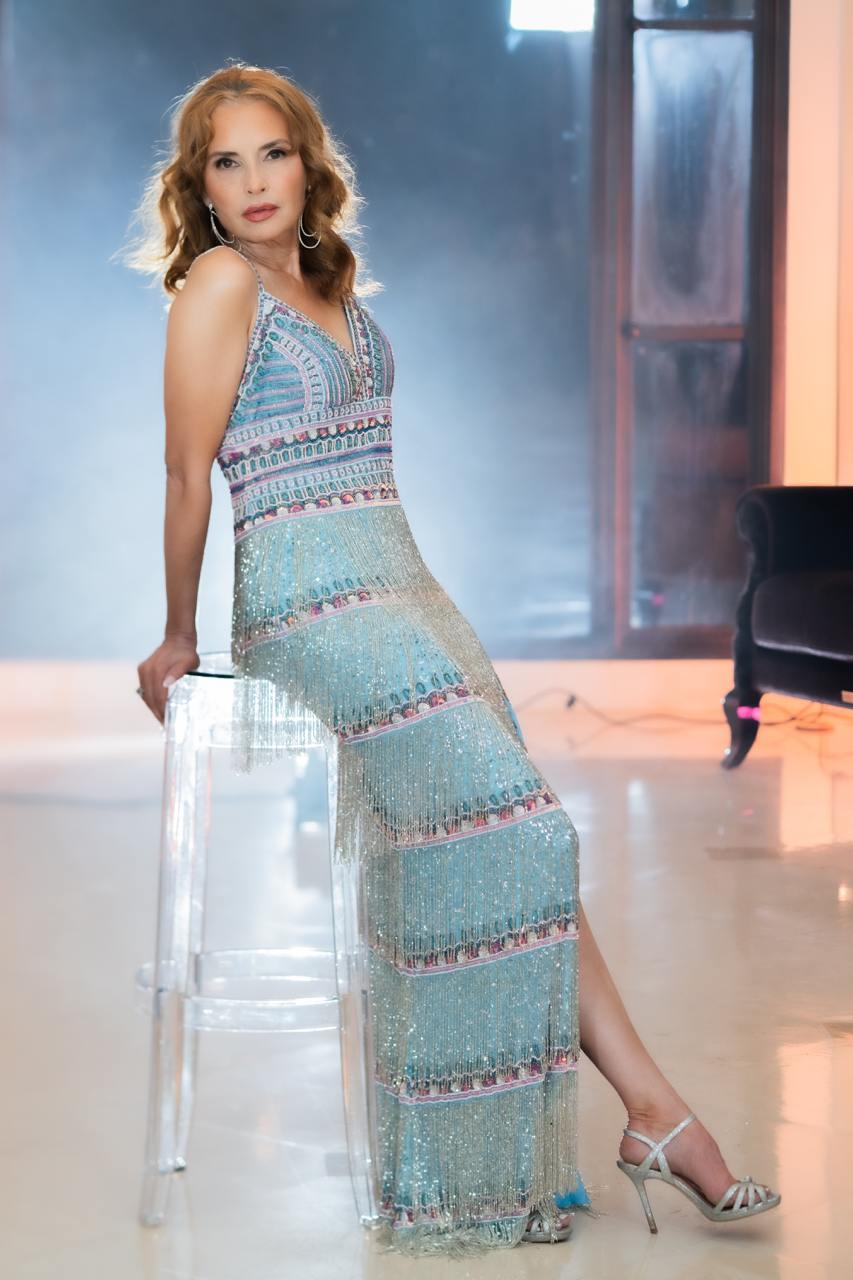

Background information
- Born: Shani Rigsbee
- Genres: Dance-pop
- Occupations: Singer, songwriter, actress
- Labels: Cherokee Music Group
- Spouse: Andranik Madadian
- Website: shanimusic.com

Shani Rigsbee, known mononymously as Shani, is an American singer-songwriter, producer, and actress who is known for her support for humanitarian causes. In 2007, she released At The Casbah, an album based on the One Thousand and One Nights collection of stories. Rigsbee and the Iranian pop star Andranik Madadian toured internationally for many years, and they have performed benefits for various charitable organizations. They sang for the Dalai Lama in 2014. Rigsbee and Madadian were married in 2011.

Rigsbee's most recent film appearance was in Dark Asset, where she worked as an actress, vocalist, composer, and producer. Her most recent album, The Moon Knows, was released in 2024 and features "Upside", the theme song from Dark Asset, as well as the single "Oh My".

She has also written and performed theme songs and featured music for several feature films. Her work includes contributions to the film Crash (2004), One Night with the King(2006), American Wrestler: The Wizard (2016), American Fighter (2019), The Keeper: The Legend of Omar Khayyam (2005), and Dark Asset (2023), among others.

== Discography ==
=== Studio albums ===
Year	Album	Notes
1999	Undercurrent	
2001	Call of the Wild	Features "El Llamar de Pasión"
2004	Velvet	
2005	At the Casbah	
2024	The Moon Knows	Includes "Oh My" and "Upside"

=== Singles ===
Year	Title	Notes
2004	"El Llamar de Pasión"	Featured in Crash
2014	"We Hear Your Voice"	
2016	"Changing Tides"	
2024	"Oh My"	From The Moon Knows
2024	"Upside"	Theme song for Dark Asset

== Filmography ==
=== Film ===
Year	Title	Role	Notes
1996	Crossworlds	Dancer	
2003	House of Sand and Fog	Wedding Singer	Also music department
2003	Irangeles	Shani	Also music supervisor
2005	The Keeper: The Legend of Omar Khayyam	Court Entertainer	
2014	Shirin in Love	Shani	
2014	Guardian Angel	Detective Keller	Also co-executive producer
2023	Dark Asset	Agent Wilds	Also producer

=== Television ===
Year	Title	Role	Notes
1986	Silver Spoons	Jodi	1 episode

=== As composer/soundtrack ===
Year	Title	Role	Notes
1997	Strays	Performer, Composer	"Come to You"
2003	House of Sand and Fog	Featured vocalist	Song music
2004	Crash	Performer	"El Llamar de Pasión"
2005	The Keeper: The Legend of Omar Khayyam	Performer	Soundtrack executive producer
2006	One Night with the King	Featured vocalist	
2006	National Lampoon's Pledge This!	Performer, Composer	"Invasive"
2006	G.I. Jesus	Composer, Performer	
2006	Sleeper Cell	Writer	TV series
2014	Guardian Angel	Performer, Composer	Theme song "Far and Away"
2016	American Wrestler: The Wizard	Lyrics, Performer	"Rise" (with Andy Madadian)
2019	American Fighter	Writer	Theme song "The Good Fight"
2023	Dark Asset	Performer	Theme song "Upside"
