= Holly Kenny =

English actress (born 1995)

Holly Kenny (born 23 January 1995 in Leeds, England) is an English actress. She played the role of Sambuca Kelly on the BBC One school-based drama series Waterloo Road from 2009 until her character was killed off in 2011.

== Career ==
Kenny first appeared in Waterloo Road on the first episode of the fourth series, broadcast on 7 January 2009. Her final episode was in its seventh series, broadcast on 8 June 2011, when Sambuca was killed off after suffering with a long-term brain tumour.

She played Kimberley Crabtree in the British comedy television film Mischief Night (2006). She has also starred in the BAFTA award-winning BBC film White Girl (2008) as Leah.

== Filmography ==
Year	Film	Role	Notes	Refs.
2006	Mischief Night	Kimberley Crabtree	Film	
2008	White Girl	Leah	Television film	
2009–2011	Waterloo Road	Sambuca Kelly	Regular role (series 4–7); 55 episodes	
2009	Doctors	Bella Moody	Episode: "No Rest for the Wicked"	
2012	Shameless	Alice	Episode: "What Are Friends For?"	
2014	The Mill	Patience	Main role; 6 episodes	
2014	In the Club	Britney	Episode: "Roanna"	
