= Mischief Night (2006 film) =

2006 film by Penny Woolcock

- Directed by: Penny Woolcock
- Written by: Penny Woolcock
- Produced by: Abi Bach; Willow Grylls
- Starring: Kelli Hollis; Ramon Tikaram; Qasim Akhtar; Holly Kenny
- Narrated by: Kelli Hollis
- Cinematography: Robbie Ryan
- Edited by: Michael Parker
- Music by: Murray Gold; Nihal Arthanyake; Bobby Friction
- Production company: Company Pictures
- Distributed by: Film4
- Release date: 3 November 2006
- Running time: 92 minutes
- Country: United Kingdom
- Language: English
- Budget: $1 million

Mischief Night is a 2006 British comedy-drama film. It is the third installment of the Tina Trilogy following on from Tina Goes Shopping (1999) and Tina Takes a Break (2001). However, unlike the previous two Channel 4 films Mischief Night broadens its scope to consider the wider community that Tina lives in and address issues of racial segregation. Kelli Hollis plays Tina in all three films.

== Synopsis ==
The film is set on a deprived Leeds estate where Asian and white residents have been segregated. Tensions between the two communities come to a head on the unruly Mischief Night. The film shows several people's involvement in this.

== Characters ==
- Asif – A young Asian boy of about ten or eleven. Although to his parents he is an innocent young Asian lad, Asif is a tearaway when he is away from home. Asif's involvement begins when he steals a car and crashes into Qassim. Qassim is a thug and drug dealer in the Asian community and after beating him demands that Asif pay him back for the damage to his car. Asif is forced to work for Qassim, delivering drugs and collecting payments in order to pay off his debts. Whilst doing this he befriends Kimberley and helps her search for her real father. After crashing a taxi owned by Qassim, Asif decides that his only way out is to kill Qassim. Asif and Kimberley acquire a gun and stake out the house with the intention of killing Qassim. Kimberley fires the shot but Qassim survives.
- Kimberley – A young girl of about ten or eleven who sets out to discover who her real father is. While out she meets Asif and the two of them become friends. Kimberley agrees to help Asif kill Qassim. The two of them stake out his house with the intention of shooting him through the window. Their noise, however, lures him outside. Kimberley then shoots him in the chest, just as her mother (Tina) runs up to her, telling her that Qassim is her father. Qassim survives the shot.
- Tyler – After stealing a safe from a golf club, Tyler turns to his granddad to help him open it. With others the two of them take it to a field and blow the safe apart, finding it to contain only golf balls. Tyler then joins his granddad in routing out rival dealers on the estate. Tyler tires of simply being a messenger and look-out, acquires a gun and intends to go it alone, dealing drugs on the estate. Tyler manages this with some success. On his rounds, Tyler comes across Jane, an unemployed single mother with a chronic heroin addiction. After finding her baby on the floor, dirty and attempting to drink bleach, Tyler offers to take the baby out, much to the indifference of her mother. This becomes a habit and Tyler becomes the sole parent figure to the baby.
- Eye Patch Imam – A radicalized Muslim, who preaches hate and advocates terrorism in the local mosque. Tina describes him when he was young to be a pervert with little interest in religion, stating that he 'used to have use of two eyes and would use them both to look up your skirt'. After beating children for their disinterest in the mosque, Imam loses the support of more liberal Muslims. Finding himself alienated he attempts to break into the mosque with supporters of his, take it by force, change the locks and keep the mosque for more fundamentalist teachings.
- Immie – A liberal Muslim, brother to Asif and former associate of Qassim. Immie is also a friend of Tina. Immie becomes concerned about rising radicalization in the mosque and uses the powerful, ruthless figure of Qassim to prevent the coup planned by Eye Patch Imam.

== Cast ==
- Kelli Hollis as Tina Crabtree
- Ramon Tikaram as Immie Khan
- Qasim Akhtar as Asif Khan
- Holly Kenny as Kimberley Crabtree
- Michael Taylor as Tyler Crabtree
- Christopher Simpson as Qassim
- Gwyn Hollis as Don
- Harmage Singh Kalirai as Mr. Khan
- Shobu Kapoor as Mrs. Khan
- Sarah Byrne as Sarina Khan
- James Foster as Kev
- Shahid Ahmed as Eyepatch Imam
- Jake Hayward as Macauley Crabtree
- Katherine Kelly as Jane

== Filming locations ==
The film was set made around several different areas of Leeds, however primarily the 'Asian' area of Leeds was filmed around Beeston while the 'White' area was mainly filmed around Hunslet and Tingley. Scenes were also filmed in Belle Isle and Middleton. One scene where tram pylons were required had to be filmed in Sheffield.
