= White Girl (2008 film) =

2008 film by Hettie MacDonald

- Written by: Abi Morgan
- Directed by: Hettie MacDonald
- Starring: Anna Maxwell Martin; Holly Kenny; Daniel Mays; Melanie Hill; Jay Simpson; Jade Islam
- Music by: Nina Humpherys
- Country of origin: United Kingdom
- Original language: English

Production
- Executive producer: Greg Brenman
- Producer: Andrew Woodhead
- Production company: Tiger Aspect Productions

Original release
- Network: BBC Two
- Release: 10 March 2008

White Girl is a 2008 BBC film directed by Hettie MacDonald and starring Anna Maxwell Martin, Holly Kenny, Daniel Mays, Melanie Hill, Jay Simpson, and Jade Islam. Written by Abi Morgan, it was made as part of the BBC's White Season. It portrays a white family who move from an area of Leeds that has predominantly White British inhabitants to an area of Bradford composed of inhabitants of South Asian heritage.

== Plot ==
Debbie, a working class single mother from Leeds, moves her family to Bradford, where they find themselves in an ethnic minority. Daughter Leah must adapt to being the only white girl at school.

== Cast ==
- Anna Maxwell Martin – Debbie
- Holly Kenny – Leah
- Daniel Mays – Stevie
- Melanie Hill – Sonya
- Jay Simpson – Adam
- Elise and Gabrielle Johnson – Casey
- Jade Islam – Yasmin

== Awards ==
- British Academy Television Awards 2009 – Best Single Drama
