= Second Generation (film) =

- US DVD poster
- Genre: Drama
- Written by: Neil Biswas
- Directed by: Jon Sen
- Starring: Parminder Nagra; Christopher Simpson; Danny Dyer
- Theme music composer: Nitin Sawhney
- Country of origin: United Kingdom
- Original languages: English; Bengali
- No. of episodes: 2

Production
- Producer: Catherine Wearing
- Cinematography: Sean Bobbitt
- Editor: Dave King
- Running time: 136 minutes
- Production company: The Oxford Film Company
- Budget: £2.5 million

Original release
- Network: Channel 4
- Release: 14 September – 15 September 2003

Second Generation is a 2003 British two-part television romantic drama directed by Jon Sen, written by Neil Biswas, and stars Parminder Nagra, Christopher Simpson and Danny Dyer.

Inspired by the Jacobean tragedy King Lear by William Shakespeare, the drama revolves around two childhood sweet-hearts who find the passion is still there when their paths cross. It was broadcast by Channel 4 over two consecutive days on 14 September 2003 and 15 September 2003.

== Plot ==
=== Part One ===
Estranged from her family for nine years, feisty, independent Heere (Parminder Nagra) is living with her white, music journalist fiancé, Jack (Danny Dyer). When her father, Sharma (Om Puri), falls into a coma, her older sisters, Pria (Rita Wolf) and Rina (Amita Dhiri), get back in touch.

Meanwhile, Sam is recruiting Uzi (Sonnell Dadral) for his underground record label, Monsoon. Sharma's friend and employee, Khan (Anupam Kher), (who is also Sam's father) intends on stopping the conniving Pria from selling Sharma's food factory, even though Mohan (Roshan Seth) warns Khan not to get involved and thinks it is justice for Sharma swindling them out of their share of the business. Jack and Heere go to Club 23 nightclub, where Heere meets Sam after years apart. They go back to his flat and embrace, but she regrets the encounter and leaves. Sharma wakes up on the day his daughters were set to turn off his life support machine. Sam continues his attempts to pursue Heere.

Heere attends Sharma's puja with Jack where she is disowned by Sharma. Heere turns up with a friend at a meeting Sam is having with Jack. After Sam tells his elder brother, Firoz (Nitin Ganatra), that he has met Heere, and Firoz passes this along to Rina, Pria then tells Heere that there is a rumour that Heere and Sam are having a sexual relationship. Heere confronts Sam and they end up having sexual intercourse.

Sharma returns to work and sacks Khan after Khan reveals that Pria planned to sell the factory. Sam tells Khan (to Khan's dismay), that he wants to marry Heere. Firoz sides with the Sharmas and resents Khan for selling the factory. Khan then finds out Firoz and Rina are having an affair. After Heere rejects Sam, Sam ignores Khan's phone call and message and starts a sexual relationship with his colleague, Amba (Shelley Conn). The next morning Sam finds Khan after he has hanged himself.

=== Part Two ===
Sam and Firoz attend Khan's janazah (funeral prayer). During Khan's wake, Heere's attempts to console Sam fall on deaf ears. A drunk Mohan tells Sharma the truth about Khan and Sharma's daughters. Sharma realises the truth and gives his employees paid leave until the problems are sorted out.

Sam goes to work to find that Jez (Jay Simpson) and Paul (William Beck), from the non-independent label Zenon, are pitching a deal for Uzi to his business partner, Parv (Chris Ryman). Sam fears that they want to buy out Uzi, and turn Monsoon from a community-based label into a commercial product. This distresses Sam because he thinks artistic development is more important than money.

Meanwhile, Pria, Rina, and Firoz have Sharma sectioned with the help of Rina's GP husband, Arun (Shiv Grewal). Heere visits Sharma, who mistakes her for her mother, Sonali. Jack refuses Heere's request for Sharma to move in with them. Sam reluctantly signs a takeover deal for Monsoon to join Zenon. At the celebration boat party, Heere rejects Uzi's advances; and Jack suspects Sam and Heere are having sex, leading to a fight with Sam. Meanwhile, Rina plans on leaving Arun for Firoz.

Heere brings Sharma to her house, where he breaks down. Out of guilt, Firoz breaks up with Rina. Pria reveals to Heere that she found their mother after she committed suicide and resents their father for abandoning their mother. Heere's application to be Sharma's carer fails and she reconciles with her sisters.

Pria sells the factory and Firoz is made the managing director. Heere ends her relationship with Jack, goes to Club 23, tells Sam how she feels about him and that she is leaving for India, and with Mohan's help smuggles Sharma out of the care home onto a flight to India. Sam apologises to Amba, gives Parv sole ownership of Monsoon and leaves the nightclub.

Sam meets Heere and Sharma in Calcutta. Sam and Heere rekindle their romantic relationship.

== Cast ==
- Parminder Nagra as Heere Sharma/Sonali Sharma
- Christopher Simpson as Sam Khan
- Danny Dyer as Jack Woodford
- Om Puri as Sharma
- Anupam Kher as Khan
- Rita Wolf as Pria Sharma
- Amita Dhiri as Rina Chatterjee
- Radhika Aggarwal as DJ Sita
- Nitin Ganatra as Firoz Khan
- Shelley Conn as Amba
- Chris Ryman as Parv
- Roshan Seth as Mohan
- Shiv Grewal as Arun Chatterjee
- Sonnell Dadral as Uzi

== Overview ==
Set in east London and Calcutta, Second Generation tells the story tangled relationships of two Indian Bengali families, who emigrated to Britain in the 1970s. The families have a deep-rooted, shared history, one factory-owning Hindu suburbanites, the other put-upon Muslims from Whitechapel. When Heere meets Sam, the passion is still there - and with it comes trouble. In flight from the past, in turmoil about the future. Sam and Heere need to work out what they want - and where they belong.

== Production ==
The two-part £2.5 million drama was a cornerstone of Channel 4's efforts to emphasise that it is conscious of and in tune with ethnic minorities in the UK.

It was the first drama to be produced by Oxford Film and Television. It was written, directed, and almost exclusively acted by Asians. Nitin Sawhney composed the soundtrack, for which he was nominated for the Ivor Novello Awards for Film and TV Composition.

== Release ==
Second Generation was broadcast on Channel 4 over two consecutive nights on 14 September 2003 and 15 September 2003.

On 26 July 2006, the DVD of the drama was released in the United States.

== Reception ==
Gareth McLean of The Guardian described the drama as a "sweeping and rather splendid story of love, ambition, betrayal, secrets and lies... religion. And race. And big issues of identity, belonging... so it was enormously enjoyable."

Sukhdev Sandhu of The Daily Telegraph called the drama "an epic saga that takes in madness, suicide and the agonies and ecstasies of migration." Kathryn Flett of The Observer said it was "rapturous to look at thanks to the most handsome collection of actors in living memory and some evanescent photography, it was elegantly acted... brilliantly written... one of the year's most memorable dramas."

Marie Claire thought the drama was "the sort of ambitious, edgy drama Channel 4 was made for... Romantic original and exciting." Daily Mirror thought it was "glamorous and romantic... it had all the authentic energy and passion of a contemporary My Beautiful Laundrette or Traffic." The Times said "there is a complex dramatic energy behind Second Generation and, above all, it rings true." The Daily Telegraph said it "was not only an engrossing, beautifully produced drama but also an accurate reflection of the lives and concerns of British Asians today." Ross Peter of Sunday Herald described it as "King Lear meets Romeo and Juliet in clubland."

Redhotcurry.com called the drama an "explosive story about love, family and identity." Radio Times described it as "vibrant, vivid drama full of love and betrayal." Broadcast hailed it "truly remarkable".

== Awards and nominations ==
Year	Award	Category	Recipient(s)	Result
2003	Ivor Novello Awards	Film and TV Composition	Nitin Sawhney	Nominated
2004	Ethnic Multicultural Media Awards	Best Television Actress	Parminder Nagra	Won
