= Dark Asset =

- Directed by: Michael Winnick
- Written by: Michael Winnick
- Produced by: Shani Rigsbee; Narbeh Tatoussian; Lan Kay; Ned Kisner; Sargon Yoseph
- Starring: Byron Mann; Helena Mattsson; Robert Patrick
- Music by: [10}SONGS
- Production companies: Lankis Entertainment; Cherokee Productions; Across The Board Entertainment
- Release date: September 22, 2023
- Running time: 90 minutes
- Country: United States
- Language: English
- Budget: [20M$<BUGET]COSTED]world>/widebox/office/}1,703,281,00$

Dark Asset is a 2023 American action thriller film written and directed by Michael Winnick and starring Byron Mann, Helena Mattsson and Robert Patrick. Winnick, Mann and Patrick serve as executive producers of the film.

== Plot ==
John Doe is an ex-special forces soldier being subjugated to a secret government program to be implanted with a chip to be made super human with exponentially increased mental capabilities. He is in an interrogation room doing exercises with overturned cards identifying the animal names with absolute precision being observed by Dr. Cain and assistants Vivian, Sarah and Alex. Sarah impulsively orders Dr. Cain to abort the program which enrages John to go haywire, kills two guards and smashes the observation window, attacking Dr. Cain and colleagues, apprehends a tablet, then kills many guards in the hallway and sets upon computer hacking with absolute skill and speed. He escapes, driving in a Lamborghini to an upscale hotel cabaret, meeting the striking Jane, claiming to be a dissatisfied office employee there for a business conference awaiting a friend, offering her his vehicle if she will spend the time sitting and listening to him tell his story. Sarah meets agent Marina hiding in London revealing that she was forced to be a sex slave. He reveals that he is not the first spy to be subjected to the program, that predecessor Han Wyn, was executed by Senator Benson's bodyguard after a mission gone awry. Marina, is caught trying to steal her boss Yuri's vehicle, who then relinquishes her to a colleague for pleasure.

A civilian, Bindi was recruited into the program, sent on a mission to a warehouse then to execute Mr. Titit and a flashback reveals that John had sex with Vivian and Cain told John that his chip is the most advanced upgrade. When John goes back to the agency headquarters, he finds a room full of four agents who he presumed to be dead or executed who awake and engage him in full on combat. John uses the tablet to plug into the agency system to activate all other chip program agent adherents, "to send them a suggestion". John activates Ylan to send him after Yuri Ketrov, executing him at his vineyard. Jane then asks how, if John has the most advances chip, how is he meeting her and John asks that he will go to the reveal if she takes him back to her place. John meets fellow agent Sarah at a bar to discover that the chip is more troublesome than beneficial, that removing it would be fatal, the chip does more than expected and she is on the run due to a change in leadership. John reveals to Jane that she is not, in fact there for a conference but to meet Senator Benson who she assassinated along with his bodyguard, which she denies. John reveals that the chip has a kill switch built in to cause memory loss, the room of the four agents had an empty table labeled Jane Doe and that the woman that Jane is actually Sarah. Jane goes to the washroom and meets Vivian who gives her a taser claiming that it will fry John's chip and she experiences the same shaking hand symptoms of chip implanted agents.

A flashback has John meeting Sarah who gives him his Lamborghini that he claims to Jane that is actually hers and was stolen. Sarah asks where the tablet is and John says he gave it to Sarah. Ylan, Marina and other agents are lying fast asleep. Jane asks John if he will pay the bill and he claims to be broke, then Vivian and Alex appear with a hit team claiming that they cracked John's codes and implemented fresh codes to find him and John claims that he already wanted them all here, Jane punches him in the face then the hit team open fire on John who he finishes all off. Vivian has John at gunpoint, then John parries Vivian's gun and shoots Alex dead, then Jane tases John. When John is back on the table brain dead, Vivian reveals that John's chip is completely fried and asks Dr. Cain what is his purpose and he replies there's always someone with money, then he asks Jane what were his last words, Jane replies, he "wished me good luck", and Dr. Cain replies; "there's no such thing as good luck, just good planning", and Jane replies; "exactly" and kills Vivian, then Dr. Cain asks; "what are you doing?" and Jane reveals that her true purpose was to finish off the program and Dr. Cain, then Jane fires a shot.

== Cast ==
- Byron Mann as John
- Helena Mattsson as Jane
- Robert Patrick as Dr. Cain

== Production ==
In November 2021, it was announced that principal photography wrapped.

== Release ==
The film was released in theaters, VOD and On Demand on September 22, 2023.

== Reception ==
On the review aggregator website Rotten Tomatoes, 20% of 5 critics' reviews are positive, with an average rating of 3.7/10.

Salvatore Cento of MovieWeb awarded the film two stars out five, writing, "While the initial premise and promisingly dangerous introduction do indeed tease an action-packed ride synonymous with other averagely rated entries in the genre, everything Dark Asset has to offer is instead slowed down when the overall mystery of the movie is introduced." Phil Hoad of The Guardian also awarded the film two stars out of five, saying that "despite its attempts to juice up its cyborg setup with some old-fashioned body heat, Dark Asset ends up more smarmy than sexy."
