= Crossworlds =

- Directed by: Krishna Rao
- Written by: Krishna Rao; Raman Rao
- Starring: Rutger Hauer; Josh Charles; Andrea Roth; Stuart Wilson; Jack Black
- Music by: Christophe Beck
- Production company: Trimark Pictures
- Distributed by: Trimark
- Release date: February 14, 1996
- Running time: 90 minutes
- Country: United States
- Language: English

Crossworlds is a 1996 American science fiction film starring Rutger Hauer, Josh Charles, Andrea Roth, Stuart Wilson and Jack Black, and directed by Krishna Rao. The film, Rao's feature directorial debut, received mixed reviews but is remembered for its special effects as well as the presence of Hauer.

== Plot ==
College student Joe is drawn into a battle to save the world from arch-enemy Ferris. Joe's heirloom pendant just happens to be the key to a sceptre that opens doors to the Crossworlds, another dimension. When Laura shows up to check on the key and Ferris' goons begin their assaults, they run to semi-retired adventurer A.T. for help and guidance.

== Cast ==
- Rutger Hauer as Alex "A.T."
- Josh Charles as Joe "Seph" Talbot
- Stuart Wilson as Ferris
- Andrea Roth as Laura
- Perry Anzilotti as Rebo
- Richard McGregor as Stu
- Jack Black as Steve
- Ellen Geer as Joe's Mom
- Beverly Johnson as The Queen
- Tony Ervolina as Joe's Dad
- Michael Stadvec as Cop #1
- Michael Wiseman as Cop #2
- Shani Rigsbee as The Dancer

== Production ==
The film was Rao's first feature. The cast also include Jack Black in an early role.

Special effects were made by Digital Drama. The film was shot in Los Angeles, Lone Pine, and El Mirage Dry Lake, California, USA.

== Reception ==
Creature Feature gave the movie 2 out of 5 stars, finding the low budget a detriment. A review in Mad Movies also stated the films would have required more important means to achieve its ambitions. Another issue of the same magazine found the character of Joe irritating and stated: "Some new digital effects and the harsh presence of Rutger Hauer may console the last admirers of B-movies deprived of any surprising features." The production was judged "tedious more than exciting" by Howard Maxford. The film was however also described as "a fun sci fi action-fantasy with excellent FX" and as "offer[ing] adventure, fighting, fantasy and a good dose of special effects, created by the team that made possible, among other films, Batman Forever, Demolition Man and Mortal Kombat."
