= Very Present Tense =

Studio album by Christopher Simpson
- Released: 8 August 2008
- Recorded: 2008
- Genre: Blues; jazz; folk; song cycle
- Length: 17:45
- Language: English; Kinyarwanda
- Producer: Tom Havelock

Very Present Tense is the debut studio album by British actor Christopher Simpson.

== Composition ==
In 2008, whilst Simpson was artist-in-residence with creative arts group Metal, he completed the song cycle Very Present Tense. He wrote it over a number of years in response to the death of his mother. The songs which reference musical idioms, including blues, jazz, and Rwandan folk, reflecting his Rwandan and Irish family heritage. The album was developed in collaboration with composer Tom Havelock.

== Performance ==
The song cycle premiered at the arts hub in Edge Hill Station pavilion in Liverpool on 8 August 2008, during the Liverpool European Capital of Culture. He performed the work for the second time with Metal at the Village Green Festival on 29 September 2009, this time working with a group of musicians from Southend. Simpson then worked on recording the work.

== Track listing ==
No.	Title	Length
1.	"Niwowe Nakunda"	3:58
2.	"Cradle Me Now"	3:22
3.	"Oh on That Day"	3:23
4.	"Habana"	3:49
5.	"In Other Words"	3:10
Total length:		17:45
