= Neil Biswas =

British screenwriter, playwright and director

Neil Biswas (born 1971) is a British screenwriter, playwright and director best known for his non-fictional TV drama Bradford Riots, which he wrote and directed.

== Early life ==
Biswas grew up in East London and is of Indian Bengali descent. He graduated with a degree in English from Oxford University.

== Career ==
His stage-plays include Crash (Croydon Warehouse), Skirmishes (Etcetera), Overhear (National Tour – Leicester Haymarket, Bristol New Vic, Brixton Shaw) and Skin (Soho Theatre Company). He has also written for BBC Radio Four, The Royal Court YPT, English National Opera and Tara Arts.

Biswas has co-written the Talkback Productions' ten-part adaptation of In a Land of Plenty (screened on BBC2 in 2000). He also wrote the TV serials Second Generation for Channel 4 and the mini-series, The Take which ran on Sky 1, and directed two episodes of Skins. He has written an episode of the fantasy series Sinbad. He has also co-written and directed his original feature film Darkness Visible.

Biswas is the co-creator, lead writer and co-executive producer for Stan Lee's Lucky Man, which screened in January 2016.

== Personal life ==
Neil Biswas is married to Manjinder Virk. They met on the set of the TV drama Bradford riots in 2007. As of 2021, he, his wife, and two children live in Dulwich, South London.

== Filmography ==
Year	Title	Role	Notes
2019	Darkness Visible	Director	Feature
2017	Stan Lee's Lucky Man	Various	TV series (Co-creator, Lead writer & Co-executive producer)
2012	Sinbad	Various	TV series (Writer & Co-executive producer)
2010	Skins	Director	TV series (2 episodes)
2009	The Take (TV series)	Various	TV series (Writer & Co-executive producer)
2007	Forgiven	Creative script consultant	TV movie
2006	Bradford Riots	Various	TV movie (Writer & Director)
2003	Second Generation (film)	Writer	TV movie
2003	Two Minutes	Various	Short (Writer & Director)
2001	In a Land of Plenty	Writer	TV series (4 episodes)

== Awards and nominations ==
Neil Biswas received BAFTA's Break-Through Talent in 2007 for his made-for-television movie Bradford Riots.
