= En La Cocina =

En La Cocina (English: In The Kitchen) is an English language television cooking programme in the United States devoted to Latin American cuisine. It features regional chefs, restaurants, farmers and products associated with Hispanic food. It airs on KXLY and KXMN (My TV) in Spokane/CDA and on KAPP/KVEW in the Yakima Tri-Cities area. En La Cocina reaches more than 1.3 million viewers between the two markets on these four channels.
