= Untold Story (novel) =

Novel by Monica Ali

- First edition (UK)
- Author: Monica Ali
- Language: English
- Published: Doubleday (UK); Scribner's (US)
- Publication date: 2011
- Publication place: England
- Media type: Print
- Pages: 272
- ISBN: 978-1451635485 (first edition, hardcover)
- OCLC: 699767337
- Dewey Decimal: 823.92
- LC Class: PR6101.L45 U58

Untold Story is a novel by Monica Ali, her fourth book after two novels and a collection of short stories. It asks what would have happened if Diana, Princess of Wales had not died in a car accident in Paris in 1997 but had arranged for her own disappearance and tried to live an undiscovered life in a small American town. In the novel, Princess Diana is portrayed in fictional form as an English expat named Lydia. The story is told through a combination of third person narrative, diary entries of the princess's former personal secretary, Lawrence Standing, and letters written by Lydia.

In May 2011, it was reported that Ali had sold the film rights to British production company Cloud Eight Films.

Ali claimed in 2022 that one critic called it 'a curious marriage of author and subject matter'. Ali has spoken of how damaging she experienced what she saw as the stereotyping of her work to be.
