= Monica Ali =

British writer, novelist (born 1967)

Monica Ali CBE FRSL
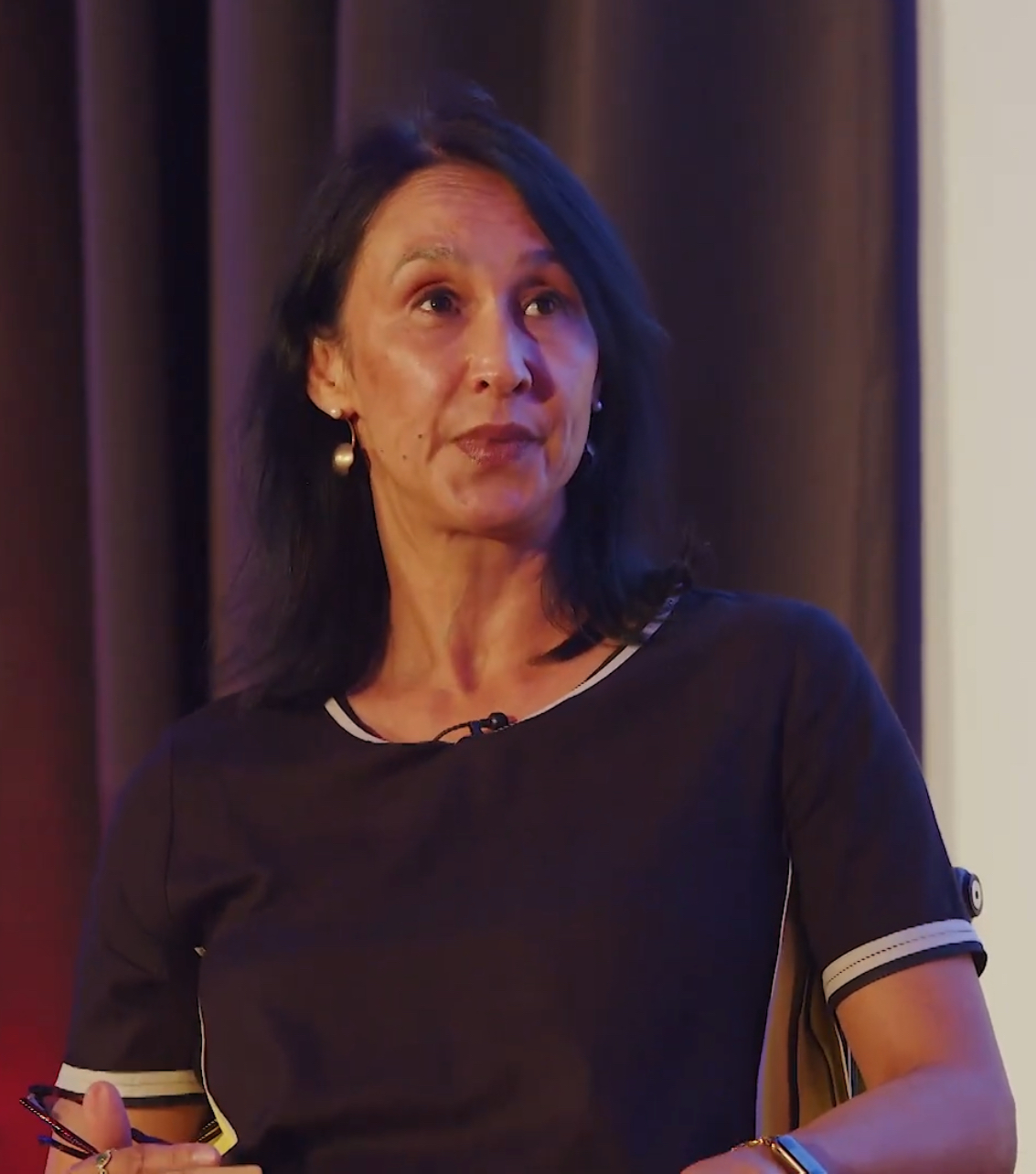
- Ali at the British Library in 2023
- Born: 20 October 1967 (age 59); Dacca, East Pakistan
- Education: Bolton School; Wadham College, Oxford
- Occupations: Writer; novelist
- Spouse: Simon Torrance
- Children: 2
- Writing career
- Notable work: Brick Lane
- Website: monicaali.com

Monica Ali CBE FRSL (Bengali: মনিকা আলী; born 20 October 1967) is a British writer of Bangladeshi and English descent. In 2003, she was selected as one of the "Best of Young British Novelists" by Granta magazine based on her unpublished manuscript; her debut novel, Brick Lane, was published later that year. It was shortlisted for the Man Booker Prize. It was adapted as a 2007 film of the same name. She has also published four other novels. Her fifth novel, Love Marriage, was published by Virago Press in February 2022 and became an instant Sunday Times bestseller.

Ali was appointed Commander of the Order of the British Empire (CBE) in the 2024 Birthday Honours for services to literature. She was elected a Fellow of the Royal Society of Literature in 2019.

== Early life and education ==
Ali was born in Dhaka, East Pakistan (now Bangladesh), in 1967 to a Bangladeshi father and an English mother. When she was three years old, her family moved to Bolton, England. Her father is originally from the district of Mymensingh. She attended Bolton School and then studied philosophy, politics and economics at Wadham College, Oxford.

== Brick Lane ==
Brick Lane, Ali's 2003 novel, takes place in London's Bangladeshi community. It follows the life of Nazneen, who moves from Bangladesh to Tower Hamlets at the age of 18 to marry an older man, Chanu. At first, Nazneen speaks only a few words of English; the novel explores her life and adapting to the community, while the narrative also follows her sister, Hasina, through her correspondence.

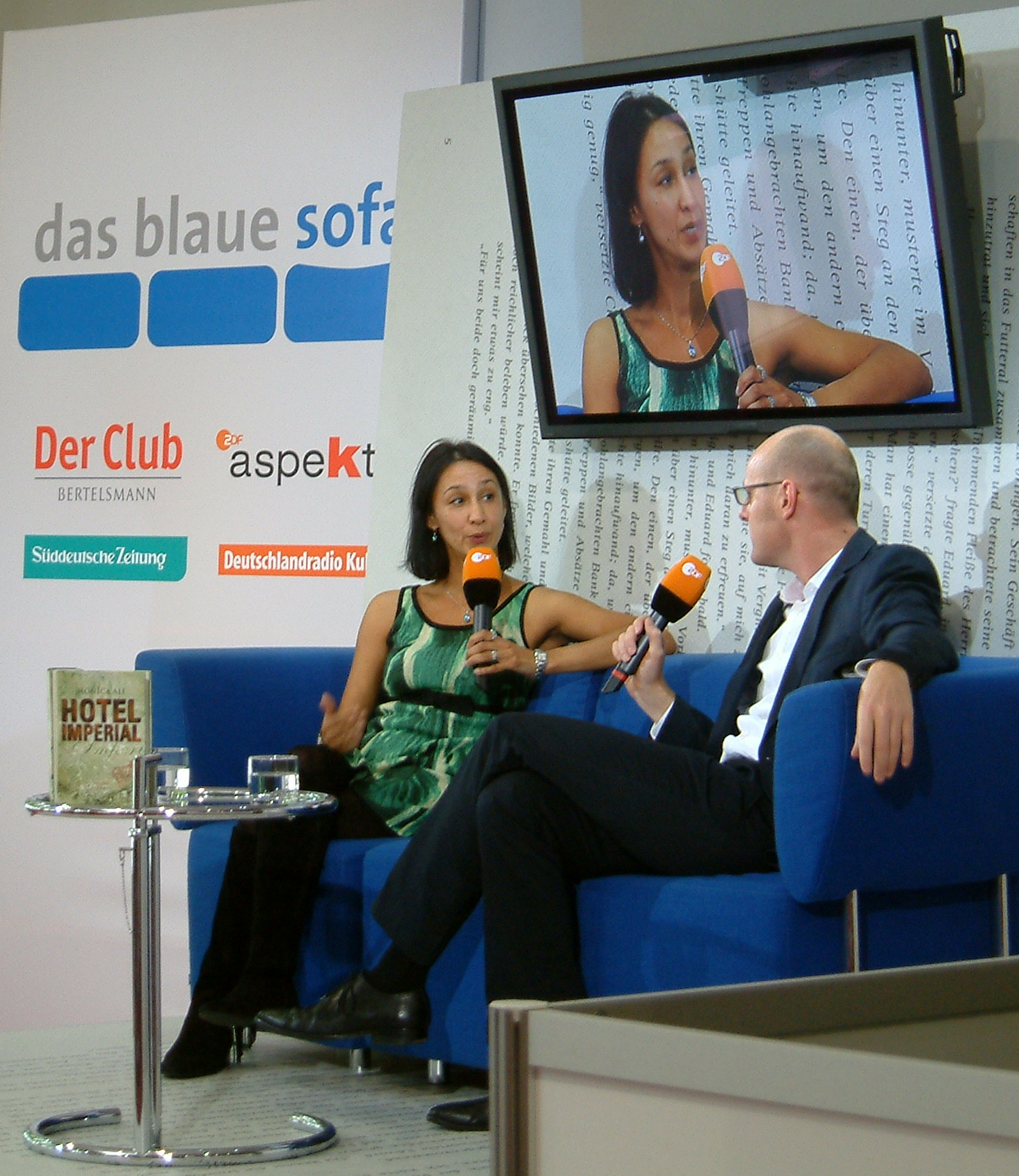
Ali in 2009

Brick Lane was generally well-received among the British press becoming a The Daily Telegraph bestseller and earning a place on the Man Booker Prize shortlist. The Observer highlighted especially the characterisation of Chanu as both exasperating and lovable. The novel was well-received by critics also in the United States.

However, the novel provoked controversy within the Bangladeshi community in Britain. Some groups thought Ali had negatively portrayed people from the Sylhet Division, as they constitute the majority of the Bangladeshi immigrants living in the Brick Lane community. Tensions escalated in 2006, when some of the Bangladeshi community opposed Ruby Films's intention to shoot parts of the film adaptation in the Brick Lane area. The Campaign Against Monica Ali's Film Brick Lane was formed, organizing demonstrations against what was seen as a negative and stereotyped portrayal of the area and the Bangladeshi community more broadly, and for ignoring the area's layered history.

The writer and activist Germaine Greer supported the campaign, writing that the novel caricatured Sylhetis of Brick Lane and reflected Ali's "lack of authenticity", as she had never spent much time in the Brick Lane community. The writer Salman Rushdie criticised Greer for her "philistine, sanctimonious, and disgraceful, but ... not unexpected" statements.

== Love Marriage ==
After a ten-year hiatus, during which Ali suffered a "loss of confidence" according to an interview in The Guardian, she returned with her fifth novel, Love Marriage. Described in The Times' culture section as a "literary love story", the book is set in London in 2016–2017, and tells the story of Yasmin Ghorami, a 26-year-old junior doctor, who is engaged to be married to fellow doctor, Joe Sangster. In the same article, journalist Rosie Kinchen argues that we are living in "a time when feelings are so fraught and people seem to be itching to taking offence", going on to say: "This is precisely why it's a good time to have her back. Nuance is one of Ali's greatest skills; she can lay out a character's flaws, self-delusions and inconsistencies and then make you love them anyway."

In a review in The Times Literary Supplement, novelist Tash Aw described Love Marriage as a "rich, sensitive and gloriously entertaining novel...brimming with extremely funny moments of excruciating social comedy." Writing in The Financial Times, novelist Susie Boyt called it "wildly entertaining…a bold and generous book". David Sexton in The Sunday Times concurred, describing Love Marriage as:

"Enormously satisfying in its inventions and observations, and its exploration of cultural diversity in Britain. At once touching and satirical...engrossing and enjoyable."

Critical responses were overwhelmingly positive, propelling the novel into The Sunday Times' bestseller list in its first week of publication. Ali announced on her website that television rights to Love Marriage had been sold to New Pictures after a "heated auction", and that it is currently in development with the BBC.

In 2023, Love Marriage was shortlisted for the Comedy Women in Print Prize.

== Views ==
Ali opposed the British government's attempt to introduce the Racial and Religious Hatred Act 2006. She discussed this in her contribution to Free Expression Is No Offence, a collection of essays published by Penguin Books in association with English PEN in 2005.

Ali coined the term of "marketplace for outrage" in an article in The Guardian in which she gives her response to events around the filming of Brick Lane.

From 2015 to 2020, Ali served as a trustee for the Saint Giles Trust, a charity that helps ex-offenders and other marginalised people, and wrote about the need to help newly-released prisoners.

In 2020, Ali was appointed Patron of Hopscotch Women's Centre, a charity that was originally set up by Save the Children to support ethnic minority families who had come to join their partners in the UK. The organisation became independent in 1998 and continues to empower women and girls to achieve their full potential.

== Marks & Spencer's campaign ==
In 2013, Ali was announced as one of several new models for Marks & Spencer's "Womanism" campaign. Subtitled "Britain's leading ladies", the campaign saw Ali appear alongside British women from various fields, including pop singer Ellie Goulding, double Olympic gold medal-winning boxer Nicola Adams, and actress Helen Mirren.

== Personal life ==
Ali lives in South London with her husband, Simon Torrance, a management consultant. They have two children.

== Publications ==
- Brick Lane (2003), Doubleday
- "Knife" (short story), included in The Weekenders: Adventures in Calcutta, Ebury (2004)
- The End of the Affair (introduction), Vintage Classics (2004)
- "Do We Need Laws on Hatred?" (essay), included in Free Expression is No Offence, English PEN (2005)
- Alentejo Blue (2006), Doubleday
- The Painter of Signs (introduction), Penguin Classics (2006)
- In the Kitchen (2009), Doubleday
- Untold Story (2011), Scribner
- Dangerous Edges of Graham Greene (afterword), Continuum (2011)
- "Contrary Motion" (short story), included in Closure: Contemporary Black British Short Stories, Peepal Tree Press (2015)
- "The Son's Tale" (essay), included in Refugee Tales III, Comma Press (2019)
- Love Marriage (2022), Little, Brown

== See also ==
- British Bangladeshi
- List of British Bangladeshis
- List of English writers
