= Brick Lane (novel) =

2003 novel by Monica Ali

- Author: Monica Ali
- Language: English
- Genre: Novel
- Publisher: Scribner
- Publication date: 2003
- Publication place: United Kingdom
- Pages: 413
- ISBN: 978-0385604840

Brick Lane is Monica Ali's 2003 novel named after the London street of the same name. It follows the life of Nazneen, a Bangladeshi woman who moves to London at the age of 18 to marry an older man, Chanu. They live in London Borough of Tower Hamlets. At first, Nazneen's English only consists of sorry and thank you; the novel explores her life and adaptations in the community, as well as the character of Chanu, and their larger ethnic community. An additional narrative strand covers the experiences of Nazneen's sister, Hasina, through the device of her correspondence. After Chanu loses his job, he brings Nazneen a sewing machine which she uses to sew different clothing items brought to her by Chanu. When Chanu gets a job as a taxi driver, a new man named Karim begins to bring Nazneen clothes to sew. Nazneen falls in love with Karim because he is the opposite of Chanu. Nazneen begins an affair with Karim that starts with her attending the youth group he runs. After a while Nazneen becomes very stressed with trying to balance keeping a calm household and the guilt she feels from having the affair.

Although this novel is told from a fiction perspective, the history of Bengalis living in Brick Lane is prominent and very real.

== Reception ==
Upon release, Brick Lane was generally well-received among the British press and was listed as a bestseller by The Daily Telegraph for two weeks.

The Observer described Chanu as "one of the novel's foremost miracles: twice her age, with a face like a frog, a tendency to quote Hume and the boundless doomed optimism of the self-improvement junkie, he is both exasperating and, to the reader at least, enormously loveable." Geraldine Bedell wrote in The Observer that the "most vivid image of the marriage is of her [Nazneen] cutting her husband's corns, a task she seems required to perform with dreadful regularity. [Her husband] is pompous and kindly, full of plans, none of which ever come to fruition, and then of resentment at Ignorant Types who don't promote him or understand his quotations from Shakespeare or his Open University race, ethnicity and class module."

Brick Lane was well received by critics and was shortlisted for the Man Booker Prize.

However, the novel provoked controversy within the Bangladeshi community in Britain. Some in the Brick Lane area thought Ali had portrayed them negatively.

== Film adaptation ==
When production was underway in 2006, some of the Bangladeshi community opposed Ruby Films' intention to film parts of the novel in the Brick Lane area. They formed the Campaign Against Monica Ali's Film Brick Lane. There were also demonstrations against the filming of Brick Lane by the Bangladeshi community in Brick Lane due to the film's negative and stereotyped portrayal of the area and the Bangladeshi community more broadly, and as sociologist Claire Alexander argues, due to it ignoring the area's rich, layered, and subaltern histories in favour of viewing it through an essentialist, racialised, and prejudiced lens.

The writer and activist Germaine Greer expressed support for the campaign, writing in The Guardian:

As British people know little and care less about the Bangladeshi people in their midst, their first appearance as characters in an English novel had the force of a defining caricature ... [S]ome of the Sylhetis of Brick Lane did not recognise themselves. Bengali Muslims smart under an Islamic prejudice that they are irreligious and disorderly, the impure among the pure, and here was a proto-Bengali writer with a Muslim name, portraying them as all of that and more.

Greer criticised Monica Ali's "lack of authenticity", as she had never spent much time in the Brick Lane community, and no longer spoke the Bengali language fluently. The writer Salman Rushdie criticised Greer for getting involved, saying that her statements were "philistine, sanctimonious, and disgraceful, but ... not unexpected."

Brick Lane received a 68% on Rotten Tomatoes.

When reviewing the film a reviewer from IMDb said that film had "Many beautiful touches, but flawed".
