= Insolubilia (Fargo) =

- Fargo episode
- Episode no.: Season 5 Episode 4
- Directed by: Donald Murphy
- Written by: Noah Hawley
- Cinematography by: Bella Gonzales
- Editing by: Regis Kimble
- Production code: XFO05004
- Original air date: December 5, 2023
- Running time: 47 minutes

Guest appearances
- Jessica Pohly as Agent Meyer; Nick Gomez as Agent Joaquin; Kudjo Fiakpui as Jerome; Clare Coulter as Mama Munch; Steven McCarthy as Jordan Seymore; Conrad Coates as Bowman; Sally Bishop as Brandy; Erik Ermantrout as Pace; Stephen Joffe as Lemley

Episode chronology
← Previous "The Paradox of Intermediate Transactions"	Next → "The Tiger"
- Fargo (season 5)

"Insolubilia" is the fourth episode of the fifth season of the American anthology black comedy–crime drama television series Fargo. It is the 45th overall episode of the series and was written by series creator Noah Hawley and directed by Donald Murphy. It originally aired on FX on December 5, 2023.

The season is set in Minnesota and North Dakota in the fall of 2019, and follows Dorothy "Dot" Lyon, a seemingly typical Midwestern housewife living in Scandia, Minnesota, whose mysterious past comes back to haunt her after she lands in hot water with the authorities. One of those authorities is North Dakota Sheriff Roy Tillman, who has been searching for Dot for a long time. In the episode, Gator and his henchmen invade Dot's home to kidnap her. Meanwhile, Roy finds a message from Munch, while Indira and Witt link Dot to the convenience store shootout.

According to Nielsen Media Research, the episode was seen by an estimated 0.424 million household viewers and gained a 0.07 ratings share among adults aged 18–49. The episode received extremely positive reviews from critics, who praised the performances, tension, home invasion sequence and directing.

== Plot ==
Gator (Joe Keery) and his gang prepare to ambush Dot (Juno Temple) inside her house. Despite Dot heavily guarding the house with traps, Gator and the gang easily anticipate and avoid them. As they wander through the house, Dot attacks them and is shocked to see that Gator is one of the invaders. While locking her family in the bedroom, Wayne (David Rysdahl) accidentally shocks himself and falls unconscious, also causing a fire in the house. Dot and Scotty (Sienna King) take Wayne out of the house, while Gator and his gang are forced to flee as the fire department arrives.

While Roy (Jon Hamm) is inside the barn, Munch (Sam Spruell) enters the Tillman house. Roy grabs a shotgun when he sees Munch's footprints. He enters his children's bedroom, finding that Munch has carved a bloodied symbol on the wall. At the police station, Indira (Richa Moorjani) and Witt (Lamorne Morris) find surveillance footage from the gas station, with Indira identifying Dot. As she prepares to talk to her, she is informed that her husband's activities got their family indebted with Lorraine's (Jennifer Jason Leigh) debt collection company. Lorraine goes to the hospital to check on her son, blaming Dot for his condition. As Indira and Witt arrive to question Dot, she decides to visit Wayne at his bed, finding that he has been given morphine. In his state, she tells him that the assailants were trick-or-treaters looking for candy.

FBI agents Meyer (Jessica Pohly) and Joaquin (Nick Gomez) report to their superior about Roy's strange tactics, as many informants have disappeared while investigating him. Their superior compares the events to the Great Chinese Famine, telling them they cannot go to war against Roy and his militia as it would lead to chaos. While annoyed, they are delighted when they find that Dot, whose real name is actually Nadine, has been tracked down in Minnesota. The elderly woman (Clare Coulter) confronts Munch as he rests inside her house, asking what he wants from her; he replies "pancakes".

Gator and his gang return to the Tillman ranch, learning that Munch visited during the previous night. Roy visits a couple, whom he had previously talked to about a prior domestic violence incident. The husband pulls out a gun, but Roy continues insulting him. When the husband decides to shoot, Roy is faster and kills him. Gator arrives and is disturbed by the scene. Noticing that Dot was not caught, Roy plans to frame the dead husband for Munch's crimes at the gas station to close the case, bribing the wife to corroborate the story. As Gator leaves to report the shooting, Roy rides off on horseback into the sunset.

== Production ==
=== Development ===
In November 2023, it was reported that the fourth episode of the season would be titled "Insolubilia", and was to be written by series creator Noah Hawley, and directed by Donald Murphy. This was Hawley's 38th writing credit, and Murphy's second directing credit.

=== Writing ===
For the home invasion scene, Noah Hawley drew comparisons to Home Alone and No Country for Old Men. For the former, he wanted the audience to "feel" the threat; and for the latter, he wanted the "level of suspense even if it has a rusticness to it." To achieve the effect, the series used "I Got You Babe" covered by Tiny Tim as it would be "unsettling." He also wanted the scene to show Dot as a fighter, but also in a humanistic way, saying "She's been so good for so long, but the house is literally destroyed. The life she was trying to protect has ended on some level."

Gator uses a nail-spiked baseball bat as a weapon, and many considered it as a reference to Joe Keery's role as Steve Harrington in Stranger Things, who similarly uses a bat as a weapon. However, Hawley said that this was not an intended nod, explaining "the joke, of course, was that the 12-year-old girl is making a Zombie Killer, and their home defense system is a sledgehammer over the front door. And then, once you created and use that joke, now the Zombie Killer is in play and so of course he's gonna break into the house." The scene required Gator and his gang to wear masks from characters from The Nightmare Before Christmas. Executive producer Steve Stark contacted Tim Burton, who allowed them in using the iconography of the film. Hawley felt the series and the film shared similar concepts, saying "it pretends to be this dark and disturbing thing, but at the center of it is just this guy with a heart of gold, who wants to understand this holiday. It's disturbing, it's comedic, it's sort of more graphic than a children's movie should be, in some places — but never cynically. And I think that echoes what we're trying to do."

David Rysdahl explained that he researched for Wayne's hospital scene, particularly the effects of electrocution. He said, "His brain is not only fried, but the reality that he had been living with has also been shaken. The idea of who he is in relation to his wife and who his wife actually is has all been shaken. So he's awakening from two dreams: The fog of his brain and also the fog of his life. And so I told Noah that I thought it was so fun to play."

== Reception ==
=== Viewers ===
In its original American broadcast, "Insolubilia" was seen by an estimated 0.424 million household viewers and gained a 0.07 ratings share among adults aged 18–49, according to Nielsen Media Research. This means that 0.07 percent of all households with televisions watched the episode. This was a slight decrease in viewership from the previous episode, which was watched by 0.494 million viewers with a 0.08 in the 18-49 demographics.

=== Critical reviews ===
"Insolubilia" received extremely positive reviews from critics. Tom Philip of The A.V. Club gave the episode a "B+" grade and wrote, "After claiming the smallest and easiest of victories, [Roy Tillman] literally rides off into the sunset on horseback. He thinks this is his story, but we're not even halfway done yet."

Alan Sepinwall wrote, "This was largely a fun one, with Dot once again repelling home invaders sent by Roy, this time with adding a touch of John McClane to her now-familiar MacGyver inventiveness. She gets her husband electrocuted, albeit not fatally, but otherwise proves far craftier than Gator and the others expect." Keith Phipps of Vulture gave the episode a 4 star rating out of 5 and wrote, "We're not even halfway through this season of Fargo, so dropping an episode that feels like an action-packed finale this early in the season is an act of either supreme confidence or foolishness. But it seems like the former. So far, season five has been suspenseful and thematically rich; opening this episode with the sort of bang other series would save for the end suggests Noah Hawley and his team are nowhere close to exhausting season five's potential."

Scott Tobias of The New York Times wrote, "Roy believes himself mandated by God and the voters to manage his domain as he sees fit, like tagging one gunshot victim as Munch and burying another before he can be verified as the victim of a “car accident.” Dot still refuses to loosen her grip on a domestic utopia that is now literally turned to ash. Perhaps the two are made for each other, after all." Alec Bojalad of Den of Geek wrote, "Fargo season 5 understands the interplay between the two major American holidays so well that it might even have snuck two other Christmas movies into its Halloween-set fourth episode."

Sean T. Collins of Decider wrote, "This one's a banger. Thrilling, sad, cringe-inducing, bizarre, rousing, grim, and centered on tremendous performances by Juno Temple and Jon Hamm, it's exactly as good as I'd hoped I'd get out of Fargo Season 5, with these ingredients."

=== Accolades ===
TVLine named Jon Hamm as an honorable mention as the "Performer of the Week" for the week of December 9, 2023, for his performance in the episode. The site wrote, "It's been fascinating to watch Jon Hamm explore the dark side of his on-screen charisma as Fargo's Roy Tillman, a swaggering small-town sheriff who makes his own rules and punishes everyone else according to them. This week, Hamm absolutely commanded the screen as Roy confronted an abusive husband, quoting Scripture with a folksy cowboy twang. When he realized his speeches weren't working, he quietly sighed to himself, 'I tried,' and when the husband pulled a gun on him, Roy hardly flinched, with Hamm exuding a serene confidence as Roy gunned down the abuser. Roy is no hero — he's a chauvinistic bully, for one thing — but Hamm has made him mesmerizing nonetheless, a lone ranger literally riding off into the sunset."
