= List of awards and nominations received by Fargo (TV series) =

Fargo awards and nominations
Awards and nominations
Award	Wins	Nominations
ADG Awards	0	4
American Cinema Editors Awards	1	6
American Film Institute Awards	2	2
Artios Awards	1	4
ASCAP Film and Television Music Awards	1	1
Banff Rockie Awards	0	1
Black Reel Awards	1	1
British Society of Cinematographers Awards	0	1
Canadian Society of Cinematographers Awards	0	1
Camerimage	0	1
Cinema Audio Society Awards	1	3
Crime Thriller Awards	0	3
Critics' Choice Television Awards	8	22
Dorian Awards	1	2
Empire Awards	0	1
Golden Globe Awards	3	14
Golden Reel Awards	1	4
Hollywood Music in Media Awards	0	2
International Film Music Critics Association	0	3
Joey Awards	1	1
Location Managers Guild International	0	2
Make-Up Artists and Hair Stylists Guild	1	10
Peabody Awards	1	1
Primetime Emmy Awards	7	70
Producers Guild of America Awards	2	4
Royal Television Society	1	1
Satellite Awards	0	7
Saturn Awards	0	8
Screen Actors Guild Awards	0	2
Screenwriters Choice Awards	0	2
TCA Awards	1	9
Women's Image Network Awards	1	5
Writers Guild of America Awards	1	3

Totals (Note: Certain award groups do not simply award one winner. They acknowledge several different recipients, have runners-up, and have third place. Since this is a specific recognition and is different from losing an award, runner-up mentions are considered wins in this award tally. For simplification and to avoid errors, each award in this list has been presumed to have had a prior nomination.)
- Wins: 36
- Nominations: 201

Fargo is an American black comedy–crime drama anthology television series that debuted on FX on April 15, 2014. Season 1 stars Billy Bob Thornton, Allison Tolman, Colin Hanks and Martin Freeman. Season 2 stars Kirsten Dunst, Patrick Wilson, Jesse Plemons, Jean Smart and Ted Danson. Season 3 stars Ewan McGregor, Carrie Coon, Mary Elizabeth Winstead, Goran Bogdan and David Thewlis. Season 4 stars Chris Rock, Jessie Buckley, Jason Schwartzman, Ben Whishaw and Jack Huston. Season 5 stars Juno Temple, Jon Hamm, Jennifer Jason Leigh, Joe Keery and Richa Moorjani.

The series has been nominated for a total of 201 awards, having won thirty-six of those nominations.

== ADG Awards ==
The ADG Excellence in Production Design Awards (ADG Awards), is an annual award presented by the Art Directors Guild to recognize excellence in production design and art direction in the film and television industries. Honorees are presented with an award made by New York firm, Society Awards.

Year	Category	Nominee	Result	Ref.
2015	Excellence in Production Design for a Television Movie or Limited Series	John Blackie and Warren Alan Young (for "The Crocodile's Dilemma")	Nominated	
2016	Excellence in Production Design for a Television Movie or Limited Series	Warren Alan Young (for "Waiting for Dutch", "Before the Law" and "Fear and Trembling")	Nominated	
2018	Excellence in Production Design for a Television Movie or Limited Series	Elisabeth Williams (for "The Law of Vacant Places", "The Narrow Escape Problem" and "Who Rules the Land of Denial?")	Nominated	
2024	Excellence in Production Design for a One-Hour Contemporary Single-Camera Series	Trevor Smith (for "Trials and Tribulations")	Nominated	

== American Film Institute Awards ==
Established in 2000, the American Film Institute Awards (AFI) is presented by American Film Institute and honors the best ten outstanding films and television programs of each year.

AFI Award nominations for Fargo
Year	Category	Nominee	Result	Ref.
2014	Top 10 TV Shows of the Year	Fargo	Won	
2015	Top 10 TV Shows of the Year	Fargo	Won	

== Artios Awards ==
Since October 1985, the Casting Society of America has presented the Artios Awards for excellence in casting.

Artios Award nominations for Fargo
Year	Category	Nominee	Result	Ref.
2015	TV Movie or Mini-Series	Rachel Tenner, Jackie Lind (location casting), Stephanie Gorin (location casting), Charlene Lee (associate)	Won	
2017	TV Movie or Mini-Series	Rachel Tenner, Jackie Lind (location casting), Stephanie Gorin (location casting), Charlene Lee (associate)	Nominated	
2018	Limited Series	Rachel Tenner, Jackie Lind (location casting), Stephanie Gorin (location casting), Charlene Lee (associate)	Nominated	
2025	Outstanding Achievement in Casting – Limited Series	Rachel Tenner; Rick Messina (associate casting director); Stephanie Gorin, Jackie Lind, Rhonda Fisekci (location casting directors); Brendan Wilcocks (location associate casting director)	Nominated	

== ASCAP Film and Television Music Awards ==
The American Society of Composers, Authors and Publishers Awards honors its top members in a series of annual awards shows in seven different music categories: pop, rhythm and soul, film and television, Latin, country, Christian, and concert music.

ASCAP Award nominations for Fargo
Year	Category	Nominee	Result	Ref.
2015	Top Television Series	Jeff Russo	Won	

== Banff Rockie Awards ==
The Banff World Media Festival (formerly known as the Banff World Television Festival) is an international media event held in the Canadian Rockies at the Fairmont Banff Springs Hotel in Banff, Alberta, Canada. The festival is dedicated to world television and digital content and its creation and development.

Banff Rockie Award nominations for Fargo
Year	Category	Nominee	Result	Ref.
2015	Serial Drama	Fargo	Nominated	

== Black Reel Awards ==
The Black Reel Awards began in 2000 and were designed to annually recognize and celebrate the achievements of black people in feature, independent and television films. Awards range from the art of character portrayals to the artistry displayed behind the camera.

Black Reel Award nominations for Fargo
Year	Category	Nominee	Result	Ref.
2016	Best Supporting Actor in a Television Miniseries or Movie	Bokeem Woodbine	Won	

== British Society of Cinematographers Awards ==
BSCA Award nominations for Fargo
Year	Category	Nominee	Result	Ref.
2021	Best Cinematography in a Television Drama	Dana Gonzales (for "East/West")	Nominated	

== Canadian Society of Cinematographers Awards ==
CSCA Award nominations for Fargo
Year	Category	Nominee	Result	Ref.
2016	TV Series Cinematography	Craig Wrobleski	Nominated	

== Camerimage ==
The International Film Festival of the Art of Cinematography Camerimage is a festival exclusively dedicated to the celebration of cinematography and recognition of its creators, cinematographers.

Camerimage Award nominations for Fargo
Year	Category	Nominee	Result	Ref.
2015	Best Pilot	Matthew J. Lloyd (The Crocodile's Dilemma)	Nominated	

== Cinema Audio Society Awards ==
The Cinema Audio Society Awards, commonly abbreviated as a CAS Awards, was created in 1964 and honors outstanding achievement in sound mixing.

CASA Award nominations for Fargo
Year	Category	Nominee	Result	Ref.
2015	Outstanding Achievement in Sound Mixing – TV Movie or Mini-Series	Michael Playfair, CAS (production mixer), David Raines, CAS (re-recording mixer), Mark Server (re-recording mixer), Andrew Morgado (ADR mixer) (for "The Rooster Prince")	Nominated	
2016	Outstanding Achievement in Sound Mixing – TV Movie or Mini-Series	Michael Playfair, CAS (production mixer), Kirk Lynds (re-recording mixer), Martin Lee (re-recording mixer) (for "The Gift of the Magi")	Won	
2018	Outstanding Achievement in Sound Mixing – TV Movie or Mini-Series	Michael Playfair, CAS (production mixer), Kirk Lynds (re-recording mixer), Martin Lee (re-recording mixer), Michael Perfitt (scoring mixer) (for "The Narrow Escape Problem")	Nominated	

== Crime Thriller Awards ==
The Crime Thriller Awards is a British awards ceremony dedicated to crime thriller fiction.

Crime Thriller Award nominations for Fargo
Year	Category	Nominee	Result	Ref.
2014	Best International TV Series	Fargo	Nominated	
2014	Best Leading Actor	Martin Freeman	Nominated	
2014	Best Supporting Actor	Billy Bob Thornton	Nominated	

== Critics' Choice Television Awards ==
Established in 2011, the Critics' Choice Television Awards is an annual award presented by the Broadcast Television Journalists Association (BTJA).

Critics' Choice Award nominations for Fargo
Year	Category	Nominee	Result	Ref.
2014	Best Miniseries	Fargo	Won	
2014	Best Actor in a Movie or Miniseries	Martin Freeman	Nominated	
2014	Best Actor in a Movie or Miniseries	Billy Bob Thornton	Won	
2014	Best Supporting Actor in a Movie or Miniseries	Colin Hanks	Nominated	
2014	Best Supporting Actress in a Movie or Miniseries	Allison Tolman	Won	
2016	Best Movie/Miniseries	Fargo	Won	
2016	Best Actor in a Movie/Miniseries	Patrick Wilson	Nominated	
2016	Best Actress in a Movie/Miniseries	Kirsten Dunst	Won	
2016	Best Supporting Actor in a Movie/Miniseries	Nick Offerman	Nominated	
2016	Best Supporting Actor in a Movie/Miniseries	Jesse Plemons	Won	
2016	Best Supporting Actor in a Movie/Miniseries	Bokeem Woodbine	Nominated	
2016	Best Supporting Actress in a Movie/Miniseries	Cristin Milioti	Nominated	
2016	Best Supporting Actress in a Movie/Miniseries	Jean Smart	Won	
2018	Best Movie/Miniseries	Fargo	Nominated	
2018	Best Actor in a Movie/Miniseries	Ewan McGregor	Won	
2018	Best Actress in a Movie/Miniseries	Carrie Coon	Nominated	
2018	Best Supporting Actor in a Movie/Miniseries	David Thewlis	Nominated	
2018	Best Supporting Actress in a Movie/Miniseries	Mary Elizabeth Winstead	Nominated	
2021	Best Actor in a Movie/Miniseries	Chris Rock	Nominated	
2021	Best Supporting Actor in a Movie/Miniseries	Glynn Turman	Nominated	
2024	Best Movie/Miniseries	Fargo	Nominated	
2024	Best Actress in a Movie/Miniseries	Juno Temple	Nominated	

== Dorian Awards ==
The Dorian Awards is an annual endeavor organized by the Gay and Lesbian Entertainment Critics Association (GALECA).

Dorian Award nominations for Fargo
Year	Category	Nominee	Result	Ref.
2015	TV Drama of the Year	Fargo	Nominated	
2016	TV Drama of the Year	Fargo	Won	

== Eddie Awards ==
Founded in 1950, the American Cinema Editors (ACE) is an honorary society of film editors that are voted in based on the qualities of professional achievements, their education of others, and their dedication to editing.

Eddie Award nominations for Fargo
Year	Category	Nominee	Result	Ref.
2015	Best Edited Mini-Series or Motion Picture for Television	Regis Kimble ("Buridan's Ass")	Nominated	
2016	Best Edited One-Hour Series for Commercial Television	Skip Macdonald, ACE & Curtis Thurber ("Did You Do This? No, You Did It!")	Nominated	
2018	Best Edited Drama Series for Commercial Television	Henk Van Eeghen, ACE ("Aporia")	Nominated	
2018	Best Edited Drama Series for Commercial Television	Andrew Seklir, ACE ("Who Rules the Land of Denial")	Won	
2024	Best Edited Limited Series	Christopher Nelson ("The Paradox of Intermediate Transactions")	Pending	
2024	Best Edited Limited Series	Regis Kimble ("The Tragedy of the Commons")	Pending	

== Emmy Awards ==
Created in 1949, the Emmy Awards, or simply Emmy, recognizes excellence in the television industry, and corresponds to the Academy Award (for film), the Grammy Award (for music), and the Tony Award (for theatre). Because the Emmy Awards are given in various sectors of the American television industry, they are presented in different annual ceremonies held throughout the year. The Primetime Emmy Awards recognizes outstanding work in American primetime entertainment programming, while Creative Arts Emmy Awards are presented in recognition of technical and other similar achievements, commonly awarded to behind-the-scenes personnel such as art directors, costume designers, cinematographers, casting directors, and sound editors.

=== Primetime Emmy Awards ===
Year	Category	Nominee	Result	Ref.
2014	Outstanding Miniseries	Fargo	Won	
2014	Outstanding Lead Actor in a Miniseries or Movie	Martin Freeman	Nominated	
2014	Outstanding Lead Actor in a Miniseries or Movie	Billy Bob Thornton	Nominated	
2014	Outstanding Supporting Actor in a Miniseries or Movie	Colin Hanks	Nominated	
2014	Outstanding Supporting Actress in a Miniseries or Movie	Allison Tolman	Nominated	
2014	Outstanding Directing for a Miniseries, Movie, or Dramatic Special	Adam Bernstein ("The Crocodile's Dilemma")	Nominated	
2014	Outstanding Directing for a Miniseries, Movie, or Dramatic Special	Colin Bucksey ("Buridan's Ass")	Won	
2014	Outstanding Writing for a Miniseries, Movie, or Dramatic Special	Noah Hawley ("The Crocodile's Dilemma")	Nominated	
2016	Outstanding Limited Series	Fargo	Nominated	
2016	Outstanding Lead Actress in a Limited Series or Movie	Kirsten Dunst	Nominated	
2016	Outstanding Supporting Actor in a Limited Series or Movie	Jesse Plemons	Nominated	
2016	Outstanding Supporting Actor in a Limited Series or Movie	Bokeem Woodbine	Nominated	
2016	Outstanding Supporting Actress in a Limited Series or Movie	Jean Smart	Nominated	
2016	Outstanding Directing for a Limited Series, Movie, or Dramatic Special	Noah Hawley ("Before the Law")	Nominated	
2016	Outstanding Writing for a Limited Series, Movie, or Dramatic Special	Bob DeLaurentis ("Loplop")	Nominated	
2016	Outstanding Writing for a Limited Series, Movie, or Dramatic Special	Noah Hawley ("Palindrome")	Nominated	
2017	Outstanding Limited Series	Fargo	Nominated	
2017	Outstanding Lead Actor in a Limited Series or Movie	Ewan McGregor	Nominated	
2017	Outstanding Lead Actress in a Limited Series or Movie	Carrie Coon	Nominated	
2017	Outstanding Supporting Actor in a Limited Series or Movie	David Thewlis	Nominated	
2017	Outstanding Directing for a Limited Series, Movie, or Dramatic Special	Noah Hawley ("The Law of Vacant Places")	Nominated	
2017	Outstanding Writing for a Limited Series, Movie, or Dramatic Special	Noah Hawley ("The Law of Vacant Places")	Nominated	
2024	Outstanding Limited or Anthology Series	Fargo	Nominated	
2024	Outstanding Lead Actor in a Limited or Anthology Series or Movie	Jon Hamm	Nominated	
2024	Outstanding Lead Actress in a Limited or Anthology Series or Movie	Juno Temple	Nominated	
2024	Outstanding Supporting Actor in a Limited or Anthology Series or Movie	Lamorne Morris ("Blanket")	Won	
2024	Outstanding Directing for a Limited or Anthology Series or Movie	Noah Hawley ("The Tragedy of the Commons")	Nominated	
2024	Outstanding Writing for a Limited or Anthology Series or Movie	Noah Hawley ("The Tragedy of the Commons")	Nominated	

=== Creative Arts Emmy Award ===
Year	Category	Nominee	Result	Ref.
2014	Outstanding Casting for a Miniseries, Movie, or Special	Rachel Tenner, Jackie Lind, and Stephanie Gorin	Won	
2014	Outstanding Cinematography for a Miniseries or Movie	Dana Gonzales ("Buridan's Ass")	Nominated	
2014	Outstanding Cinematography for a Miniseries or Movie	Matt Lloyd ("The Crocodile's Dilemma")	Nominated	
2014	Outstanding Single-Camera Picture Editing for a Miniseries or Movie	Regis Kimble ("Buridan's Ass")	Nominated	
2014	Outstanding Single-Camera Picture Editing for a Miniseries or Movie	Skip MacDonald ("The Crocodile's Dilemma")	Nominated	
2014	Outstanding Single-Camera Picture Editing for a Miniseries or Movie	Bridget Durnford ("The Rooster Prince")	Nominated	
2014	Outstanding Makeup for a Miniseries or Movie (Non-Prosthetic)	Gail Kennedy, Joanne Preece, Gunther Schetterer, and Keith Sayer	Nominated	
2014	Outstanding Music Composition for a Miniseries, Movie, or Special	Jeff Russo ("The Crocodile's Dilemma")	Nominated	
2014	Outstanding Sound Editing for a Miniseries, Movie or a Special	Frank Laratta, Kevin Buchholz, John Peccatiello, Skye Lewin, Jason Lawrence, Brent Planiden, Adam DeCoster, and Andrew Morgado ("The Crocodile's Dilemma")	Nominated	
2014	Outstanding Sound Mixing for a Miniseries or Movie	Mike Playfair, David Raines, Mark Server, and Chris Philp ("The Crocodile's Dilemma")	Nominated	
2016	Outstanding Casting for a Limited Series, Movie, or Special	Rachel Tenner, Jackie Lind, and Stephanie Gorin	Nominated	
2016	Outstanding Cinematography for a Limited Series or Movie	Dana Gonzales ("Waiting for Dutch")	Won	
2016	Outstanding Single-Camera Picture Editing for a Limited Series or Movie	Skip MacDonald ("Waiting for Dutch")	Nominated	
2016	Outstanding Single-Camera Picture Editing for a Limited Series or Movie	Curtis Thurber and Skip MacDonald ("Did you do this? No, you did it!")	Nominated	
2016	Outstanding Makeup for a Limited Series or Movie (Non-Prosthetic)	Gail Kennedy, Joanne Preece, Gunther Schetterer, and Danielle Hanson	Nominated	
2016	Outstanding Music Composition for a Limited Series, Movie, or Special	Jeff Russo ("Loplop")	Nominated	
2016	Outstanding Production Design for a Narrative Period Program (One Hour or More)	Warren A. Young, Elisabeth Williams, and Shirley Inget ("Waiting for Dutch")	Nominated	
2016	Outstanding Hairstyling for a Limited Series or Movie	Chris Glimsdale, Judy Durbacz, Penny Thompson, Cindy Ferguson, and Tracy Murray	Nominated	
2016	Outstanding Sound Editing for a Limited Series, Movie or a Special	Kurt N. Forshager, Joe Bracciale, Robert Bertola, Paul Shikata, Mark Bensi, and John Elliot ("The Castle")	Won	
2016	Outstanding Sound Mixing for a Limited Series or Movie	Martin Lee, Kirk Lynds, and Michael Playfair ("The Gift of the Magi")	Nominated	
2017	Outstanding Casting for a Limited Series, Movie, or Special	Rachel Tenner, Jackie Lind, and Stephanie Gorin	Nominated	
2017	Outstanding Cinematography for a Limited Series or Movie	Dana Gonzales ("The Law of Vacant Places")	Nominated	
2017	Outstanding Single-Camera Picture Editing for a Limited Series or Movie	Henk van Eeghen ("Aporia")	Nominated	
2017	Outstanding Single-Camera Picture Editing for a Limited Series or Movie	Regis Kimble ("The Law of Vacant Places")	Nominated	
2017	Outstanding Single-Camera Picture Editing for a Limited Series or Movie	Curtis Thurber ("The Narrow Escape Problem")	Nominated	
2017	Outstanding Makeup for a Limited Series or Movie (Non-Prosthetic)	Gail Kennedy, Joanne Preece, Amanda Rye, and Danielle Hanson	Nominated	
2017	Outstanding Music Composition for a Limited Series, Movie, or Special	Jeff Russo ("Aporia")	Won	
2017	Outstanding Hairstyling for a Limited Series or Movie	Chris Glimsdale, Judy Durbacz, Penny Thompson, and Eva Blanchard	Nominated	
2017	Outstanding Sound Editing for a Limited Series, Movie or a Special	Kurt N. Forshager, Joe Bracciale, Martin Gwynn Jones, Brent Pickett, Claire Dobson, Robert Bertola, Alex Bullick, Tyler Whitham, Matt Decker, and John Elliot ("Who Rules the Land of Denial?")	Nominated	
2017	Outstanding Sound Mixing for a Limited Series or Movie	Martin Lee, Kirk Lynds, Michael Playfair and Michael Perftt ("Who Rules the Land of Denial?")	Nominated	
2021	Outstanding Cinematography for a Limited or Anthology Series or Movie	Dana Gonzales ("East/West")	Nominated	
2021	Outstanding Music Composition for a Limited or Anthology Series, Movie or Special	Jeff Russo ("East/West")	Nominated	
2021	Outstanding Sound Editing for a Limited or Anthology Series, Movie or Special	Kurt Nicholas Forshager, Tim Boggs, Todd Niesen, Matt Temple, Adam Parrish King, Brad Bakelmun, Ben Schor, Stef Fraticelli, and Jason Charbonneau ("East/West")	Nominated	
2024	Outstanding Casting for a Limited or Anthology Series or Movie	Rachel Tenner, Jackie Lind, Stephanie Gorin, and Rhonda Fisekci	Nominated	
2024	Outstanding Cinematography for a Limited or Anthology Series or Movie	Dana Gonzales ("The Tragedy of the Commons")	Nominated	
2024	Outstanding Contemporary Costumes for a Limited or Anthology Series or Movie	Carol Case, Charl Boettger, and Michelle Carr ("Insolubilia")	Nominated	
2024	Outstanding Music Composition for a Limited or Anthology Series, Movie or Special (Original Dramatic Score)	Jeff Russo ("Blanket")	Nominated	
2024	Outstanding Music Supervision	Maggie Phillips ("The Tragedy of the Commons")	Nominated	
2024	Outstanding Picture Editing for a Limited or Anthology Series or Movie	Regis Kimble ("The Tragedy of the Commons")	Nominated	
2024	Outstanding Production Design for a Narrative Contemporary Program (One Hour or More)	Trevor Smith, Cathy Cowan, and Amber Humphries ("Trials and Tribulations")	Nominated	
2024	Outstanding Sound Editing for a Limited or Anthology Series, Movie or Special	Nick Forshager, Joe Bracciale, Dustin Harris, Alex Bullick, Brad Bakelmun, Ben Schor, Jason Charbonneau, and Stefan Fraticelli ("Trials and Tribulations")	Nominated	
2024	Outstanding Sound Mixing for a Limited or Anthology Series or Movie	Martin Lee, Kirk Lynds, Michael Playfair, and Michael Perfitt ("Trials and Tribulations")	Nominated	

== Empire Awards ==
The Empire Awards, is an annual British awards ceremony honoring cinematic achievements in the local and global film industry. Winners are awarded the Empire Award statuette. The awards, first presented in 1996, are presented by the British film magazine Empire with the winners voted by the readers of the magazine.

Empire Award nominations for Fargo
Year	Category	Nominee	Result	Ref.
2016	Best TV Series	Fargo	Nominated	

== Golden Globe Awards ==
The Golden Globe Award is an American award by 93 members of the Hollywood Foreign Press Association (HFPA) recognizing excellence in film and television, both domestic and foreign.

Year	Category	Nominee	Result	Ref.
2015	Best Miniseries or Television Film	Fargo	Won	
2015	Best Actor – Miniseries or Television Film	Martin Freeman	Nominated	
2015	Best Actor – Miniseries or Television Film	Billy Bob Thornton	Won	
2015	Best Actress – Miniseries or Television Film	Allison Tolman	Nominated	
2015	Best Supporting Actor – Series, Miniseries or Television Film	Colin Hanks	Nominated	
2016	Best Miniseries or Television Film	Fargo	Nominated	
2016	Best Actor – Miniseries or Television Film	Patrick Wilson	Nominated	
2016	Best Actress – Miniseries or Television Film	Kirsten Dunst	Nominated	
2018	Best Miniseries or Television Film	Fargo	Nominated	
2018	Best Actor – Miniseries or Television Film	Ewan McGregor	Won	
2018	Best Supporting Actor – Series, Miniseries or Television Film	David Thewlis	Nominated	
2024	Best Miniseries or Television Film	Fargo	Nominated	
2024	Best Actor – Miniseries or Television Film	Jon Hamm	Nominated	
2024	Best Actress – Miniseries or Television Film	Juno Temple	Nominated	

== Golden Reel Awards ==
Founded in 1953, the Motion Picture Sound Editors (MPSE) is an honorary society of motion picture sound editors. Since 1989, they present the Golden Reel Awards, in which honors the best work in the various areas of sound editing.

Golden Reel Award nominations for Fargo
Year	Category	Nominee	Result	Ref.
2015	TV Short Form Music Score	Skye Lewin (for "The Crocodile's Dilemma")	Won	
2015	TV Short Form – Effects/Foley	Frank Laratta, Kevin Buchholz, John Peccatiello, Andrew Morgado, Adam Decoster (for "Buridan's Ass")	Nominated	
2016	Best Sound Editing in Television – Short Form: Sound Effects and Foley	Nick Forshager	Nominated	
2024	Outstanding Achievement in Music Editing – Broadcast Long Form	Ben Schor (for "The Tiger")	Nominated	

== Hollywood Music in Media Awards ==
The Hollywood Music in Media Awards recognizes and honors the music of visual mediums (film, TV, movie trailers, video games, commercials, etc.), the talented individuals responsible for creating, producing and placing it and the music of artists, both mainstream and independent, from around the globe.

Hollywood Music in Media Award nominations for Fargo
Year	Category	Nominee	Result	Ref.
2016	Original Score – TV Show/Mini Series	Jeff Russo	Nominated	
2017	Original Score – TV Show/Limited Series	Jeff Russo	Nominated	

== IFMCA Awards ==
The annual International Film Music Critics Association Awards are the only awards given to composers by active film music journalists, and which are seen by many as a valuable precursor to the Academy Awards in the absence of a guild for composers.

IFMCA Award nominations for Fargo
Year	Category	Nominee	Result	Ref.
2015	Best Original Score for a Television Series	Jeff Russo	Nominated	
2016	Best Original Score for a Television Series	Jeff Russo	Nominated	
2018	Best Original Score for a Television Series	Jeff Russo	Nominated	

== Joey Awards ==
The Joey Awards goal is to reward young actors and actresses in Canada for their hard work and dedication to their craft.

Joey Award nominations for Fargo
Year	Category	Nominee	Result	Ref.
2014	Young Actor – Age 12 or Younger in a TV Series Drama – Supporting/Recurring	Spencer Drever	Won	

== Location Managers Guild International Awards ==
The Location Managers Guild International is an organization of experienced career professionals in the motion picture, television, commercial and print production industries.

LMGI Award nominations for Fargo
Year	Category	Nominee	Result	Ref.
2016	Outstanding Locations in a Period Television Series	Matt Palmer and Rob Hilton	Nominated	
2018	Outstanding Locations in a Contemporary Television Series	Robert Hilton	Nominated	

== Make-Up Artists and Hair Stylists Guild Awards ==
The Make-Up Artists and Hair Stylists Guild is an American labor union representing make-up artists and hair stylist in feature films, television programs, commercials, live network events and theatrical productions in the United States.

Make-Up Artists and Hair Stylists Guild Award nominations for Fargo
Year	Category	Nominee	Result	Ref.
2015	Mini-Series or TV Movie Contemporary Make-Up	Gail Kennedy and Joanne Preece	Won	
2015	Mini-Series or TV Movie Period and/or Character Make-up	Chris Glimsdale and Keith Sayer	Nominated	
2015	Mini-Series or TV Movie Special Make-up Effects	Gail Kennedy, David Trainor and Gunther Schetterer	Nominated	
2015	Mini-Series or TV Movie Contemporary Hair Styling	Gail Kennedy and Joanne Preece	Nominated	
2016	Television Mini Series (Movie of the Week) – Best Period and/or Character Make-Up	Gail Kennedy, Joanne Preece and Gunther Schetterer	Nominated	
2016	Television Mini Series (Movie of the Week) – Best Special Make-Up Effects	Gail Kennedy, Dave Trainor and Tea-Christina Scott	Nominated	
2018	TV Mini Series or Movie Made for Television – Best Contemporary Make-Up	Gail Kennedy, Joanne Preece and Danielle Hanson	Nominated	
2018	TV Mini Series or Movie Made for Television – Best Contemporary Hair Styling	Chris Glimsdale, Penny Thompson and Judy Durbacz	Nominated	
2018	TV Mini Series or Movie Made for Television – Best Period/Character Hair Styling	Chris Glimsdale and Carol Doran	Nominated	
2018	TV Mini Series or Movie Made for Television – Best Special Make-Up Effects	Gail Kennedy, Dave Trainor and Christina Tea Scott	Nominated	

== Peabody Awards ==
When the first set of Peabody Awards were given out in 1941, broadcasting meant radio. Before the decade was over, the scope of the award grew to include television storytelling. By the late 20th Century, television was redefined through cable and satellite technologies. The Peabody Awards again recognized shifts in storytelling as a result of these changes.

Peabody Award nominations for Fargo
Year	Category	Nominee	Result	Ref.
2015	Peabody Award	Fargo	Won	

== Producers Guild of America Awards ==
The Producers Guild of America Awards was established in 1990 by the Producers Guild of America, in order to honor the visionaries who produce and execute motion picture and television product.

Producers Guild Award nominations for Fargo
Year	Category	Nominee	Result	Ref.
2015	Outstanding Producer of Long-Form Television	Adam Bernstein, John Cameron, Ethan Coen, Joel Coen, Michael Frislev, Noah Hawley, Warren Littlefield, Chad Oakes and Kim Todd	Won	
2016	Outstanding Producer of Long-Form Television	Noah Hawley, John Cameron, Ethan Coen, Joel Coen, Warren Littlefield and Kim Todd	Won	
2018	Outstanding Producer of Long-Form Television	Noah Hawley, Warren Littlefield, Ethan Coen, Joel Coen, John Cameron, Steve Blackman, Bob DeLaurentis, Matt Wolpert, Ben Nedivi, Monica Beletsky, Kim Todd, Leslie Cowan, Regis Kimble, Chad Oakes and Michael Frislev	Nominated	
2024	Outstanding Producer of Limited or Anthology Series Television	Fargo	Nominated	

== Royal Television Society Programme Awards ==
The Royal Television Society, or RTS, is a British-based educational charity for the discussion, and analysis of television in all its forms, past, present and future. It is the oldest television society in the world.

RTS Award nominations for Fargo
Year	Category	Nominee	Result	Ref.
2015	Best International TV Series	Fargo	Won	

== Satellite Awards ==
The Satellite Awards are annual awards given by the International Press Academy (IPA) that are commonly noted in entertainment industry journals and blogs.

Satellite Award nominations for Fargo
Year	Category	Nominee	Result	Ref.
2015	Best Television Series – Drama	Fargo	Nominated	
2015	Best Actor – Television Series Drama	Martin Freeman	Nominated	
2015	Best Actor – Television Series Drama	Billy Bob Thornton	Nominated	
2015	Best Supporting Actress – Series, Miniseries or Television Film	Allison Tolman	Nominated	
2016	Best Television Series – Drama	Fargo	Nominated	
2016	Best Actress – Television Series Drama	Kirsten Dunst	Nominated	
2018	Best Actor – Miniseries or Television Film	Ewan McGregor	Nominated	

== Saturn Awards ==
The Saturn Award is an award presented annually by the Academy of Science Fiction, Fantasy and Horror Films to honor the top works mainly in science fiction, fantasy, and horror in film, television, and home video.

Saturn Award nominations for Fargo
Year	Category	Nominee	Result	Ref.
2016	Best Action-Thriller Television Series	Fargo	Nominated	
2016	Best Supporting Actor on Television	Patrick Wilson	Nominated	
2018	Best Action-Thriller Television Series	Fargo	Nominated	
2018	Best Actress on Television	Mary Elizabeth Winstead	Nominated	
2025	Best Television Presentation	Fargo	Pending	
2025	Best Actor in a Television Series	Jon Hamm	Pending	
2025	Best Supporting Actor in a Television Series	Lamorne Morris	Pending	
2025	Best Supporting Actress in a Television Series	Jennifer Jason Leigh	Pending	

== Screen Actors Guild Awards ==
The Screen Actors Guild Awards, also known as the SAG Award, is an accolade given by the Screen Actors Guild‐American Federation of Television and Radio Artists (SAG-AFTRA) to recognize outstanding performances in film and primetime television.

SAG Award nominations for Fargo
Year	Category	Nominee	Result	Ref.
2015	Outstanding Performance by a Male Actor in a Miniseries or Television Movie	Billy Bob Thornton	Nominated	
2024	Outstanding Performance by a Male Actor in a Miniseries or Television Movie	Jon Hamm	Nominated	

== Screenwriters Choice Awards ==
The Screenwriters Choice Awards honors writers in four categories: Best Original Screenplay, Best Adapted Screenplay, Best Television Comedy, and Best Television Drama.

Screenwriters Choice Award nominations for Fargo
Year	Category	Nominee	Result	Ref.
2015	Best Television Drama	Noah Hawley	Nominated	
2016	Best Television Drama	Steve Blackman and Robert De Laurentiis & Noah Hawley	Nominated	

== Television Critics Association Awards ==
The TCA Awards is presented by the Television Critics Association in recognition of excellence in television.

TCA Award nominations for Fargo
Year	Category	Nominee	Result	Ref.
2014	Outstanding New Program	Fargo	Nominated	
2014	Outstanding Achievement in Movies, Miniseries, and Specials	Fargo	Nominated	
2016	Program of the Year	Fargo	Nominated	
2016	Outstanding Achievement in Movies, Miniseries, and Specials	Fargo	Nominated	
2017	Outstanding Achievement in Movies, Miniseries, and Specials	Fargo	Nominated	
2017	Individual Achievement in Drama	Carrie Coon	Won	
2024	Outstanding Achievement in Drama	Fargo	Nominated	
2024	Outstanding Achievement in Movies, Miniseries, and Specials	Fargo	Nominated	
2024	Individual Achievement in Drama	Juno Temple	Nominated	

== Women's Image Network Awards ==
Women's Image Network produces The Women's Image Network Awards to celebrate male and female media artists whose work advances the value of women and girls.

Women's Image Network Award nominations for Fargo
Year	Category	Nominee	Result	Ref.
2014	Made-for-TV Movie/Mini-Series	Fargo	Nominated	
2014	Actress Made-for-TV Movie/Miniseries	Allison Tolman	Nominated	
2016	Made-for-TV Movie/Mini-Series	Fargo	Nominated	
2016	Actress Made-for-TV Movie/Miniseries	Jean Smart	Won	
2016	Actress Made-for-TV Movie/Miniseries	Kirsten Dunst	Nominated	

== Writers Guild of America Awards ==
The Writers Guild of America Awards is presented annually by the Writers Guild of America, East and Writers Guild of America, West since 1949.

WGA Award nominations for Fargo
Year	Category	Nominee	Result	Ref.
2016	Long Form Adapted	Steve Blackman, Bob DeLaurentis, Noah Hawley, Ben Nedivi and Matt Wolpert	Won	
2018	Long Form Adapted	Monica Beletsky, Bob DeLaurentis, Noah Hawley, Ben Nedivi and Matt Wolpert	Nominated	
2024	Limited Series	Thomas Bezucha, Bob DeLaurentis, Noah Hawley, April Shih	Nominated	
