= The Tiger (Fargo) =

- Fargo episode
- Episode no.: Season 5 Episode 5
- Directed by: Dana Gonzales
- Written by: Noah Hawley
- Narrated by: Jason Schwartzman (uncredited)
- Cinematography by: Pete Konczal
- Editing by: Skip Macdonald
- Production code: XFO05005
- Original air date: December 12, 2023
- Running time: 42 minutes

Guest appearances
- Lukas Gage as Lars Olmstead; Andrew Wheeler as Vivian Dugger; Steven McCarthy as Jordan Seymore; Jessica Pohly as Agent Meyer; Nick Gomez as Agent Joaquin; Kudjo Fiakpui as Jerome; Conrad Coates as Bowman

Episode chronology
| ← Previous "Insolubilia" | Next → "The Tender Trap" |
- Fargo season 5

"The Tiger" is the fifth episode of the fifth season of the American anthology black comedy–crime drama television series Fargo. It is the 46th overall episode of the series and was written by series creator Noah Hawley and directed by producer Dana Gonzales. It originally aired on FX on December 12, 2023.

The season is set in Minnesota and North Dakota in the fall of 2019, and follows Dorothy "Dot" Lyon, a seemingly typical Midwestern housewife living in Scandia, Minnesota, whose mysterious past comes back to haunt her after she lands in hot water with the authorities. One of those authorities is North Dakota Sheriff Roy Tillman, who has been searching for Dot for a long time. In the episode, Lorraine has Dot committed to an asylum, while she also meets with Roy.

According to Nielsen Media Research, the episode was seen by an estimated 0.451 million household viewers and gained a 0.07 ratings share among adults aged 18–49. The episode received extremely positive reviews from critics; while Juno Temple's performance was praised, some felt that the episode's narration found the series treading similar ground.

== Plot ==
Even though she grants Dot (Juno Temple) hospitality at her mansion, Lorraine (Jennifer Jason Leigh) raises her suspicions with Danish (Dave Foley). Danish leads a group of paramedics to Dot's room, and has her psychiatrically committed. However, Dot improvises a plan when she arrives at the clinic and escapes her room by subduing one orderly and stealing a nurse's uniform.

Roy (Jon Hamm) visits Lorraine, revealing his marriage with Dot. While she dislikes Dot, Lorraine is not willing to give her to Roy as it may negatively impact her family. Instead, she tells Roy that she will donate to his re-election campaign if he will drop the matter, telling him that Wayne (David Rysdahl) is Dot's husband now, as seven years have passed. Roy refutes this and leaves. Indira (Richa Moorjani) arrives to report Dot's escape to Danish. Roy hears this and calls Gator (Joe Keery) and directs him and his henchmen to kidnap Wayne. At the hospital, Dot notices the henchmen arriving at the reception desk and realizes that they intend to take Wayne. She swaps Wayne's door nametag with the nametag of the man across the hall before entering Wayne's room where she coaches Wayne to lock himself in his bathroom.

Dot leaves Wayne's room just as the henchmen arrive. They enter the room across the hall, and take the wrong man. As she walks away, she accidentally bumps into FBI agents Meyer (Jessica Pohly) and Joaquin (Nick Gomez), who recognize her as Nadine. As they try to talk to her, Gator, who was told to wait in the car due to his previous failures, passes by and recognizes her, after having seen that the FBI are also at the hospital. He meets up with the henchmen just as they take the man they believe to be Wayne and enter an elevator to leave the hospital, with Gator silently gesturing to Dot to keep quiet. Dot asks for a moment alone and enters a bathroom, during which the orderly she'd subdued earlier informs the agents that she is an escapee. They enter the bathroom, only to find that she has climbed out the window.

Indira questions Lorraine about having Dot committed, but she deviates from her interrogation by highlighting Indira's debts. As Scotty (Sienna King) plays outside, Dot sneaks onto the property, where she secretly meets and runs away with her, which alerts Danish and Lorraine's guards. When Indira arrives at her house, she's surprised to find Dot and Scotty inside her kitchen. Dot asks Indira to take care of Scotty for a few days, but Indira insists that Dot explain her past before making a decision. Dot reveals that she married Roy at age 17 after being taken in by his henchmen at age 15, alluding to the abuse she experienced during her time with Roy. Lars (Lukas Gage) arrives from the garage and Indira presents Dot as a friend, "Alice", before informing him that Scotty will be staying with them for a few days, much to Dot's relief. Dot then drives off into the night, with the main Fargo theme music playing.

== Production ==
=== Development ===
In November 2023, it was reported that the fifth episode of the season would be titled "The Tiger", and was to be written by series creator Noah Hawley, and directed by producer Dana Gonzales. This was Hawley's 38th writing credit, and Gonzales' fifth directing credit.

== Reception ==
=== Viewers ===
In its original American broadcast, "The Tiger" was seen by an estimated 0.451 million household viewers and gained a 0.07 ratings share among adults aged 18–49, according to Nielsen Media Research. This means that 0.07 percent of all households with televisions watched the episode. This was a slight increase in viewership from the previous episode, which was watched by 0.424 million viewers with a 0.07 in the 18-49 demographics.

=== Critical reviews ===
"The Tiger" received positive reviews from critics. Tom Philip of The A.V. Club gave the episode a "C" grade and wrote, "'Show, don't tell' is one of the first rules that anyone who fancies themselves a writer must absorb. As with most writing advice, it should really be presented as more of a guideline. Sometimes simply telling is good. A character acknowledging their reality is powerful, or funny, or terrifying when it's done right. It annoys me, is the takeaway here, but even with a show as brash and unsubtle as Fargo, I found myself frustrated by this week's episode, 'The Tiger,' and its fragmented, obvious storytelling."

Alan Sepinwall wrote, "Leigh and Jon Hamm together are a delight. Of all my initial Coen brothers movie takes, the worst is probably not liking what Leigh was doing in The Hudsucker Proxy. This spiritual sequel to that performance is wonderful." Keith Phipps of Vulture gave the episode a 4 star rating out of 5 and wrote, "Dot seemingly just wants to hide. Ole called her 'for real, a tiger,' and that seemed to be the best label, even before 'The Tiger,' an episode that makes the connection explicit via a voice-over that highlights a point-by-point comparison. It's a little precious, if precious is the right word for the violence and mayhem the voice-over accompanies. But it also feels dead-on. Fierce, wily, and protective, Dot most resembles a tiger for real."

Scott Tobias of The New York Times wrote, "Lingering over all these developments is a big question that Fargo seems content in putting off for as long as possible: Who is Dot, anyway? Or, more to the point, who is Lorraine? How did this reedy housewife from suburban Minnesota acquire a certain set of skills like Liam Neeson in the Taken movies? For now, it's helpful for Dot to have powerful women like Lorraine and Olmstead in her corner. But tigers are inscrutable, too." Sean T. Collins of Decider wrote, "While its Kill Bill-style title card and corny nature-show narration might lead you to suspect otherwise when the episode begins, this is not an especially over-the-top episode of Fargo in the end. No, in the end it drills down into the “six kinds of hell” Dorothy Lyon has crawled through to get to her husband and daughter."

=== Accolades ===
TVLine named Jennifer Jason Leigh as an honorable mention as the "Performer of the Week" for the week of December 16, 2023, for her performance in the episode. The site wrote, "Fargo has had its share of charismatic villains across five seasons, and Jennifer Jason Leigh is carrying on that grand tradition as obscenely wealthy matriarch Lorraine Lyon, who looks physically pained when she has to speak to someone below her social station. Leigh brings a chilly elegance to Lorraine with her superior vocal tone and bored demeanor, and this week, she put on a rhetorical masterclass, with Lorraine dismantling a pair of bankers who dared to underestimate her business acumen before moving on to dress down macho sheriff Roy. She even found time to taunt poor Indira for tumbling into a lifetime of debt. We can't say we're rooting for Lorraine, exactly, but we are definitely enjoying the barrage of verbal fireworks that Leigh brings to the party."
