= Trials and Tribulations (Fargo) =

- Fargo episode
- Episode no.: Season 5 Episode 2
- Directed by: Noah Hawley
- Written by: Noah Hawley
- Cinematography by: Dana Gonzales
- Editing by: Skip Macdonald
- Production code: XFO05002
- Original air date: November 21, 2023
- Running time: 47 minutes

Guest appearances
- Jessica Pohly as Agent Meyer; Nick Gomez as Agent Joaquin; Kudjo Fiakpui as Jerome; Conrad Coates as Bowman; Erik Ermantrout as Pace; Stephen Joffe as Lemley

Episode chronology
← Previous "The Tragedy of the Commons"	Next → "The Paradox of Intermediate Transactions"
- Fargo (season 5)

"Trials and Tribulations" is the second episode of the fifth season of the American anthology black comedy–crime drama television series Fargo. It is the 43rd overall episode of the series and was written and directed by series creator Noah Hawley. It originally aired on FX on November 21, 2023, airing back-to-back with the previous episode, "The Tragedy of the Commons".

The season is set in Minnesota and North Dakota in the fall of 2019, and follows Dorothy "Dot" Lyon, a seemingly typical Midwestern housewife living in Scandia, Minnesota, whose mysterious past comes back to haunt her after she lands in hot water with the authorities. One of those authorities is North Dakota Sheriff Roy Tillman, who has been searching for Dot for a long time. In the episode, Dot evades questions over her kidnapping, while Roy Tillman is introduced as a person who has been looking for Dot.

According to Nielsen Media Research, the episode was seen by an estimated 0.311 million household viewers and gained a 0.08 ratings share among adults aged 18–49. The episode received positive reviews from critics, who praised the performances and intrigue behind the character of Roy Tillman.

== Plot ==
In Stark County, North Dakota, Sheriff Roy Tillman (Jon Hamm) meets with a married couple after the husband abused his wife. Roy has the husband strangled, but only for not doing his job as husband properly. He spares the man's life but advises the couple to fix their problems. Roy and his son Gator (Joe Keery) go to his ranch to meet with Munch (Sam Spruell), who admonishes Roy for not disclosing enough details about Dot (Juno Temple). The conversation reveals that Dot is Roy's estranged wife, who Roy tracked to Minnesota after her fingerprints appeared in the system following her arrest. Munch demands to be paid thrice his original payment due to his injuries, which Roy accepts. Gator takes Munch to pay him, only to reveal that Roy has ordered his execution. Munch kills Roy's henchmen, injures Gator, and escapes the barn.

Back in Minnesota, Indira (Richa Moorjani) questions Dot about her disappearance, especially as her blood type does not match the blood she had found inside Dot's house. Wayne (David Rysdahl) supports Dot's story and Indira is forced to leave after failing to make headway. Lorraine (Jennifer Jason Leigh) is informed by her attorney Danish (Dave Foley) about Dot's return and questions Dot's motives. Roy is visited by FBI agents Joaquin (Nick Gomez) and Meyer (Jessica Pohly), who question his failure to enforce federal laws. Roy, a so-called "constitutional sheriff", proclaims himself to be the law and states that he does what he believes is best.

Lorraine visits Dot, expressing her displeasure at the fact that Wayne chose to marry her. She offers Dot two years of "staking" her if she leaves Wayne. Dot drops her Minnesota accent and bluntly refuses the offer, threatening Lorraine with any possible repercussions. Dot then gets Scotty (Sienna King) to help her in making homemade traps around their house, knowing that Munch will return. Lorraine and Danish talk with Wayne at his Kia dealership office, with Danish reporting that a woman resembling Dot was involved in the shootout at the gas station. Lorraine is convinced that Dot is involved in some scheme and wants Wayne's cooperation. Indira visits a recovering Witt (Lamorne Morris) in the hospital, only to be joined by Gator. Indira tries to get Witt to identify Dot, but Gator erases Dot's mugshot.

Wayne arrives home and is shocked by the amount of traps that Dot and Scotty have set around the house. He once again questions Dot about her disappearance and reveals Lorraine's suspicions, but Dot convinces him that they are on the same side. As they return home, Gator and his partner stop by the gas station. While Gator goes inside, Munch kills his partner. Gator returns to the car and is shocked to discover the corpse, with a note demanding payment impaled to his chest with a hunting knife.

== Production ==
=== Development ===
In October 2023, it was reported that the second episode of the season would be titled "Trials and Tribulations", and was to be written and directed by series creator Noah Hawley. This was Hawley's 36th writing credit, and sixth directing credit.

=== Filming ===
For the hot tub scene, Jon Hamm had to use fake pierced nipples. He explained, "I had to have some very blue latex put on my nipples, and then they cast a resoundingly lifelike pair of nipples, which they then pierced and placed over my own nipples, and we shot said nipples. The crew doesn't get enough credit, but there was a dedicated nippleologist."

== Reception ==
=== Viewers ===
In its original American broadcast, "Trials and Tribulations" was seen by an estimated 0.311 million household viewers and gained a 0.08 ratings share among adults aged 18–49, according to Nielsen Media Research. This means that 0.08 percent of all households with televisions watched the episode. This was a 45% decrease in viewership from the previous episode, which was watched by 0.566 million viewers with a 0.12 in the 18-49 demographics.

=== Critical reviews ===
"Trials and Tribulations" received positive reviews from critics. Tom Philip of The A.V. Club gave the episode a "B" grade and wrote, "The walls are rapidly closing in on Dot, between Tillman's son Gator doing his best to disrupt Olmstead's investigation and her mother-in-law now understanding just what kind of adversary she's dealing with. Ten years ago, Dorothy Lyons made some promises. Now, it seems, payment is due."

Keith Phipps of Vulture gave the episode a 4 star rating out of 5 and wrote, "Ole's acting as a wild card. Yet even if the setup looks clear, where all this is heading remains a mystery. But it's probably not heading toward a peaceful solution." Alec Bojalad of Den of Geek wrote, "Fargo season 5 does indeed have a lot to say about spiritual liability and the concept of sin as a debt. But to go further down that road would represent a major spoiler for episode 3. Really, the show has debt covered from every angle and 'debt' is the predominant word to keep in mind while watching the season's remaining eight episodes."

Scott Tobias of The New York Times wrote, "In its persistent engagement with the Coenverse so far, Fargo has done best when it tweaks our expectations rather than simply reward fans with references to different movies." Sean T. Collins of Decider wrote, "Once again, writer-director Hawley displays his facility for building tension and dread; the long take that includes the stabbing murder of Gator's partner by Ole Munch feels endless, drawing out the sense that something terrible is going to happen before delivering on it."
