= Blanket (Fargo) =

- Fargo episode
- Episode no.: Season 5 Episode 8
- Directed by: Sylvain White
- Written by: Noah Hawley; Thomas Bezucha
- Cinematography by: Daryl Hartwell
- Editing by: Skip Macdonald
- Production code: XFO05008
- Original air date: January 2, 2024
- Running time: 46 minutes

Guest appearances
- Lukas Gage as Lars Olmstead; Rebecca Liddiard as Karen Tillman; Erik Ermantrout as Pace; Conrad Coates as Bowman

Episode chronology
← Previous "Linda"	Next → "The Useless Hand"
- Fargo season 5

"Blanket" is the eighth episode of the fifth season of the American anthology black comedy–crime drama television series Fargo. It is the 49th overall episode of the series and was written by series creator Noah Hawley and co-executive producer Thomas Bezucha, and directed by Sylvain White. It originally aired on FX on January 2, 2024.

The season is set in Minnesota and North Dakota in the fall of 2019, and follows Dorothy "Dot" Lyon, a seemingly typical Midwestern housewife living in Scandia, Minnesota, whose mysterious past comes back to haunt her after she lands in hot water with the authorities. One of those authorities is North Dakota Sheriff Roy Tillman, who has been searching for Dot for a long time. In the episode, Roy takes Dot to his farm, while Witt asks Danish for help.

According to Nielsen Media Research, the episode was seen by an estimated 0.461 million household viewers and gained a 0.09 ratings share among adults aged 18–49. The episode received extremely positive reviews from critics, who praised the performances (particularly Juno Temple, Jon Hamm and Dave Foley), debate sequence and the fight at the barn.

== Plot ==
Danish (Dave Foley) examines a ledger book of debtors in North Dakota, selecting three people. He brings them to a local courthouse and has all three petition to change their name to the same name. At the hospital, Roy (Jon Hamm) forces a recovering Dot (Juno Temple) to sign a release form, intimidating the receptionist into ignoring her warnings by threatening to send her brother back to prison. Witt (Lamorne Morris) arrives at the scene and notices Dot's warnings. Despite Witt's insistence that he can help, Dot willingly leaves with Roy before the conflict escalates.

Dot is restrained in Roy's barn. Her pleas to be released in order to return to Scotty (Sienna King) are dismissed by Roy, causing her to promise that she will kill him. Roy leaves for an election debate, while Karen (Rebecca Liddiard) gives Dot a bed and slaps her for insulting her. Indira (Richa Moorjani) returns home early after being informed of Dot's release by Witt, wanting to change her clothing. However, she finds that Lars (Lukas Gage) has been having an affair with another woman. Fed up, she scolds him for his uselessness, warning him to be gone before she returns home. As she leaves, she discovers that her car is in the process of being repossessed. She later meets with Lorraine (Jennifer Jason Leigh) and accepts her job offer, informing her of Dot's location in the process.

Roy arrives at the debate, where he is surprised to find the three men Danish had gotten name changes for on stage, all going by the name "Roy Tillman" and dressed identically to him. Roy is unable to focus, as the candidates repeat all of his actions to the amusement of the audience. Roy storms out, punching the moderator and a reporter in the process. Back at the barn, Gator (Joe Keery) questions Dot over what she told the FBI, but she claims she did not say anything. Still believing her dream to have been real, Dot tells Gator that his mother, Linda, has made it to safety and offers to escape with him. Gator calls her a liar. Dot explains that he is a failure in his father's eyes, as he was not named Roy like his ancestors previously were, and how Roy described him as being a "lizard" as a newborn, causing him to storm out in anger and shame.

At the main gate of the ranch, Gator is confronted by Witt and threatens to kill him if he ever returns. Gator then leaves, unaware that Munch (Sam Spruell) is in the backseat. Witt notices Danish filling up at a gas station; he warns him that Dot is being held at the ranch and that he must do something, as Witt currently lacks the authority. A humiliated Roy returns to the ranch, and at Karen's spiteful persuasion, he violently attacks Dot in the barn. Dot fights back, trying but failing to stab him with a handmade weapon she secretly made. After Dot defiantly tells him that she'll escape again and find Linda, Roy implies that he murdered Linda and threatens to kill her as well.

Both are interrupted by Roy's foreman, Bowman, who informs him of Danish's arrival, news of which delights Dot. Roy meets with Danish in his office, who mocks his debate performance, adding that he is going to lose the election and will likely face assault charges. Danish offers to use his power to make the bad press disappear and get him re-elected, but only if Dot is released. In response, Roy pulls out a gun and shoots Danish, killing him. Dot is horrified to see through her window as Roy's henchmen bury Danish's corpse inside a well next to a windmill. Dot cries alone, as the windmill is the same location in her dream where she found Linda's postcard, implying that she subconsciously knows Linda's body is buried there.

== Production ==
=== Development ===
In December 2023, it was reported that the eighth episode of the season would be titled "Blanket", and was to be written by series creator Noah Hawley and co-executive producer Thomas Bezucha, and directed by Sylvain White. This was Hawley's 41st writing credit, Bezucha's first writing credit, and White's fourth directing credit.

=== Writing ===
Noah Hawley explained that Danish's actions represented guilt in the character. He said, "He said he was her lawyer, and then he acted against her interests, and he has carried this debt around. And so when he's given the opportunity to make it right, he goes to Roy's to try to get her back." He explained that his death was the result of the belief that rich people avoid problems with money, and that Roy's actions represented "the physical dominance versus brain dominance." He considered it a tragedy, but very consistent with the idea of the series, as it covers "the story of decent people who are in over their heads, and sometimes they win, and sometimes you're so far in over your head, you have no idea what you're walking into. And unfortunately, Danish doesn't walk out of that room."

Dave Foley said that he viewed Danish as an over-confident person, believing that he had power over the situations, ignoring that Lorraine was actually the person in charge. He said, "When he sees Roy's gun, in my mind, Danish is just disbelieving, because usually people are afraid of him. He's like, “No, people are afraid of me! This isn't gonna happen! He's not gonna do this.” Right up until the moments the shots are fired, he still believes he has a fearsome presence."

=== Filming ===
Juno Temple said that the fight felt "scary" when she received the script for the episode. While she was scared over the reality of the situation, she said that she loved how Dot never gave up fighting. To film the scene, the set was closed and a therapist was brought in for the cast and crew if needed. She said, "because people who I was working closely with have talked about experiences that they'd been through, it ended up being unbelievably respectfully done."

== Reception ==
=== Viewers ===
In its original American broadcast, "Blanket" was seen by an estimated 0.461 million household viewers and gained a 0.09 ratings share among adults aged 18–49, according to Nielsen Media Research. This means that 0.09 percent of all households with televisions watched the episode. This was a 14% increase in viewership from the previous episode, which was watched by 0.576 million viewers with a 0.08 in the 18-49 demographics.

=== Critical reviews ===
"Blanket" received extremely positive reviews from critics. Tom Philip of The A.V. Club gave the episode a "B" grade and wrote, "Fargo lets these awful moments breathe, foregoing grandiose storytelling for a moment and simply laying out the truth of the Sheriff's brutality. Seeing him played for such a fool at the debate feels like years ago. When it's one-on-one in a cold, dark room, he consumes the light and air, an absolute monster."

Alan Sepinwall wrote, "I'll miss Danish, particularly because Dave Foley was giving the exact same performance he would have in a Kids in the Hall sketch about a smug lawyer. But between Danish's death, Dot continuing to plot an escape attempt, Witt knowing where Dot is, and Ole Munch appearing in the back of Gator's car, things are converging very effectively for the season's final two episodes." Keith Phipps of Vulture gave the episode a 4 star rating out of 5 and wrote, "Dave Foley has quietly delivered one of this season's most entertaining performances with his understated work as Danish Graves, fixer to the Lyon family. But until this episode it's never been quite clear how much freedom he has in his scheming."

Scott Tobias of The New York Times wrote, "The final shot of Dot peering out a small, broken window on the ranch, fully awake to Roy's capabilities, introduces a genuine fear that we haven't yet seen from her. 'You don't have a plan, do you?', she asked him earlier. She intended it as a rhetorical taunt, but perhaps now she realizes that his not having a plan is a terrifying proposition. He will assert his authority over her. He hasn't planned anything after that." Sean T. Collins of Decider wrote, "In its eighth installment, Fargo Season 5 fields a very early candidate for best episode of the year — an hour of television that alternately had me laughing so hard my family left the room, clapping so hard I actually hurt my hands, and wracked with dread and disgust strong enough to leave me wondering if I could stand to see Jon Hamm's hateful face for one more second. Any hour of TV that can do all that is a good fucking hour of TV, that's for sure."

=== Accolades ===
TVLine named Juno Temple as the "Performer of the Week" for the week of January 6, 2024, for her performance in the episode. The site wrote, "Let's be honest: This week's Fargo was tough to watch. With brutal scenes of physical and psychological abuse, we wouldn't blame you if you covered your eyes or looked away at times. But if you did, we hope you didn't miss any of Juno Temple's performance. She's been terrific all season long as Minnesota housewife Dot Lyon, and this week, she just about broke our hearts as Dot used every last ounce of her strength to stand up to violent bully Roy Tillman."
