= The Tragedy of the Commons (Fargo) =

- Fargo episode
- Episode no.: Season 5 Episode 1
- Directed by: Noah Hawley
- Written by: Noah Hawley
- Cinematography by: Dana Gonzales
- Editing by: Regis Kimble
- Production code: XFO05001
- Original air date: November 21, 2023
- Running time: 56 minutes

Guest appearances
- Lukas Gage as Lars Olmstead; Kudjo Fiakpui as Jerome; James Madge as Mick Thigpen; Jan Bos as Wink Lyon; Devon Bostick as Donald Ireland; Rebecca Liddiard as Karen Tillman; Conrad Coates as Bowman; Sally Bishop as Brandy; Erik Ermantrout as Pace; Stephen Joffe as Lemley; Brent Gill as Photographer

Episode chronology
← Previous "Storia Americana"	Next → "Trials and Tribulations"
- Fargo (season 5)

"The Tragedy of the Commons" is the season premiere of the fifth season of the American anthology black comedy–crime drama television series Fargo. It is the 42nd overall episode of the series and was written and directed by series creator Noah Hawley. It originally aired on FX on November 21, 2023, airing back-to-back with the follow-up episode, "Trials and Tribulations".

The season is set in Minnesota and North Dakota in the fall of 2019, and follows Dorothy "Dot" Lyon, a seemingly typical Midwestern housewife living in Scandia, Minnesota, whose mysterious past comes back to haunt her after she lands in hot water with the authorities. One of those authorities is North Dakota Sheriff Roy Tillman, who has been searching for Dot for a long time.

According to Nielsen Media Research, the episode was seen by an estimated 0.566 million household viewers and gained a 0.12 ratings share among adults aged 18–49. The episode received extremely positive reviews from critics, who praised the performances, writing, new storylines and tension.

== Plot ==
In Scandia, Minnesota in 2019, a middle school committee meeting descends into violent chaos. A mother, Dorothy "Dot" Lyon (Juno Temple) starts leaving with her daughter, Scotty (Sienna King). On the way, Dot accidentally tasers a police officer, causing her to get arrested. Deputy Indira Olmstead (Richa Moorjani) takes her to the police station, where she is placed in a cell until her husband Wayne (David Rysdahl) bails her out. During this, Dot is haunted by the image of a man (Jon Hamm) in a barn.

Dot, Wayne and Scotty visit Wayne's wealthy mother, Lorraine (Jennifer Jason Leigh), who owns the largest debt collection agency in the U.S. They pose for a Christmas portrait, in which Lorraine forces them to display rifles. The following day, Dot is home alone when two masked men, Ole Munch (Sam Spruell) and Donald Ireland (Devon Bostick), enter the house. She hides in her bedroom, and manages to burn Ireland's mask, but slips as she escapes and falls down the stairs. As the two intruders check on her, Dot attacks and wounds Munch with an ice skate. Unable to escape, she is taken. Wayne and Scotty arrive later and call Indira to investigate the scene, concluding that a kidnapping took place. Wayne asks Lorraine to pay any potential ransom demands, which she reluctantly accepts.

Munch and Ireland drive Dot outside Beulah, North Dakota, only to be stopped by state troopers. As they prepare to talk with the troopers, Dot simply leaves the car and runs off. The kidnappers kill one of the troopers, while the other, Deputy Witt Farr (Lamorne Morris), escapes. Dot arrives at a gas station, just ahead of Witt, and enters. Outside, Witt is shot and fails to hit Munch and Ireland in the darkness. He locks himself inside with Dot and the store clerk, releasing her bound hands just as the lights go out. Dot hides in a hallway with two ice bags, realizing that one of the men is hiding in the restroom. Ireland charges outside the stall, only to be hit by Dot with a bag, and he falls back on the toilet, breaking his skull. Munch enters the gas station, only to be knocked unconscious by Dot. After she tends Witt's wound, she takes Munch's rifle, finding that he has left. As police sirens are heard, Dot flees the scene.

Wayne puts Scotty in her bed and proceeds to sleep in his study room. He is awakened by a noise in the kitchen, discovering Dot preparing Bisquick pancakes for Scotty. Dot evades most of Wayne's questions and downplays the kidnapping by claiming she went barefoot to walk, concerning Wayne. She proceeds to continue working on the pancake mix.

== Production ==
=== Development ===
In October 2023, it was reported that the first episode of the season would be titled "The Tragedy of the Commons", and was to be written and directed by series creator Noah Hawley. This was Hawley's 35th writing credit, and fifth directing credit. The title refers to the concept of tragedy of the commons by Garrett Hardin.

=== Writing ===
For the opening scene, Noah Hawley wanted to explore the idea of the "Minnesota nice", implying that Minnesota residents are unusually courteous, reserved, and mild-mannered compared to people from other states. He said, "To define the term Minnesota Nice and then open with this school board brawl, it felt like both a good joke, but also now you're completely oriented. Then when you find Dot in the middle of this crowd, she's the only one who's not engaged in some kind of 'nobody's listening to me' aggression. You go, ‘Okay, so she is the one decent person left who still thinks that people shouldn't act like this toward each other.’ It tells you a lot very quickly in a series of images."

=== Filming ===
The episode includes references to the 1996 film, such as the kidnapping scene and the state trooper confrontation. Hawley said, "I must say, after 41 hours in Fargo, it was kind of amazing to be behind the camera and filming a scene from the movie. It raises the hairs on the back of your neck to be standing on some of those sets and feeling like I'm in the movie."

== Reception ==
=== Viewers ===
In its original American broadcast, "The Tragedy of the Commons" was seen by an estimated 0.566 million household viewers and gained a 0.12 ratings share among adults aged 18–49, according to Nielsen Media Research. This means that 0.12 percent of all households with televisions watched the episode. This was a 34% decrease in viewership from the previous episode, which was watched by 0.85 million viewers with a 0.2 in the 18-49 demographics.

=== Critical reviews ===
"The Tragedy of the Commons" received positive reviews from critics. Tom Philip of The A.V. Club gave the episode a "B+" grade and wrote, "I'll admit I was a little surprised to find out there would be a fifth season, but if it continues to be as good as this two-episode season premiere, I'm extremely down for another adventure in the snowy Midwest."

Keith Phipps of Vulture gave the episode a 4 star rating out of 5 and wrote, "With that, another season commences. It's an intriguing one so far, one that raises a bunch of questions." Alec Bojalad of Den of Geek wrote, "Fargo season 5 is rightfully being hailed as a return to form for the Noah Hawley-created series after an imperfect fourth season that delved far back (perhaps too far back) into America's equally imperfect past. Based on this two-episode premiere, it’s not hard to see why season 5 is seen as a welcome new direction for the show. This is as close-to-the-present day as the franchise has ever allowed itself to be."

Scott Tobias of The New York Times wrote, "The series's creator, Noah Hawley, who wrote and directed this first hour, has been oddly undiscerning about his quotations throughout the show's run. But Fargo is most effective when it pivots unexpectedly off the Coens rather than merely tipping its hat." Sean T. Collins of Decider wrote, "Usually, on this show, Hawley has an unsubtleness that really works for humor, horror, satire, hardboiled crime, and several other applications. That's why I'm not litigating the validity of the project anymore; the show has earned respect. This episode is no exception." Felicia Nickens of TV Obsessive wrote, "Dorothy is a stay at home mom, who cooks pancakes in the morning and likes to knit. She's part of the PTO and has been fighting to expand the murder mystery selection of books at the middle school. To anyone looking in, it appears to be a normal, boring, family. As is learned by the end of Episode 1, this is far from the case."
