= Far Cry (TV series) =

Upcoming American television series

- Genre: Anthology
- Created by: Noah Hawley; Rob Mac
- Based on: Far Cry by Ubisoft
- Showrunner: Noah Hawley
- Starring: Rob Mac; Lizzy Caplan; Steve Buscemi; Brendan Gleeson; Jennifer Jason Leigh; Hamish Linklater; Sam Spruell; Jamie Demetriou
- Country of origin: United States
- Original language: English

Production
- Executive producers: Rob Mac; Noah Hawley; Emilia Serrano; Nick Frenkel; Jackie Cohn; John Campisi; Gérard Guillemot; Margaret Boykin; Austin Dill
- Production companies: 26 Keys Productions; 3 Arts Entertainment; More Better Productions; Ubisoft Film & Television; FX Productions

Original release
- Network: FX

Far Cry is an upcoming American television series created by Noah Hawley and Rob Mac for FX. Based on the video game franchise published by Ubisoft, the series is planned as an anthology, with each season featuring a different setting and cast of characters. Mac is set to star in the first season and executive produce the series with Hawley.

== Cast ==
- Rob Mac
- Lizzy Caplan
- Steve Buscemi
- Brendan Gleeson
- Jennifer Jason Leigh
- Hamish Linklater
- Sam Spruell
- Jamie Demetriou

== Production ==
=== Development ===
In August 2025, Ubisoft briefly published and then removed a news post announcing a television adaptation of Far Cry for FX. Coverage of the removed post said the project involved Noah Hawley and Rob Mac, with Hawley serving as showrunner, and described the series as an anthology.

On November 24, 2025, FX placed a series order for the adaptation, with Hawley and Mac attached as creators and executive producers. The series is produced by FX Productions, with production companies associated with Hawley, Mac, 3 Arts Entertainment, and Ubisoft Film & Television also involved.

=== Casting ===
In November 2025, Rob Mac was announced to star in the series. In June and July 2026, Lizzy Caplan and Steve Buscemi were confirmed to have joined the cast. In September, Brendan Gleeson, Jennifer Jason Leigh, Hamish Linklater, Sam Spruell and Jamie Demetriou were announced as cast members of the series.

=== Writing and filming ===
In April 2026, Hawley said the series would not directly adapt any of the released Far Cry games. He described the franchise's anthology structure as central to his approach, with each season intended to tell a different story about people placed in increasingly lawless situations.

As of April 2026, filming was expected to begin later in 2026, after production began on the second season of Hawley's Alien: Earth. Hawley said he planned to direct the first two episodes of Far Cry and work with co-showrunners while managing both series. Principal photography began in September 2026, in Spain.

== Release ==
The series is expected to stream on Hulu in the United States and on Disney+ internationally.
