= Fargo season 5 =

2023–24 season of American crime anthology TV series

Fargo
- Season 5
- Promotional poster
- Starring: Juno Temple; Jennifer Jason Leigh; David Rysdahl; Joe Keery; Lamorne Morris; Richa Moorjani; Sam Spruell; Sienna King; Dave Foley; Jon Hamm
- No. of episodes: 10

Release
- Original network: FX
- Original release: November 21, 2023 – January 16, 2024

Season chronology
- ← Previous; Season 4

The fifth season of the American black comedy crime drama television series Fargo, billed as Fargo: Year Five and Fargo: Installment 5, aired on FX from November 21, 2023 to January 6, 2024, totaling ten episodes. The series is an anthology about violent crime in the American Midwest, with each season acting as a self-contained story within the show's shared continuity. Set in the fall of 2019, Year Five follows Dorothy "Dot" Lyon, a seemingly typical Midwestern housewife living in Scandia, Minnesota, whose mysterious past comes back to haunt her after she inadvertently lands herself in hot water with the authorities.

The season was produced by FX Productions and MGM Television, with Noah Hawley serving as showrunner. It is the first of the series to have no connection to either a previous season or the 1996 film, though it makes several homages to the latter. Originally scheduled to premiere in September 2023, it was delayed due to the 2023 Hollywood labor disputes. It stars Juno Temple, Jennifer Jason Leigh, David Rysdahl, Joe Keery, Lamorne Morris, Richa Moorjani, Sam Spruell, Sienna King, Dave Foley, and Jon Hamm.

Fargo: Year Five received strong reviews, with many critics calling it a return to form for the show and favorably comparing it to the first two seasons. It was nominated for three Golden Globe Awards for Best Limited or Anthology Series or Television Film and Best Actor and Actress in a Miniseries or Television Film for Hamm and Temple, respectively.

== Cast ==
=== Main ===
- Juno Temple as Dorothy "Dot" Lyon / Nadine Tillman (née Bump), a seemingly ordinary housewife from Scandia, Minnesota, who is haunted by her past after accidentally coming to the attention of authorities following a middle school board meeting gone wrong
- Jennifer Jason Leigh as Lorraine Lyon, Dot's wealthy, arrogant mother-in-law; known as the "Queen of Debt", she is the billionaire CEO of "Redemption Services", the largest debt collection agency in the U.S.
- David Rysdahl as Wayne Lyon, Dot's loving and respectful, yet often passive husband, who owns a small Kia car dealership
- Joe Keery as Gator Tillman, Roy's brash son, deputy and protege who is eager to prove his worth to his father
- Lamorne Morris as Whitley "Witt" Farr, a North Dakota state trooper who encounters Dot during her escape from kidnappers and becomes embroiled in the ensuing investigation
- Richa Moorjani as Indira Olmstead, a Scandia deputy with financial troubles who investigates Dot's kidnapping and later becomes suspicious of her story
- Sam Spruell as Ole Munch / Bryn Glas, a mysterious criminal-for-hire who holds vendettas against both Dot and Tillman, and who is also a 500-year-old sin-eater originally from Wales
- Dave Foley as Danish Graves, Lorraine's in-house attorney and loyal right-hand man
- Sienna King as Scotty Lyon, Dot and Wayne's tomboy 9-year-old daughter
- Jon Hamm as Roy Tillman, a religious conservative rancher and corrupt constitutional sheriff of Stark County, North Dakota who is also Dot's abusive ex-husband from 11 years prior

=== Recurring ===
- Lukas Gage as Lars Olmstead, Indira's feckless spendthrift husband, an aspiring pro golfer
- Nick Gomez as Agent Tony Joaquin, a Fargo-based FBI agent who is investigating Roy's abuse of power
- Jessica Pohly as Agent Hildred Meyer, Joaquin's partner at the FBI
- Rebecca Liddiard as Karen Tillman, Roy's current (and third) wife
- Michael Copeman as Odin Little, Karen's father and a local militia leader
- Kudjo Fiakpui as Jerome Pugh, Lorraine's bodyguard
- Jan Bos as Wink Lyon, Lorraine's husband and Wayne's father, a mild-mannered alcoholic with an interest in historic military engagements
- James Madge as Mick Thigpen, the attorney general of Minnesota, who is a friend of Lorraine
- Conrad Coates as Bowman, foreman of the Tillman Ranch and Roy's right-hand man
- Sally Bishop as Brandy, an associate of Gator
- Erik Ermantrout as Pace, an associate of Gator
- Stephen Joffe as Lemley, an associate of Gator
- Clare Coulter as Irma, an elderly woman whose house Munch installs himself in
- Steven McCarthy as Jordan Seymore, an angry, foul-mouthed cancer patient at Walter Mondale Medical Center
- Paul McGillion as Captain Owen Muscavage, Indira's boss at the Scandia Police Department

=== Guest ===
- Devon Bostick as Donald "Donny" Ireland, a freelance criminal Munch hires for assistance on a job
- Brendan Fletcher as Gun World Clerk
- Jason Schwartzman as Narrator ("The Tiger")
- Kari Matchett as Linda Tillman, Roy's first wife and Gator's mother

== Episodes ==
No. overall	No. in season	Title	Directed by	Written by	Original release date	Prod. code	U.S. viewers (millions)
42	1	"The Tragedy of the Commons"	Noah Hawley	Noah Hawley	November 21, 2023	XFO05001	0.566
In 2019, Scandia housewife Dorothy "Dot" Lyon is arrested by deputy Indira Olmstead when she mistakenly tasers an officer during a riot at her daughter Scotty's school board meeting. Bailed out by her husband Wayne, she is kidnapped by criminals Ole Munch and Donald Ireland after a long struggle that ends with all three being injured. Wayne's wealthy mother Lorraine, who runs a debt collection agency, agrees to pay a potential ransom. While driving Dot into North Dakota, Munch and Ireland are pulled over by state troopers. Dot flees and Munch kills a trooper and shoots his partner, Officer Witt Farr, who hides in the same gas station as Dot. She rigs the store with traps, killing Ireland and injuring Munch, who escapes while she treats Witt's wound. She flees before Witt can learn her name and walks home, where she claims to a confounded Wayne that she was not kidnapped, despite evidence to the contrary.
43	2	"Trials and Tribulations"	Noah Hawley	Noah Hawley	November 21, 2023	XFO05002	0.311
Roy Tillman, the constitutional sheriff of Stark County explains his biblically-based view of the world to a young man before he has one of his deputies beat him up for abusing his wife "unnecessarily". Roy meets with Munch, who he hired to kidnap Dot, and explains that Dot is his wife Nadine, who disappeared eleven years ago. When Munch demands triple his payment for not being made aware of her skills, Roy's son (and deputy) Gator Tillman attempts to execute him, but Munch instead kills two of Roy's men and escapes. FBI agents Joaquin and Meyer press Roy to enforce federal laws locally despite his distaste of them. Gator visits a recovering Witt to probe for information on Dot, running into Indira seeking the same information. Gator deletes a picture of Dot from Indira's phone to prevent Witt from identifying her. Believing Dot faked the kidnapping to extort her, Lorraine tries to pay her to leave Wayne and threatens legal action when she refuses. With Scotty's help, Dot booby-traps the entire house to deter intruders, explaining it to Wayne as an affordable "security system". When Gator and a deputy stop at the same gas station that was previously shot up, Munch kills the deputy and pins a note written in blood to the man's chest with a hunting knife demanding payment.
44	3	"The Paradox of Intermediate Transactions"	Donald Murphy	Noah Hawley	November 28, 2023	XFO05003	0.494
Roy instructs Gator to cover up the deputy's death as an accident and to look for clues into Munch's whereabouts. Dot makes plans for Halloween, switching around the street signs in the neighborhood and designing "zombie killer" costumes for her and Scotty with homemade weapons and bulletproof vests. An elderly woman named Irma discovers Munch living in her house but appears indifferent and allows him to stay. A flashback to Wales 500 years ago depicts a funeral where a peasant named Bryn Glas — the immortal Munch — is paid to consume a meal representing the dead man's sins. Dot and Wayne attempt to buy guns, but their plans are foiled by a mandatory one week waiting period. Witt confronts Gator at the police station after seeing Gator steal evidence related to Ireland. Roy instructs Gator to kidnap Dot on Halloween night when lots of people are milling around wearing masks. Munch performs a ritual in a shed at Roy's farm, covering himself in goat's blood and chanting in Latin. After trick or treating Dot notices a suspicious van outside her house, the occupants wearing masks. Munch, dripping blood, enters Roy's house where Roy's current wife and two young daughters are sleeping.
45	4	"Insolubilia"	Donald Murphy	Noah Hawley	December 5, 2023	XFO05004	0.424
Gator and his crew invade the Lyon house wearing Halloween masks but Dot recognizes Gator. She manages to fend off the assailants, but in the process, Wayne is nearly fatally electrocuted from one of her traps, which sets the room on fire. Her family and Gator's crew manage to escape before the fire department arrives. Roy approaches his house and discovers the deputy guarding it has been killed. He follows Munch's footprints to his daughters' bedroom, finding the children untouched, but an arcane symbol drawn on the wall in blood. With Wayne recovering in the hospital, Witt and Indira show up to question Dot, but are rebuffed by Lorraine's attorney Danish Graves. FBI agents Joaquin and Meyer suspect Roy of providing weapons to a local right-wing militia led by his father-in-law, Odin Little, but their boss, fearing retaliation from the militiamen, refuses to support an investigation. Roy visits the house of the couple he had earlier counseled about domestic violence. Seeing more bruises on the wife, Roy goads the husband into pulling a gun, only to fire his own gun first and kill him. Roy tells Gator to frame the dead husband for Munch's crimes at the gas station to stop the police investigation.
46	5	"The Tiger"	Dana Gonzales	Noah Hawley	December 12, 2023	XFO05005	0.451
Dot and Scotty temporarily stay at Lorraine's fortified house. Lorraine and Danish try to have Dot institutionalized, but at the hospital, she attacks the guards and escapes. Lorraine meets with banker Vivian Dugger and pressures him to sell his failing bank to her. Roy visits Lorraine looking for Dot, but Lorraine rebuffs him and offers to help fund his re-election campaign to get rid of him. Indira arrives at Lorraine's compound to inform her that Dot has escaped, but Roy overhears and orders his henchmen to kidnap Wayne. Dot narrowly evades Roy's men at the hospital and overhears that they are there for Wayne. She hides a recovering Wayne in the bathroom of his ward while duping the men into kidnapping a different patient. Joaquin and Meyer arrive at the hospital to question Dot. She stonewalls them before slipping away and sneaking back to Lorraine's compound to retrieve Scotty and take her to Indira's house. Dot admits to Indira that her ex-husband is after her, and asks Indira to take care of Scotty for a few days while she attends to other business.
47	6	"The Tender Trap"	Dana Gonzales	Noah Hawley & Bob DeLaurentis	December 19, 2023	XFO05006	0.457
Roy confronts Dugger outside a strip club, coercing him into not selling his bank to Lorraine. Back at the Tillman ranch, Gator's men torture the cancer patient they had mistakenly kidnapped, but Roy realizes they got the wrong man and kills him. The FBI agents interview Wayne at the hospital but get nowhere. They later meet with Indira and tell her their plan to use Dot to uncover Roy's illegal activities. While Roy pays off Munch, Gator plants a tracking device on Munch's car without his father's knowledge. When Indira finds her feckless husband Lars has left Scotty by herself, she takes her back to Lorraine's house and gives the latter a file detailing Dorothy's abuse by Roy. Lorraine offers Indira a job running her security team along with a remedy to her mounting debt. Lorraine reports Dugger's embezzlement of his bank's funds to the government, effectively ruining him. She then examines the file Indira had given her and discovers how severely Dot had been abused by Roy.
48	7	"Linda"	Sylvain White	Noah Hawley & April Shih	December 26, 2023	XFO05007	0.576
Irma's son, Kevin, discovers Munch at her house and demands he pay rent; Munch pays him in cash, only to murder him moments later after witnessing him mistreating his mother. Gator follows the tracker on Munch's car to Irma's house and snipes at his silhouette through a window, unaware it is the corpse of Kevin. He discovers Munch's payment money in his car and steals it; Irma confronts him, but he pushes her, causing her to fall and fatally hit her head. Gator escapes before Munch discovers the body. Dot, meanwhile, drives a long distance and stops at a roadside diner. She then retrieves a buried postcard for a "Camp Utopia", which turns out to be a women's shelter run by Roy's first wife and Gator's mother, Linda. Dot blames Linda for luring her into Roy's clutches so she could escape him, but asks her to testify on behalf of Roy's crimes. Linda agrees, but first has Dot tell her personal story to the camp using puppets, explaining how she was taken in by the Tillman family at age 15 and was abused by Roy. Dot eventually wakes up at the diner, realizing that the whole Camp Utopia experience was a dream. She walks out of the door, but is knocked unconscious when a careening semi-trailer smashes into the parking lot; she awakens in the hospital only to find Roy at her bedside.
49	8	"Blanket"	Sylvain White	Noah Hawley & Thomas Bezucha	January 2, 2024	XFO05008	0.461
Danish selects three North Dakota men from the Lyon book of debtors, and has them all change their names to "Roy Tillman". Indira discovers her husband in bed with another woman and kicks him out. At the hospital, Witt sees Roy forcing Dot to come with him, but is outnumbered by Roy's men and is unable to help her. Roy takes Dot back to his ranch and restrains her with chains in a barn. He then goes to his debate for reelection as sheriff, only to find the three other Roy Tillmans onstage to sabotage his speech. Roy storms out of the debate, striking the female moderator in the face on the way out. Gator checks in on Dot, who claims Linda is alive, but an angered Gator drives away, unaware Munch is hiding in his car. Witt sees Danish at a gas station and tells him about Dot's captivity. Roy returns from the debate embarrassed and enraged; his wife Karen convinces him to take his anger out on Dot rather than on her. Dot, however, fights back and attempts to kill Roy, but their fight is interrupted upon Danish's arrival at the compound. Danish offers to fix Roy's election in exchange for Dot's return, but Roy kills him. Dot witnesses Roy's men burying Danish's body in a pit underneath a windmill that echos a location in her dream, and realizes that Roy had killed Linda and buried her in the same pit.
50	9	"The Useless Hand"	Thomas Bezucha	Noah Hawley	January 9, 2024	XFO05009	0.517
Munch takes a kidnapped Gator to a remote ice fishing cabin and cuts out his eyes as punishment for killing his innocent landlady. Indira, now Lorraine's head of security, traces Danish's cellphone to the Tillman ranch. Lorraine calls in a favor from the President to deploy an armored FBI and state police force to the compound; Roy, meanwhile, summons his father-in-law's militia to defend the ranch. Dot manages to escape through the floor of the barn amidst the chaos and sneaks into the farmhouse, managing to call Wayne before being confronted by Karen Tillman. Dot overpowers Karen and takes her phone and gun. While outside searching for Dot, Roy is approached by Munch, who accuses him of betraying him and leaves the disfigured Gator with him. Deeming Gator to be "useless" now, Roy abandons him. Dot hides in the pit where Danish's body was dumped, but is discovered by three of Roy's men, only for Munch to kill them. He sets Dot free and gives her a gun before disappearing.
51	10	"Bisquik"	Thomas Bezucha	Noah Hawley	January 16, 2024	XFO05010	0.601
Witt joins an FBI assault team covertly breaching the ranch's perimeter to rescue Dot. Roy gets into a fight with his father-in-law over Dot's escape and murders him; Karen witnesses this and flees. Roy chases her, only to be confronted by Dot, who shoots him in the abdomen. Before she can shoot again, the FBI team arrives to retrieve her and arrest Karen while a wounded Roy flees. Witt pursues him into the ranch's dugout, but Roy overpowers and fatally stabs him. Roy attempts to escape via a tunnel in the dugout, but is arrested by the FBI, who were alerted to his location by Gator. Dot and Gator reconcile before she returns home and reunites with her family. A year later, Lorraine visits Roy in prison and tells him she is helping the other prisoners repay their debts in return for tormenting Roy in prison. Munch makes a surprise visit to the Lyon home seeking retribution against Dot for maiming him during their first encounter, but Dot challenges his conception of debt, and offers him a meal if he will help cook. She teaches him to make biscuits, and he joins the family for dinner. He tells the family of the cursed existence he has lived ever since consuming another man's sins centuries ago. Dot assures him he can be free by eating a meal made with love and given freely, offering him a biscuit. After a moment of hesitation, Munch eats it and smiles cathartically.

== Production ==
=== Development ===
On the day of the fourth season's finale, "Storia Americana", series creator Noah Hawley was questioned about a potential fifth season. He said, "The danger is always that you're going to stay at the dance a little too long. So I have to put a lot of it in place in my head and really make sure that it's worthy of joining these 41 hours. I don't want to try and make another one unless I think, 'Oh, we have to make this one. It's the best one yet.'" By March 2021, Hawley said "I'll get to it in the next year."

In February 2022, FX officially renewed the series for a fifth season. Hawley said that the season would be more "comedic" in tone, saying "It's always a balance between how dramatic versus comedic it is, and this is the more comedic end of the spectrum. I really love it."

=== Casting ===
In June 2022, Juno Temple, Jon Hamm and Jennifer Jason Leigh were confirmed as main cast members for the season. In August 2022, Joe Keery, Lamorne Morris and Richa Moorjani joined the series.

In October 2022, David Rysdahl, Sam Spruell, Jessica Pohly and Nick Gomez joined the season. The following month, Dave Foley was confirmed to appear, while Lukas Gage also joined in January 2023.

=== Filming ===
Filming for the season started on October 17, 2022 in Calgary, Alberta, Canada.

== Release ==
=== Marketing ===
On October 25, 2023, FX Networks released the season's full trailer.

=== Broadcast ===
The season premiered on FX on November 21, 2023, with the first two episodes, with the rest debuting weekly. It was originally scheduled to premiere in September 2023, but was delayed due to the 2023 Hollywood labor disputes.

== Reception ==
=== Critical response ===
On Rotten Tomatoes, the season has an approval rating of 93% based on 54 reviews, with an average rating of 8.5/10. The website's critics consensus reads, "A back-to-basics caper populated by the likes of a mesmerizing Juno Temple and a thick slice of Hamm, Fargo's fifth season is a superb return to peak form." On Metacritic, the season has a weighted average score of 80 out of 100, based on 34 critics, indicating "generally favorable" reviews.

=== Accolades ===
Awards	Category	Nominee(s)	Result	Ref.
Art Directors Guild Awards	Excellence in Production Design for a One-Hour Contemporary Single-Camera Series	Trevor Smith (for "Trials and Tribulations")	Nominated	
Critics' Choice Television Awards	Best Movie/Miniseries	Fargo	Nominated	
Critics' Choice Television Awards	Best Actress in a Movie/Miniseries	Juno Temple	Nominated	
Golden Globe Awards	Best Limited or Anthology Series or Television Film	Fargo	Nominated	
Golden Globe Awards	Best Actor – Miniseries or Television Film	Jon Hamm	Nominated	
Golden Globe Awards	Best Actress – Miniseries or Television Film	Juno Temple	Nominated	
Primetime Emmy Awards	Outstanding Limited or Anthology Series	Noah Hawley, Warren Littlefield, Joel Coen, Ethan Coen, Steve Stark, Kim Todd, Thomas Bezucha, Bob DeLaurentis, April Shih, Caitlin Jackson, Regis Kimble, Dana Gonzales, and Leslie Cowan	Nominated	
Primetime Emmy Awards	Outstanding Lead Actor in a Limited or Anthology Series or Movie	Jon Hamm	Nominated	
Primetime Emmy Awards	Outstanding Lead Actress in a Limited or Anthology Series or Movie	Juno Temple	Nominated	
Primetime Emmy Awards	Outstanding Supporting Actor in a Limited or Anthology Series or Movie	Lamorne Morris (for "Blanket")	Won	
Primetime Emmy Awards	Outstanding Directing for a Limited or Anthology Series or Movie	Noah Hawley (for "The Tragedy of the Commons")	Nominated	
Primetime Emmy Awards	Outstanding Writing for a Limited or Anthology Series or Movie	Noah Hawley (for "The Tragedy of the Commons")	Nominated	
Primetime Creative Arts Emmy Awards	Outstanding Casting for a Limited or Anthology Series or Movie	Rachel Tenner, Jackie Lind, Stephanie Gorin, and Rhonda Fisekci	Nominated	
Primetime Creative Arts Emmy Awards	Outstanding Cinematography for a Limited or Anthology Series or Movie	Dana Gonzales (for "The Tragedy of the Commons")	Nominated	
Primetime Creative Arts Emmy Awards	Outstanding Contemporary Costumes for a Limited or Anthology Series or Movie	Carol Case, Charl Boettger, and Michelle Carr (for "Insolubilia")	Nominated	
Primetime Creative Arts Emmy Awards	Outstanding Music Composition for a Limited or Anthology Series, Movie or Special (Original Dramatic Score)	Jeff Russo (for "Blanket")	Nominated	
Primetime Creative Arts Emmy Awards	Outstanding Music Supervision	Maggie Phillips (for "The Tragedy of the Commons")	Nominated	
Primetime Creative Arts Emmy Awards	Outstanding Picture Editing for a Limited or Anthology Series or Movie	Regis Kimble (for "The Tragedy of the Commons")	Nominated	
Primetime Creative Arts Emmy Awards	Outstanding Production Design for a Narrative Contemporary Program (One Hour or More)	Trevor Smith, Cathy Cowan, and Amber Humphries (for "Trials and Tribulations")	Nominated	
Primetime Creative Arts Emmy Awards	Outstanding Sound Editing for a Limited or Anthology Series, Movie or Special	Nick Forshager, Joe Bracciale, Dustin Harris, Alex Bullick, Brad Bakelmun, Ben Schor, Jason Charbonneau, and Stefan Fraticelli (for "Trials and Tribulations")	Nominated	
Primetime Creative Arts Emmy Awards	Outstanding Sound Mixing for a Limited or Anthology Series or Movie	Martin Lee, Kirk Lynds, Michael Playfair, and Michael Perfitt (for "Trials and Tribulations")	Nominated	
Producers Guild of America Awards	Outstanding Producer of Limited or Anthology Series Television	Fargo	Nominated	
Screen Actors Guild Awards	Outstanding Performance by a Male Actor in a Miniseries or Television Movie	Jon Hamm	Nominated	
Television Critics Association Awards	Outstanding Achievement in Drama	Fargo	Nominated	
Television Critics Association Awards	Outstanding Achievement in Movies, Miniseries and Specials	Fargo	Nominated	
Television Critics Association Awards	Individual Achievement in Drama	Juno Temple	Nominated	
Writers Guild of America Awards	Limited Series	Thomas Bezucha, Bob DeLaurentis, Noah Hawley, and April Shih	Nominated	
