= Snatchers =

- Directed by: Stephen Cedars; Benji Kleiman
- Written by: Stephen Cedars; Benji Kleiman; Scott Yacyshyn
- Produced by: Eric Fisher; Scott Hinckley; Elli Legerski; Paul Young
- Starring: Mary Nepi; Gabrielle Elyse
- Cinematography: Nate Hurtsellers
- Edited by: Stephen Cedars; Benji Kleiman
- Music by: Christopher Doucet
- Production company: MAKE GOOD Content
- Distributed by: Stage 13
- Release date: March 10, 2019 (SXSW)
- Running time: 96 minutes
- Country: United States
- Language: English

Snatchers is a 2019 American comedy horror film directed by Stephen Cedars and Benji Kleiman. It stars Mary Nepi and Gabrielle Elyse. The film had its world premiere at the 2019 South by Southwest on March 10, 2019. Variety included it on the "11 Best Movies of the 2019 SXSW Film Festival" list.

Snatchers was initially a short film made in 2015 as a proof-of-concept featuring the same cast. Ultimately, the short was edited into the final film. It was initially distributed as a micro-series, premiering at 2017 Sundance Film Festival, before being edited into a feature. Its stars described it as "Mean Girls meets Alien."

== Plot ==
A high school student Sara loses her virginity to her boyfriend Skyler. The next day, she wakes up and finds herself pregnant. She goes to a clinic with her friend Hayley. There, she gives birth to an alien creature. The creature then attacks and kills everyone in the clinic. Sara and Hayley escape but find that Sara is still pregnant with another creature. They go to Dave, who runs a farm and specializes in animal reproduction. He plans to give an uterotonic to Sara, but they are interrupted in the process and arrested by officer Oscar Ruiz, who had been searching for Sara and Hayley to enquire about events in the clinic. He takes them to the police station and calls Sara's mother. But the police station is attacked by the creature to which Sara gave birth earlier and kills everyone in the station.

Sara gives birth to the second alien and the first alien controlling Sara's mother takes it. Sara and Hayley go to Skyler's house, where Sara realizes that Skyler is hypersexual for some reason and demands explanation from him. But Skyler runs away from the house. Sara and Hayley, with the help of Hayley's brother, hack Skyler's computer and find that Skyler has broken an ancient Mayan doll while on a trip to Mexico which released a gas that he inhaled. They realize that the creature is using human beings to procreate and has gone to Sara's friend Kiana's party. They go to the party and fight with the monsters and kill them and save Sara's mother.

In the post-credits scene, a bound Skyler is taken somewhere by a couple of government agents.

== Cast ==
- Mary Nepi as Sara Steinberg
- Gabrielle Elyse as Hayley Chamberlain
- Austin Fryberger as Skyler Cole
- JJ Nolan as Kate Steinberg
- Nick Gomez as Oscar Ruiz
- Ashley Argota as Kiana
- Amy Arburn as Blair
- Amy Landecker as Cheryl
- Rich Fulcher as Dave

== Release ==
The film had its world premiere at the 2019 South by Southwest on March 10, 2019. It was also screened at the 2019 Sitges Film Festival. It was released on digital platforms on January 7, 2020. It was released on DVD and Blu-ray on February 18, 2020.

== Reception ==
On review aggregator website Rotten Tomatoes, the film holds an approval rating of 100% based on 16 reviews, with an average rating of 7.4/10. The website's critical consensus reads, "Snatchers' practical effects and strong writing come together to create a sci-fi comedy that's fun, frenetic, and at times, freakin' crazy (in the best way)."

Rafael Motamayor of Dread Central gave the film 3 out of 5 stars, describing it as "a weird, silly, goofy and fun movie that riffs on enough tropes and movies to keep you entertained." John DeFore of The Hollywood Reporter called it a "horror-comedy PSA about the perils of teen sex and the importance of staying true to one's real friends." Dennis Harvey of Variety praised "the comic esprit of the players, snappy visual and editorial presentation, and the screenplay's Clueless-like fountain of entertainingly over-the-top youth slang." Alex McLevy of The A.V. Club wrote: "While Snatchers is an above-average entry in the horror-comedy realm, it's not good enough to enter any sort of canon of proudly retro campy-splatter flicks."

Variety included it on the "11 Best Movies of the 2019 SXSW Film Festival" list.
