= Louise Armstrong =

American writer and feminist

- Born: March 17, 1937
- Died: August 10, 2008 (aged 71)
- Occupations: Author, activist
- Spouse: Tom Hawley
- Children: 2 (Noah Hawley and Alexi Hawley)

Louise Armstrong (March 17, 1937 – August 10, 2008) was a published author of numerous adult and children's books. She joined the women's movement in New York City in 1972 and began researching father-daughter incest. A feminist and activist, Armstrong spoke widely for two decades in the United States, Canada, and England on the subjects of child abuse, violence against women, incest, family violence, and sexual abuse. Her book Kiss Daddy Goodnight, published by Pocket Books in 1978, is a groundbreaking work on incest.

In addition, she wrote many articles, keynoted numerous feminist conferences, and spoke at universities and to groups nationally and internationally on these issues. She wrote for magazines, including Woman's Day, Connecticut Magazine, and On the Issues.

Armstrong chaired a committee on family violence for the National Women's Health Network (1979–84) and was on the faculty of the Institute of Children's Literature (1980–87). She was an affiliate of the International Coalition Against Trafficking in Women and Children and was on the advisory board of the Center for the Study of Psychiatry, the advisory board of the National Center for Protective Parents, and the editorial board of Women and Therapy.

She was predeceased by her husband, businessman Tom Hawley. They had twin sons: Emmy Award-winning television producer and filmmaker Noah Hawley; and Alexi Hawley, who is also a television writer and is best known as the creator of the series State of Affairs, The Rookie, and The Recruit.

== Published works ==
=== Adult books ===
- Kiss Daddy Goodnight: A Speak-out on Incest (Pocket Books, 1978)
- Saving the Big-Deal Baby, illustrated by Jack Hearne (E. P. Dutton, 1980)
- The Home Front: Notes from the Family War Zone (McGraw-Hill, 1983)
- Kiss Daddy Goodnight: Ten Years Later (Pocket Books, 1987)
- Solomon Says: A Speakout on Foster Care (Pocket Books, 1989)
- And They Call It Help: The Psychiatric Policing of America's Children (Addison-Wesley, 1993)
- Rocking the Cradle of Sexual Politics: What Happened When Women Said Incest (Addison-Wesley, 1994; The Women's Press, 1996)
- Of 'Sluts' and 'Bastards': A Feminist Decodes the Child Welfare Debate (Common Courage Press, 1996)

=== Children's books ===
- A Child's Guide to Freud, illustrated by Whitney Darrow, Jr. (Simon & Schuster, 1963)
- The Thump, Blam, Bump Mystery, illustrated by Ray Cruz (Walker, 1975)
- How to Turn Lemons into Money: A Child's Guide to Economics, illustrated by Bill Basso (Harcourt Brace Jovanovich, 1975)
- How to Turn Up into Down into Up: A Child's Guide to Inflation, Depression, and Economic Recovery, illustrated by Bill Basso (HBJ, 1978)
- How to Turn War into Peace: A Child's Guide to Conflict Resolution, illustrated by Bill Basso (HBJ, 1979)
- Arthur Gets What He Spills, illustrated by Syd Hoff (HBJ, 1979)

=== Collected works ===
Contributed chapters in the following collected works, both academic and trade:

- The Sexual Liberals and the Attack on Feminism (eds: Dorchen Leidholdt and Janice G. Raymond; Pergamon Press, 1990)
- Radically Speaking: Feminism Reclaimed (eds: Diane Bell and Renate Klein; Zed Books, 1996)
- Feminist Foremothers in Women's Studies, Psychology, Mental Health (eds: Phyllis Chesler, Esther D. Rothblum, Ellen Cole; Haworth Press, 1995)
- Home Truths About Child Sexual Abuse: Influencing Policy and Practice (ed: Catherine Itzin; London: Routledge, 2000)
