= Nick Gomez (actor) =

American actor

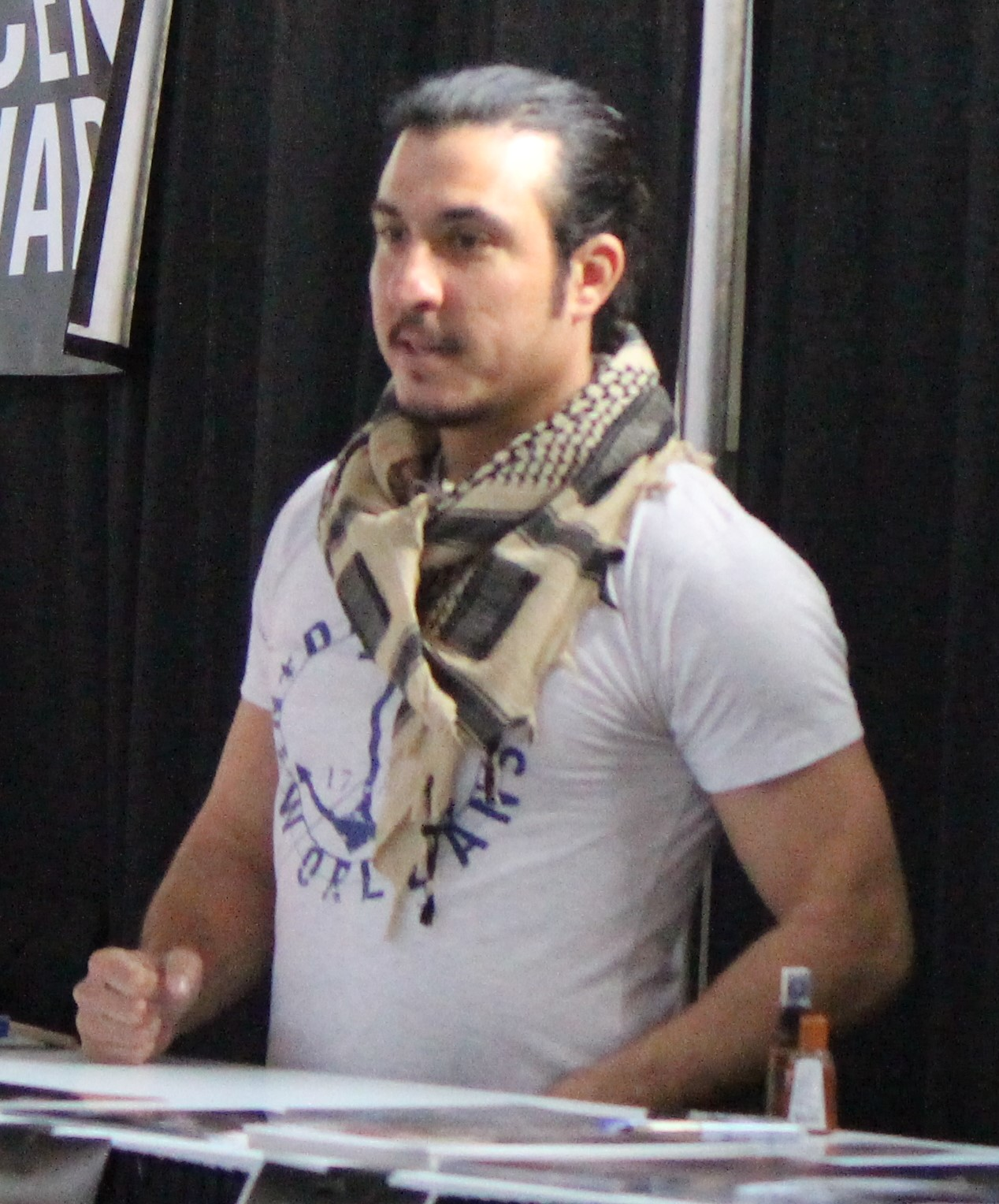
- Gomez in February 2015
- Born: October 2, 1978 (age 47); Honolulu, Hawaii, United States
- Other names: Nicholas Sean Gomez, Nicholas Gomez
- Occupation: Actor
- Years active: 1989–present

Nick Gomez (born October 2, 1978) is an American actor best known for his guest appearances on television shows such as The Walking Dead (2012), Dexter (2013), and The Red Road (2014–15).

== Career ==
Gomez began acting as a child. There was a film set near his home town that he would frequently visit, and directors would often use him as an extra. He had his first speaking role in Young Guns II, speaking one word opposite Kiefer Sutherland.

Gomez has had an array of supporting roles in film and television. His most notable television roles are Jay on Treme, Tomas on The Walking Dead, Javier 'El Sapo' Guzman on Dexter, and Frank Morgan on The Red Road.

Gomez's film work includes G.I. Joe: Retaliation, The Starving Games, and Day of Reckoning.

== Filmography ==
=== Film ===
Film
Year	Title	Role	Notes
1989	The Cellar	Boy with Plane	
1990	Young Guns II	Fernando	Credited as Nicholas Sean Gomez
1992	Aces: Iron Eagle III	Juan	Credited as Nick Sean Gomez
1995	The Prophecy	Jason	Credited as Nicholas Gomez
1995	Powder	N/A	Stunts
2000	South of Heaven, West of Hell	N/A	Production assistant
2001	Power Rangers Time Force: Photo Finis	Assistant Director	Direct-to-video
2002	Wanted: Soulful Energy Xchange	Cuatehmoc	Video short
2005	Shooting Gallery	College Boy	Direct-to-video
2008	Hotel California	Davey	
2008	A Man Called Trouble	Trouble Kincaid	Short film
2009	12 Rounds	Samuel	
2009	Bad Lieutenant: Port of Call New Orleans	Evaristo Chavez	
2009	The Ninth Step	Terry	Short film
2009	Taken by Jessica	Randy	Short film
2010	Vampires Suck	Jacob's Pack #1	
2010	Trust Bob	Lenny	Short film
2011	The Chaperone	Nick	
2011	Drive Angry	Fucking Middle	
2012	Act of Valor	Christo's Thug	
2012	The Iceman	Alvaro	
2012	Looper	Dale	
2012	Paranormal Abduction	Therapist	
2012	Simple	Shady	
2012	She's Sassy	Abner	Short film
2013	Simple Act	Robber	Short film
2013	Hours	Lobo	
2013	G.I. Joe: Retaliation	N/A	Utility stunts; uncredited
2013	Swallow	Uncle Jacky	Short film
2013	The Starving Games	Na'vi Guy	
2014	Lily	Lily	Short film
2014	The Amateur	Julio	
2015	Don't Call Me Crazy	Dr. Marcel Espinosa	Short film Writer
2015	Runaway Hearts	Dill	
2016	Blood Sombrero	Lucifer	
2016	Sniper: Ghost Shooter	Miguel Cervantes	
2016	Day of Reckoning	Garrett	
2016	Domain	Houston	
2016	Don't Call Me Crazy	Dr. Marcel Espinosa	Short film Writer
2017	The Raking	Bartender	
2017	King and Pawns	Ray	
2017	The Delivery	Sean Kincaid	Short film
2018	The Nanny	Officer Frank	
2019	Snatchers	Oscar Ruiz	
2019	Wake Up	The Boyfriend	Video short
2019	Midwater	Short film	
2019	Jumanji: The Next Level	Oasis Drunk	
2020	The Step Daddy	Det. Robert Bridges	
2020	Not So Wild West	Wyatt Ford	
2021	The Richard Dilemma	Richard	Writer; Producer
2024	The Vortex	The Tech	
TBA	The Lonely Types	Mark	Short film Post-production
TBA	The Recovery	Jeff	Short film Filming; Writer; Producer
TBA	Potential	Jack	Announced

=== Television ===
Television
Year	Title	Role	Notes
1991	The Young Riders	Matthew	Episode: "Judgment Day"
1991	Living a Lie	Juan	TV movie
1993	Shadowhunter	Young Boy	TV movie
2001	Law & Order	Latin Thug	Episode: "Sunday in the Park with Jorge"
2001	The Jennie Project	Theater Attendant	TV movie Credited as Nicholas Gomez
2001	Power Rangers Time Force	Assistant Director	Episode: "Movie Madness: Part 1"
2001	The Invisible Man	Benton	Episode: "The Choice"
2002	Hunter: Return to Justice	Leader	TV movie
2002	The Chronicle	Lyle	Credited as Nicholas Gomez; Episode: "The Stepford Cheerleaders"
2002–2003	Dawson's Creek	Broker Nick / Co-worker #1 / Co-worker #4	5 episodes
2005	Faith of My Fathers	Becker	TV movie
2010	The Pregnancy Pact	Clerk	TV movie
2010	Mandrake	Santiago Zavala	TV movie
2010	Monsterwolf	Holter Ex Surveyor	TV movie
2010–2011	Treme	Jay	5 episodes
2011	Ricochet	Tony Esteban	TV movie
2012	The Walking Dead	Tomas	2 episodes
2013	Dexter	Javier "El Sapo" Guzman	2 episodes
2013	Nashville	Santiago	Episode: "It Must Be You"
2014	Major Crimes	Manuel Escobedo	Episode: "Personal Day"
2014–2015	The Red Road	Frank Morgan	8 episodes
2015	Longmire	Dwight Brisco	Episode: "Help Wanted"
2015	NCIS	Nicky Jones	Episode: "Lockdown"
2016	Bosch	Nick Riley	6 episodes
2016	General Hospital	Marcos Santos	2 episodes
2017	The Thundermans	Duffy	Episode: "Max to the Future"
2017	SEAL Team	Val	Episode: "The Exchange"
2017-2018	Snatchers	Oscar Ruiz	17 episodes
2020	Criminal Minds	Orlando Gaines	Episode: "Face Off"
2021	Sunset Cowboys	Hector Vasquez	
2022	She-Hulk: Attorney at Law	Wrecker	3 episodes
2023	Fargo	Tony Joaquin	Recurring role
2023 - 2024	The Rookie	Matt Dominques / Mad Dog	2 episodes: "Death Sentence" and "Punch Card"
2024	Hightown	Swayzee	3 episodes

=== Web ===
Web
Year	Title	Role	Notes
2011	Wendy	The Gardener	2 episodes
