= Noah Hawley =

American screenwriter and producer (born 1967)

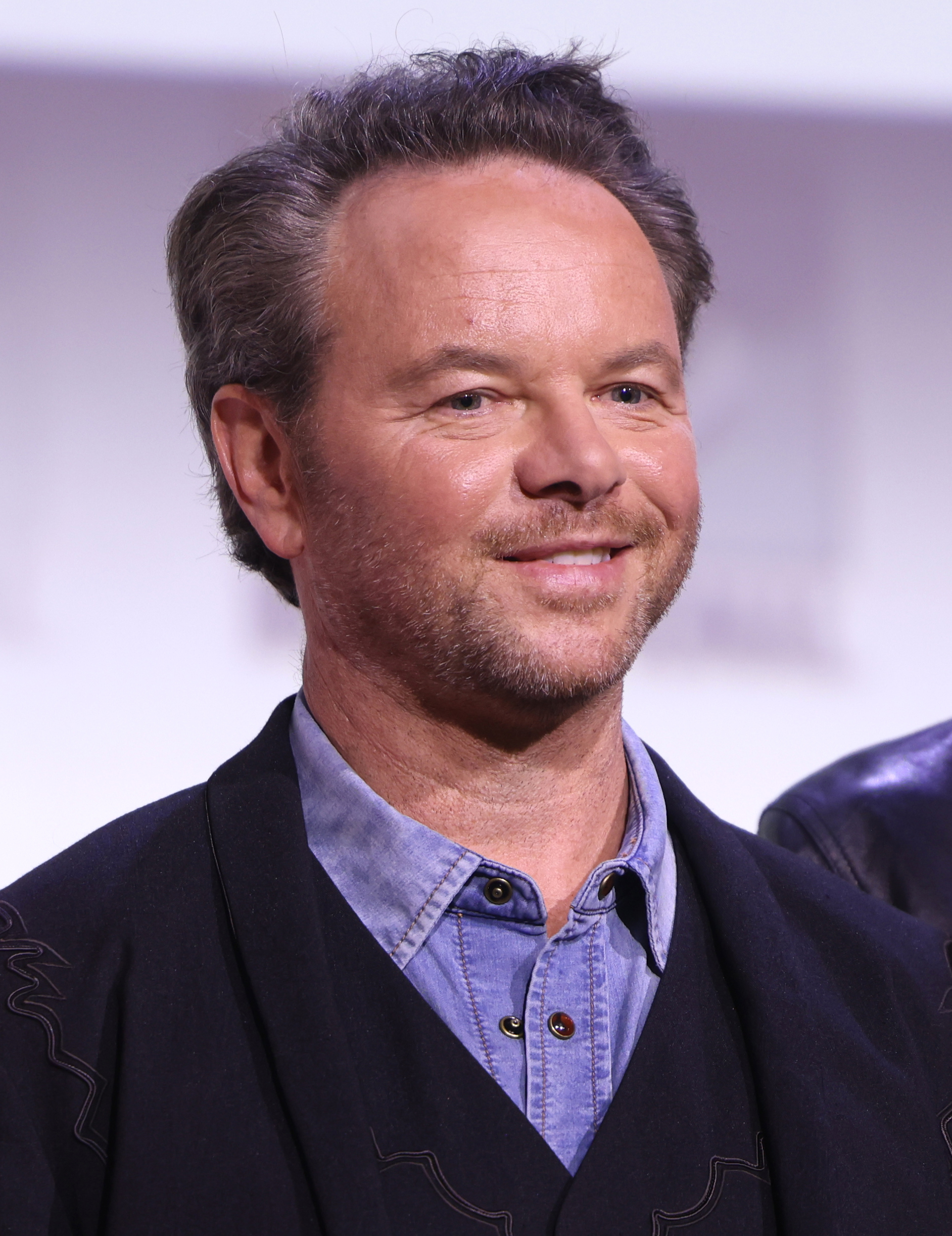
- Hawley at the 2025 San Diego Comic-Con
- Born: May 10, 1967 (age 59); New York City, U.S.
- Education: Sarah Lawrence College
- Occupations: Screenwriter; director; producer; author; singer
- Years active: 2005–present
- Spouse: Kyle Hawley
- Children: 2
- Relatives: Louise Armstrong (mother), Alexi Hawley (twin brother)

Noah Hawley (born May 10, 1967) is an American screenwriter, television producer, author and singer. He is best known for creating, chiefly writing and often directing the FX television series Fargo (2014–present), Legion (2017–2019) and Alien: Earth (2025–present). He also worked on the series Bones (2005–2008), The Unusuals (2009), and My Generation (2010).

Hawley wrote the film The Alibi (2006) and wrote and directed the film Lucy in the Sky (2019). He has also written six novels and contributed to the soundtracks of Fargo, Legion and Alien: Earth by singing covers of popular songs produced by composer Jeff Russo, a frequent collaborator on Hawley's projects. In November 2025, along with the renewal of Alien: Earth, it was announced Hawley and Rob McElhenney were creating a television series based on the Far Cry video games for FX.

== Early life, family and education ==
Hawley was born in New York City in 1967, the son of non-fiction writer and feminist activist Louise Armstrong (1937–2008) and businessman Tom Hawley. His maternal grandmother was a playwright. He has a twin brother, Alexi, who is also a television writer whose most prominent works include the series State of Affairs, The Rookie, and The Recruit.

In 1989, Hawley graduated from Sarah Lawrence College with a degree in political science.

== Career ==
Hawley worked as a paralegal and in computer programming at law firms. He worked for The Legal Aid Society in New York City, dealing with cases involving child abuse and neglect, a topic on which his mother had written ground-breaking books. He later moved to San Francisco, California.

=== Books ===
Hawley has published six novels: A Conspiracy of Tall Men (1998), Other People's Weddings (2004), The Punch (2008), The Good Father (2012), Before the Fall (2016), and Anthem (2022). He also published the non-fiction work Fargo: This Is a True Story (2019).

=== Television ===
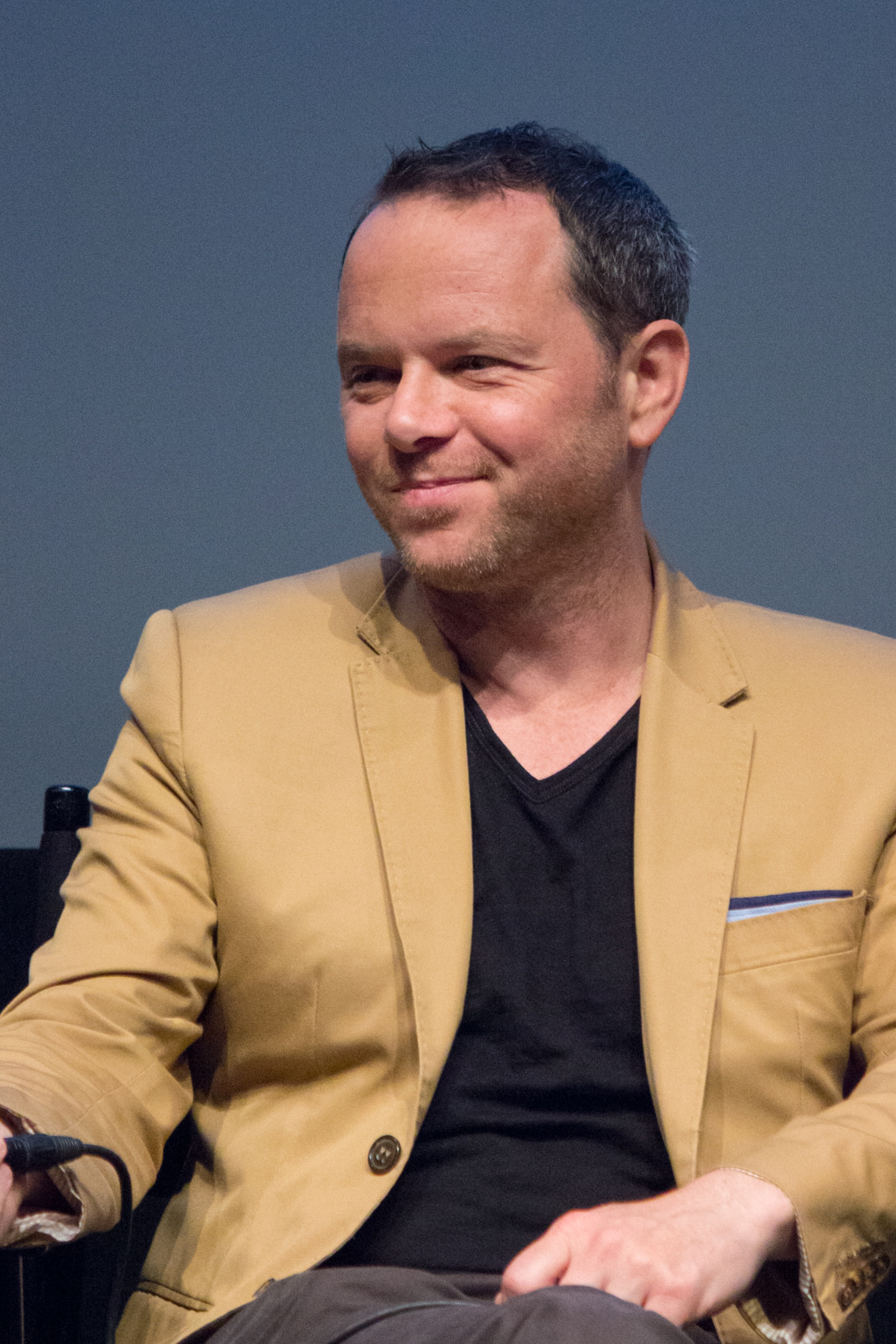
Hawley in June 2014

Hawley was a writer and producer on the first three seasons of Bones (2005–2008). He was also the creator and an executive producer of The Unusuals (2009) and My Generation (2010).

Hawley is the creator, primary writer, and executive producer of the FX anthology series Fargo (2014–present), based on the Coen brothers' 1996 film of the same name. In 2014, Fargo won the Primetime Emmy Award for Outstanding Miniseries, along with 17 additional nominations at the 66th Primetime Emmy Awards. In total, the series has been nominated for 113 awards since its premiere, winning 32.

In December 2015, Hawley extended his production deal with FX. He wrote and served as executive producer and showrunner for Legion (2017–2019), a series based on the Marvel comic book character.

Hawley is the creator of Alien: Earth, a TV series based on the film franchise, on which he is a writer, director, and producer and showrunner. It premiered on FX on August 12, 2025.

In November 2025, it was announced Hawley was working on an adaptation of the video game series Far Cry.

=== Film ===
Hawley wrote the original screenplay for the film The Alibi (2006).

In September 2014, Hawley signed a deal with Universal Pictures to script an untitled project for their then-upcoming Dark Universe. Sony Pictures has acquired the rights to Hawley's novel, Before the Fall, with him writing the screenplay. In 2016, his 26 Keys production company signed a deal with 20th Century Fox to do films.

On July 20, 2017, Hawley announced at Comic Con that he was writing and directing a Doctor Doom movie with 20th Century Fox. However, the project was shelved following Disney's acquisition of 21st Century Fox.

In 2019, he made his feature film directorial debut with Lucy in the Sky, a drama film starring Natalie Portman as an astronaut, for Fox Searchlight.

In November 2019, it was announced that Hawley would be writing and directing the fourth installment in the rebooted Star Trek franchise. He finished the script in September 2020. It would feature a new crew, although set in the same universe. In December 2025, Hawley said that he is still in contact with producer David Ellison on making his own Star Trek film.

== Personal life ==
Hawley and his wife, Kyle, have two children together. They split their time between Los Angeles and Austin, Texas.

== Filmography ==
=== Film ===
Year	Title	Director	Writer	Producer
2006	The Alibi	No	Yes	No
2019	Lucy in the Sky	Yes	Yes	Yes

=== Television ===
Year	Title	Director	Writer	Executive Producer	Creator	Notes
2005–2008	Bones	No	Yes	Yes	No	Writer (6 episodes); Also co-producer (14 episodes)
2009	The Unusuals	No	Yes	Yes	Yes	3 episodes Also composer
2010	My Generation	No	Yes	Yes	Developer	2 episodes
2014–2024	Fargo	Yes	Yes	Yes	Yes	Director (6 episodes); Writer (48 episodes)
2017–2019	Legion	Yes	Yes	Yes	Yes	Director (3 episodes); Writer (19 episodes)
2025–present	Alien: Earth	Yes	Yes	Yes	Yes	Director (2 episodes); Writer (8 episodes)

== Awards and nominations ==
Primetime Emmy Awards

Year	Category	Title	Result	Notes	Ref.
2014	Outstanding Limited Series	Fargo	Won	For season 1	
2016	Outstanding Limited Series	Fargo	Nominated	For season 2	
2017	Outstanding Limited Series	Fargo	Nominated	For season 3	
2024	Outstanding Limited Series	Fargo	Nominated	For season 5	
2016	Outstanding Directing for a Limited Series or Movie	Fargo	Nominated	For episode "Before the Law"	
2017	Outstanding Directing for a Limited Series or Movie	Fargo	Nominated	For episode "The Law of Vacant Places"	
2024	Outstanding Directing for a Limited Series or Movie	Fargo	Nominated	For episode "The Tragedy of the Commons"	
2014	Outstanding Writing for a Limited Series or Movie	Fargo	Nominated	For episode "The Crocodile's Dilemma"	
2016	Outstanding Writing for a Limited Series or Movie	Fargo	Nominated	For episode "Palindrome"	
2017	Outstanding Writing for a Limited Series or Movie	Fargo	Nominated	For episode "The Law of Vacant Places"	
2024	Outstanding Writing for a Limited Series or Movie	Fargo	Nominated	For episode "The Tragedy of the Commons"	

Producers Guild of America Awards

Year	Category	Title	Result	Notes	Ref.
2014	Best Long-Form Television	Fargo	Won	For season 1	
2015	Best Long-Form Television	Fargo	Won	For season 2	
2017	Best Long-Form Television	Fargo	Nominated	For season 4	
2023	Best Limited Series Television	Fargo	Nominated	For season 5	

Writers Guild of America Awards

Year	Category	Title	Result	Notes	Ref.
2015	Long Form – Adaptation	Fargo	Won	For season 1	
2017	Long Form – Adaptation	Fargo	Nominated	For season 4	
2023	Limited Series	Fargo	Nominated	For season 5	

== Published works ==
- Hawley, Noah (1998). A Conspiracy of Tall Men. Harmony. ISBN 9780609602805.
- Hawley, Noah (2004). Other People's Weddings. St. Martin's Press. ISBN 9780312322731.
- Hawley, Noah (2008). The Punch. Chronicle Books. ISBN 9780811864299.
- Hawley, Noah (2012). The Good Father. Doubleday. ISBN 9780385535533.
- Hawley, Noah (2016). Before the Fall. Grand Central. ISBN 9781455561780.
- Hawley, Noah (2022). Anthem. Grand Central Publishing. ISBN 9781538711514.
