= Jessica Pohly =

American actress

Jessica Pohly is an actress who first came to attention on the stage before landing her breakthrough on-screen role in 2016 as bank robber Pepper in Pee-wee's Big Holiday.

== Early life ==
Pohly was born and raised in New York City. She began her career touring with the American Shakespeare Center and was also a member of the Atlantic Theater Company. She originated roles in several plays written by Pulitzer Prize winner Adam Rapp.

== Career ==
After writing, producing, and starring in Alternate Sides, a 2012 short film about the trials and tribulations of parking in New York City, Pohly ventured into television with cameos in multiple sitcoms in 2013 and 2014, including Welcome to the Family, Super Fun Night, and Modern Family.

Pohly appeared in three consecutive 2014 short films: Theme Song Rebel, a dystopian musical comedy; Somebody, a satire on social network apps; and Meet the Zillas, a camp farce about a wedding-obsessed town.

Following a minor role in 2015 as Wanda in police procedural Stalker, Pohly was cast as Pepper, the ringleader of a bank-robbing gang, in the 2016 revival of Paul Reubens' famous alter-ego, Pee-wee's Big Holiday. She has also portrayed the Dark Haired Whisperer in 2020 in The Walking Dead, in addition to portraying Agent Meyer in 2023-2024 in the fifth season of Fargo. She also starred in, wrote and produced a short film called The Arrangement.

In addition to her work in film and television, Pohly has appeared in S.W.A.T. and Rake, and voiced characters in The Really Loud House. A multidisciplinary performer, she studied modern dance in college and trained at Théâtre de l'Ange Fou in London.
