= Sam Spruell =

British actor (born 1977)

- Born: 9 October 1977 (age 49); Southwark, London, England
- Occupation: Actor
- Years active: 2002–present
- Children: 1

Sam Spruell (born 9 October 1977) is a British actor.

== Early life ==
Born in Southwark, London, Spruell studied at Hull University before turning to acting. His mother is actress Linda Broughton. He is married to costume designer Natalie Ward and they share a son named Sidney.

== Career ==
=== Theatre ===
He made his stage debut with the Royal National Theatre. He has appeared in The Caretaker (at Trafalgar Studios); Pornography (Tricycle); The Alchemist and The Life of Galileo (the National); King Lear (Sheffield Crucible); Othello (Royal Exchange); A Midsummer Night's Dream, They Shoot Horses, Don't They?, and Pippin, (Bloomsbury Theatre); and elsewhere.

=== Film ===
Spruell's first screen appearance came in Kathryn Bigelow's submarine drama K-19: The Widowmaker in 2002. His film credits include To Kill a King (2003); London to Brighton (2006); Elizabeth: The Golden Age (2007); The Hurt Locker (2008); Defiance (2008); and others. He played hit man Jack "The Hat" McVitie in the 2015 film Legend, about the story of the Kray twins. In 2012, Spruell had a starring role in the film Snow White & the Huntsman, as brother to the Evil Queen that was played by Charlize Theron. In October 2025, Spruell was announced to star alongside Honor Swinton Byrne and Jessica Madsen in the feature film Tidepools.

=== Television ===
His television roles include the recurring cameo of Jason Belling in Spooks (2007 in Episode 6.9 and 2004 in Project Friendly Fire), and the recurring role of Wilkes in P.O.W. (2003). In March 2013, he appeared in one of the lead roles in the BBC One thriller drama series Mayday. He was cast in the television adaptation of The Last Ship later in the year. In 2015, Spruell played Oleg Malankov, the secondary villain in Taken 3 and then played Owen Lynch in the drama series Luther in episode 1.2. In the thirteenth series of Doctor Who, Spruell played Swarm, one of the main villains of the series.

In 2023, he starred as Ole Munch in the fifth season of the Fargo series, an "immortal hired gun" figure who "exists outside of time and society's rules," a "collection of contrasts". In June 2024, it was announced that Spruell would portray Maekar Targaryen in the series A Knight of the Seven Kingdoms.

== Filmography ==
Key
†	Denotes works that have not yet been released

=== Film ===
Year	Title	Role	Notes	Ref.
2002	K-19: The Widowmaker	Dmitri Nevsky		
2003	To Kill a King	King's guard		
2006	London to Brighton	Stuart Allen		
2006	Venus	Hospital Director		
2007	Tick Tock Lullaby	Steve		
2007	Elizabeth: The Golden Age	Torturer		
2008	The Hurt Locker	Contractor Charlie		
2008	Defiance	Arkady Lubczanski		
2010	Sex & Drugs & Rock & Roll	Kilburns' Drummer		
2012	Snow White & the Huntsman	Finn		
2013	Company of Heroes	Sgt. Matherson	Direct-to-video	
2013	Starred Up	Governor Hayes		
2013	The Counselor	Jamie		
2013	Sixteen	Liam		
2014	The Voices	Dave		
2014	Good People	Jack Witkowski		
2014	Taken 3	Oleg Malankov		
2015	Child 44	Doctor Tyapkin		
2015	Legend	Jack "The Hat" McVitie		
2015	The Martian	NASA Psychologist	Uncredited	
2015	The Lady in the Van	Another Young Man		
2017	Sand Castle	1st Lt. Anthony		
2017	Valerian and the City of a Thousand Planets	General Okto-Bar		
2017	Cowboy Dave	Cowboy Dave	Short	
2018	The World Is Yours	Bruce		
2018	Outlaw King	Aymer de Valence, 2nd Earl of Pembroke		
2019	The Informer	Slewitt		
2021	Locked Down	Martin		
2021	The Amazing Mr. Blunden	Bertie	Television film	
2022	The Hanging Sun	Aaron / Nicholas		
2022	O, Glory!	Thewlis	Short	
2023	The Settlers	Colonel Martin		
2024	Ma famille chérie	William		
2024	Up the Catalogue	Jim Kelly		
2025	The Thing with Feathers	Paul		
2025	H Is for Hawk	Stuart		
2026	Insidious: Out of the Further	Cyrus Lam		
2026	The Dog Stars	John		
TBA	Tidepools †	Yuri	Post-production	

=== Television ===
Year	Title	Role	Notes	Ref.
2003	P.O.W.	Wilkes	6 episodes	
2004, 2007	Spooks	Jason Belling	2 episodes	
2005	The Ghost Squad	Will Surridge	Episode: "One of Us"	
2006	Rosemary & Thyme	Jerome Daniels	Episode: "Seeds of Time"	
2006	Silent Witness	Robbie Sharpe	Episode: "Schism: Part 2"	
2007	HolbyBlue	Clive Bolland	Episode #1.7	
2008	City of Vice	Duke of Newcastle	4 episodes	
2009	Ashes to Ashes	Trevor Riley	Episode #2.6	
2009	The Fixer	Connor O'Dricoll	Episode #2.5	
2010	Foyle's War	Tommy Duggan	Episode: "Killing Time"	
2010	Luther	Owen Lynch	Episode #1.2	
2011	The Runaway	Jim Harvey	5 episodes	
2012	Eternal Law	Marcus	Episode #1.6	
2013	Mayday	Steve Docker	5 episodes	
2014–2015	The Last Ship	Quincy	11 episodes	
2015	Catastrophe	Owen	Episode #1.3	
2015	The Bastard Executioner	Toran Prichard	10 episodes	
2019	I Am...	Barry	Episode: "I Am Nicola"	
2020	Liar	Oliver Graham	6 episodes	
2020	Small Axe: Mangrove	PC Frank Pulley	Episode: "Mangrove"	
2021	The North Water	Cavendish	4 episodes	
2021	Doctor Who	Swarm	5 episodes	
2023–2024	Fargo	Ole Munch	9 episodes	
2023–2024	The Gold	Charlie Miller	3 episodes	
2024	Dune: Prophecy	Horace	2 episodes	
2026	A Knight of the Seven Kingdoms	Prince Maekar "The Anvil" Targaryen	4 episodes	
2026	Dear England	Mike Webster	4 episodes	
TBA	Alien: Earth †	TBA	Filming	
