= Conrad Coates =

British-born Canadian actor and teacher

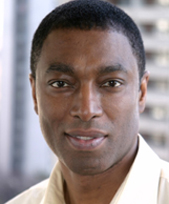
- Born: July 12, 1970 (age 56); London, England
- Other names: C.C, C. Coates
- Occupations: Actor, teacher
- Years active: 1989–present
- Children: 1

Conrad Coates (born July 12, 1970) is a British-born Canadian actor and teacher. He is best known for his roles as Headmaster T. Monk in The Zack Files (2001–2002), as Jimmy Brooks' father in Degrassi: The Next Generation (2004–2008), as Morgan in The Dresden Files (2007), and as Bowman in the fifth season of Fargo (2023–2024).

== Early life ==
Coates was born in London, England, to immigrants from Jamaica. At a young age he moved to Canada, where he was educated. After school, he worked in local and regional theaters and at the Stratford (Shakespeare) Festival.

== Career ==
Since 1989, Coates has acted in theatre, film, television and radio. Performing in more than 40 stage productions across the country, including two seasons at The Stratford Shakespeare Festival, North America's largest classical repertory theatre.

With extensive work in Canadian and American television, his work also expands to include writing, producing, teaching and mentoring.

In 2003, he wrote, produced and directed a short film titled Dakota, and for several years, Coates was a drama teacher for Toronto's multi-discipline "SuiteLife Arts for Youth Program."

He has primarily been cast as bit parts, but has carried supporting character roles in several television series, including Kyle XY, The Zack Files, La Femme Nikita, and These Arms of Mine. He appeared in Percy Jackson & the Olympians: The Lightning Thief as Hephaestus, God of Craft and husband to Aphrodite, Unnatural History as Samuel Tolo and a guest appearance in the Fringe episode "What Lies Below" as Vincent Ames. He has also appeared in Supernatural as one of Crowley's demons in the episode "Caged Heat". Coates appears in Saving Hope as Bryan Travers. He had a recurring role in the third season of the Syfy series Defiance, playing T'evgin, an alien of the Omec race.

As well as commercial, film and television, Coates teaches an acting school under the name Coates and Company.

== Personal life ==
Conrad has at least one daughter whom he delivered himself. He is a professor at Seneca College.

== Filmography ==
=== Film ===
Year	Title	Role	Notes
1991	Deceived	Policeman #2	
1994	Car 54, Where Are You?	DA #2	
1995	Open Season	Fielding Rep #1	
1995	To Die For	Weaselly Guy	
1995	Rude	Rude Caller	
1997	Critical Care	Dr. Miller	
2002	Saint Monica	Calm Man	
2005	Hollywood Flies	Ray	
2005	Saw II	Additional Voice Talent	Voice role
2006	The Sentinel	Agent Hauser	
2007	How She Move	David Green	
2009	Helen	Stephen	
2009	The Death of Alice Blue	Detective McGregor	
2010	Percy Jackson & the Olympians: The Lightning Thief	Hephaestus	
2010	Tron: Legacy	Bartik	
2011	Cell 213	Frank	
2012	This Means War	Smart Consumer Guard 'Hudson'	
2012	Two Hands to Mouth	Ibraahim	
2016	X-Men: Apocalypse	Pentagon General Fields	
2018	Anon	Detective Fuchs	
2018	Welcome to Marwen	Demaryius Johnson	
2019	A Dog's Journey	Big Joe	
2019	Business Ethics	Claude Higgins	
2021	Romance in the Wilds	Stanley Garson	
2023	Simulant	Supervisor Abendjor	
2023	Dream Scenario	Dinner Guest #1	
2023	Totally Killer	Principal Doug Summers	
2023	Christmas in Big Sky Country	Martin Hill	

=== Television ===
Year	Title	Role	Notes
1989	War of the Worlds	Driver	Episode: "Epiphany"
1989	My Secret Identity	Bobby Spillman	Episode: "One on One"
1989	The Campbells	Jim	Episode: "Eyes of Angels"
1990	Counterstrike	Uncredited	2 episodes
1990	The Hitchhiker	Frank	Episode: "Fading Away"
1990	Clarence	Cellblock Cop	TV movie
1991, 1992	Street Legal	Court Clerk / Constable Osborne	2 episodes
1992	Beyond Reality	Dr. Lee / The Waiter	Episode: "Dancing with the Man"
1993	Kung Fu: The Legend Continues	Becker	Episode: "Sunday at Hotel with George"
1993	Trial & Error	Eddie	TV movie
1993	Top Cops	Holmes	Episode: "Louis Scarcella and Steve Chmil/Alan Patton"
1994	E.N.G.	Security Guard	Episode: "Cutting Edge"
1995	TekWar	Dr. Reingold	Episode: "Carlotta's Room"
1997	PSI Factor: Chronicles of the Paranormal	Dr. Bradford	Episode: "Fire Within/Fate"
1998	Earth: Final Conflict	Rev. Billy Mitchell	Episode: "Infection"
1999	Dear America: The Winter of Red Snow	Bill Lee	TV short
1999	Avengers	Lead Synthesoid (voice)	Episode: "Remnants"
2000	Finding Buck McHenry	Hartford Cole	TV movie
2000	Who Killed Atlanta's Children?	Special Agent	TV movie
2000	Hendrix	Black Panther	TV movie
2000	Relic Hunter	Mysterious Local	Episode: "The Legend of The Lost"
2000–2001	These Arms of Mine	Steven Armstrong	5 episodes
2001	Blue Murder	Raymond Spears	Episode: "Out-of Towners: Part 1"
2001	Twice in a Lifetime	Gang Boss	Episode: "Moonshine Over Harlem"
2001	La Femme Nikita	Haled	4 episodes
2001	The Pretender: Island of the Haunted	Adama, triumvirate member	TV movie
2001–2002	The Zack Files	Headmaster T. Monk	Recurring; 14 episodes
2001–2002	Tracker	Councilman Prestin	2 episodes
2002	Scared Silent	Whit Colby	TV movie
2002	Street Time	Philip Leeds	Episode: "Rabid Dawg"
2002	Body & Soul	Dr. Marshall Banks	TV series
2003	Sounder	Preacher #2	TV movie
2003	Word of Honor	Col. Pierce Truscott	TV movie
2004	The Eleventh Hour		Episode: "Georgia"
2004	1-800-Missing	Detective	Episode: "In the Midnight Hour"
2004–2008	Degrassi: The Next Generation	Jermaine Brooks	4 episodes
2005	Hollywood Flies	Ray	TV movie
2005	ReGenesis	Canadian Army Officer	Episode: "The Promise"
2005	This Is Wonderland	Gregory Jarmun	Episode #2.1
2005	Kevin Hill	Morris Wilson	Episode: "A River in Egypt"
2005	Slings & Arrows	Frog Hammer Employee	2 episodes
2006	Between Truth and Lies	Detective Lopez	TV movie
2006	Gospel of Deceit	Neil-Saint Armand	TV movie
2006	Solar Strike	Colonel Alby	TV movie
2006	Earthstorm	Will	TV movie
2006	Mayday	Captain Abate	Episode: "Ocean Landing"
2007	Painkiller Jane	Prosecutor	Episode: "Trial by Fire"
2007	Bionic Woman	Doctor #1	Episodes: "Pilot" & "Unaired Pilot"
2007	Smallville	Keating	Episode: "Bizarro"
2007	Christmas Caper	Clive Henry	TV movie
2007	The Dresden Files	Morgan	Main; 7 episodes
2007–2008	Kyle XY	Julian Ballantine	Recurring; 9 episodes
2007–2009	Da Kink in My Hair	Richard	7 episodes
2008	Reaper	Kenneth	Episode: "The Leak"
2008	Vipers	Lewison	TV movie
2009	Come Dance at My Wedding	Ryan	TV movie
2009	The Good Times Are Killing Me	Norton	TV movie
2009	Skyrunners	Agent Armstrong	TV movie
2010	Fringe	Vincent Ames	Episode: "What Lies Below"
2010	Warehouse 13	Officer Kessman	Episode: "Mild Mannered"
2010	Covert Affairs	Hasaan Waleed	Episode: "In the Light"
2010	Supernatural	Crowley's Demon	Episode: "Caged Heat"
2011	Nikita	President Ungara	Episode: "Girl's Best Friend"
2011	XIII: The Series	Rondeau	Episode: "The Train"
2011	Combat Hospital	Oga Civilian	Episode: "Do No Harm"
2011	Lost Girl	The Black Thorn	Episode: "I Fought the Fae (and the Fae Won)"
2011	Against the Wall	Matt Gibbons	Episode: "Countdown to Meltdown"
2011	Sanctuary	Yusuf	2 episodes
2012	The Listener	Rafiq	Episode: "The Taking"
2012–2013	Saving Hope	Brian	Recurring; 4 episodes
2013	Republic of Doyle	Sheen Barry	Episode: "Identity Crisis"
2013	Murdoch Mysteries	Mission Man	Episode: "Murdoch on the Corner"
2013	Heartland	Sgt. Decker	Episode: "Thread the Needle"
2013	Cracked	Brandon Doerkes	Episode: "Hideaway"
2014	Beauty & the Beast	Captain Bennett	Episode: "Held Hostage"
2014	The Strain	Mike Rivers	2 episodes
2014	Haven	Mr. Simon	Episode: "Mortality"
2015	12 Monkeys	Michael Pratt	Episode: "The Keys"
2015	Good Witch	Zimmerman	2 episodes
2015	Defiance	T'evgin	Season 3
2015	V Morgan is Dead	Alistair Benson	Season 1
2016	Real Detective	Dewayne Lee Harris	Episode: "Vengeance"
2016–2017	Dark Matter	Ruac	2 episodes
2017	Deadly Secrets by the Lake	Lucky Martin	TV movie
2017	Mommy's Prison Secret	Blake Peterson	TV movie; a.k.a. Early Release
2017	Designated Survivor	General Tobias Beckwith	Episode: "Sting of the Tail"
2017	Star Trek: Discovery	Terral / Admiral Terral	4 episodes
2017	Save Me	Captain	Episode: "Possible Anaphylaxis"
2017	The Christmas Cure	Dr. Campbell	TV movie
2017–2018	Cardinal	Coroner Barnhouse	3 episodes
2018	Private Eyes	Hank Falcone	Episode: "Kissing the Canvas"
2018	Jack Ryan	Colonel Robert Phelps	Episode: "The Boy"
2018–2019	Shadowhunters	Detective Dwyer	2 episodes
2019	Ransom	Detective Roger Berks	Episode: "Justice"
2019	Jett	Lieutenant Carter	Episode: "Rosalie"
2019	Escaping the NXVM Cult: A Mother's Fight to Save Her Daughter	Agent Lathan	TV movie
2019	Love by Accident	Cal	TV movie
2022	In the Dark	Graham Stanley	Episode: "Hard Pill to Swallow"
2023	Hudson & Rex	Chip Bellamy	Episode: "Hero by Night"
2023–2024	Fargo	Bowman	Recurring; season 5
2024	Locked in My House	Detective Corali	TV movie

=== Video games ===
Year	Title	Voice role
1998	Resident Evil 2	
2000	Resident Evil – Code: Veronica	Narrator
2021	Far Cry 6	Jorge 'El Tigre' Aguilar
2024	Star Wars Outlaws	Voice
