= Richa Moorjani =

American actress

- Born: California, U.S.
- Education: University of California, Davis
- Occupations: Actress; dancer
- Years active: 2011–present
- Known for: Never Have I Ever
- Children: 1

Richa Shukla Moorjani is an American actress who is best known for her roles as Kamala in the Netflix series Never Have I Ever, and as Indira Olmstead in the fifth season of the American crime drama Fargo.

== Early life and family ==
Moorjani's family lives in Saratoga, California. She attended Saratoga High School and the University of California, Davis, where she majored in communications with a minor in Dramatic Arts. She graduated in 2011.

Moorjani's family managed a Bollywood music band. Her father is Bhojpuri, from Varanasi, Uttar Pradesh, India, and her mother is a Kannadiga, from Karnataka, India.

== Career ==
Moorjani's early years as an actress saw her playing guest roles in several television shows including The Mindy Project (directed by Mindy Kaling), NCIS: Los Angeles, and 9-1-1. She also voice-acted in Fallout 76, a 2018 online action role-playing video game developed by Bethesda Game Studios and published by Bethesda Softworks.

Between 2020 and 2023, Moorjani portrayed Kamala Nandiawada, the main character Devi's cousin, in the Netflix original series Never Have I Ever, which was also co-written by Kaling. She had auditioned for Never Have I Ever through an open casting call. Speaking on playing a woman of color in STEM, she told The Hindu, "I learned about how much women of color in STEM go through. It's a real systemic problem where their names are taken off research papers."

As of late-2021, Moorjani's next project Broken Drawer, directed by Rippin Sindher, has been in post-production. The film is loosely inspired by true events, following a young Sikh mother who was killed while working at her family-owned convenience store in rural California. "Rippin called me and told me how special this role was to her, being based on her mother, and that she couldn't see anyone playing it but me. It turned out to be such a lovely and fulfilling experience," Moorjani told The Hindu.

== Filmography ==
=== Film ===
Year	Film	Role	Notes
2011	Love Fool	Sheela	Short
2015	For Here or to Go?	Journalist at Speed Date	
2015	X: Past Is Present	Sanjana	
2019	Wolf	Arti	Short
2020	Invisible Brown Man	Seema Desai	Short

=== Television ===
Year	Title	Role	Notes
2011	Mark at the Movies	Party girl	One episode (28 May 2011)
2012	Big Time Rush	Palmwoods Girl #2	Episode: "Big Time Surprise"
2012	The Mindy Project	Geeta	Episode: "Thanksgiving"
2013	Sullivan & Son	Girl #1	Episode: "Ladies Night"
2016	The New Yorker: Shorts & Murmurs		Episode: "What I Imagine My Boyfriend's Ex-Girlfriends Are Doing Right Now"
2017	NCIS: Los Angeles	Rayna	Episode: "Unleashed"
2018	9-1-1	Jenna	Episode: "Merry X-mas"
2020–2023	Never Have I Ever	Kamala Nandiwadal	Main role; 34 episodes
2021	Home Economics		Episode: "Bottle Service, $800 Plus Tip (25% Suggested)"
2021	Immoral Compass	Molly	Episode: "Part 8: Nostalgia"
2022	True Story	Fenal	Episode: "Abishek's Story"
2023–2024	Fargo	Indira Olmstead	Season 5, main role
2025	Alien: Earth	Zoya Zaveri	2 episodes
2026	Running Point	Aruna	Season 2

=== Video games ===
Year	Title	Role	Notes
2017	Uncharted: The Lost Legacy	Additional voices	Voice roles
2018	Fallout 76	Abigayle Singh, Watoga, Natasha Hunt, and Nari Simir	Voice roles
