= Untitled Wong Kar-wai/Hiro Murai crime drama =

- Genre: Crime Drama
- Based on: An Original Story by Wong Kar-wai
- Developed by: Charles Yu; Julia Cho
- Starring: Havana Rose Liu
- Country of origin: United States
- Original language: English

Production
- Executive producers: Charles Yu; Julia Cho; Hiro Murai; Carver Karaszewski; Claudia Shin; Kate Dean; Paul Schwartzman; Wong Kar-wai
- Production companies: MSD Imaginary Machines; Chum Films; Jet Tone Production; Searchlight Television; FX Productions

Original release
- Network: FX; FX on Hulu

The Untitled Wong Kar-wai/Hiro Murai crime drama is an upcoming American crime drama television series developed by Charles Yu and Julia Cho and starring Havana Rose Liu for FX. It is based on an original story by director Wong Kar-wai.

== Premise ==
Developed from an original story by Wong, the pilot revolves around a petty criminal who inherits a share in a mysterious and powerful corporation. She then vaults into a world of unimaginable wealth but also constant danger from a ruthless elite who sees her as the ultimate threat.

— Deadline Hollywood

== Cast ==
- Havana Rose Liu

== Production ==
=== Development ===
On October 9, 2026, it was reported that FX had given a pilot order to a crime drama based on an original story by director Wong Kar-wai, whom it'll be written by Charles Yu and Julia Cho with Hiro Murai directing the pilot. Yu, Cho, and Murai will executive produce alongside Carver Karaszewski, Claudia Shin, Kate Dean, Paul Schwartzman, and Wong.

=== Casting ===
Alongside the series order, it was also announced that Havana Rose Liu will star in the pilot.
