= Blake DeLong =

American actor

- Born: 1980 (age 45–46); Dallas, Texas, U.S.
- Education: The University of Texas at Austin
- Occupation: Actor

Blake Anthony DeLong (born 1980) is an American film, television, and stage actor best known for originating the role of Andrey/Old Bolkonsky in the hit musical Natasha, Pierre & The Great Comet of 1812. He played the lead role opposite James Hand in Matt Muir's film Thank You a Lot, which premiered on the opening night of SXSW Film Festival in 2014. He is featured in Ava DuVernay's When They See Us on Netflix and played supporting roles in Spike Lee's 2018 film Pass Over, as well as Sister Aimee and Late Night, which both appeared at the Sundance Film Festival in 2019. He recently earned praise as axe murderer William Kemmler in the 2020 Sundance film Tesla, by Michael Almereyda. Notable stage work includes Othello at New York Theatre Workshop, a turn as David Amram in Illyria at The Public Theater, and the sixth Broadway revival of Death of a Salesman, opposite Wendell Pierce.

== Personal life ==
DeLong was born in Dallas, Texas and began acting in plays as a student at Lake Highlands High School. He met director Matt Muir in graduate school at the University of Texas at Austin, who cast him in his first film roles. DeLong's master's thesis was titled "Piece in progress" : writing, producing and performing a new play, "All of a piece". After moving to New York City, DeLong worked odd jobs and starred in regional theater productions before booking commercials, Off-Broadway theater, television, and eventually, work in higher profile films. In 2021, he had a supporting role in the film The United States vs. Billie Holiday, directed by Lee Daniels.

== Filmography ==
Film
Year	Title	Role	Notes
2011	We Need To Talk About Kevin	Young Suited Man #1	
2014	Thank You a Lot	Jack Hand	
2016	Auld Lang Syne	Bryce	
2016	Complete Unknown	James	
2018	Pass Over	Ossifer	
2018	Shy Guys	Russell	Short film
2018	Johnny	Victor	Short film
2019	Sister Aimee	Detective Brown	
2019	Bagatelle	Cowboy	Short film
2019	Cubby	Mitch	
2019	Late Night	McCary	
2020	A Quiet Place Part II	Umpire	
2020	Tesla	William Kemmler	
2021	Mayday	Victory Captain (voice)	
2021	The United States vs. Billie Holiday	Agent Carter	
2021	The Land of Owls	Paul	
2021	Are You Happy Now	Leo	

Television
Year	Title	Role	Notes
2014	The Blacklist	Chris Perez	Episode: "The Front"
2015	The Following	Saul	Episode: "A Simple Trade"
2015	The Mysteries of Laura	Carlo	Episode: "Mystery of the Maternal Instinct"
2016	Unforgettable	Sammy Gavlak	Episode: "Bad Company"
2016	Vinyl	Neil Smith	Episode: "Whispered Secrets"
2017	The Good Fight	Mikey	Episode: "Self Condemned"
2017	The Daily Show	Internet Cafe Customer	Episode: "Rashida Jones"
2019	FBI	Matt Tolan	Episode: "Partners in Crime"
2019	When They See Us	Detective Nugent	Miniseries, 1 episode
2019	The Loudest Voice	Frank	Miniseries, 1 episode
2021	Law & Order: Special Victims Unit	Trace Lambert	Episode: "They'd Already Disappeared"
2022	The Blacklist	Gordon Graham	Episode: "Genuine Models, Inc."

== Stage credits ==
Theater
Year	Title	Role	Location	Notes
2012	Natasha, Pierre & The Great Comet of 1812	Andrey Bolkonsky / Old Prince Bolkonsky	Ars Nova, Off-Broadway	Starring Phillipa Soo, Dave Malloy and Lucas Steele
2013	Natasha, Pierre & The Great Comet of 1812	Andrey Bolkonsky / Old Prince Bolkonsky	Kazino Meatpacking, Off-Broadway	Starring Phillipa Soo, Dave Malloy and Lucas Steele
2013-2014	Natasha, Pierre & The Great Comet of 1812	Andrey Bolkonsky / Old Prince Bolkonsky	Kazino at Times Square, Off-Broadway	Starring Phillipa Soo, Dave Malloy and Lucas Steele
2016-2017	Othello	Soldier	New York Theatre Workshop, Off-Broadway	Starring Daniel Craig, David Oyelowo, and Rachel Brosnahan. Also composed original music
2017	Illyria	David Amram	The Public Theater, Off-Broadway	Starring John Magaro, Fran Kranz, and Will Brill
2022-2023	Death of a Salesman	Howard Wagner / Stanley	Hudson Theatre, Broadway	Starring Wendell Pierce and Sharon D. Clarke

== Awards and nominations ==
Year	Award	Category	Work	Result
2014	Lucille Lortel Award	Outstanding Featured Actor in a Musical	Natasha, Pierre & The Great Comet of 1812	Nominated
