= David Rysdahl =

American actor and screenwriter (born 1987)

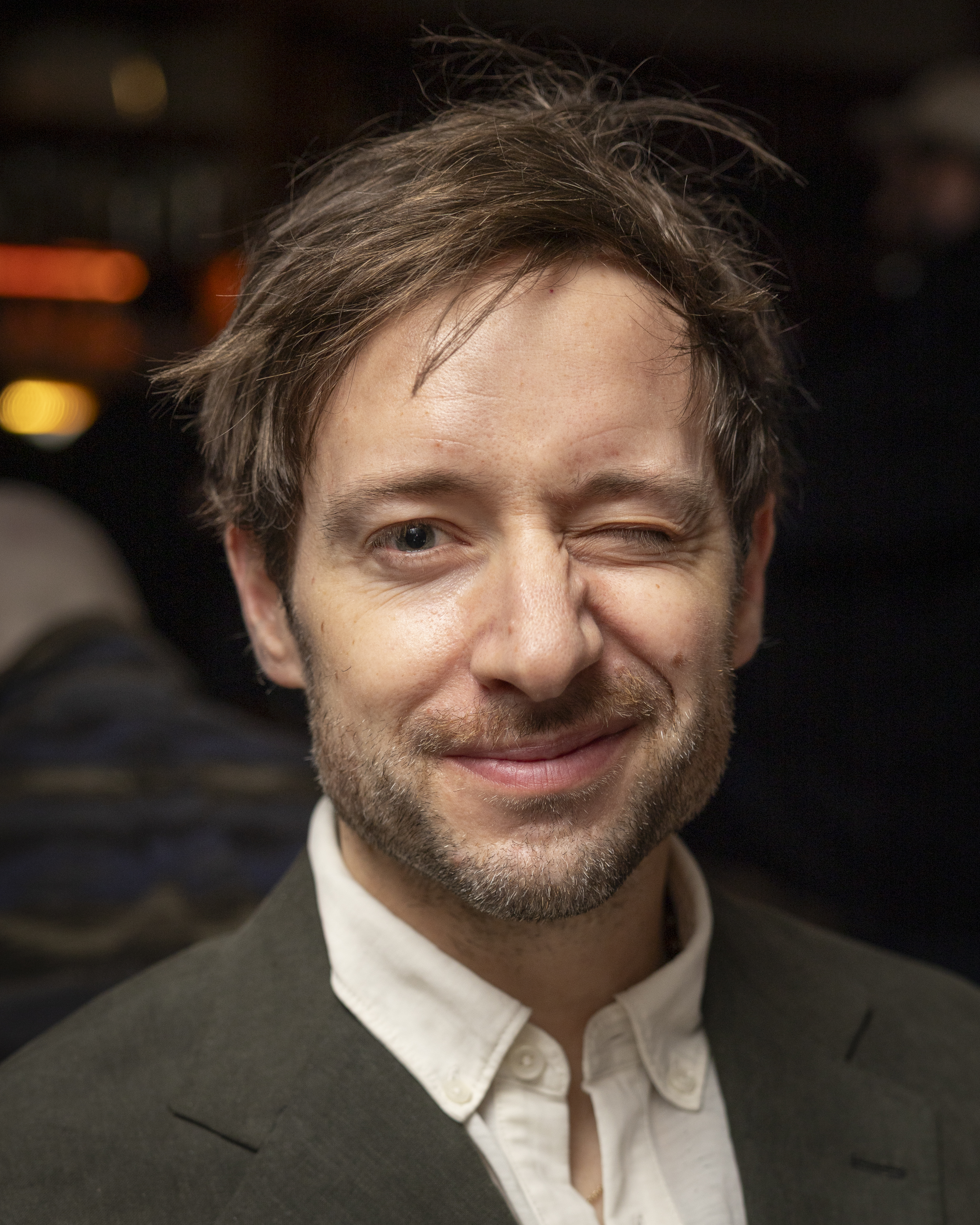
- Rysdahl in 2026
- Born: April 2, 1987 (age 39); New Ulm, Minnesota, U.S.
- Education: St. Olaf College
- Occupations: Actor; Screenwriter
- Years active: 2015–present
- Spouse: Zazie Beetz (m. 2023)

David Rysdahl (born April 2, 1987) is an American actor and screenwriter. He is best known for his lead role in the fifth season of the television series Fargo, his supporting role in the television series Alien: Earth, and for his starring roles in the fantasy drama film Nine Days (2020) and the thriller film No Exit (2022). He also appeared in Oppenheimer (2023).

== Early life ==
Rysdahl was born to Gigi and Scott Rysdahl. He has two brothers and a sister. He grew up in New Ulm, Minnesota, where he attended Cathedral High School. After briefly working in public health in Guatemala, he became more interested in acting as a career.

Rysdahl attended St. Olaf College in Northfield, Minnesota, where he majored in chemistry.

== Career ==
Rysdahl was cast in a stage production of Hamlet at the Great River Shakespeare Festival in Winona, Minnesota.

After moving to New York, Rysdahl starred in short films. In 2018, he starred in Cathy Yan’s comedy-drama Dead Pigs. In 2020, he appeared in the fantasy drama film Nine Days, and in 2022, he starred in the thriller No Exit. His other credits include the Netflix docuseries The Family, episode 4, season 6 of Netflix's Black Mirror, season 5 of the FX series Fargo, and the indie feature The Land of Owls. He played American chemist Donald Hornig in Christopher Nolan's 2023 biopic Oppenheimer. In 2025, Rysdahl played a supporting role as Arthur Sylvia in the FX series Alien: Earth, reuniting him with Fargo creator Noah Hawley.

== Personal life ==
As of February 2022, Rysdahl lives in Harlem.

Rysdahl met actress Zazie Beetz at an acting workshop, and they began dating around 2014. They started a production company called Sleepy Poppy. The couple married in 2023. In October 2026, it was announced that Beetz was pregnant with their first child.

== Filmography ==
=== Film ===
| Year | Title | Role | Notes | Ref. |
|---|---|---|---|---|
| 2015 | That's Not Us | Spencer | | |
| 2017 | The Revival | Eli | | |
| 2018 | Dead Pigs | Sean Landry | | |
| 2020 | Nine Days | Mike | | |
| 2021 | The Land of Owls | Theo | | |
| 2022 | No Exit | Lars | | |
| 2023 | Oppenheimer | Donald Hornig | | |
| 2023 | Booger | Snake | | |
| 2024 | The Luckiest Man in America | Todd | | |
| 2026 | Soulm8te | David Wasson | | |

=== Television ===
| Year | Title | Role | Notes | Ref. |
|---|---|---|---|---|
| 2016 | Next Big Thing | Tom | TV movie | |
| 2017 | Bull | Wes | 2 episodes | |
| 2018 | Guap | Eric | TV movie | |
| 2019 | The Family | Jeff Sharlet | 3 episodes | |
| 2023 | Black Mirror | Nathan | Episode: "Mazey Day" | |
| 2023–2024 | Fargo | Wayne Lyon | Season 5 -- main cast | |
| 2025 | Alien: Earth | Arthur Sylvia | Main cast (season 1) | |
