= The Land of Owls =

- Directed by: Patrick Letterii
- Written by: Patrick Letterii
- Produced by: Brian Dekker; Randa Dekker; Christopher Letterii
- Starring: Emma Duncan; David Rysdahl; Ricardo Davila; Ronald Peet; Jasmin Walker; Blake DeLong
- Cinematography: Nona Catusanu
- Edited by: Coralie Jouandeau
- Distributed by: First Run Features
- Release date: 17 August 2021
- Running time: 79 minutes
- Country: United States
- Language: English

The Land of Owls is a 2021 American romantic drama film directed by Patrick Letterii, starring Emma Duncan, David Rysdahl, Ricardo Davila, Ronald Peet, Jasmin Walker and Blake DeLong.

== Cast ==
- Emma Duncan as Julia
- David Rysdahl as Theo
- Ricardo Davila as Cord
- Ronald Peet as Gene
- Jasmin Walker as Counselor
- Blake DeLong as Paul
- Emma Lahti

== Release ==
The film was released on Apple TV, iTunes and Amazon on 17 August 2021.

== Reception ==
Benjamin Franz of Film Threat gave the film a score of 8/10 and praised the script, the direction and the performances.

Trudy Root of the Video Librarian rated the film 3 stars out of 4 and wrote, "A quiet thoughtful film, Land of Owls is a strong optional choice."

André Hereford of Metro Weekly rated the film 3 stars out of 5 and wrote that the film "evokes the tranquility and reflection one might garner on a hot, lazy weekend spent at a rustic Catskills retreat."
