= Dead Pigs =

- Chinese: 海上浮城
- Directed by: Cathy Yan
- Written by: Cathy Yan
- Produced by: Clarissa Zhang; Jane Zheng
- Cinematography: Federico Cesca
- Edited by: Alex Kopit
- Music by: Andrew Orkin
- Distributed by: Mubi
- Release dates: January 19, 2018 (Sundance); January 25, 2019 (China); February 12, 2021
- Running time: 121 minutes
- Countries: China; United States
- Languages: Chinese; English; Shanghainese

Dead Pigs (Chinese: 海上浮城; literally "floating city on the sea") is a 2018 comedy drama film written and directed by Cathy Yan in her directorial feature film debut. It stars Vivian Wu, Haoyu Yang, Mason Lee, Meng Li, and David Rysdahl. The film had its world premiere in the World Cinema Dramatic Competition section at the 2018 Sundance Film Festival on January 19, 2018. It was released worldwide on Mubi on February 12, 2021.

== Synopsis ==
A bumbling pig farmer, a feisty salon owner, a sensitive busboy, an ambitious expat architect and a disenchanted rich girl converge and collide as thousands of dead pigs float down the river towards a rapidly modernizing Shanghai, China.

== Cast ==
- Vivian Wu as Candy Wang
- Haoyu Yang as Old Wang
- Mason Lee as Wang Zhen
- Meng Li as Xia Xia
- David Rysdahl as Sean Landry
- Zazie Beetz as Angie
- Archibald C. McColl IV as Phil Johnson

== Production ==
The film was written and directed by Cathy Yan. It was inspired by the 2013 Huangpu River dead pigs incident. Yan said, "I was born close to Shanghai, and I used to be a reporter, so it just felt like the story I had to tell." The film was shot by Federico Cesca. Filming took place in Shanghai.

== Release ==
The film had its world premiere in the World Cinema Dramatic Competition section at the 2018 Sundance Film Festival on January 19, 2018. It was released in China on January 25, 2019. The film was released worldwide on Mubi on February 12, 2021.

== Reception ==
=== Critical reception ===
On review aggregator website Rotten Tomatoes, the film holds an approval rating of 97% based on 33 reviews, and an average rating of 7.7/10. Its site consensus reads, "Dead Pigs casts a sharp critical and satirical eye toward late-stage capitalism in China and the world beyond, establishing writer-director Cathy Yan as a filmmaker to watch." On Metacritic, the film has a weighted average score of 72 out of 100 based on nine reviews.

Justin Lowe of The Hollywood Reporter described the film as "a dark, quirky comedy that peels back the layers of contemporary Mainland mores and reveals a group of people almost completely deracinated by their quest to get ahead in a society buffeted by rapidly shifting cultural expectations." Jessica Kiang of Variety wrote, "Yan's film, with its dancing girls, pigeon-fancying beauticians, Westerners-on-the-make and spontaneous musical numbers, is an antidote to China's weightier arthouse output, settling the stomach after too much stolid social realism, effervescent as an alka-seltzer." Elizabeth Horkley of Mubi praised the verisimilitude of Yan's cast of characters, writing: "Dead Pigs, in its favoring of ordinary, human interactions over narrative pomp, leads to unexpected places that shouldn't be unexpected at all. Her characters behave like multifaceted humans, and the pleasure in watching Yan’s debut feature is akin to the feeling of meeting someone new who you think you're going to like."

=== Accolades ===
Award	Year of ceremony	Category	Recipient(s)	Result	Ref(s)
Palm Springs International Film Festival	2019	Ricky Jay Magic of Cinema Award	Dead Pigs	Won	
Philadelphia Film Festival	2018	Archie Award for Best First Feature	Dead Pigs	Won	
Seattle International Film Festival	2018	Grand Jury Prize for New Directors Competition	Dead Pigs	Won	
Seattle International Film Festival	2018	China Stars Award for Best First Film	Dead Pigs	Won	
Sundance Film Festival	2018	World Cinema Dramatic Special Jury Award for Ensemble Acting	Dead Pigs	Won	
Toronto Reel Asian International Film Festival	2018	National Bank Best First Feature Film Award	Dead Pigs	Won	
