= Zazie Beetz =

American actress (born 1991)

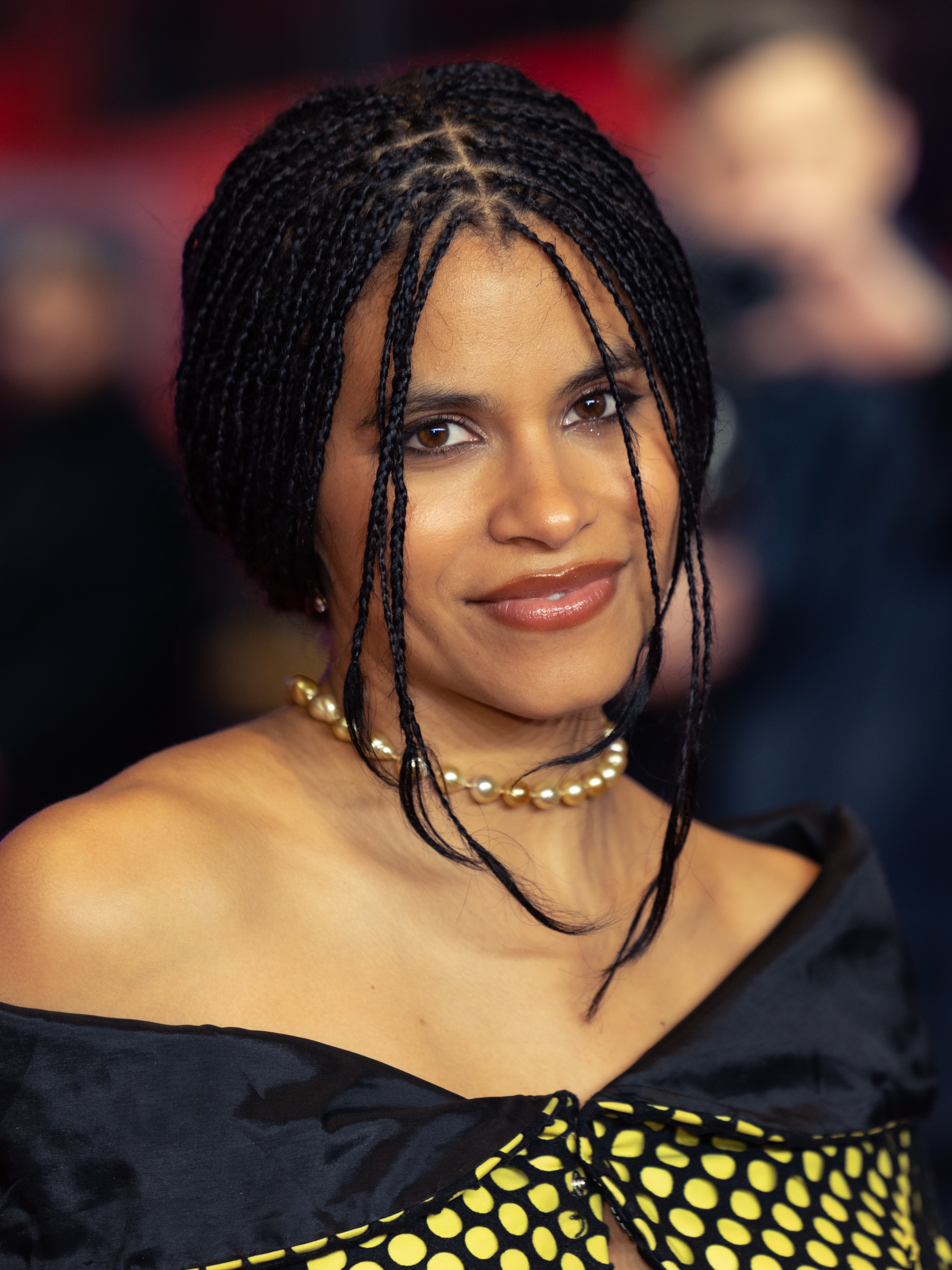
- Beetz at the 2026 Berlinale
- Born: Zazie Olivia Beetz; June 1, 1991 (age 35); Berlin, Germany
- Citizenship: Germany; United States
- Education: Skidmore College (BA)
- Occupation: Actress
- Years active: 2013–present
- Spouse: David Rysdahl (m. 2023)

Zazie Olivia Beetz (/zəˈsiː ˈbeɪts/ zə-SEE BAYTS; German: [zaˈsiː ˈbeːts]; born June 1, 1991) is a German-American actress. She is known for her role as Van in the FX comedy-drama series Atlanta (2016–2022), for which she received a nomination for the Primetime Emmy Award for Outstanding Supporting Actress in a Comedy Series. She starred in the Netflix anthology series Easy (2016–2019) and has voiced Amber Bennett in the adult animated superhero series Invincible since 2021. On film, she is known for her roles as Domino in the superhero film Deadpool 2 and Arthur Fleck's neighbor in the psychological thriller Joker (2019) and its sequel Joker: Folie à Deux (2024).

== Early life and education ==
Zazie Olivia Beetz was born in Berlin in 1991. Her father Thomas Beetz is a German cabinet maker who immigrated to the United States in 1990 after the fall of the Berlin Wall, and her mother is an African-American social worker from New York. Her parents separated when she was very young.

Beetz was named after the title character in the Raymond Queneau novel Zazie in the Metro. The pronunciation, with [s], follows the German-dubbed version of the 1960 film adaptation of the novel. She has a younger brother named Justin.

Beetz attended preschool in Berlin and kindergarten in New York City before moving with her family there more permanently at the age of eight, speaking both German and English with her family at home. Her mixed-race identity was a source of discomfort for her during her youth.

Growing up in New York's Washington Heights neighborhood, she became interested in acting while attending Muscota New School and performed in community theaters and on local stages. She graduated from the LaGuardia Arts High School in 2009, and attended Skidmore College, graduating in 2013 with a bachelor's degree in French. She spent a year living in Paris.

== Career ==
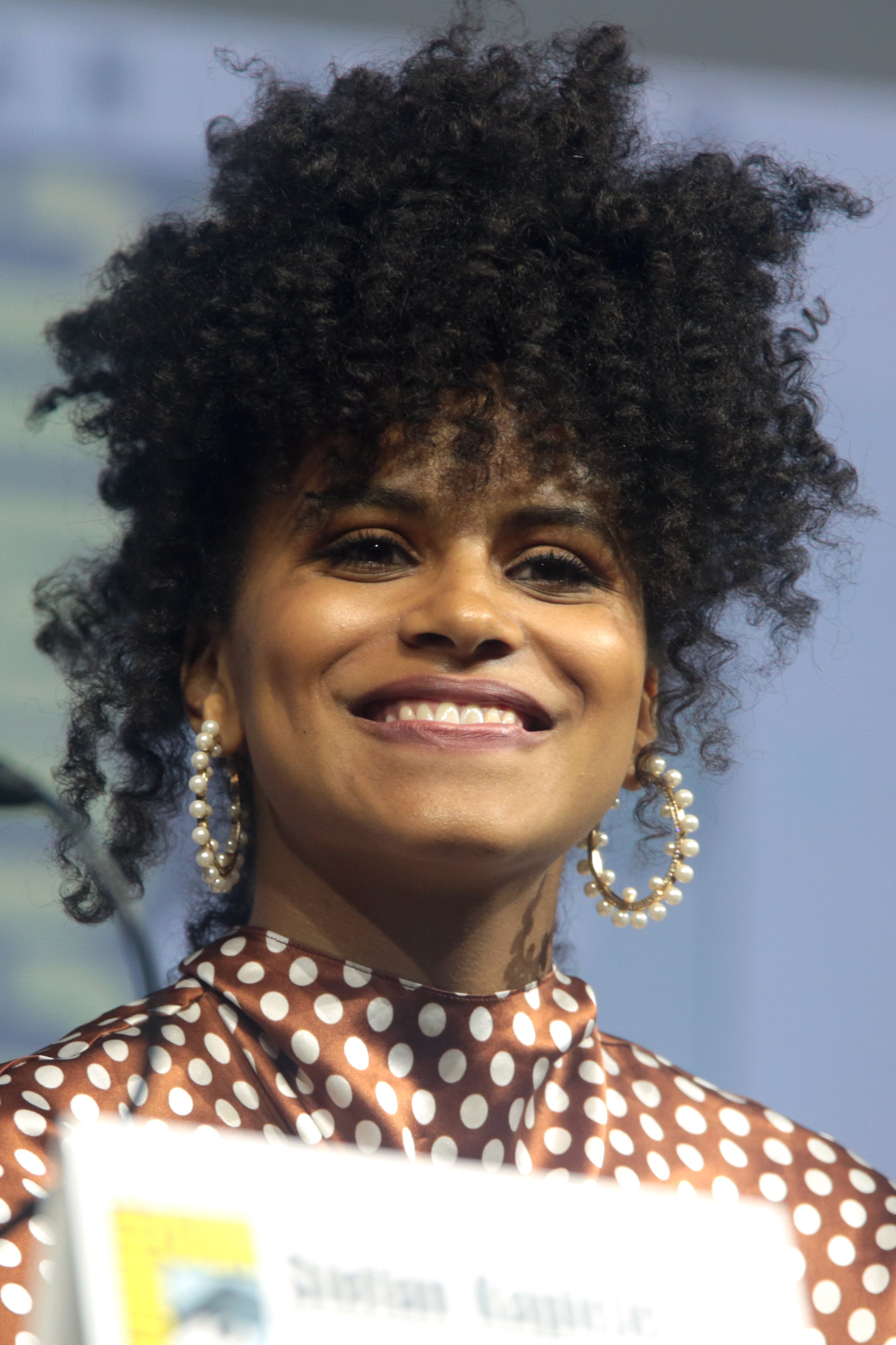
Beetz at the 2018 San Diego Comic-Con

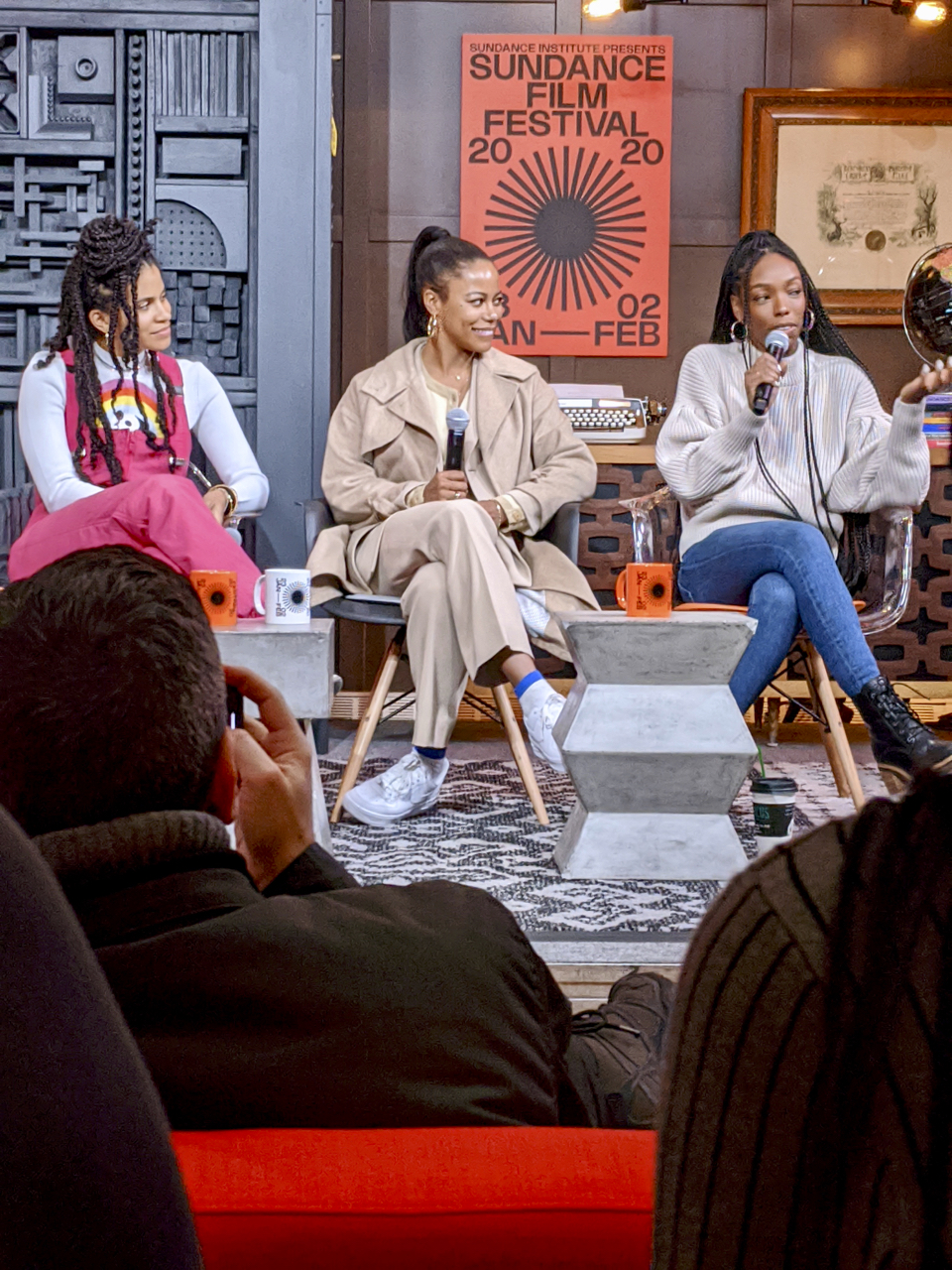
Beetz (left) with Taylour Paige (center) and Elle Lorraine (right) at the 2020 Sundance Film Festival

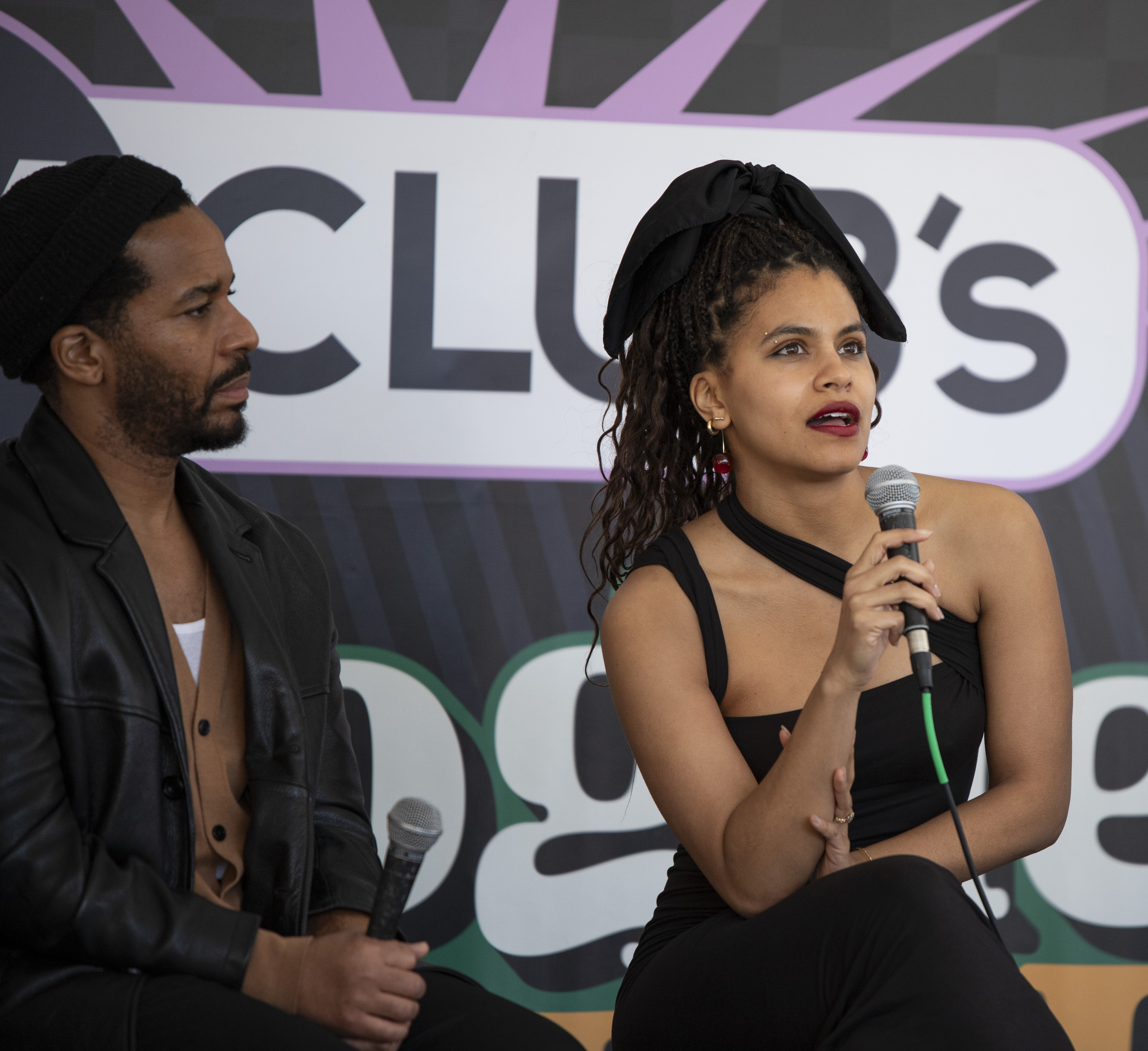
André Holland (left) and Beetz (right) promoting The Dutchman at South by Southwest 2025

After Beetz graduated from college, she spent a year waiting tables before she was cast in Atlanta. At the 70th Primetime Emmy Awards in 2018, Beetz received a nomination for Outstanding Supporting Actress In A Comedy Series, for her role in the show.

In one of her earlier film roles, Beetz appeared in the disaster film Geostorm (2017). The following year, she portrayed the Marvel Comics character Domino in the superhero film Deadpool 2, with the role landing her a nomination for the Teen Choice Award for Choice Summer Movie Actress.

In 2019, Beetz played the title character's neighbor in the psychological thriller Joker (2019) and reprised the role its sequel Joker: Folie à Deux (2024). For her role in Joker, she earned a nomination for the Saturn Award for Best Supporting Actress.

Beetz has also voiced Diane Foxington (a.k.a. the Crimson Paw) in the DreamWorks Animation heist comedy film The Bad Guys (2022) and its sequel The Bad Guys 2 (2025); the former of which landed her a nomination for the Black Reel Award for Outstanding Voice Performance.

== Personal life ==
In May 2022, Vanity Fair reported that Beetz was recently engaged to her writing partner, actor David Rysdahl. They met during an acting workshop and have been together since 2014. They started a production company called Sleepy Poppy. The couple married in 2023. In October 2026, it was announced that Beetz was pregnant with their first child.

== Filmography ==
=== Film ===
Year	Title	Role	Notes
2015	James White	Girl #1	
2015	Applesauce	Rain	
2016	Wolves	Victoria	
2017	Sollers Point	Courtney	
2017	Geostorm	Dana	
2018	Dead Pigs	Angie	
2018	Deadpool 2	Neena Thurman / Domino	Nominated — Teen Choice Award for Choice Summer Movie Actress
2018	Slice	Astrid	
2019	Wounds	Alicia	
2019	High Flying Bird	Sam	
2019	The Undiscovered Country	Darla	
2019	Seberg	Dorothy Jamal	
2019	Joker	Sophie Dumond	Nominated — Saturn Award for Best Supporting Actress
2019	Lucy in the Sky	Erin Eccles	
2020	Nine Days	Emma	Won — Denver Film Festival Award for Excellence in Acting
2020	Still Here	Keysha	
2021	Extinct	Dottie	Voice role
2021	The Harder They Fall	Stagecoach Mary	Won — As part of AAFCA Award for Best Ensemble
2022	The Bad Guys	Diane Foxington / The Crimson Paw	Voice role; Nominated — Black Reel Award for Outstanding Voice Performance
2022	Bullet Train	The Hornet	
2024	Joker: Folie à Deux	Sophie Dumond	
2025	The Dutchman	Kaya	
2025	The Bad Guys 2	Diane Foxington	Voice role
2025	Good Luck, Have Fun, Don't Die	Janet	
2026	They Will Kill You	Asia Reaves	
TBA	Kockroach †	TBA	Post-production
TBA	Untitled David Mackenzie film †	TBA	Post-production

=== Television ===
Year	Title	Role	Notes
2016	Margot vs. Lily	Allie	Miniseries
2016–2022	Atlanta	Vanessa "Van" Kiefer	Main role; Nominated – Primetime Emmy Award for Outstanding Supporting Actress In A Comedy Series
2016–2019	Easy	Noelle	4 episodes
2019	The Twilight Zone	Sophie Gelson	Episode: "Blurryman"
2020–2022	Robot Chicken	Various	Voice role; 3 episodes
2020	Home Movie: The Princess Bride	Princess Buttercup	2 episodes
2020	Acting for a Cause	Natalie Keener	Episode: "Up in the Air"
2021–present	Invincible	Amber Bennett	Recurring voice role, 12 episodes
2023	History of the World, Part II	Mary Magdalene	3 episodes
2023	Black Mirror	Bo	Episode: "Mazey Day"
2023	Full Circle	Mel Harmony	Miniseries
2023	Big Mouth	Danni	Recurring voice role, 4 episodes
2026	Nocturne	Saga Bauer	Main role; executive producer
TBA	Discretion		Recurring role; upcoming series
