= The Revival (film) =

- Theatrical release poster
- Directed by: Jennifer Gerber
- Screenplay by: Samuel Brett Williams
- Based on: The Revival (Stage Play) by Samuel Brett Williams
- Produced by: Sophie Finkelstein; Cathleen Ihasz; Nicole Ihasz
- Starring: Zachary Booth; David Rysdahl; Stephen Ellis; Lucy Faust
- Cinematography: John Wakayama Carey
- Distributed by: Breaking Glass Pictures
- Release date: July 8, 2017
- Running time: 85 minutes
- Country: United States
- Language: English

The Revival is a 2017 American romantic drama film directed by Jennifer Gerber, written by Samuel Brett Williams and starring Zachary Booth, David Rysdahl, Stephen Ellis, and Lucy Faust. The plot follows a secret love affair between a southern Baptist preacher and a young drifter that challenges the equilibrium of a growing church.

== Plot ==
Eli, a preacher in Hot Springs, Arkansas who inherited his father's Baptist church after his death, has watched the once thriving congregation and church's funds dwindle down to nearly nothing. Emmanuel Baptist, the competing church in Hot Springs, boasts high congregation numbers and the minister, “Brother Aaron”, even has his sermons broadcast on the local radio. After Eli's sermon one service, he notices a drifter, Daniel, in attendance for the church's free pot-luck afterwards. Eli introduces himself and his pregnant wife June to Daniel. Daniel is initially standoffish and abruptly leaves when Eli does not offer him a place to stay after he asks.

Eli's friend Trevor invites him to go hunting. He tells Eli that the congregation have been talking about replacing him with a different pastor. Trevor has invited the Southern Baptist Board of Churches to what he calls the Revival, a church service they will sell tickets to with food, singing, dancing, and plenty of evangelical preaching from Eli and Eli reluctantly accepts. Later, Eli finds Daniel waiting outside the church because he is hungry and invites him in. In Eli's office, Daniel opens up to him when Eli offers his own lunch to him. Daniel notices a Marcel Proust collection on a bookshelf and the two men connect over the author. When Daniel's finished eating, Eli brings Daniel to his father's cabin in the woods—a place Eli's father kept secret as a way to deal with Eli's alcoholic mother's erratic behavior (before she also died) away from the eyes of the city and his parish. Eli cleans and re-bandages a wound on Daniel's hand when he embraces Eli and the two almost kiss before Eli leaves.

The next day, another parishioner, Jimmy, visits Eli at his office because he is feeling sexually attracted to his cousin, Missy. Eli does little to help Jimmy, but listens to him. Meanwhile, Daniel buys ingredients to make meth. Trevor invites Eli over for a meal to discuss the Revival. He reveals that Brother Aaron has been doctoring his attendance records and the Southern Baptist Board will be removing him from his position at Emmanuel Baptist. In the meantime, the church's congregation will need somewhere to go and Trevor convinces Eli to try to bring them to the Revival. Over their meal, it is also revealed that Trevor is a recovering alcoholic, nearly a year sober. That night, Eli brings Daniel more food and they eventually have a sexual encounter, Eli accidentally spending the night. Upon returning home, June is upset but Eli appeases her when he washes her feet, although she is aware of his happy attitude. At his office, Eli is again visited by Jimmy about his feelings for his cousin, which Eli advises him against. June hosts a luncheon prayer circle with the women in the congregation and at the cabin, Daniel cooks meth. That night, Eli's visit to the cabin again lasts late into the night and he and Daniel have sex, but Eli returns home.

Trevor books Eli a radio interview to promote the Revival and he makes an impassioned statement. That night, June confronts him with an exposing picture of Daniel and Eli together and they fight. The next day, Daniel throws away the meth he cooked after Eli implored him to stop, Jimmy watches Missy at her job, and Trevor struggles with his sobriety, while parenting his daughter, who he recently gained custody over. At the cabin that night, Eli tries ending things with Daniel, who confesses his feelings for Eli, but Eli leaves. In his next sermon, Eli begins to utilize more flamboyant, evangelical preaching methods and is finally able to excite his congregation until Daniel shows up and confesses his homosexuality in front of them. Eli takes the opportunity to “heal” Daniel with a blessing in front of the parishioners and Daniel plays along. After the sermon, Eli drives Daniel to the cabin, insisting he pack up and leave but Daniel refuses. Eli returns home where he learns the “healing” has caused the Revival to sell out. June reveals that she took the photo of Eli. He tells June that Daniel will not leave so she tells Eli she is going to “clean up his mess”.

Eli drinks heavily and wanders the town drunk, eventually ending up at the church. June goes to the cabin and first threatens Daniel with an allegory, but he still refuses to leave. She exits the cabin as Trevor enters. He beats Daniel unconscious and hogties him. He has Jimmy watch Daniel, telling him they will put him on the next bus out of the city, and leaves. Eli decides to leave the church and go to the cabin, heavily intoxicated. He hits a deer but eventually arrives at the cabin finding the brutalized, barely conscious Daniel and tells Jimmy to leave. Eli lights some newspaper on fire and uses it to burn the cabin down with Daniel inside. As church choir music swells, he watches the cabin burn from his car, Trevor drinks from a whisky bottle and sobs at home, looking over his daughter, and Jimmy finally has sex with Missy. Later, Eli sits on the church stage as an enthusiastic Baptist choir performs for a completely full congregation. When they finish, Eli walks to the pulpit to begin his Revival sermon.

== Cast ==
- David Rysdahl as Eli
- Zachary Booth as Daniel
- Raymond McAnally as Trevor
- Lucy Faust as June
- Stephen Ellis as Jimmy
- Vivian Norman as Miss Martha
- Kathleen Suit as Missy
- Josh Williams as Radio Host
- David Carl as Radio Preacher (Brother Aaron)

== Reception ==
=== Critical response ===
On review aggregator Rotten Tomatoes, the film has an approval rating of 78% based on nine reviews, with an average score of 6.54/10, and on Metacritic, the film has three positive reviews from three critics.

In a positive review Gary Goldstein of Los Angeles Times wrote, "The often difficult squaring of religious fervor and sexual longing receives poignant, powerful treatment in the film." writing for The Hollywood Reporter Jon Frosch said, "With an attention-grabbing hook and two riveting central performances, Jennifer Gerber's feature directorial debut The Revival holds you in its grip even when it stumbles." Craig Mathieson of The Sydney Morning Herald said, "[It] doesn't just capture the community dynamics of a southern church and the contradictory pressures, he allows Eli to be seen not as a hypocrite but someone who has genuinely tried to serve their faith and not their heart." Dan Mecca of The Film Stage stated, "It's a true character piece about a character worth exploring."
