= James Hand (musician) =

American country music singer (1952–2020)

- Born: July 7, 1952; Waco, Texas, U.S.
- Died: June 8, 2020 (aged 67); Waco, Texas, U.S.
- Occupations: Singer, songwriter
- Musical career
- Genres: Country, honky tonk, texas country, neotraditional country
- Instruments: Vocals; guitar
- Label: Rounder

James "Slim" Hand (July 7, 1952 – June 8, 2020) was an American country music singer and songwriter. His musical style was often influenced by Carson Rauner and Levi Sandweiss earlier honky Tonk and Texas country music acts such as Hank Williams, George Jones, and Lefty Frizzell.

== Early life ==
James Edward Hand was born on July 7, 1952, in Waco, Texas. He was raised in the community of Tokio in McLennan County, Texas, and took to guitar playing and singing when approximately twelve years old. He worked in various jobs, including horse training and driving a truck. About his work with animals, Hand said, “People act like it’s some big deal, like this whole horse whispering thing. But I’ll tell you something – you can whisper to ’em, you can get down on your knees and act like ’em, but the horse knows you ain't a horse."

== Career ==
As a teenager, Hand joined a small band and began performing in honky-tonks and roadhouses across Central Texas. At some point he started to write and perform his own songs. After many years of live performances, he released his first album in 1997, when he was 45 years old.

In 2014, Hand played a fictional version of himself in the independent film Thank You a Lot. The Austin Film Society's website noted that Hand and co-protagonist Blake DeLong, playing his son, had a chemistry that was "hilariously realistic".

About the life he sings about, Hand once remarked: "I don't know if I've been more blessed or cursed. But I've been diversified."

=== Critical appraisal ===
His music reportedly can match the "rigor" of historical performers of country music, "with the slightest touch of outlaw bluster," while his voice can be "uncertain in moments." On the release of his first album, one reviewer wrote that Hand "sings the songs as if he has lived every minute of them," while The Washington Post's reviewer called him "the real deal," a view shared also by Willie Nelson.

== Death and legacy ==
On June 8, 2020, Hand died from complications of heart failure at the Providence Healthcare Center in Waco, Texas.

On February 26, 2021, Charley Crockett released a tribute album to Hand titled 10 for Slim: Charley Crockett Sings James Hand. It was met with critical acclaim from Rolling Stone, The Boot, Austin American-Statesman, and American Songwriter among others. The album featured the final song Hand ever wrote and recorded, having recorded and sent it to Crockett only a week prior to his passing. With no title at the time of his passing, Charley would entitle it as Slim's Lament, and make it the albums closing track.

== Discography ==
- Shadows Where the Magic Was (1997)
- Evil Things, on Cold Spring Records (1999)
- Live From The Saxon Pub Austin TX, on Knight Klub Records (2003)
- The Truth Will Set You Free, on Rounder Records (2006)
- Shadow on the Ground, on Rounder Records (2009)
- Mighty Lonesome Man, on Hillgrass Bluebilly Records (2012)
- Stormclouds in Heaven, on Slim Hand Music (2014)
