= Lucy Faust =

American actress

- Born: May 12, 1986 (age 40); New Orleans, Louisiana, U.S.
- Education: Middlebury College
- Occupation: Actress

Lucy Faust is an American actress. Originally from New Orleans, she performed as part of the Southern Rep theater company, before making her name in Mudbound, The Revival, Looking for Alaska, The Devil All the Time, Midnight Special and NCIS: New Orleans.

== Personal life ==
Faust is an alumna of the Academy of the Sacred Heart and Middlebury College. She is a great-grandniece of Helen Keller, and played her teacher, Anne Sullivan, in a Bayou theatre production of The Miracle Worker in 2015.

== Filmography ==
| Year | Film | Role | Notes |
|---|---|---|---|
| 2017 | Mudbound | Vera Atwood | |
| 2017 | The Revival | June | |
| 2020 | Unhinged | Rosie | |
| 2020 | The Devil All the Time | Cynthia Teagardin | |
| 2021 | Breaking News in Yuba County | Janet | |
| 2021 | The Ravine | Mary Ann Turner | (upcoming) |
| 2021 | 12 Mighty Orphans | Wanda | |

== TV series ==
| Year | TV Series | Role | Ref |
|---|---|---|---|
| 2013 | American Horror Story: Coven | Mercy Osbourne | 1 episode |
| 2014 | American Horror Story: Freak Show | Joanne | 2 episodes |
| 2019 | Looking for Alaska | Madame O'Malley | Recurring |
| 2019 | NCIS: New Orleans | Sue-Ann Hughes | Season 1, Episode 20; Season 6 Episode 6,9 |
| 2021 | The Underground Railroad | Fiona | Recurring |
