= Nine Days (film) =

2020 American film by Edson Oda

- Theatrical release poster
- Directed by: Edson Oda
- Written by: Edson Oda
- Produced by: Jason Michael Berman; Mette-Marie Kongsved; Matthew Linder; Laura Tunstall; Datari Turner
- Starring: Winston Duke; Zazie Beetz; Benedict Wong; Tony Hale; Bill Skarsgård; David Rysdahl; Arianna Ortiz
- Cinematography: Wyatt Garfield
- Edited by: Michael Taylor; Jeff Betancourt
- Music by: Antônio Pinto
- Production companies: Juniper Productions; Mandalay Pictures; Nowhere; MACRO Media; The Space Program; Mansa Productions; Oak Street Pictures; 30West; Baked Studios; Datari Turner Productions
- Distributed by: Sony Pictures Classics
- Release dates: January 27, 2020 (Sundance); July 30, 2021 (United States)
- Running time: 124 minutes
- Country: United States
- Language: English
- Budget: $10 million
- Box office: $969,204

Nine Days is a 2020 American fantasy drama film written and directed by Edson Oda in his feature debut. It stars an ensemble cast consisting of Winston Duke, Zazie Beetz, Benedict Wong, Tony Hale, Bill Skarsgård, David Rysdahl, and Arianna Ortiz. In the film, Will (Duke) is a reclusive man residing in a house in the pre-existence with his assistant Kyo (Wong). His job is to interview souls hoping to be born and to observe how the souls he has selected are living on Earth. When one of his previous selections suddenly dies, Will becomes dispirited and confused about the true meaning of life as a new batch of souls arrives to be interviewed.

In 2017, the Sundance Institute selected Oda to participate in its annual screenwriting lab in the state of Utah. The character of Will is based on his uncle, who died by suicide when Oda was 12 years old. Funding the project proved difficult. After a number of specialty distributors turned the producers down, they put together a team of executive producers, including Spike Jonze, to obtain the $10 million budget. Nine Days was shot in less than a month in Utah. Locations included a warehouse in West Valley City and an exterior set constructed at the Bonneville Salt Flats. Filming wrapped in the summer of 2019. During post-production, editing was completed by Michael Taylor and Jeff Betancourt, and the musical score was composed by Antônio Pinto.

Nine Days premiered on January 27, 2020, at the Sundance Film Festival, where Oda received the Waldo Salt Screenwriting Award in the U.S. Dramatic Competition. Following a delay by the COVID-19 pandemic, the film was released in select theaters on July 30, 2021, with a nationwide release on August 6, by Sony Pictures Classics. It received generally favorable reviews from critics as well as various awards and nominations for Oda's direction, Pinto's score, and the performances of Duke and Beetz.

== Plot ==
Will is an arbiter who judges souls before they inhabit bodies in the living. He lives in an isolated house in the middle of a desert landscape, interviewing candidate souls for the opportunity to be born. If they are not selected, Will gives them an experience of their choosing to enact before their existence is erased. His only company is Kyo, who acts as a sort of supervisor, making sure Will selects the best candidate and assisting him with the process. Unlike Will, who spent a previous lifetime as a living being, Kyo was never alive. Will spends his days watching and taking notes on a multitude of television screens, each displaying the life of a different individual that Will has previously selected. His favorite is Amanda, a 28-year-old violin prodigy. While observing Amanda drive to a major concert, Will sees her suddenly speed on the highway. Amanda crashes into an overpass and dies.

As Will grapples with Amanda's death, candidates begin arriving to interview for the vacancy Amanda left behind, a process that will take nine days. He asks the candidates simple questions about life and has them take notes on what they like or dislike about the lives of others who were chosen. Will is particularly intrigued by Emma, who displays heightened empathy and curiosity despite showing little interest in the selection process. Over the course of the nine days, most of the candidates are dismissed for various reasons, such as self-consciousness and lack of respect for suffering. Will does his best to recreate life events for the failed candidates, such as walking on the beach or bike-riding through a city, before the candidates disappear forever.

Kyo invites another nearby interviewer to meet with Will, as she had previously selected Amanda's cousin for birth. She shows Will a tape shortly after Amanda's death, which reveals that Amanda left behind a suicide note before her crash. Kyo attempts to help Will get over her death, but Will continues to watch tapes from her life, unable to understand why she did it. Will has told Emma that he cannot tell her anything about his previous life, but in response to her showing concern for him, he now indicates that in his previous life, he once gave a theater performance that made him feel alive but never pursued his passion after that. He reacts angrily when another candidate, Alex, points out Will's hypocrisy for judging people's lives when he never did anything meaningful with his own life.

The candidates are narrowed down to two: Emma and Kane. While Emma is carefree and sees the best in people, Kane is more pessimistic, recognizing the evil in the world and showing resolve to fight back against it. Despite Kyo recommending that Will pick Emma, he chooses Kane to be born. When Will offers Emma a last experience, she writes something down that Will says he cannot do. Emma then declines a last experience and opts to walk across the desert until she disappears. Will later finds a note from Emma where she thanks him and explains she wrote happy memories she had during the interview process. Will finds them written all over the house. Feeling regret, he runs across the desert after Emma, passionately recites selections from Walt Whitman’s Song of Myself, and thanks her.

== Cast ==
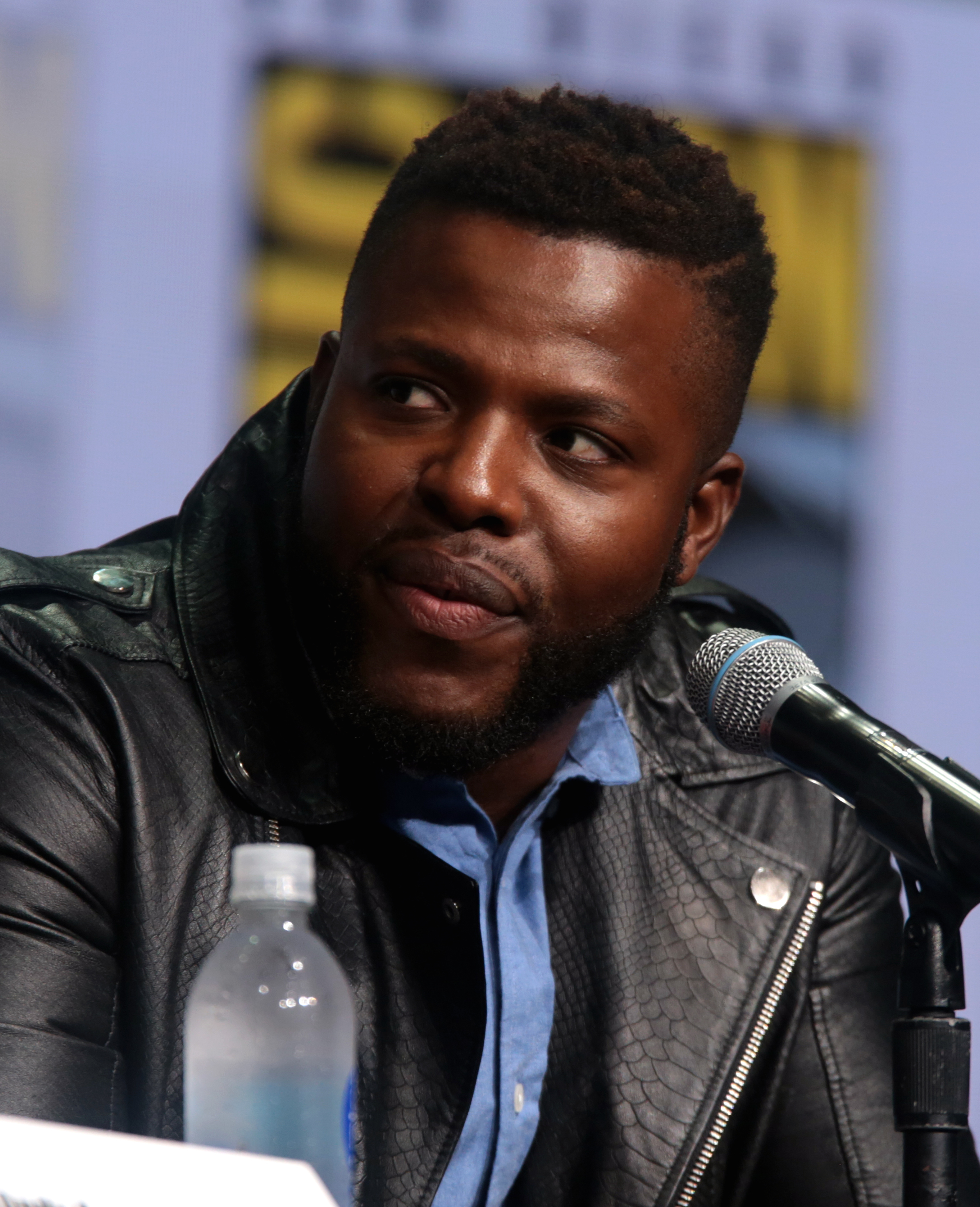
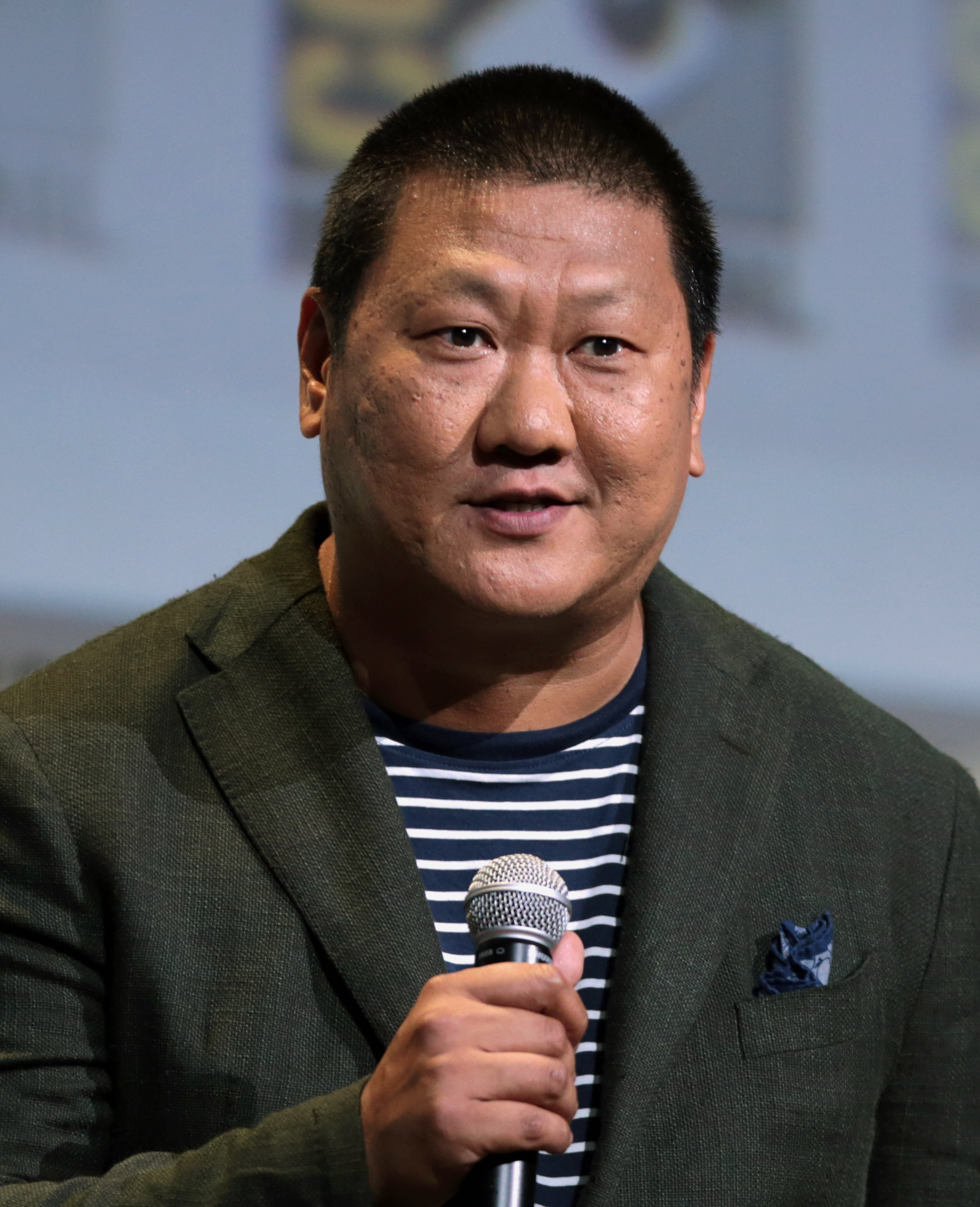
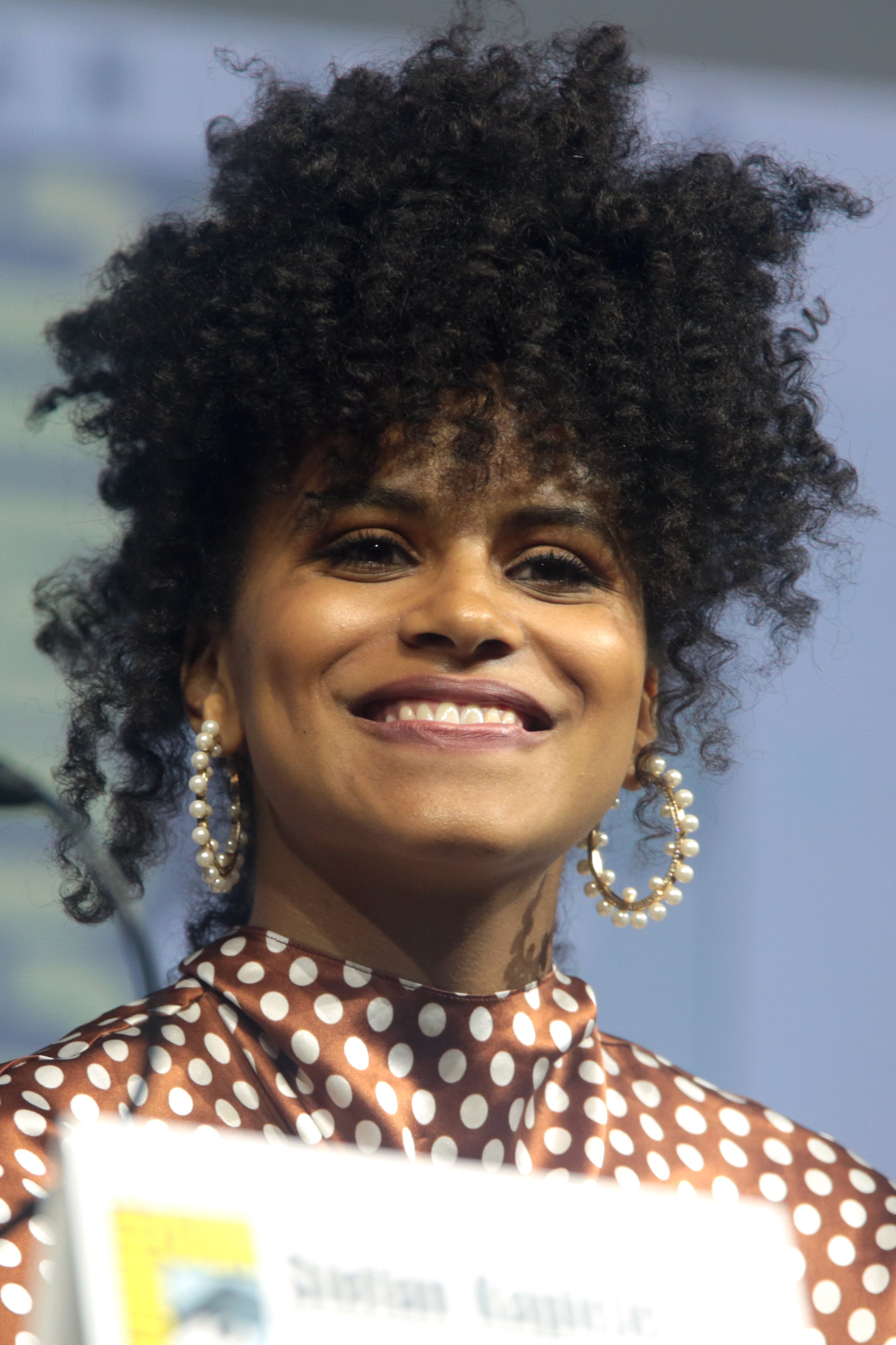
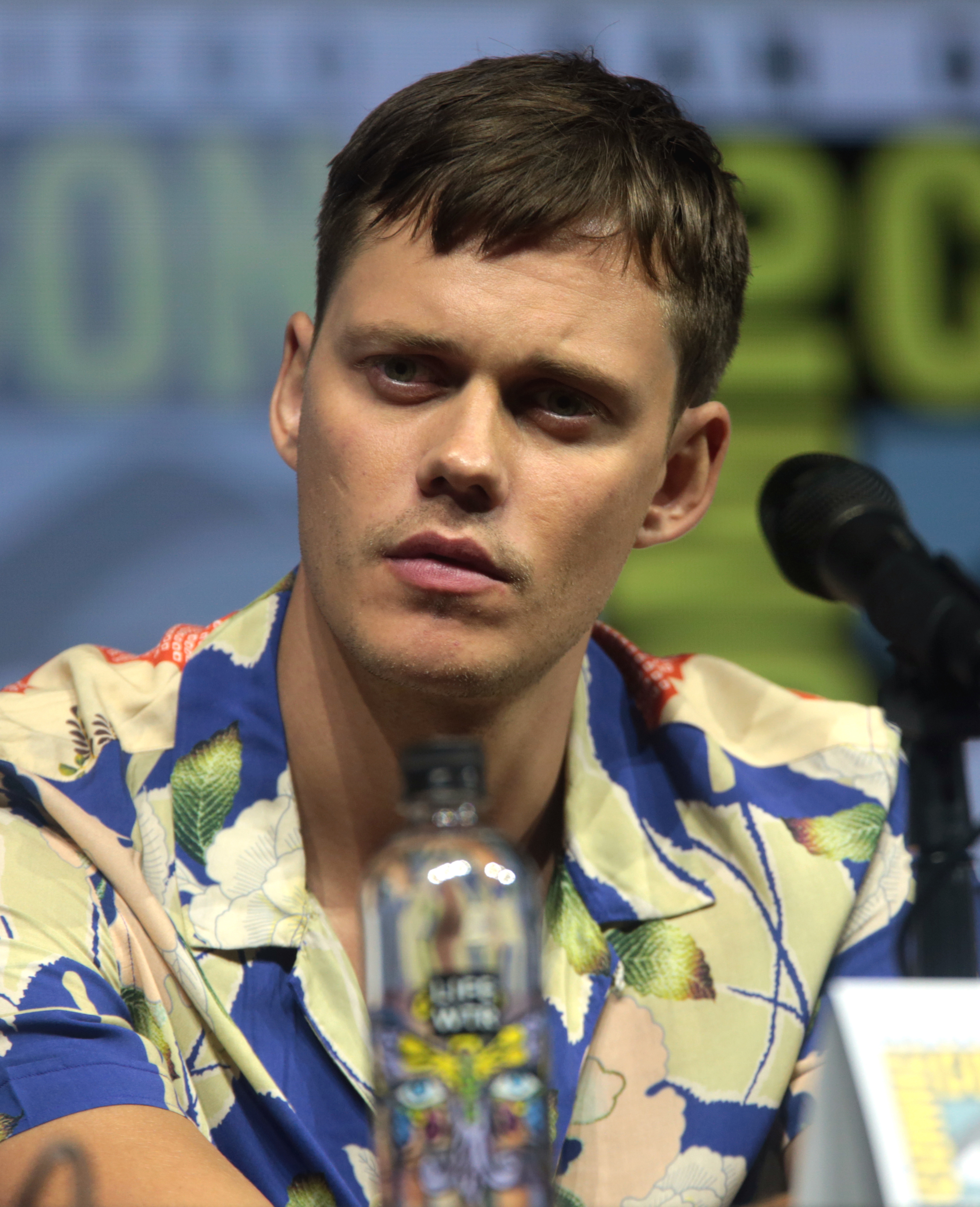
The cast of Nine Days includes Winston Duke and Benedict Wong as Will and his assistant Kyo, and Zazie Beetz and Bill Skarsgård as souls looking for the chance of being born.
- Winston Duke as Will
- Zazie Beetz as Emma
- Benedict Wong as Kyo
- Tony Hale as Alexander
- Bill Skarsgård as Kane
- David Rysdahl as Mike
- Arianna Ortiz as Maria
- Lisa Starrett as Amanda
- Geraldine Hughes as Colleen

== Production ==
=== Development ===
Nine Days is an American co-production between Juniper Productions, Mandalay Pictures, Nowhere, MACRO Media, The Space Program, Mansa Productions, Oak Street Pictures, 30West, Baked Studios, and Datari Turner Productions. It is the feature debut of writer and director Edson Oda. Of Japanese descent, he was born and raised in São Paulo, Brazil. Oda had a successful career in advertising in São Paulo and was the recipient of several accolades, including a Golden Lion from the 2009 Cannes Lions International Festival of Creativity. In 2012, he moved to Los Angeles to pursue a career in filmmaking. He earned his master's in film and production from the USC School of Cinematic Arts but was unmotivated to write. For inspiration, he asked himself, "If I could just make one movie in my entire life, what would that movie be?"

Oda said the film was an exploration of how a real loss can create both the burden and gift of being alive. The character of Will is based on his uncle, who died by suicide at age 50 when Oda was 12 years old. Oda said people would go on to remember his uncle for how he died instead of for the life he lived. He wanted to write a story about what his uncle was going through "instead of judging him through what he did". In 2017, the Sundance Institute selected Oda as one of fifteen emerging screenwriters to participate in its annual screenwriting lab at the Sundance Resort in Utah. Producers on Nine Days were Jason Michael Berman, Mette-Marie Kongsved, Matthew Linder, Laura Tunstall, and Datari Turner. Securing funding for the film proved difficult as the producers had been turned down by several specialty distributors, including A24 and Searchlight Pictures. So, to obtain the $10 million budget necessary to finance it, Berman put together a team of at least a dozen executive producers. Spike Jonze boarded the project as an executive producer in October 2020 after the film's premiere. Oda credited Jonze's Her (2013), a film tackling similar themes of humanity and vulnerability, as a major inspiration for Nine Days, taking notice of Scarlett Johansson's performance as Samantha in the film: "She's almost like a soul ... finding love and all those emotions so dramatically."

=== Casting ===
Winston Duke read the screenplay after working on Us and was immediately interested in its depiction of mental illness and depression. Duke sat down with Oda for a meeting, which turned into a four-hour conversation about various topics ranging from filmmaking to content they both enjoyed to a discussion about life as an immigrant. As Oda described it, "It was almost like, I don't know, love at first sight. It was just amazing to see that I could trust this guy so much. I had a feeling that he has this big heart for humanity inside him." Though the lead role was originally set to be played by an Asian actor, Duke got the part the day after the meeting. According to Duke, the film's title is a reference to the funerary tradition practiced in the Caribbean known as the nine nights, where a person is mourned for nine days because it takes their spirit nine days to say goodbye.

On June 7, 2019, Duke, Zazie Beetz, Bill Skarsgård, Benedict Wong and David Rysdahl were announced to star. Beetz described her character as having a "childlike wonder", living in the present and confronting her issues instead of ignoring them like Will. Wong described his character as a romantic about life, eager for company but alone. To prepare for the role, Wong isolated himself from other people: "I locked myself up in a room ... [and] I didn't talk to anyone, solely just to have personal isolation. And when I came out, I wanted human contact, so that was like Kyo who would walk off into the dead of night, and no one knows where he goes."

In August 2019, Tony Hale joined the cast. Hale described his character as a jokester who wants to have a good time. He categorized Arianna Ortiz's character as a romantic and Rysdahl's character as sensitive, stating that "there was a risk that we each took fully being ourselves. For some, for many, it didn't have the result we wanted, but we did take that risk." When asked about Will's response to his character, Hale said their "personalities triggered something that I think he felt he might've lacked. And so, since he didn't understand it, he didn't think we could take it when in actuality, it might've been a piece of him that was missing that could have helped."

=== Filming ===
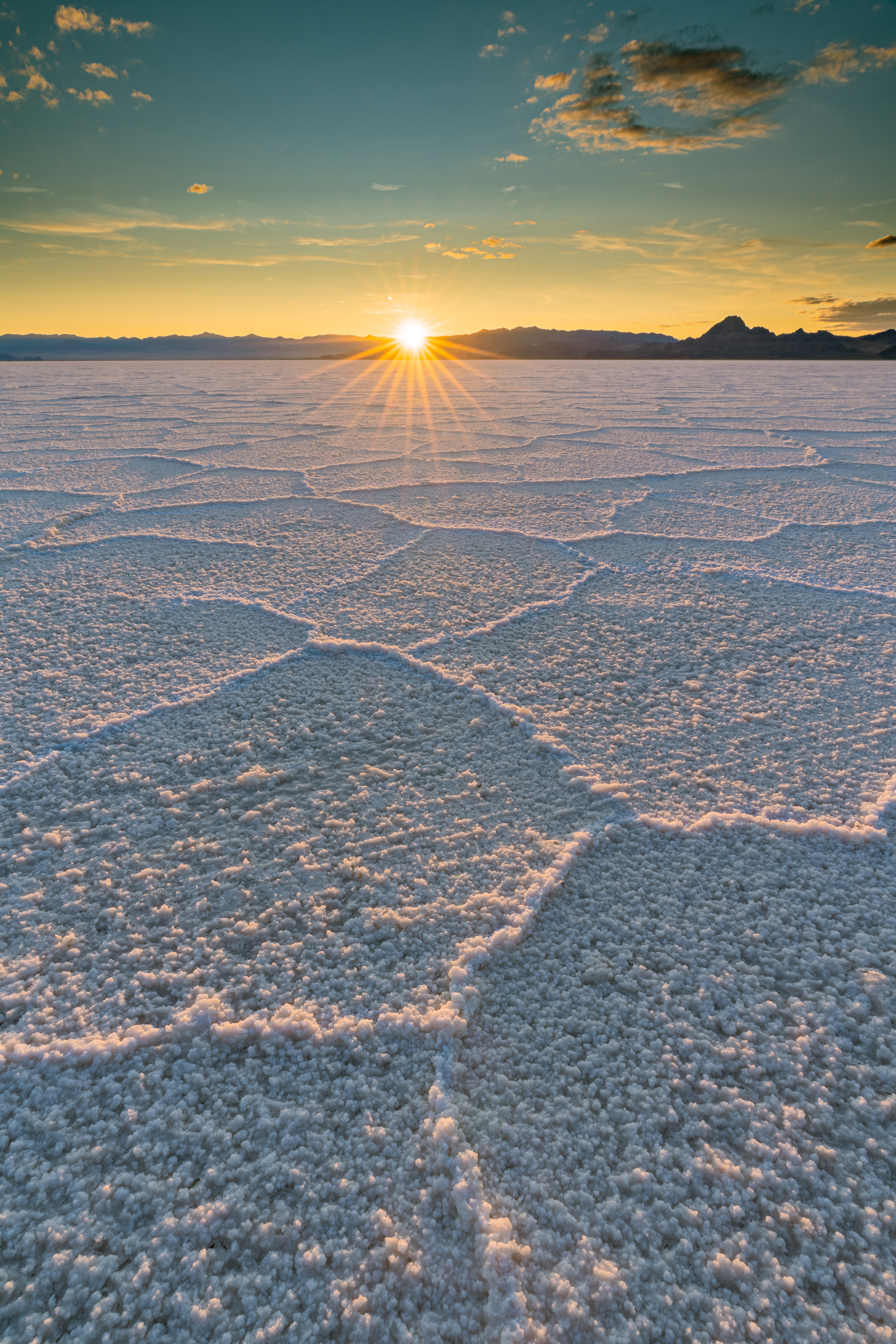
The Bonneville Salt Flats were utilized for the shoot.

The cast had rehearsals for two weeks. Cinematographer Wyatt Garfield cited Schindler's List (1993), Seven (1995), Taking Off (1971), and There Will Be Blood (2007) as inspirations for the interview scenes and Gregory Crewdson as a point of reference for lighting. Garfield said there were two distinct locations in the film. The "limbo" setting, where Will lives, was captured using an Arri Alexa Mini with anamorphic lenses by Optica Elite because they "wanted to feel that the house itself was subtly bending and breathing and not totally concrete". The "real world" scenes, projected only through the televisions in Will's house, were filmed in the span of three weeks in Salt Lake City, Brazil, and Los Angeles with a number of lightweight cameras rigged to helmets and headgear, including a Sony Venice, a Codex Action Cam, and a Blackmagic Cinema Camera. To create a crying effect for point-of-view shots, Garfield recalled sealing water in cellophane candy bags and squeezing them in front of the lens. As a result of the tight schedule, Oda had to cut fifteen pages from the script, including scenes featuring a symbolic spotlight and others involving Kyo.

Principal photography lasted for 24 days. Filming took place in 2019 between August and September in the state of Utah with support from the Motion Picture Incentive Program. An interior set of Will's house was built in a warehouse in West Valley City. Hale said that the house was built beside an office space, where he would often go to rehearse his lines, and noted the contrast between atmospheres. An exterior set was constructed at the Bonneville Salt Flats, which featured a facade of the house. Oda said the location was supposed to "give you the sense that you're not really on Earth". Nine Days was shot entirely in chronological order. Filming would start on Saturdays and end on Wednesdays with two-day breaks in between. The last scene, consisting of a three-page monologue, was filmed over the course of one sunset without any rehearsal or choreography. Filming wrapped early on a Wednesday at 9 a.m. The crew remembered leaving the studio that day and spotting a double rainbow. In an interview, Oda recalled an interaction with Duke after filming a monologue from the film's climax: "We had like a lot of days to go, but there was some kind of sense of 'Mission Accomplished' because after we filmed, everyone felt like we had something special in the can. I remember Winston just came up to me — it was sunset, it was just getting darker — and he said, 'Your uncle is going to be really proud of you, you know.' It meant so much to me; that's something I'll remember.”

=== Post-production ===
Editing was completed by Michael Taylor and Jeff Betancourt. Nine Days received the Dolby Institute Fellowship, a post-production grant that allowed the sound designers to complete the film in Dolby Vision and Dolby Atmos. Antônio Pinto composed the musical score; the theme song, played by Amanda's character on the violin, was composed during pre-production. The song played during the bicycle scene was composed by Yaniel Matos and performed in Portuguese by Manuela Julian. The score was released by Warner Classics on July 9, 2021.

== Release ==
In December 2019, the Sundance Film Festival announced the lineup for the 2020 competition. Nine Days premiered at the festival on January 27, 2020, competing in the U.S. Dramatic Competition with a runtime of 124 minutes. At the premiere, Duke said "What's really beautiful about this story is that it doesn't ever try to spoon-feed you. It's not very didactic in any way. It just presents itself and asks you to have a reaction." In February 2020, Sony Pictures Classics acquired distribution rights to the film for North and Latin America, Eastern Europe, the Middle East, India, Australia, New Zealand, Scandinavia, South Africa, the Benelux, Thailand and airlines; the company would subsequently acquire rights to Israel, Turkey and remaining Asian and European territories, giving it worldwide rights to the film.

A trailer for the film was released on October 12, 2020. In their review of the footage, Screen Rant's Alex McGuire noted the "impressive cast" and the film's "complex questions about existence". Hoai-Tran Bui from /Film said the premise was similar to Pixar's Soul, an animated film also about pre-existence. Syfy Wire's Jacob Oller said the film would intrigue fans of Duke and that there was "definitely some weirdness going on that belies beauty and the deeper questions in life."

Nine Days screened as the opening film of the Austin Film Festival on October 22, 2021. It was originally scheduled to be theatrically released on January 22, 2021. However, as a result of the COVID-19 pandemic, the film was delayed. Nine Days instead opened in four theaters on July 30, 2021, with a nationwide release on August 6. Sony Pictures Home Entertainment released the film on Digital HD, Blu-ray, and DVD on November 2, 2021. Special features include a making-of featurette.

== Reception ==
=== Box office ===
Nine Days grossed $694,849 in the United States and Canada, and $273,467 in other territories, for a worldwide total of $968,316.

In the U.S. and Canada, the film made its debut in four theaters (two in New York and two in Los Angeles) on July 30, 2021. It earned $15,700 in its opening weekend, for an average of $3,925 per theater. In its second weekend, the film made $232,509 after expanding to 443 theaters nationwide.

Outside the U.S. and Canada, the film earned $217,021 in Australia, $56,288 in the Netherlands, and $158 in the United Kingdom.

=== Critical response ===
On the review aggregator website Rotten Tomatoes, 89% of 151 critics' reviews are positive, with an average rating of 7.6/10. The website's critical consensus reads, "A knockout feature directorial debut from Edson Oda, Nine Days is an ethereal and evocative film about the meaning of life – elevated by a phenomenal performance from Winston Duke." Metacritic, which uses a weighted average, assigned the film a score of 72 out of 100 based on 25 critics, indicating "generally favorable reviews". The film would go on to appear in multiple critics' lists of the best film from 2021. Mark Dujsik of RogerEbert.com and Jared Mobarak of The Film Stage called it their favorite film of the year.

Oda was praised for his direction and screenplay. Jacob Oller of Paste called him "one of our most exciting new directors, a filmmaker possessing an innovative cinematic mind with a heart to match." The Guardian's Leslie Felperin said it was "a smidge too ponderous and self-serious for its own good" but still a "reasonably promising debut". Film Threat's Lorry Kikta lauded the script because it communicated its themes in a way that would successfully remind viewers about the value of life without being "preachy or pedantic." The performances of Duke and Beetz were also well received. Richard Roeper of the Chicago Sun-Times noted the "brilliant work" from both actors and said he enjoyed the film due to its straightforward narrative and accessibility, describing it as a combination of Soul and Eternal Sunshine of the Spotless Mind (2004). Peter Debruge from Variety gave positive notes to the story, production design, cinematography, and score and categorized it as the "rare work of art that invites you to re-consider your entire worldview."

=== Accolades ===
Accolades received by Nine Days
Award	Date of ceremony	Category	Recipient(s)	Result	Ref.
Black Reel Awards	February 28, 2022	Outstanding Actor	Winston Duke	Nominated	
Black Reel Awards	February 28, 2022	Outstanding Independent Film	Nine Days (Note: Nominees: Edson Oda)	Nominated	
Denver International Film Festival	November 13, 2020	Excellence in Acting	Zazie Beetz	Won	
Denver International Film Festival	November 13, 2020	Excellence in Acting	Winston Duke	Won	
Gotham Awards	November 29, 2021	Bingham Ray Breakthrough Director Award	Edson Oda	Nominated	
Hollywood Music in Media Awards	November 17, 2021	Best Original Score in an Independent Film	Antônio Pinto	Nominated	
Independent Spirit Awards	April 22, 2021	Best Supporting Male	Benedict Wong	Nominated	
Independent Spirit Awards	April 22, 2021	Best First Feature	Nine Days (Note: Nominees: Edson Oda, Jason Michael Berman, Mette-Marie Kongsved, Matthew Linder, Laura Tunstall, and Datari Turner)	Nominated	
IndieWire Critics Poll	December 13, 2021	Best Films Opening in 2021	Nine Days	39th place	
Newport Beach Film Festival	October 24, 2021	Maverick Award	Winston Duke	Won	
Stockholm International Film Festival	November 19, 2020	Best Film	Nine Days	Nominated	
Sundance Film Festival	February 1, 2020	Grand Jury Prize – Dramatic	Nine Days	Nominated	
Sundance Film Festival	February 1, 2020	Waldo Salt Screenwriting Award – Dramatic	Edson Oda	Won	
