= Tuner (film) =

2025 film by Daniel Roher

- Theatrical release poster
- Directed by: Daniel Roher
- Written by: Daniel Roher; Robert Ramsey
- Produced by: JoAnne Sellar; Lila Yacoub; Teddy Schwarzman; Michael Heimler
- Starring: Leo Woodall; Havana Rose Liu; Dustin Hoffman; Lior Raz; Tovah Feldshuh; Jean Reno
- Cinematography: Lowell A. Meyer
- Edited by: Greg O'Bryant
- Music by: Will Bates (score); Marius de Vries
- Production company: English Breakfast Productions
- Distributed by: Elevation Pictures (Canada); Black Bear Pictures (United States)
- Release dates: August 30, 2025 (Telluride); May 22, 2026 (United States)
- Running time: 107 minutes
- Countries: Canada; United States
- Language: English
- Budget: $7 million
- Box office: $14.8 million

Tuner is a 2025 crime thriller film directed by Daniel Roher and written by Roher and Robert Ramsey. The film stars Leo Woodall, Havana Rose Liu, Dustin Hoffman, Lior Raz, Tovah Feldshuh, and Jean Reno. The film follows Niki, a piano tuner afflicted with hyperacusis, a heightened sensitivity to sound. When his mentor falls ill and has medical debt, Niki pays the debt by safe-cracking by ear for a criminal gang. Over time, Niki, enemies, friends, and others suffer as a result of his well-intentioned actions.

Tuner had its world premiere at the 52nd Telluride Film Festival on August 30, 2025, and was released in the United States by Black Bear Pictures on May 22, 2026. The film received positive reviews from critics.

== Plot ==
Niki White is the apprentice of New York City piano tuner Harry Horowitz, a friend of his late father who teaches him that the tones are more of a feeling than a sound. Although a gifted musician, Niki has hyperacusis and can no longer play the piano, wearing ear protection at all times against loud noises. After Harry forgets the combination to his safe, Niki teaches himself to open it with his heightened hearing, discovering a talent for safe-cracking.

While tuning at a music conservatory, Niki meets Ruthie, a hyper-competitive student pianist and aspiring composer. Flirting, he impresses her with a display of astonishing auditory acuity and memory recall. Later, Niki is tuning at a wealthy client's home until construction noise becomes too loud. He interrupts a trio drilling into a safe, who claim they are installing a new safe, and asks when they will finish. The trio feel insulted and rudely say an indefinite amount of time until the old safe is opened. Niki breaks into the safe for them to save time, impressing them in the process, and receiving an offer of "real money" from their leader, Uri. The next day at a diner, Harry encourages Niki to walk Ruthie to class, but the interaction fizzles when he suggests her composition is derivative. However, they begin a romance after Niki repairs her treasured piano. Niki tells her that it took years of exposure therapy to manage his sensitivity to sound. When Harry is hospitalized after a heart attack, Niki accepts Uri's offer, in order to purchase the tuning business and to save Harry and his wife Marla from a ruinous medical debt. Uri's security company acts as a cover to rob their own clients but is in the need of a safecracker on their team to make even more money. Uri invites Niki to prove his abilities--by opening Uri's own safe--which he does, and thus joins Uri, Uri's nephew Benny, and accomplice Yoni, to rob wealthy homes.

Uri's explanation as to why he was never caught is the law of diminishing marginal productivity: the more people have, the less likely they will notice if something small goes missing. Uri tells Niki, "You can't steal something obvious, like a painting or signature art piece that's on display. But clients generally don't notice if one of several valuable watches goes missing from a cache in the safe. And if they do notice it's missing, they blame someone else and recover from the insurance company." Niki and the crew commit several successful robberies. During one of them, Niki finds a pearl watch that resembles one Ruthie lost, an heirloom from her grandmother, and he gives it to her. He introduces her to Marla and the bedridden Harry, while secretly paying the hospital bills.

Suddenly one night, Uri changes their established routine, requiring Niki to open a safe for a pair of Korean gangsters, retrieving the seed phrase to their own uncle's cryptocurrency wallet. To everyone's surprise, the uncle bursts in, holding everyone at gunpoint and forcing Niki to eat the only copy of the password. Before the uncle can exact his revenge, Benny shoots the uncle dead, allowing Niki and Uri's gang to escape. It turns out that Niki was able to memorize the seed phrase and secretly discovers that the wallet holds more than $18 million.

Sadly, Harry dies, and at his shiva Niki speaks with Herbie Hancock (as himself) telling that Harry's moniker was "tuner fish" (the film's running gag). Uri gatecrashes the event (meanwhile denigrating the meal prepared for the Shiva) and demands that Niki help steal the digital spare key to the Korean uncle's money.

A grieving Niki decides not to join the robbery, but Ruthie's anxiety about her upcoming performance causes her to pick a fight over his divided attentions. Ruthie complains that Niki has never had to work to achieve anything--he's just a piano tuner--while she is working to achieve something truly important and difficult. Niki lashes out--explaining just how hard it was to overcome his disability, and cruelly steps over the line by asserting that before his condition became severe, that he was a better piano player than [Ruthie] will ever be. Storming out of her apartment, Niki encounters Uri's crew. As Niki is disoriented by an air horn, the crew is able to take him in. On the day of Ruthie’s performance, Niki manages to open the safe and retrieve the spare key. It is revealed that the digital wallet now holds $1 million less than what had been shown, hinting that Niki had used the same law of diminishing marginal utility on Uri and his men. Once the ordeal is done, Niki runs across town--on foot--to the Music Academy.

Marius Maissner, a renowned composer who was impressed by Ruthie's performance, invites Ruthie to join a new project as his assistant but recognizes the watch she is wearing--the pearl watch that Niki gave her--as his own grandmother's heirloom, which survived the Holocaust alongside his grandfather's watch. Unfortunately, Maissner explains, the two watches were stolen from his home safe just a few weeks ago. Niki arrives and is confronted by Ruthie and admits the truth to Maissner. Assuring Maissner that Ruthie is blameless, Niki offers to recover his grandfather's watch in exchange for not involving the police.

Niki tries to retrieve the watch from Uri's safe, but is caught by Yoni. As it turns out, Uri is wearing the watch. Niki begs for the watch's return and reveals its history. He convinces Benny and Yoni--who are certain that keeping Holocaust jewelry is bad juju--but Uri viciously beats Niki for the betrayal, cutting off part of Niki's ears with a knife and deliberately cutting into Niki's eardrums. Waking up in a hospital, Niki discovers that doctors successfully repaired his earlobe but that he is now almost entirely deaf, to the extent that he no longer needs earplugs to tolerate noise since he can now barely hear. When a nurse hands over his things, he discovers that Uri has left him the watch. Niki delivers the watch to a grateful Maissner, and it is revealed that Maissner hired Ruthie as his assistant. When Niki and Ruthie have a moment alone together, Niki tells her he cannot hear her. Engrossed with the piano in the room, Niki begins to play. He gives a virtuoso performance--for the first time in years--playing an improved variation of Ruthie's original composition. Ending the performance, he points out that a key is flat and the piano needs tuning.

== Cast ==
- Leo Woodall as Niki White
- Dustin Hoffman as Harry Horowitz
- Havana Rose Liu as Ruthie Waymon
- Lior Raz as Uri
- Tovah Feldshuh as Marla Horowitz
- Jean Reno as Marius Maissner
- Nissan Sakira as Benny
- Gil Cohen as Yoni
- Jean Yoon as Dr. Madeline Richard
- Dumbfoundead as Sung
- Rek Lee as Jinwoo
- C. S. Lee as Yong
- Herbie Hancock as himself

== Production ==
In August 2024, Leo Woodall and Dustin Hoffman joined the cast of the film, with Daniel Roher set to direct from a screenplay he co-wrote with Robert Ramsey, and Black Bear Pictures and Elevation Pictures producing. In October 2024, Havana Rose Liu, Jean Reno, Lior Raz, and Tovah Feldshuh joined the cast.

Principal photography began in October 2024, in Toronto.

=== Music ===
The musical score was written by Will Bates, which was orchestrated and arranged by executive music producer Marius de Vries with Simon J. Li, while the piano parts were arranged by de Vries and Kait Dunton. De Vries also composed the "on screen music". Apart from his tracks throughout the film several classic jazz recordings can be heard played by Dave Brubeck ("Unsquare Dance"), Charles Mingus ("Body and Soul"), Nina Simone ("Sinnerman"), the crooner Dean Martin ("Almost Like Being in Love") and by Herbie Hancock, whose "Watermelon Man" is played with the opening credits, and who has a short appearance as himself at Harry's Shiva.

== Release ==
Tuner was released in limited theaters on May 22, 2026, before expanding wide on May 29. It had its world premiere at the 52nd Telluride Film Festival. It also screened at the Toronto International Film Festival on September 8, 2025. In September 2025, Black Bear Pictures acquired the U.S. distribution rights.

== Reception ==
=== Critical response ===
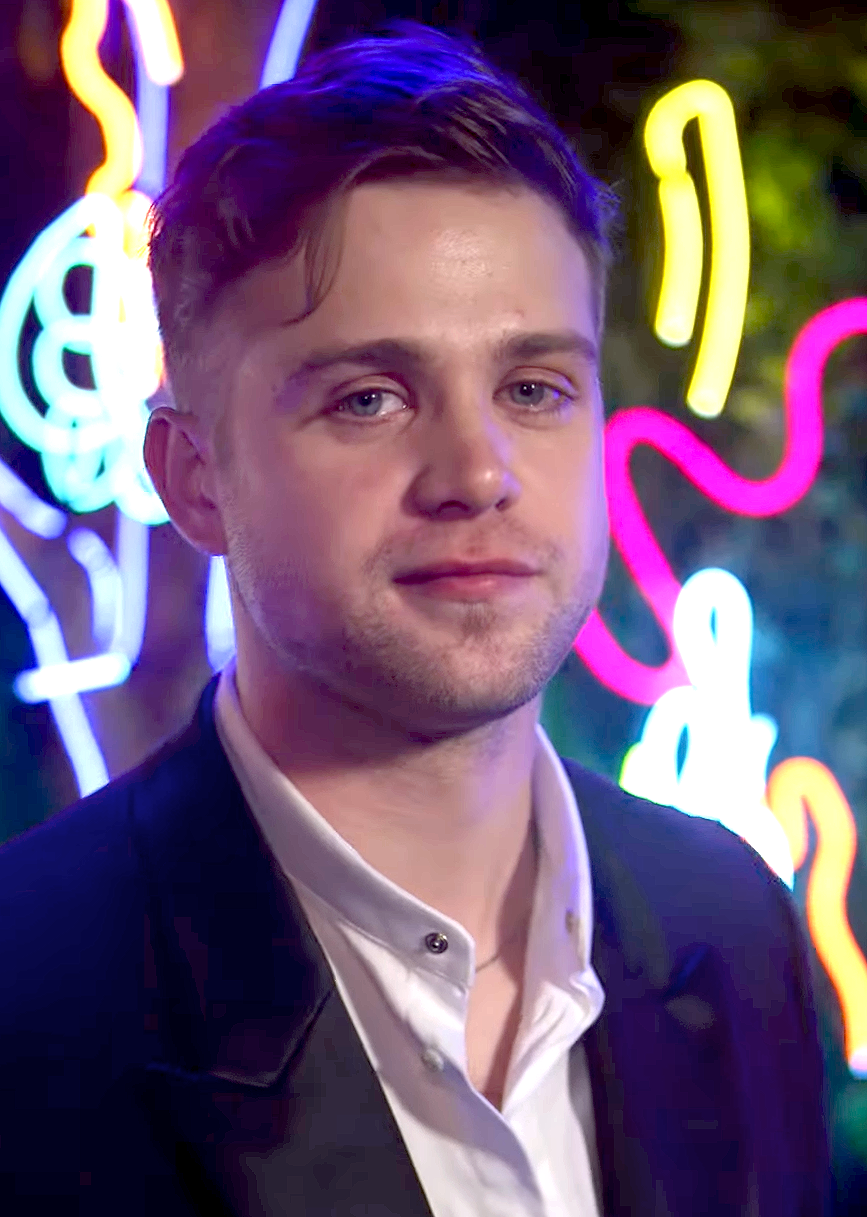
Leo Woodall's performance was highly praised by critics.

On the review aggregator website Rotten Tomatoes, 94% of 191 critics' reviews are positive, with an average rating of 7.6/10. The website's consensus reads: "Announcing Leo Woodall as a compelling star talent, Tuner enhances its nifty caper setup with a smart sense of humor and vivid characterizations." Metacritic, which uses a weighted average, assigned the film a score of 75 out of 100, based on 29 critics, indicating "generally favorable" reviews.

Cath Clarke in The Guardian gave the film 4/5 stars, writing: " [Woodall and Hoffman] are a real pleasure to watch in an easy, unforced drama that mixes romcom moments with a relaxed crime thriller. It’s like the Safdie brothers in chill out mode." In Empire, Harry Stainer also gave 4/5 stars, writing: "If there’s a flaw in this grand heist, it’s that Tuner can’t quite get away with all the genres it’s trying to pull off. Its crime antics are never as convincing as the drama and romance the film invests so heavily in, and as those increasingly far-fetched hijinks take centre stage in the third act, the film does lose some of its cool. ... It may not be 18-carat gold, but Tuner is still a damn good watch." Henry K. Miller, writing for the British Film Institute, called Tuner "a beautifully constructed film about beautifully constructed things: pianos, watches, concertos – and safes." For Variety, Peter Debruge wrote: "Hoffman isn’t in the movie as much as you might like, but when he’s on-screen, a script already brimming with warmth and humor ... foams over in the best possible way."

=== Accolades ===
The film was named to the Toronto International Film Festival's annual year-end Canada's Top Ten list for 2025. Roher and Ramsey won the Vancouver Film Critics Circle award for Best Screenplay for a Canadian Film at the Vancouver Film Critics Circle Awards 2025. Woodall was also nominated for Best Actor in a Canadian Film.
