= Thank You a Lot =

- Directed by: Matt Muir
- Written by: Matt Muir
- Produced by: Chris Ohlson
- Starring: Blake DeLong, James Hand, Robyn Rikoon
- Cinematography: Harrison Witt
- Edited by: Nevie Owens
- Music by: Hundred Visions, James Hand, Adam Blau
- Production companies: Clearing a Comma, LLC
- Distributed by: Gravitas Ventures
- Release dates: March 7, 2014 (SXSW); June 3, 2014 (DVD and VOD)
- Running time: 85 minutes
- Country: United States
- Language: English

Thank You a Lot is a 2014 American drama film directed by Matt Muir. Set in Austin, Texas, the film stars Blake DeLong as a struggling music manager who is forced to sign his estranged father, country music singer James Hand (played by the eponymous country musician).

The film premiered at the 2014 South by Southwest Film Festival as part of the Narrative Spotlight Section.

== Plot ==
Jack Hand (Blake DeLong) is a hustling music manager of a hip-hop artist and an indie rock band. Jack’s estranged musician father, James Hand, is a respected but reclusive songwriter living and working in Austin. Jack is pressured by his management company to sign his musician father to a deal or lose his job there.

== Cast ==
- Blake DeLong as Jack Hand
- James Hand as James Hand
- Robyn Rikoon as Allison
- Sonny Carl Davis as Frank
- Jeffrey Da'Shade Johnson as Desmond D
- Kaci Beeler as Sissy
- Indigo Rael as Steph

== Background and production ==
Muir began writing the script for actor and long-time friend Blake DeLong. After seeing James Hand perform in Austin, Muir said he decided to base a character on him:

I walked into a usual haunt on a Tuesday night and saw the most incredible live show of my life. There was a guy who looked like Hank Williams and sang like Lefty Frizzell, but was just… different. He finished his set, said “Thank you a lot,” and walked out. Then he was on NPR. Terri Gross asked him why he finally made a record at age 53. He said: “Ma’am, some people pray for rain… and some people dig a well.” I knew then, that James Hand had to be in my film.

With the script completed, Muir reached out to Hand, who agreed to play the fictionalized version of himself.

Principal photography took place over eighteen days in August, 2012, after a successful Kickstarter campaign. Most of the film was shot in and around Austin, Texas, and features appearances by various locals, including David Wingo, Andy Langer, Sam Wainwright Douglas, and Zell Miller III. All musical performances were captured live.

== Release and reception ==
The film has screened at South by Southwest Film Festival, Dallas International Film Festival and others, receiving mostly positive reviews. Austin Film Society-published site, Slackerwood, praised writer/director Muir and noted that DeLong and Hand had a chemistry that was "hilariously realistic". D Magazine and other outlets commended Hand on his performance despite a lack of acting experience. Truth On Cinema praised first-time director Muir and the "immersive on screen experience" he delivered.

For his work on this and other films, producer Chris Ohlson received the Independent Spirit Piaget Producers Award.
