= 2013 Huangpu River dead pigs incident =

16,000 dead pigs found in a Chinese river

Coordinates: 31°00′21″N 121°14′00″E

In early March 2013 over 16,000 dead pigs were found in the Shanghai Songjiang section of the Huangpu River, which supplies the city of Shanghai, China with some of its drinking water. The pigs were dumped by farmers in neighbouring Jiaxing, Zhejiang province, a major pig farming area that is upstream of Shanghai.

The BBC reported that some pig corpses were infected by porcine circovirus, in line with comments from Lu Hongzhou, Secretary of the Shanghai Public Health Clinical Center's Party committee.

== Overview ==
=== Before March 11 ===
In early March news stories began to appear online in China regarding the incident. On March 9 it was reported that the pig carcasses had not influenced the water supply for human use. Official sources held that the quality of Shanghai's drinking water remained unchanged. On March 11 reports emerged that the pigs were infected with disease, but none communicable to humans.

Some environmentalists claimed that the corpses of pigs were a common sight in the Huangpu River. They said that this had been going on for ten years and that the peak periods were when spring changed to summer and when summer changed to fall.

=== March 12 to 14 ===
As the story developed it became known that the carcasses came from upriver in Jiaxing, Zhejiang Province. Officials claimed that the pigs had frozen to death. Because of the enormous number of dead pigs, the carcasses were dumped into the river rather than being disposed of properly. Some livestock farmers were put under investigation. In other accounts, the farmers had thrown the bodies into the Huangpu River because burying the bodies was too expensive. As this story became known to the public the head of the Ministry of Civil Affairs stated that the incident was due to the high costs of cremation. A few days after this he said that there was no need to burn the bodies as long as they were disposed of in a responsible manner, such as burial. After several days of media reporting, only a few stray corpses remained in the river in Shanghai and the stench faded.

=== Aftermath ===
- By 3:00 PM on March 15, 8,354 pigs had been pulled from the river in Shanghai.
- By 3:00 PM on March 17, that number had increased to 9,460.
- By 3:00 PM on March 18, the number again had risen to 9,795. In addition, 4,664 pigs had been fished out of the river in Jiaxing. The total number of corpses was nearly 15,000.
- By March 20 10,395 pigs had been pulled from the river in Shanghai.

=== Bird flu ===
During this time, there was an outbreak of H7N9 avian flu in the Yangtze river delta. Regarding a possible link between the two events, Jiang Qingwu, department chair of Fudan University's School of Public Health, said that H7N9 chiefly occurred in birds and had not historically been found in swine. On the same day, Lu Hongzhou, Secretary of the Shanghai Public Health Clinical Center's Party committee, stated that there were indications that the pigs carried porcine circovirus. Porcine circovirus, he said, was spread among pigs but could not spread to humans. "No matter the strain, avian flu has never had any connection to porcine circovirus." However, the pigs themselves could serve as hosts in which viruses could hybridize.

== Public response ==
=== In defense ===
- On March 20, 2013, an agricultural expert said, "It's like if you were swimming in a pool and found a few dead flies. It may be gross, but just how much does it affect the water quality? Besides, the Huangpu is wide and the water is in constant motion."

=== Unease ===
- Author Li Mingsheng said, "This is not just an environmental issue, it's a question of public morality. It is not only the river water in Shanghai that has been polluted, but is the spirit of our people!"
- Pan Ting, a Chinese writer of youth poetry, expressed her suspicion about the incident on Sina Weibo and as a result her account was silenced. A plainclothes officer from the Domestic Security Protection Bureau visited her home to monitor her. Taiwanese actress and singer Yi Nengjing said on Weibo, “Which tastes worse: apples or dead pigs? Which is harder to manage: apples or powdered milk? Which is black: apples or the air? If an apple wasn't washed clean, is it the apple or the water that is dirty? There is a way of seeing things called 'out of focus,' but 'out of focus' isn't a bad thing, because the very object of focus itself has become indistinct.” Not long after this, Yi Nengjing's account was also silenced.
- Angel investor Charles Xue wrote a document entitled “Manzi's Ten Questions about China's Tap Water,” which he posted to Weibo. The document raised questions about water pollution and the Ministry of Environmental Protection.
- On March 15 the Jiaxing city government held a press conference in which it claimed that 3,601 carcasses had been pulled from the river in the preceding week. At the same time, many fisherman doing the work said that that number was only the tip of the iceberg and that 10,000 was perhaps closer to the truth.
- Internet users in Shanghai expressed that they did not want “free pork soup.” The masses hoped that the cleanup work would conclude with all haste and that officials would provide answers regarding the causes and effects of the incident.

== Official response ==
=== Ministry of Agriculture ===
The Ministry of Agriculture immediately sent investigative teams to Zhejiang and Shanghai on a mission to understand the facts of the matter, oversee its handling, and coordinate response work. Yu Kangzhen, National Chief Veterinarian, led the Ministry of Agriculture's supervisory team in Zhejiang to coordinate local science efforts.

=== Jiaxing, Zhejiang ===
The City of Jiaxing held a press release from 10:30 AM to 11:10 AM on March 15. At the conference Deputy Mayor Zhao Shumei described the situation:

1. It is not certain that all of the pig carcasses in the Huangpu River came from Jiaxing.
2. There was not evidence of an epidemic among animals in Jiaxing.
3. Water quality indicators in Jiaxing's water treatment facilities and at flows entering and exiting wetland areas remained normal. The water quality at the boundary between Zhejiang, Jiangsu and Shanghai was stable.

Possible causes of the incident included:

1. The absolute number of normal deaths among pigs was high. The number of pigs bred in Jiaxing was large, but the enterprises were small-scale, thus the density of pig farmers was very high. Small-scale swine enterprises were managed very poorly and so the number of deaths was high.
2. Most of the dead pigs were young. That winter and spring Jiaxing had seen somewhat more rain and snow than previous years, with more dramatic changes in temperature. Because piglets are less able to resist the cold, this weather may have triggered an outbreaks of diarrhea and other common diseases.
3. Understanding of livestock law was rather weak and the practice of dumping carcasses had never been fully corrected. As the weather became warmer carcasses which had sunk to the bottom of the river rose to the top and floated downstream.

== In film ==
The Chinese-American film director Cathy Yan was inspired to make her first film, Dead Pigs, by a story about the incident.
