= That's Not Us =

- Directed by: William Sullivan
- Written by: Derek Dodge; William Sullivan
- Produced by: Mark Berger; Sarah Wharton
- Starring: Mark Berger; Nicole Pursell; Elizabeth Gray; Sarah Wharton; David Rysdahl; Tommy Nelms
- Cinematography: Derek Dodge
- Edited by: William Sullivan
- Music by: Xander Singh
- Production companies: WCS Productions; Roger Dodger
- Release date: 21 June 2015 (Frameline Film Festival)
- Running time: 97 minutes
- Country: United States
- Language: English

That's Not Us is a 2015 American romantic comedy-drama film directed by William Sullivan, starring Mark Berger, Nicole Pursell, Elizabeth Gray, Sarah Wharton, David Rysdahl and Tommy Nelms.

== Cast ==
- Mark Berger as James
- Nicole Pursell as Jackie
- Elizabeth Gray as Liz
- Sarah Wharton as Alex
- David Rysdahl as Spencer
- Tommy Nelms as Dougie
- Angela Vitale as Angela

== Release ==
The film premiered at the Frameline Film Festival on 15 June 2015.

== Reception ==
Sarah Marloff of The Austin Chronicle wrote that "What makes this movie utterly charming is its ability to re-create honest and relatable relationship struggles onscreen."

David Lewis of SFGATE wrote that "The impressive ensemble cast makes this improvised affair come off quite naturally, a testament not only to their skills, but also to the direction of William Sullivan, who gives his actors a lot of rope but still keeps the modern story under control."

Heather Dockray of Uproxx rated the film "B+" and wrote, " So kudos to That's Not Us for showing us love's ugly profile. It’s unattractive and gross but always worth fighting for."

Jordan Mintzer of The Hollywood Reporter called the film a "trying LGBT-meets-mumblecore indie".
