= No Exit (2022 film) =

2022 American film by Damien Power

- Release poster
- Directed by: Damien Power
- Screenplay by: Andrew Barrer; Gabriel Ferrari
- Based on: No Exit by Taylor Adams
- Produced by: Scott Frank
- Starring: Havana Rose Liu; Danny Ramirez; David Rysdahl; Dale Dickey; Mila Harris; Dennis Haysbert
- Cinematography: Simon Raby
- Edited by: Andy Canny
- Music by: Marco Beltrami; Miles Hankins
- Production companies: 20th Century Studios; Flitcraft
- Distributed by: Hulu
- Release date: February 25, 2022
- Running time: 95 minutes
- Country: United States
- Language: English

No Exit is a 2022 American thriller film directed by Damien Power from a screenplay by Andrew Barrer and Gabriel Ferrari, based on the 2017 novel of the same name by Taylor Adams. It stars Havana Rose Liu as a recovering drug addict who discovers a kidnapping in progress while stranded at a rest stop during a blizzard. Danny Ramirez, David Rysdahl, Dale Dickey, and Dennis Haysbert co-star as the four suspects while Mila Harris plays the victim. No Exit was released on February 25, 2022, on Hulu by 20th Century Studios. It received mixed reviews from critics, who categorized it as a "reasonably diverting" popcorn movie.

== Plot ==
Recovering addict Darby Thorne learns that her mother is in the hospital after suffering a brain aneurysm, and is undergoing emergency surgery. Her estranged sister, Devon, warns her not to attempt to visit due to the strain her drug abuse has put on the family. Undeterred, she escapes rehab and attempts to drive to Salt Lake City. While stopped in the middle of the road, Darby is approached by local officer, Corporal Ron Hill, who tells her that the interstate is closed because of a developing blizzard and she must either turn back or stay at a local visitors center to wait out the storm. She agrees to stay at the visitors center with the only people inside being Ash, Lars, and a married couple, Ed and Sandi. Desperate to contact her family, Darby goes outside to find a cellphone signal and ends up discovering a kidnapped girl in a van belonging to one of the people inside.

Unable to determine who the kidnapper is, Darby returns inside while coming up with a plan. She attempts to send a text message to the police with details about the kidnapping, but is unsuccessful due to poor signal. Playing a round of Bullshit to pass the time, Darby uses her knowledge of the van's license plate to question the others about where they are from and heading to, ultimately deducing that Lars is the kidnapper. Sneaking through a damaged wall in a bathroom which is currently under construction, Darby returns to the van. Darby breaks in and talks to the girl, promising to save her. Unaware of her presence, Lars enters the van and reveals the girl's name to be Jay. It is revealed that Jay has a medical alert bracelet for Addison's disease, a rare condition which can cause an adrenaline overdose if the sufferer becomes too stressed. Inside, Ed grows suspicious of Lars' strange behavior. As Lars exits the van to retrieve food for Jay, Darby sneaks back inside the cabin through the hole in the wall.

In the bathroom, Darby runs into Ash, whom she tells about Jay and the kidnapping. Ash agrees to help her and modifies a nail gun found amongst the construction to fire without a safety. When Darby goes outside, however, Jay reveals that Ash and Lars are both accomplices in the kidnapping. Ash takes Darby back inside and threatens to kill her if she informs Ed or Sandi about Jay. He also confiscates her phone and deletes the unsent messages to the police. Outside, Jay cuts herself free and runs into the woods nearby. In the bathroom, Darby attacks Ash with a hammer, but he gains the upper hand. Lars returns through the hole in the wall and stops Ash from strangling Darby. In the struggle, Darby takes Ash's keys.

Ash and Lars force Darby to help them look for Jay. Ash reveals that they are transporting her to their "Uncle Kenny", who runs a human trafficking ring, while Lars ignorantly believes it to be "finding them better homes". Darby uses a flashlight to blind the kidnappers and runs away. Ash fires his gun, alerting Ed and Sandi. Ed and Sandi rush outside to find Jay unconscious in the snow. Darby returns and tells Ed and Sandi about the kidnappers. After locking the entrance, Ed negotiates with Ash and Lars, bluffing that he too has a gun. He offers to give them the car keys in exchange for the medicine Jay needs to survive. As Darby hides the keys in the snow outside, Ash and Lars cover the cabin in gasoline and threaten to burn it down if they don't give them Jay and the keys. Jay wakes up and identifies Sandi as her housekeeper. A flashback reveals that Sandi helped Ash and Lars take Jay from her home under the agreement she'd be ransomed, unaware of their true intentions. She agreed to meet with the kidnappers to give them Jay's medicine. In the present, Sandi confesses her involvement to Ed to pay off his gambling debts and lets Ash and Lars inside.

After learning that Darby is the only person who knows where the keys are, Ash kills Ed and Sandi, and uses a nail gun to pin Darby's wrist to a wall. Her phone receives a text message; Ash reads it and informs her that her mother has passed away. A subsequent text reveals that Darby's text to the police went through after all and that Corporal Ron is on his way to the cabin. When Ash threatens to hurt Jay, Darby reveals the keys' whereabouts. Ash gives his gun to Lars before leaving to search for the keys. Darby convinces Jay to bring her a hammer and to turn off the lights so she can attempt an escape.

Darby snorts heroin to numb her pain receptors and pulls the nail out of her wrist, freeing herself. With Lars distracted, she takes his gun as Ash returns. During a standoff with Darby holding Lars hostage, Jay hits Ash's nail gun with the hammer, thus shooting a nail in Lars' forehead. He survives, but stumbles forward and slips on Ed and Sandi's blood, forcing the nail all the way into his head, killing him almost instantly. With Ash distracted by the chaos, Darby and Jay rush to the car and attempt to drive away. Ash fires the nail gun at the tires, puncturing them, and causing the car to crash into a light pole. Ash attempts to cover up the crimes by lighting the cabin on fire before setting his sights on an unconscious Darby in the vehicle. Corporal Ron arrives, however Ash pretends to be a concerned citizen helping Darby. Darby shoots Ash, causing Ron to deem her as the threat and shoot her. Ash stretches out to take her weapon and shoots Ron, proceeding to finish him off with the nail gun. Ash returns to Darby and puts the gun to her head but Darby uses a screwdriver to stab his neck, killing him. She then crawls to Ron's body and uses his radio to call for help.

Some time later, Darby is back in the rehab center and tells the group she has been sober for 48 days. She is told she has a visitor, Devon.

== Cast ==
- Havana Rose Liu as Darby Thorne
- Danny Ramirez as Ash, one of the suspects
- David Rysdahl as Lars, one of the suspects
- Dale Dickey as Sandi, Ed's wife
- Mila Harris as Jay, the kidnapped girl
- Dennis Haysbert as Ed, a Marine and Sandi's husband
- Benedict Wall as Corporal Ron Hill
- Lisa Zhang as Devon Thorne, Darby's sister
- Hweiling Ow as Darby's mother

== Production ==
On October 10, 2017, it was announced that 20th Century Fox had optioned the feature rights to the 2017 novel by Taylor Adams. Logan writer Scott Frank was attached to develop and produce the film adaptation. By March 12, 2019, Damien Power had signed on to direct the film, with Ant-Man's Andrew Barrer and Gabriel Ferrari adapting the screenplay. On June 29, 2021, Danny Ramirez, Dennis Haysbert, Havana Rose Liu, David Rysdahl, Dale Dickey, and Mila Harris were confirmed to star and it was announced that production had wrapped in New Zealand. During post-production, Marco Beltrami and Miles Hankins composed the score.

== Release ==
Initially intended for a theatrical release by 20th Century Studios, the film was instead distributed by Hulu in the United States and released on February 25, 2022. It was released on Disney+ in international markets and Star+ in Latin America on the same date.

== Reception ==
=== Audience viewership ===
According to Whip Media's TV Time, No Exit was the sixth-most-streamed movie across all platforms, in the United States during the week of February 25 to February 27, 2022, and the ninth during the week of March 4 to March 6, 2022.

=== Critical response ===
On the review aggregator website Rotten Tomatoes, 62% of 76 critics' reviews are positive, with an average rating of 6/10. The website's consensus reads: "No Exit isn't quite a white-knuckle ride, but it may provide just enough mileage for viewers seeking reasonably diverting popcorn thrills." Metacritic, which uses a weighted average, assigned the film a score of 54 out of 100, based on 11 critics, indicating "mixed or average" reviews.

Frank Sheck of The Hollywood Reporter found that Damien Power skillfully manages to capture the plot mechanics through his direction, and complimented the performances of the actors, especially Liu's as a lead character. Jeff Ewing of Forbes praised the pace of the film and the performances of the actors, although stating that the film provides characters that are under-written, which creates a lack of emotional weight.

Lena Wilson of TheWrap complimented the diversity of the cast, and found the idea of a drug addict as a hero portrayed by an Asian actress original, but criticized the script that provides overused plot twists which diminishes their impact. Ross Bonaime of Collider gave the movie a C rating, complimenting the story and its suspense, while criticizing the inconstant level of violence and the development of Havana Rose's character.

Hoai-Ttran Bui of /Film rated the film 6.5 out of 10 and praised the performances of the actors, especially Liu's, and the direction that manages to create a threatening set, but found the characterization of the characters disheartening. Brian Tallerico of RogerEbert.com rated the movie a 2.5 out of 4 stars and found the performance of the whole cast convincing, but found the movie forgettable due to its lack of strong dialogues and stressful setting. Beatrice Loayza of The New York Times found Power's direction not sufficiently good enough to capture the tension of the movie, while claiming that the script carries out the plot with no effort, preventing the film to provide a real tension as a thriller.

=== Accolades ===
No Exit was nominated for Best Film Sound Editing at the 2022 Australian Screen Sound Guild Awards.
