= Cathy Yan =

American filmmaker (born 1986)

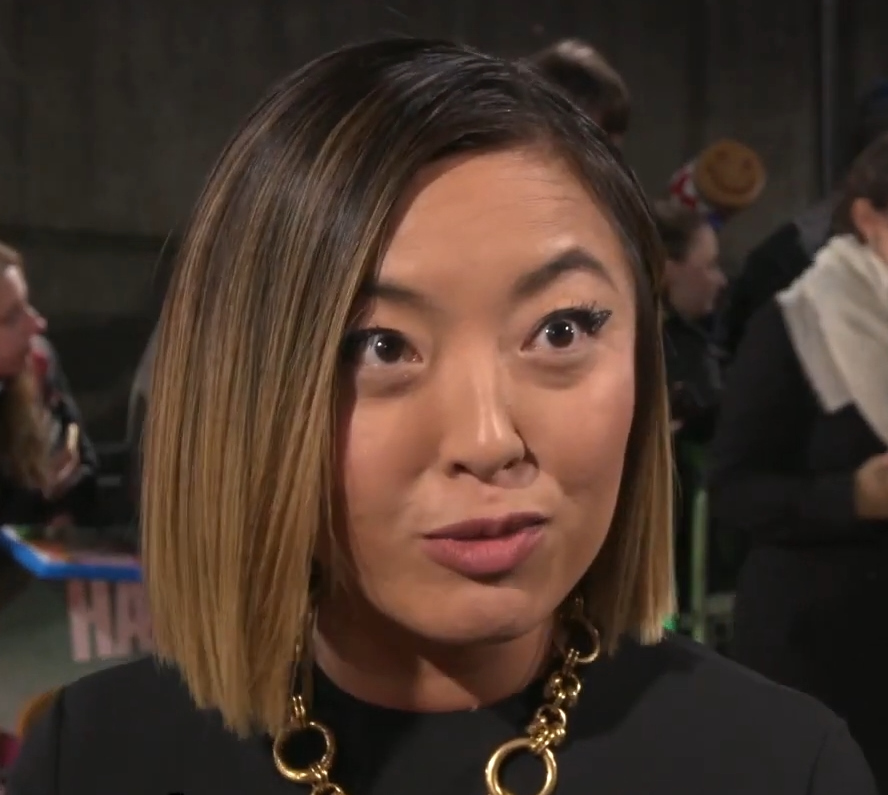
- Yan in 2020 at the Birds of Prey London Launch Party
- Born: 1986 (age 39–40); China
- Education: Princeton University; New York University
- Occupation: Filmmaker
- Years active: 2010–present

Chinese name
- Simplified Chinese: 阎羽茜
- Traditional Chinese: 閻羽茜
Transcriptions
Standard Mandarin
- Hanyu Pinyin: Yán Yǔxi

Cathy Yan Yuxi (Chinese: 阎羽茜; pinyin: Yán Yǔxi; born 1986) is a Chinese-born American film director, screenwriter, and producer. Her films include the comedy-drama film Dead Pigs (2018) and Birds of Prey (2020), the eighth installment of the DC Extended Universe.

== Early life and education ==
Yan was born in China and raised in Northern Virginia, near Washington, D.C. While her family was living in China, Yan's father was given a visa to study sociology in the U.S. Two years later her mother left for America, and Yan remained in China with her grandparents. At age four she was reunited with her parents in America.

As a child, Yan grew up with various creative outlets courtesy of her relatives and "deeply creative father". By age 8, Yan was carrying around a video camera, eager to express herself through art and through dancing as a choreographer. She moved to Hong Kong when she was fourteen years old, where she attended high school.

She graduated with an A.B. from the Princeton School of Public and International Affairs at Princeton University in 2008 and later graduated in 2016 from New York University's MBA/MFA dual degree program, where she studied at both the Stern School of Business and the Tisch School of the Arts.

== Career ==
Yan worked as a reporter for the Los Angeles Times and The Wall Street Journal in New York, Hong Kong and Beijing before turning to filmmaking.

After writing and directing several short films, Yan also shot a web-series and content for brands such as Armani, Subway, Spotify and The Innocence Project. By 2018, Yan made her feature debut with Dead Pigs. The film was inspired by the 2013 Huangpu River dead pigs incident, in which 16,000 dead pigs were found floating down the Huangpu River. Funded by Chinese investors, Yan shot the dark comedy in Shanghai with a bilingual crew then completed the film in New York; director Jia Zhangke executive produced. Dead Pigs premiered at the Sundance Film Festival and won a Special Jury Award for ensemble acting. Yan removed 12 minutes from the film in its wider February 2021 release on the streaming platform Mubi.

In April 2018, Yan was selected to direct the Harley Quinn DC Extended Universe superhero film Birds of Prey, based on the comic of the same name. The film was released on February 7, 2020 to positive reviews. Margot Robbie starred and co-produced and Christina Hodson wrote the script. Yan was the second woman and the first Asian woman to direct a DC film (or any US superhero film).

As of January 2020, Yan is working on directing and producing A24's film adaptation of Sour Heart, a collection of short stories by Jenny Zhang. Yan will co-write the script alongside Zhang for the autobiographical coming-of-age story about the immigrant experience of a young girl who moved from Shanghai to New York in the 90s.

In February 2021, Yan started developing an adaptation of Rachel Khong's short story, The Freshening. FilmNation Entertainment and Ali Wong were set to produce the feature, with Yan writing and directing.

In 2021, Yan directed an episode of the HBO drama series Succession called "The Disruption", in season three, episode three, for which she was nominated for the Primetime Emmy Award for Outstanding Directing for a Drama Series.

== Styles and themes ==
Yan's cinematic influences include Chen Kaige and Zhang Yimou. Since Yan's father was a big fan of the nineties era of Chinese cinema, Yan expanded into East Asian art-house cinema, which included Wong Kar-wai. Including American cinema, Yan appreciates the works of Robert Altman and Paul Thomas Anderson. Yan considers Dead Pigs as "a marriage of the American indie and classic Chinese indie tones she grew up with."

== Filmography ==
Short film

Year	Title	Director	Writer	Producer
2010	Phishing	No	No	Yes
2013	Last Night	Yes	Yes	No
2014	Dinosaur Rider	No	No	Yes
2014	Entropy	No	No	Yes
2014	Of Tooth and Time	No	No	Yes
2015	Humpty	No	No	Yes
2016	Down River	Yes	Yes	No
2016	According to My Mother	Yes	Yes	No
2017	Groomed	No	No	Yes

Feature film

Year	Title	Director	Writer
2018	Dead Pigs	Yes	Yes
2020	Birds of Prey	Yes	No
2026	The Gallerist	Yes	Yes

Television

Year	Title	Note
2021	Succession	Episode: "The Disruption"
