= Mayday (2021 film) =

2021 drama film

- Theatrical release poster
- Directed by: Karen Cinorre
- Written by: Karen Cinorre
- Produced by: Karen Cinorre; Jonah Disend; Sam Levy; Lucas Joaquin
- Starring: Grace Van Patten; Mia Goth; Juliette Lewis; Soko; Havana Rose Liu
- Cinematography: Sam Levy
- Edited by: Nicholas Ramirez
- Music by: Colin Stetson
- Production companies: Queen's Army; Complementary Colors; Secret Engine
- Distributed by: Magnolia Pictures
- Release dates: January 31, 2021 (Sundance); October 1, 2021 (United States)
- Running time: 100 minutes
- Country: United States
- Language: English
- Box office: $4,382

Mayday is a 2021 American action drama film, written and directed by Karen Cinorre in her feature directorial debut. The film stars Grace Van Patten, Mia Goth, Juliette Lewis, Soko and Havana Rose Liu.

Mayday had its world premiere at the Sundance Film Festival on January 31, 2021, where it was nominated for the Grand Jury Prize. The film was theatrically released in the United States on October 1, 2021.

== Plot ==
Ana works at a hotel with her friends Dimitri, a DJ, and cook Max. Ana and her coworker June comfort Marsha, a new bride who is experiencing cold feet. Ana is abused by the cruel head waiter. When a storm knocks out the power, Ana hears a voice spelling out "mayday" in a modified NATO Phonetic alphabet. Following the voice, she crawls into an oven and falls into the ocean.

Emerging on an unknown shore, Ana encounters Marsha, now brimming with confidence. She is in shock and realises she has no memories. A man dressed as a World War Two aviator emerges from the sea and says that his plane crashed in the ocean and that there's a war on. As the girls leave the beach the pilot is shot to death. Marsha takes Ana to a beached submarine where she and two other girls, Gert and Bea, live. Marsha explains that this land is a utopia where the girls can live without fear of male violence and predation.

Marsha tells Ana there are camps of women all over the island fighting and winning a war against the men trying to invade. Marsha shows Ana her telescope and shows her how to view the stars. The girls show Ana how to shoot a rifle, something she proves adept at. When the three others go swimming, Ana is too afraid to jump from a cliff and join them. She is attacked by the head waiter, now dressed as a soldier, but manages to escape.

Ana joins the girls in their ongoing mission: sending out fake distress signals to lure men to their death in the storm which surrounds the island. When a group of men manage to make it to the island alive, Ana finds herself unable to kill them. This alienates her from the bloodthirsty Marsha.

Ana begins having a recurring dream of herself driving a car through a tunnel.

While alone in the control room a distress call comes across the radio, Ana answers it and talks to the man, he tells her he isn't far from shore but they are having electrical problems. Ana plans to go out and swim to their ship but he tells her he is in a submarine that can't surface because of the issue but he promises to come back for her when it is fixed. Marsha catches her and knows she is lying when Ana says she was not talking to anyone on the radio.

Bea is captured by men and the girls run to rescue her. They find her being forced to dig her own grave and Ana hesitates but in the end has no choice but to shoot the men to save her friend.

Gert speaks to Marsha and questions why Bea would be out in the forest by herself and Marsha says she told her to go out there, she knew Ana's heart wasn't in it but now it is.

Ana goes out on patrol and finds a photographer and his squad. Ana prepares herself to shoot them but bombs suddenly start to drop, she runs away but is knocked out by a blast, she comes to and stumbles into a field with a large camp of soldiers and they engage in a dance routine; this is likely a hallucination, as she has killed them all. Ana wakes up on the ground and goes back to the submarine.

In the control room Marsha tells Ana she is a nobody and they scuffle. Ana tells her she has stopped hurting herself and started hurting others.

Out on patrol, this time Ana has no problem shooting soldiers she finds scaling the cliffs.

Marsha is unhappy that she is losing control of the group, during an air raid she refuses to come inside to comfort a hysterical Bea.

On patrol Ana finds an older man peeling potatoes, the chef Max. He tells her he is lost, she says she is too, they share a drink and he says he wants to be in a place where there is no war and suggests maybe they should go home. Ana lays her head against his knee and falls asleep.

She dreams again about driving through a tunnel but this time she sees a light from the end of the tunnel.

Ana wakes up to find she is asleep on Marsha's knee, they fight and Ana calls Marsha a monster.

Ana tells Gert she wants to leave the island that she doesn't think she is meant to be here, Gert agrees to help her.

Ana hears a radio broadcast by the man on the submarine, he says he's dying from the fumes and apologises for not being able to come back to save her. He says he has ‘never had much luck with the ladies’ and tells her she should say goodbye; Ana replies, saying she's ‘not that kind of girl’, echoing a conversation they had at the start of the movie. The memory of the conversation makes her realise it is Dimitri, and she suddenly remembers everything.

Gert tells her she definitely does not belong here, and sends her to meet with June, now a mechanic, who she tells about her plan to leave the island. June warns her that she is like a star, and if she leaves it will be like a star dying; everything around it gets pulled in, and they all disappear, everyone on the island will be snuffed out of existence. June also tells Ana that to get through the storm she will need precise calculations.

Ana returns to the sub and tells Gert and Bea she has changed her mind and isn't leaving, but Gert reveals they already know what will happen and they still want her to try. Ana asks them to come with her but they tell her they can't. They tell Ana she can go and protect other girls from becoming like them, victims of men.

They then show Ana that they have already spoken to all of the other camps on the island and they are all in support of Ana leaving.

Gert, Bea, June and Ana, with the help of the other camps via the radio, track the storms and formulate a plan to get Ana through the storm and back to the point she entered.

They think they have kept it all a secret from Marsha, but she has actually been listening to them via the radio. She confronts Ana and tells her she can not believe that after everything she has given her, after making her a hero, she wants to go back to a kitchen. Ana replies that she has made her into a psychopath and Marsha says it is the same thing. She tells Ana that she is going back to so much darkness and Ana tells her that in the dark she will see the stars.

Ana and Bea lie in bed, Ana tells Bea she does not want to leave her, and Bea says she will go first and to close her eyes, Bea then disappears.

June, Gert and Bea check all of the parameters are correct and tell Ana it is time.

They watch from the control room as Ana jumps into the sea and swims towards the storm but she gets caught in a rip tide, is pulled under and starts to drown. Marsha gets on the radio and encourages her repeating the same message Ana heard on the radio in her dream. Ana is able to float to where she needs to be and finds Dimitri floating there; as she reaches him, she is transported back to the hotel.

The film ends with Ana walking into the banquet hall where Dimitri is DJing. She approaches the microphone and opens her mouth to sing.

== Cast ==
- Grace Van Patten as Ana
- Mia Goth as Marsha
- Juliette Lewis as June
- Soko as Gert
- Havana Rose Liu as Bea
- Théodore Pellerin as Dimitri
- Zlatko Buric as Max

== Production ==
In November 2019, it was announced Grace Van Patten, Mia Goth, Juliette Lewis, Soko and Havana Rose Liu had joined the cast of the film, with Karen Cinorre directing from a screenplay she wrote.

Principal photography began in November 2019. The film in its entirety was shot in Croatia, namely towns of Pula, Rijeka and Opatija.

== Release ==
The film had its world premiere at the 2021 Sundance Film Festival on January 31, 2021. In June 2021, Magnolia Pictures acquired distribution rights to the film.

=== Critical response ===
On Rotten Tomatoes, 50% of 66 reviews are positive, and the average rating is 5.80/10. The critics' consensus on the website reads: "Viewers may not be left sending out distress calls, but despite interesting ideas and a solid setup, Mayday leaves a frustrating amount of potential untapped." On Metacritic, the film has a score of 45 based on reviews from 6 critics, indicating "mixed or average reviews".
