= Havana Rose Liu =

American actress and model (born 1997)

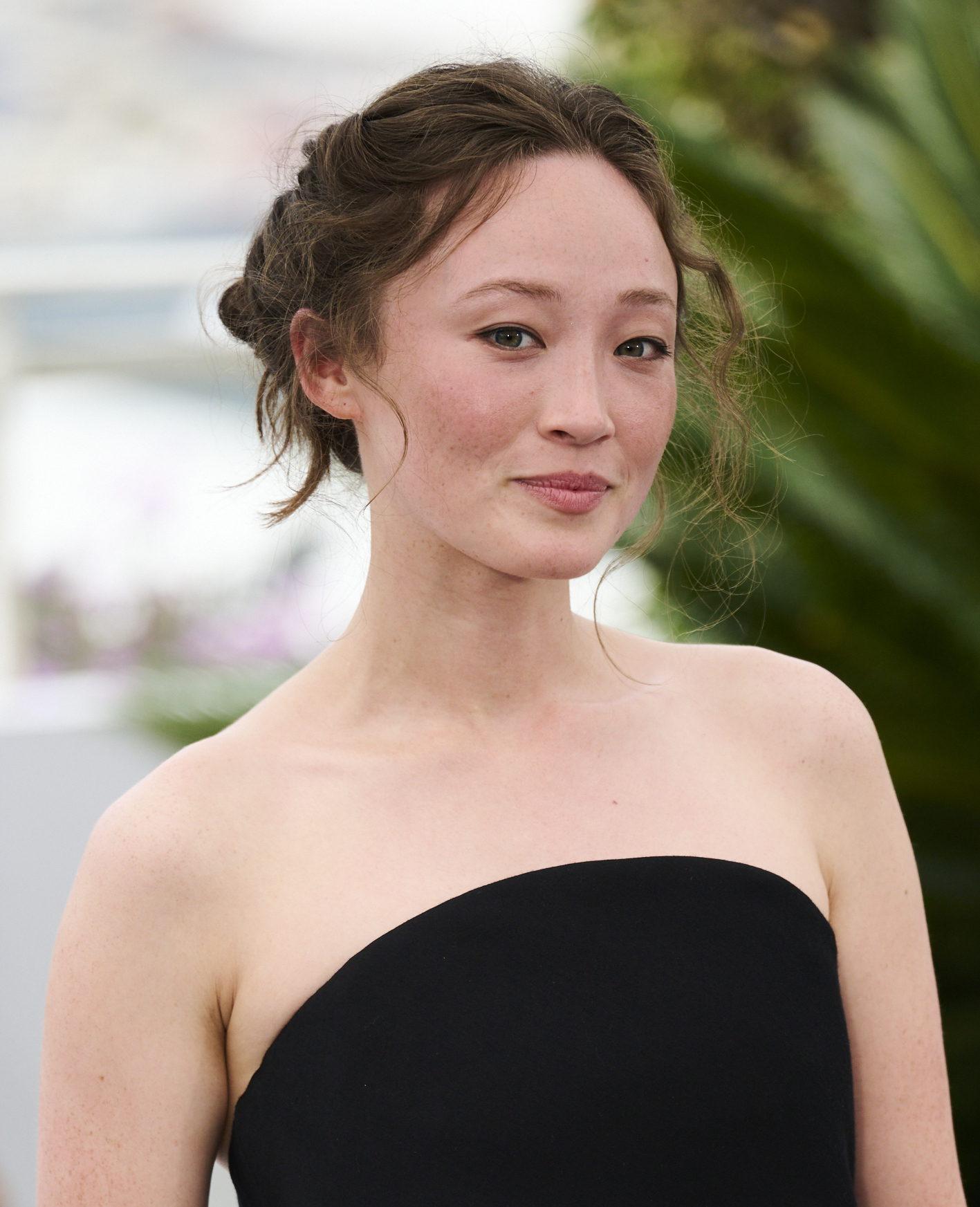
- Liu in 2026
- Born: September 30, 1997 (age 29); New York City, U.S.
- Education: New York University (BA)
- Occupations: Model; actress
- Years active: 2018–present
- Modeling information
- Height: 5 ft 4.5 in (164 cm)
- Hair color: Dark Brown
- Eye color: Green
- Agency: IMG Models (New York)

Havana Rose Liu (born September 30, 1997) is an American actress and model. She is best known for her roles in the comedy film Bottoms and the crime thriller Tuner.

== Early life and education ==
Liu was born and raised in the Brooklyn borough of New York City. She is the daughter of Carley Roney and David Liu, the founders of the wedding planning site The Knot, now known as the lifestyle company The Knot Worldwide. Liu has two younger siblings. Liu is of Irish descent through her mother and of Chinese descent through her father. She began her artistic career as a dancer when she was a child. Liu studied the intersection of art, activism and wellness practices at New York University, and graduated in 2019 with a Bachelor of Arts degree.

== Career ==
Prior to her street cast, Liu had never expected to become an actress. In September 2020, Liu appeared on the cover of Vogue Italia.

Liu was first cast in a feature-length film in 2019, and so made her acting debut in 2021 with a supporting role in the action drama film Mayday. That year she also made her television debut with a minor role in the Netflix comedy drama series The Chair. In 2022, Liu starred in two films: first in a supporting role in Josephine Decker's romantic drama film The Sky Is Everywhere, then in a lead role in the thriller film No Exit. Although the films received mixed reviews from critics, her performance as a recovering drug addict in No Exit was praised. She next starred in Emma Seligman's 2023 comedy film Bottoms about two teenaged lesbians who start an all-girls fight club at their high school in the hopes of hooking up with other girls, alongside Rachel Sennott, Ayo Edebiri and Kaia Gerber. She is next set to star in Her Private Hell, alongside Sophie Thatcher.

In 2025, Liu was a part of thriller film Tuner which required her to study piano. In 2026, she joined the cast of the Elden Ring film, a live-action adaptation of the eponymous game. It is set for a March 2028 release.

== Personal life ==
Liu is pansexual, having stated this at the world premiere of her film Bottoms.

== Filmography ==
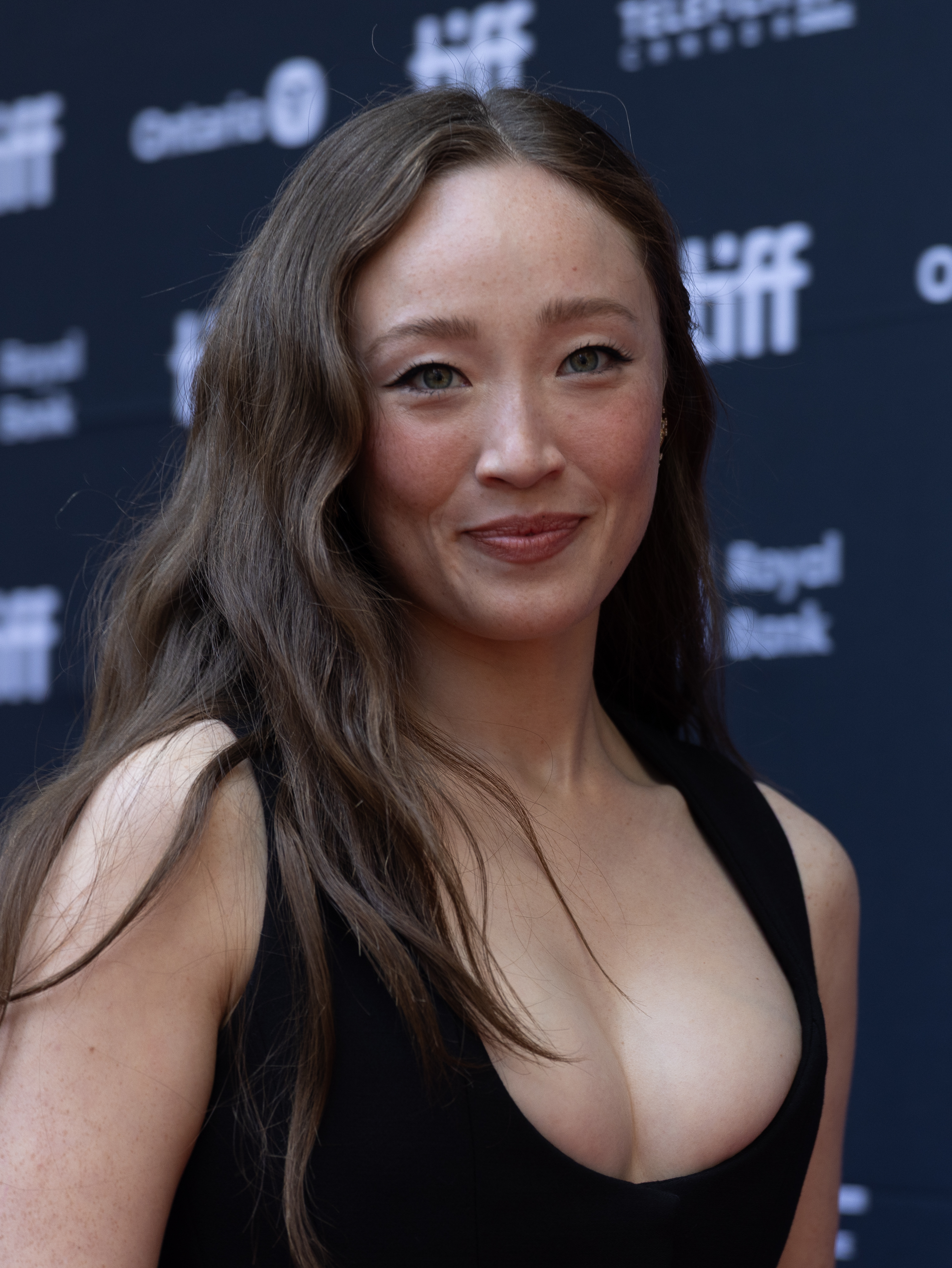
Liu at the 2025 Toronto International Film Festival

Key
†	Denotes films that have not yet been released

=== Film ===
Year	Title	Role	Notes
2018	Girls Will Be	Rome	Short film
2021	Mayday	Bea	
2022	Wake	Mary	Short film
2022	The Sky Is Everywhere	Bailey Walker	
2022	No Exit	Darby Thorne	
2023	Bottoms	Isabel	
2024	Afraid	Melody / AIA (voice)	
2025	Lurker	Shai	
2025	Tuner	Ruthie Waymon	
2025	Oh. What. Fun.	Lizzie Wang-Wasserman	
2026	Power Ballad	Marcia	
2026	Her Private Hell	Dominique	
2026	The Debut	Twisty	
2028	Elden Ring †	TBA	Post-production
TBA	Peaches †	Bing Bing	Post-production
TBA	Untitled Arkasha Stevenson film †		Post-production

=== Television ===
Year	Title	Role	Notes
2021	The Chair	Sarah	2 episodes
2023	American Horror Stories	Sasha	Episode: "Organ"
2025	Hal & Harper	Abby	Main cast

=== Theater ===
Year	Production	Role	Venue	Ref.
2025	All Nighter	Lizzy	The Newman Mills Theater, Off-Broadway	

=== Music videos ===
Year	Title	Singer
2025	"Ankles"	Lucy Dacus
