= The Families Stone =

Upcoming film by Thomas Bezucha

- Directed by: Thomas Bezucha
- Written by: Thomas Bezucha
- Based on: Characters by Thomas Bezucha
- Produced by: Michael London; Shannon Gaulding; Sarah Jessica Parker; Alison Benson
- Starring: Claire Danes; Rachel McAdams; Dermot Mulroney; Craig T. Nelson; Sarah Jessica Parker; Luke Wilson; Jean Smart
- Production companies: Groundswell Productions; Pretty Matches Productions
- Distributed by: Searchlight Pictures
- Release date: November 19, 2027
- Country: United States
- Language: English

The Families Stone is an upcoming American Christmas comedy-drama film written and directed by Thomas Bezucha. The sequel to the 2005 film The Family Stone, it stars an ensemble cast, including Claire Danes, Rachel McAdams, Dermot Mulroney, Craig T. Nelson, Sarah Jessica Parker, Luke Wilson, and Jean Smart.

The Families Stone is scheduled to be released in the United States by Searchlight Pictures on November 19, 2027.

== Premise ==
Twenty years after their mother's passing, the Stone family reunited for Christmas only to face the season's biggest surprise: their father has unexpectedly invited the woman's he's fallen in love with to meet the family.

== Cast ==
- Claire Danes as Julie Morton
- Rachel McAdams as Amy Stone
- Dermot Mulroney as Everett Stone
- Craig T. Nelson as Kelly Stone
- Sarah Jessica Parker as Meredith Morton
- Luke Wilson as Ben Stone
- Tyrone Giordano as Thad Stone
- Brian White as Patrick Thomas
- Elizabeth Reaser as Susannah Stone Trousdale
- Paul Schneider as Brad Stevenson
- Jean Smart

== Production ==
In September 2026, it was announced that the sequel to The Family Stone (2005) was in development, with Thomas Bezucha returning as the writer and director, and the cast returning from the first film. The title was announced to be The Families Stone. Later that month Jean Smart joined the cast. Sarah Jessica Parker, Rachel McAdams, Dermot Mulroney were spotted filming in New York City on October 20, 2026.

== Release ==
The Families Stone is scheduled to be released in the United States by Searchlight Pictures on November 19, 2027.

== See also ==
- List of films featuring the deaf and hard of hearing
- List of Christmas films
