= List of awards and nominations received by Rachel McAdams =

Rachel McAdams awards and nominations
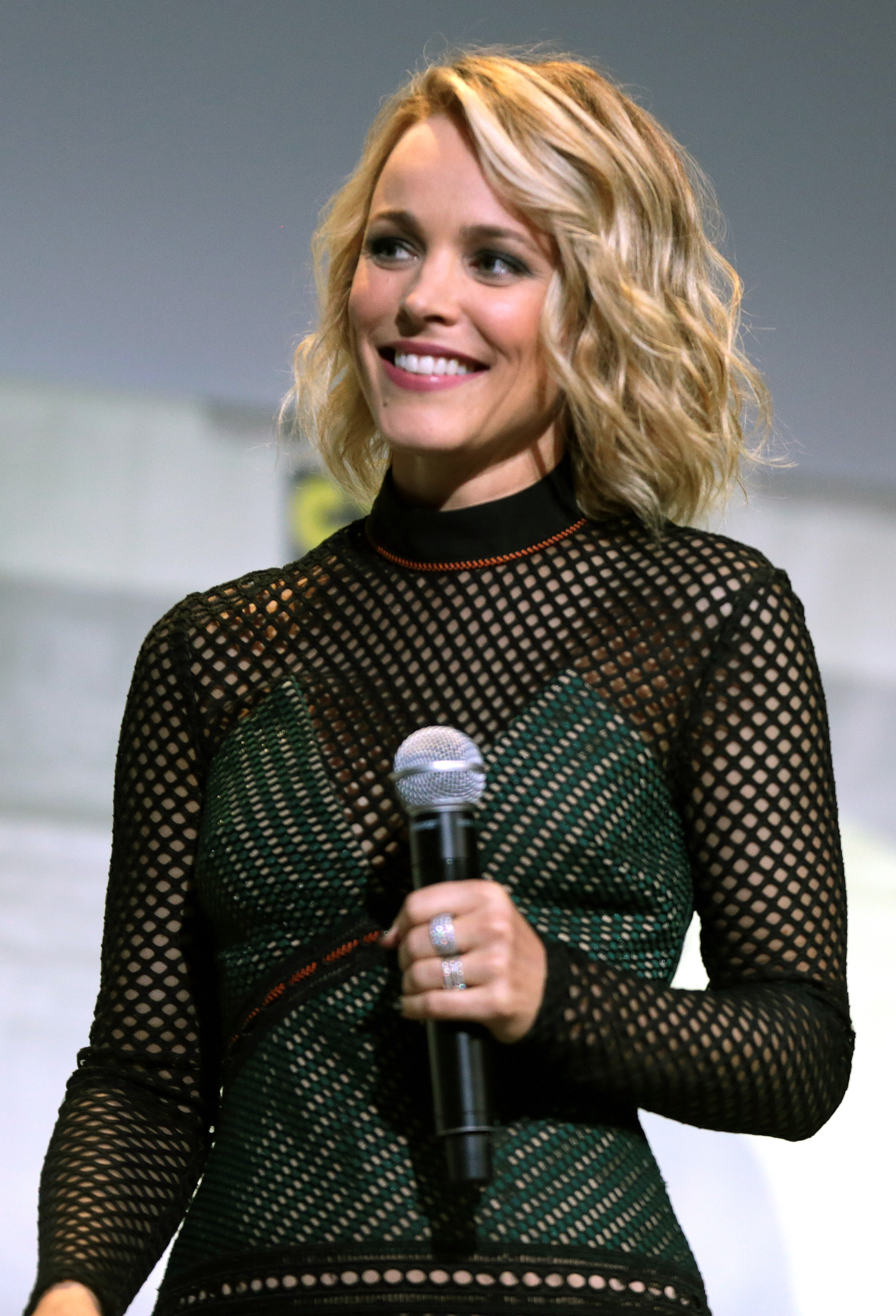
- McAdams at the 2016 San Diego Comic-Con
Awards and nominations
| Award | Wins | Nominations |
| Academy Awards | 0 | 1 |
| BAFTA Awards | 0 | 1 |
| Critics' Choice Awards | 1 | 5 |
| Independent Spirit Awards | 1 | 1 |
| SAG Awards | 1 | 3 |
| Tony Awards | 0 | 1 |

Totals (Note: Certain award groups do not simply award one winner. They acknowledge several different recipients, have runners-up, and have third place. Since this is a specific recognition and is different from losing an award, runner-up mentions are considered wins in this award tally. For simplification and to avoid errors, each award in this list has been presumed to have had a prior nomination.)
- Wins: 32
- Nominations: 108

The following is a list of awards and nominations received by Rachel McAdams.

Rachel McAdams is a Canadian actress. Known for both her dramatic and comedic roles on stage and screen, she has received numerous accolades throughout her career including a Critics' Choice Movie Award, an Independent Spirit Award and a Screen Actors Guild Award as well as nominations for a Academy Award, a British Academy Film Award, a Critics' Choice Television Award and a Tony Award. She has also received several audience awards including three MTV Movie Awards, and six Teen Choice Awards with nominations for three People's Choice Awards.

McAdams gained acclaim for her role as Regina George in the teen comedy Mean Girls (2004) for which she won the MTV Movie Award for Best Breakthrough Performance. That same year she starred as the lead in the romance drama The Notebook (2004) earning several Teen Choice Awards including Choice Movie Actress in a Drama Film. In 2005 she was nominated for the BAFTA Rising Star Award. During this time she acted in a string of successful films such as the raunchy romantic comedy film Wedding Crashers (2005), the family drama The Family Stone (2005), the psychological thriller Red Eye (2005), the romance drama The Time Traveler's Wife (2009), the period mystery action film Sherlock Holmes (2009), the fantasy romance comedy Midnight in Paris (2011), the romance drama The Vow (2012), and the superhero film Doctor Strange (2016).

In 2015, she portrayed journalist Sacha Pfeiffer in the Tom McCarthy directed biographical drama Spotlight for which she earned nominations for the Academy Award for Best Supporting Actress, the Critics' Choice Movie Award for Best Supporting Actress, and the Screen Actors Guild Award for Outstanding Actress in a Supporting Role. She won an Independent Spirit Award and the Screen Actors Guild Award along with the film's ensemble. In 2018, she acted in the comedic action film Game Night for which she was nominated for the Critics' Choice Movie Award for Best Actress in a Comedy. She portrayed a compassionate mother in the coming-of-age film Are You There God? It's Me, Margaret. (2023) for which she earned numerous critics awards and nominations including a win for the Los Angeles Film Critics Association Award for Best Supporting Actress.

On television, she portrayed a Detective Sergeant in the second season of the HBO mystery-anthology series True Detective (2015) earning a nomination for the Critics' Choice Television Award for Best Actress in a Movie/Miniseries. She guest starred as herself in the FXX comedy series Dave (2023) earning a Hollywood Critics Association nomination. On stage, she made her Broadway debut playing a struggling single mother in the Amy Herzog play Mary Jane where she received a nomination for the Tony Award for Best Actress in a Play.

== Major Associations ==
=== Academy Awards ===
| Year | Category | Nominated work | Result | Ref. |
|---|---|---|---|---|
| 2016 | Best Supporting Actress | Spotlight | Nominated | |

=== BAFTA Awards ===
| Year | Category | Nominated work | Result | Ref. |
British Academy Film Awards
| 2006 | Rising Star Award | —N/a | Nominated | |

=== Critics' Choice Awards ===
| Year | Category | Nominated work | Result | Ref. |
Critics' Choice Movie Awards
| 2016 | Best Supporting Actress | Spotlight | Nominated | |
| 2016 | Best Acting Ensemble | Spotlight | Won | |
| 2019 | Best Actress in a Comedy | Game Night | Nominated | |
Critics' Choice Television Awards
| 2016 | Best Actress in a Movie/Miniseries | True Detective | Nominated | |
Critics' Choice Super Awards
| 2026 | Best Actress in a Horror Movie | Send Help | Pending | |

=== Screen Actors Guild Awards ===
| Year | Category | Nominated work | Result | Ref. |
|---|---|---|---|---|
| 2012 | Outstanding Cast in a Motion Picture | Midnight in Paris | Nominated | |
| 2016 | Outstanding Actress in a Supporting Role | Spotlight | Nominated | |
| 2016 | Outstanding Cast in a Motion Picture | Spotlight | Won | |

=== Tony Awards ===
| Year | Category | Nominated work | Result | Ref. |
|---|---|---|---|---|
| 2025 | Best Actress in a Play | Mary Jane | Nominated | |

== Miscellaneous Awards ==
| Organizations | Year | Category | Work | Result | Ref. |
|---|---|---|---|---|---|
| Broadway.com Audience Awards | 2024 | Favorite Performance of the Year (Play) | Mary Jane | Nominated | |
| Broadway.com Audience Awards | 2024 | Favorite Leading Actress in a Play | Mary Jane | Won | |
| Broadway.com Audience Awards | 2024 | Favorite Breakthrough Performance (Female) | Mary Jane | Won | |
| Gemini Awards | 2004 | Best Actress in a Supporting Role in a Dramatic Series | Slings and Arrows (episode: "A Mirror up to Nature") | Won | |
| Gemini Awards | 2006 | Best Actress in a Guest Role in a Dramatic Series | Slings and Arrows (episode: "Season's End") | Nominated | |
| Genie Awards | 2002 | Best Performance by an Actress in a Supporting Role | Perfect Pie | Nominated | |
| Gotham Independent Film Awards | 2015 | Ensemble Performance | Spotlight | Won | |
| Gotham Independent Film Awards | 2023 | Outstanding Supporting Performance | Are You There God? It's Me, Margaret. | Nominated | |
| Independent Spirit Awards | 2015 | Robert Altman Award (Best Ensemble) | Spotlight | Won | |
| MTV Movie Awards | 2005 | Best Breakthrough Female Performance | Mean Girls | Won | |
| MTV Movie Awards | 2005 | Best Villain | Mean Girls | Nominated | |
| MTV Movie Awards | 2005 | Best On-Screen Team (shared with Lindsay Lohan, Lacey Chabert and Amanda Seyfried) | Mean Girls | Won | |
| MTV Movie Awards | 2005 | Best Female Performance | The Notebook | Nominated | |
| MTV Movie Awards | 2005 | Best Kiss (shared with Ryan Gosling) | The Notebook | Won | |
| MTV Movie Awards | 2006 | Best Performance | Red Eye | Nominated | |
| MTV Movie Awards | 2012 | Best Kiss (shared with Channing Tatum) | The Vow | Nominated | |
| People's Choice Awards | 2013 | Favorite Drama Movie Actress | The Vow | Nominated | |
| People's Choice Awards | 2013 | Favorite On-Screen Chemistry (shared with Channing Tatum) | The Vow | Nominated | |
| People's Choice Awards | 2016 | Favorite Dramatic Movie Actress | Spotlight | Nominated | |
| Teen Choice Awards | 2004 | Choice Movie Actress: Comedy | Mean Girls | Nominated | |
| Teen Choice Awards | 2004 | Choice Movie: Blush | Mean Girls | Nominated | |
| Teen Choice Awards | 2004 | Choice Movie: Hissy Fit | Mean Girls | Nominated | |
| Teen Choice Awards | 2004 | Choice Movie: Villain | Mean Girls | Nominated | |
| Teen Choice Awards | 2004 | Choice Movie Fight/Action Sequence | Mean Girls | Nominated | |
| Teen Choice Awards | 2004 | Choice Movie: Female Breakout Star | Mean Girls and The Notebook | Nominated | |
| Teen Choice Awards | 2004 | Choice Female Hottie | Herself | Nominated | |
| Teen Choice Awards | 2004 | Choice Female Fashion Icon | Herself | Nominated | |
| Teen Choice Awards | 2005 | Choice Movie Actress: Drama | The Notebook | Won | |
| Teen Choice Awards | 2005 | Choice Movie: Chemistry (shared with Ryan Gosling) | The Notebook | Won | |
| Teen Choice Awards | 2005 | Choice Movie: Dance Scene (shared with Ryan Gosling) | The Notebook | Nominated | |
| Teen Choice Awards | 2005 | Choice Movie: Liplock (shared with Ryan Gosling) | The Notebook | Won | |
| Teen Choice Awards | 2005 | Choice Movie Love Scene (shared with Ryan Gosling) | The Notebook | Won | |
| Teen Choice Awards | 2006 | Choice Movie: Scream | Red Eye | Nominated | |
| Teen Choice Awards | 2006 | Choice Movie Actress: Comedy | Wedding Crashers and The Family Stone | Won | |
| Teen Choice Awards | 2006 | Choice Movie: Liplock (shared with Owen Wilson) | Wedding Crashers | Nominated | |
| Teen Choice Awards | 2010 | Choice Movie Actress: Action | Sherlock Holmes | Won | |
| Teen Choice Awards | 2010 | Choice Movie Actress: Sci-Fi | The Time Traveler's Wife | Nominated | |
| Teen Choice Awards | 2012 | Choice Movie Actress: Drama | The Vow | Nominated | |
| Teen Choice Awards | 2012 | Choice Movie Actress: Romance | The Vow | Nominated | |
| Teen Choice Awards | 2012 | Choice Movie: Liplock (shared with Channing Tatum) | The Vow | Nominated | |
| Teen Choice Awards | 2017 | Choice Movie Actress: Fantasy | Doctor Strange | Nominated | |
| Santa Barbara International Film Festival | 2015 | American Riviera Award (shared with Michael Keaton and Mark Ruffalo) | Spotlight | Won | |
| Satellite Awards | 2005 | Best Supporting Actress Comedy or Musical | The Family Stone | Nominated | |
| Satellite Awards | 2011 | Best Supporting Actress Comedy or Musical | Midnight in Paris | Nominated | |
| Satellite Awards | 2015 | Best Supporting Actress Comedy or Musical | Spotlight | Nominated | |
| Saturn Awards | 2005 | Best Actress | Red Eye | Nominated | |
| Saturn Awards | 2009 | Best Supporting Actress | Sherlock Holmes | Nominated | |
| ShowWest | 2005 | Supporting Actress of the Year | Mean Girls / The Notebook | Won | |
| ShowWest | 2009 | Female Star of the Year | —N/a | Won | |

== Critics Associations ==
| Year | Association | Category | Nominated work | Result | Ref. |
|---|---|---|---|---|---|
| 2015 | Boston Online Film Critics Association | Best Ensemble | Spotlight | Won | |
| 2015 | Boston Society of Film Critics | Best Cast | Spotlight | Won | |
| 2015 | Denver Film Critics Society | Best Supporting Actress | Spotlight | Nominated | |
| 2015 | Detroit Film Critics Society | Best Ensemble | Spotlight | Won | |
| 2015 | Florida Film Critics Circle | Best Cast | Spotlight | Won | |
| 2015 | New York Film Critics Online | Best Ensemble Cast | Spotlight | Won | |
| 2015 | San Diego Film Critics Society | Best Ensemble | Spotlight | Nominated | |
| 2015 | Washington D.C. Area Film Critics Association | Best Ensemble | Spotlight | Won | |
| 2023 | Astra Film Awards | Best Supporting Actress | Are You There God? It's Me, Margaret. | Nominated | |
| 2023 | Austin Film Critics Association | Best Supporting Actress | Are You There God? It's Me, Margaret. | Nominated | |
| 2023 | Chicago Film Critics Association | Best Supporting Actress | Are You There God? It's Me, Margaret. | Nominated | |
| 2023 | Chicago Indie Critics | Best Supporting Actress | Are You There God? It's Me, Margaret. | Nominated | |
| 2023 | Denver Film Critics Society | Best Supporting Actress | Are You There God? It's Me, Margaret. | Nominated | |
| 2023 | DiscussingFilm Critics Awards | Best Supporting Actress | Are You There God? It's Me, Margaret. | Won | |
| 2023 | Florida Film Critics Circle | Best Supporting Actress | Are You There God? It's Me, Margaret. | Won | |
| 2023 | Georgia Film Critics Association | Best Supporting Actress | Are You There God? It's Me, Margaret. | Nominated | |
| 2023 | Hawaii Film Critics Society | Best Supporting Actress | Are You There God? It's Me, Margaret. | Nominated | |
| 2023 | Hollywood Critics Association | Best Supporting Actress - Midseason | Are You There God? It's Me, Margaret. | Nominated | |
| 2023 | Hollywood Critics Association | Best Guest Actress in a Comedy Series | Dave | Nominated | |
| 2023 | Houston Film Critics Society | Best Supporting Actress | Are You There God? It's Me, Margaret. | Nominated | |
| 2023 | Indiana Film Journalists Association | Best Supporting Performance | Are You There God? It's Me, Margaret. | Nominated | |
| 2023 | Kansas City Film Critics Circle | Best Supporting Actress | Are You There God? It's Me, Margaret. | Runner-up | |
| 2023 | Las Vegas Film Critics Society | Best Supporting Actress | Are You There God? It's Me, Margaret. | Nominated | |
| 2023 | Latino Entertainment Journalists Association | Best Supporting Actress | Are You There God? It's Me, Margaret. | Nominated | |
| 2023 | Los Angeles Film Critics Association | Best Supporting Performance | Are You There God? It's Me, Margaret. | Won | |
| 2023 | Michigan Movie Critics Guild | Best Supporting Actress | Are You There God? It's Me, Margaret. | Nominated | |
| 2023 | Minnesota Film Critics Alliance | Best Supporting Actress | Are You There God? It's Me, Margaret. | Runner-up | |
| 2023 | Music City Film Critics Association | Best Supporting Actress | Are You There God? It's Me, Margaret. | Nominated | |
| 2023 | National Society of Film Critics | Best Supporting Actress | Are You There God? It's Me, Margaret. | Runner-up | |
| 2023 | Greater Western New York Film Critics Association | Best Supporting Performance | Are You There God? It's Me, Margaret. | Nominated | |
| 2023 | New York Film Critics Circle | Best Supporting Actress | Are You There God? It's Me, Margaret. | Nominated | |
| 2023 | Oklahoma Film Critics Circle | Best Supporting Actress | Are You There God? It's Me, Margaret. | Runner-up | |
| 2023 | Online Association of Female Film Critics | Best Supporting Actress | Are You There God? It's Me, Margaret. | Nominated | |
| 2023 | Online Film and Television Association | Best Supporting Actress | Are You There God? It's Me, Margaret. | Runner-up | |
| 2023 | Online Film Critics Society | Best Supporting Actress | Are You There God? It's Me, Margaret. | Nominated | |
| 2023 | Phoenix Critics Circle | Best Supporting Actress | Are You There God? It's Me, Margaret. | Nominated | |
| 2023 | Portland Critics Association | Best Supporting Actress | Are You There God? It's Me, Margaret. | Won | |
| 2023 | San Diego Film Critics Society | Best Supporting Actress | Are You There God? It's Me, Margaret. | Won | |
| 2023 | San Francisco Bay Area Film Critics Circle | Best Supporting Actress | Are You There God? It's Me, Margaret. | Nominated | |
| 2023 | Seattle Film Critics Society | Best Supporting Actress | Are You There God? It's Me, Margaret. | Nominated | |
| 2023 | St. Louis Film Critics Association | Best Supporting Actress | Are You There God? It's Me, Margaret. | Runner-up | |
| 2023 | North Texas Film Critics Association | Best Supporting Actress | Are You There God? It's Me, Margaret. | Nominated | |
| 2023 | UK Film Critics Association | Best Supporting Actress | Are You There God? It's Me, Margaret. | Won | |
| 2023 | Utah Film Critics Association | Best Supporting Performance, Female | Are You There God? It's Me, Margaret. | Nominated | |

== Theatre Awards ==
| Organizations | Year | Category | Work | Result | Ref. |
|---|---|---|---|---|---|
| Drama Desk Awards | 2024 | Outstanding Lead Performance in a Play | Mary Jane | Nominated | |
| Drama League Awards | 2024 | Distinguished Performance | Mary Jane | Nominated | |
| Outer Critics Circle Awards | 2024 | Outstanding Lead Performer in a Play | Mary Jane | Nominated | |
| Theatre World Awards | 2024 | Outstanding Debut Performance | Mary Jane | Won | |
