= Elizabeth Reaser =

American actress (born 1975)

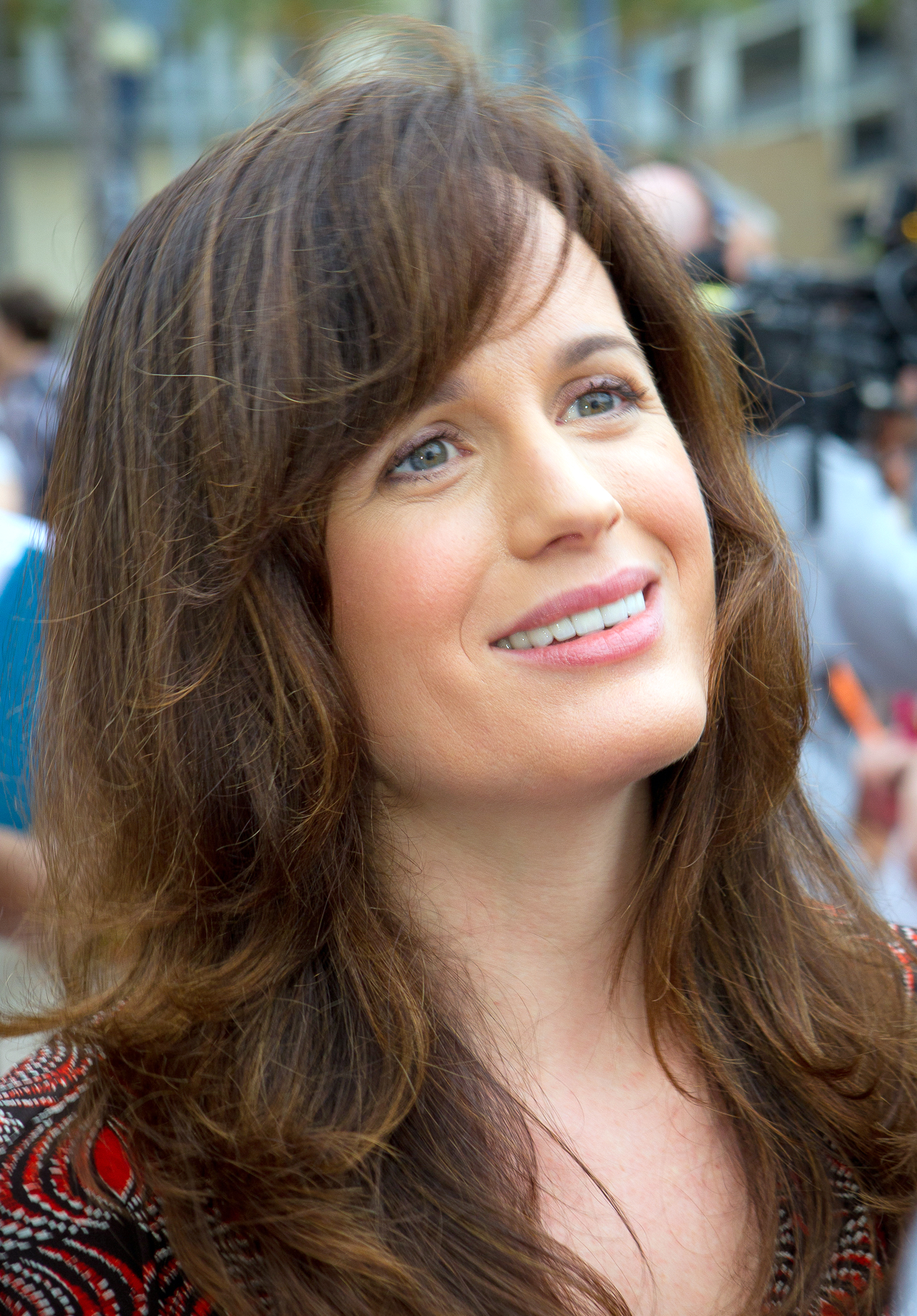
- Reaser in July 2011
- Born: Elizabeth Ann Reaser; July 2, 1975 (age 51); Bloomfield, Michigan, U.S.
- Education: Oakland University; Juilliard School (BFA)
- Occupation: Actress
- Years active: 1998–present
- Spouse: Bruce Gilbert (m. 2023)

Elizabeth Ann Reaser (born July 2, 1975) is an American film, television, and stage actress. Her work includes the films Stay, The Family Stone, Sweet Land, Against the Current, The Twilight Saga, Young Adult, and Ouija: Origin of Evil, and the TV series Saved, Grey's Anatomy, The Ex-List, The Good Wife, True Detective, Mad Men, The Handmaid's Tale, and The Haunting of Hill House.

== Early life and education ==
Reaser was born in the affluent Detroit suburb of Bloomfield Hills. Her parents are Karen Davidson (née Weidman) and John Reaser. She is the middle of three sisters. In 1995, her mother married billionaire businessman William Davidson.

Reaser attended both the Academy of the Sacred Heart in Bloomfield Hills and Avondale High School in Auburn Hills where she graduated in 1993. After high school, she attended Oakland University for one year, then attended the Juilliard School's Drama Division (1995–1999, Group 28), where she graduated with a Bachelor of Fine Arts degree in 1999.

== Career ==
Reaser prepared for her role on Saved by spending time in an emergency room, observing the behavior of medical staff. In October 2004, Interview magazine hailed her as one of the "14 To Be" emerging creative women. Her work in the film Sweet Land earned the "Jury Award" at the Newport Beach Film Festival and a nomination for the Independent Spirit Award "Best Female Lead" award. Reaser earned a Primetime Emmy Award nomination for Outstanding Guest Actress in a Drama Series for her recurring guest appearance throughout 2007 and 2008 on the television series Grey's Anatomy.

Reaser is best known for her portrayal of Esme Cullen in the film Twilight, and its follow-ups The Twilight Saga: New Moon in 2009, The Twilight Saga: Eclipse in 2010, and parts one (2011) and two (2012) of The Twilight Saga: Breaking Dawn.

Reaser appeared on the CBS' legal drama, The Good Wife in October 2010.

Reaser appeared in Season 3 of The Handmaid's Tale on Hulu.

== Filmography ==
=== Film ===
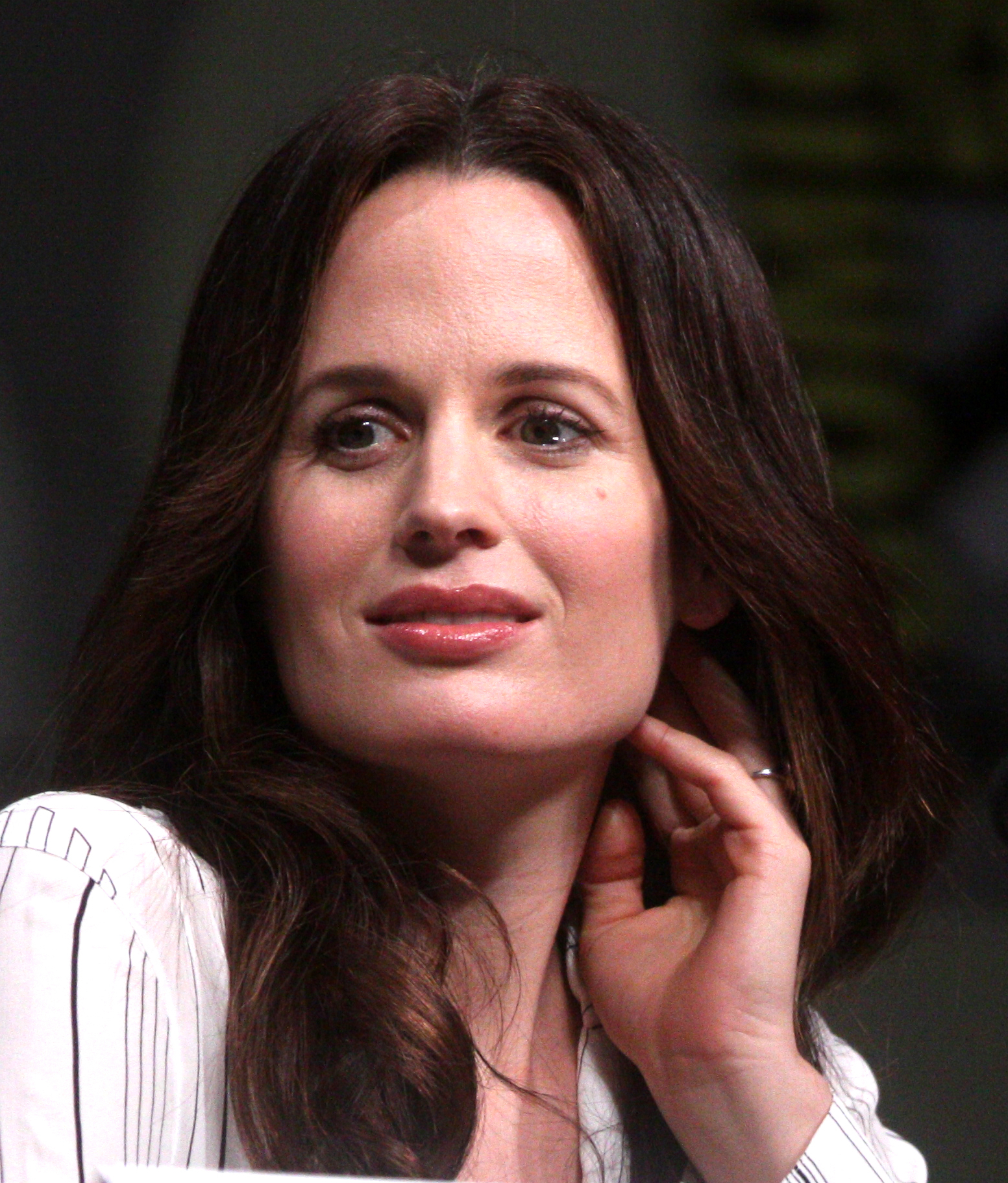
Reaser at the 2012 San Diego Comic-Con

Year	Title	Role	Notes
2001	The Believer	Miriam	
2001	Thirteen Conversations About One Thing	Young Woman In Class	
2002	Emmett's Mark	Alison Holmes	
2004	Mind the Gap	Malissa Zubach	
2005	Stay	Athena	
2005	Sweet Land	Young Inge	
2005	The Family Stone	Susannah Stone Trousdale	
2006	The Wedding Weekend	Julep	
2006	Puccini for Beginners	Allegra	
2007	Purple Violets	Bernadette	
2008	Twilight	Esme Cullen	
2009	Against the Current	Liz Clark	
2009	The Twilight Saga: New Moon	Esme Cullen	
2010	The Twilight Saga: Eclipse	Esme Cullen	
2011	The Art of Getting By	Charlotte Howe	
2011	The Twilight Saga: Breaking Dawn – Part 1	Esme Cullen	
2011	Young Adult	Beth Slade	
2012	Liberal Arts	Ana	
2012	The Twilight Saga: Breaking Dawn – Part 2	Esme Cullen	
2015	One & Two	Elizabeth	
2015	Hello, My Name Is Doris	Dr. Edwards	
2016	Ouija: Origin of Evil	Alice Zander	
2018	Nightmare Cinema	Helen	"This Way to Egress" segment
2020	Embattled	Susan Boykins	
2023	Dark Harvest	Donna Shepard	
2024	The Uninvited	Rose	
2026	Act One	Julie	
2027	The Families Stone	Susannah Stone Trousdale	Filming

=== Television ===
Year	Title	Role	Notes
1998	Sports Theater with Shaquille O'Neal	Molly	Episode: "Scrubs"
2000	The Sopranos	Stace	Episode: "D-Girl"
2002	Law & Order: Criminal Intent	Serena Whitfield	Episode: "The Insider"
2004	Hack	Elaine Jones	Episode: "Extreme Commerce"
2004	The Jury	Rachel Byrnes	Episode: "Pilot"
2006	Law & Order: Criminal Intent	Jillian Slaughter	Episode: "Proud Flesh"
2006	Saved	Alice Alden, M.D.	13 episodes
2006	Standoff	Anya Reed	Episode: "Heroine"
2007–2008	Grey's Anatomy	Ava / Rebecca Pope	18 episodes
2008	Wainy Days	Annie	Episode: "The Waindow"
2008	The Ex List	Bella Bloom	13 episodes
2010–2012	The Good Wife	Tammy Linnata	7 episodes
2013	Bonnie and Clyde: Dead and Alive	P.J. Lane	2 episodes
2014	True Detective	Laurie Perkins	Episode: "The Secret Fate of All Life"
2015	Mad Men	Diana Baur	2 episodes
2016–2019	Easy	Andi	5 episodes
2017	Manhunt: Unabomber	Ellie Fitzgerald	8 episodes
2017	Law & Order True Crime: The Menendez Murders	Pam Bozanich	7 episodes
2018	The Haunting of Hill House	Adult Shirley Crain	8 episodes
2019	The Handmaid's Tale	Mrs. Winslow	3 episodes
2020	50 States of Fright	Sara	2 episodes
2021	Impeachment: American Crime Story	Kathleen Willey	2 episodes

=== Theater ===
Year	Title	Role	Notes
1999	Sweet Bird of Youth	Heavenly	La Jolla Playhouse
2000	The Hologram Theory	Mimi	Blue Lights Theatre Company
2001	Blackbird	Froggy	Bush Theatre
2001	Closer	Alice	Portland Center Stage
2002	Stone Cold Dead Serious	Shaylee Ledbetter / Sharice	American Repertory Theater
2003	The Winter's Tale	Perdita	Classic Stage Company
2005	Top Girls	Patient Griselda / Nell / Jeanine	Williamstown Theatre Festival
2012	How I Learned to Drive	Li'l Bit	Second Stage Theatre
2014	Conviction	Jayne	Bay Street Theater
2014	The Money Shot	Karen	Lucille Lortel Theater
2015	Permission	Cyndy	Lucille Lortel Theater
2016	The Babylon Line	Joan Dellamond	Mitzi E. Newhouse Theater
2025	A Doll's House, Part 2	Nora	Pasadena Playhouse

== Awards and nominations ==
List of awards and nominations
Year	Award	Category	Title of work	Result
2006	Newport Beach Film Festival	Jury Award – Best Actress (Feature Film)	Sweet Land	Won
2007	Independent Spirit Award	Best Female Lead	Sweet Land	Nominated
2007	Primetime Emmy Award	Outstanding Guest Actress in a Drama Series	Grey's Anatomy	Nominated
2008	Screen Actors Guild Award	Outstanding Performance by an Ensemble in a Drama Series	Grey's Anatomy	Nominated
2009	Prism Award	Best Performance in a Drama Multi-Episode Storyline	Grey's Anatomy	Nominated
