= Will Weaver =

American writer (born 1950)

- Born: William Weller; 1950 (age 75–76); Park Rapids, Minnesota, U.S.
- Occupations: Novelist, professor
- Writing career
- Genres: Young Adult, Fantasy, Baseball

Will Weaver (born William Weller; 1950 in Park Rapids, Minnesota) is an American writer.

== Background ==
Weaver was raised on a dairy farm near Park Rapids, Minnesota, where his parents, who were of Scandinavian descent, farmed 150 acres. In Weaver's youth, he enjoyed fishing and participating in sports (he was the captain of his high school basketball team). At 16 years of age, he once finished second in a demolition derby. One of three children, he attended the local country school. Weaver attended Saint Cloud State University, 1968–69; University of Minnesota, B.A., 1972; Stanford University, M.A., 1979.

== Career ==
His debut was Red Earth, White Earth, about a native Minnesotan returning to his home town due to conflicts between white farmers and local Native Americans. It was made into a CBS-TV movie in 1989. His 1989 short story collection, A Gravestone Made of Wheat and Other Stories, won many awards, including the Minnesota Book Award for Fiction. The title story was produced in 2006 as the independent feature film Sweet Land, featuring Ned Beatty.

Weaver has also written many stories for young adults, including the Billy Baggs baseball novels. These include Striking Out, Farm Team, and Hard Ball. He has also written Memory Boy, Claws, Full Service, and Defect. Saturday Night Dirt, the first of a series on dirt-racers, was released in 2008 followed by Super Stock Rookie. He is the winner of both the McKnight Foundation and the Bush Foundation prizes for fiction.

In addition to writing, Weaver taught creative writing at Bemidji State University in Bemidji, Minnesota; he has since retired. He resides in the Bemidji area with his wife Rose, who is formerly a professor at Bemidji State, and his teenage children. In April 2014, he recorded an interview with Peter Shea in which he talked about his life and work.

== Bibliography ==
=== Novels and novellas ===
- Power & Light (2023)
- The Survivors (2013)
- Checkered Flag Cheater (2010)
- Super Stock Rookie (2009)
- Saturday Night Dirt (2008)
- Defect (2007)
- Full Service (2005)
- Claws (2003)
- Memory Boy (2001)
- Hard Ball (1998)
- Farm Team (1995)
- Striking Out (1993)
- Red Earth, White Earth (1986)

=== Short story collections ===
- Sweet Land (2006)
- A Gravestone Made of Wheat and Other Stories (1989)
- WWJD

=== Nonfiction ===
- Barns of Minnesota (with Doug Ohman) (2005)
