= Michael London =

American film producer

Michael London is an American film producer and a partner, with Janice Williams, in Groundswell Productions. He has produced over 20 films including Sideways, The Visitor, Win Win, and Smart People. Earlier on, before Groundswell was formed, his production company Michael London Productions treated to a Paramount first-look deal before 2006. Even before that, he was a producer at USA Films/Focus Features. The film Sideways was nominated for an Academy Award for Best Picture in 2005. On the heels of the Academy nomination, London won "Producer of the Year" in 2006 at the Palm Springs International Film Festival. London will be the executive producer of the upcoming HBO adaptation of the novel A Visit From the Goon Squad. In 2013, Groundswell was scheduled to produce Mona for the studio New Regency, based on the novel of the same name by Swedish author Dan T. Sehlberg. He had a first look TV deal with Fox 21 in 2013.

== Filmography ==
=== Film ===
- 40 Days and 40 Nights (2002)
- The Guru (2002)
- Second String (2002)
- Thirteen (2003)
- House of Sand and Fog (2003)
- Sideways (2004)
- The Family Stone (2005)
- The Illusionist (2006)
- King of California (2007)
- The Visitor (2007)
- The Mysteries of Pittsburgh (2008)
- Smart People (2008)
- Appaloosa (2008)
- Milk (2008)
- The Informant! (2009)
- The Marc Pease Experience (2009)
- All Good Things (2010)
- Win Win (2011)
- Lola Versus (2012)
- Very Good Girls (2013)
- The Final Girls (2015)
- Trumbo (2015)
- The Hollars (2015)
- Love the Coopers (2015)
- Birth of the Dragon (2016)
- Farming (2018)
- The Greatest Hits (2024)
- The Families Stone (2027)

=== Television ===
- Betas (2013–2014)
- The Astronaut Wives Club (2015)
- The Magicians (2015–2020)
- Chance (2016–2017)
- Snowfall (2017–2023)
- SMILF (2017–2019)
- Alice & Jack (2024)
