= Rachel McAdams =

Canadian actress (born 1978)

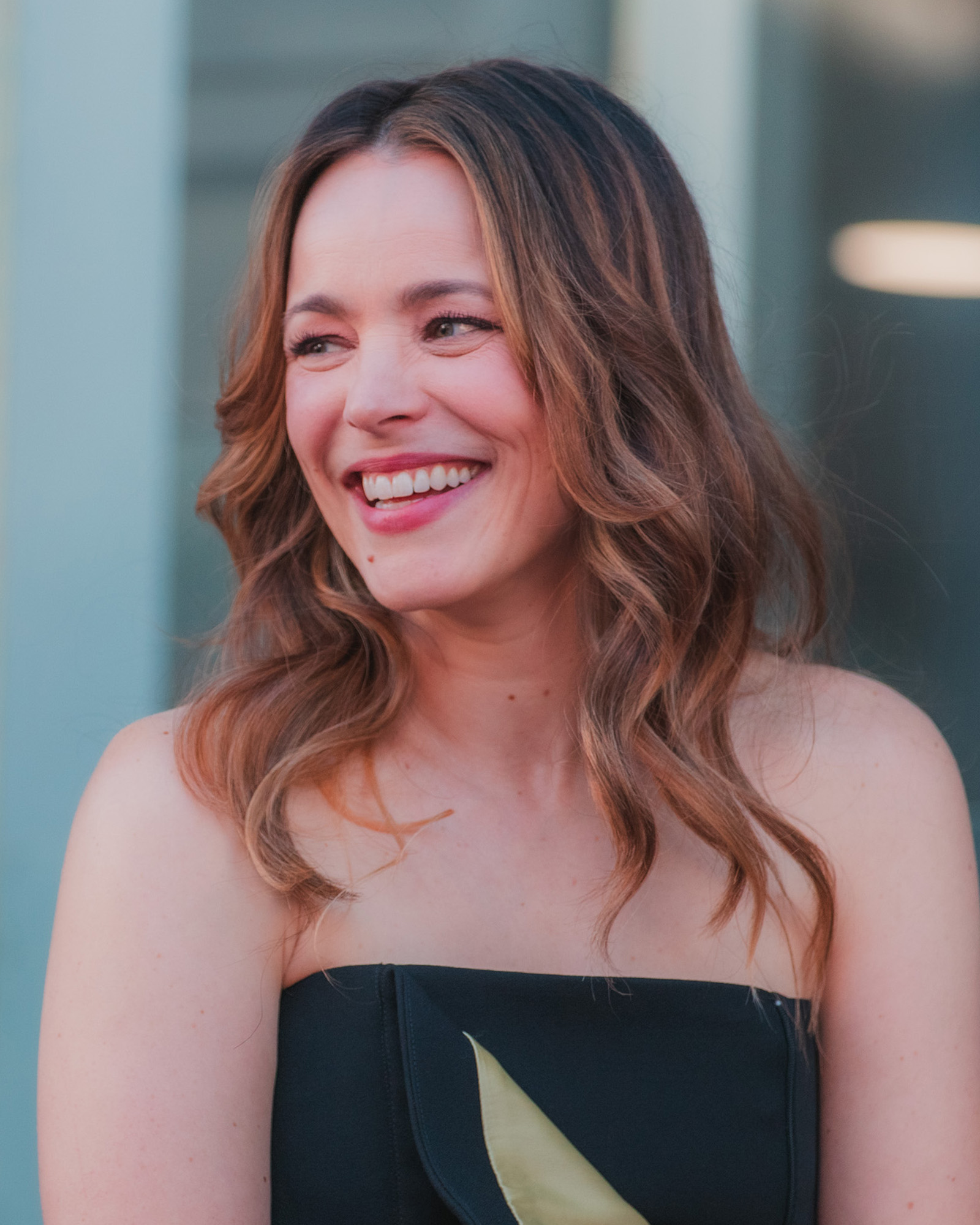
- McAdams in 2026
- Born: Rachel Anne McAdams; November 17, 1978 (age 48); London, Ontario, Canada
- Education: York University (BFA)
- Occupation: Actress
- Years active: 2001–present
- Partner: Jamie Linden (2016–present)
- Children: 2
- Awards: Full list

Signature
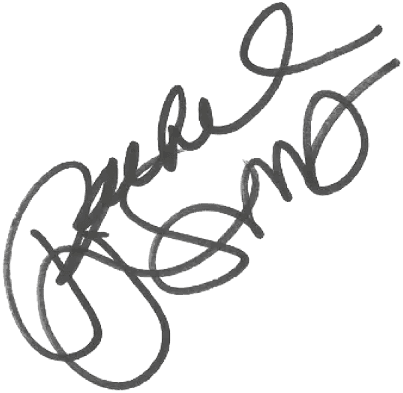

Rachel Anne McAdams (born November 17, 1978) is a Canadian actress. A graduate of York University in 2001 with a BFA degree in theatre, she is known for her starring roles in comedy and drama films as well as her work in television and theater. Her accolades include nominations for an Academy Award, a British Academy Film Award, and a Tony Award. In 2026, she was honored with a star on the Hollywood Walk of Fame. As a leading actress, her films have grossed over $3.4 billion worldwide.

McAdams made her Hollywood film debut in the comedy The Hot Chick in 2002. She rose to fame in 2004 with her portrayal of Regina George in the comedy Mean Girls and Allie Hamilton in the romantic drama The Notebook. In 2005, she starred in the romantic comedy Wedding Crashers, the psychological thriller Red Eye, and the comedy-drama The Family Stone. She was hailed by the media as Hollywood's new "it girl", and received a nomination for the BAFTA Rising Star Award.

After a hiatus, McAdams gained further prominence starring in the films The Time Traveler's Wife (2009), Sherlock Holmes (2009), Morning Glory (2010), Midnight in Paris (2011), The Vow (2012), and About Time (2013). For her portrayal of journalist Sacha Pfeiffer in the drama Spotlight (2015), she was nominated for the Academy Award for Best Supporting Actress. This was followed by roles in the Marvel Cinematic Universe films Doctor Strange (2016) and Doctor Strange in the Multiverse of Madness (2022), the romantic drama Disobedience (2017), the comedies Game Night (2018) and Eurovision Song Contest: The Story of Fire Saga (2020), the comedy-drama Are You There God? It's Me, Margaret. (2023), and the horror-thriller Send Help (2026).

On television, she starred in the second season of the HBO anthology crime drama series True Detective (2015), earning a Critics' Choice Television Award for Best Actress in a Miniseries or Movie nomination. She made her Broadway debut playing a struggling single mother in Amy Herzog's play Mary Jane (2024) for which she was nominated for a Tony Award for Best Actress in a Play.

== Early life and education ==
Rachel Anne McAdams was born on November 17, 1978, in London, Ontario, to nurse Sandra (née Gale) and truck driver Lance McAdams. She grew up in St. Thomas in a Protestant household. The eldest of three children, she has a younger sister who is a make-up artist and a younger brother who is a personal trainer. McAdams is of Scottish, English, Irish and Welsh descent. Her maternal fifth great-grandfather, James Gray, fought as a Loyalist Ranger during the American Revolution and fled to Upper Canada after the Battles of Saratoga.

McAdams began figure skating when she was four, but turned down an opportunity to move to Toronto when she was nine for pair skating training. She skated competitively until she was 18, winning regional awards. She has said that skating prepared her for acting by teaching her to be "in tune" with her body.

McAdams attended Myrtle Street Public School and Central Elgin Collegiate Institute. She said that she did not enjoy academic work and often pretended to be sick to avoid going to school. Nonetheless, she was active in student life. In addition to playing sports (including volleyball, badminton, and soccer), she was on the student council, participated in the Crime Stoppers program, and was a member of the Peer Helping Team. She worked at a McDonald's restaurant during summer holidays for three years.

She developed an interest in performing when she was seven, and while her parents did not discourage her, they did not "go out and find me an agent." She attended Disney and William Shakespeare summer camps as a child. From age 12, she participated in Original Kids Theatre Company, London productions, and in her late teens directed children's theatre productions. She was also involved in school stage productions, and won a performance award at the Sears Ontario Drama Festival. She was inspired by two of her teachers, who taught her English and drama, respectively, in grades 11 and 12. She intended to take cultural studies at the University of Western Ontario before being persuaded by her drama teacher that a professional acting career was a viable option.

She enrolled in York University's four-year theatre program and graduated with a Bachelor of Fine Arts honours degree in 2001. While there, she worked with the Toronto-based Necessary Angel Theatre Company.

== Career ==
=== 2001–2003: Early work ===
In 2001, McAdams made her television debut in the MTV pilot Shotgun Love Dolls as Beth Swanson, which was filmed during March break at York University. She also made her Canadian film debut that year in the comedy My Name Is Tanino. The Italian-Canadian co-production was filmed in Sicily when McAdams was 22 years old, and it marked her first time on an airplane. McAdams later earned a Genie Award nomination in Canada for her role in the drama Perfect Pie.

In 2002, she made her Hollywood film debut with Rob Schneider and Anna Faris in the comedy The Hot Chick, which McAdams has described as a "huge milestone" in her career. She played a catty high school student who swaps bodies with Schneider's character, a small-time criminal. Kevin Thomas of the Los Angeles Times felt she "emerges as a young actress of much promise". Afterwards, McAdams returned to Canada to star as Kate McNab in Slings and Arrows, a comedy mini-series about backstage theatre life at the fictional New Burbage Shakespearean Festival. She was written out of the second season of the program following her success in the United States. She received two Gemini Award nominations for her work on the program, winning one.

=== 2004–2005: Breakthrough ===
McAdams's break-out role came in 2004, when she starred in the comedy film Mean Girls opposite Lindsay Lohan, Lacey Chabert, and Amanda Seyfried, based on Rosalind Wiseman's book Queen Bees and Wannabes. McAdams was 24 years old when she was cast as the mean high school queen bee Regina George, and she modelled her character on Alec Baldwin's performance in the drama Glengarry Glen Ross (1992). Mike Clark of USA Today praised her "comic flair" while Jenny McCartney of The Daily Telegraph found her "delightfully hateful." Mick LaSalle of the San Francisco Chronicle felt that "McAdams brings glamour and magnetism to Regina, but also the right hint of comic distance." The film grossed $129 million worldwide and earned McAdams two MTV Movie Awards. Mean Girls later reached No. 12 in an Entertainment Weekly list of the Greatest Ever High School Movies. Tina Fey, who co‑starred in the film and wrote the screenplay, has credited McAdams with teaching her how to act in front of a camera rather than an audience: "She's a film actor. She's not pushing. And so I kind of learned that lesson from watching her."

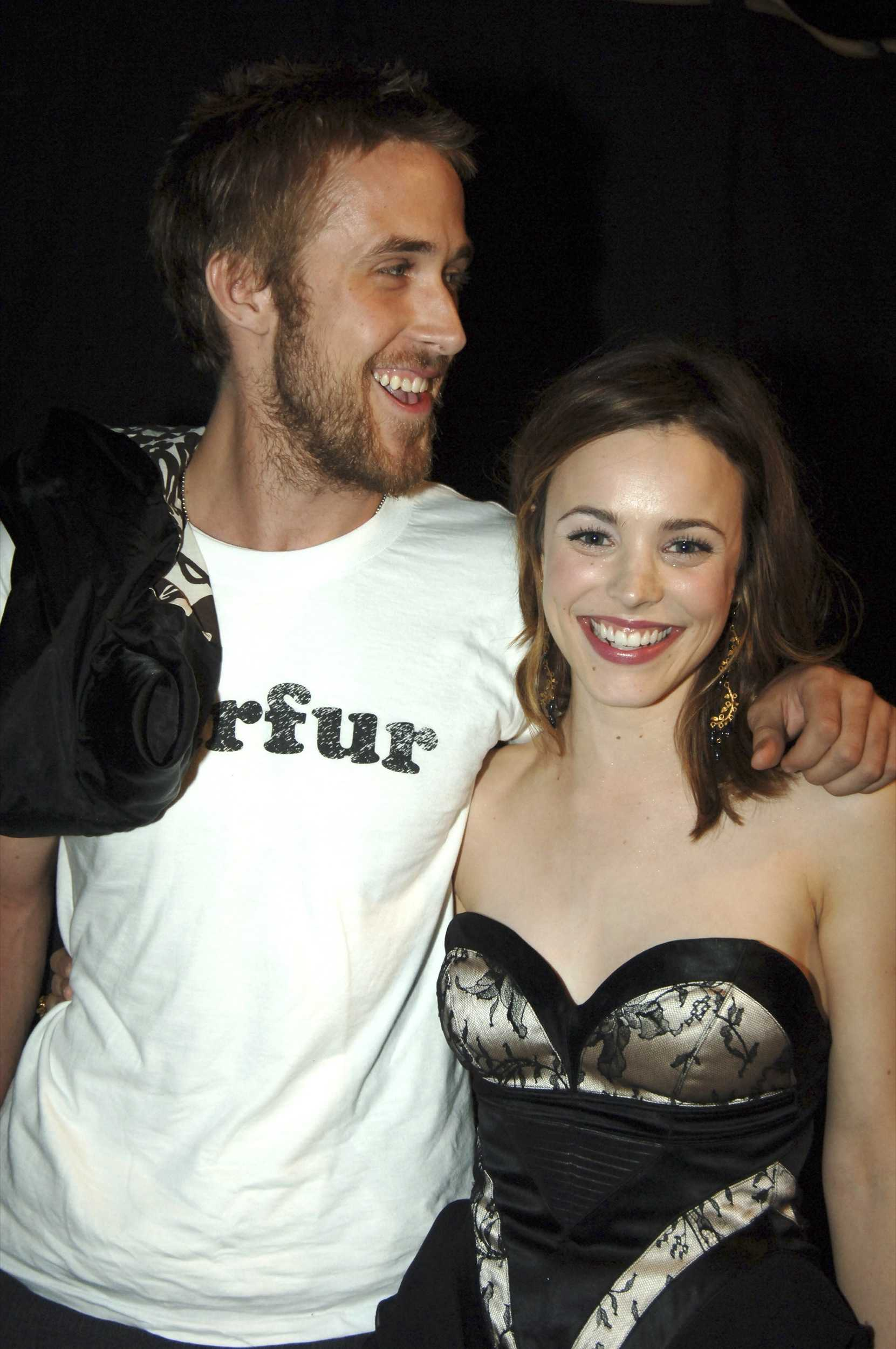
McAdams with The Notebook co-star Ryan Gosling at the 2005 MTV Movie Awards

Later in 2004, McAdams starred opposite fellow Canadian Ryan Gosling in the romantic drama The Notebook, based on Nicholas Sparks' novel of the same name. She played Allie Hamilton, a wealthy Southern belle who has a forbidden love affair with Gosling's poor labourer, Noah Calhoun. McAdams spent time in Charleston, South Carolina, prior to filming to familiarize herself with the Southern accent, and took ballet and etiquette classes. Filming took place from late 2002 to early 2003. Although McAdams and Gosling became romantically involved in 2005, they had a combative relationship on set. "We inspired the worst in each other," Gosling has said. "It was a strange experience, making a love story and not getting along with your co-star in any way." At one point, Gosling asked the film's director Nick Cassavetes to "bring somebody else in for my off-camera shot" because he felt McAdams was being uncooperative. Stephen Holden of The New York Times praised the "spontaneous and combustible" performances of the two leads while Roger Ebert was won over by the "beauty and clarity" of McAdams's performance. Michael Wilmington of the Chicago Tribune declared her "a real discovery" who "infuses young Allie with that radiant, breathlessly winning ingénue grace and charm that breaks hearts". The film grossed over $115 million worldwide. McAdams won an MTV Movie Award and four Teen Choice Awards. Entertainment Weekly has said that the movie contains the All-Time Best Movie Kiss while the Los Angeles Times has included a scene from the film in a list of the 50 Classic Movie Kisses. The Notebook has appeared on many Most Romantic Movies lists. "I'm so grateful to have a film that people respond to in that way", McAdams told Elle in 2011. "It was a big deal."

In 2005, McAdams starred with Owen Wilson, Vince Vaughn, and Bradley Cooper in the romantic comedy Wedding Crashers. McAdams played a daughter of an influential politician, who is caught in a love triangle with Wilson and Cooper's characters. McAdams listened repeatedly to Fleetwood Mac's 1975 song "Landslide" to prepare for emotional scenes, and Wilson has said the song made her cry immediately: "It was like turning on a faucet." She trained for a sailing certification for a boating sequence because her character was said to be an accomplished sailor. Manohla Dargis of The New York Times felt McAdams "makes the most of her underdeveloped character" and "grows more appealing with every new role". Brian Lowry of Variety found her "a beguiling presence" who "actually creates a real character – a rarity for females in one of these lad-mag escapades". From a production budget of $40 million, the film grossed over $285 million worldwide.

Afterwards, McAdams starred opposite Cillian Murphy in Wes Craven's psychological thriller Red Eye, where she played a young hotel manager who is held captive by Murphy's character while aboard a red-eye flight. Craven has said McAdams was the only actress he considered for the part. She was drawn to the relatable qualities of her character: "She was not some sweaty, tank-top-wearing, Uzi-carrying super woman". Robert Koehler of Variety found her "increasingly impressive" while Roger Ebert of the Chicago Sun-Times asserted that "she brings more presence and credibility to her role than is really expected; she acts without betraying the slightest awareness that she's inside a genre. Her performance qualifies her for heavy-duty roles." Upon release, the film, which was made on a budget of $26 million, earned over $95 million at the worldwide box office. In late 2005, McAdams starred with Sarah Jessica Parker and Diane Keaton in the seasonal family comedy-drama The Family Stone, which gave McAdams an opportunity to play a dishevelled and sardonic sister, rather than the usual "obvious" girlfriend or wife roles. She was eager to work with Keaton and remarked, "It's never about line counts for me. It's about the people I get to work with." Justin Chang of Variety noted that "a deglammed but still radiant McAdams proves once again that she's the real deal, delivering a deliciously feisty performance". Manohla Dargis of The New York Times felt that her "engaging screen presence holds your attention and sympathy despite the handicap presented by her character's personality." The film was a commercial success: it cost $18 million to make and grossed over $92 million worldwide.

=== 2006–2010: Career hiatus and return ===
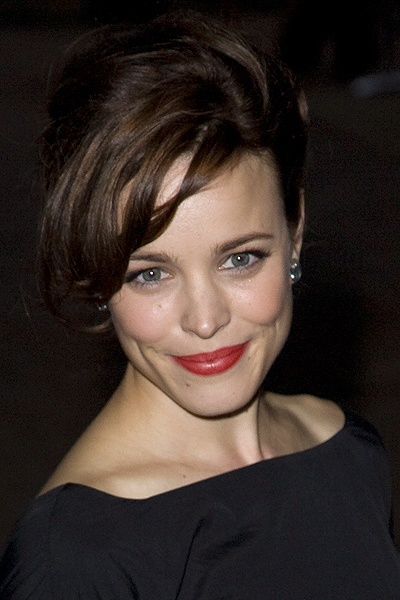
McAdams at the 2007 Toronto International Film Festival

At this point in her career, McAdams was hailed as "the next Julia Roberts" and the new "Hollywood it girl". Vanity Fair invited McAdams, along with actresses Scarlett Johansson and Keira Knightley, to appear on its March 2006 cover, the annual Hollywood issue. Upon arrival on the photo set, McAdams discovered it was a nude session, declined and left. She later parted ways with her publicist at the time, who had not informed her in advance. Knightley later recounted, "Quite early on Rachel just said, 'No, I'm not into that.' She's a lovely girl, and I really respect her for doing that." When asked about the incident in 2008, McAdams had "no regrets". McAdams took a break from her film career from 2006 to 2007. "There were a lot of cooks in the kitchen, a lot of voices around me, and I wanted to step away so I could hear my own voice again", McAdams said in 2013. "Truthfully, I never really wanted to be a big movie star. I never even wanted to work outside of Canada, or outside of the theatre." During that period, McAdams turned down roles in the films The Devil Wears Prada (2006), Casino Royale (2006), Mission: Impossible III (2006), Iron Man (2008), and Get Smart (2008). In February 2006, she made a one-off stage appearance in The Vagina Monologues at St. Lawrence Centre for the Arts in Toronto to raise funds for V-Day. That same year, McAdams received a Rising Star Award nomination from the British Academy of Film and Television Arts and hosted the Academy Awards for Technical Achievement.

McAdams returned to her film career in 2008. She starred with Pierce Brosnan and Chris Cooper in the 1940s film noir Married Life where she played Kay Nesbitt, a young widow who wins the affections of Brosnan and Cooper's older characters. In preparation for the role, McAdams studied old films, particularly those of Kim Novak. She has said the film shoot re-energized and re-inspired her and made her eager to continue working more often again. Lisa Schwarzbaum of Entertainment Weekly found McAdams "a particularly delightful vision after her two-year intermission". Todd McCarthy of Variety criticized her break from the big screen but felt that, despite a performance of "tender feeling", "her natural vivaciousness and spontaneity are straitjacketed" by the film noir format. The film had a limited release and was a box-office failure. It grossed just over $2 million worldwide, failing to recoup its production budget of $12 million.

Afterwards, McAdams starred with Tim Robbins and Michael Peña in the road trip comedy-drama The Lucky Ones, a story about three Iraq War soldiers on a brief road trip back in the United States. She trained at a real boot camp, at Fort Campbell, Kentucky, prior to filming. In 2011, McAdams said that Colee Dunn was "probably one of my favorite characters I've ever played". The film also had a limited release and Laura Kern of The New York Times found her "luminous as always" while Roger Ebert of the Chicago Sun-Times hailed the performance as "her coming of age as an actress". "Previously she has been seen mostly as a hot chick or an idealized sweetheart", he wrote. "Here she is feisty, vulnerable, plucky, warm, funny ... Watch the poignancy of the scene when she meets her boyfriend's family." Owen Gleiberman of Entertainment Weekly found her "feisty, gorgeous, and as mercurial as a mood ring". The Lucky Ones is the least commercially successful film of McAdams's career as of 2012, having grossed just $266,967 worldwide.

In 2009, McAdams starred with Russell Crowe, Helen Mirren and Ben Affleck in the political thriller State of Play, based on the BBC drama television series of the same name. McAdams played Della Frye, an online reporter who investigates a possible conspiracy with Crowe's character, a veteran print journalist. McAdams visited The Washington Post's offices and met with politicians on Capitol Hill for her research. Gleiberman of Entertainment Weekly felt she was "perfectly cast as an ambitious wonkette" while Sukhdev Sandhu of The Daily Telegraph noted that "McAdams, with her lively eyes and large, expressive forehead, holds her own against Crowe. Mercifully, she avoids any temptation to play girly and demure to his grizzled alpha male." The film grossed over $87 million worldwide. Also in 2009, McAdams starred opposite Eric Bana in the science fiction romantic drama The Time Traveler's Wife, based on Audrey Niffenegger's best-selling novel of the same name. McAdams fell "madly in love" with the novel, but was initially slightly hesitant to accept the role because she felt Clare Abshire, the long-suffering wife, was a "character that people have already cast in their heads". Peter Travers of Rolling Stone said, "I'd watch the vibrant Rachel McAdams and Eric Bana in anything, but The Time Traveler's Wife is pushing it." Betsy Sharkey of the Los Angeles Times found her "luminous [yet], sadly, her facility as an actress is mostly wasted." Writing in The Chicago Tribune, Michael Phillips, in an otherwise tepid review, said of her performance: "Every scene she's in, even the silly ones, becomes better—truer, often against long odds—because she's in it. Her work feels emotionally spontaneous yet technically precise. She has an unusually easy touch with both comedy and drama, and she never holds a melodramatic moment hostage." The film was a commercial success, earning over $101 million worldwide.

In late 2009, McAdams starred in the mystery/action-adventure film Sherlock Holmes with Robert Downey, Jr. and Jude Law. She played Irene Adler, an antagonist and love interest of Downey's title character Sherlock Holmes, and welcomed the opportunity to play a character who is "her own boss and a real free spirit". Todd McCarthy of Variety felt her character was "not very well integrated into the rest of the story, a shortcoming the normally resourceful McAdams is unable to do much about". A. O. Scott of The New York Times stated, "Ms. McAdams is a perfectly charming actress and performs gamely as the third wheel of this action-bromance tricycle. But Irene feels in this movie more like a somewhat cynical commercial contrivance. She offers a little something for the ladies and also something for the lads, who, much as they may dig fights and explosions and guns and chases, also like girls." The film was a major commercial success, earning over $524 million at the worldwide box office.

In 2010, McAdams starred with her The Family Stone co-star Diane Keaton and Harrison Ford in the comedy Morning Glory. She played a television producer attempting to improve the poor ratings of a morning television program. The film was billed as a starring vehicle for McAdams. She initially felt she was unsuited to the role saying, "I'm not funny. So I said, 'if you need me to be funny, you might want to look somewhere else'". The film's director Roger Michell had a number of dinners with McAdams and persuaded her to join the cast. Since working with Keaton, McAdams has described her as a mentor figure. Kenneth Turan of the Los Angeles Times said McAdams "gives the kind of performance we go to the movies for" while Roger Ebert of the Chicago Sun-Times felt she played "as lovable a lead as anyone since Amy Adams in Junebug" in an otherwise "routine" movie. Variety's Andrew Barker was impressed by her gift for physical comedy. While Manohla Dargis of The New York Times felt she "plays her role exceptionally well" and is "effortlessly likable", it called on Hollywood to give her parts "worthy" of her talent. "Ms. McAdams has to rely on her dimples to get by. She does, but she could do better." The film was a modest commercial success, grossing $58 million worldwide from a production budget of $40 million. McAdams later expressed her disappointment that the film failed to find a larger audience.

=== 2011–2014: Work with auteurs ===
In 2011, McAdams starred in Woody Allen's fantasy romantic comedy Midnight in Paris with her Wedding Crashers co-star Owen Wilson and Michael Sheen. The film opened the 2011 Cannes Film Festival. McAdams played Inez, the shrewish fiancée of Wilson's character Gil. Allen wrote McAdams' part for her, after hearing "glowing reports" from his friend and her former co-star Diane Keaton. He said that he was "crazy about Rachel" and wanted to give her the opportunity to play something other than "beautiful girls". The film was shot on location in Paris and McAdams has said that the experience "will always have a great place in my heart". The Guardian criticized that she "has morphed from the sweet thing in Wedding Crashers to the dream-crushing bitch that, according to American comedies, women become once they ensnare their man". Richard Corliss of Time "felt sorry for McAdams, whose usually winning presence is ground into hostile cliché". However, Kenneth Turan of the Los Angeles Times felt she "deftly handles a part that is less amiable than usual for her" and A. O. Scott of The New York Times found her "superbly speeded-up". It became Allen's highest-grossing film ever in North America and was the most commercially successful independent film of 2011. With a production budget of $17 million, the film has grossed over $151 million worldwide. McAdams, along with six other members of the cast, received a Screen Actors Guild Award for Outstanding Performance by a Cast in a Motion Picture nomination. Allen won the Academy Award for Best Original Screenplay and the film itself was nominated for three other Academy Awards, including Best Picture.

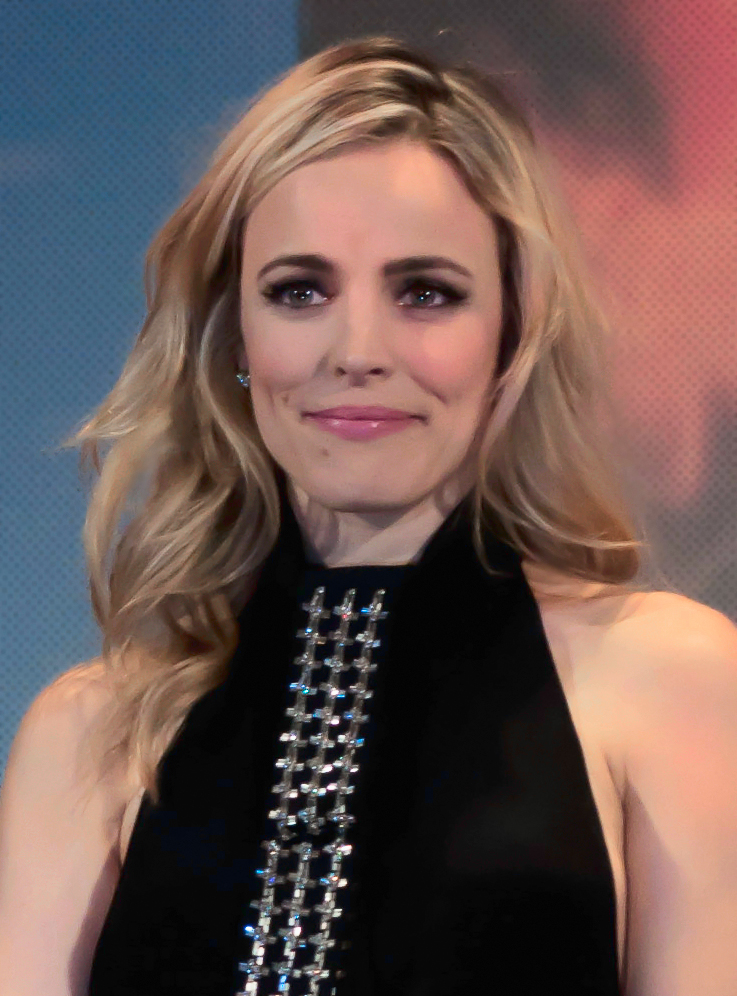
McAdams at the 2012 Toronto International Film Festival

McAdams reprised her role as Irene Adler in the mystery/action-adventure sequel Sherlock Holmes: A Game of Shadows, but the female lead role was played by Noomi Rapace. Joel Silver, the film's producer, has said that "we always intended to have a different kind of girl for each movie" in the vein of Bond girls. He found it "complicated" to persuade McAdams to return in a smaller role: "She loved being with us, but she hoped to have a bigger role." Joe Morgenstern of The Wall Street Journal felt "she vanishes all too soon in this overproduced, self-enchanted sequel, and so does the spirit of bright invention that made the previous film such a pleasant surprise." Scott Mendelson of The Huffington Post remarked that she "exhibits far more personality and roguish charm in her few moments here than she did in all of the previous film. Freed from the constraints of being the de-facto love interest, McAdams relishes the chance to go full-villain." The film has grossed over $543 million worldwide.

In 2012, McAdams starred opposite Channing Tatum in the romantic drama The Vow, based on a true story. McAdams and Tatum played a newlywed couple who try to rebuild their relationship after a car crash leaves the wife with no recollections of who he is or their marriage. McAdams was drawn to the "roller coaster" faced by her character and found it interesting that the story was told "through the guy's eyes". A. O. Scott of The New York Times stated that "the dimply and adorable Rachel McAdams" brings "enough physical charm and emotional warmth to distract from the threadbare setting and the paper-thin plot". Joseph Amodio of Newsday felt that McAdams, "exuding her usual uncanny warmth on-screen", "is the real draw". However, Betsy Sharkey of the Los Angeles Times felt she was "wasted" in the role: "She is such an appealing actress that it's hard not to wish someone could make better use" of her. Mary Pols of Time found the film an example of McAdams "coasting" in "unabashedly romantic" movies and asserted that "she's a much more versatile and clever actress" than such projects would suggest. The film, financed for $30 million, was a major commercial success and became her biggest box-office hit in a leading role. It topped the U.S. box office and has grossed over $196 million worldwide.

In 2013, McAdams co-starred opposite Ben Affleck in Terrence Malick's romantic drama To the Wonder. McAdams played a horse ranch worker in Oklahoma and the love interest of Affleck's character. She found Malick to be an "incredibly helpful" director; they discussed her character in detail and he took her on a tour of the local town, pointing out which house she would have grown up in and where she would have attended school. Upon its limited theatrical American release, the film polarized film critics. Oliver Lyttelton of IndieWire noted that "McAdams has the least to do of the principals, but is wonderfully haunted and sad in her brief appearances". Afterwards, McAdams starred in Brian De Palma's erotic thriller Passion opposite Noomi Rapace. They played two business executives engaged in a power struggle. De Palma saw McAdams' performance in Mean Girls and decided to cast her as Christine. The movie was released in selected theatres in the US. Gleiberman of Entertainment Weekly noted that McAdams "uses her sexy billboard smile and emphatic delivery to nail a certain type of troublemaker boss who embeds her aggression in pert 'sincerity'" while Robert Abele of the Los Angeles Times remarked: "McAdams and Rapace are gesturally awkward and wildly miscast—more sorority sisters in a spat than cross-generational power antagonists."

In 2013, McAdams starred in Richard Curtis' romantic comedy-drama About Time opposite Domhnall Gleeson. Zooey Deschanel was originally slated to play McAdams's role but dropped out shortly before filming began. A fan of Curtis for years, McAdams wanted to work with him on what he stated would be his last project as a director. The film was a commercial success at the international box office, and McAdams had a positive reception among critics, with Leslie Felperin of Variety praising her and Gleeson for their "radiant, believable chemistry" which "keeps the film aloft." The following year, McAdams starred opposite Philip Seymour Hoffman in an adaptation of John le Carré's espionage thriller A Most Wanted Man, directed by Anton Corbijn. McAdams' attempt at a German accent was criticised by some reviewers. Richard Lawson of Vanity Fair noted that McAdams had a "little less success with her accent" than her co-star Hoffman but, nonetheless, she "proves as intelligent, soulful, and magnetic a presence as ever". In late 2014, McAdams received a star on Canada's Walk of Fame.

=== 2015–2018: Critical acclaim ===
In 2015, McAdams starred with Michael Keaton, Mark Ruffalo and Stanley Tucci as journalist Sacha Pfeiffer in Tom McCarthy's Spotlight, a drama about the child-abuse scandal in Boston's Catholic Church. To prepare for her role, McAdams spent time with Pfeiffer. The film garnered critical acclaim and won the Academy Award for Best Picture. Though Justin Chang of Variety felt McAdams imbued her character with "sensitivity and grit", he was nonetheless surprised by her subsequent Academy Award nomination: "[The performance] has the sort of fine-grained subtlety that voters too rarely notice. Take another look at that scene in which she gently, skillfully encourages an abuse survivor to lay bare his most lacerating secrets—a small master class in how the simple act of listening can become a conduit for compassion." For her role, McAdams received nominations for the Academy Award for Best Supporting Actress, Critics' Choice Movie Award for Best Supporting Actress and Screen Actors Guild Award nominations in the categories of Outstanding Actress in a Supporting Role and Outstanding Cast in a Motion Picture.

She next starred with her Wedding Crashers co-star Bradley Cooper, Emma Stone and John Krasinski in Cameron Crowe's romantic comedy-drama Aloha. She played the ex-girlfriend of Cooper's character, who is married to Krasinski's character with two children. While the film received a negative reaction and controversy from critics and audiences alike, Wesley Morris of Grantland remarked: "Someone who can speak Crowe's language really helps. McAdams might be the best he's ever had ... [She] puts the perfect amount of air in her lines, giving the words a lightness that conflates optimism, amusement, and resignation. She's never seemed lovelier, more instinctive, or more present." Mark Olsen of the Los Angeles Times felt she "plays likely the strongest, most rounded female character Crowe has ever written, a woman suddenly lips to lips with the life she has and the one she might have had, and the actress brings a grounded, unforced earthiness to the role that is a joy to watch."

She co-starred with Jake Gyllenhaal in the boxing drama Southpaw (2015), where she played the wife of Gyllenhaal's character. A.O. Scott of The New York Times conceded: "It features some pretty appealing players. There are worse things to see at the multiplex than Ms. McAdams playing a tough cookie standing by her man." She co-starred with James Franco, Charlotte Gainsbourg and Marie-Josée Croze in Wim Wenders' drama Every Thing Will Be Fine. The film received a U.S. limited release in December 2015. Guy Lodge of Variety remarked: "Poor McAdams, sporting sensible hair and a truly mystifying cod-Continental accent, continues her thankless run of needy, tossed-aside love interests in big-name auteur projects." That same year, McAdams returned to television and starred as Det. Ani Bezzerides in the second season of HBO's anthology crime drama True Detective with her Wedding Crashers co-star Vince Vaughn, Colin Farrell and Taylor Kitsch. Richard Vine of The Guardian remarked: "If there's anyone with any chance of enjoying a McConaughaissance here it's probably McAdams – an actor whose characters are more usually associated with the death of the romcom than murders involving people with eyes burned out by acid. Here, her Ani is a convincing mess." She received a nomination for the Critics' Choice Television Award for Best Actress in a Movie/Miniseries for her role. Also in 2015, McAdams played Buttercup in a one-off, staged LACMA Live Read of The Princess Bride.

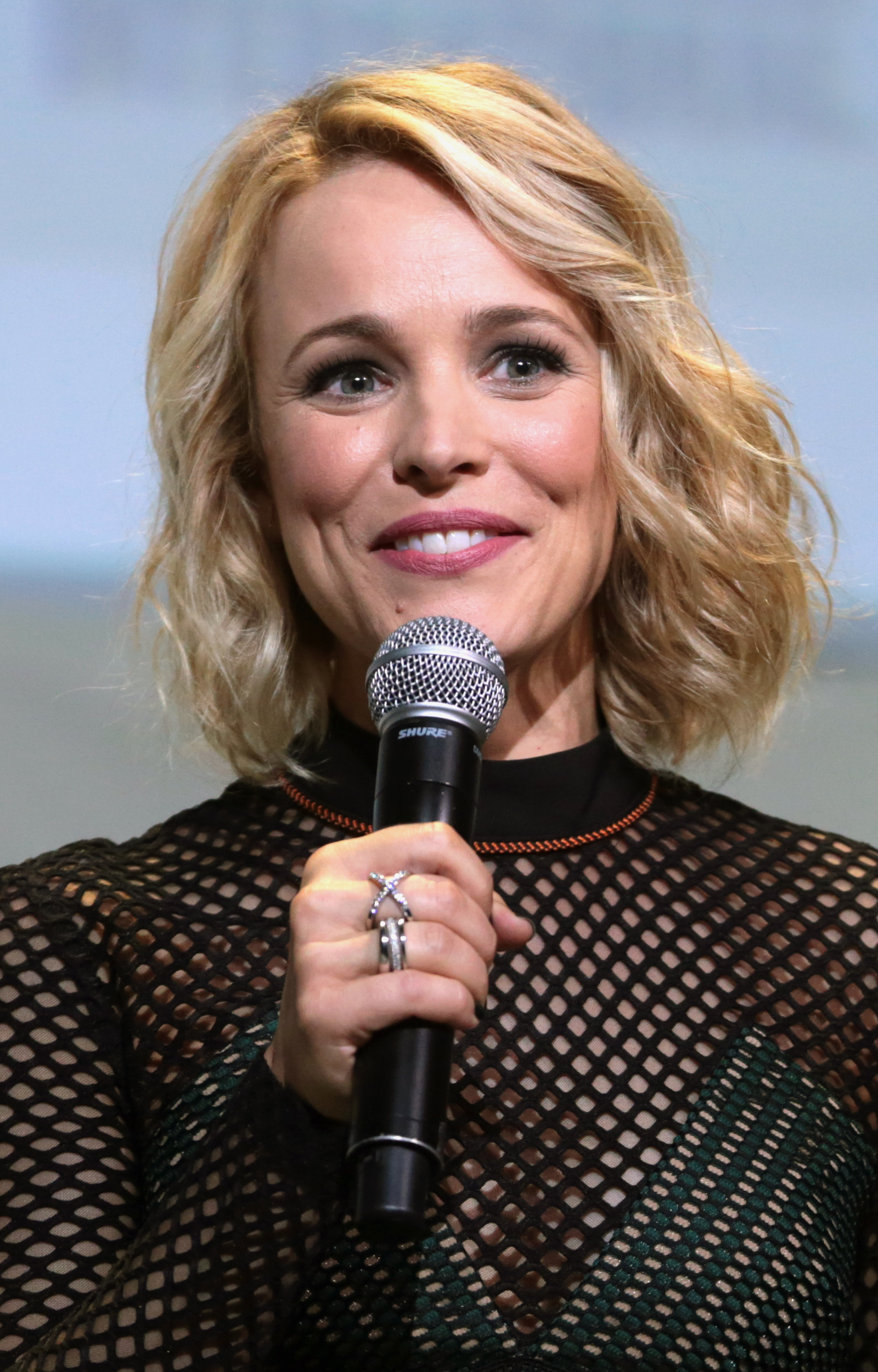
McAdams in 2016

The following year, McAdams voiced The Mother of The Little Girl in an animated version of The Little Prince, and co-starred with Benedict Cumberbatch in the Marvel Cinematic Universe superhero film Doctor Strange. Peter Debruge of Variety said McAdams played "the most competent—and human—of Marvel's window-dressing girlfriends," while Gregory Ellwood of Indiewire remarked: "It goes without saying that McAdams will never get the credit she deserves for transforming the barely sketched out role of Strange's former medical colleague Christine Palmer into a captivating three-dimensional character that feels like an integral part of the storyline even when she isn't." Also in 2016, McAdams narrated an audiobook version of L. M. Montgomery's novel Anne of Green Gables, released by Audible.

After a year-long absence from the screen, McAdams co-starred with Jason Bateman in the comedy Game Night (2018). Glenn Kenny of The New York Times said the film served as a "reminder that Ms. McAdams is one of cinema's most accomplished and appealing comic actresses." Richard Lawson of Vanity Fair felt her character lacked "any real arc or motivation of her own", but "It's a testament to McAdams's talent and charm, then, that she doesn't get lost in the movie, asserting herself in every scene with a goofy brightness." She performed some of her own stunt driving in a getaway scene. Later in 2018, McAdams starred opposite Rachel Weisz in Sebastián Lelio's romantic drama Disobedience, based on Naomi Alderman's novel. Manohla Dargis of The New York Times said McAdams "does some lovely work here to convey a woman agonizing over her existential situation".

=== 2020–present: Broadway debut and continued film success ===
In 2020, she co-starred with Will Ferrell in the Netflix musical comedy film Eurovision Song Contest: The Story of Fire Saga. McAdams reprised the role of Christine Palmer in the superhero sequel Doctor Strange in the Multiverse of Madness. Released in May 2022, it garnered mixed reviews. McAdams starred in Are You There God? It's Me, Margaret., a film adaptation of Judy Blume's novel of the same name. The film was released in April 2023 to positive reviews. Vanity Fair's Richard Lawson wrote in his review that McAdams "deftly paints a thorough and compelling picture of a woman of the era" in her portrayal of the titular Margaret's mother, Barbara.

McAdams appeared as a cameo guest on Saturday Night Live in January 2024, introducing Reneé Rapp as musical guest and appeared as a look-a-like of herself in a comedy sketch where the look-a-like asked Jacob Elordi for acting advice. McAdams made her Broadway debut in 2024, starring in Amy Herzog's play Mary Jane at the Samuel J. Friedman Theatre. Performances started April 2 with opening night set for April 23, 2024. Adrian Holden of The Guardian described her performance as "magnetic", adding, "The role of Mary Jane ... is a perfect fit for McAdams". Variety noted that McAdams' "projection was muted at a recent performance" but added "[She] masters her portrayal of a determined caregiver continually sitting in the uncertainty of worry, despite constantly leaning toward positivity." For her performance, she earned a Tony Award for Best Actress in a Play nomination. In 2026, she was honored with a star on the Hollywood Walk of Fame.

In 2026, McAdams returned to the big screen in director Sam Raimi's survival horror thriller film Send Help, in which she starred as an employee who becomes stranded on a deserted island with her boss after a plane crash and attempts to survive while tensions rise between them. Michael Phillips of the San Francisco Chronicle described the film as a performance showcase "for McAdams' miraculous shape-shifting abilities". The film was a box-office success and grossed $64 million in the United States and Canada, and $29 million in other territories, for a worldwide total of $94 million against a $40 million production budget.

== Activism ==
=== Environmental ===
McAdams is an environmentalist. She ran an eco-friendly lifestyle website, GreenIsSexy.org, with two of her friends for five years from 2007 to 2011. Her house is powered by Bullfrog renewable energy. She travels around Toronto by bicycle and does not own a car, but drives when in Los Angeles because it is "a harder town to cycle in". She volunteered in Biloxi, Mississippi, and Louisiana in fall of 2005, as part of the clean-up effort following Hurricane Katrina. McAdams sat on a TreeHugger/Live Earth judging panel in 2007. She appealed for donations during the Canada for Haiti telethon in 2010. She was involved in Matter of Trust's "hair boom" efforts following the 2010 Gulf of Mexico oil spill. In 2011, McAdams supported Foodstock, a protest against a proposed limestone mega quarry in Melancthon, Ontario. In 2013, she filmed two promotional videos for the Food & Water First Movement, aiming to preserve prime farmland and source water in Ontario, Canada. In 2014, she narrated the feature documentary Take Me To The River, which investigates what is being done to try to save iconic rivers. In 2021, she participated in a video produced by Stand.earth calling on the government of British Columbia, Canada to stop logging the last old growth rainforests across the province.

=== Other causes ===
In 2006, McAdams took part in the "Day Without Immigrants" demonstration in Los Angeles, protesting the federal government's attempts to further criminalize immigrants living illegally in the United States. In 2011, she attended the Occupy Toronto demonstration. In 2013, McAdams volunteered with Habitat for Humanity in her hometown of St. Thomas. She has also worked with charities including the Sunshine Foundation of Canada, the Alzheimer's Association, the READ Campaign, and United Way of Canada. She is a member of Represent.Us, an anti-corruption activist organisation, and is part of its creative council.

== Public image ==
McAdams was listed on the Maxim Hot 100 in 2005 and 2013.

== Personal life ==
In 2016, McAdams started dating American screenwriter Jamie Linden. The couple have a son, born in 2018, and a daughter, born in 2020.

== Filmography ==
=== Film ===
Key
†	Denotes films that have not yet been released

Year	Title	Role
2002	My Name Is Tanino	Sally Garfield
2002	Perfect Pie	Patsy Grady (age 15)
2002	The Hot Chick	Jessica Spencer / Clive Maxtone
2004	Mean Girls	Regina George
2004	The Notebook	Allie Hamilton
2005	Wedding Crashers	Claire Cleary
2005	Red Eye	Lisa Reisert
2005	The Family Stone	Amy Stone
2007	Married Life	Kay Nesbitt
2008	The Lucky Ones	Colee Dunn
2009	State of Play	Della Frye
2009	The Time Traveler's Wife	Clare Abshire
2009	Sherlock Holmes	Irene Adler
2010	Morning Glory	Becky Fuller
2011	Midnight in Paris	Inez
2011	Sherlock Holmes: A Game of Shadows	Irene Adler
2012	The Vow	Paige Collins
2012	Passion	Christine Stanford
2012	To the Wonder	Jane
2013	About Time	Mary
2014	A Most Wanted Man	Annabel Richter
2015	Every Thing Will Be Fine	Sara
2015	The Little Prince	The Mother (voice)
2015	Aloha	Tracy Woodside
2015	Southpaw	Maureen Hope
2015	Spotlight	Sacha Pfeiffer
2016	Doctor Strange	Christine Palmer
2017	Disobedience	Esti Kuperman
2018	Game Night	Annie Davis
2020	Eurovision Song Contest: The Story of Fire Saga	Sigrit Ericksdóttir
2022	Doctor Strange in the Multiverse of Madness	Christine Palmer / Earth-838 Christine Palmer
2023	Are You There God? It's Me, Margaret.	Barbara Simon
2026	Send Help	Linda Liddle
2027	The Families Stone †	Amy Stone
2027	Lizard Music †	TBA
TBA	2034 †	TBA

=== Television ===
Year	Title	Role	Notes
2001	Shotgun Love Dolls	Beth Swanson	AKA StarBabes; unaired pilot
2001	The Famous Jett Jackson	Hannah Grant	Episode: "Food for Thought"
2002	Earth: Final Conflict	Christine Bickwell	Episode: "Atavus High"
2002	Guilt by Association	Danielle Mason	Television film
2003–2005	Slings & Arrows	Kate McNab	7 episodes
2014	Who Do You Think You Are?	Herself	Episode: "Rachel McAdams"
2015	True Detective	Antigone "Ani" Bezzerides	Main cast (season 2)
2018	Explained	Narrator	Episode: "Why Women Are Paid Less"
2021	What If...?	Christine Palmer (voice)	Episode: "What If... Doctor Strange Lost His Heart Instead of His Hands?"
2023	Dave	Herself	3 episodes
2024	Saturday Night Live	Herself	Episode: "Jacob Elordi / Reneé Rapp"

=== Theatre ===
Year	Title	Role	Playwright	Venue	Ref.
2024	Mary Jane	Mary Jane	Amy Herzog	Samuel J. Friedman Theatre, Broadway	

=== Music video ===
Year	Title	Artist
2023	"Mr. McAdams"	Lil Dicky

== Awards and nominations ==
McAdams has received numerous awards and nominations throughout her career. For her performance in Spotlight, she was awarded a Screen Actors Guild Award, Critics' Choice Movie Award, Satellite Award, and Independent Spirit Award, as well as a nomination for the Academy Award for Best Supporting Actress. McAdams has also been nominated for a BAFTA Rising Star Award and won numerous MTV Movie Awards and Teen Choice Awards.

== See also ==
- List of actors with Academy Award nominations
