= The Useless Hand =

- Fargo episode
- Episode no.: Season 5 Episode 9
- Directed by: Thomas Bezucha
- Written by: Noah Hawley
- Cinematography by: Daryl Hartwell
- Editing by: Christopher Nelson
- Production code: XFO05009
- Original air date: January 9, 2024
- Running time: 45 minutes

Guest appearances
- Rebecca Liddiard as Karen Tillman; Conrad Coates as Bowman; Jessica Pohly as Agent Meyer; Nick Gomez as Agent Joaquin; Ari Cohen as Cal Docherty

Episode chronology
← Previous "Blanket"	Next → "Bisquik"
- Fargo (season 5)

"The Useless Hand" is the ninth episode of the fifth season of the American anthology black comedy–crime drama television series Fargo. It is the 50th overall episode of the series and was written by series creator Noah Hawley, and directed by co-executive producer Thomas Bezucha. It originally aired on FX on January 9, 2024.

The season is set in Minnesota and North Dakota in the fall of 2019, and follows Dorothy "Dot" Lyon, a seemingly typical Midwestern housewife living in Scandia, Minnesota, whose mysterious past comes back to haunt her after she lands in hot water with the authorities. One of those authorities is North Dakota Sheriff Roy Tillman, who has been searching for Dot for a long time. In the episode, Dot prepares to escape the ranch, while Roy sets out a militia as he awaits the arrival of authorities.

According to Nielsen Media Research, the episode was seen by an estimated 0.517 million household viewers and gained a 0.10 ratings share among adults aged 18–49. The episode received critical acclaim, with critics praising the acting, directing, character development, tension and pacing.

== Plot ==
At a remote ice fishing cabin, Munch (Sam Spruell) has kidnapped Gator (Joe Keery) and restrained him. Gator tries to buy his way out, but Munch heats up a knife in the fire and explains he must take an eye for an eye, because Gator killed an innocent woman. Gator resists, but Munch removes his eyes.

Meanwhile, Roy (Jon Hamm) tells Bowman (Conrad Coates) to kill and bury Dot (Juno Temple), as he prepares to rally his supporters by making a video asking for their help. However, Bowman finds the barn empty, unaware that Dot managed to hide below the floorboards. Lorraine (Jennifer Jason Leigh) continues calling Danish, only to be told by Indira (Richa Moorjani), now her head of security, that his phone line died the previous night on Roy's ranch. Lorraine decides to send federal authorities to confront Roy, utilizing her financial support of the President. Indira contacts Witt (Lamorne Morris) to inform him about the incoming FBI and state troops, telling him that he has to protect Dot.

Dot sneaks her way to the house, using a phone in Roy's bedroom to contact Wayne (David Rysdahl) and Scotty (Sienna King). However, she is forced to hang up when Karen (Rebecca Liddiard) holds her at gunpoint, unwilling to let her escape and place their children in an orphanage. After failing to convince her, Dot knocks her out and escapes through a secret passageway with her rifle.

Roy's militia supporters arrive and arm themselves as Dot obtains Karen's phone and calls Lorraine to inform her about Danish's death. Lorraine tells her to hide as authorities arrive, acknowledging Dot as her daughter and confessing she is doing it for her. Federal agents, including Meyer (Jessica Pohly) and Joaquin (Nick Gomez) arrive, while Witt is given command of a rescue team to help him retrieve Dot after triangulating the cell phone signal. Roy shows up at the main gate, refusing to let them enter the ranch and threatening violence if they move forward. Dot hides in the well with Danish's corpse while Roy's henchmen and Roy himself look for her.

While searching the area, Roy finds a dead goat and is confronted by Munch, who is holding a blindfolded Gator hostage with a noose. Munch accuses Roy of using Gator to double-cross him and appears to suddenly vanish, leaving the now-blinded Gator with Roy. Roy leaves Gator behind despite his pleas, telling him that, "If there ever was a point to you, it's gone now." As Witt and the rescue team begin their infiltration of the ranch, Roy's henchmen find Dot, but are all killed by Munch. Munch frees Dot from the well and tells her that "now, the tiger is free", before dissolving into the fog. Dot turns back towards the ranch.

== Production ==
=== Development ===
In December 2023, it was reported that the ninth episode of the season would be titled "The Useless Hand", and was to be written by series creator Noah Hawley, and directed by co-executive producer Thomas Bezucha. This was Hawley's 42nd writing credit, and Bezucha's first directing credit.

=== Writing ===
Lamorne Morris gave his own explanation behind Roy's position in the episode, "Roy used to have this autonomy. He'd run this town, he'd run everything, essentially, and no one stepped in his way. He had this free reign [sic] to do whatever the hell he felt like doing. Even when people would come one by one, he's put out fires before, he's murdered people. He's done all these little things, but now he sees the entire squad coming. You see him, even in Jon's performance, where he's feeling like “Ah shit, my back is truly up against the wall.” The only way out of this is mayhem. And that's what you see."

Regarding the ending where Munch releases Dot, Sam Spruell said, "I think it's him recognizing another victim. He's trapped in sin, not of his own making, and she is trapped in this cycle of violence, also not of her own making. And so he recognizes that, I think, and that's why he sets her free."

== Reception ==
=== Viewers ===
In its original American broadcast, "The Useless Hand" was seen by an estimated 0.517 million household viewers and gained a 0.10 ratings share among adults aged 18–49, according to Nielsen Media Research. This means that 0.10 percent of all households with televisions watched the episode. This was a 12% increase in viewership from the previous episode, which was watched by 0.461 million viewers with a 0.09 in the 18-49 demographics.

=== Critical reviews ===
"The Useless Hand" received critical acclaim. Tom Philip of The A.V. Club gave the episode a "B+" grade and wrote, "There's lots to come in this week's Fargo, but I've loved every moment Joe Keery and Sam Spruell have spent on screen together these last eight weeks. Two men from entirely different worlds. One built by bravado, one built by pragmatism."

Alan Sepinwall wrote, "'The Useless Hand,' though, was pretty terrific, full of action, suspense, and big emotions. [...] Everything is converging very effectively here." Keith Phipps of Vulture gave the episode a 4 star rating out of 5 and wrote, "I briefly feared Fargo peaked with all that mid-season excitement, but clearly not. This episode starts to bring all the plot threads together without underselling the characters. It's been a season filled with violence but also a series of battles of wills. All that ends with the next episode, and, at this point, there's no obvious conclusion in sight."

Scott Tobias of The New York Times wrote, "Munch does his part to liberate her by taking them out and lifting her to freedom. “To fight a tiger in a cage is not a fair fight,” he tells her. His beef with Roy appears to be settled. Or maybe he just respects her agency. And prowess." Sean T. Collins of Decider wrote, "Fargo gave us the apotheosis of Sheriff Roy Tillman. Yes, he tosses off one fascist bon mot after another, from “We'll show these godless huns how a patriot dies a-singin'!” to 'Go and live... or stay and die.” Meanwhile he's too scared of his own feelings to comfort his maimed child or murder his abused ex-wife himself."
