= Sweet Land =

- Theatrical poster
- Directed by: Ali Selim
- Written by: Ali Selim
- Based on: "A Gravestone Made of Wheat" by Will Weaver
- Produced by: James Bigham; Alan Cumming; Ali Selim
- Starring: Elizabeth Reaser; Tim Guinee; Lois Smith; Alex Kingston; Paul Sand; Tom Gilroy; Robert Hogan; Jodie Markell; John Heard; Patrick Heusinger; Ned Beatty; Alan Cumming
- Cinematography: David Tumblety
- Edited by: James Stanger
- Music by: Mark Orton
- Distributed by: Libero LLC
- Release dates: October 21, 2005 (Hamptons International Film Festival); December 1, 2006 (United States)
- Running time: 110 minutes
- Country: United States
- Language: English

Sweet Land is a 2005 American independent period drama film written and directed by Ali Selim. It is an adaptation of the 1989 short story "A Gravestone Made of Wheat" by Will Weaver. The film stars Elizabeth Reaser, Tim Guinee, Lois Smith, Ned Beatty, John Heard, Alex Kingston and Alan Cumming. It premiered at the Hamptons International Film Festival on October 21, 2005, and went into limited release on December 1, 2006. The film won an Independent Spirit Award for Best First Feature.

== Plot ==
In the aftermath of World War I, Inge Altenberg, an orphan from Snåsa Municipality, Norway, arrives in America to a very cold reception. The parents of immigrant farmer Olaf Torvik remain in Norway, where they met her. Dialogue reveals that the four of them have worked out an agreement that allowed her to emigrate to America for the purpose of marrying Olaf. The Minnesota farming village of Audubon, in which her intended husband lives, is horrified to learn that she is a German immigrant with no papers. To make matters worse, she has accidentally obtained membership papers for the American Socialist Party. Scandalized, both the town's Lutheran minister and the county clerk refuse to marry them.

When events lead them to openly cohabit with each other, they find themselves ostracized by the entire town. They are then forced to harvest their crop completely by hand and alone. This particular harvest season brings not only work, but love as well.

== Cast ==
- Elizabeth Reaser as young Inge Altenberg
  - Lois Smith as old Inge
- Patrick Heusinger as young Lars
  - Stephen Pelinski as old Lars
- Tim Guinee as young Olaf Torvik
  - Robert Hogan as old Olaf
- Alan Cumming as young Frandsen
  - Paul Sand as old Frandsen
- Jodie Markell as Donna Torvik
- Ned Beatty as Harmo
- John Heard as Minister Sorrensen
- Alex Kingston as Brownie
- Tom Gilroy as Comrade Vik

== Production ==
=== Early development ===
Director Ali Selim first read Will Weaver's short story "A Gravestone Made of Wheat" in 1989 in the Sunday magazine of the Star Tribune, a Minneapolis newspaper. After purchasing the film rights, he spent much of the 1990s working on a script in his spare time as he worked as a director of television commercials.

Two early supporters of the project were actors Alan Cumming, who played Frandsen, and Gil Bellows, who signed on as a co-producer. Selim met Cumming while screening a short film in Los Angeles; he knew Bellows from directing him in a steak-sauce commercial. Bellows helped Selim get the script into workshops in Los Angeles, where the reaction was positive; however, no Hollywood studios were interested in making the film.

In 2004, Selim raised about $1 million to produce the film himself, mostly from private investors in Minnesota, and pre-production began in July, with shooting planned for that fall.

=== Casting ===
Dan Futterman, whom Selim also had directed in commercials, was originally cast as Olaf but had to drop out when his film Capote went into production. Futterman suggested Tim Guinee as his replacement.

The role of Frandsen, a character that does not appear in the short story, was written for Alan Cumming. Alex Kingston was a friend of Cumming's from their early days in London.

Elizabeth Reaser signed on after another actress dropped out because of a scheduling conflict. Reaser initially balked at having to master her multilingual dialogue on such short notice, and she tried to back out of the audition. Her agent talked her out of it, and she got the part.

Selim said on the film's DVD commentary that Ned Beatty, who has a summer home in his wife's hometown in northern Minnesota, said he took a role in the film to impress his in-laws—although he later confessed that he also liked the script.

=== Filming ===
Sweet Land was filmed in 24 days in October 2004 in and around Montevideo, a city in Chippewa County, Minnesota. Reaser does not speak German and had to learn her lines phonetically despite only four sessions with a dialogue coach.

The film uses some computer-generated graphics: The northern lights in the scene where Inge walks through the fields to Olaf's house to take a bath (the scene was actually filmed in the daytime), and, later in the film, the geese flying over Olaf's house.

== Distribution ==
=== Theatrical ===
Selim entered Sweet Land in several film festivals, and despite a positive reception and some awards, no Hollywood distributor would take it on. Eventually, Jeff Lipsky, formerly of October Films, agreed to distribute it, and Sweet Land opened in limited release on December 1, 2006. Initially released only in Minneapolis-St. Paul and New York, the film was rolled out gradually to other markets over the next several months.

=== Home media ===
Sweet Land secured a national DVD distribution deal with 20th Century Fox, who released the film on DVD on July 10, 2007.

== Reception ==
Sweet Land received mostly positive reviews, which focused on the simplicity of its story, the beauty of its cinematography, and its strong sense of place. Entertainment Weekly and the Los Angeles Times named the film one of the ten best of 2006. Kenneth Turan of the Los Angeles Times wrote Sweet Land "is a type of American independent we don't see often enough, a beautifully photographed film (in 35-millimeter no less) that celebrates its regional identity. In addition, it's sure-footed enough to tread on the borders of sentimentality without falling into that ever-seductive trap."

On review aggregate website Rotten Tomatoes, Sweet Land has an 85% rating based on 72 reviews. The site's critics consensus reads, "Finding the right balance between subtle and sentimental, Sweet Land moves beyond other similarly-themed dramas with evocative cinematography that plays an equal role to the talented cast."

=== Box office ===
Although Sweet Land did not get a wide national release, by the end of December 2006 it approached $1 million in receipts. The film remained in theaters for 37 weeks, often in limited engagements at independent theaters, primarily in the Midwest. The film's final gross was $1.8 million.

=== Accolades ===
- 2005 Hamptons International Film Festival: Audience Award for Best Narrative Feature
- 2006 Florida Film Festival: Audience Award for Best Narrative Feature
- 2007 Independent Spirit Awards: Best First Feature

== Musical adaptation ==
The film was adapted into a stage musical by producer Perrin Post and playwright Laurie Flanigan Hegge, with music and lyrics by Hegge and Dina Maccabee. The musical premiered at the History Theatre in St. Paul in 2017.
