= Red Earth, White Earth =

1986 novel by Will Weaver

- First edition
- Author: Will Weaver
- Language: English
- Genre: Young adult novel
- Publisher: Simon & Schuster
- Publication date: 1986
- Publication place: United States
- Media type: Print (hardcover)

Red Earth, White Earth is a novel by Will Weaver, about conflicts between white farmers and native Ojibwes in northern Minnesota. The story follows Guy Pehrsson, a California computer entrepreneur who returns to Minnesota twelve years after he ran away at age eighteen. His childhood blood brother, Tom Little Wolf, is now a tribal lawyer intent on reclaiming farmlands mishandled in past treaties, lands which include the Pehrsson's homestead. The novel explores the friendship between the two throughout their boyhood and into adulthood, and finally, to their reunion.

The novel was published in 1986 by Simon & Schuster, and was produced as a CBS television film in 1989, directed by David Greene and starring Timothy Daly, Richard Farnsworth, Billy Merasty and Alberta Watson.
