= Bisquik =

- Fargo episode
- Episode no.: Season 5 Episode 10
- Directed by: Thomas Bezucha
- Written by: Noah Hawley
- Cinematography by: Daryl Hartwell
- Editing by: Regis Kimble
- Production code: XFO05010
- Original air date: January 16, 2024
- Running time: 45 minutes

Guest appearances
- Jessica Pohly as Agent Meyer; Nick Gomez as Agent Joaquin; Rebecca Liddiard as Karen Tillman; Ari Cohen as Cal Docherty; Shane Marriott as Agent Sykes

Episode chronology
← Previous "The Useless Hand"	Next → —
- Fargo (season 5)

"Bisquik" is the tenth episode and season finale of the fifth season of the American anthology black comedy–crime drama television series Fargo. It is the 51st overall episode of the series and was written by series creator Noah Hawley, and directed by co-executive producer Thomas Bezucha. It originally aired on FX on January 16, 2024.

The season is set in Minnesota and North Dakota in the fall of 2019, and follows Dorothy "Dot" Lyon, a seemingly typical Midwestern housewife living in Scandia, Minnesota, whose mysterious past comes back to haunt her after she lands in hot water with the authorities. One of those authorities is North Dakota Sheriff Roy Tillman, who has been searching for Dot for a long time. In the episode, Dot and Roy face off just as the police and the militia prepare to start a gunfight.

According to Nielsen Media Research, the episode was seen by an estimated 0.601 million household viewers and gained a 0.11 ratings share among adults aged 18–49. The episode received critical acclaim, with critics praising the closure to the storylines, writing, directing, performances, and final scene.

== Plot ==
A blinded Gator (Joe Keery) makes his way through the dugout while Odin's (Michael Copeman) militia prepares for an ambush at the ranch. The end of the dugout takes him far outside the ranch, where he starts hearing voices from the ranch and follows them. Roy (Jon Hamm) is mocked by his father-in-law Odin for failing to catch Dot (Juno Temple), not disciplining his wife Karen (Rebecca Liddiard) and leading everyone into the current situation. Roy pretends to accept Odin's offer of a fistfight to settle their differences, but instead slits his throat with a knife he was hiding.

Odin's murder is witnessed by Karen, who flees with Roy in pursuit. Roy stumbles upon Dot, who shoots him in the stomach with a rifle. Before she can kill him, the FBI arrives and arrests Karen. The militia opens fire, allowing Roy to escape through the dugout with Witt (Lamorne Morris) chasing him. Witt catches up to Roy, who stabs and kills him. Escaping the dugout, Roy is arrested by the FBI, with agents Meyer (Jessica Pohly) and Joaquin (Nick Gomez) revealing that Gator gave him away. Gator apologizes to Dot as paramedics tend to the two, and she promises to visit him in jail. She is devastated upon learning of Witt's death and reunites with Wayne (David Rysdahl), Scotty (Sienna King) and Lorraine (Jennifer Jason Leigh), the latter allowing Dot an uncharacteristic hug and admitting that she is proud of her.

One year later, on the anniversary of Witt's death, his grave is visited by Dot, Scotty and Indira (Richa Moorjani). Dot reveals that she is now more involved in Wayne's work as a car salesman. Roy is serving his prison sentence in Illinois, where he has fully embraced the ideologies of the Aryan Brotherhood and is visited by Lorraine and Indira. After he gloats over his rise in the prison hierarchy, Lorraine smugly reveals that she has used her immense power in the Federalist Society to ensure that the judges will deny any appeal. She also reveals that she has created a private fund that will receive monthly payments to help prisoners pay off their debts, and that most of Roy's fellow inmates are indebted; In return for the money, his cellmates will sexually and physically assault him but keep him alive, as Lorraine wants him to experience the suffering he put upon his wives. Roy, realizing he is certain to lose his lofty position amongst the prisoners, stares in horror as Lorraine leaves.

Dot and Scotty return home to find Wayne talking to Munch (Sam Spruell), who reveals that he has come to restore balance by taking his "pound of flesh" from Dot in return for the injuries she gave him when he tried to kidnap her. He explains that he freed Dot so she could fight Roy fairly, but that his business with her is unfinished. Seemingly unaware of the threat Munch poses, Wayne and Scotty treat him with kindness, for which he is grateful but unsure how to react. He tries to explain his reasons for being there and press the matter of Dot's debt, but she challenges his worldview and causes him to ponder that there may be legitimate reasons why some debts can simply be forgiven. She offers him the chance to sit and eat with her family, but only if he helps with the cooking, so she teaches him how to make biscuits from a box of Bisquik. He joins the family for dinner.

Munch opens up about his past, revealing himself as a 500-year-old sin-eater from Europe ("across the sea") and detailing the inner pain his curse of immortality has since inflicted upon him. It is not revealed if the family believes his claims or still thinks he is speaking in metaphors; nevertheless, Dot tells him that his curse was caused by eating a meal made from sin, so it stands to reason that he can be forgiven by eating a meal made with love. She gives him a biscuit and he hesitantly takes a bite, after which a euphoric smile slowly spreads across his face.

== Production ==
=== Development ===
In December 2023, it was reported that the tenth and final episode of the season would be titled "Bisquik", and was to be written by series creator Noah Hawley, and directed by co-executive producer Thomas Bezucha. This was Hawley's 43rd writing credit, and Bezucha's second directing credit.

=== Writing ===
Noah Hawley said that he wanted to depict figures of authority working together for the greater good: "My hope was by saying, 'All right, we have the state cop that Lamorne Morris plays, and we have the local cop that Richa Moorjani plays, and we have this FBI, and the way that they're going to solve this is to work together—against the 'I am the law' guy. We need those stories now that reinforce for us that that's how justice is done. It takes a lot of people. It's a cooperative effort."

For the final scene, Hawley wanted to answer to the "mutual injury" which befell Munch: "They reach this place, and it's a very tense back and forth over many minutes as to whether he's going to harm this family or she's going to win out. And in the end, she wins out, because she tells him that there's forgiveness there for him and that he feels dirty because all he's been doing is sinning for a long time, and now all he feels is the sin. She says, 'Well, yes, we can be made to feel that way. But the only way to move past this is you gotta forgive yourself and be forgiving.'" Sam Spruell gave his own interpretation of the scene: "I think it's funny. It is nice when things end with an act of hope. And so I would like to think that just that gesture, just her offer, and his acceptance of her offer breaks the cycle, and he's set free to live a life that can accept love."

== Reception ==
=== Viewers ===
In its original American broadcast, "Bisquik" was seen by an estimated 0.601 million household viewers and gained a 0.11 ratings share among adults aged 18–49, according to Nielsen Media Research. This means that 0.11 percent of all households with televisions watched the episode. This was a 16% increase in viewership from the previous episode, which was watched by 0.517 million viewers with a 0.10 in the 18-49 demographics.

=== Critical reviews ===
"Bisquik" received critical acclaim. Tom Philip of The A.V. Club gave the episode an "A–" grade and wrote, "This has been my favorite season since the first, getting back to the 'wicked and playful' vibe that escaped the lesser entries in the middle there. I'm down for another round."

Alan Sepinwall of Rolling Stone wrote, "After that underwhelming fourth installment, Season Five had a lot of work to do to argue that Hawley still had interesting stories to tell in this ongoing shuffled Coen brothers playlist. Season Five — this finale especially — more than accomplished that task."

Keith Phipps of Vulture gave the episode a 4 star rating out of 5 and wrote, "This season, which began in a riot, has offered a tour of the brutality just beneath the surface of Fargo's Minnesota Nice, but maybe in some places the niceness isn't merely superficial. Maybe it's real enough to make even Ole smile." Scott Tobias of The New York Times wrote, "The ending is the kind of sentimental moment that would be anathema to the Coens, but it's not out of place philosophically with the original Fargo. When Marge Gunderson has one of the kidnappers in the back of her squad car and talks to him about the shame of what has happened over 'a little bit of money,' she is asserting the same bedrock values that Dot is expressing here. In the film, it's purely rhetorical because the man in the back of the squad car is beyond hope. But that's not true of Ole Munch. He's traded in misery his whole life. Kindness stirs his soul like a whisk."

Sean T. Collins of Decider wrote, "I've seen how things work out for these men, how if they're lucky they smile in death. Ole Munch gets to smile in life, for life. I'm glad I saw it. I'm glad I watched this show."

=== Accolades ===
TVLine named Sam Spruell as the "Performer of the Week" for the week of January 20, 2024, for his performance in the episode. The site wrote, "He launched into a sprawling, verbose monologue about his younger days eating the bitter sins of men, with Spruell spinning a web of vividly weird imagery. But Dot offered him a chance at redemption via a freshly baked biscuit, and Ole took it, first closing his eyes with pleasure as he bit into the biscuit, then breaking into a wide, ecstatic smile. It was a triumph of good over evil, and Spruell reminded us that even the most hardened of killers can be won over by a nice home-cooked meal."
