= Thomas Bezucha =

American filmmaker

- Born: Thomas Gordon Bezucha; March 8, 1964 (age 62); Amherst, Massachusetts, U.S.
- Occupations: Screenwriter; director; film producer
- Years active: 2000–present

Thomas Gordon Bezucha (/bəˈzuːkə/; born March 8, 1964) is an American filmmaker.

== Life and career ==
Bezucha was born and raised in Amherst, Massachusetts, and graduated from Amherst Regional High School in 1982.

Bezucha graduated in fashion design from the Parsons School of Design, and worked as a creative services executive for Polo Ralph Lauren and Coach.

He wrote and directed the films Big Eden (2000), The Family Stone (2005), Monte Carlo (2011), and Let Him Go (2020). He also co-wrote the films The Guernsey Literary and Potato Peel Pie Society (2018) and The Good House (2021).

Bezucha is openly gay.

== Filmography ==
Film

Year	Title	Director	Writer	Producer	Ref.
2000	Big Eden	Yes	Yes	No	
2005	The Family Stone	Yes	Yes	No	
2011	Monte Carlo	Yes	Yes	No	
2018	The Guernsey Literary and Potato Peel Pie Society	No	Yes	No	
2020	Let Him Go	Yes	Yes	Yes	
2022	The Good House	No	Yes	No	
2027	The Families Stone	Yes	Yes	No	Filming

Television

Year	Title	Director	Writer	Executive Producer	Notes	Ref.
2024	Fargo	Yes	Yes	No	Wrote episode "Blanket"; Directed episodes "The Useless Hand" and "Bisquik"	
2025	Untamed	Yes	No	Yes	Directed episodes "A Celestial Event" and "Jane Doe"	
