= Tyrone Giordano =

American actor

- Born: April 18, 1976 (age 50); Hartford, Connecticut, U.S.
- Education: Gallaudet University
- Occupation: Actor

Tyrone Giordano (born 1976) is a deaf American film, television, and stage actor. He is known for his roles in the musical Big River and the movie The Family Stone and in the Signing Naturally textbook.

== Early life and education ==
Giordano was born in Hartford, Connecticut to deaf parents. He went to Montgomery Blair High School in Silver Spring, Maryland, and Gallaudet University in Washington, DC.

== Career ==
In 1999, Giordano was a member of a small troupe of deaf and hearing actors when he won his first professional role as a member of the Chorus in the Arena Stage production of The Miracle Worker. In 2001, he enrolled in Deaf West Theatre's summer school program, and that fall he was cast in the lead role of Huckleberry Finn in the critically acclaimed Big River in Los Angeles. Big River was a hit at Deaf West Theatre and made a second run at the Mark Taper Forum. Big River continued its journey, returning to Broadway at the American Airlines Theatre in the summer of 2003, retaining some of its original cast members from 2001 and 2002. For his Broadway performance, Giordano was nominated for a 2004 Drama Desk Award for Outstanding Actor in a Musical, losing out to Hugh Jackman. The Broadway cast of Big River was honored with a 2004 Tony Honors for Excellence in Theatre. Giordano remained with Big River for most of its year-long national tour (June 2004-June 2005) as well as its run in Japan.

While touring with Big River, Giordano was cast in The Family Stone (2005), in which he played a gay and deaf member of the title family. He also plays the deaf brother of Ashton Kutcher's character in the 2005 film A Lot Like Love and was also in 2008's Untraceable starring Diane Lane and in 2010's The Next Three Days with Russell Crowe. He has appeared in episodes of the TV series Girlfriends and CSI: Crime Scene Investigation.

In 2009, Giordano was onstage as Pippin at the Mark Taper Forum. In 2017, he was in Edward Albee's At Home at the Zoo at the Wallis Annenberg Center for the Performing Arts.

== Filmography ==
=== Film ===
Year	Title	Role	Notes
2005	A Lot Like Love	Graham Martin	
2005	The Family Stone	Thad Stone	
2008	Untraceable	Tim Wilks	
2009	Simone	Simon	
2009	All About Steve	Dad	
2010	The Next Three Days	Mike	
2027	The Families Stone	Thad Stone	Filming

=== Television ===
Year	Title	Role	Notes
2010	Out of Practice	Dr. Robert Winslow	1 episode
2007	What About Brian	Mark	1 episode
2007	Girlfriends	Josh	1 episode
2011	CSI: Crime Scene Investigation	Michael Bowman	1 episode
2025	Washington Black	Peter Haas	Miniseries, 3 episodes
