= The Family Stone =

2005 film by Thomas Bezucha

- Theatrical release poster
- Directed by: Thomas Bezucha
- Written by: Thomas Bezucha
- Produced by: Michael London
- Starring: Claire Danes; Diane Keaton; Rachel McAdams; Dermot Mulroney; Craig T. Nelson; Sarah Jessica Parker; Luke Wilson
- Cinematography: Jonathan Brown
- Edited by: Jeffrey Ford
- Music by: Michael Giacchino
- Production companies: Fox 2000 Pictures; Red Carpet Productions
- Distributed by: 20th Century Fox
- Release date: December 16, 2005
- Running time: 103 minutes
- Country: United States
- Language: English
- Budget: $18 million
- Box office: $92.9 million

The Family Stone is a 2005 American Christmas comedy-drama film written and directed by Thomas Bezucha. Produced by Michael London and distributed by 20th Century Fox, it stars an ensemble cast, including Claire Danes, Diane Keaton, Rachel McAdams, Dermot Mulroney, Craig T. Nelson, Sarah Jessica Parker, and Luke Wilson.

The plot follows the Christmas holiday misadventures of the Stone family in a small New England town when the eldest son (Mulroney) brings his uptight girlfriend (Parker) home with the intention of proposing to her with a cherished heirloom ring. Overwhelmed by the hostile reception, she begs her sister to join her for emotional support, which triggers further complications.

The Family Stone was released in the United States on December 16, 2005. The film garnered mixed critical reviews, but was a commercial success, with a worldwide gross of $92.9 million. Parker was nominated for a Golden Globe Award for her performance, while Keaton, Nelson, and McAdams each garnered a Satellite Award nomination.

== Plot ==
Everett Stone takes Meredith, his anxious, bumbling and tightly wound girlfriend, to spend the Christmas holiday with his bohemian family in New England. The two arrive at Everett's family home, where they join his parents, Kelly, an English professor, and his wife, Sybil, as well as his four younger siblings, Ben, Susannah, Thad, and Amy.

Everett's tight-knit family responds awkwardly, and soon sternly, to Meredith's stiffness, making her feel like an outsider. In particular, Sybil and Amy treat Meredith with aloofness and believe her to be a poor match for Everett. While Kelly is gracious toward Meredith, Ben is the only one who seems to genuinely like her.

After a series of embarrassing moments, Meredith opts to stay at the local inn and convinces her younger sister Julie to join her for support. Everett finds himself drawn to the friendly, more outgoing Julie. His family also immediately receives her very warmly after she has a fall while getting off the bus.

Meredith desperately tries to fit in with the Stones, but her strained attempts prove disastrous. Meanwhile, Kelly confides in Ben that Sybil's breast cancer has recurred and is terminal. During Christmas Eve dinner, Everett's gay, deaf brother Thad and his partner Patrick express their plans to adopt a child, prompting a discussion about nature versus nurture and sexual orientation.

When Meredith clumsily attempts to engage in the conversation, her choice of words offends everyone and Kelly angrily shuts her down. Distraught, she attempts to drive off but crashes Everett's car, and Ben comes to comfort her. His attraction to her is apparent and the two of them end up at a local bar.

There, after several drinks, Meredith begins to relax and enjoy herself. She invites local paramedic Brad Stevenson, Amy's high school boyfriend, to the Stones' house for Christmas breakfast. The next morning, Meredith awakens in Ben's bed and incorrectly assumes that they had sex.

On Christmas Day, the rest of the Stone children learn of Sybil's cancer prognosis. Sybil, who originally refused Everett's request for his grandmother's ring to propose to Meredith, reconsiders her position and offers it to him. However, by now his feelings for Meredith have shifted to her sister Julie.

In a moment of emotional confusion or clarity, Everett asks Julie to try on the ring, and it gets stuck on her finger. When she and Meredith lock themselves in the bathroom to get the ring off, they assume Everett is about to propose to Meredith.

The family exchanges gifts and Meredith, unaware of Sybil's failing health, presents each family member with a framed, enlarged photograph of Sybil taken when she was pregnant with Amy, having mistaken it for a photograph of her pregnant with Everett. Everyone is moved by her gesture, and Meredith relaxes slightly, but when Everett asks to talk to her, she blurts out that she will not marry him.

Everett counters that he did not plan to ask her, so Meredith emotionally breaks down in front of the family. Further chaos erupts when Everett begins fighting with Ben, and Sybil and Amy accidentally bump into Meredith in the kitchen, causing her to spill a pan of uncooked strata all over herself and the floor. The interpersonal tensions between the family eventually calm that evening, and Everett sees Julie off to the bus station, while Meredith finds comfort in Ben.

One year later, the family again reunites at the Stone house for Christmas, without Sybil, who has since died. Meredith and Ben are now a couple, as are Everett and Julie, and Amy and Brad. Thad and Patrick have adopted a baby boy named Gus, and Susannah, the oldest daughter, has had another baby boy named Johnny. The family gathers in the living room, where Meredith's gifted portrait of Sybil hangs on the wall.

== Cast ==
- Claire Danes as Julie Morton
- Diane Keaton as Sybil Stone
- Rachel McAdams as Amy Stone
- Dermot Mulroney as Everett Stone
- Craig T. Nelson as Kelly Stone
- Sarah Jessica Parker as Meredith Morton
- Luke Wilson as Ben Stone
- Ty Giordano as Thad Stone
- Brian White as Patrick Thomas
- Elizabeth Reaser as Susannah Stone Trousdale
- Paul Schneider as Brad Stevenson
- Savannah Stehlin as Elizabeth Trousdale
- Jamie Kaler as John Trousdale

== Production ==
=== Development ===
Writer-director Thomas Bezucha developed the idea for The Family Stone based on an experience with his own family: "My sister [was] dating someone, and the family didn't think it was a great match." Bezucha wrote a screenplay under the working title F---ing Hate Her, which he pitched the same week that Meet the Parents (2000)—a film with a similar theme of hostile in-laws—was released.

After several years of delays, the project, which Bezucha eventually re-titled The Family Stone, was optioned by 20th Century Fox.

=== Casting ===
Keaton was the first actor approached to star in the film. With her attachment to the project, Bezucha and producer Michael London were able to recruit other actors from their wish list. Keaton stated that she was instantly drawn to her role, as the many layers to Sybil's personality allowed her "to explore so many — often conflicting — emotions."

Sarah Jessica Parker was cast amid the final season of her HBO series Sex and the City; at the time, Parker, who had struggled to find a role that distinguished her from her TV character Carrie Bradshaw, declared Meredith a breakaway from her previous roles: "She is... controlling, rigid and tightly wound. When she tries to dig herself out of awkward moments, she only makes matters worse." McAdams, cast in the role of Amy Stone, said she felt "drawn to the dramatic arc that Amy goes through, which eventually brings her full circle. She sees herself as honest, not mean, and expresses that uncensored candor in her sardonic wit."

=== Filming ===
The exterior of the Stone family home was filmed in Connecticut, while the town sequences were shot on location in Madison, New Jersey. Filming also occurred in New York, as well as some interior sequences which were shot in Culver City and Los Angeles, California.

== Soundtrack ==
Songs heard on the film's soundtrack include:

- "Let It Snow! Let It Snow! Let It Snow!" performed by Dean Martin
- "Jingle Bells" performed by Johnny Mercer
- "Fooled Around and Fell in Love" performed by Elvin Bishop
- "Miracles" and "Count on Me" performed by Jefferson Starship
- "Right Back Where We Started From" performed by Maxine Nightingale
- "Have Yourself a Merry Little Christmas" performed by Judy Garland in the movie Meet Me in St. Louis, which Susannah watches in a scene.

== Release ==
The Family Stone was released theatrically in the United States by 20th Century Fox on December 16, 2005.

=== Home media ===
20th Century Fox Home Entertainment released The Family Stone on DVD on May 2, 2006.

== Reception ==
=== Box office ===
The Family Stone grossed $60.1 million in the United States and Canada, and $32.8 million in other territories, for a worldwide total of $92.9 million. In the United States and Canada, the film grossed $12.5 million from 2,466 theaters on its opening weekend, ranking third behind King Kong and The Chronicles of Narnia: The Lion, the Witch and the Wardrobe.

=== Critical response ===
On the review aggregator website Rotten Tomatoes, the film holds an approval rating of 52% based on 159 reviews, with an average rating of 5.9/10. The website's critics consensus reads, "This family holiday dramedy features fine performances but awkward shifts of tone." On Metacritic, which assigns a weighted average score out of 100 to reviews from mainstream critics, the film received an average score of 56, based on 35 reviews, indicating "mixed or average" reviews. Audiences surveyed by CinemaScore gave the film an average grade "B+" on an A+ to F scale.

Manohla Dargis of The New York Times wrote "All happy families resemble one another, Tolstoy famously wrote, and each unhappy family is unhappy in its own way, but Tolstoy didn't know the Stones, who are happy in a Hollywood kind of way and unhappy in a self-help kind of way. This tribe of ravenous cannibals bares its excellent teeth at anyone who doesn't accommodate the family's preening self-regard."

In contrast, Roger Ebert of the Chicago Sun-Times gave the film three stars out of four, saying the film "is silly at times, leaning toward the screwball tradition of everyone racing around the house at the same time in a panic fueled by serial misunderstandings [but] there is also a thoughtful side, involving the long and loving marriage of Sybil and Kelly." In Variety, Justin Chang called the film "a smart, tart but mildly undercooked Christmas pudding" and added the "lovingly mounted ensembler [sic] has many heartfelt moments and a keen ear for the rhythms of domestic life, which make the neatly gift-wrapped outcome somewhat disappointing."

Kenneth Turan of the Los Angeles Times said, "A contemporary version of the traditional screwball romantic comedy, The Family Stone is a film that's at times as ragged and shaggy as its family unit. But as written and directed by Thomas Bezucha, its offbeat mixture of highly choreographed comic crises and the occasional bite of reality make for an unexpectedly enticing blend." In Rolling Stone, Peter Travers rated the film three out of four stars and added, "It's a comedy with a dash of tragedy – the kind of thing that usually makes me puke. But I fell for this one ... Writer-director Thomas Bezucha lays it on thick, but he knows the mad-dog anarchy of family life and gives the laughs a sharp comic edge."

=== Accolades ===
Award	Year	Category	Recipients	Result	Ref.
AARP Movies for Grownups Awards	2006	Best Comedy for Grownups	The Family Stone	Nominated	
AARP Movies for Grownups Awards	2006	Best Grownup Love Story	Craig T. Nelson, Diane Keaton	Won	
American Cinema Editors	2006	Best Edited Feature Film – Comedy or Musical	Jeffrey Ford	Nominated	
Casting Society of America	2006	Best Feature Film Casting – Comedy	Mindy Marin	Nominated	
GLAAD Media Awards	2006	Outstanding Film – Wide Release		Nominated	
Golden Globe Awards	2006	Best Actress – Motion Picture Musical or Comedy	Sarah Jessica Parker	Nominated	
Hollywood Film Festival	2006	Breakthrough Actress of the Year (also for Red Eye and Wedding Crashers)	Rachel McAdams	Won	
New York Film Critics Circle	2005	Best Supporting Actress	Diane Keaton	Nominated	
Satellite Awards	2005	Best Supporting Actor – Musical or Comedy	Craig T. Nelson	Nominated	
Satellite Awards	2005	Best Supporting Actress – Musical or Comedy	Diane Keaton	Nominated	
Satellite Awards	2005	Best Supporting Actress – Musical or Comedy	Rachel McAdams	Nominated	
Teen Choice Awards	2006	Choice Movie: Actress Comedy (also for Wedding Crashers)	Rachel McAdams	Won	

== Sequel ==
In an interview with CNN in November 2025, Bezucha revealed that he had been working on a sequel to the film after the death of Diane Keaton. In September 2026, it was announced that the follow-up, titled The Families Stone, was in development at Searchlight Pictures, with Bezucha returning as writer and director alongside the original cast. Production is set to begin in New York during the fall. Jean Smart will join the original cast of Claire Danes, Rachel McAdams, Dermot Mulroney, Craig T. Nelson, Sarah Jessica Parker, Luke Wilson, Ty Giordano, Brian White, Elizabeth Reaser, Paul Schneider, Savannah Stehlin, and Jamie Kaler.

== See also ==
- List of films featuring the deaf and hard of hearing
- List of Christmas films
