= The Tender Trap =

The Tender Trap may refer to:

- The Tender Trap (play), a 1954 Broadway play
- The Tender Trap (film), a 1955 movie based on the play, starring Debbie Reynolds and Frank Sinatra
- The Tender Trap (club), a cabaret nightclub
- The Tender Trap (Fargo), an episode of the American television series Fargo
- "(Love Is) The Tender Trap", a song written for the movie, popularized by Frank Sinatra
- The Tender Trap (album), a 1998 Stacey Kent album
- Tender Trap, a UK indie rock/twee pop band
