= Linda (Fargo) =

- Fargo episode
- Episode no.: Season 5 Episode 7
- Directed by: Sylvain White
- Written by: Noah Hawley; April Shih
- Cinematography by: Daryl Hartwell
- Editing by: Robin August
- Production code: XFO05007
- Original air date: December 26, 2023
- Running time: 47 minutes

Guest appearances
- Kari Matchett as Linda Tillman; Queeny Kuffour as Lynda; Sorika Wolf as Lindo; Clare Coulter as Irma; Laurent Pitre as Irma's Son; Kristin Rudrüd as Jean Lundegaard (photograph)

Episode chronology
| ← Previous "The Tender Trap" | Next → "Blanket" |
- Fargo season 5

"Linda" is the seventh episode of the fifth season of the American anthology black comedy–crime drama television series Fargo. It is the 48th overall episode of the series and was written by series creator Noah Hawley and April Shih, and directed by Sylvain White. It originally aired on FX on December 26, 2023.

The season is set in Minnesota and North Dakota in the fall of 2019, and follows Dorothy "Dot" Lyon, a seemingly typical Midwestern housewife living in Scandia, Minnesota, whose mysterious past comes back to haunt her after she lands in hot water with the authorities. One of those authorities is North Dakota Sheriff Roy Tillman, who has been searching for Dot for a long time. In the episode, Dot embarks on a journey to right some past wrongs, and Gator escalates his conflict with Munch.

According to Nielsen Media Research, the episode was seen by an estimated 0.576 million household viewers and gained a 0.08 ratings share among adults aged 18–49. The episode received extremely positive reviews from critics, who praised the episode's originality and information regarding Dot's past. However, some weren't enthralled with the episode's twist.

== Plot ==
At the house owned by the elderly Irma (Clare Coulter), her son (Laurent Pitre) arrives, verbally abusing her and asking for money. When he discovers Munch (Sam Spruell) is living there, he demands Munch start paying rent. Munch hands him a large roll of bills, but as the son starts to leave with the money, Munch murders him with an axe.

Dot (Juno Temple), driving a long distance, nearly falls asleep while dreaming of her family before stopping for pancakes at a roadside diner. Continuing her trip, she uncovers a cache containing a postcard for Camp Utopia (signed "Linda"). There, she learns that Linda Tillman (Kari Matchett), Roy's (Jon Hamm) first wife, is operating a refuge for women who have left abusive partners, all of them taking the name "Linda" during their stay. Dot's return to Camp Utopia is initially rocky; she struggles to fit in with the camp's routines and accuses Linda of being complicit in her abuse by Roy and disappearing from her life. As Linda denies this, the camp organizes a "trial" for the two via a puppet show to defend their versions of events.

Meanwhile, Gator (Joe Keery) loads a rifle and tracks the signal to Munch's car, finding him rocking in a chair inside a nearby house. He shoots at the figure through the window, but it was only the corpse of Irma's son, being rocked by a concealed Munch pulling a rope. Gator attempts to retrieve the bag of money still sitting in Munch's car but is attacked by Irma. Gator pushes her away, causing her to hit her head on the sidewalk, killing her. Munch comes outside and surveys the scene with an anguished look.

During the "trial", Dot tells the story of how after a string of juvenile delinquency, she was taken in by the Tillman family and saw the abuse Roy inflicted on Linda. Dot explains that Linda pushed her onto Roy and that Roy would abuse her when Linda wasn't around. Eventually, Linda escaped, and Roy married Dot — continuing the cycle of abuse. The "trial" convinces Linda to return with Dot as a witness to have Roy arrested. However, Dot snaps back into reality at the diner, revealing the Camp Utopia sequence to be a dream. As she leaves, an accident on the icy road knocks her unconscious. As Dot awakens in the hospital, asking for Linda (believing her dream to have been real due to a concussion), the nurse calls for her waiting "husband" who turns out to be Roy.

== Production ==
=== Development ===
In November 2023, it was reported that the seventh episode of the season would be titled "Linda", and was to be written by series creator Noah Hawley and April Shih, and directed by Sylvain White. This was Hawley's 40th writing credit, Shih's first writing credit, and White's third directing credit.

=== Writing ===
Regarding the use of puppets to tell Dot's story, the medium also allowed for Hawley and Shih to present viewers with the harsh realities of Dot's past life without making viewers want to turn away from their screens. Shih said, "We wanted to find a way to tackle this subject that is obviously dark, but do it in a way that is accessible so that people can receive it without being completely traumatized. There was an evolution of how it [ended up becoming] marionettes, but we also wanted to come up with a way to externalize Dot's internal journey, the healing work she has to do to confront her abusive ex."

When adding hints to the diner scene which later became elements of Dot's dream, Shih says, “I think we erred on the side of putting in too much and probably shot a lot more than we needed to. Some things were probably cut out because it’s a fine balance. We want the audience to be able to, by the end of the episode, be like, ‘Oh yeah, it was a dream, and that makes sense.’ But we didn’t want them to feel it on the first watch.”

== Reception ==
=== Viewers ===
In its original American broadcast, "Linda" was seen by an estimated 0.576 million household viewers and gained a 0.08 ratings share among adults aged 18–49, according to Nielsen Media Research. This means that 0.08 percent of all households with televisions watched the episode. This was a 14% increase in viewership from the previous episode, which was watched by 0.457 million viewers with a 0.07 in the 18-49 demographics.

=== Critical reviews ===
"Linda" received extremely positive reviews from critics. Tom Philip of The A.V. Club gave the episode an "A–" grade and wrote, "Rewatching the episode, the clues are everywhere. But such a rote, cynical twist feels like the point here. Camp Utopia was just that, and whether there's a real log cabin in the woods somewhere housing dozens of Lindas is beside the point. Dot's finally been able to tell her story and finally equipped herself to receive it. That's surely victory enough? No."

Alan Sepinwall wrote, "On the one hand, it's a powerful and deliberately odd look at the psychological wounds from abuse that linger long after the physical injuries have healed, and it's probably Juno Temple's best showcase of the season so far. On the other, the episode's conclusion seems to reveal that the entire thing was a daydream Dot had while sitting at a roadside diner. And I believe that the bar has to be very high to justify an episode going, 'It was all a dream!' The emotional catharsis was still real in Dot's head, but it doesn't appear that she ever saw Linda, much less convinced her to speak to the authorities with her. So I didn't love that." Keith Phipps of Vulture gave the episode a 4 star rating out of 5 and wrote, "After a string of action- and incident-packed episodes, 'Linda' slows down the pace while raising the stakes."

Scott Tobias of The New York Times wrote, "Now in the homestretch of the new season, Hawley returns to Oz again with an extended fantasy sequence that addresses Dot's back story more deftly than a standard monologue or flashback ever could. It's also a subtler homage than running a tornado through Kansas in black-and-white." Sean T. Collins of Decider wrote, "The Coen Brothers can be unsparing as hell when they want to, and there are cases throughout their filmography where people who deserve to live don't. That's been mostly, though not entirely, untrue of Hawley's version of things. I suppose both we and Dot are going to find out soon enough."
