= George Sprod =

Australian cartoonist

George Napier Sprod (16 September 1919 – April 2003) was an Australian cartoonist, for many years active in England, who signed his work "Sprod".

== History ==
George was born in Adelaide to Thomas Napier Sprod (4 February 1884 – 9 August 1942) and his wife Isabelle Kathleen (née Knight) (7 April 1888 – 10 April 1991), members of the Cudmore family, prominent in Adelaide society. As a youth he and his sister Kathleen were frequent and respected contributors of poems and drawings to the Register News-Pictorial's "Sunbeams" pages and its successor, the Sunday Mail's "Sunshine Club". He attended Norwood High School then Urrbrae Agricultural High School, as his parents had expected him to embark on a life of agriculture, but he showed little aptitude for the profession. He attended Art School but may not have completed a year, as by 1939 he was in Sydney, having left home on a bicycle, which he abandoned at Hay to complete the journey by rail. Apart from sales of a few cartoons to Smith's Weekly, he did not achieve his artistic ambitions, failed as a photographer and was sacked after a week's work at the De La Salle Brothers school (perhaps De La Salle College Ashfield), so he enlisted in the AIF as a gunner (giving his year of birth as 1918) with 2/15 Field Regiment, and sent overseas.

He was one of the many captured by the Japanese in the fall of Malaya and spent the years 1942 to 1945 as a POW, conscripted to work on the Thai-Burma Railway and in Changi Prison, where he developed his artistic talents. A fellow prisoner was the great British cartoonist Ronald Searle; they, and others, contributed to a fortnightly camp magazine The Exile.

After the war he returned to Sydney, where he sold illustrated articles on his experiences to the Australian press, first to the Fairfax Sydney Morning Herald, then to Frank Packer's Australian Women's Weekly. where he secured a position, contributing occasionally to its companion The Daily Telegraph. In 1949 he left for London, where he had work published by various magazines including the News Chronicle, but most importantly for Punch and was praised by Malcolm Muggeridge For twenty years he was one of that magazine's most published artists. He left London around 1969 and returned to Sydney, settling in Sydney's Kings Cross, which at the time had a thriving community of artists.

== Family ==
While in London he married Francine Humphries (née Dessant) on 22 July 1961. A son, Douglas Peter Sprod was born in 1962 (and lives in England); the couple separated sometime before 1968; she died in March 1982.

George was survived by his sister Kathleen Carter and brothers John and Dan. David Sprod, a nephew, inherited and is the custodian of George Sprod's extensive personal collection of his own work and memorabilia.

== Publications ==
- Chips Off a Shoulder Heinemann, Australia 1956
- Bamboo Round My Shoulder – Changi: The lighter side (1981) ISBN 0949924024
- When I Survey the Wondorus Cross (1989) ISBN 073165661X
- Sprod's Views of Sydney (1981) ISBN 0949924091
- Life on a Square-Wheeled Bike: The Saga of a Cartoonist (1983) ISBN 0949924628

=== as illustrator ===
- Backroom Joys by Justin Richardson
- As I Seem To Remember by Sir Leonard Woolley
- The Tale of the Tub. A survey of bathing through the ages by Geoffrey Ashe
- From the Somme to Singapore – a Medical Officer in Two World Wars by Charles Huxtable ISBN 0864177453
- The New Fitness Leader's Handbook by Gary Egger and Nigel Champion ISBN 0864170629
- Learn to Talk Old Jack Lang : A Handbook of Australian Rhyming Slang by John Meredith ISBN 0864170033
- Growing Up in the Forties by Unice Atwell ISBN 0949924504
- Home for Christmas But Five Years Late by Bob Mutton (ed.) (1995)
- Vintage Years – Giftbook for Grandparents and the over 60's by Ern Burrows ISBN 0864171757
- An Explosion of Limericks with Explanatory Drawings by Sprod by Vyvyan Holland
- That odd Mr Sprod : cartoons by George Napier Sprod by Dan Sprod, Pub. 2009 by Richard Sprod, Piccadilly, South Australia ISBN 9780646518701

== Sources ==
- Bryant, Mark "OBITUARY: George Sprod; Writer and Illustrator Best Known for His 'Punch' Cartoons", The Independent, London, 16 April 2003
