= Kristin Rudrüd =

American actress

- Occupation: Actress

Kristin Rudrüd is an American film, theater, and television actress.

== Life and career ==
Rudrüd was raised in Moorhead, Minnesota. Following graduation from high school in 1973, she attended Minnesota State University. After studying acting in London, she went to New York City where she found success in theater, landing a part in Amadeus and performing a public theater reading of Othello, which starred Al Pacino.

After she returned to Fargo, she began her career as a film actress. In 1996, Rudrüd starred as William H. Macy's doomed wife Jean Lundegaard in Joel and Ethan Coen's black comedy film Fargo. She had a small role in the 1999 comedy Pleasantville, also starring Macy; in a short film Wheels Locked, which received a "Best of the Fest" at the Rochester International Film Festival and as an actress in Drop Dead Gorgeous, and in the short film A Psychic Mom.

Rudrüd appeared in television roles on Chicago Hope, and All My Children. In the 2023 Fargo episode "Linda", the seventh episode of its fifth season, set in the same world as the 1996 film, Rudrüd is seen in a photograph as Jean Lundegaard, appearing within Dot Lyon's dreamscape of the afterlife "Camp Utopia".

== Personal life ==
Rudrüd is married and has a daughter, and she still makes her home in Fargo.

== Selected filmography ==
- A Psychic Mom (1993) – Judy Banning
- Fargo (1996) – Jean Lundegaard
- Pleasantville (1998) – Mary
- Frog and Wombat (1998) – Mrs. Reverend Walker
- Drop Dead Gorgeous (1999) – Connie Rudrüd, the Pork Products Lady
- Herman U.S.A. (2001) – Gloria Swanson
- Fargo Season 5, Episode 7: "Linda" (2023) – Jean Lundegaard (photograph)
