= Kings Cross, New South Wales =

Kings Cross
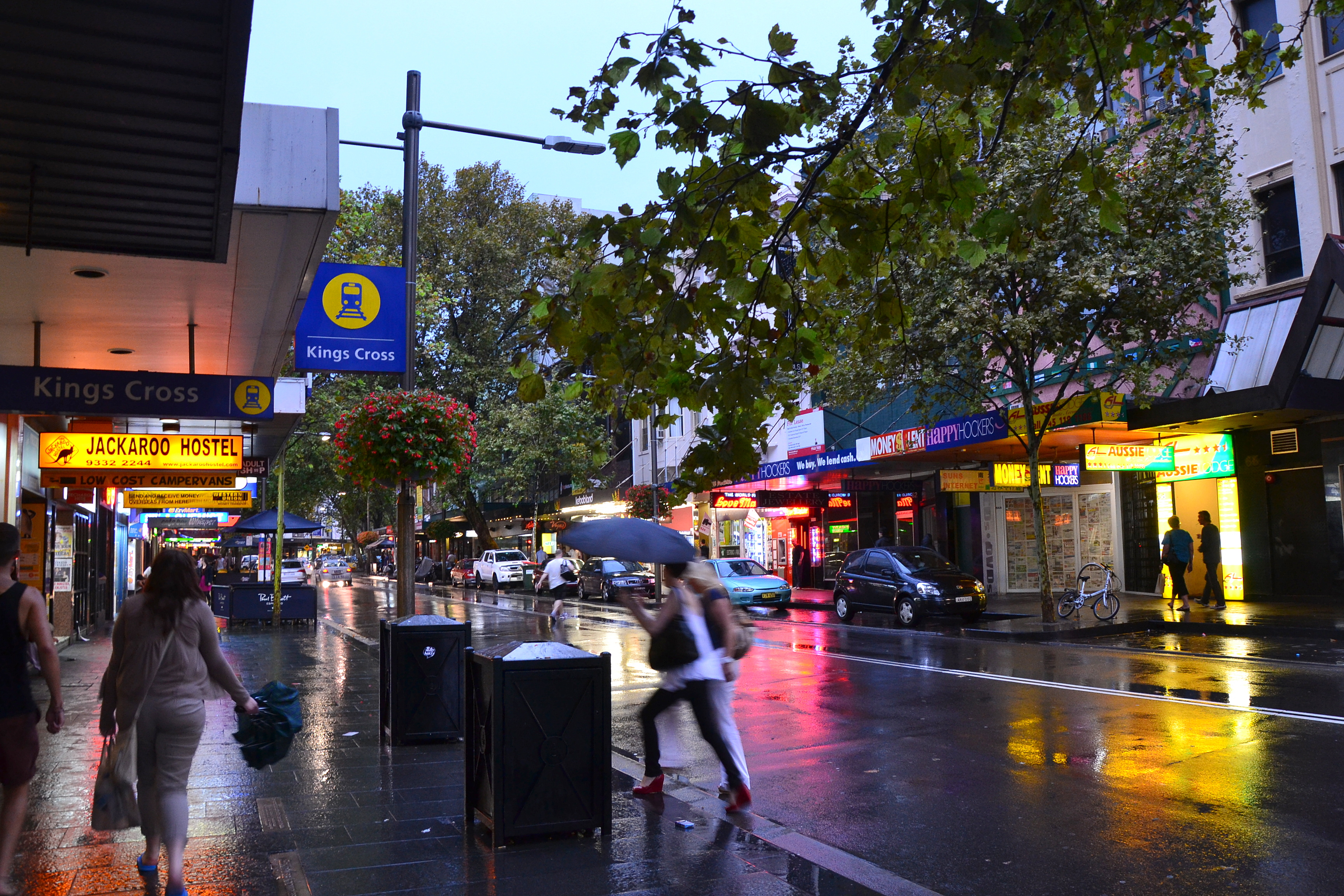
- Darlinghurst Road, Kings Cross, 2012
- Coordinates: 33°52′25″S 151°13′25″E
- Country: Australia
- State: New South Wales
- City: Sydney
- LGA: City of Sydney
- Location: 2 km (1.2 mi) east of Sydney CBD

Government
  - State electorate: Sydney
  - Federal division: Wentworth

Population
  - Total: 4,948 (2019)
Localities around Kings Cross
Potts Point	Potts Point	Elizabeth Bay
Woolloomooloo	Kings Cross	Rushcutters Bay
Darlinghurst	Darlinghurst	Darlinghurst

Kings Cross is an inner-eastern locality of Sydney, New South Wales, Australia that sits within the suburb of Potts Point. It is located approximately 2 kilometres east of the Sydney central business district, in the local government area of the City of Sydney and is bounded by Elizabeth Bay and Rushcutters Bay to the east and Darlinghurst to the south.

Colloquially known as The Cross, the area was once known for its music halls and grand theatres. It was rapidly transformed after World War II by the influx of troops returning and visiting from the nearby Garden Island naval base. It became known as Sydney's night entertainment and red-light district, earning the nickname "Sin City"; however, many nightclubs, bars and adult entertainment venues closed due to the Sydney lockout laws. Today, it is a mixed locality offering services such as a railway station, gyms, supermarkets and bakeries as well as entertainment venues including bars, restaurants, nightclubs, brothels and strip clubs.

== History ==
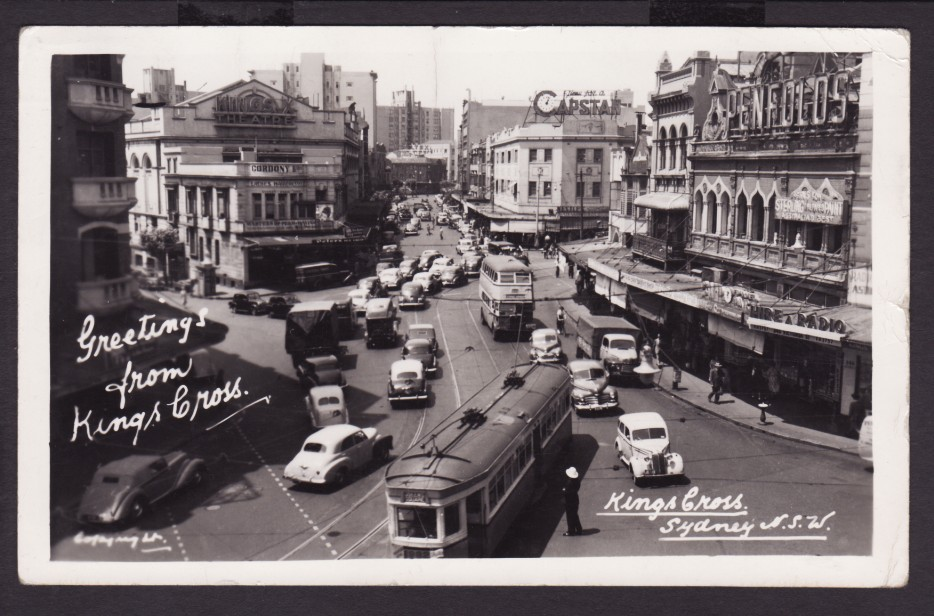
Trams and trolley buses pass through Kings Cross intersection in the 1950s

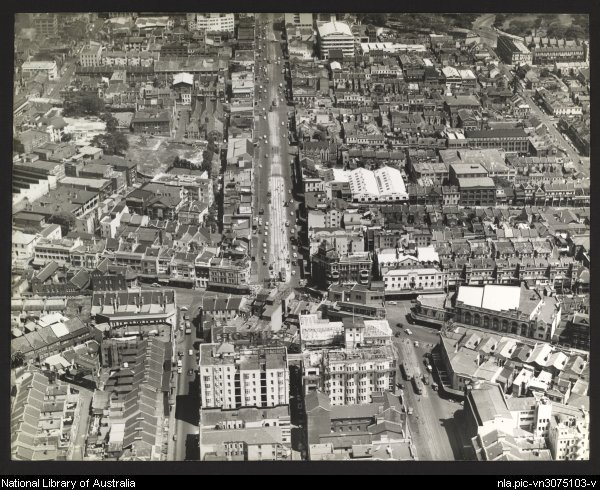
William Street and Kings Cross from the air in the 1950s

=== British settlement ===
The intersection of William Street, Darlinghurst Road and Victoria Street at the locality's southernmost limit was named Queen's Cross to celebrate Queen Victoria's diamond jubilee in 1897. Confusion with Queen's Square in King Street in the city prompted its renaming as Kings Cross, after King Edward VII, in 1905.

During the early 19th century, the Darlinghurst area, which extended to include current-day Kings Cross, was one of Sydney's most prestigious locations, being far enough to escape the noise and smell of the central city but close enough for easy travel. An additional attraction was the commanding harbour views to the east and north and (from some points) views to the west as far as the Blue Mountains.

In 1828, the Governor of New South Wales Sir Ralph Darling subdivided the area, then known as Woolloomooloo Hill, into large allotments which he granted seventeen estates to favoured subordinates and leading businessmen. They built a series of grandiose mansions with sprawling gardens of up to ten acres (4.0 hectares). The remnants of these gardens helped give the area its leafy character, and many of the mansions are commemorated through street names such as Roslyn (for Roslyn Hall), Orwell (for Orwell House) and Kellett (for Kellett House). Most of the grand estates were ultimately subdivided with all but a handful of the great houses demolished. One of the surviving homes, located nearby in the suburb of Elizabeth Bay, is Elizabeth Bay House, a quintessential example of Australian colonial architecture. Others, now used for other purposes, include Tusculum on Manning Street and Rockwall on Rockwall Crescent. A prominent past resident of this era was David Scott Mitchell.

=== Early subdivision plans ===
The estates that Governor Darling granted to the emerging merchant class and professional elite shaped the development of the area that came to be known as Kings Cross. The mansions built on these estates such as Tusculum remain today as leading examples of architectural design in colonial Australia.

Subdivision plans also known as estate maps were produced from the mid-19th to mid-20th century and advertised estates and subdivisions of land for sale. They illustrate the urban development of Sydney as large estates were divided up and transformed into the suburbs of Sydney.

The estates and mansions are commemorated through street names such as Roslyn (for Roslyn Hall), Orwell (for Orwell House) and Kellett (for Kellett House), as documented in the gallery of subdivision maps.

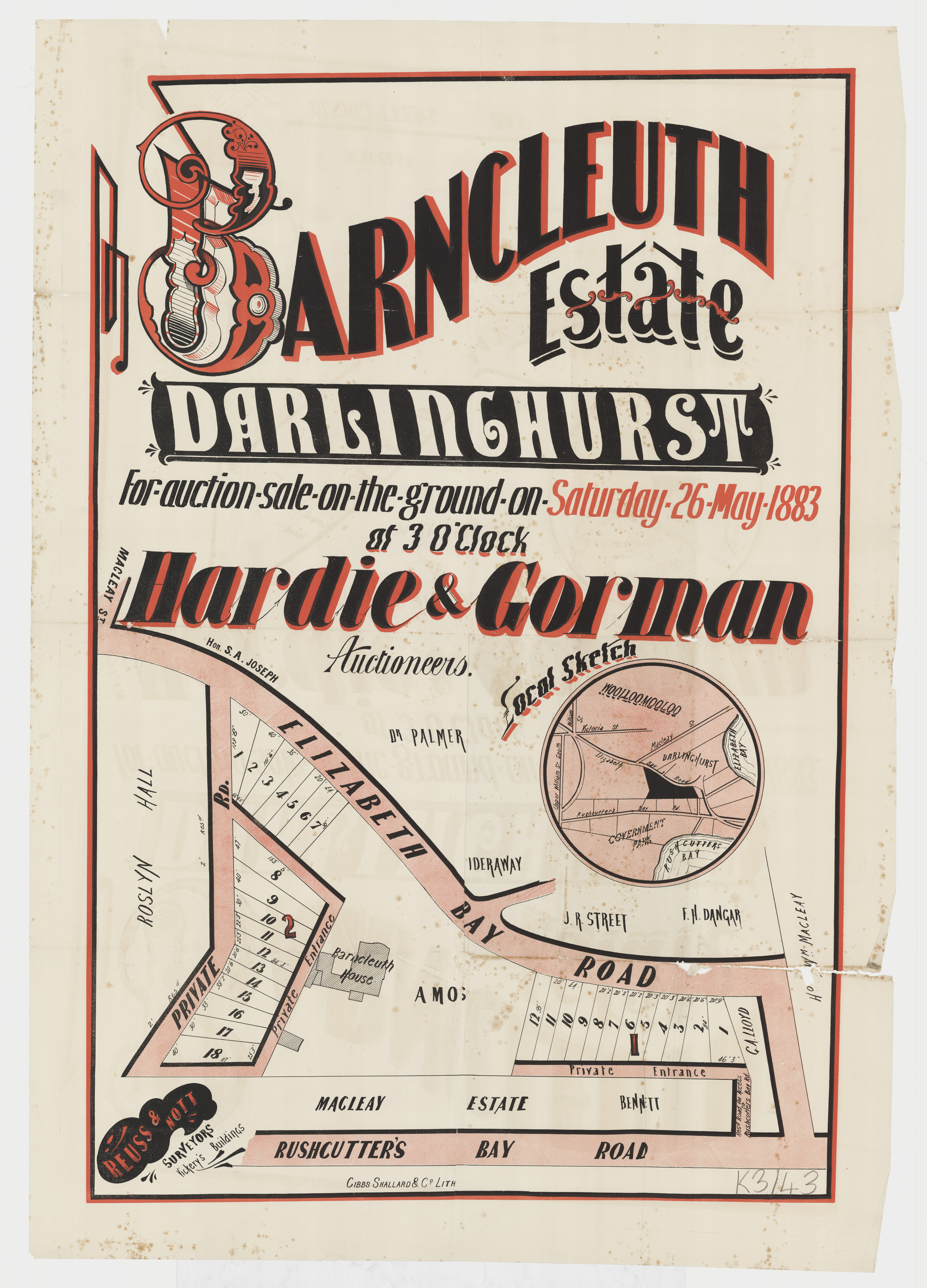
Barncleuth Estate, Darlinghurst – Hardie and Gorman – Elizabeth Bay Rd, Rushcutter's Bay Rd, 1883.

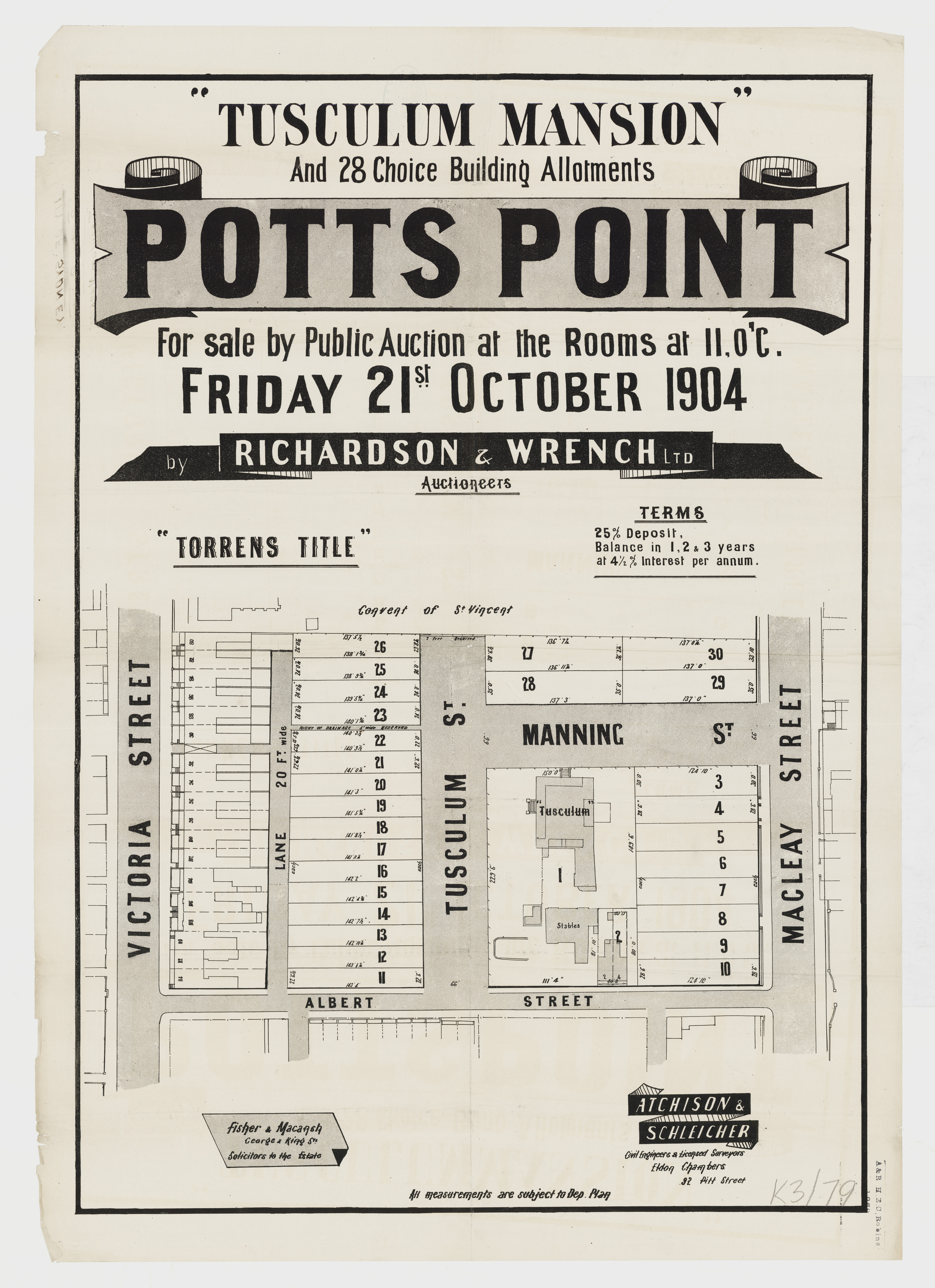
Tusculum, Potts Point – Richardson & Wrench – Victoria St, Tusculum St, Macleay St, Albert St, Manning St, 1904.

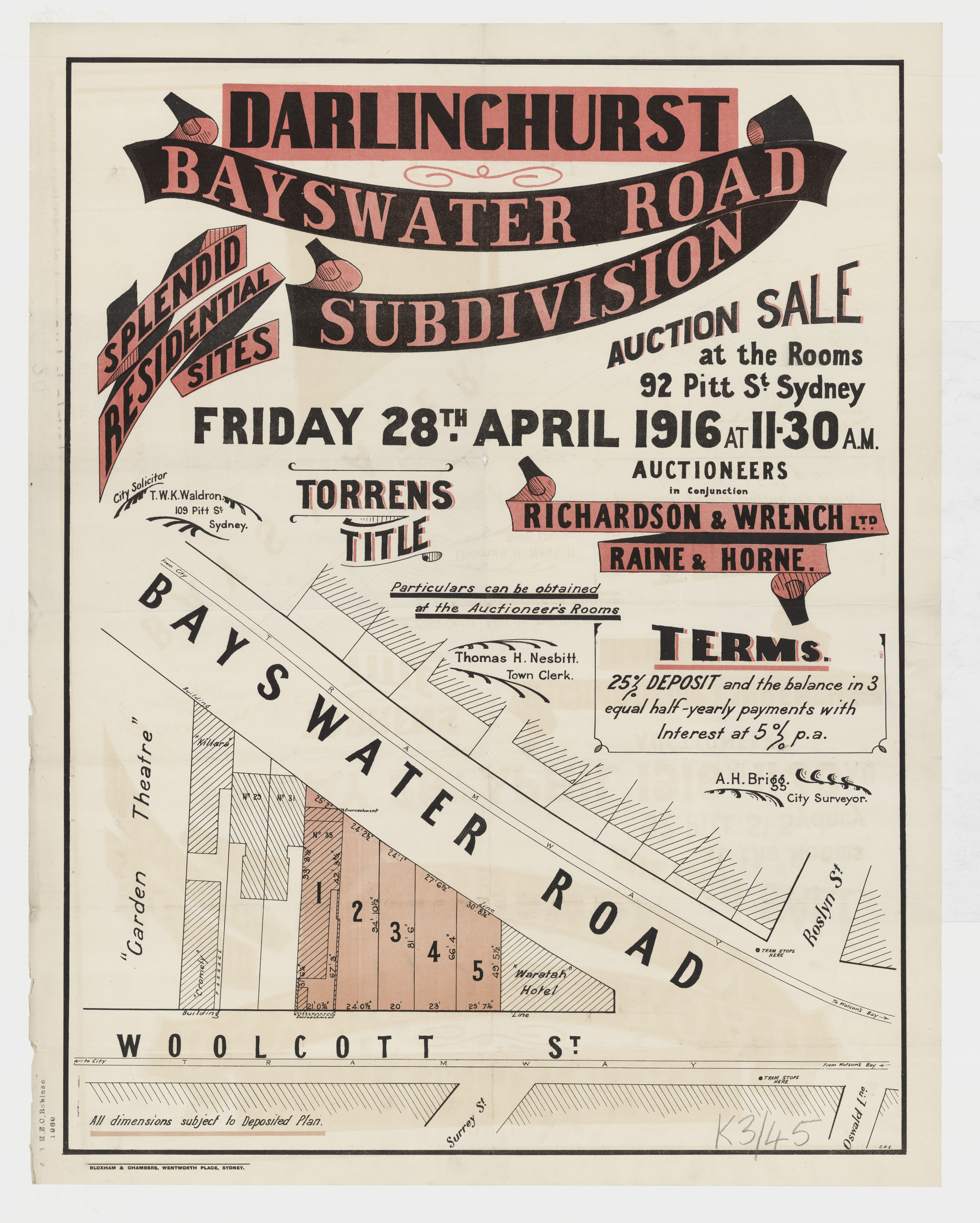
Darlinghurst, Bayswater Rd subdivision – Richardson and Wrench; Raine and Horne – Bayswater Rd, Woolcott St, Surrey St, Roslyn St, 1916

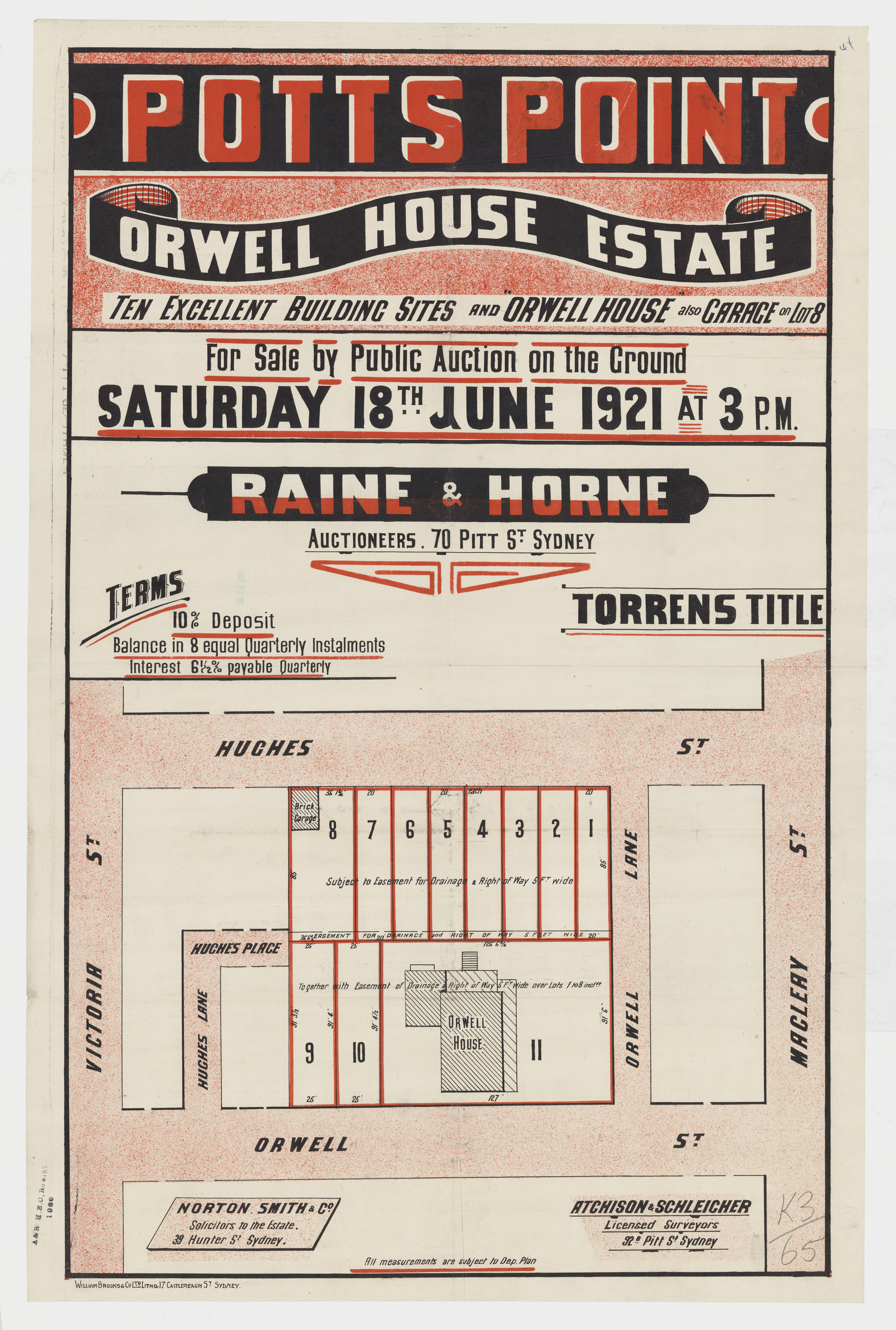
Potts Point, Orwell House Estate – Raine and Horne – Hughes St, Victoria St, Orwell St, Macleay St, Orwell Lane, Hughes Lane, Hughes Place, 1921.

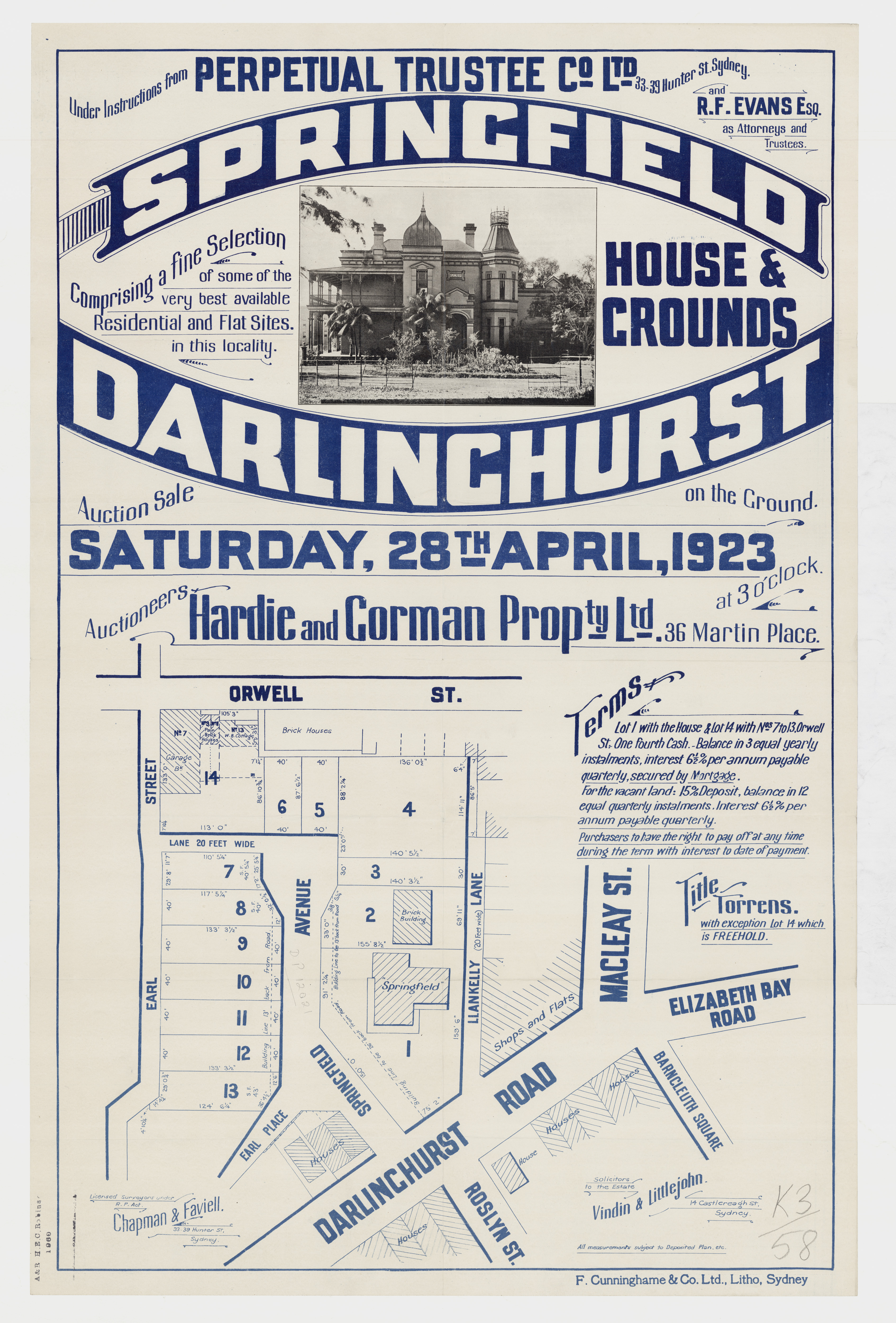
Springfield House and grounds, Darlinghurst – Hardie and Gorman – Earl St, Earl Place, Springfield Ave, Llankelly Lane, Orwell St, Elizabeth Bay Rd, Barncleuth Square, Roslyn St, Macleay St, Darlinghurst Rd, 1923.

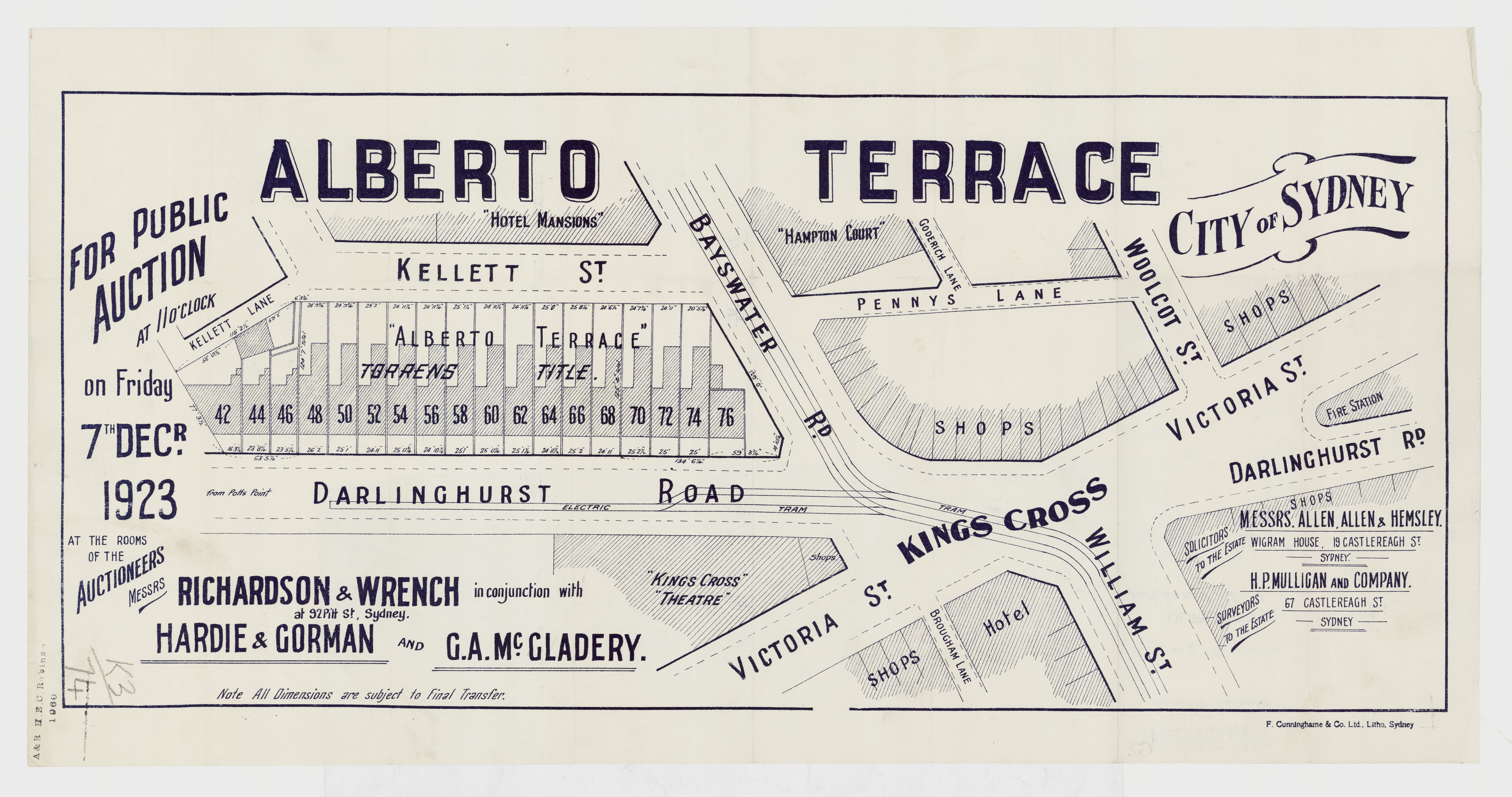
Alberto Terrace – Richardson and Wrench, Hardie and Gorman – Kellett Lane, Kellet St, Darlinghurst Rd, Bayswater Rd, Victoria St, William St, Woolcot St, Brougham Lane, Penny's Lane, Goderich Lane, 1923.

=== Bohemian district ===
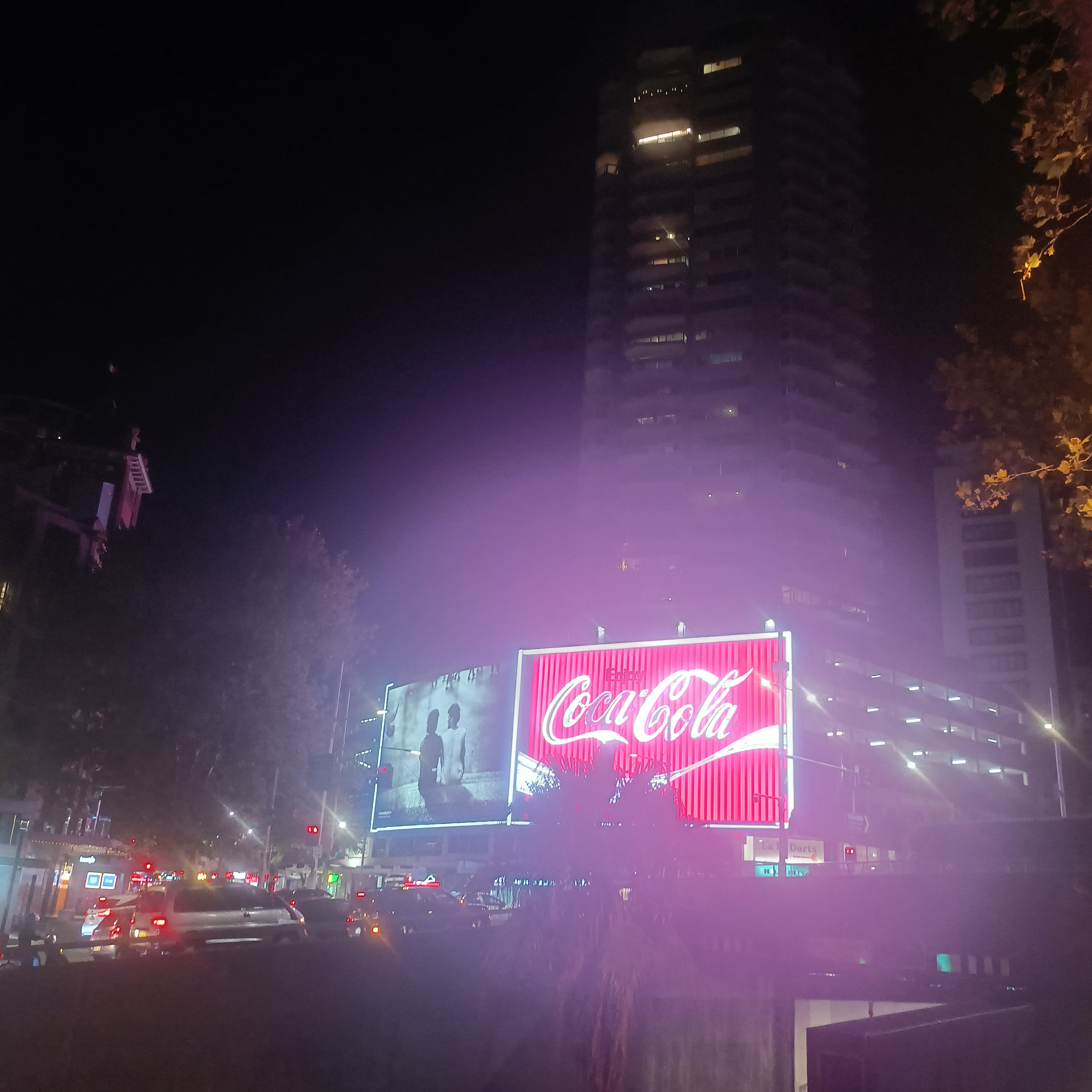
The Coca-Cola billboard on the corner of William street and Darlinghurst road was first installed in 1974 and in 2015 the original neon sign was removed. In 2016 the new sign was turned on and it uses a lot less power by making use of LED tubing. 2026.

The Kings Cross district was Sydney's bohemian heartland from the early decades of the 20th century. The illegal trading of alcohol, known as sly grog, was notorious in the area up until mid-century, led by rival brothel owners, Tilly Devine and Kate Leigh. For most of the 1900s, the "Cross" was an entertainment centre which hosted numerous clubs and cafes as well as the Kings Cross Theatre, one of Sydney's earliest movie houses. The area was also home to a large number of artists, including writers, poets and journalists such as Kenneth Slessor, Christopher Brennan, Hal Porter, George Sprod and Dame Mary Gilmore, entrepreneur Mayfield B. Anthony, actors including Peter Finch and Chips Rafferty, and painters Sir William Dobell and Rosaleen Norton.

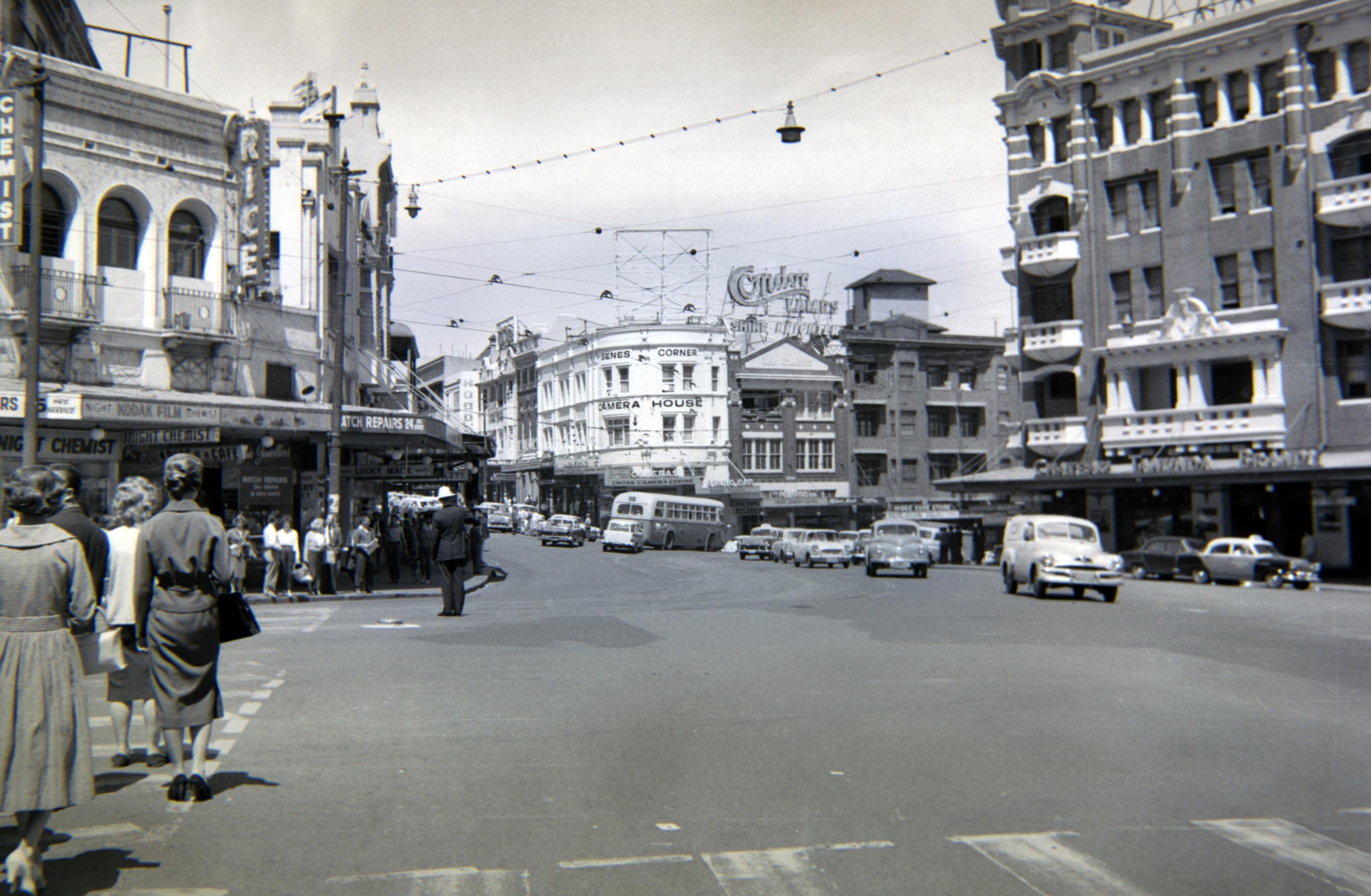
Kings Cross circa 1960.

From the 1960s onwards, Kings Cross also came to serve as both the city's main tourist accommodation and entertainment mecca, as well as its red-light district. It thereby achieved a high level of notoriety out of all proportion to its limited geographical extent. Hundreds of American servicemen on R & R (rest and recreation) leave flocked to the area each week in search of entertainment. Organised crime and police corruption were well entrenched in the area – one of Sydney's most notorious illegal casinos operated with impunity for many years, although it was known to all and located only yards from Darlinghurst police station. Much of this activity can be related with Abe Saffron, commonly known as Mr Sin or "the boss of the Cross".

Two serial arsonists, Reginald Little and Gregory Brown collectively killed 21 people in the Savoy (1975) and Downunder (1989) hotels on Darlinghurst Road. Although the owner of the Downunder, Abe Saffron, was accused of burning the hotel for insurance purposes there is no evidence this was true.

A positive influence in the area during that time was the Wayside Chapel, run by Rev Ted Noffs. His church was open most of the time, providing a "drop-in centre" and counselling services to many of the itinerants who were drawn to the area. The Ted Noffs Foundation Inc., established in 1971, continues his work supporting young people and their families who are experiencing drug and alcohol problems and related trauma.

Juanita Nielsen, a journalist and publisher, campaigned against property development in the Kings Cross area during the 1970s until her sudden disappearance on 4 July 1975. A coronial inquest determined that Nielsen had been murdered; and, although the case has never been officially solved, it is widely believed that Nielsen was killed by agents of the developers. Some of the projects she campaigned against were delayed, halted or modified due to a combination of community campaigns and green bans placed by the NSW Builders Labourers Federation.

As a celebration to commemorate the Stonewall riots, the inaugural Sydney Gay and Lesbian Mardi Gras pro-gay rights protest march was held on the evening of 24 June 1978. After the protest march, participants were subject to police harassment in Hyde Park, following the revocation of the original protest permit. Some participants headed to Kings Cross where police arrested 53 people, although most of the charges were later dropped.

Australia's first widely known transgender person, Carlotta, rose to prominence in Kings Cross whilst working in cabaret at Les Girls, The Tender Trap, and her appearance on soap opera Number 96.

From the late 1960s, drug-related crime was one of the area's main social problems. In 2001, despite controversy, Australia's first Medically Supervised Injecting Centre (MSIC) was established (where users of illegal drugs can inject themselves at a safe injection site in clean conditions) at a shopfront site in Kings Cross. The injecting room is credited with reducing the occurrence of fatal overdoses in the injecting drug-user community, as well as reducing the number of needles left in the street, with an interim evaluation report in 2007 claiming:

The reduction in opioid-related overdoses was much more substantial in the immediate vicinity of the MSIC than in other neighbouring areas. ... Counts of discarded needles and syringes collected locally indicated a decrease of around 50% following the establishment of the service.

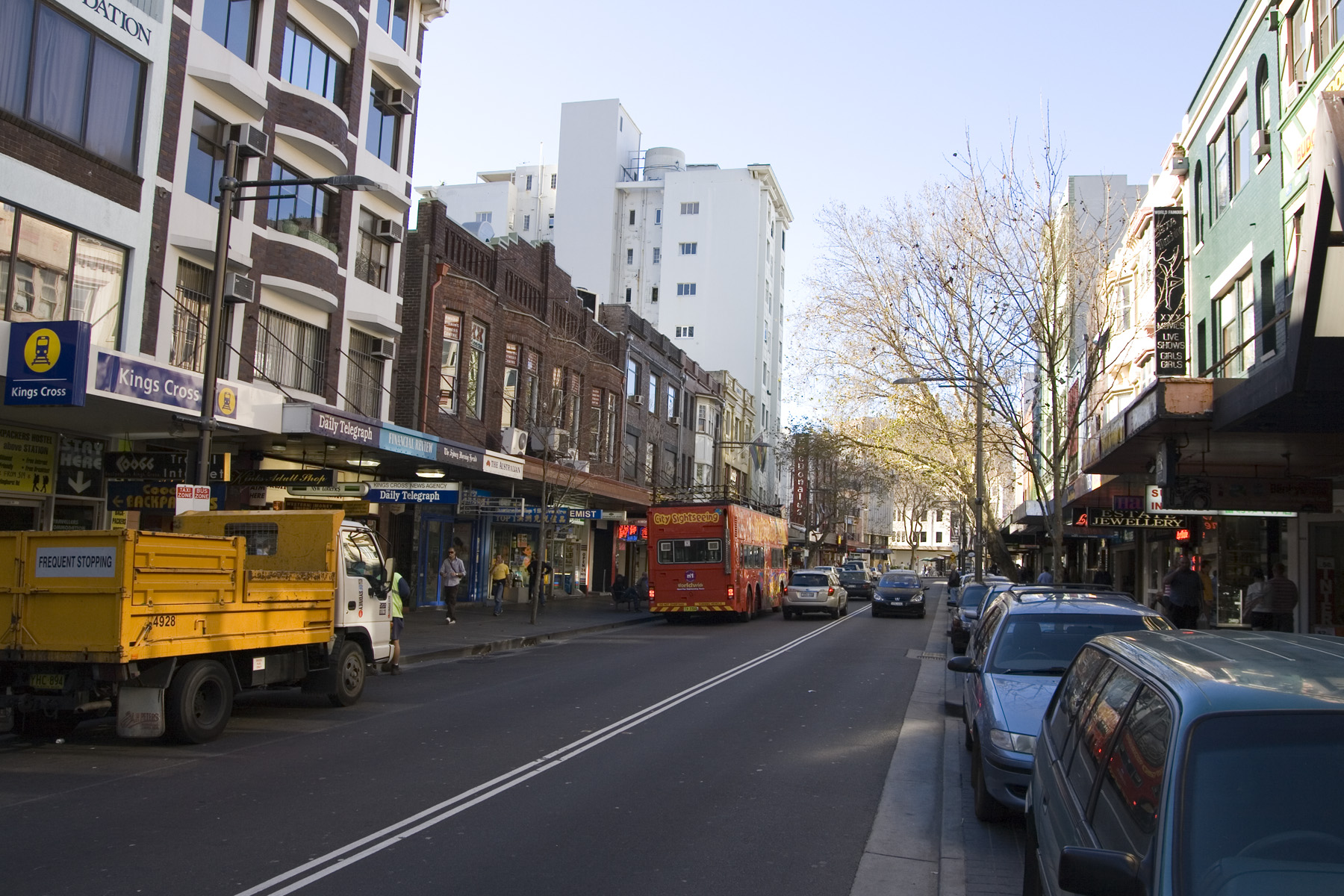
Darlinghurst road with Kings Cross station on the left. 2007

=== Today ===
Today, the ongoing operation of tourist accommodation, the proximity to social housing and health care, and the convenient public transport to the city result in a diverse population, both resident and passing through at Kings Cross. Since the introduction of controversial lockout laws in March 2014 several nightclubs and pubs in the area have closed down.

In February 2021, the NSW government announced the end of lockout laws in March 2021 hoping to revitalise the area.

== Heritage listings ==
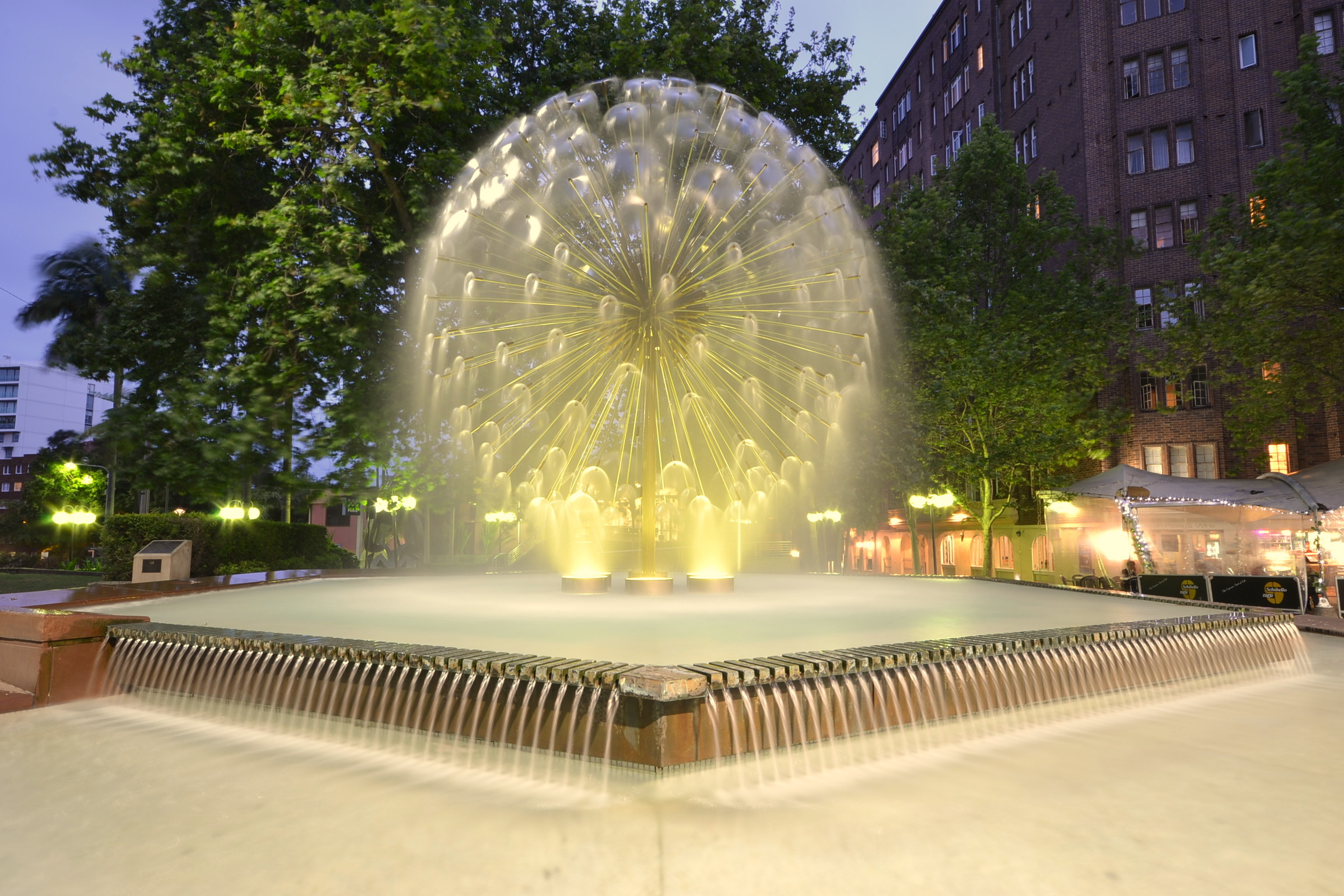
El Alamein Fountain 2011.

Kings Cross has a number of heritage-listed sites, including:

- Macleay Street: El Alamein Memorial Fountain.
- Darlinghurst Road: Bourbon & Beefsteak building façade, Kingsley Hall building, and the Empire Hotel.

== Landmarks ==
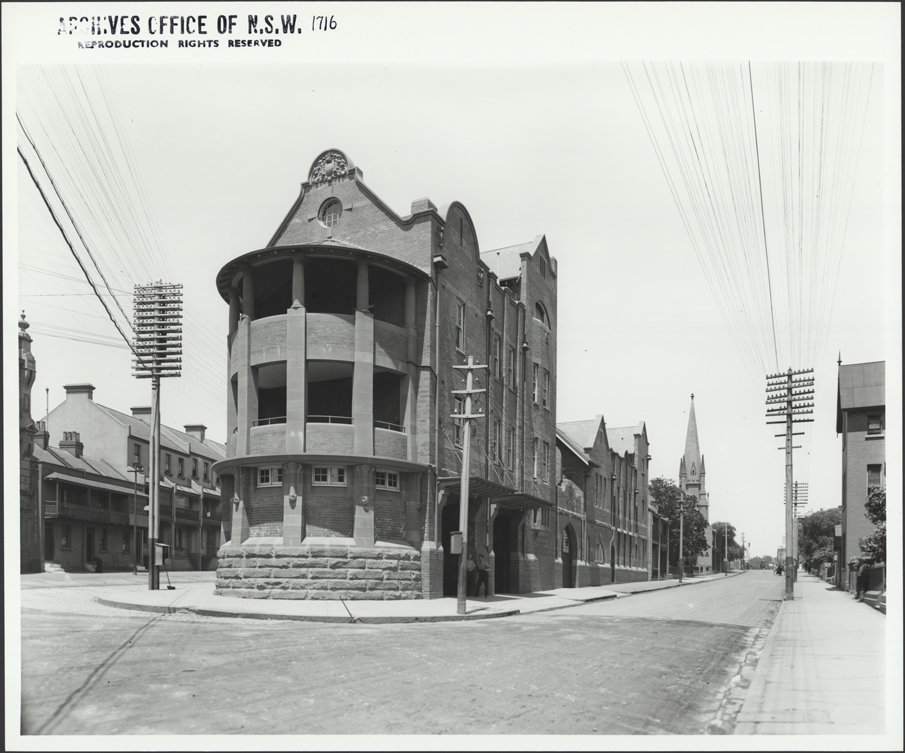
Fire Station & Kirketon Road Centre, Darlinghurst Road, 1912

- The El Alamein Fountain is at the entrance to the Fitzroy Gardens on the corner of Darlingurst Road and Macleay Street was commissioned as a memorial to soldiers who died in 1942 during World War II in two battles at El Alamein, Egypt. It was designed in 1961 by the New Zealand-born architect Robert Woodward. Its dandelion design, which has since been copied for fountains around the world, was Woodward's original design. From 2008 to 2015 the Gardens were focus of a prolonged struggle between local residents and the City of Sydney Council over the latter's plans to redevelop the space.
- The Coca-Cola billboard, which has since been turned off and replaced in 2016 with a new sign. Pieces of the original sign were auctioned off on eBay with proceeds going to the Wayside Chapel.
- The Fire Station at the intersection of Darlinghurst Road and Victoria Street was designed by the Government Architect, Walter Liberty Vernon, and built from 1910 to 1912. It is an example of the Federation Free Style and is now listed on the Register of the National Estate.
- Kings Cross railway station is an underground railway station on the Eastern Suburbs & Illawarra Line of the Sydney Trains network.
- The Les Girls building, now known as the Empire Hotel, stood prominently on the corner of Darlinghurst Road and Roslyn Street, in the heart of the Cross. From 1963 until 1993 the building was home to the legendary Les Girls "drag queen" show, starring Carlotta. Throughout the 1990s the building, still retaining its original 1960s features, became the home to alternative cabaret, including the much-loved Sunday nightclub The Tender Trap.

== Culture ==
Events and celebrations

- The Kings Cross Food and Wine Festival is a local annual event held in autumn by the Potts Point Partnership, a business action group.

Popular culture

- The television series Kings Cross ER: St Vincent's Hospital prominently features medical emergencies that occur in Kings Cross and surrounding areas. The show frequently examines issues in Kings Cross such as violence, homelessness, prostitution, illicit drugs and gang-related incidents. The title was inaccurate as St. Vincent's Hospital is located in Darlinghurst.
- Kings Cross has made several appearances in popular Australian culture including Paul Kelly's song "From St Kilda to Kings Cross" from the album Post.
- The 1999 Australian crime film Two Hands starring actor Heath Ledger was partly filmed in Kings Cross.
- Clare Werbeloff became known as the Kings Cross Bogan following her eyewitness account of a shooting outside a Kings Cross nightclub, which turned out to be a hoax. Her politically incorrect report to a television news cameraman spread online via YouTube and made her an internet celebrity. Afterwards she starred in a lingerie photo shoot for Ralph magazine and in several Australian television shows. She also starred in a photo shoot in a 2011 Spanish FHM magazine.
- The novel The Golden Day by Ursula Dubosarsky is set in a fictitious girls' school in Kings Cross and involves the disappearance of one of the teachers while on a school excursion in 1967.
- The novel Down in the City (1957) by Elizabeth Harrower is mostly set in Kings Cross.
- Justine Ettler's The River Ophelia, a controversial 1995 novel, is believed to be set in King's Cross though the location is never revealed in the book.
- The 1988 Australian film Tender Hooks is largely set in Kings Cross.
- Australian crime drama series Underbelly: The Golden Mile was set in Kings Cross. It was a dramatic representation of Kings Cross organised crime in the 1980s and 1990s.
- The Australian television series Love Child was set in Kings Cross. It is a fictional drama series based on the lives of teenagers going through underage pregnancy during the 1960s.
- The Australian television series Les Norton was set in Kings Cross, as the lead character is a bouncer in a Kings Cross illegal gambling casino in 1985.
- Australian television series Last King of the Cross is set in Kings Cross during the early years of John Ibrahim's rise in Kings Cross and Oxford Street.
- A documentary titled The Rise & Fall Of Kings Cross will air on Seven Network in 2025.

== Population ==
As of 2019, it is estimated 4,948 people live within the locality's 0.17 km^{2} (0.066 sq mi) area. In 2018, the local area (including Potts Point and Woolloomooloo) was recognised as the second most densely populated in Australia.

== See also ==
- Uniting Medically Supervised Injecting Centre (a state government-supported facility in Kings Cross, New South Wales)
- 1973 Kings Cross strippers' strike
