= Coca-Cola billboard =

Advertising billboard in Sydney

Coordinates: 33°52′30.93″S 151°13′20.04″E

The Coca-Cola billboard was first installed in 1974 and in 2015 the original neon sign was removed. In 2016 the new sign was turned on and it uses a lot less power by making use of LED tubing. Photo taken in 2007.

The Coca-Cola Billboard in Kings Cross, Sydney, is an advertising billboard erected in 1974 by Coca-Cola. It is more often regarded as an iconic landmark than as an advertisement and is considered to be the premier billboard in Sydney and is the second largest billboard in the Southern Hemisphere next to the Glebe Island silos billboard.

== The sign ==
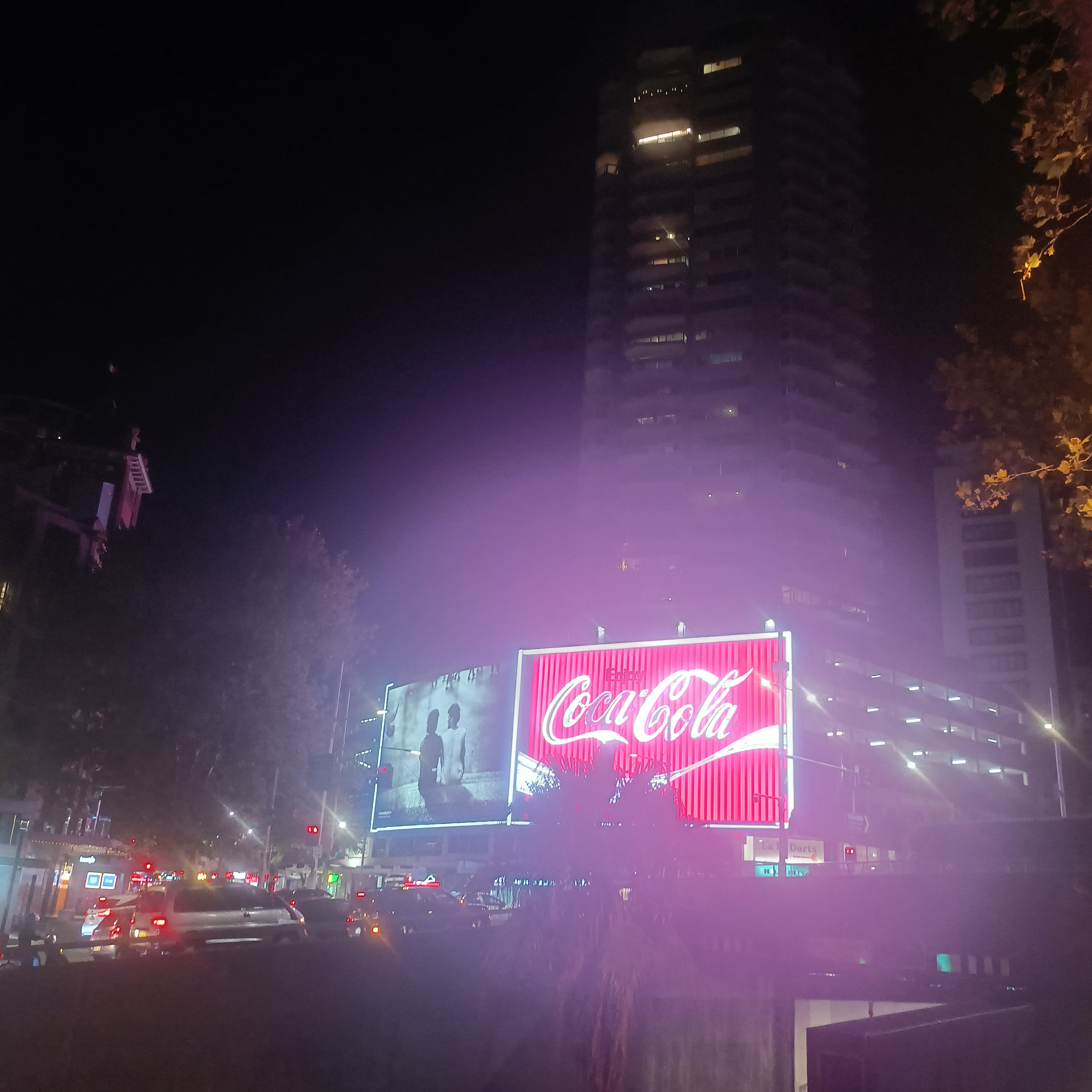
The Coca-Cola billboard on the corner of William street and Darlinghurst road, Kings Cross, Sydney. 2026.

The Coca-Cola sign is located above the intersection of William Street and Darlinghurst Road and is attached to the Zenith Residences, formerly the Millenium Hotel and Kingsgate Hotel. The sign is often referred to as The Gateway to the Cross, because it is prominently visible from all of William Street, which is the principal road leading to Kings Cross from the Sydney CBD. One also must pass directly in front of the sign when entering Kings Cross from either William Street or Darlinghurst Road, the two main access roads. The sign is often thought to be heritage listed which it is not.

The billboard is made up of two parts: on the right, the famous red and white neon sign, and on the left the more modern, flex-faced sign. In total the sign is 41 metres in length and 13 metres in height, with the right sign being slightly larger at 21 metres in length. The red and white neon sign is made up of eighty-eight vertical bars of red tubing. It also has 800 fluorescent lamps that are concealed behind reflectors that allow the billboard to project thirteen different patterns. The left part of the billboard is a flex-face style sign and is internally illuminated by approximately 1,000 fluorescent lamps.

== History ==
In 2008 activists covered the billboard in protest of Chinese policies towards Tibet

The red and white neon billboard was erected in 1974 in its current location whilst the left side of the billboard was a later addition in 1990. In 2004 the billboard for the first time in thirty years advertised a product other than Coca-Cola, when the left side of the board advertised the release of Halo 2.

On 31 March 2007 the lights on the billboard were intentionally switched off for the first time, in correlation with the inaugural Earth Hour.

On 23 April 2008, four activists unfurled a banner over the billboard in protest of Coke's sponsorship of the Olympic torch relay at Kings Cross. The banner read: "Enjoy Compassion. Always Tibet. CHINA – TALK TO THE DALAI LAMA". All four activists were arrested.

In 2015, the original sign was removed to make way for an upgraded sign that is made up of LED tubing that uses a lot less power and the new Coca-Cola sign was officially turned on, on the 15 September 2016. The lettering was auctioned off, raising $100,700 for the Wayside Chapel, but the hyphen between the words was given away via a Facebook contest, and now resides in Lithgow, as part of a Christmas light display. It is the single largest controllable LED sign in the Southern Hemisphere and can change colour. In 2025 the sign was refreshed.
