= The Tender Trap (club) =

Cabaret nightclub in Sydney, Australia (1994–2000)

Coordinates: 33.8734°S 151.2244°E

The Tender Trap was a cabaret nightclub that ran in Sydney, Australia from December 1994 to January 2000. It was one of the most successful Sydney clubs of the 1990s. The Tender Trap club pre-dated the mid-90s lounge culture phenomenon, but as the phenomenon grew, so too did the popularity of the club.

== Background ==
The Tender Trap operated on Sunday nights, in the theatre-restaurant room of the legendary Les Girls building in Sydney's infamous Kings Cross, New South Wales. The Les Girls Building stood prominently on the corner of Darlinghurst Road and Roslyn Street, in the heart of the Cross, an area popularly known as "the Golden Mile". The original Les Girls review, featuring gorgeous "drag queens" including the leading lady Carlotta, had performed in the building since 1963, but in the early 1990s the review decided to go on the road inspired by the film Priscilla, Queen of the Desert, leaving the building unused. The Les Girls building carried some intense history; it was owned by Sydney identity Abe Saffron; Kings Cross activist Juanita Nielsen was last seen here; various ghosts were rumoured to call it home. But in 1994 the building was still remarkably intact, a piece of living history. Seeing an opportunity, Sydney filmmaker and DJ Sean O'Brien approached the management, and procured the use of the cabaret room for Sunday nights. Sean named the Sunday night cabaret club after the Frank Sinatra song, and the Tender Trap first opened its doors on 11 December 1994, at the cocktail hour of 7pm. The headline performer on the opening night was singer Stuart Grant with his jazz combo. Stuart had previously been in the infamous 1980s post punk band the Primitive Calculators.

The Tender Trap arrived amidst a boom of eclectic contemporary clubs in Sydney, including Spicy Friday, Jamie and Vanessa's, The Sunset Club, Madd Club, Club Kooky, Get Down, and the bohemian Rat Parties. From the beginning, The Tender Trap endeavoured to recapture the vibe of swinging sixties Sydney in its venue, "a celebration of cocktail culture at its most sophisticated and savage". The Tender Trap referenced renowned Sydney clubs of an earlier era such as Chequers, The Latin Quarter, the Silver Spade Room, and Tabou. The essential mix was live cabaret entertainment, together with DJs playing their vinyl LP collections featuring lounge music, jazz, Latin, funk, soul, and more experimental sounds. The room's original fixtures were kept and it was dressed with period-appropriate furnishings: red cloth-covered tables, candles, chandeliers, velvet flock wallpaper, and the central focus – the cabaret stage. Every Sunday, the running order was fixed: from 7pm it was cocktails, laid back music and conversation, followed by the night's live act and dancing at 10:30pm.

== Creative team and acts ==
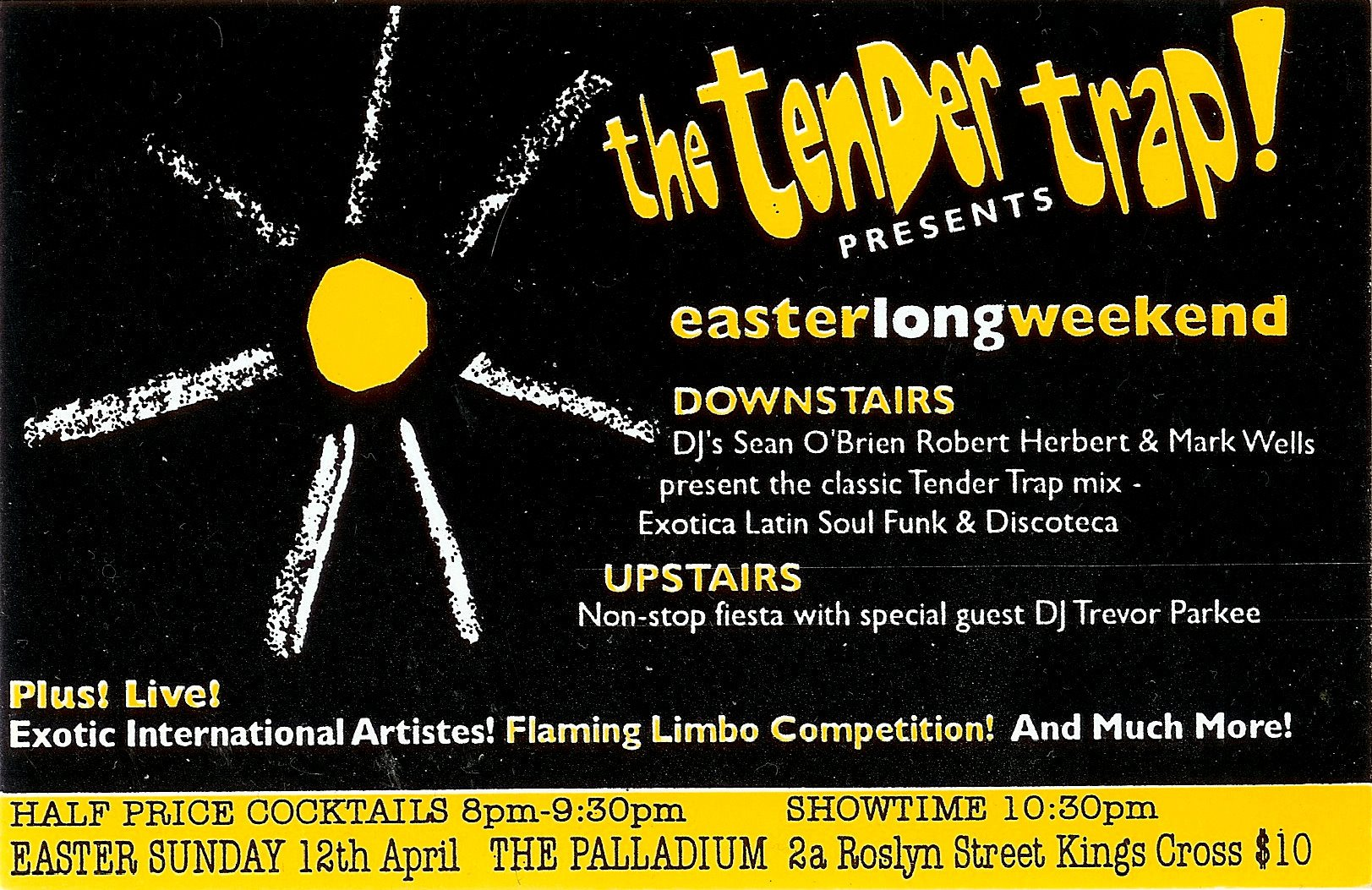
Tender Trap flyer c1999

During the first several months of operation and experimentation, Sean O'Brien gathered together the core Tender Trap team that would carry the club to the heights of success. The team were all from creative backgrounds, but new to the nightclub world. Filmmaker Sean O'Brien was the manager and creative director. Fellow filmmaker Dr. Robert Herbert was the art director, graphic designer, and "late night" DJ; renowned film editor Nick Meyers was the lighting designer, and in later years architect Rory Toomey the lighting operator; filmmakers Catherine Lowing and Sophie Jackson (aka "Schatzi") were the glamorous door girls; and other regular DJs included musician Andy Travers, Senor Bambu Brent Clough, Trevor “El Chino” Parkee, and jetsetters "King" Dom Harding and "International Guest" Mark Wells. Ali Higson, a leading light in the Sydney belly dance scene, discovered and managed the cabaret acts, the “international artistes”, as well as appearing herself as the Mysterious Zena and the ever popular Ms Claus at the Tender Trap Christmas parties. Some of the most popular acts that performed at the club were drawn from Sydney's diverse ethnic community, and included Chinese plate spinner Miss Jerry Liu, Yao Zu Fu – the Monkey Man!, the Pearls of Polynesia, Voodoo Queen Desiree, and of course an array of exotic belly dancers. Bands included the Andy 500, Les Gastronomes, and The Kaempfert Zone, bringing life to the easy listening classics. Other performers, such as Kay Armstrong and Paul Cordeiro, have gone on to become successful choreographers in the Australian contemporary dance scene. All were kept safe by handsome doorman, Murray.

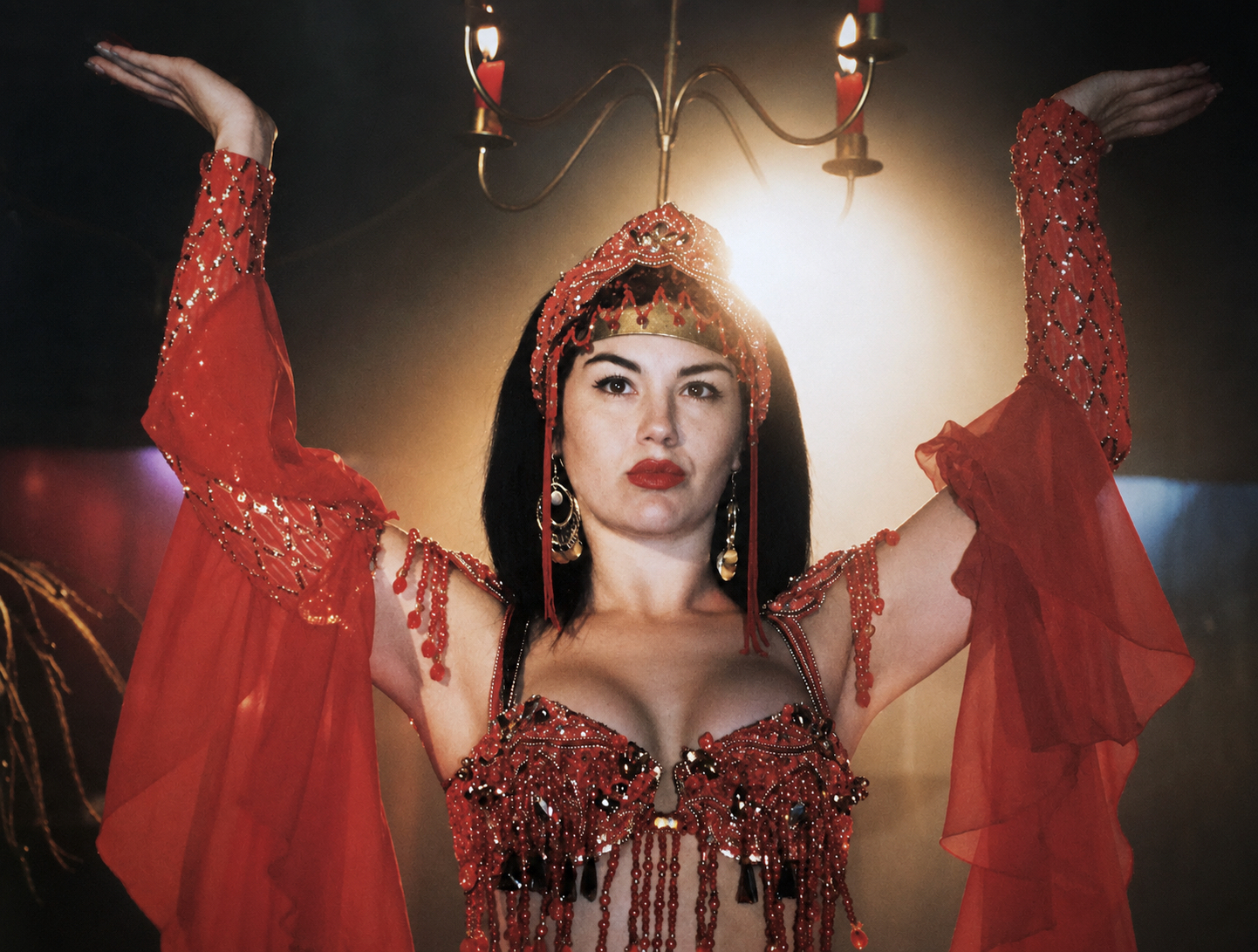
The Tender Trap (club) cabaret performer belly dancer Ali Higson.

== Patrons and celebrities ==
Apart from the acts, the stars of the club were the patrons. Tender Trap patrons were generally regarded by the press of the day to be a cut above – articles often refer to their eccentric, period fashion sense and funky moves. The most loyal patrons were a group known as "the Kids" – the Captain, Tito, 'Tache, Glen, Peta, Ineke, Jodie, & Megan. Other colourful patrons included "Lantern", the "Dancing Partner", Mr. Tambourine Man, Quiet Dave, Disco Phil, and Bongo John. A teenage Hana Shimada, later a co-director of her own successful GoodGod Small Club in downtown Sydney, was a regular sight on the dance-floor. All club regulars were issued the prized "Swingers" membership cards. However, the door policy was deliberately inclusive – all types were welcome, young and old, straight and gay, the sophisticated, the sexy, and the downright spooky. Celebrities had to pay to get in – they included Leonardo DiCaprio, Princess Stephanie of Monaco, Russell Crow, Geoffrey Rush, numerous touring rockers such as Urge Overkill and Donovan Leitch. Only one celebrity was ever admitted free as a special guest – Lamonte McLemore, one of the founding members of the American popular music vocal group the 5th Dimension. Lamonte received star treatment, and was feted by young ladies at his own table. Lamonte smiled enigmatically as a room full of people danced wildly to the 5th Dimension hits, Up, Up and Away, and Puppet Man, 30 years after those records had first hit the charts. At its peak, and on long weekend holidays, the Tender Trap could be packed with 1200 patrons, the queue stretching down Darlinghurst Road, all in a building licensed to entertain 300. The crush added to the sense of wild occasion, but for those wanting a more laid-back experience, mid-winter Tender Trap was the place to be.

== In film and literature ==
In January 2000 the Tender Trap had its final night, as the historic Les Girls building was shut down for major renovations, to become another characterless Sydney hotel. The Tender Trap lives on in the film that was shot on location at the club, The Sapphire Room. In 2026 The Sapphire Room received a 4K restoration, and was screened in the Harbour City Cinema series at the Art Gallery of NSW, as part of a tribute session to Robert Herbert. The club is also name-checked in Nikki Gemmell's book Shiver.

== The Powerhouse Collection ==
In 2023 Sydney's foremost cultural archive, the Powerhouse Museum, accepted into its collection the complete archive of the Tender Trap, including posters, flyers, hand tinted transparencies and original artwork, particularly highlighting the graphic design work of Robert Herbert. The items can be viewed via the Powerhouse Collection.
