= The Tender Trap (Fargo) =

- Fargo episode
- Episode no.: Season 5 Episode 6
- Directed by: Dana Gonzales
- Written by: Noah Hawley; Bob DeLaurentis
- Cinematography by: Pete Konczal
- Editing by: Christopher Nelson; Misha Syeed
- Production code: XFO05006
- Original air date: December 19, 2023
- Running time: 47 minutes

Guest appearances
- Lukas Gage as Lars Olmstead; Andrew Wheeler as Vivian Dugger; Steven McCarthy as Jordan Seymore; Rebecca Liddiard as Karen Tillman; Jan Bos as Wink Lyon; Conrad Coates as Bowman; Jessica Pohly as Agent Meyer; Nick Gomez as Agent Joaquin; Kudjo Fiakpui as Jerome

Episode chronology
← Previous "The Tiger"	Next → "Linda"
- Fargo (season 5)

"The Tender Trap" is the sixth episode of the fifth season of the American anthology black comedy–crime drama television series Fargo. It is the 47th overall episode of the series and was written by series creator Noah Hawley and co-executive producer Bob DeLaurentis, and directed by producer Dana Gonzales. It originally aired on FX on December 19, 2023.

The season is set in Minnesota and North Dakota in the fall of 2019, and follows Dorothy "Dot" Lyon, a seemingly typical Midwestern housewife living in Scandia, Minnesota, whose mysterious past comes back to haunt her after she lands in hot water with the authorities. One of those authorities is North Dakota Sheriff Roy Tillman, who has been searching for Dot for a long time. In the episode, Roy starts going after Lorraine's investors, while Indira faces challenges in her life.

According to Nielsen Media Research, the episode was seen by an estimated 0.457 million household viewers and gained a 0.07 ratings share among adults aged 18–49. The episode received positive reviews from critics, who praised the episode's writing, character development, and performances (particularly Jennifer Jason Leigh).

== Plot ==
At the Tender Trap bar, banker Vivian Dugger (Andrew Wheeler) is leaving with two friends when he is approached by Roy (Jon Hamm). Roy intimidates the friends into leaving and strips Dugger of his shirt and coat. He threatens him to not sell the bank to Lorraine (Jennifer Jason Leigh); Dugger reluctantly accepts.

As Indira (Richa Moorjani) prepares to leave for work, she gets into an argument with Lars (Lukas Gage). Roy slaps Karen (Rebecca Liddiard) for accidentally nicking his ear while cutting his hair. He then leaves with Gator (Joe Keery) to meet with Jordan Seymore (Steven McCarthy), the man who Dot (Juno Temple) had tricked Gator and his men into abducting in Wayne's place. Seymore has been tortured in a shed, and he has only yelled insults at Roy's crew. Roy kills Seymore, telling Gator that they got the wrong man, having just watched a commercial for Wayne's car dealership. Wayne (David Rysdahl) meets with FBI agents Meyer (Jessica Pohly) and Joaquin (Nick Gomez), who reveal that Dot is actually named Nadine Bump, but he is unable to give anything vital to the investigation.

Roy meets with Munch (Sam Spruell), paying his debt and contracting him in locating Dot. Munch prophesizes that both men have little time left to live, and drives off with a tracking device Gator has planted on his car. Indira meets with Meyer and Joaquin, who disclose that Roy is being investigated for spending taxpayer money on weapons sold to a right-wing militia led by his father-in-law. They want Indira's help in using Dot to uncover Roy's illegal activities. She agrees on the condition that they view Dot as a victim. Indira returns home, finding that Lars has left Scotty (Sienna King) home alone.

Indira takes Scotty to Lorraine, with Scotty reuniting with Wayne. After Indira questions and chastises Lorraine, she offers Indira a job in her security team and offers her support to pay off her debt. When Dugger doesn't respond to her calls, Lorraine sends Danish (Dave Foley) to track him to the Tender Trap. Danish meets with Dugger and connects him with Lorraine on the phone. Lorraine informs him that she's withdrawn her offer and has reported Dugger's mismanagement of the bank's funds to the SEC, prompting them to freeze his accounts; this has also resulted in his son's expulsion from Notre Dame. After hanging up, Lorraine reads a dossier on Dot that Indira had left with her, which depicts the abuse that Roy inflicted upon her.

== Production ==
=== Development ===
In November 2023, it was reported that the sixth episode of the season would be titled "The Tender Trap", and was to be written by series creator Noah Hawley and co-executive producer Bob DeLaurentis, and directed by producer Dana Gonzales. This was Hawley's 39th writing credit, DeLaurentis' fifth writing credit, and Gonzales' sixth directing credit.

Before the end credits, the episode features a card displaying the phone number and website for the National Domestic Violence Hotline.

== Reception ==
=== Viewers ===
In its original American broadcast, "The Tender Trap" was seen by an estimated 0.457 million household viewers and gained a 0.07 ratings share among adults aged 18–49, according to Nielsen Media Research. This means that 0.07 percent of all households with televisions watched the episode. This was a slight increase in viewership from the previous episode, which was watched by 0.451 million viewers with a 0.07 in the 18-49 demographics.

=== Critical reviews ===
"The Tender Trap" received positive reviews from critics. Tom Philip of The A.V. Club gave the episode a "B+" grade and wrote, "Well, my prayers have been answered after last week’s exercise in wheel-spinning: Fargo gets back on track in episode six thanks to some clever writing around the complicated politics of who we choose as allies and enemies, and an absolute tour de force performance from Richa Moorjani from beginning to end."

Alan Sepinwall wrote, "While Fargo has at times in the past done episodes without major characters, those usually come in more ensemble-y years. Dot, on the other hand, is the unquestioned protagonist of this season, so it feels notable when she’s missing for an entire week. In her absence, though, 'The Tender Trap' does some good work with the ensemble." Keith Phipps of Vulture gave the episode a 4 star rating out of 5 and wrote, "Wheels continue to turn this week, sometimes taking the season in unexpected directions. Is Lorraine kind of cool? Can Ole really be bought off? Will Trump be removed from office by impeachment, as Karen fears? Okay, one of those isn't particularly suspenseful. But everything else about the episode neatly ratchets up the suspense as it further complicates some already complex characters."

Scott Tobias of The New York Times wrote, "When Lorraine uses her power in the end to ruin Vivian's life, it serves as a coming attraction for things to come. She's still coming around to the idea of 'victims' being legitimate, but she lives to flex." Sean T. Collins of Decider wrote, "In the end, though, I think it's mostly the shock of recognition. Olmstead told Lorraine that she and Dorothy are similar. Perhaps in that moment, Lorraine, a woman who's spent a lifetime getting the better of men, feels in that moment that there but for the grace of God goes she."
