= The Castle (Fargo) =

- Fargo episode
- Episode no.: Season 2 Episode 9
- Directed by: Adam Arkin
- Written by: Noah Hawley; Steve Blackman
- Production code: XFO02009
- Original air date: December 7, 2015
- Running time: 47 minutes

Guest appearances
- Cristin Milioti as Betsy Solverson; Bokeem Woodbine as Mike Milligan; Zahn McClarnon as Hanzee Dent; Angus Sampson as Bear Gerhardt; Keir O'Donnell as Ben Schmidt; Terry Kinney as Chief Gibson; Wayne Duvall as Captain Jeb Cheney; Ryan O'Nan as Ricky G; Martin Freeman as narrator (voice)

Episode chronology
← Previous "Loplop"	Next → "Palindrome"
- Fargo (season 2)

"The Castle" is the ninth and penultimate episode of the second season of the FX anthology series Fargo, and the nineteenth episode of the series overall. It was written by series showrunner Noah Hawley alongside Steve Blackman and directed by Adam Arkin.

The episode first aired on December 7, 2015, and was seen by 1.31 million viewers. The episode was notable for the controversial appearance of a UFO during its climax, which served as a culmination of numerous UFO-related references recurring throughout the season. "The Castle" was acclaimed by critics, who praised its script, acting performances, and the climactic action sequence at the end.

== Plot ==
Lou and Hank call in the South Dakota State Police after recapturing the Blumquists. When Ed reveals his upcoming rendezvous with Milligan at Sioux Falls, State Police Captain Cheney hatches a dangerous scheme for him and Peggy to wear a wire for the meeting. Cheney has Lou escorted out of the state after strongly opposing the idea, though Hank stays behind. The Blumquists agree to the plan for lesser charges, and the police set up an ambush at the motel meeting spot. Hanzee lies to Floyd and Bear by claiming Dodd is being held inside the motel by the Kansas City mob.

Meanwhile, Lou stops at the gas station to call home, unaware his wife has collapsed, then discovers that Hanzee killed the attendant. Lou rushes to warn the others, and arrives to find the Gerhardts on the offensive against Cheney and his team. All but Ben and a wounded Hank are dead. Floyd realizes Hanzee's deception when one of the Gerhardt men desperately exclaims "They're cops!" As she turns to confront him, he stabs her to death. Bear attacks and attempts to strangle Lou.

A UFO appears in the midst of the chaos, distracting Bear and allowing Lou to fatally shoot him. The Blumquists flee the premises, pursued closely by Hanzee. Hank tells Lou to pursue the trio as police reinforcements arrive. Milligan and Gale Kitchen arrive upon the scene of the massacre and promptly leave. As the episode ends, the UFO's lights are seen flashing in the sky.

== Production ==
"The Castle" opens with the depiction of a fictional book titled "The History of True Crime in the Midwest," in which the events of both the film and the series are suggested to take place. The book is accompanied with a narration by Martin Freeman, who starred in the series' first season as Lester Nygaard. Hawley explained his idea for the book during season 1 itself, saying: "I like the idea that somewhere out there is a big, leather-bound book that's the history of true crime in the Midwest, and the movie was Chapter 4, Season 1 was Chapter 9 and [season 2] is Chapter 2. ... You can turn the pages of this book, and you just find this collection of stories. ... But I like the idea that these things are connected somehow, whether it's linearly or literally or thematically. That's what we play around with."

The episode features the "Massacre at Sioux Falls," an event that has been foreshadowed since the first season. In the season 1 episode "A Fox, a Rabbit, and a Cabbage," Lou Solverson recounts to Lorne Malvo a case he encountered in 1979: The season 2 premiere "Waiting for Dutch" opens with a scene depicting the filming of a fictional film titled "Massacre at Sioux Falls," in which an actor portraying a Native American waits for Ronald Reagan to arrive on set. Prior to the episode, commentators drew attention to a real-life homicide that occurred at Sioux Falls in 1973, in which three men impersonating police officers shot and killed four male teenagers, while a fifth victim claimed to have been sexually assaulted by one of the perpetrators. The episode's telling of the events bears little resemblance to the 1973 crime, and instead depicts a massive shootout at the fictional Motor Hotel between the South Dakota State Police, members of the Gerhardt family, Lou, Hank, and Hanzee Dent.

Hawley told Entertainment Weekly that the Sioux Falls massacre was decided as a plot point early in the production of the second season, and that the intention was to subvert audience expectations of which characters would play key roles. "We wanted to do it in an organic way that would bring these characters into collision. Certainly the characters who survived long enough to collide are not the ones you thought would survive, or the ones you thought would be the big players. I don’t think anybody thought Hanzee (Zahn McClarnon) would be the driving force into our endgame, which is very exciting. ... We also set up all three parties to collide, but the reality is Mike Milligan (Bokeem Woodbine) doesn’t even make it there. ... I’m very attracted to the idea of unpredictability. If you make your characters real characters and set them in motion, they’re not always going to end up where the audience thinks they’ll end up."

=== Appearance of the UFO ===
"The Castle" features the appearance of a UFO at the end of its climax; while Bear Gerhardt strangles Lou nearly to death, the UFO suddenly appears directly above them giving Lou the opportunity to kill a distracted Bear. Before the episode, the season had included numerous references to UFOs to reflect the popularity of conspiracy theories in the 1970s, though most were vague or subtly placed in the background. Compared to a prior appearance in the season premiere, the UFO is less ambiguous and bears direct consequence on the events that occur. It also receives direct acknowledgment twice: once when Peggy tells Ed that it's "just a flying saucer" and that they have to leave, and again in the season finale "Palindrome" when Lou admits that his police report would be considered implausible if he were to mention being saved by a "spacecraft." Hawley later confirmed that it was indeed a UFO: "There were some people [at the network] who wanted the UFO to be shot in a way so that it could have actually been a balloon. My feeling was always, 'No, it’s a UFO. It is what it is.'"

The UFO's appearance provoked discussion and controversy among critics and fans alike, some of whom criticized the moment as a "deus ex machina" and considered the literal inclusion of a science-fiction device to be inappropriate for the series. Hawley elaborated on the scene in interviews and explained some of its influences, which included the Coen brothers' 2002 film The Man Who Wasn't There as well as the real-life 1979 Val Johnson incident in which a Minnesota deputy sheriff claimed to have encountered a UFO. Hawley stated that the idea of "accept[ing] the mystery," which he called a "staple of the Coen Bros. philosophy in their films," guided his decision to include a UFO in Fargo. Additionally, he said that the UFO represents the series' false claim of being "based on a true story", which to Hawley offers a commentary on the nature of how history is retold: "It’s not just that truth is stranger than fiction, it’s that what we call truth is a small part of the historic picture. There are so many elements that usually get weeded out of the story so you can have a simpler narrative." In a later interview, Hawley named the original 1996 film as an inspiration for the UFO; namely, the scene with Mike Yanagita, which serves no purpose in the film's plot yet exists both as a character moment and as a representation of its apparent "realism."

Very early on, I asked, ‘What is our Mike Yanagita?' Mike Yanagita was the character in the movie ‘Fargo’ who Marge met after being friends in high school and they had a meal, and he talked about marrying his high school sweetheart and then she died and he was so lonely. But then, later, you found out he made all that up. And I thought, ‘Why is this in the movie?’ It has nothing to do with the movie — except the movie says, ‘This is a true story.’ They put it in there because it ‘happened.’ Otherwise you wouldn’t put it in there. The world of ‘Fargo’ needs those elements; those random, odd, truth-is-stranger-than-fiction elements.

== Reception ==
=== Ratings ===
The episode first aired on December 7, 2015, and was watched by 1.31 million viewers. This was a drop of approximately 0.01 million viewers from the previous week's episode, "Loplop."

=== Critical reception ===
"The Castle" was acclaimed by critics, who praised the writing, acting, directing, and the episode's climax. The episode currently holds a 100% rating on Rotten Tomatoes, with the consensus reading "With "The Castle," Fargo delivers a penultimate episode that is both explosive and contemplative, setting the stage for a humdinger of a finale."

IGN's Terri Schwartz gave the episode a 9.8 out of 10, believing that the episode lived up to the anticipation of its violent climax, with particular praise towards how it handled the fate of the Gerhardts. Schwartz responded positively to the UFO scene, stating "I didn't expect Fargo to go all the way with its extra-terrestrial storyline even though I was hoping it would, but it seems each season of this show is going to include one sequence that can't quite be explained and deeply roots this story in fiction. Last year was the fish falling from the sky, and this year is a flying saucer. The parallel between such an inexplicable burst of violence unfolding the same night as an inexplicable sight like an alien spacecraft makes this a somber touch on an otherwise incredible sequence." She also praised Kirsten Dunst's performance as Peggy during the episode's ending.

Zack Handlen of The A.V. Club awarded the episode an A grade, complimenting "how well this episode delivers on the promises it’s been making from the start without sacrificing its interest in absurdity." He felt that all the events of the season leading up to the episode demonstrated that "Hawley has, beneath all the artifice he delights in putting on (and which makes the show such a pleasure to watch), a good grasp on the vagaries of human behavior." Handlen also praised the inclusion of the UFO as consistent with the rest of the season's storytelling, saying: "Everything here makes sense, more or less, but it’s also bizarre and loopy and easily preventabl[e], and it cost people their lives. Which is why the UFO is entirely fitting. It’s the nonsense given a physical presence, like some cold, unknowable god observing us from afar. There’s certainly stuff to unpack symbolically, but what struck me most powerfully in the moment is how inevitable it felt, how of a piece with everything that came before. (...) It offers no information, no explanation for itself or anything around it; it spares no one, and gives nothing but light, confusion, and mystery. It is, in short, just another part of the whole damn mess, (...) as of right now, I think Hawley has earned the device."

Ben Travers of Indiewire felt that the UFO functioned as a metaphor for an "all-knowing force from above looking down in judgment" at the series' events, and that the use of aliens (as opposed to God) conveyed this theme more fittingly as it "represented the paranoia of the post-Vietnam era." Additionally, Travers considered the acknowledgment within the episode of Hanzee Dent's mysterious motives signified the writers themselves "pleading ignorance via a less than omniscient narrator," though he felt that the decision not to speak for a Native American character was "respectful to a point of view undoubtedly foreign to any white man." He went on to praise Zahn McClarnon's performance as Hanzee, as well as those of Jean Smart and Patrick Wilson. Joanna Robinson of Vanity Fair called the episode the series' "most ambitious hour yet," and pointed out similarities between the UFO scene and the use of supernatural elements in both the series' first season and in prior work from the Coen brothers, including The Man Who Wasn't There, O Brother, Where Art Thou?, and A Serious Man. She praised the episode for realizing various recurring references throughout the season. Conversely, Scott Tobias of The New York Times criticized both the UFO scene and the use of the narration, stating: "Between the U.F.O. and the framing device, “The Castle” was a prime — and unfortunately timed — example of the show's weakness for being too clever by half. Mr. Hawley and his team have gotten more confident in both the plotting and the direction of “Fargo” this season, but all that swagger can spill over into excess. Sometimes less is more, even on a show this extravagantly stylized."
