= Loplop (Fargo) =

- Fargo episode
- Episode no.: Season 2 Episode 8
- Directed by: Keith Gordon
- Written by: Bob DeLaurentis
- Cinematography by: Craig Wrobleski
- Editing by: Regis Kimble
- Production code: XFO02008
- Original air date: November 30, 2015
- Running time: 63 minutes

Guest appearances
- Jeffrey Donovan as Dodd Gerhardt; Bokeem Woodbine as Mike Milligan; Elizabeth Marvel as Constance Heck; Zahn McClarnon as Hanzee Dent

Episode chronology
← Previous "Did You Do This? No, You Did It!"	Next → "The Castle"
- Fargo (season 2)

"Loplop" is the eighth episode of the second season of the American anthology black comedy–crime drama television series Fargo. It is the 18th overall episode of the series and was written by Bob DeLaurentis and directed by Keith Gordon. It originally aired on FX on November 30, 2015.

The season takes place in the Upper Midwest in March 1979. It follows the lives of a young couple, Peggy and Ed Blumquist, as they attempt to cover up the hit and run and homicide of Rye Gerhardt, the son of Floyd Gerhardt, matriarch of the Gerhardt crime family. During this time, Minnesota state trooper Lou Solverson, and Rock County sheriff Hank Larsson, investigate three homicides linked to Rye. In the episode, Ed and Peggy go on the run with Dodd tied up, all while the police and Hanzee go after them.

According to Nielsen Media Research, the episode was seen by an estimated 1.32 million household viewers and gained a 0.4 ratings share among adults aged 18–49. The episode received critical acclaim, with critics praising the writing, performances, pacing, directing and use of split screen.

== Plot ==
After escaping from police custody, Ed (Jesse Plemons) returns home, discovering that Peggy (Kirsten Dunst) has tied up Dodd (Jeffrey Donovan) in their basement. After knocking Dodd unconscious, they escape in Dodd's car, putting him in the trunk. They leave their house just as Lou (Patrick Wilson) and Hank (Ted Danson) arrive. They inspect the house until Hank is taken to the hospital for his wounds. After they leave, Hanzee (Zahn McClarnon) sneaks into the house, finding the hotel reservation for the Lifespring seminar that Peggy was planning to attend.

Ed and Peggy stay at a cabin in the outskirts of Canistota that belongs to Ed's uncle. Ed leaves the house to make a phone call to the Gerhardts in an attempt to trade Dodd for their exoneration, but the Gerhardts don't appear to be interested. (Note: Result of Bear Gerhardt refusing to cooperate, as depicted in "Did You Do This? No, You Did It!".) Back in the cabin, a tied up Dodd makes crude remarks at Peggy, causing her to stab him twice. Following the hotel's address, Hanzee reaches Sioux Falls and stops at a bar. After the patrons make crude remarks about his heritage, Hanzee shoots them, as well as two police officers who arrived. He then gets to the hotel, where Constance (Elizabeth Marvel) reserved a room.

While Ed struggles in contacting the Gerhardts, Peggy calls Constance to explain her absence. Threatened by Hanzee, Constance tries to get her location through the phone. Peggy only reveals that she is in a cabin in the outskirts. The next day, Ed leaves again to contact the Gerhardts. While Peggy watches a movie on the TV, Dodd breaks free. After the Gerhardts once again show no interest, Ed decides to call Mike Milligan (Bokeem Woodbine), who just killed his replacement. He offers to give him Dodd in exchange for Milligan killing the Gerhardts, which he accepts to do. They both agree to meet the next day at a motel in Sioux Falls. After Ed leaves, Hanzee arrives at the gas station, where he intimidates the owner into revealing Ed's location, just describing it as somewhere near the lake. After Hanzee leaves, the owner calls the police when he sees a newspaper with Hanzee's mugshot.

Ed returns to the cabin, discovering Peggy unconscious on the floor. Dodd then surprises him by hanging up with the knots. While Dodd is distracted, Peggy stabs him in the foot with a knife and removes the handle so he can't remove it. Dodd is forced to levitate his foot to pass the blade and is then knocked unconscious with a fire iron. After she saves Ed, Hanzee arrives at the cabin. He gets into a conversation with Peggy, angering Dodd, who insults him and asks him for help. Hanzee then shoots Dodd in the head, killing him. He then has Peggy cut his hair. Just as she is about to start, Ed notices Lou and Hank approaching the cabin. When Hanzee notes them too, he starts shooting. Peggy seizes the opportunity to stab him in the back with the scissors. With no ammunition, Hanzee is forced to flee. Lou and Hank then enter, with Ed and Peggy surrendering.

== Production ==
=== Development ===
In November 2015, it was reported that the eighth episode of the second season would be titled "Loplop", and was to be directed by Keith Gordon and written by Bob DeLaurentis. This was DeLaurentis' second writing credit, and Gordon's second directing credit.

== Reception ==
=== Viewers ===
In its original American broadcast, "Loplop" was seen by an estimated 1.32 million household viewers and gained a 0.4 ratings share among adults aged 18–49, according to Nielsen Media Research. This means that 0.4 percent of all households with televisions watched the episode. This was a 6% increase in viewership from the previous episode, which was watched by 1.24 million viewers with a 0.3 in the 18-49 demographics.

=== Critical reviews ===
"Loplop" received critical acclaim. The review aggregator website Rotten Tomatoes reported a 100% approval rating with an average rating of 9.1/10 for the episode, based on 16 reviews. The site's consensus states: "In a strategic move, 'Loplop' takes a comedic downshift in order to gun the engine for the last two episodes of Fargo's second season."

Terri Schwartz of IGN gave the episode an "amazing" 9.5 out of 10 and wrote in her verdict, "Fargo went non-linear for a week to do a deep dive into Peggy and Ed. While I don't think anyone was upset to see Dodd gone, I think the focus on the Blumquists blunted the edges on what is a major death (though hopefully we'll feel the repercussions in next week's episode). The small step back in time to catch up with the Butcher and his bride slowed the momentum Fargo was on, but 'Loplop' also put the pieces in place for it to ramp back up again the final two episodes of Season 2."

Zack Handlen of The A.V. Club gave the episode an "A" grade and wrote, "Things get a bit crazy there, and it's a mark in this show's favor that I have absolutely no idea what's going to happen next."

Alan Sepinwall of HitFix wrote, "What I didn't expect – even though the first, second, and third words I would use to describe this season, despite all the violence therein, is 'fun' – was for so much of 'Loplop' to turn into a dark domestic comedy where the two polite, clueless civilians play house out in the woods while giving Dodd some long-awaited comeuppance." Ben Travers of IndieWire gave the episode an "A-" grade and wrote, "'Loplop' marked an eventful, streamlined hour-plus of television, marked with perfectly-placed moments of levity that helped break up some truly tense scenes." Richard Vine of The Guardian wrote, "The split screens were just amazing this episode, not only the one with Ed and Peggy in the car, but also the one where Ed is walking to the pay phone and Hanzee is driving to get him and the one where Peggy and Constance are on the phone connecting with Ed getting no answer from the Gerhardts."

Kevin P. Sullivan of Entertainment Weekly wrote, "Aside from being one of this season's most structurally experimental hours, the near-bottle episode 'Loplop' gave Kirsten Dunst the opportunity to earn her Emmy Award." Brian Tallerico of Vulture gave the episode a 4 star rating out of 5 and wrote, "Although it has a slightly slower pace than we've seen, 'Loplop' was ultimately just as rewarding as the rest of this season has been." Scott Tobias of The New York Times wrote, "'Loplop' picks up on all the subplots that were sidelined during last week's episode and strikes a uniquely delirious tone, poised somewhere between absurdist dark comedy and a blood-caked personal odyssey."

Libby Hill of Los Angeles Times wrote, "It's appropriate... for an episode that spent so much of its time on the spiritual journeys of two disjointed souls to conclude with those two individuals finally interacting and coming to an understanding." Caralynn Lippo of TV Fanatic gave the episode a 4.5 star rating out of 5 and wrote, "'Loplop', like 'Did You Do This? No, You Did It!', set everything up perfectly. 'The Castle' and 'Palindrome' are going to be a hell of a ride." Amy Amatangelo of Paste gave the episode a 9.3 rating out of 10 and wrote, "We know there's a big bloody scene coming to Sioux Falls, and with only two episodes left this season, we know the death count will rise."
