= Did You Do This? No, You Did It! =

- Fargo episode
- Episode no.: Season 2 Episode 7
- Directed by: Keith Gordon
- Written by: Noah Hawley; Matt Wolpert; Ben Nedivi
- Cinematography by: Craig Wrobleski
- Editing by: Skip Macdonald; Curtis Thurber
- Production code: XFO02007
- Original air date: November 23, 2015
- Running time: 61 minutes

Guest appearances
- Cristin Milioti as Betsy Solverson; Bokeem Woodbine as Mike Milligan; Nick Offerman as Karl Weathers; Keir O'Donnell as Ben Schmidt; Terry Kinney as Gibson; Ryan O'Nan as Ricky G; Rachel Keller as Simone Gerhardt; Angus Sampson as Bear Gerhardt

Episode chronology
← Previous "Rhinoceros"	Next → "Loplop"
- Fargo (season 2)

"Did You Do This? No, You Did It!" is the seventh episode of the second season of the American anthology black comedy–crime drama television series Fargo. It is the 17th overall episode of the series and was written by series creator Noah Hawley and consulting producers Matt Wolpert and Ben Nedivi and directed by Keith Gordon. It originally aired on FX on November 23, 2015.

The season takes place in the Upper Midwest in March 1979. It follows the lives of a young couple, Peggy and Ed Blumquist, as they attempt to cover up the hit and run and homicide of Rye Gerhardt, the son of Floyd Gerhardt, matriarch of the Gerhardt crime family. During this time, Minnesota state trooper Lou Solverson, and Rock County sheriff Hank Larsson, investigate three homicides linked to Rye. In the episode, Floyd is taken by the authorities and is offered a deal to exonerate her family. Meanwhile, Simone's cover is blown and faces consequences for her actions.

According to Nielsen Media Research, the episode was seen by an estimated 1.24 million household viewers and gained a 0.3 ratings share among adults aged 18–49. The episode received critical acclaim, with critics praising the character development, writing, cinematography and performances, particularly Jean Smart and Rachel Keller.

== Plot ==
The Gerhardts bury Otto and Rye in their family graveyard, despite the latter's body being nowhere to be found. The family is also losing the battle against the Kansas City crime family, despite killing some of their associates. Lou (Patrick Wilson) and Ben (Keir O'Donnell) arrive at the farm and take Floyd (Jean Smart) into custody.

The police ask Floyd to cooperate with them in exchange for a deal: her family will be exonerated of their crimes if she helps them by providing crucial information. At his hotel room, Milligan (Bokeem Woodbine) is reprimanded by his boss Hamish Broker (Adam Arkin) for his associates' deaths and tells him to kill the Gerhardts within two days. Simone (Rachel Keller) furiously confronts him for killing Otto and almost killing her and Floyd. Just as Gale Kitchen (Brad Mann) is about to kill her, Lou and Ben burst into the room, having been tipped off by Floyd. Ben escorts Simone out of the room but she hits him in the groin and escapes. However, she is seen by Bear (Angus Sampson) and his henchman Ricky G (Ryan O'Nan). Bear then tells her to come with him, while Ricky G takes her car.

Betsy (Cristin Milioti) arrives home and is shocked to find Karl (Nick Offerman) and Sonny (Daniel Beirne) there. Karl states that Lou asked them to watch over her while he works on the case. Meanwhile, Bear drives Simone to the woods and forces her to walk deep down the woods, revealing that he knows she betrayed the family. After reaching a certain spot, he forces her to kneel down as he prepares to shoot her. A panicked Simone asks for another chance and even suggests spying for them, but Bear is not convinced and kills her. He then drives back to the farm, where Ricky tells him someone called with information on Dodd, but Bear is not interested.

With her family immunity deal arranged, Floyd reveals how the Kansas City crime family operates. The police manage to take down most of the family's operations. Broker then calls a defeated Milligan, dismissing him and informing him that he will send an enforcer known as "The Undertaker" to fix his failure. Floyd is released and picked up by Bear and his henchmen. Hank (Ted Danson) informs Lou and Ben that Hanzee is wanted for killing two police officers in Sioux Falls, South Dakota while looking for the Blumquists. At the Solverson home, Betsy confides in Karl that she is taking placebo pills and wants Lou to move on after she dies. While visiting Hank's house, Betsy discovers strange symbol drawings in his study room.

Floyd and Bear return to the farm, where Ricky informs them that Hanzee has found out Dodd's whereabouts. The Undertaker (Markus Parillo) arrives at the hotel room with his security guards. However, Milligan and Gale easily kill them, planning to put the blame on the Gerhardts. The phone rings and Milligan answers, revealing Ed (Jesse Plemons) on the other end of the phone call. Ed reveals that he has Dodd in the trunk of a car. After hanging up, Ed drives away from the rest stop, with Peggy nowhere to be seen.

== Production ==
=== Development ===
In October 2015, it was reported that the seventh episode of the second season would be titled "Did You Do This? No, You Did It!", and was to be directed by Keith Gordon and written by series creator Noah Hawley and consulting producers Matt Wolpert and Ben Nedivi. This was Hawley's 14th writing credit, Wolpert's second writing credit, Nedivi's second writing credit and Gordon's first directing credit.

=== Writing ===
Originally, Rachel Keller would appear for only six episodes, but was notified that it would be extended by an episode. On her character's death, she commented "I read it and I was equally terrified that I was the one who had to do the scene, but also so honored, because it was so well-written and sad." The execution scene drew comparisons to Miller's Crossing, another film directed by the Coen brothers.

== Reception ==
=== Viewers ===
In its original American broadcast, "Did You Do This? No, You Did It!" was seen by an estimated 1.24 million household viewers and gained a 0.3 ratings share among adults aged 18–49, according to Nielsen Media Research. This means that 0.3 percent of all households with televisions watched the episode. This was a 7% increase in viewership from the previous episode, which was watched by 1.15 million viewers with a 0.3 in the 18-49 demographics.

=== Critical reviews ===
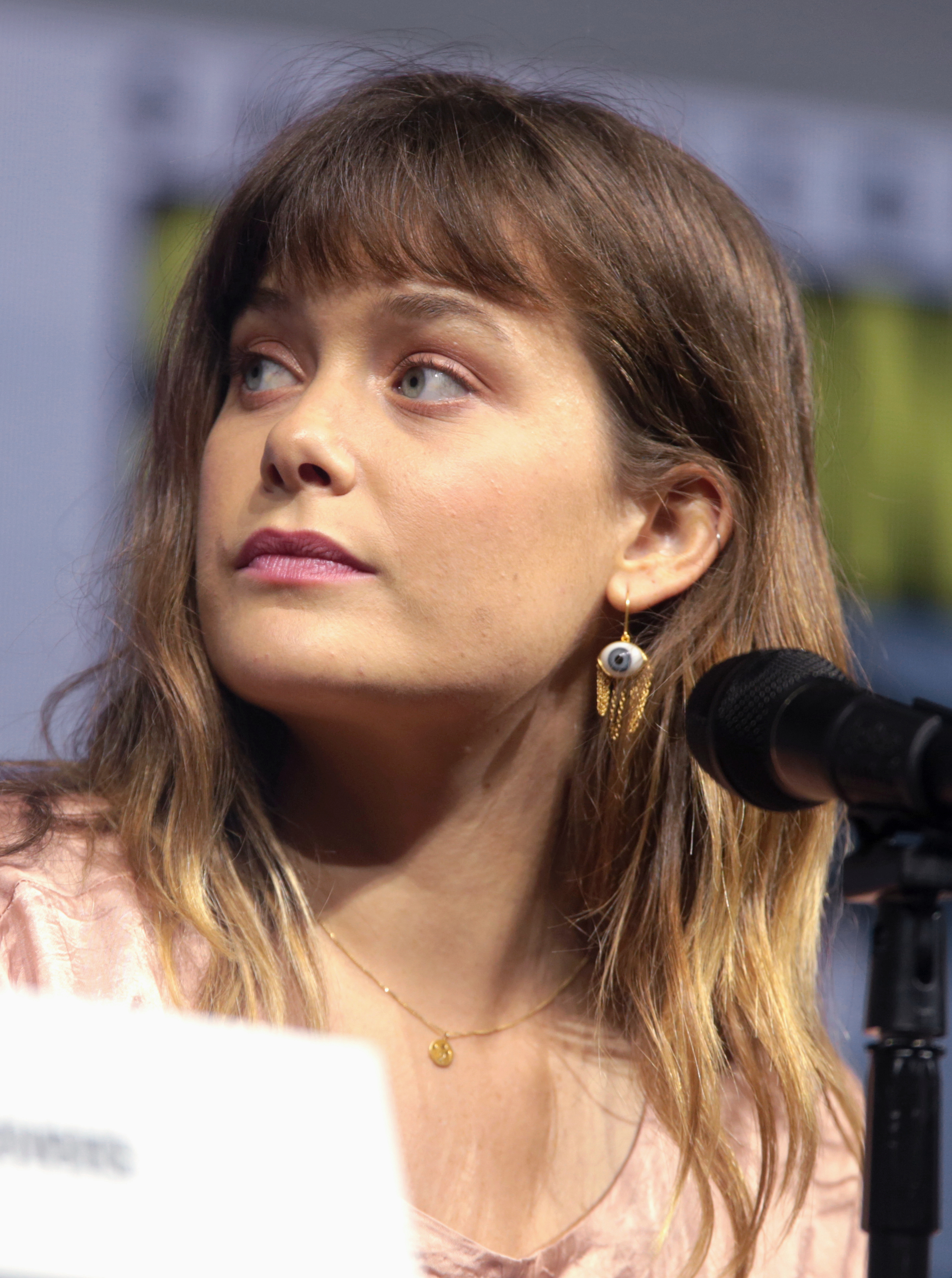
Rachel Keller's performance in the episode was praised by critics.

"Did You Do This? No, You Did It!" received critical acclaim. The review aggregator website Rotten Tomatoes reported a 100% approval rating with an average rating of 9.2/10 for the episode, based on 13 reviews. The site's consensus states: "'Did You Do This? No, You Did It!' is an explosive episode, bringing Fargo's ongoing tension to an exciting and emotional head."

Terri Schwartz of IGN gave the episode an "amazing" 9.7 out of 10 and wrote in her verdict, "The bloodshed got personal in this week's episode, and Fargo placed the right amount of weight on the effect of the Gerhardt-vs-Kansas City War in 'Did You Do This? No, You Did It!' Its artistic style got the better of it in one key moment, but overall Fargo is delivering a season that puts its peers to shame."

Zack Handlen of The A.V. Club gave the episode an "A-" grade and wrote, "This show looks great, doesn't it? And it sounds great, too. The colors are crisp and wintery and a little sad, and the music is full of unexpected song choices, plus some solid scoring that's reminiscent of the original movie's soundtrack. Even when scenes aren't working perfectly, it's a pleasure to sit back and enjoy them, and I feel like I don't stress that often enough in these reviews. There are plenty of well-made shows on TV these days, but Fargo stands out, thanks to its setting and the overall consistency of its aesthetic."

Alan Sepinwall of HitFix wrote, "The whole point of doing these anthology miniseries is that the investment is short and you know that everything will be different the following year. But even knowing that this story will wrap up in a few weeks, and we may not see any of these people again – or may see a few of them at very different ages, played by different actors – I'm attached. That's how great the show has been again, even in an episode like this where you could see the strings more clearly than usual." Ben Travers of IndieWire gave the episode a "B+" grade and wrote, "The complex emotions at play, as well as some truly heart-warming moments... helped make 'Did You Do This? No, You Did It!' a welcome return to form for Fargo, which had dipped a bit in excitement and emotional attachment over the past two weeks." Richard Vine of The Guardian wrote, "Almost don't want to think it, but for any season one viewers, just hearing about Sioux Falls, Hank, Lou and Hanzee... it doesn't exactly bode well, does it?"

Kevin P. Sullivan of Entertainment Weekly wrote, "Part of Fargo's mastery is its complete understanding of tropes and cinematic language." Brian Tallerico of Vulture gave the episode a perfect 5 star rating out of 5 and wrote, "With just three episodes left in Fargo's second season, Noah Hawley and his team pull off a number of daring moves this week." Scott Tobias of The New York Times wrote, "The awkwardly titled 'Did You Do This? No, You Did It!' plows through a lot of narrative business, but it coheres around the theme of family values, with Simone's demise at the heart of it."

Libby Hill of Los Angeles Times wrote, "It hearkened back to one of the most iconic episodes of television ever, "Long Term Parking", in which a beloved informant is taken on a long drive into the woods before being eliminated." Caralynn Lippo of TV Fanatic gave the episode a 4.75 star rating out of 5 and wrote, "Oh, jeez. Well, gosh darn. Uff da. Insert other various Fargo-isms here, because I am basically speechless after the closing third of 'Did You Do This? No, You Did It!." Amy Amatangelo of Paste gave the episode a 9.1 rating out of 10 and wrote, "The night's finest performance belonged to Rachel Keller whose Simone just broke my heart."
