= Fear and Trembling (Fargo) =

- Fargo episode
- Episode no.: Season 2 Episode 4
- Directed by: Michael Uppendahl
- Written by: Steve Blackman
- Editing by: Skip Macdonald
- Production code: XFO02004
- Original air date: November 2, 2015
- Running time: 52 minutes

Guest appearances
- Cristin Milioti as Betsy Solverson; Jeffrey Donovan as Dodd Gerhardt; Bokeem Woodbine as Mike Milligan; Brad Garrett as Joe Bulo; Mike Bradecich as Skip Sprang; Elizabeth Marvel as Constance Heck; Michael Hogan as Otto Gerhardt; Rachel Keller as Simone Gerhardt; Zahn McClarnon as Hanzee Dent; Angus Sampson as Bear Gerhardt

Episode chronology
← Previous "The Myth of Sisyphus"	Next → "The Gift of the Magi"
- Fargo (season 2)

"Fear and Trembling" is the fourth episode of the second season of the FX anthology series Fargo, and the fourteenth episode of the series overall. It was written by Steve Blackman and directed by Michael Uppendahl.

The episode first aired on November 2, 2015, and was seen by 1.28 million viewers.

== Plot ==
In 1951, Fargo, North Dakota, Otto brings Dodd along to a movie theater for a meeting with Kellerman, the man who killed Otto's father. Dodd kills him and avenges his grandfather while Otto kills Kellerman's henchmen.

28 years later, as Otto is being taken to a doctor's appointment, Simone has sex with Milligan, inadvertently mentioning the doctor visit. The Kitchens then eliminate Otto's guards in the parking lot outside the medical clinic, leaving Otto unharmed.

Meanwhile, Floyd, Dodd, and Bear meet with Bulo and propose a counter-offer to his buyout in the form of a partnership. Bulo balks at the idea, since Dodd assaulted two of his men earlier. Bulo phones his superiors who reject the Gerhardts' proposal. They now offer two million dollars less than the first offer and demand the Gerhardts' complete surrender.

In Luverne, Hanzee's investigation leads him to find Rye's belt buckle in the Blumquist fireplace. Lou talks to the Blumquists regarding his suspicions that they are involved in Rye's death, but they stubbornly refuse to cooperate. He warns them of the Gerhardts' violent history.

At the Gerhardt farm, Floyd tells the family to prepare for war.

== Production ==
The music for the episode was provided by series composer Jeff Russo.

== Reception ==
"Fear and Trembling" received critical acclaim, particularly for its pace and acting. It holds a 100% rating on Rotten Tomatoes based on reviews from 15 critics: the critical consensus is "Fargo ratchets up the tension in "Fear and Trembling" by setting up a showdown between its expanded cast of characters."

In a highly positive review, Terri Schwartz of IGN gave the episode a 9.8 rating out of 10, concluding that "Fargo brought together some of its key storylines, but prioritized the ways they affect its characters over ways they affect its plot for fantastic results."
