= The Myth of Sisyphus (Fargo) =

- Fargo episode
- Episode no.: Season 2 Episode 3
- Directed by: Michael Uppendahl
- Written by: Bob DeLaurentis
- Production code: XFO02003
- Original air date: October 26, 2015
- Running time: 47 minutes

Guest appearances
- Cristin Milioti as Betsy Solverson; Jeffrey Donovan as Dodd Gerhardt; Bokeem Woodbine as Mike Milligan; Brad Garrett as Joe Bulo; Mike Bradecich as Skip Sprang; Elizabeth Marvel as Constance Heck

Episode chronology
← Previous "Before the Law"	Next → "Fear and Trembling"
- Fargo (season 2)

"The Myth of Sisyphus" is the third episode of the second season of the FX anthology series Fargo, and the thirteenth episode of the series overall. It was written by Bob DeLaurentis and directed by Michael Uppendahl.

The episode first aired on October 26, 2015, and was seen by 1.21 million viewers.

== Plot ==
The manhunt for Rye begins after fingerprints are pulled from the gun found at the Waffle Hut. At the same time, Milligan, Dodd and his henchman Hanzee (Zahn McClarnon) each conduct an independent search for him.

Hank encounters Betsy while hanging a wanted picture of Rye at the local beauty salon. She speculates that Rye is the victim of a potential hit and run. Peggy discounts Betsy's theory, but quickly convinces Ed to crash her car a second time to explain the damage caused by hitting Rye.

Meanwhile, Lou travels to Fargo to meet Detective Ben Schmidt (Keir O'Donnell). They visit the Gerhardt farm and have a tense encounter with the clan. Lou then visits Skip's typewriter store, where he encounters Milligan and the Kitchen brothers, also searching for clues, resulting in another standoff.

Dodd's daughter Simone (Rachel Keller) tips off Hanzee about a lead on Rye, and they ambush Skip at Rye's apartment. He is brought to Dodd for interrogation. Dodd learns that Skip has no information on his brother's whereabouts. He and Hanzee force Skip into an open grave and bury him alive in hot asphalt. Dodd then tells Hanzee to do what is necessary to find Rye, beginning in Luverne.

== Production ==
The music for the episode was provided by series composer Jeff Russo.

== Reception ==
=== Ratings ===
The episode first aired in the United States on FX on October 19, 2015 and obtained 1.21 million viewers.

=== Critical reception ===
"The Myth of Sisyphus" received critical acclaim, particularly for its pace and Patrick Wilson's performance. It holds a perfect 100% rating on Rotten Tomatoes: the critical consensus is "'The Myth of Sisyphus' is a tense episode of Fargo, highlighted by an especially impressive performance by Patrick Wilson."

In a highly positive review, Terri Schwartz of IGN gave the episode a 9.3 rating out of 10, concluding that "With great direction and excellent acting, Fargo delivers a great third outing. The three tense showdowns underline the fact that stakes are being raised, as Lou Solverson fights the good fight to try to combat the evil deeds being committed around him. But he is in over his head, and is beginning to notice. Time is running out for him to discover what happened to Rye before more nefarious forces do and turn the Waffle Hut clue trail cold."
