= Palindrome (Fargo) =

- Fargo episode
- Episode no.: Season 2 Episode 10
- Directed by: Adam Arkin
- Written by: Noah Hawley
- Cinematography by: Dana Gonzales
- Editing by: Skip Macdonald
- Production code: XFO02010
- Original air date: December 14, 2015
- Running time: 54 minutes

Guest appearances
- Allison Tolman as Molly Solverson; Joey King as Greta Grimly; Colin Hanks as Gus Grimly; Keith Carradine as Lou Solverson; Cristin Milioti as Betsy Solverson; Bokeem Woodbine as Mike Milligan; Keir O'Donnell as Ben Schmidt; Ryan O'Nan as Ricky G; Michael Hogan as Otto Gerhardt; Rachel Keller as Simone Gerhardt; Zahn McClarnon as Hanzee Dent; Angus Sampson as Bear Gerhardt

Episode chronology
← Previous "The Castle"	Next → "The Law of Vacant Places"
- Fargo season 2

"Palindrome" is the tenth episode and season finale of the second season of the American anthology black comedy–crime drama television series Fargo. It is the 20th overall episode of the series and was written by series creator Noah Hawley and directed by Adam Arkin. It originally aired on FX on December 14, 2015.

The season takes place in the Upper Midwest in March 1979. It follows the lives of a young couple, Peggy and Ed Blumquist, as they attempt to cover up the hit and run and homicide of Rye Gerhardt, the son of Floyd Gerhardt, matriarch of the Gerhardt crime family. During this time, Minnesota state trooper Lou Solverson, and Rock County sheriff Hank Larsson, investigate three homicides linked to Rye. In the episode, Ed and Peggy flee from Hanzee, who is in turn being pursued by the police after the motel massacre.

According to Nielsen Media Research, the episode was seen by an estimated 1.82 million household viewers and gained a 0.5 ratings share among adults aged 18–49, making it the most watched episode of the season. The episode received critical acclaim, with critics praising the closure, writing, directing, performances, pacing and references to the first season.

== Plot ==
With her condition worsening, Betsy (Cristin Milioti) narrates how she feels her family's life will go on after her death. She views the world changing through the years and how Lou (Patrick Wilson) grows up with Molly. She also sees a vision where an older Lou (Keith Carradine) visits a fully grown up Molly (Allison Tolman), her husband Gus Grimly (Colin Hanks) and her step-daughter Greta (Joey King), also revealing that Molly and Gus had a son together.

After the massacre at the motel, Ed (Jesse Plemons) and Peggy (Kirsten Dunst) flee from Hanzee (Zahn McClarnon), who shoots Ed in the back. They make their way through a supermarket and lock themselves in a meat locker. Wounded and heavily bleeding, Ed laments that their relationship won't make it through this. Meanwhile, Milligan (Bokeem Woodbine) arrives at the Gerhardt house and allows the maid to leave with the family car and money. Ricky G (Ryan O'Nan) shows up at the farm, intending to rob the money but is ambushed by Milligan and Gale Kitchen (Brad Mann). Ricky tries to reach his gun but is quickly shot by Gale and left to bleed.

Hanzee reaches the locker, which has been locked from the inside with a knife sharpening steel. As smoke starts getting into the locker due to a fire he created, Peggy tries to calm herself until she realizes that Ed has lost consciousness. She then pulls out the icepick, intending to fight Hanzee. She opens the door, only to discover Lou and Schmidt (Keir O'Donnell). The smoke was a product of a mental breakdown that mirrored a movie she previously watched in the cabin; Hanzee never entered the supermarket but Ed died from his blood loss. Peggy is then arrested and driven to Minnesota by Lou.

In Bismarck, North Dakota, with the police looking for him, Hanzee meets with a handler at a park. The handler gives him a new identity as "Tripoli", (Note: Previously seen in the first season, portrayed by Mark Acheson.) also intending to get plastic surgery to avoid recognition and start a new organization to fight Kansas City. He then saves two kids (Note: Identified as young Mr. Wrench and Mr. Numbers.) from bullies. Milligan meets with his boss, Hamish Broker (Adam Arkin), who is impressed by his actions. He is then promoted, but working as part of the accounting department in a small office, much to his chagrin.

Hank (Ted Danson) visits Lou and Betsy for dinner, with both Hank and Lou questioning how to even report the UFO. When Betsy questions him about the strange symbol drawings in his study room, Hank claims that it was used as a universal language, which helped him after his wife died. The episode ends as the family goes to sleep.

== Production ==
=== Development ===
In November 2015, it was reported that the tenth and final episode of the second season would be titled "Palindrome", and was to be directed by Adam Arkin and written by series creator Noah Hawley. This was Hawley's 16th writing credit, and Arkin's second directing credit.

=== Writing ===
The episode made many references to the first season, including a guest appearance by Keith Carradine, Allison Tolman, Colin Hanks and Joey King as their respective characters, the appearance of Mr. Wrench and Mr. Numbers as children, and the reveal that Hanzee Dent would become Moses Tripoli.

== Reception ==
=== Viewers ===
In its original American broadcast, "Palindrome" was seen by an estimated 1.82 million household viewers and gained a 0.5 ratings share among adults aged 18–49, according to Nielsen Media Research. This means that 0.5 percent of all households with televisions watched the episode. This was a 38% increase in viewership from the previous episode, which was watched by 1.31 million viewers with a 0.4 in the 18-49 demographics.

=== Critical reviews ===
"Palindrome" received critical acclaim. The review aggregator website Rotten Tomatoes reported a 100% approval rating with an average rating of 9.3/10 for the episode, based on 24 reviews. The site's consensus states: "With 'Palindrome', Fargo finishes its excellent second season with quiet beauty, resisting the urge to neatly tie up every detail in favor of a more artistic ending."

Terri Schwartz of IGN gave the episode an "amazing" 9.8 out of 10 and wrote in her verdict, "Fargo delivered a more than satisfactory conclusion to what has been a phenomenal season of television, opting for a more quiet finale that offers mostly bittersweet looks into the lives of its surviving characters. Though it didn't tie every loose end up tightly, the stories it did tell were beautiful and well-crafted, and as fantastically shot, edited, written, directed, framed, colored and acted as everything else in Season 2."

Zack Handlen of The A.V. Club gave the episode an "A" grade and wrote, "There has been considerable change over these past few weeks, and the final episode finds everyone, if not in a definitive place, at least in one that makes sense for them as an ending."

Alan Sepinwall of HitFix wrote, "With all the hype the first season gave Sioux Falls, and with the very high creative bar that season set, it would have been easy for season 2 to fall short. Instead, it soared." Ben Travers of IndieWire gave the episode a "B-" grade and wrote, "Fargo Season 2 felt incomplete in the end; a notion I would've thought impossible given its prequel positioning. Perhaps we'll find out more in Season 3." Richard Vine of The Guardian wrote, "There's no doubt Fargo's second season has been a sophisticated piece of television, warm, funny, dark and thrilling - it's a joy to watch, from the acting to the split screen cinematography, the excellent soundtrack and lines."

Kevin P. Sullivan of Entertainment Weekly wrote, "Wow. That was an ending — so full of thematic and emotional moments that landed powerfully, yet delicately. The finale was bloody brilliant and morally right, loud, quiet, and deep." Brian Tallerico of Vulture gave the episode a perfect 5 star rating out of 5 and wrote, "Television is a writer's medium. The production details on Fargo are terrific, and the show boasts one of the year's best ensembles, but in this incredible season finale, it all comes down to the writing." Scott Tobias of The New York Times wrote, "The philosophizing throughout 'Palindrome' is touching in its own way, a necessary counterbalance to a season where the bodies piled up by the dozen."

Libby Hill of Los Angeles Times wrote, "By the waning moments of 'Palindrome', the Fargo second season finale, it's evident that sometimes it's less about speaking your piece and more about being understood once you do." Caralynn Lippo of TV Fanatic gave the episode a 4.9 star rating out of 5 and wrote, "'Palindrome' was a lovely and low-key ending to Fargo Season 2. It provided a great amount of closure on all the major plot points, while refusing the typical narrative tendency to wrap everything up cleanly and as expected." Amy Amatangelo of Paste gave the episode a 9.7 rating out of 10 and wrote, "It was truly an amazing season with some knockout performances. It should turn Bokeem Woodbine into a household name and open up a whole new career for Kirsten Dunst. For all the blood and terror, Fargo remains a surprisingly optimistic show —o nce again, ending with a scene of a happy home life. Okay then — on to season three."

Despite praising the episode, Joanna Robinson of Vanity Fair criticized the callbacks to the first season, particularly the reveal that Hanzee Dent would become Moses Tripoli. She wrote, "Though you may raise an eyebrow at the lengths Fargo went to in order to tie its two seasons together with a bow, you have to admire the consistency of the theme and the cerebral ambition of creator Noah Hawley."
