= Before the Law (Fargo) =

- Fargo episode
- Episode no.: Season 2 Episode 2
- Directed by: Noah Hawley
- Written by: Noah Hawley
- Production code: XFO02002
- Original air date: October 19, 2015
- Running time: 62 minutes

Guest appearances
- Cristin Milioti as Betsy Solverson; Jeffrey Donovan as Dodd Gerhardt; Bokeem Woodbine as Mike Milligan; Brad Garrett as Joe Bulo; Mike Bradecich as Skip Sprang; Nick Offerman as Karl Weathers; Kieran Culkin as Rye Gerhardt

Episode chronology
← Previous "Waiting for Dutch"	Next → "The Myth of Sisyphus"
- Fargo season 2

"Before the Law" is the second episode of the second season of the FX anthology series Fargo, and the twelfth episode of the series overall. It was written and directed by series creator and showrunner Noah Hawley. The title refers to the short story of the same name by Franz Kafka.

The episode first aired on October 19, 2015, and was seen by 0.96 million viewers. It received acclaim from critics, who praised its writing, acting, and pace.

== Plot ==
Joe Bulo (Brad Garrett), Mike Milligan (Bokeem Woodbine) and two Kitchen brothers of the Kansas City syndicate arrive at the Gerhardt residence. Bulo offers Floyd Gerhardt (Jean Smart) a buyout of her family's operation but would allow them to run it. Afterwards, Floyd tells her sons about the meeting. Dodd bristles at his mother running the business, but acquiesces when she expresses her intent of him taking over once the current situation settles. She then demands Rye be found. Milligan and the Kitchens also begin searching for Rye.

In Luverne, Peggy (Kirsten Dunst) resumes work at the beauty salon while Ed stays home to clean up the garage and bundle up Rye's corpse to take to the butcher shop. While driving his family into town, Lou stops by the crime scene where Betsy finds Rye's gun in some weeds. Lou observes Milligan and the Kitchens driving past the diner. Hank Larsson (Ted Danson) later pulls over Milligan and the Kitchens, but lets them go after a brief conversation.

Later that night, Lou sees a light on inside the closed butcher shop and finds Ed there. Lou asks to buy some bacon, while Ed does his best to distract Lou from seeing Rye's remains in a meat grinder. Lou eventually leaves unaware of what was really happening, and Ed finishes grinding Rye's body while strange flashing lights illuminate the exterior of the butcher shop.

== Production ==
The music for the episode was provided by series composer Jeff Russo.

== Reception ==
=== Ratings ===
The episode first aired in the United States on FX on October 19, 2015 and obtained 0.94 million viewers.

=== Critical reception ===
"Before the Law" received critical acclaim. It currently holds a perfect 100% rating on Rotten Tomatoes: the critical consensus is ""Before the Law" successfully juxtaposes Fargo's sweeping cinematography with intimate character studies that build tension between the various storylines."

In a highly positive review, Terri Schwartz of IGN gave the episode a 9.2 rating out of 10, concluding that "Fargo delivered another excellent episode with "Before the Law," which focused more on increasing the tension than world-building. This isn't a show to waste screentime, so hopefully the pause to assess the damage after the events of the premiere pays off in episode 3."
