= Waiting for Dutch =

- Fargo episode
- Episode no.: Season 2 Episode 1
- Directed by: Michael Uppendahl; Randall Einhorn
- Written by: Noah Hawley
- Editing by: Skip Macdonald
- Production code: XFO02001
- Original air date: October 12, 2015
- Running time: 53 minutes

Guest appearances
- Cristin Milioti as Betsy Solverson; Jeffrey Donovan as Dodd Gerhardt; Bokeem Woodbine as Mike Milligan; Brad Garrett as Joe Bulo; Mike Bradecich as Skip Sprang; Nick Offerman as Karl Weathers; Kieran Culkin as Rye Gerhardt; Ann Cusack as Judge Mundt; Michael Hogan as Otto Gerhardt; Zahn McClarnon as Hanzee Dent; Angus Sampson as Bear Gerhardt

Episode chronology
| ← Previous "Morton's Fork" | Next → "Before the Law" |
- Fargo (season 2)

"Waiting for Dutch" is the premiere episode of the second season of the FX anthology series Fargo, and the eleventh episode of the series overall. It was written by series creator and showrunner Noah Hawley and directed by Michael Uppendahl and Randall Einhorn, making it the only episode in the series with two directors. The title refers to the Samuel Beckett play Waiting for Godot, and to Ronald Reagan, occasionally nicknamed "Dutch", who appears via archival footage.

As each season of Fargo follows its own self-contained narrative, "Waiting for Dutch", set in 1979, introduces a new storyline and cast, along with many new characters: in the episode, Rye Gerhardt (Kieran Culkin), the youngest son of Otto Gerhardt (Michael Hogan), the head of the Gerhardt mafia dynasty, who rules over Fargo, North Dakota, attempts to threaten a tenacious judge (Ann Cusack) for financial gain while in Luverne, Minnesota; their face-off triggers a suite of events that will forever impact the lives of the Gerhardt family and the people of Luverne.

The episode was first aired on October 12, 2015, and was seen by 1.59 million viewers. It received considerable acclaim from critics, who praised its writing, acting, and new set of characters, and considered it equally good, if not superior, to season one opener "The Crocodile's Dilemma"; they also noted that the episode seemed to give the new season a different tone, with a bigger scale and more characters, while the episode's themes and characters were considered a fitting addition to the universe of the original film and the works of the Coen brothers. It received three Primetime Emmy Award nominations, winning Outstanding Cinematography for a Limited Series or Movie for cinematographer Dana Gonzales.

== Plot ==
In March 1979, the Gerhardt crime family, led by unrelenting family patriarch Otto Gerhardt, controls trucking and distribution from Fargo, North Dakota. Otto has three living sons, the oldest being the fierce and ambitious Dodd (Jeffrey Donovan), followed by the calm and impassive Bear (Angus Sampson), and the indignant and impulsive Rye (Kieran Culkin) who works as a bag man collecting debts for the family.

The family's hierarchy, together with the entire fate of Fargo, becomes uncertain when Otto suffers a sudden stroke. Unaware of this event, Rye follows Judge Irma Mundt to a breakfast diner in Luverne, Minnesota, and tries to intimidate her into unfreezing the accounts of typewriter salesman Skip Sprang, a cash-strapped Gerhardt debtor. However, Mundt is quickly annoyed by his threats, ultimately spraying him with bug spray to make him leave; Rye impulsively shoots the judge in response, before also killing the cook and the waitress. In front of the diner, Rye witnesses the apparition of an unidentified flying object before being hit by a car. After a moment, the driver of the car simply drives on with Rye's body lodged in the windshield.

Minnesota state trooper Lou Solverson (Patrick Wilson) receives a call reporting the shooting and investigates with his father-in-law, Sheriff Hank Larsson (Ted Danson). They notice skid marks, a car not belonging to any of the victims (Rye's) and a bloodied bill outside in the snow. The pair deduce that the car belongs to the killer, assuming he came to rob the diner and left in another car, although they do not understand why. They eventually notice a shoe up in a nearby tree (a result of Rye being hit by the car). Lou comes home to his beloved wife Betsy (Cristin Milioti) and their daughter Molly. Betsy has cancer; Lou refuses to discuss the issue on most occasions, even with his father-in-law, and acts vague and unrealistically optimistic about her future when he does.

Meanwhile, Ed Blumquist (Jesse Plemons), the local butcher's assistant in Luverne, comes home to his wife, hairdresser Peggy Blumquist (Kirsten Dunst). Everything seems normal during dinner until Ed, following strange noises from the garage, finds their car with a huge hole in its windshield. He soon finds Rye, badly injured but still alive. Having seemingly lost his mind, Rye attacks Ed, forcing Ed to kill him in self-defense with a gardening tool. Peggy explains that she hit Rye with her car by mistake and convinces a confused Ed that if they tell the police, their lives will be ruined. They hide the body in their freezer.

In Kansas City, Missouri, the local mafia looks to expand up north, particularly by absorbing the Gerhardt dynasty and therefore gaining control over Fargo and its surroundings. Having heard of Otto's stroke, which leaves his wife Floyd (Jean Smart) and their sons dealing with a power vacuum, mobster Joe Bulo proposes that Kansas City move aggressively by acquiring or absorbing the dynasty as a part of them, or by, if needed, killing all of the Gerhardts. The decision is approved.

== Production ==
The music for the episode was provided by series composer Jeff Russo. The opening scene also features the main theme of the 1996 film, composed by Carter Burwell. The traditional song "Didn't Leave Nobody but the Baby" is played during the end credits, in reference to the Coens' film O Brother, Where Art Thou?, in which it was also featured.

== Reception ==
=== Ratings ===
The episode was first aired in the US on FX on June 17, 2014 and obtained 1.59 million viewers.

=== Critical reception ===
"Waiting for Dutch" received critical acclaim. It was applauded for the season's early storylines and character development, as well as for its performances, especially from Kirsten Dunst, Patrick Wilson, Ted Danson, and guests Jeffrey Donovan, Nick Offerman, and Kieran Culkin. It currently holds a perfect 100% rating on Rotten Tomatoes: the critical consensus is "'Waiting for Dutch' sets up a promising second installment of the Fargo anthology with a new cast of compelling characters and enough callbacks to reward existing fans."

Ben Travers of IndieWire gave the episode an "A" rating, highly praising the writing and performances, especially from Offerman and Dunst, stating "It's a coy play on a fictitious tale that still manages to feel real, despite some truly oddball antics and extreme scenarios. That authenticity carved out of a mad world is what we were looking for... and it's exactly what was delivered tonight." Sean T Collins of the New York Observer gave a similarly positive review, stating "Not only does the show have to maintain that level of care and quality, it must do so with no Billy Bob, no Bilbo Baggins, and no out-of-nowhere star turn from Allison Tolman [...] this was a surefooted hour of television, more in control of itself the more out of control things got."

In a highly positive review, Terri Schwartz of IGN gave the episode a 9.5 rating out of 10, concluding that "Season 2 improves upon everything that works in Season 1 to deliver a funnier, tighter and stronger new story with a great cast and fantastic crew. The series never takes itself too seriously and isn't afraid to have a little fun. Oozing with confidence, the Season 2 premiere kicks off what is sure to be a great new year of Fargo." He also stated that "despite such a robust cast of characters, Hawley never lets the storylines feel unwieldy. It's his writing that holds this series together, and it's clear he's spent plenty of time reevaluating the winning formula of Season 1 to put together an even stronger project here."

Michael Hogan of The Daily Telegraph gave a positive review, finding it "promising" and stating "Performances were universally excellent. Dunst and Danson were terrific but outshone by Wilson, who was winningly phlegmatic and wearily wise." Brittany Volk of the Tampa Bay Times commented that "Noah Hawley delivered a fantastic first episode that sets a warm tone, with a bite of darkness. Okay, a whole mouthful."

Scott Tobis of ArtsBeat gave a positive review, stating "'Waiting for Dutch' proves thrillingly adept at establishing the players in its byzantine plot [...] We get a sense of all the major players as individuals, but there are larger forces at play, too, particularly in the dust-up between the Gerhardts and the Kansas City mob, which Mr. Hawley stages as something like a corporate behemoth encroaching on a locally owned business." Caralynn Lippo of TV Fanatic called it "an incredible season premiere that put to rest any concerns that the series would not be able to live up to the nearly flawless [first season]. [...] For how large and sprawling the ensemble is, this premiere didn't tend to feel overwhelming and managed to give a solid feel for each."

=== Analysis ===
The episode's themes and characters were positively compared to those of the original Fargo film, and of the works of the Coen brothers in general.

Kevin P. Sullivan of Entertainment Weekly favorably compared the themes of the episode to the work of the Coens, in particular Fargo and A Serious Man: "Even though Fargo has left behind the more superficial trappings that tied it to the original film, the diner scene is where we see the Coen color rise to the surface again. Scott Tobis of ArtsBeat stated "For as much as Fargo the TV show gets some distance from the Coens, Mr. Hawley seems determined to pay homage to the film with more than just callbacks. [...] Like the first season, and Fargo the movie, the little guys stand to be crushed in the fight. For the Solversons, that means an investigation that puts Lou and Hank at risk while Lou’s wife, Betsy (Cristin Milioti), is weakened by cancer treatments. For the Blomquists, that means the extra misfortune of a hit-and-run cover-up on a person of great interest for all parties — the cops, the Gerhardts and the Kansas City mob."

In the episode, Judge Mundt tells Rye Gerhardt the story of Job, the central character of the Book of Job in the Bible. Commenting on this, Sullivan said that "One element of the Coens’ signature character work has been finding the bitter humor in Job-like stories, tales of men and women who are tested by either the world around them or their own incompetence. Seeing the story appear in the season 2 premiere signals a dedication to a type of storytelling."

Events in the story were inspired by the real-life murder of Gregory Glenn Biggs.
