= Fargo season 2 =

2015 season of American crime anthology TV series

Fargo
- Season 2
- Promotional poster
- Starring: Kirsten Dunst; Patrick Wilson; Jesse Plemons; Jean Smart; Ted Danson
- No. of episodes: 10

Release
- Original network: FX
- Original release: October 12 – December 14, 2015

Season chronology
- ← Previous; Season 1 Next → Season 3

The second season of the American black comedy crime drama television series Fargo, billed as Fargo: Year Two and Fargo: Installment 2, aired on FX from October 12 to December 14, 2015, totaling ten episodes. The series is an anthology about violent crime in the American Midwest, with each season acting as a self-contained story within the show's shared continuity. A prequel to the first season set in March 1979, Year Two centers around a married couple—Peggy and Ed Blumquist—trying to cover up the murder of a local crime family scion, which kickstarts an investigation by Minnesota state trooper Lou Solverson and a bloody gang war.

The season was produced by FX Productions and MGM Television, with Noah Hawley serving as showrunner. Hawley and the writers sought to expand the scope of Fargo's storytelling in the characters and subject matter, as well as the more turbulent setting. Filming began in Calgary, Alberta in January 2015 and ended after 85 days. The principal cast of the season features Kirsten Dunst, Patrick Wilson, Jesse Plemons, Jean Smart, and Ted Danson. Its ensemble also includes Cristin Milioti, Jeffrey Donovan, Zahn McClarnon, Bokeem Woodbine, Angus Sampson, Brad Garrett, Nick Offerman, Rachel Keller, and Keir O'Donnell in recurring roles.

Year Two received widespread acclaim from critics and audiences for its writing, directing, cinematography, editing, and the performances of Dunst, Wilson, and Plemons. The season received various accolades, including 18 nominations and 2 wins at the 68th Primetime Emmy Awards, 3 nominations at the 73rd Golden Globe Awards, and 4 wins at the 21st Critics' Choice Awards.

== Cast ==
=== Main ===
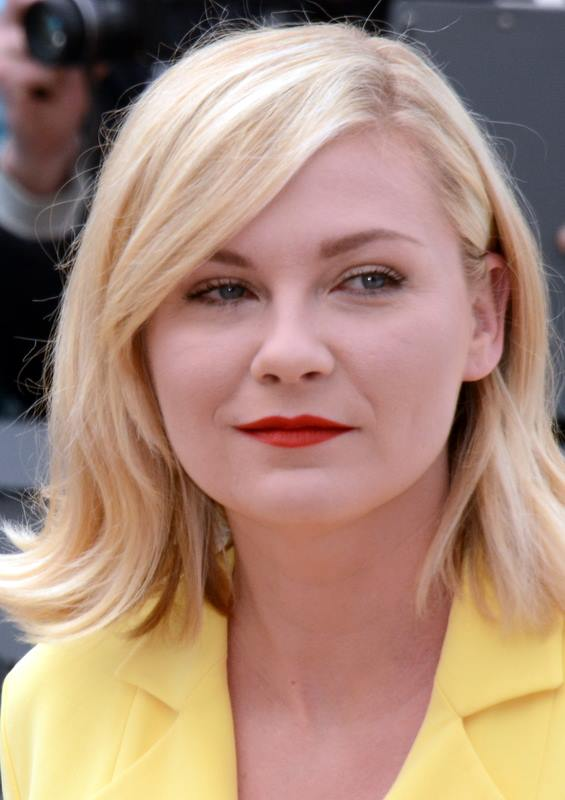
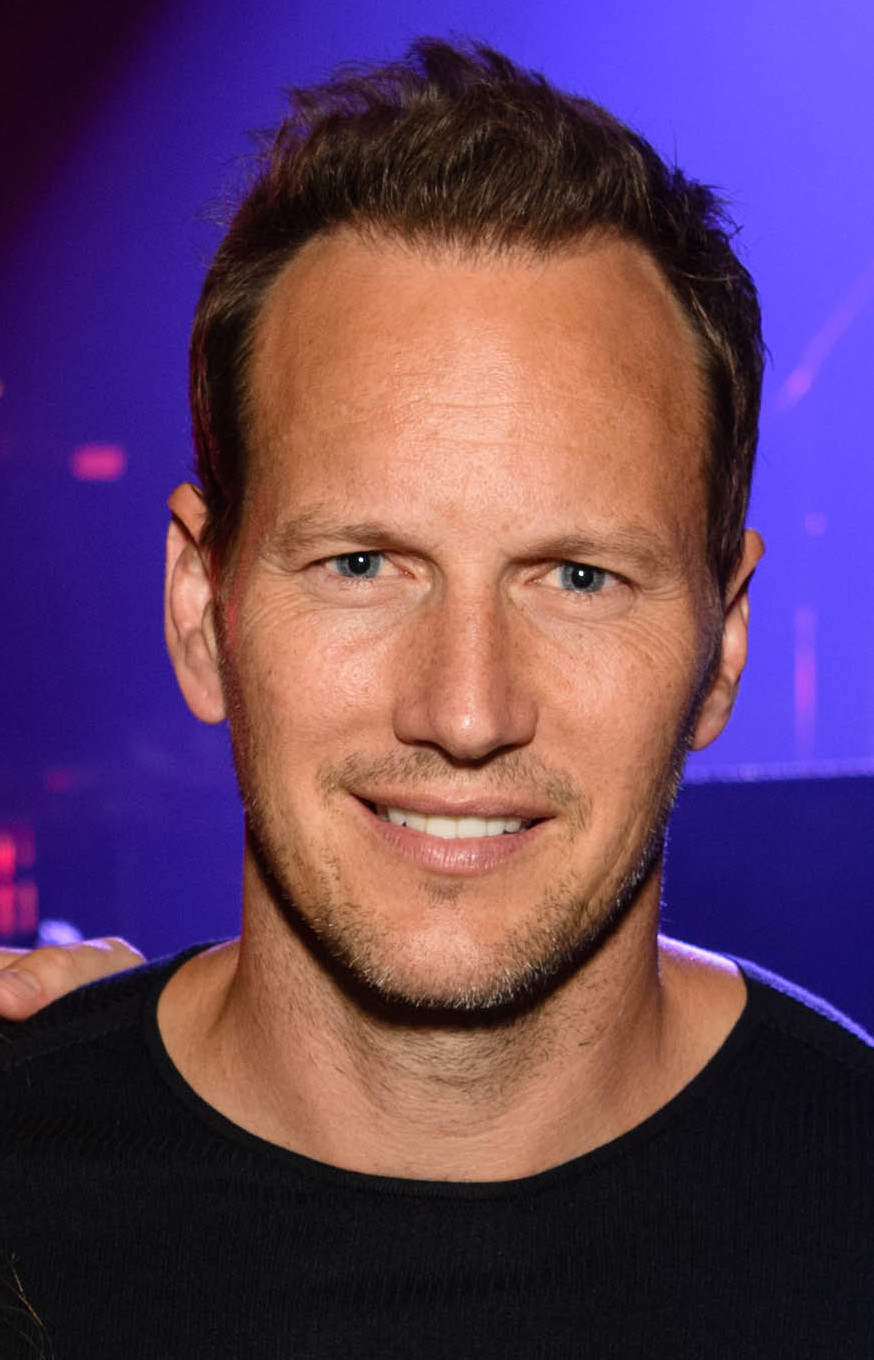
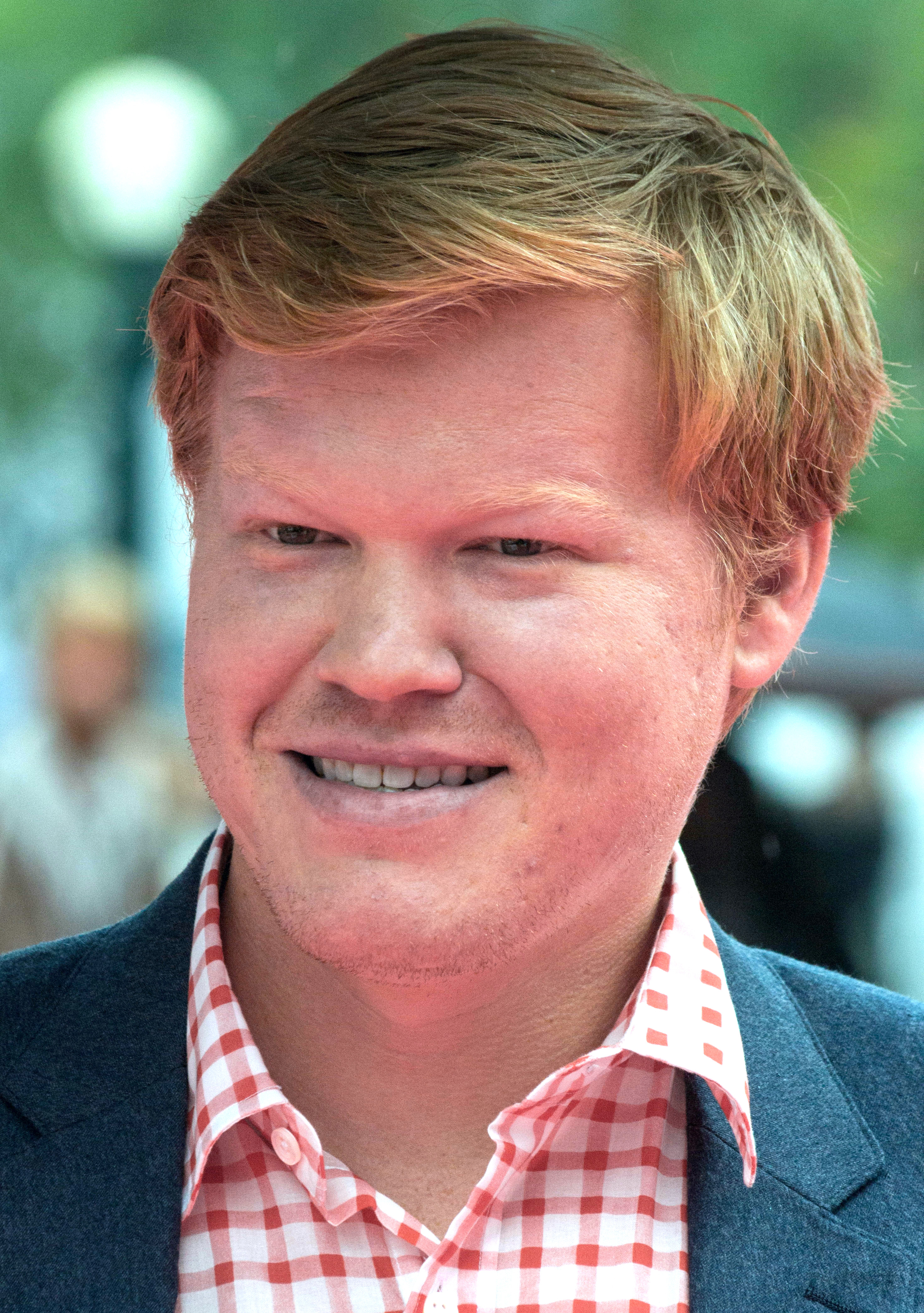
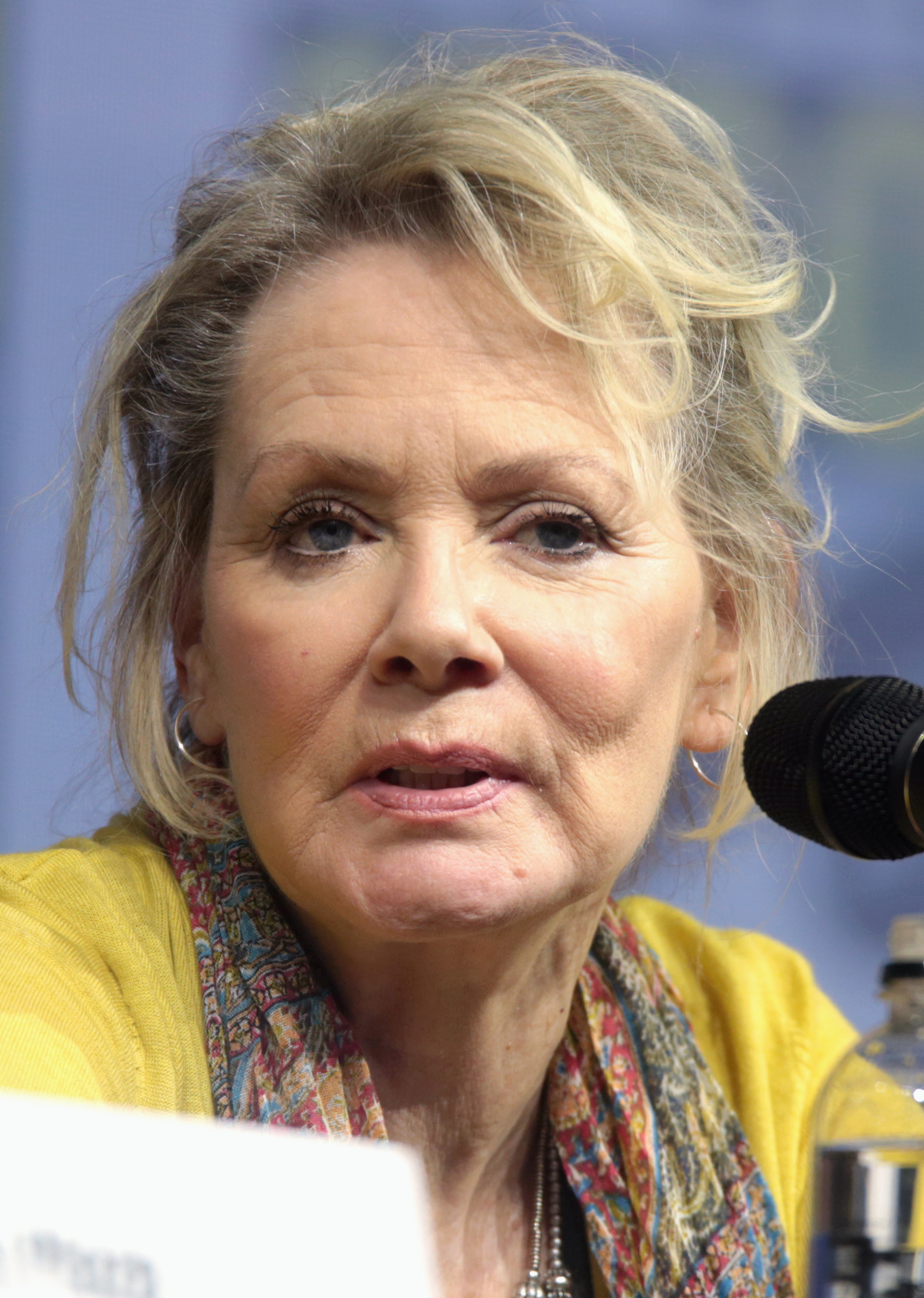
(Left to right) Kirsten Dunst (pictured in 2016), Patrick Wilson (2018), Jesse Plemons (2015), and Jean Smart (2018)
- Kirsten Dunst as Peggy Blumquist, a hairdresser focused on improving herself through self-actualization and pop psychology techniques.
- Patrick Wilson as Lou Solverson, a Minnesota State Patrol trooper and the father of Molly Solverson, one of the main characters of the first season. Keith Carradine portrayed the older version of the character in the first season.
- Jesse Plemons as Ed Blumquist, Peggy's husband and the local butcher's assistant.
- Jean Smart as Floyd Gerhardt, wife of Otto Gerhardt, the head of Fargo's most prominent organized crime syndicate. After her husband suffers a debilitating stroke, she finds herself having to lead the Gerhardt dynasty and deal with her three living sons, each of whom is vying to replace their father.
- Ted Danson as Hank Larsson, the sheriff of Rock County, Minnesota, Lou's father-in-law, Betsy's father, and Molly Solverson's maternal grandfather.

=== Recurring ===
- Cristin Milioti as Betsy Solverson, Lou's wife, suffering from cancer.
- Jeffrey Donovan as Dodd Gerhardt, the oldest of the three Gerhardt brothers.
- Zahn McClarnon as Hanzee Dent, a Native American veteran of the Vietnam War who works as Dodd's enforcer.
- Bokeem Woodbine as Mike Milligan, a charismatic member of the Kansas City crime family, sent to deal with the Gerhardt family.
- Angus Sampson as Bear Gerhardt, younger brother of Dodd and older brother of Rye.
- Brad Garrett as Joe Bulo, a senior representative of the Kansas City crime family to supervise the negotiations and potential elimination of the Gerhardt family.
- Nick Offerman as Karl Weathers, the only lawyer of the town.
- Michael Hogan as Otto Gerhardt, Floyd's husband and the Gerhardt family patriarch, who suffers a stroke.
- Rachel Keller as Simone Gerhardt, Dodd's rebellious daughter.
- Adam Arkin as Hamish Broker, a senior executive at the Kansas City mafia.
- Raven Stewart as Molly Solverson, Lou's six-year-old daughter. She is played by Allison Tolman in season 1, where she is shown to be a deputy in the Bemidji police department.
- Emily Haine as Noreen Vanderslice, a young woman working at Ed's butcher shop and an avid reader of Albert Camus.
- Daniel Beirne as Sonny Greer, a mechanic and friend of Weathers.
- Brad and Todd Mann as Gale and Wayne Kitchen, Milligan's twin enforcers.
- Elizabeth Marvel as Constance Heck, Peggy's coworker at the hair salon, who shares her interest in self-help literature.
- Allan Dobrescu as Charlie Gerhardt, Bear's teenage son who has mild cerebral palsy.
- Keir O'Donnell as Ben Schmidt, a Fargo police detective with whom Lou is forced to work. He is played by Peter Breitmayer in season 1, where he is shown to be a senior lieutenant in the Duluth police department.
- Terry Kinney as Chief Gibson, an officer in the South Dakota Highway Patrol.
- Bruce Campbell as Ronald Reagan
- Ann Cusack as Judge Irma Mundt, a judge whom Rye attempts to coerce into unfreezing his business partner's assets.
- Mike Bradecich as Skip Sprang, the hapless owner of a typewriter shop and Rye's business partner.
- Greg Bryk as Virgil Bauer, one of Dodd's trusted henchmen.
- Bob Bainborough as Maynard Oltorf, a convenience store clerk.

=== Special guests ===
- Kieran Culkin as Rye Gerhardt, the youngest of the three Gerhardt brothers.
- Martin Freeman as Narrator
- Allison Tolman as older Molly Solverson
- Joey King as Greta Grimly, Molly's stepdaughter, reprising her role from season one.
- Colin Hanks as Gus Grimly, Molly's husband, reprising his role from season one.
- Keith Carradine as older Lou Solverson, reprising his role from season one.

== Episodes ==
No. overall	No. in season	Title	Directed by	Written by	Original release date	Prod. code	U.S. viewers (millions)
11	1	"Waiting for Dutch"	Michael Uppendahl; Randall Einhorn	Noah Hawley	October 12, 2015	XFO02001	1.59
In March of 1979, Otto Gerhardt, patriarch of the Gerhardt crime family in Fargo, North Dakota, is incapacitated by a stroke, potentially jeopardizing their dynasty's leadership and sending two of his sons, Dodd and Bear, into a power struggle. At a Waffle Hut near Luverne, Minnesota, Otto's third son Rye attempts to extort a judge into unfreezing the assets of his business partner Skip Sprang, but ends up murdering her and two restaurant employees. Wounded, he sees an apparent UFO and stumbles into the road, only to be struck by a passing car. The driver, beautician Peggy Blumquist, assumes Rye to be dead and hides him in her garage. Her husband Ed, a butcher, discovers Rye alive and stabs him to death after being attacked. The two elect to keep the incident a secret and hide the corpse in their meat freezer. State trooper Lou Solverson and Sheriff Hank Larsson (Lou's father-in-law) begin investigating the diner murders. At home, Lou tends for his cancer-stricken wife Betsy and their daughter Molly. In light of Otto's stroke, members of a Kansas City-based syndicate make plans to move on Fargo.
12	2	"Before the Law"	Noah Hawley	Noah Hawley	October 19, 2015	XFO02002	0.96
Otto's wife Floyd is approached by Joe Bulo of the Kansas City mafia, who offers her a buyout of her family operation that keeps the Gerhardts' leadership intact. Dodd bristles at his mother running the business, but acquiesces when Floyd names him her successor after the situation settles. Floyd demands Rye be found. Bulo's associates Mike Milligan and the twin Kitchen brothers also begin searching for Rye. While driving into town, Lou stops by the Waffle Hut crime scene, where Betsy finds Rye's gun. That night, Lou stops by Ed's butcher shop to buy bacon, unaware that Ed is disposing of Rye's body in the meat grinder.
13	3	"The Myth of Sisyphus"	Michael Uppendahl	Bob DeLaurentis	October 26, 2015	XFO02003	1.21
The police begin searching for Rye after his fingerprints are identified on the gun from the Waffle Hut; Milligan, Dodd, and the latter's henchman Hanzee independently search for Rye themselves. At the beauty salon, Betsy speculates to Hank (her father) that Rye is the victim of a hit-and-run. Peggy overhears this, and convinces Ed to crash her car a second time to hide evidence of Rye's murder. Lou travels to Fargo, where he and Detective Ben Schmidt travel to the Gerhardt farm and have a tense encounter with Floyd and her sons. Lou then visits Skip's typewriter store, where he has a standoff with Milligan and the Kitchen brothers. Dodd's rebellious daughter Simone points Hanzee to Skip, who is brought to Dodd for interrogation. After determining that Skip has no information on Rye's whereabouts, Dodd has Skip buried alive, then directs Hanzee to look for Rye in Luverne.
14	4	"Fear and Trembling"	Michael Uppendahl	Steve Blackman	November 2, 2015	XFO02004	1.28
As Otto is being taken to a doctor's appointment, Simone has sex with Milligan, inadvertently mentioning the doctor visit. The Kitchens then eliminate Otto's guards in the parking lot outside the medical clinic, leaving Otto unharmed, but unguarded. Meanwhile, Floyd, Dodd, and Bear meet with Bulo and propose a counter-offer to his buyout in the form of a partnership. Bulo balks at the idea, since Dodd assaulted two of his men earlier that same day. Bulo phones his superiors, who reject the Gerhardts' proposal. They now offer two million dollars less than the first offer and demand the Gerhardts' complete surrender. In Luverne, Hanzee's investigation leads him to find Rye's belt buckle in the Blumquist fireplace. Lou talks to the Blumquists regarding his suspicions that they are involved in Rye's death, but they stubbornly refuse to cooperate. He warns them of the Gerhardts' violent history. At the Gerhardt farm, Floyd tells the family to prepare for war.
15	5	"The Gift of the Magi"	Jeffrey Reiner	Matt Wolpert & Ben Nedivi	November 9, 2015	XFO02005	1.13
Lou is temporarily taken off the Waffle Hut murder case while working a security detail for presidential candidate Ronald Reagan. Dodd and Hanzee concoct a story characterizing Ed as a hitman called "The Butcher" hired by Kansas City to kill Rye, in an attempt to rile Floyd into waging war. On Floyd's orders, Hanzee kills Bulo and a Kitchen brother, and sends the former's head to Milligan. Milligan later threatens Simone into spying on her family for him. Dodd sends his henchman Virgil to kill Ed, accompanied by Bear's naive son Charlie. Peggy heeds Lou's warning and plans to leave for California, but Ed insists on staying. Peggy ultimately sells her car to get the down payment to purchase the butcher shop. The assassination attempt on Ed ends with Virgil dead, Charlie hospitalized, and the butcher shop ablaze. Ed returns home and decides to leave town with Peggy, only to learn she sold their car. The police arrive on the Blumquists' doorstep.
16	6	"Rhinoceros"	Jeffrey Reiner	Noah Hawley	November 16, 2015	XFO02006	1.15
Ed is arrested and brought to the police station for questioning, while Hank interrogates Peggy at her house. Floyd demands "The Butcher" executed and Charlie released from jail; Dodd and his men go to the Blumquists' in search of Ed, while Bear fetches for Charlie. Hanzee knocks out Hank, but Peggy subdues Dodd in her basement using a cattle prod. Karl Weathers, Luverne's only attorney, is summoned to the station to represent Ed. Bear and his men arrive soon after; realizing Ed will be killed, Lou sneaks him out a rear window while Weathers convinces Bear to leave. Hank drives back into town and intercepts Lou and Ed, but Ed runs off, with Hanzee in pursuit. While the Gerhardts depart, Simone calls Milligan and asks him to murder her father as revenge for Dodd's abuse. Milligan and his men arrive at the Gerhardt farm and open fire with Simone, Floyd, and Otto inside.
17	7	"Did You Do This? No, You Did It!"	Keith Gordon	Noah Hawley and Matt Wolpert & Ben Nedivi	November 23, 2015	XFO02007	1.24
Otto is killed in Milligan's raid on the farm, escalating the war between Fargo and Kansas City. Lou and Ben arrive after Otto's funeral and take Floyd to the station for questioning. She eventually accepts a deal that absolves her family for their past crimes in exchange for information on the inner workings of the Kansas City drug operation. Bear drives Simone to a secluded forest and shoots her for betraying the family. Lou asks Weathers to keep an eye on his family; Betsy claims to Weathers she has received placebo pills for her treatments, and wants Weathers to look after her family after she is gone. Betsy later goes to her father's house to feed his cat, but discovers his office filled with strange drawings and symbols. Milligan's superiors call him to inform him that an "Undertaker" has been sent to take over his end of the operation; when he arrives, Milligan kills him and his men, intending to blame the murder on the Gerhardts. He then receives a call from Ed, who says he has Dodd hostage in his trunk.
18	8	"Loplop"	Keith Gordon	Bob DeLaurentis	November 30, 2015	XFO02008	1.32
Ed rushes back home; he and Peggy put Dodd in the trunk of his car and hide out in a relative's hunting cabin in South Dakota, unaware that Hanzee is pursuing them. At a gas station, Ed makes several unsuccessful phone calls to the Gerhardts to bargain for Dodd's freedom. He finally comes to an agreement with Milligan, and prepares to meet him at a motel in Sioux Falls the next morning. However, Dodd gets loose, incapacitates Peggy, and hangs Ed; Peggy knocks Dodd unconscious in time to save her husband. A manhunt ensues for Hanzee after he shoots five individuals at a bar; he finds Peggy's coworker Constance and forces her to trick Peggy into revealing her whereabouts over the phone, to no avail. A gas station attendant calls the police after he recognizes Hanzee in his shop. Hanzee finds the cabin, shoots Dodd in the head, and asks Peggy for a haircut. Peggy stabs Hanzee in the back as Lou and Hank arrive, forcing Hanzee to flee.
19	9	"The Castle"	Adam Arkin	Noah Hawley and Steve Blackman	December 7, 2015	XFO02009	1.31
Lou and Hank call in the South Dakota Highway Patrol after recapturing the Blumquists. The Patrol's Captain Cheney hatches a reckless plan for Ed and Peggy to wear a wire to the meeting with Milligan. Lou strongly opposes the idea, prompting Cheney to have him escorted out of the state while Hank stays behind. The Blumquists agree to the plan in exchange for lesser charges, and the police set up an ambush at the motel. Hanzee lies to Floyd and Bear that Dodd is being held in the motel by the Kansas City mob. Lou stops at the gas station to call home, unaware that Betsy has collapsed, and discovers that Hanzee has killed the attendant. He rushes to warn the others, but arrives to find the Gerhardts in a shootout with Cheney's team. All but Ben and a wounded Hank are killed; Floyd realizes Hanzee's deception before he stabs her to death. Bear attempts to strangle Lou, but a UFO suddenly appears above the motel, allowing Lou to shoot a distracted Bear. The Blumquists flee with Hanzee in pursuit, while police reinforcements arrive.
20	10	"Palindrome"	Adam Arkin	Noah Hawley	December 14, 2015	XFO02010	1.82
Hanzee shoots Ed while he and Peggy flee. The two take shelter in the meat locker of a supermarket. Ed eventually succumbs to his blood loss, causing Peggy to have a mental breakdown and hallucinate that Hanzee has set the supermarket ablaze to smoke them out, mirroring a film she watched earlier. When she exits the locker, she is met by Lou, who arrests her. On the drive back to Minnesota, the two converse about her life and the killings. Hanzee receives a new identity from a confidant in a park, where he also rescues a pair of young boys, one of whom is deaf, from a schoolyard bully whom he attacks violently. Milligan is promoted after taking credit for wiping out the Gerhardts, to find himself working in management from a small corporate office. Betsy recovers from the side effects of her chemotherapy drugs; she, Lou, and Hank gather as a family, with no one able to explain the UFO. Hank tells them that the symbols in his office were his attempt at creating a universal language to promote better global cooperation. The three ponder what the future holds.

== Production ==
=== Development and writing ===
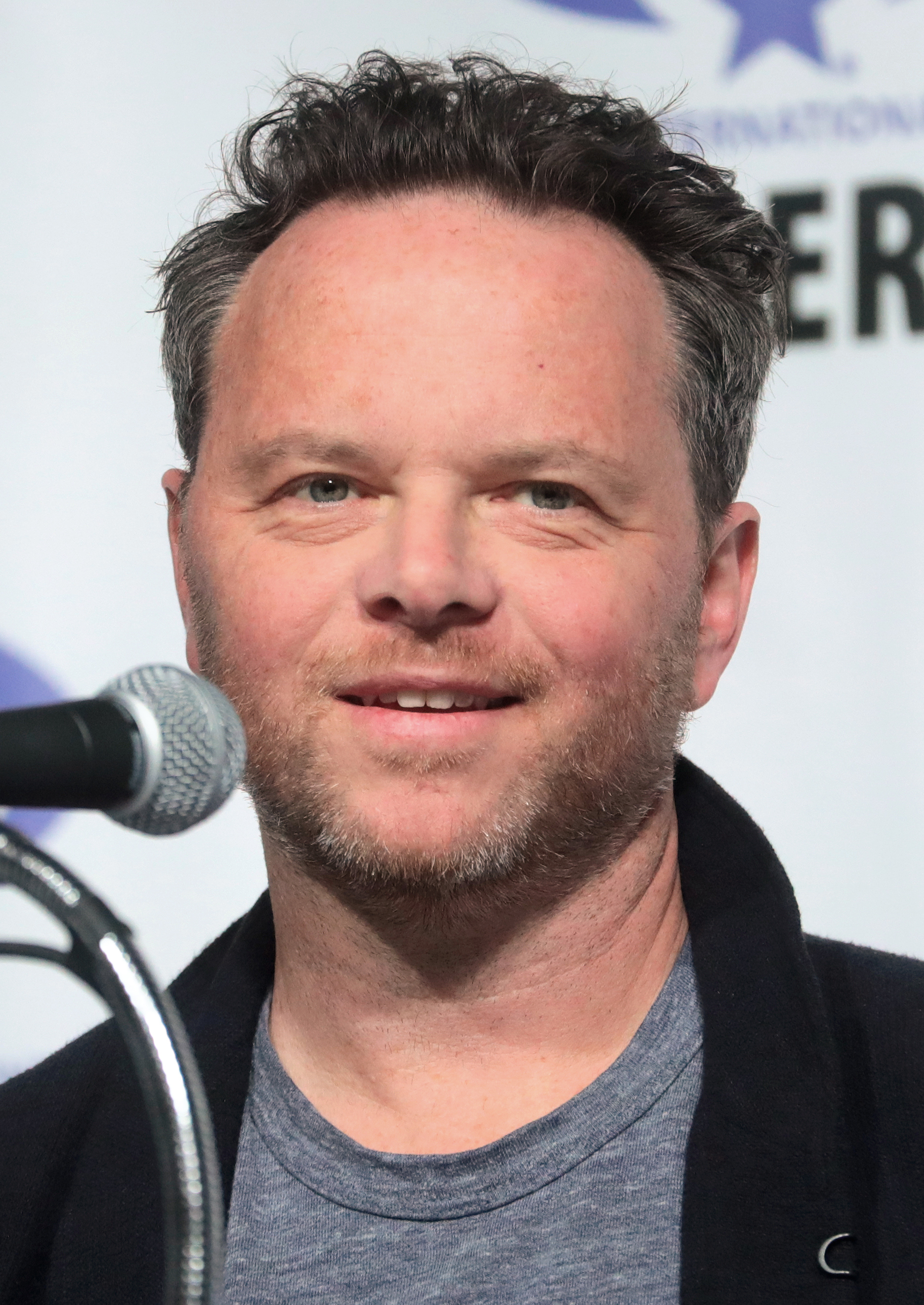
Fargo creator Noah Hawley in 2019

Fargo creator Noah Hawley revealed details of a new season at a Television Critics Association (TCA) press event, and by July 21, 2014, FX commissioned ten episodes for season two. As an anthology, each Fargo season follows a self-contained story, with distinct sets of characters, settings, and events bound by a shared universe.

Hawley and the writers expanded the show's storytelling scope in the characters and subject matter. They doubled the number of main characters to bolster the central story with interconnecting arcs and perspective. Hawley also wanted to elicit sympathy for characters that would normally be perceived unfavorably. The producers at one point discussed revisiting a modern period for the main story. Inspired by Miller's Crossing (1990) and The Man Who Wasn't There (2001), they envisioned a prequel set between Luverne, Minnesota, Fargo, North Dakota and Sioux Falls, South Dakota in 1979, 27 years before the events of Fargo season one. The shift in time, according to Hawley, enabled the creation of a more turbulent onscreen world.

=== Casting ===
A principal cast of five actors received star billing in the show's second season. While Nick Offerman, Brad Garrett, Patrick Wilson and Kirsten Dunst were among several early candidates, Hawley did not tailor his characters with specific actors in mind. The search for actors was sometimes difficult because of the meticulous demands for advertising. Producers then disclosed their expectations for the conditions of the set to a hired talent's agents, especially pertaining to cold weather, logistics, and potential scheduling constraints. Hawley had further discussions about roles to actors inexperienced working in television. Once hired, the cast trained with a dialect coach to master a Minnesota accent.

Dunst and Jesse Plemons were Fargo season two's first significant casting choices. Dunst received news about the show through her agency, and obtained the part the day of her initial meeting with Hawley. The actress recalled, "I was so impressed by the way it looked, the writing; it was such high-quality television." To rehearse, Dunst used dreams she documented as guidance for her character. Plemons came to Hawley's attention for his work in Friday Night Lights (2006–11) and Breaking Bad (2008–13). The actor had increased his weight for the crime film Black Mass (2015), and Hawley felt his bulky physique captured Ed's essence, described as "almost like a cow". Plemons admits he was at first unsure how to approach Ed, as he considered the comparison to a cow descriptive of a buffoonish person.

By January 2015, Wilson, Ted Danson, and Jean Smart completed the starring cast. Wilson was unique among the actors for playing an already established character; Keith Carradine portrayed Lou for the show's first season. Hence, Hawley sought a reinterpretation of the character, though Wilson analyzed Carradine's work for some performance cues. Wilson was compelled by Fargo partly to elevate his career prospects. Danson found learning the Minnesota accent daunting; to improve, he began practicing as soon as he was signed, often before a given shoot. Smart's role required a more aged look, which producers achieved by cutting and dyeing her hair, and Hawley lent the actress a book of paintings by Andrew Wyeth to explain her character.

An ensemble of 20 actors comprises the majority of the cast. Hawley found ensembles enticing because they presented "a lot of really good moving pieces". At Paleyfest 2015, the Fargo creator commented: "It's sort of like a horse race in a way, especially when you know that everyone is on this collision course. It's like, 'Who's going to make it?' And you can put people together in unexpected pairings." Offerman played Karl Weathers, an alcoholic and Luverne's only working lawyer, and Cristin Milioti was hired as Lou's terminally ill wife Betsy Solverson because Hawley considered their personalities similar. Garrett portrays Joe Bulo, and Bokeem Woodbine appears as Mike Milligan, a role he was offered two days after auditioning. For the role of Hanzee Dent, Hawley hired Zahn McClarnon two weeks after his audition. Six others play members of the Gerhardts: Kieran Culkin as Rye, Rachel Keller as Simone, Michael Hogan as Otto, Allan Dobrescu as Charlie, Angus Sampson as Bear, and Jeffrey Donovan as Dodd. When asked about his decision to cast Donovan, Hawley reportedly told the actor, "I don't know. You just come off with a sense of power. I think Dodd comes off with a sense of power, and I thought that you have the chops to find the humor in it." Donovan gained 30 pounds in preparation for his role. Other major supporting roles in Fargo season two include Bruce Campbell as Ronald Reagan, Keir O'Donnell as Ben Schmidt, and Elizabeth Marvel as Constance Heck.

=== Filming ===
Producers embarked on location scouting immediately after Fargo was renewed. Principal photography began in Calgary, Alberta on January 19, 2015, and took 85 days. The city's central business district and Kensington neighborhood doubled for Kansas City, Sioux Falls, and Luverne. The filmmaking crew constructed the Waffle Hut set on the CL Ranch in neighboring Springbank. Elsewhere in the area, shooting took place in Didsbury, High River, Fort Macleod, and St. Mary's University. Initially, the weather posed a challenge for the production because it was too warm for snow. To solve this problem, the production crew brought snow to the set from nearby mountains.

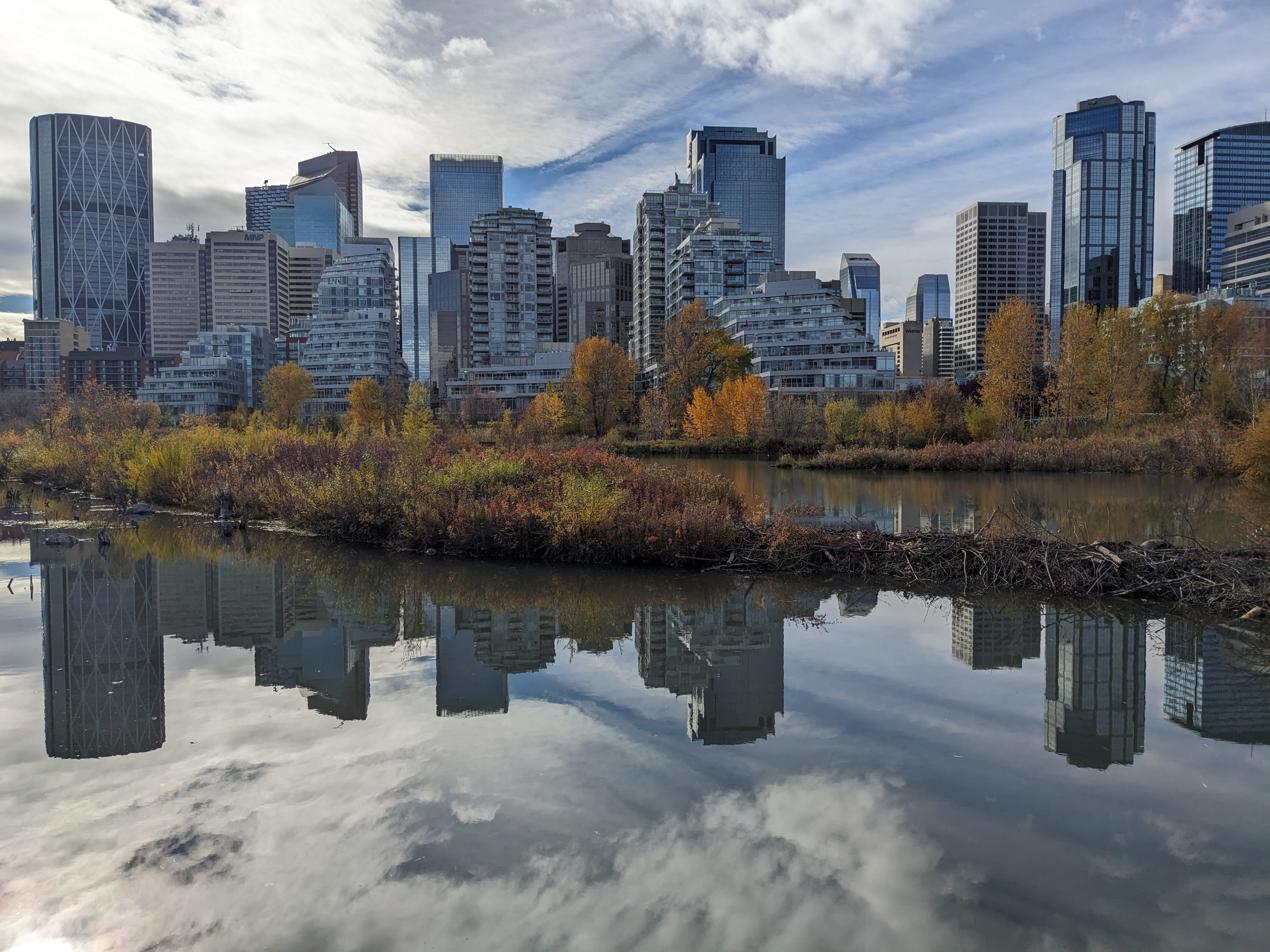
Downtown Calgary skyline, pictured in 2024. The city's central business district and Kensington neighborhood doubled for Kansas City, Luverne, and Sioux Falls.

Continuing his services from season one, Dana Gonzales oversaw production of the show's second season. The cinematographer took cues from William Eggleston to develop a retro visual palette. To achieve this quality, Gonzales relied on vintage practical lighting technology, and captured scenes with an Arri ALEXA camera, retrofitted with vintage Cooke lenses. In one section of Calgary where they were filming, camera crew replaced each sodium-lamp street light with tungsten light bulbs, a lighting style Gonzalez chose intending for a more immersive experience. As well, the production employed split screen effects to streamline the narrative during transitions after Hawley viewed the thriller film The Boston Strangler (1968) for reference. Gonzales said: "We felt that split-screen would be an incredible way to track all these characters and locations within the episode: Where's the Gerhardt family? Where are the guys from Kansas City? Where's Peggy? Where's Ed?"

Costume designer Carol Case worked closely with Hawley on developing Fargo's costumes. Case was particularly interested in replicating the aesthetic of 1970s Western fashion. She and the designers aimed to create wardrobe faithful to a "really small-town America[n]" style. They also felt it was important to distinguish the style of the rural characters from the more image conscious city dwellers. For the city dwelling characters, Case sourced clothes purchased from New York to create a more sophisticated look. Though Fargo producers already had a few pieces in their possession before shooting, sourcing vintage clothes proved challenging, for much of the available supply was inadequately insulated for cold weather. As a consequence, many costumes, such as Dunst's, were either modified by adding insulation, or created anew by the design team. Some modern pieces were used for footwear and accessories.

=== Music ===
Leading music production of Fargo season two were composer Jeff Russo and newly appointed music supervisor Marguerite Phillips, the latter hired immediately after her first meeting with Hawley. Together, they brainstormed the show's musical direction; progressive rock, krautrock, Jethro Tull, and The Runaways were among several early ideas. Phillips spent months searching for song choices that were mostly obscure. Russo employed various compositional and recording techniques to build an authentic retro sound. The soundtrack features songs by Lisa Hannigan, Billy Thorpe, Burl Ives, Cris Williamson, Devo, Jeff Wayne, Yamasuki, Blitzen Trapper, Shakey Graves, White Denim, and Bobby Womack, as well as a cover of Emmylou Harris, Alison Krauss and Gillian Welch's "Didn't Leave Nobody but the Baby" performed by Hawley. The use of "War Pigs" by Black Sabbath in the opening scenes of the season finale received acclaim. Russo also recorded music with the University of Southern California (USC) marching band at Hawley's request.

== Reception ==
=== Ratings ===
Fargo premiered to 1.59 million U.S. viewers; 609,000 were in the 18–49 demographic. Viewership was down by 40% after the series premiere, and 19% from the season one finale. From then on, ratings for the second season fell in the 1.13 to the 1.32 million range until the final episode, which peaked with 1.82 million viewers.

=== Reviews ===
Fargo was considered among the best television shows of 2015 by the American press. On the review aggregator website Rotten Tomatoes, 100% of 233 critics' reviews are positive, with an average rating of 9.1/10. The website's consensus reads: "Season two of Fargo retains all the elements that made the series an award-winning hit, successfully delivering another stellar saga powered by fascinating characters, cheeky cynicism, and just a touch of the absurd." The season also has each episode maintain a perfect 100% rating as well. Metacritic gives the season a score of 96, based on 33 reviews, indicating "universal acclaim". It was the highest rated TV show of the year on the same site, as well as the 20th highest of all time.

Christopher Orr of The Atlantic called Fargo "smart, thrilling, imaginative television, in addition to being wicked funny", in which Hawley assumes greater narrative dimension and assurance in his vision. Matthew Gilbert from The Boston Globe identified the dialog, acting, cinematography, music, set design and directing as its most satisfying attributes. So too did The Hollywood Reporter's Tim Goodman, who believed that said qualities "make a very riveting and entertaining dark comedy spectacle". Neil Genzlinger, writing for The New York Times, said that Fargo marries deadpan humor, violence, and "observational oddity" in a way unmatched by similar dramas. In his review for Variety, Brian Lowry believed that despite the show's brisk pace, Hawley nonetheless adds depth to his story. Dan Jardine of Slant Magazine agreed and thought that the narrative complexity is what distinguishes season two from Fargo's freshman season. Rolling Stone's Rob Sheffield felt that Fargo painted "a fascinating portrait of America at the crossroads". Alan Sepinwall said in his review for HitFix that the series captures its namesake film's most redeeming qualities while assuming a distinct identity, and The A.V. Club website felt that the series was "the rare cable drama that forgoes attenuated storytelling and moral ambiguity, and instead delivers episode after episode where a lot happens, and all of it matters".

The ensemble performances were frequently mentioned in the critiques. Lowry cited the cast as one of the show's strongest assets, and Robert Biano in USA Today wrote that Fargo's cast was "with nary a false note". The Daily Telegraph critic Michael Hogan singled out Dunst, Danson and Wilson for their work on the show, as did the San Francisco Chronicle's David Wiegand, whose opinion was that many of the performers' signature roles enhanced Hawley's script. Matt Zoller Seitz of New York magazine found Wilson to be the stand out among a pool of actors that "deserve their own stand-alone appreciations". He said of the actor's performance: "He's a young man, and he's in good shape, but he carries himself like an older, heavier one, as if weighed down by burdens he hasn't fully acknowledged because he's not ready yet. You get a sense of a personality, perhaps a soul, in the process of evolving." Reviews from Entertainment Weekly and The Washington Post singled out Donovan, Smart, Milioti, Garrett, and Offerman for their acting. Grantland, The New York Observer, and the Los Angeles Times also praised the ensemble performances.

=== Accolades ===
Fargo was a candidate for a variety of awards, most of them recognizing outstanding achievement in writing, cinematography, directing, acting, and special effects. The series received 18 Emmy nominations at the 68th Primetime Emmy Awards. It was named Television Program of the Year by the American Film Institute, and received 3 Golden Globe nominations – such as for Best Actor and Best Actress – Miniseries or TV Film (Wilson and Dunst respectively). Other accolades included 2 Satellite Awards nominations, two TCA Award nominations, and an Empire Award nomination. At the 21st Critics' Choice Awards, Fargo won 4 awards from 8 nominations, the majority of which was for the cast.

== Home media release ==
On February 23, 2016, 20th Century Fox released the second season of Fargo on DVD and Blu-ray formats in region 1. In addition to all ten episodes, both DVD and Blu-ray disc formats include five featurettes; "Lou on Lou: A Conversation with Patrick Wilson, Keith Carradine and Noah Hawley", "Waffles and Bullet Holes: A Return to Sioux Falls", "The Films of Ronald Reagan: Extended Fargo cut", "The True History of Crime in the Midwest", and "Skip Sprang TV Commercial".
