= Hanzee Dent =

Fargo character

- Fargo character
- First appearance: "Buridan's Ass" (2014)
- Last appearance: "Palindrome" (2015)
- Created by: Noah Hawley
- Portrayed by: Season 1: Mark Acheson; Season 2: Zahn McClarnon

In-universe information
- Alias: Moses Tripoli
- Occupation: Season 1: Mob boss; Season 2: Hitman

Ohanzee "Hanzee" Dent is a character in the FX television series Fargo, appearing as the main antagonist in the second season, played by Zahn McClarnon. A soldier in the Vietnam War, Dent was mistreated throughout his entire life by people due to his Native American heritage. Due to this, he is a merciless misanthrope and eventually develops into a sociopath, killing anybody who threatens his adoptive families' criminal empire.

== Character overview ==
Hanzee is a mysterious Native American tracker and hitman working for the Gerhardt family having been adopted by Otto Gerhardt at a young age. It is noted by the narrator (Martin Freeman) in "The Castle" that "Not much is known about Ohanzee Dent. We have no birth certificate, no tribal or family history." Similar to Coen (or Coen-esque) villains like Anton Chigurh and Lorne Malvo, he fits the "unstoppable killer" archetype, having been responsible for several deaths during the war against Kansas City and the search for the Blumquists. However, despite seemingly being cold and remorseless, he is shown to be a complex person with a complicated, tragic backstory, suffering from the racism and ill-treatment of various countrymen. When he stops by a bar en route to Sioux Falls, he happens upon a plaque outside the bar boasting about deaths of 22 Sioux Indians who were hanged there, with a puddle of vomit below. He endures bigotry from the bartender despite informing him of his service in Vietnam which prompts him to kill the bartender, a few racist bar patrons and two state police officers, although one officer survived and was left in critical condition, mentioned by Lou in a previous episode. On his character's sudden betrayal of his employers, McClarnon stated "Hanzee had an agenda from the beginning. There are multiple moments that happen throughout the show that suggests he wanted to become more of an individual."

== Role in the series ==
=== 1979 ===
In 1979, Hanzee accompanies Dodd Gerhardt to a meeting with Dodd's younger brother Rye, watching Dodd confront Rye about not earning enough money for the family. When the Kansas City Mafia comes to Fargo and threatens to eliminate the Gerhardt family and take their territory, Hanzee stood by Dodd in his use of violence before they do, while Dodd's mother Floyd wanted to use diplomacy.

Meanwhile, Rye botched an attempt at threatening a judge into helping Skip Sprang, a business partner of his, resulting in Rye murdering the judge as well as the cook and waitress at a diner. Following this, Rye was hit by a car driven by Peggy Blumquist, who drove home with him in her windshield and where he was killed by her husband Ed in self-defense. This sparked a chain of events that led to Dodd tasking Hanzee with tracking Rye down before Kansas City could. Dodd's daughter Simone tips off Hanzee about a lead on Rye, and they ambush Skip at Rye's apartment. He is brought to Dodd for interrogation. Learning that Skip has no information on his brother's whereabouts, Dodd and Hanzee force Skip into an open grave and bury him alive in hot asphalt. Dodd then tells Hanzee to do what is necessary to find Rye, beginning in Luverne. Hanzee's investigation leads him to find Rye's belt buckle in the Blumquist fireplace. He and Dodd concoct a story—in which Ed is a hitman called "The Butcher" hired by Kansas City to kill Rye—in an attempt to rile Floyd into bloodshed. She has Hanzee and accomplices ambush a group of Kansas City men during a hunting trip. Hanzee kills Joe Bulo and a Kitchen brother and sends the former's head to Mike Milligan.

When Floyd insists that "The Butcher" be executed, and Charlie released from jail, Dodd and accomplices arrive at the Blumquist residence hunting Ed, while Bear fetches Charlie. Hanzee knocks out Hank, but Peggy subdues Dodd in her basement using his stun rod. Bear and his men arrive on-site as Weathers leaves. Knowing Ed will be shot swiftly, Lou hatches a plan. Karl Weathers distracts Bear while Lou sneaks Ed out a rear window, narrowly avoiding Hanzee. Bear and his men leave without incident. Hank, now well enough to drive back to town, intercepts Lou and Ed, though Ed runs off, presumably back to Peggy. Hanzee follows him shortly thereafter. A manhunt for Hanzee is organized after he shoots five individuals at a bar. He finds Constance in her hotel room at the seminar and unsuccessfully forces her to lure Peggy to reveal her general whereabouts, strangling her afterward. A gas station attendant calls the police after he recognizes Hanzee in his shop, prompting Hanzee to kill him. Hanzee finds the cabin and holds Ed and Peggy at gunpoint and asks for a haircut from Peggy before shooting Dodd in the head. Lou and Hank burst through the rear door and exchange gunfire with Hanzee as Peggy stabs him in the back with the scissors. Hanzee flees out the front door.

Observing the police setting up a sting to apprehend Milligan, Hanzee decides to betray the Gerhardts. He lies to Floyd and Bear by claiming Dodd is being held inside the motel by the Kansas City mob. Meanwhile, Lou stops at the gas station to call home, unaware his wife has collapsed, then discovers that Hanzee killed the attendant. Lou rushes to warn the others and arrives to find the Gerhardts on the offensive against Cheney and his team. By the time the shootout is over, Bear and all of the Gerhardt soldiers are dead, as are all of the cops except for Hank and Schmidt. Hanzee stabs Floyd to death and, as he moves to kill the Blumquists, a UFO appears in the midst of the chaos, distracting him long enough for Peggy to throw hot water in his face, burning a hole open on the side of his mouth and scarring him, causing Dent to become enraged.

The Blumquists manage to flee the premises, with Hanzee in hot pursuit for reasons that are, according to the narrator, lost to history (with the narrator positing that Hanzee most likely wants to get rid of the two people who saw his true colors when he asked Peggy to cut his hair after he killed Dodd). Hanzee shoots Ed as he and Peggy flee through an alley. The pair take shelter in the meat locker of a supermarket. Ed eventually succumbs to blood loss, causing Peggy to have a mental breakdown and hallucinate that Hanzee has set the supermarket ablaze to smoke them out. However, the latter has since fled. Sometime later, a confidant gives him a new identity, Moses Tripoli, and asks him if he would want plastic surgery. Hanzee vows to take revenge on Kansas City, echoing his future "Not Apprehended, Dead" remark, before rescuing the future Mr. Wrench and Mr. Numbers from a schoolyard bully.

== Reception ==
The character has received praise from both critics and fans alike, some comparing him favorably to season one's Lorne Malvo. Zachary Davies Bore of The Independent claimed that "The Native American assassin is quite probably the most compelling character on the show". Alan Sepinwall of Uproxx praised the character's development in the episode 'Loplop' saying "the episode and Zahn McClarnon's performance went a long way to helping us understand him, and to appreciate why, after the journey he's been on, Hanzee would be so focused on getting a haircut that might invite a few less sarcastic war whoops the next time he goes for a drink."

The reveal that Hanzee eventually becomes the mob boss Mr. Tripoli from season one has received criticism, however. Most complaints stem from the fact that the two characters lack resemblance to each other, although it is implied in the last episode of season two that Hanzee had reconstructive facial surgery.
