= Floyd Gerhardt =

Fargo character

- Fargo character
- First appearance: "Waiting for Dutch" (2015)
- Last appearance: "Palindrome" (2015)
- Created by: Noah Hawley
- Portrayed by: Jean Smart

In-universe information
- Gender: Female
- Spouse: Otto Gerhardt
- Children: Dodd Gerhardt (son); Rye Gerhardt (son); Bear Gerhardt (son)
- Relatives: Simone Gerhardt (granddaughter); Charlie Gerhardt (grandson)

Floyd Gerhardt is a fictional character in the second season of the FX television series Fargo and is portrayed by Jean Smart. Smart received widespread critical acclaim for her performance, winning the Critics' Choice Television Award for Best Supporting Actress in a Movie/Miniseries and was nominated for the Primetime Emmy Award for Outstanding Supporting Actress in a Limited Series or Movie.

== Character overview ==
In March 1979, Floyd Gerhardt is the matriarch of The Gerhardt family, which is the most powerful organized crime syndicate in Fargo, North Dakota. Their power is threatened by two near-simultaneous incidents, taking place merely hours apart. First, a debilitating stroke leaves her husband Otto crippled, potentially jeopardizing the dynasty's leadership. Two of their sons, Dodd (Jeffrey Donovan) and Bear (Angus Sampson), begin competing for control. While they are figuring out who will lead the family, Floyd is put in charge. The Gerhardts are facing a serious challenge from the Kansas City Mafia, led by Joe Bulo (Brad Garrett), for control of the region. Meanwhile, Floyd's third son Rye (Kieran Culkin) has gone missing. Unbeknownst to Floyd and the rest of her family, he has been killed by Peggy Blumquist (Kirsten Dunst) in a hit and run after murdering a judge, cook and waitress at a diner in Luverne, Minnesota.

Bulo arrives at the Gerhardt residence, along with Mike Milligan (Bokeem Woodbine) and the two Kitchen brothers. Bulo offers Floyd a buyout of her family's operation, but will allow them to run it. After he leaves, Floyd tells her sons, minus the missing Rye, about the meeting. Dodd bristles at his mother running the business, but concedes when she assures him that he can take over once the current situation settles. She then demands that Rye be found. Mike and the Kitchens also begin searching for Rye. Dodd and his henchman Hanzee (Zahn McClarnon), as well as Mike, each conduct an independent search for him. Dodd's daughter Simone tips off Hanzee about a lead on Rye, and they ambush Skip at Rye's apartment. They bring him to Dodd, who assaults Simone for acting independently before killing Skip by burying him in hot asphalt.

A few days later, Mike and the Kitchens then eliminate Otto's guards in the parking lot outside the medical clinic, leaving Otto unharmed. Meanwhile, Floyd, Dodd, and Bear meet with Joe Bulo and propose a counter-offer to his buyout: a partnership. Bulo balks at the idea, after an incident earlier that day where Dodd assaulted two of his men in a donut shop with help from Bear's son Charlie. Bulo phones his superiors who reject the Gerhardts' proposal. They now offer $2 million less than the first offer and demand the Gerhardts' completely surrender. At the Gerhardt farm, Floyd tells the family to prepare for war.

Dodd and Hanzee concoct a story – about Ed Blumquist (Jesse Plemons) being a hitman called "The Butcher" who was hired by Kansas City to kill Rye – trying to rile Floyd into bloody action. She responds by having Hanzee and a team of Gerhardt assassins ambush Bulo during a hunting trip. In the resulting shootout, Hanzee kills Wayne Kitchen as well as Bulo, sparing Gale so he can deliver the latter's head to Mike. Mike threatens Dodd's daughter Simone (Rachel Keller) during their next dalliance, demanding that she spy on her family for him. Meanwhile, Dodd sends his henchman Virgil Bauer (Greg Bryk) to Luverne to kill Ed, and allows Bear's son, Charlie (Allan Dobrescu), to accompany him. Virgil and Charlie arrive in Luverne and botch an attempt to kill Ed. Virgil is killed, Charlie is hospitalized, Ed is arrested and the butcher shop is burned down. In Fargo, Floyd insists that "The Butcher" be executed and Charlie retrieved from jail. Hours later, Dodd and accomplices arrive at the Blumquist home hunting Ed, while Bear heads to the police station to fetch Charlie. Hanzee knocks out Hank, but Peggy subdues Dodd in her basement using his stun rod. Meanwhile, Simone calls Mike Milligan and reveals the Gerhardts' plan that Dodd and Bear departed for Luverne. Fed up with her father's abuse, she wants Mike to murder Dodd. Having a different interpretation of her message, Mike and his men drive onto the thinly protected farm and shoot up the house, killing Otto.

Otto and some of Rye's belongings, including his belt buckle, are buried at the Gerhardt farm. Lou Solverson (Patrick Wilson) and Ben Schmidt (Keir O'Donnell) arrive after the funeral and take Floyd to the station for questioning. She eventually accepts a deal that will absolve her family members for previous crimes they have committed in exchange for information about how the Kansas City syndicate runs their criminal operation. Dodd is kidnapped and taken hostage by Peggy and Ed after trying to attack them. Ed calls Mike and offers Dodd in exchange for getting the Gerhardts off their backs. After, Hanzee comes to kill the Blumquists and kills Dodd. He then asks Peggy for a haircut so he can be free of "this life". Before Peggy can begin, Lou arrives to arrest the Blumquists, and he escapes.

After being arrested, Ed reveals his upcoming rendezvous with Mike to hand over now-dead Dodd Gerhardt to the cops at Sioux Falls. South Dakota State Police Captain Cheney hatches a dangerous scheme for Ed and Peggy to wear a wire for the meeting, hoping to implicate Milligan and the Kansas City mob. After Ed and Peggy agree to the plan in exchange for lesser criminal charges, the police set up an ambush at the motel meeting spot, only for Hanzee to observe their actions from a distance. Hanzee lies to Floyd and Bear by claiming Dodd is being held inside the motel by the Kansas City mob. When the Gerhadt family is about to invade the hotel and take back what they think is Dodd who is kidnapped by the Kansas City mob, Hanzee reveals his true intentions and stabs Floyd to death.

== Reception ==
Smart received critical acclaim for her performance.

For her performance in the episode "Fear and Trembling", TVLine named her their "Performer of the Week", writing: "In the opening weeks of the FX series’ second season, we saw hints of Floyd's formidability as the Gerhardt crime family matriarch, newly thrust as she was into a position of leadership after husband Otto's stroke. But it was when she sat down to present a “respectable” counteroffer to Kansas City, the syndicate fronted by Joe Bulo (played by Brad Garrett), that Smart took revelatory dialogue and crafted a compelling picture of one tough mother."

=== Accolades ===
For her performance, Smart won the Critics' Choice Television Award for Best Supporting Actress in a Movie/Miniseries and was nominated for the Primetime Emmy Award for Outstanding Supporting Actress in a Limited Series or Movie.
