= Peggy Blumquist =

Fargo character

- Fargo character
- First appearance: "Waiting for Dutch" (2015)
- Last appearance: "Palindrome" (2015)
- Created by: Noah Hawley
- Portrayed by: Kirsten Dunst

In-universe information
- Occupation: Hairdresser
- Spouse: Ed Blumquist

Peggy Blumquist is a fictional character in the second season of the FX television series Fargo and is portrayed by Kirsten Dunst. Dunst received widespread critical acclaim for her performance, which was widely lauded as one of the best performances of 2015. She won the Critics' Choice Television Award for Best Actress in a Movie/Miniseries, and was nominated for the Golden Globe Award for Best Actress – Miniseries or Television Film and Primetime Emmy Award for Outstanding Lead Actress in a Limited Series or Movie.

== Character overview ==
In 1979, Peggy Blumquist is a hairdresser in Luverne, Minnesota who is married to her high school sweetheart, local butcher Ed Blumquist. She is dissatisfied with small-town life and wants to take a $500 Lifespring course in "self-actualization" (which is implied to be a scam) so she can better herself. This conflicts with Ed's plans to use the money to buy the butcher shop, where he works, and start a family. Later, Peggy takes contraceptives and spends the money on the course anyway.

One night, Peggy accidentally hits Rye Gerhardt after he wandered onto the road after spotting a UFO. Peggy panics and drives home with Rye on her hood, stuck through her windshield, instead of calling the police (a reference to the murder of Gregory Glenn Biggs). When he regains consciousness in their garage and attacks Ed, Ed kills him in self-defense. They dispose of the body, and upon her suggestion, cover the car damage by driving into a tree.

Unbeknownst to Peggy, Rye is a member of the Gerhardt crime family who has just murdered three people. State trooper Lou Solverson figures out what happened and tries to persuade the Blumquists to come forward so the police can protect them from the Gerhardts, but Peggy tells him to leave. Peggy wants to flee to California but Ed believes their life is in Luverne.

When the Gerhardt family matriarch, Floyd, learns that Rye was killed by "the butcher", she mistakenly assumes that Ed is a hitman and her son Dodd sends enforcer Virgil along with his nephew (Bear's son Charlie) to kill him.

Peggy plans to leave town before having a change of heart and selling the car to give the money to Ed for the shop. At the same time, Virgil and Charlie try to kill Ed in the shop. In the course of the attack, Virgil is killed, Charlie is wounded, and the butcher shop burns down.

After Charlie's arrest, Floyd sends Dodd to finally kill "the butcher". Peggy manages to subdue Dodd and tie him up. Ed and Peggy then flee, taking Dodd prisoner, planning to make a deal with the Gerhardts to exchange him for safety. Due to the Gerhardt's seeming uninterest in having Dodd returned, Ed decides to give him to a rival crime family in Kansas City, Missouri in return for money and protection. Dodd gets loose from his bindings, however, and attacks Peggy. Just as Dodd is about to kill Peggy and Ed, traitorous Gerhardt enforcer Hanzee Dent dispatches him. Moments later, the police arrive and Hanzee opens fire on them; Peggy stabs him in the back with a pair of scissors, and she and Ed are taken into police custody.

The South Dakota State Police strong-arm Peggy and Ed into wearing wiretaps when meeting with the Kansas City mob in return for reduced jail time, and place them under protective custody in a hotel. The Gerhardts attack the hotel, tricked by Hanzee into thinking that Ed has Dodd there, and Peggy and Ed flee during the resulting gunfight between the Gerhardts and the police. Ed sees a UFO as they run away, but Peggy dismisses it as "just a flying saucer". Hanzee runs after them and mortally wounds Ed, but Peggy manages to drag him into a grocery store and hole up in the walk-in freezer. As Peggy frantically tries to figure out a means of escape, Ed says that their relationship has been irreparably damaged by all that has happened and dies. Lou arrests Peggy and takes her to jail. On the way there, in Lou's police car, Peggy expresses her hope to be taken to a federal prison in California before lamenting that she just "wanted to be somebody" and is also a victim.

In addition to her eccentric personality and poor decision-making skills, Peggy is shown to be mentally unstable. She has a severe hoarding habit and the basement is shown to be stacked near the ceiling with travel and lifestyle magazines. She has several hallucinations and appears to confuse fiction with reality. When Dodd is tied up by Peggy in the Blumquists' basement, she hallucinates him as a Lifespring speaker and converses with him about life. When holed up in the cabin, she is engrossed in a fictional World War II movie, Operation Eagle's Nest, in which an SS Officer lights a fire to smoke out a man and woman hiding in a basement. Later when running from Hanzee the couple hide in a supermarket freezer, Hanzee lights a fire under the intake vent outside to smoke them out, and Peggy realizes it's "Just like the movie!". Believing the movie has become reality, she storms out to confront Hanzee and is subdued by Trooper Solverson and Sheriff Larsson who inform her that Hanzee never pursued them into the store and there was no fire or smoke.

== Production ==
Noah Hawley has stated that when he started writing season two, he initially planned the season out as being more focused on Ed and Peggy instead of being an ensemble drama, saying "this idea of a couple, played by Jesse Plemons and Kirsten Dunst, who are caught between these two rival crime organizations, the Gerhardt family and the Kansas City mafia. Well, suddenly you have two rival crime organizations that need characters, and you also need your cops who are going to interject themselves between these people. So suddenly you have four or five huge moving pieces that have to be serviced."

During filming, Dunst purposely did not read any of the non-Ed and Peggy related storylines, saying "Peggy's so in her own world, I didn't want to be influenced by anything else that was happening in the story. So I just would read things that were happening with Ed and Peg. She's so tunnel-visioned about her goals and what needs to happen that I didn't want to think about the whole show. It makes it more fun for me now, because I can watch and enjoy it myself and not know what everyone's going to say."

== Reception ==
Dunst received widespread critical acclaim for her performance, which was often cited as one of the best performances of 2015.

=== Accolades ===
For her performance, Dunst won the Critics' Choice Television Award for Best Actress in a Movie/Miniseries, and was nominated for the Golden Globe Award for Best Actress – Miniseries or Television Film and Primetime Emmy Award for Outstanding Lead Actress in a Limited Series or Movie.
