= Zahn McClarnon =

American actor (born 1966)

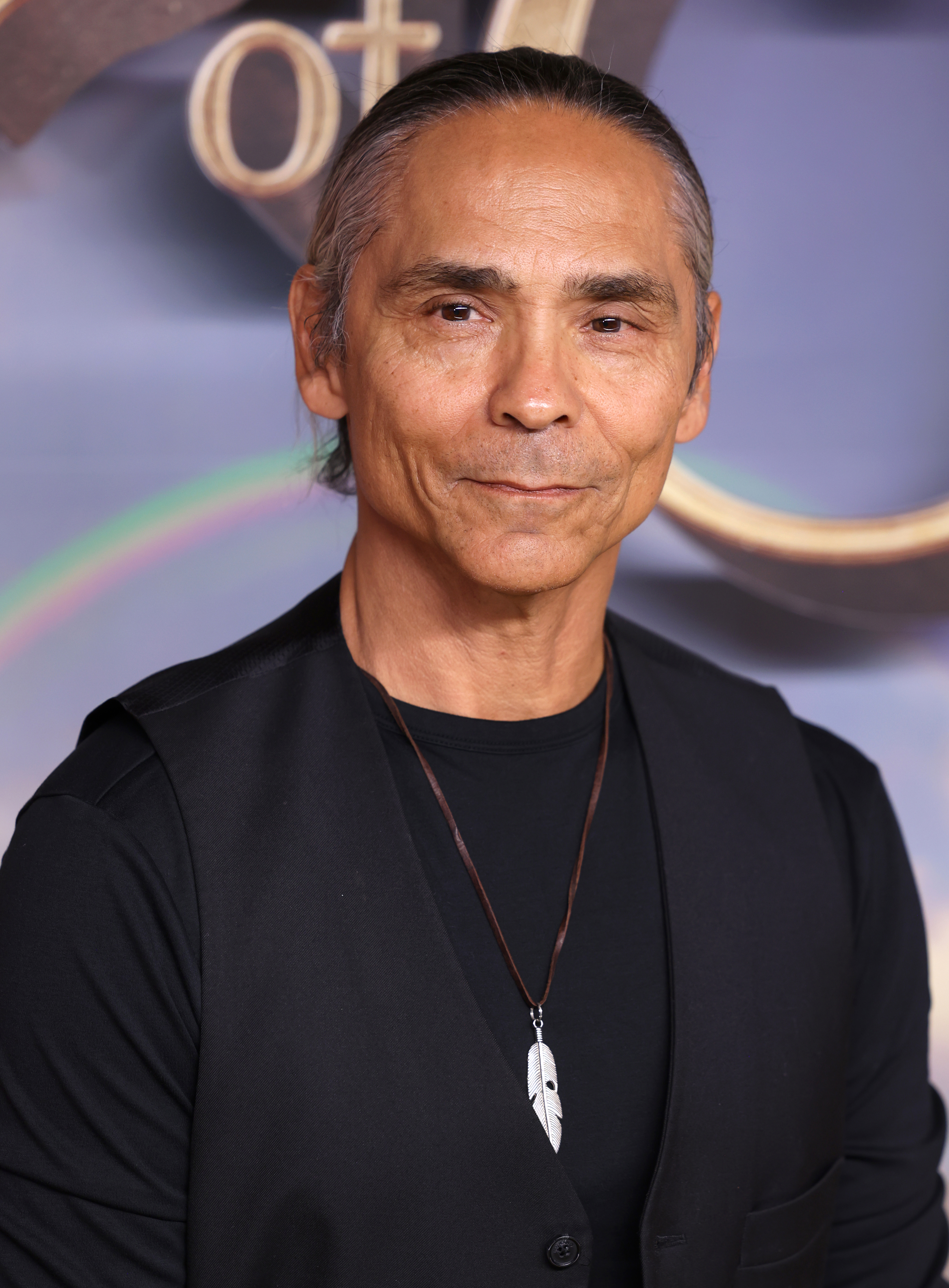
- McClarnon in 2025
- Born: Zahn Tokiya-ku McClarnon; October 24, 1966 (age 60); Denver, Colorado, U.S.
- Education: Omaha Central High School
- Occupation: Actor
- Years active: 1992–present

Zahn Tokiya-ku McClarnon (born October 24, 1966) is a Native American (Hunkpapa Lakota) actor, best known for his television work. He first came to prominence with key supporting roles as tribal police chief Mathias on Longmire (2012–17), Hanzee Dent on the second season of Fargo (2015), Toshaway on The Son (2017–19), and Akecheta on the second season of Westworld (2018). Since 2022, he has played the lead role of Joe Leaphorn in the AMC series Dark Winds, of which he is also an executive producer.

McClarnon's other notable roles include William Lopez in the Marvel Cinematic Universe series Hawkeye (2021) and Echo (2024), Officer Big in Reservation Dogs (2021–23), and the voice of Olrox in Castlevania: Nocturne (2023–present).

== Early life and education ==
Zahn Tokiya-ku McClarnon was born in Denver, Colorado, the son of a Hunkpapa Lakota mother and a father of Irish ancestry. He grew up near Browning, Montana, where his father worked at Glacier National Park for the National Park Service. He would often visit the Blackfeet Indian Reservation, where his mother grew up, and often stayed with his maternal grandparents on weekends and for longer visits. His mother lived on the Rosebud Indian Reservation in South Dakota. When his father was relocated to Omaha, Nebraska, for work, the family lived in the Joslyn Castle and Dundee neighborhoods. McClarnon has a brother.

McClarnon grew up in Nebraska, North Dakota, South Dakota, Minnesota, Wyoming, Ohio, and Montana, and has stated that his childhood was "rough."

In 1985, McClarnon graduated from Omaha Central High School. He credits his drama teacher, Peggy Stommes, as a big influence. McClarnon moved to Phoenix after high school. He went on trips to Los Angeles with friends, until one day he decided to stay.

== Career ==
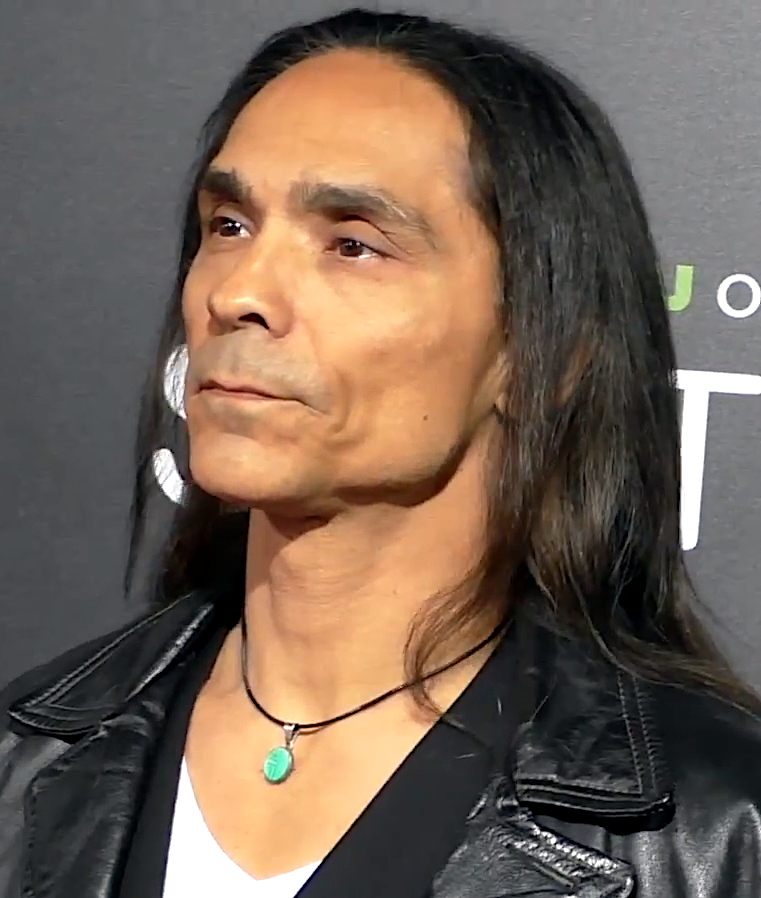
McClarnon in 2016

McClarnon got his start in a local production of Jesus Christ Superstar at the Chanticleer Theater in Council Bluffs, Iowa. He connected with John Jackson, a local Omaha casting director who later became known for his work with director Alexander Payne. McClarnon gained some local work and in the early 1990s, he moved to Los Angeles for his career.

In the Into the West (2005) miniseries for TNT, McClarnon played Running Fox. He starred in the 2009 film Not Forgotten and comedy film Repo Chick. In 2013, he was in the horror movie Resolution. He had a recurring role as Bodaway Macawi in Ringer. He played Mike Parker in the first four episodes of the SundanceTV series The Red Road.

From 2012 to 2017, McClarnon portrayed Mathias, the Chief of Indian Tribal Police of the Cheyenne reservation, in Longmire, originally an A&E and later a Netflix television series.

McClarnon portrayed Hanzee Dent in the second season of the TV series Fargo, where his performance received critical acclaim. He appeared in the TV series Timeless as Native American U.S. Marshal Grant Johnson in the episode "The Murder of Jesse James". McClarnon appeared as Toshaway in AMC Network's The Son, for which he learned the Comanche language.

McClarnon appeared as Akecheta, the leader of the Ghost Nation, in HBO's Westworld. Although usually credited as a recurring character, McClarnon was credited as a main cast member in "Kiksuya", the eighth episode of the second season, which focuses on his character's backstory. His performance in the episode received critical acclaim, with the critic's consensus on the review aggregate website Rotten Tomatoes stating that McClarnon delivered a "heart-wrenching, formidable performance" that elevates the episode to "one of the best of the entire series".

In 2019, McClarnon appeared as Crow Daddy, a central antagonist, in the film Doctor Sleep. Since 2021, McClarnon has portrayed Officer Big in the comedy-drama Reservation Dogs.

In 2021, it was announced that McClarnon would star as Joe Leaphorn in Dark Winds, a psychological thriller television series on AMC. It premiered on June 12, 2022 and is now going on its fourth season, which premiered February 15, 2026.

In 2026, McClarnon received the Visionary Award at the 2026 Santa Fe International Film Festival.

== Personal life ==
McClarnon's first name is in honor of his maternal great-great-uncle, Frank "Francis" B. Zahn (Flying Cloud), who was an artist and Lakota elder of Standing Rock Indian Reservation. McClarnon's middle name, Tokiya-ku, loosely translates to mean "first one to come." He was given that name by his mother because he was the first delivered in a set of twins.

In late 2017, McClarnon fell at his home and suffered a brain injury, requiring hospitalization. The accident caused a brief shutdown of production for Westworld. He has since recovered.

McClarnon has discussed his struggles with substance abuse in interviews.

== Filmography ==
=== Film ===
Year	Title	Role	Notes
1988	My Neighbor Totoro	Additional voices	Voice role; 2005 Disney English dub
1994	Silent Fall	Deputy Bear	
2002	Spirit: Stallion of the Cimarron	Little Creek's Friend	Voice role
2006	The Librarian: Return to King Solomon's Mines	Tommy Yellow Hawk	Made-for-television film
2007	Searchers 2.0	Rusty Frobisher	
2009	Not Forgotten	Calvo	
2009	Repo Chick	Savage Dan	
2009	Down for Life	Grim	
2012	Resolution	Charles	
2013	Awful Nice	Romulus	
2013	Bloodline	Jack	
2013	I'm in Love with a Church Girl	Jessie	
2015	Mekko	Bill	
2015	Bone Tomahawk	The Professor	
2016	Neither Wolf Nor Dog	Billy	
2018	Braven	Hallett	
2019	Doctor Sleep	Crow Daddy	
2019	Hell on the Border	Sam Sixkiller	
2019	Togo	Tulimak	
2020	The Silencing	Blackhawk	
2021	The Forever Purge	Chiago	
2022	The Last Manhunt	William Johnson	
2023	Americana	Ghost Eye	
2023	No Hard Feelings	Gabe Sawyer	

=== Television ===
Year	Title	Role	Notes
1992	Tequila and Bonetti	Hispanic Kid	1 episode
1992	Baywatch	Bear Sutter	1 episode
1993	Murphy Brown	Man #3	1 episode
1993–1997	Dr. Quinn, Medicine Woman	Walks on Cloud & Red Deer	5 episodes
1994	Renegade	Jerry	1 episode
1994	Thunder in Paradise	Billy Cyprus	1 episode
1995	Walker Texas Ranger	Little Bear	1 episode
1996	The Lazarus Man	Nakai	1 episode
1996–1997	Dangerous Minds	Carlos Montalvo	3 episodes
1997	NYPD Blue	Hector	1 episode
1997	Chicago Hope	George Burroughs	1 episode
2005	Into the West	Running Fox	Miniseries, 3 episodes
2007	Saving Grace	Ames Blackbird	1 episode
2008	Comanche Moon	Ermoke	Miniseries, 1 episode
2008	The Shield	Avila	1 episode
2009	Life	Tomas Shasta	1 episode
2010	Medium	Alex Keeswood	1 episode
2011	Castle	Roy Horton	1 episode
2011–2012	Ringer	Bodaway Macawi	Recurring role, 8 episodes
2012–2017	Longmire	Police Chief Mathias	Recurring role, 29 episodes
2014	The Red Road	Mike Parker	Recurring role, 4 episodes
2015	Fargo	Hanzee Dent	Recurring role, 9 episodes
2016–2017	Frontier	Samoset	3 episodes
2017	Timeless	Grant Johnson	1 episode
2017	Midnight, Texas	Zachariah	1 episode
2017–2019	The Son	Toshaway	Main role, 20 episodes
2018, 2022	Westworld	Akecheta	Recurring role, 8 episodes
2018	Queen of the South	Taza	Recurring role, 4 episodes
2019	Drunk History	Adam Fortunate Eagle	1 episode
2019	Robot Chicken	Snowball	Voice role, 1 episode
2020	Barkskins	Yvon	Main role, 8 episodes
2021–2023	Reservation Dogs	Officer Big	Recurring role, 12 episodes
2021	Hawkeye	William Lopez	1 episode
2022–present	Dark Winds	Joe Leaphorn	Main role; 28 episodes Also executive producer
2023	History of the World, Part II	Mingoes	3 episodes
2023–present	Castlevania: Nocturne	Olrox	Voice role
2024	Echo	William Lopez	3 episodes
2024	Ark: The Animated Series	Thunder Comes Charging	Voice role

=== Video games ===
Year	Title	Role	Notes
2010	Red Dead Redemption	The Local Population	
