= Bokeem Woodbine =

American actor (born 1973)

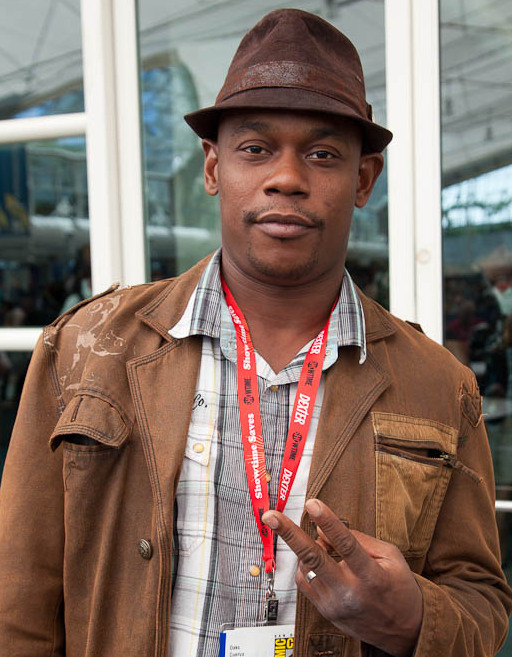
- Woodbine in 2011
- Born: April 13, 1973 (age 53); New York City, U.S.
- Occupation: Actor
- Years active: 1992–present
- Spouse: Mahiely Woodbine (m. 1999)
- Children: 2

Bokeem Woodbine (born April 13, 1973) is an American actor. In 1994, he portrayed Joshua, the main character's troubled brother, in Jason's Lyric. He won a Black Reel Award and was nominated for a Primetime Emmy Award and a Critics' Choice Television Award for his role as Kansas City mob enforcer Mike Milligan in the second season of Fargo. Woodbine also portrayed Daniel in season 2 of the WGN series Underground, Herman Schultz / Shocker in the film Spider-Man: Homecoming, and saxophonist David "Fathead" Newman in the Oscar-winning Ray Charles biopic Ray.

== Early life and education ==
Woodbine was born on April 13, 1973, in Harlem, New York City. He attended the Dalton School on Manhattan's Upper East Side, before transferring to the Fiorello H. LaGuardia High School of Music & Art and Performing Arts in the city.

== Career ==
Woodbine made his TV acting debut in the CBS Schoolbreak Special titled "Love Off Limits." His appearance was noticed by casting director Jaki Brown-Karman, who later recommended him to Forest Whitaker for the latter's directorial effort, the HBO television movie Strapped (1993). Since then, he has worked with other major African-American filmmakers such as Spike Lee in Crooklyn (1994), Mario Van Peebles in Panther (1995) and the Hughes Brothers in the film, Dead Presidents (1995).

In 1996, Woodbine appeared in Tupac Shakur's music video for "I Ain't Mad at Cha" and formed a friendship with the rapper. They subsequently reunited in Vondie Curtis-Hall's directorial debut, Gridlock'd, which was released four months after Shakur's death. In 1999, Woodbine appeared in an episode of HBO's The Sopranos as New Jersey gangster rapper Massive Genius.

Woodbine was featured as a regular on the NBC midseason sitcom Battery Park and played Dr. Damon Bradley, who later turned out to be a serial rapist, in the short-lived CBS medical drama City of Angels, the latter of which earned him a nomination for the NAACP Image Award for Outstanding Supporting Actor in a Drama Series. Additionally, he appeared in the Wu-Tang Clan's music videos for their songs "Protect Ya Neck II (The Jump Off)," "Gravel Pit," and "Careful (Click, Click)." Woodbine went to portray saxophonist David "Fathead" Newman in the Oscar-winning Ray Charles biopic Ray.

Over the next few years, Woodbine made minor appearances in both film and television. On the small screen, he could be seen in an episode of Fox's crime drama Bones and ABC's short-lived cop drama The Evidence, as well as two episodes of Spike TV's Blade: The Series, based on Marvel Comics' character and popular film series. The next year, Woodbine appeared with his Blade: The Series co-star Sticky Fingaz in his musical drama film A Day in the Life, starring Omar Epps and Mekhi Phifer, and two films by Jesse V. Johnson: the low-budget sci-fi/action movie The Last Sentinel (alongside Don "The Dragon" Wilson and Katee Sackhoff), and the action film The Butcher, opposite Eric Roberts. He also became a series regular, as Leon Cooley, an inmate on death row, in the TNT crime/drama series Saving Grace alongside Holly Hunter.

In 2009, Woodbine appeared in the blaxploitation film Black Dynamite and followed it up the next year with the M. Night Shyamalan-produced supernatural thriller Devil. He has also appeared as a police officer on the critically acclaimed series Southland (2011). He next appeared in the 2012 remake of Total Recall and then Riddick the next year.

In December 2015, Woodbine received a Critics' Choice Television Award nomination for Best Supporting Actor in a Movie/Miniseries and a Primetime Emmy Award nomination for his role as Mike Milligan in Fargo.

In 2017, Woodbine appeared in the Sony Pictures and Marvel Studios film Spider-Man: Homecoming, as Shocker, one of four villains, alongside Michael Keaton, Logan Marshall-Green and Michael Chernus. In 2018, Woodbine starred in the series Unsolved. He played Daryn Dupree, who was part of a police task force that investigated the murders of rappers Notorious BIG and Tupac Shakur. In 2021, Woodbine played Sheriff Domingo in Ghostbusters: Afterlife.

== Filmography ==
=== Film ===
Year	Title	Role	Notes
1994	Crooklyn	Richard	
1994	Jason's Lyric	Joshua Alexander	
1995	Panther	Tyrone	
1995	Dead Presidents	Staff Sgt. Cleon	
1996	Freeway	Chopper	
1996	The Rock	Gunnery Sergeant Crisp	
1996	The Elevator	Malcolm	
1997	Gridlock'd	Mud	
1998	Caught Up	Daryl Allen	
1998	The Big Hit	Crunch	
1998	Almost Heroes	Jonah	
1999	Wishmaster 2: Evil Never Dies	Mr. Farralon	Video
1999	Life	Can't Get Right	
1999	The Runner	477	
1999	It's the Rage	Agee	
2000	BlackMale	Jimmy Best	
2001	3000 Miles to Graceland	Benjamin Franklin	
2001	The Road to Graceland	Franklin (voice)	Short
2001	The Breed	FBI Agent Steve Grant	
2002	Run for the Money	Rock	
2002	Sniper 2	U.S. Army Sniper Jake Cole	Video
2003	Detonator	Jack Forrester	
2004	Ray	Fathead Newman	
2005	The Circle	Cop	
2005	Blood of a Champion	Shadow	Video
2005	Edmond	Prisoner	
2006	18 Fingers of Death!	Billy Buff	Video
2006	Confessions	Miles Adams	
2006	The Champagne Gang	Rock Star	
2007	The Last Sentinel	Anchilles	
2008	The Poker House	Duval	
2008	The Fifth Commandment	Miles Templeton	
2009	Black Dynamite	Black Hand Jack	
2009	A Day in the Life	Bam Bam	
2009	The Butcher	Chinatown Pete	
2009	Three Bullets	Bo	Short
2010	Devil	Benjamin "Ben" Larson, Guard	
2010	Across the Line: The Exodus of Charlie Wright	Miller	Video
2011	Little Murder	Lipp	
2011	License to Reproduce	DEA Agent Troy Peterson	Short
2012	Total Recall	Harry	
2012	Letting Go	Mark	
2013	Caught on Tape	Tyrone	
2013	The Host	Nate	
2013	Five Thirteen	Nestor	
2013	Riddick	Moss	
2013	1982	Scoop	
2013	They Die by Dawn	Bill Pickett	
2014	For Love or Money	Jacoby	
2014	Jarhead 2: Field of Fire	Danny Kettner	Video
2014	Guardian Angel	Detective Jackson	
2015	AWOL72	Myron	
2015	The Night Crew	Crenshaw	
2017	Spider-Man: Homecoming	Herman Schultz / Shocker #2	
2018	Billionaire Boys Club	Tim Pitt	
2018	Overlord	Sgt. Rensin	
2019	In the Shadow of the Moon	Maddox	
2019	Queen & Slim	Uncle Earl	
2020	Spenser Confidential	Driscoll	
2021	Ghostbusters: Afterlife	Sheriff Sherman Domingo	
2022	The Inspection	Leland Laws	
2023	Earth Mama	Paul	
2023	Old Dads	Mike Richards	
2026	Primetime	Cortland Gunn	

=== Television ===
Year	Title	Role	Notes
1993	CBS Schoolbreak Special	Steve Newberg	Episode: "Love Off Limits"
1993	Strapped	Diquan Mitchell	TV movie
1995	The X-Files	Sammom Roque	Episode: "The List"
1997	New York Undercover	Mobster	Episode: "No Place Like Hell"
1999	The Sopranos	Massive Genius	Episode: "A Hit Is a Hit"
2000	Battery Park	Detective Derek Finley	Main cast
2000	Soul Food	Detective Conrad	Episode: "Bad Luck"
2000	City of Angels	Dr. Damon Bradley	Recurring cast (season 2)
2000	Sacrifice	Agent Gottfried	TV movie
2003	Fastlane	Super G.	Episode: "Overkill"
2003	Jasper, Texas	Khalid X	TV movie
2004	CSI: Miami	Byron 'B-Slick' Middlebrook	Episode: "Pro Per"
2005	Black in the 80s	Himself	Main guest
2005	Bones	Randall Hall	Episode: "The Man in the Wall"
2006	The Evidence	Chaz Roberts	Episode: "Stringers"
2006	Blade: The Series	Steppin' Razor	Recurring cast
2007	Shark	Willy Tarver	Episode: "The Wrath of Khan"
2007	Law & Order: Criminal Intent	Gordon 'G-Man' Thomas	Episode: "Flipped"
2007–2009	Saving Grace	Leon Cooley	Main cast (season 1-2), guest (season 3)
2011	Flesh Wounds	Jackie	TV movie
2011–2012	Southland	Officer Jones	Recurring cast (season 3-4)
2013	Payday	Simmons	Episode: "The Elephant"
2014	The Fright Night Files	Isaiah	TV movie
2015	Battle Creek	Devin	Episode: "Old Wounds"
2015	Chicago P.D.	Derek Keyes	Episode: "Life Is Fluid"
2015	Life in Pieces	Officer Wood	Episode: "Sleepy Email Brunch Tree"
2015–2020	Fargo	Mike Milligan	Recurring cast (season 2), guest (season 4)
2016	Drunk History	George Washington	Episode: "Hamilton"
2017	Underground	Daniel	Recurring cast (season 2)
2017	Snowfall	Knees	Episode: "A Long Time Coming"
2018	Unsolved	Officer Daryn Dupree	Main cast
2019–2023	Wu-Tang: An American Saga	Jerome	Recurring cast (season 1-2), guest (season 3)
2022–2024	Halo	Soren-066	Main cast
2024	Ripley	Alvin McCarron	Miniseries, 2 episodes
2025	Invincible	Radcliffe (voice)	Episode: "A Deal with the Devil"
2025	Government Cheese	Bootsy	Main cast
2026	Diarra from Detroit	Cartier Kelly	Episode: "Michigan Jones and the Brightmoor Adventure"
2026	Dexter: Resurrection	Captain Mixon	Season 2 main cast

=== Music videos ===
Year	Title	Artist	Role
1995	"Waterfalls"	TLC	Himself
1995	"Just tah Let U Know"	Eazy-E	Himself
1996	"I Ain't Mad at Cha"	2Pac featuring Danny Boy	Friend
2000	"Gravel Pit"	Wu-Tang Clan	Bo Rockhard
2000	"Protect Ya Neck (The Jump Off)"	Wu-Tang Clan	B-Boy
2001	"Careful (Click, Click)"	Wu-Tang Clan	B-Boy
2003	"Light Your Ass on Fire"	Busta Rhymes	Friend

=== Video games ===
Year	Title	Voice role	Notes
2013	Payday 2	The Elephant	

== Awards and nominations ==
Year	Awards	Category	Recipient	Outcome
2016	Black Reel Awards	Outstanding Supporting Actor, TV Movie or Limited Series	Fargo	Won
2016	Critics' Choice Television Awards	Best Supporting Actor in a Movie/Miniseries	Fargo	Nominated
2016	Primetime Emmy Award	Outstanding Supporting Actor in a Limited or Anthology Series or Movie	Fargo	Nominated
