= List of Kirsten Dunst performances =

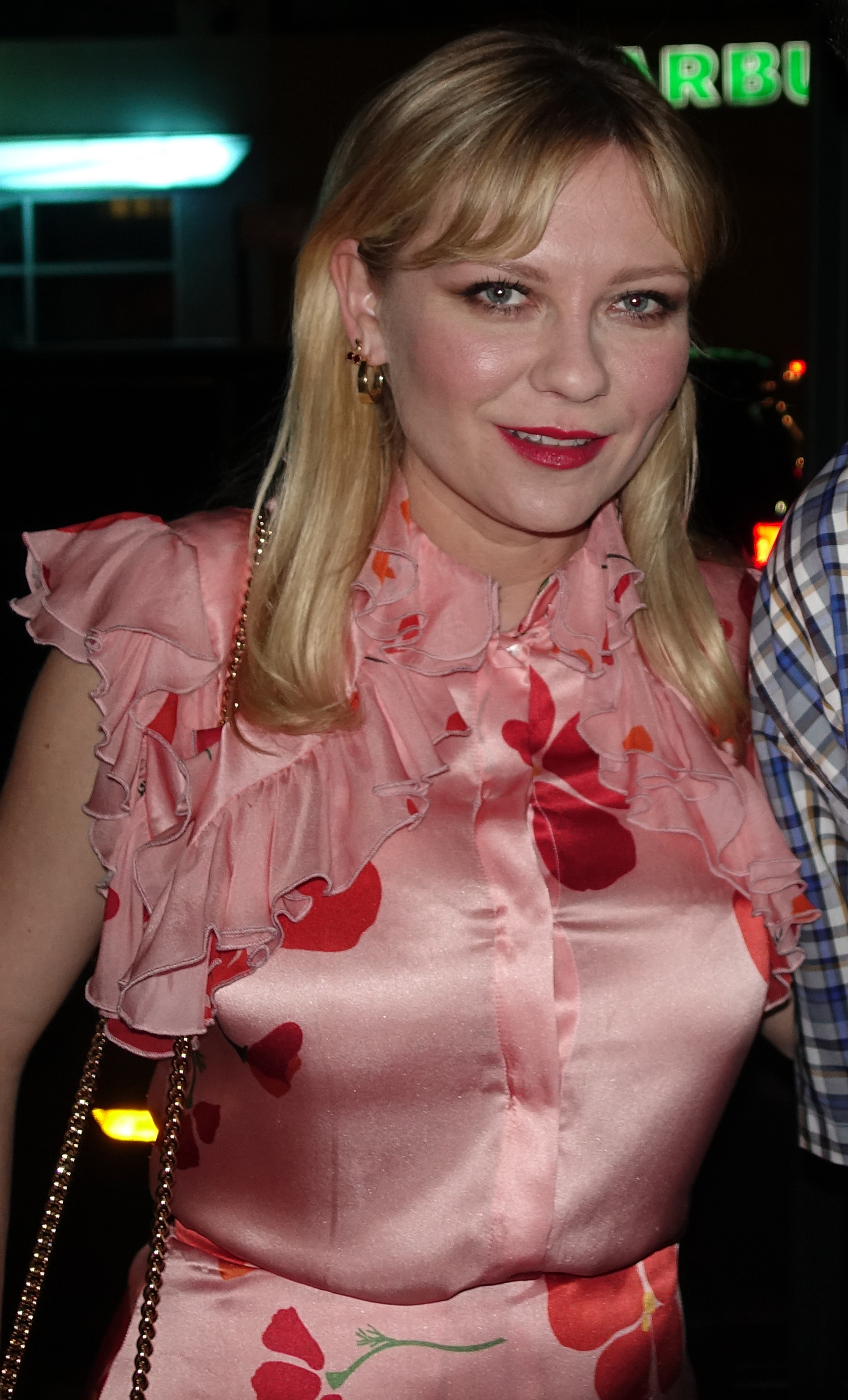
Dunst in 2017

Kirsten Dunst began her career as a child actress, appearing in small roles in Woody Allen's New York Stories (1989) and Brian De Palma's The Bonfire of the Vanities (1990). At age 12, she garnered widespread recognition for her portrayal of Claudia in the 1994 film adaptation of Interview with the Vampire, which earned her various critical accolades, including a Golden Globe nomination for Best Supporting Actress. Also in 1994, she portrayed young Amy March in the film adaptation of Little Women. She subsequently had roles in the youth fantasy films Jumanji (1995) and Small Soldiers (1998).

In the late 1990s, Dunst transitioned to leading roles in teen films, such as the satirical political comedy Dick, and the Sofia Coppola-directed drama The Virgin Suicides (both released in 1999), followed by the cheerleading comedy Bring It On (2000), and the drama Crazy/Beautiful (2001). She subsequently portrayed Marion Davies in Peter Bogdanovich's period drama The Cat's Meow (2001). Dunst gained a resurgence of mainstream attention for her role as Mary Jane Watson in Sam Raimi's Spider-Man (2002), a role which she reprised for the following two sequels. She had a minor part in Michel Gondry's psychological drama Eternal Sunshine of the Spotless Mind (2004), followed by a lead in Cameron Crowe's tragicomedy film Elizabethtown (2005), and as the title character in Coppola's Marie Antoinette (2006). In 2010, Dunst portrayed Katherine Marks, the missing wife of accused murderer Robert Durst, in the biographical crime film All Good Things (2010).

In 2011, Dunst starred in Lars von Trier's sci-fi drama Melancholia portraying a depressed newlywed, which earned her numerous accolades, including the Cannes Film Festival Award for Best Actress. She then had a supporting role in On the Road (2012), an adaptation of the Jack Kerouac novel, and appeared in the thriller The Two Faces of January (2014). In 2015, Dunst was cast as Peggy Blumquist in the second season of the FX series Fargo, which earned her multiple accolades, including a second Golden Globe nomination, this time in the category of Best Actress in a Series. She followed this with a supporting role in the biographical drama Hidden Figures (2016), and reunited again with Coppola for her remake of The Beguiled (2017). Dunst returned to television with a lead role in the black comedy series On Becoming a God in Central Florida, which she also executive-produced. She most recently starred in The Power of the Dog (2021), for which she earned a nomination for the Academy Award for Best Supporting Actress, and Civil War (2024).

== Film ==
Key
†	Denotes films that have not yet been released

List of film credits
Year	Title	Role	Notes	Ref.
1989	New York Stories	Lisa's Daughter		
1990	The Bonfire of the Vanities	Campbell McCoy		
1991	High Strung	Young Girl		
1994	Greedy	Jolene Ault		
1994	Interview with the Vampire	Claudia		
1994	Little Women	Younger Amy March		
1994	The Mystery of the Third Planet	Alisa Seleznyova	Voice; English dub	
1995	The Snow Queen	Gerda	Voice; English dub	
1995	Jumanji	Judy Shepherd		
1996	Mother Night	Young Resi Noth		
1997	Anastasia	Young Anastasia	Voice	
1997	Wag the Dog	Tracy Lime		
1998	Kiki's Delivery Service	Kiki	Voice; English dub	
1998	Small Soldiers	Christy Fimple		
1998	All I Wanna Do	Verena von Stefan		
1998	The Animated Adventures of Tom Sawyer	Becky Thatcher	Voice	
1999	True Heart	Bonnie		
1999	Drop Dead Gorgeous	Amber Atkins		
1999	The Virgin Suicides	Lux Lisbon		
1999	Dick	Betsy Jobs		
2000	The Crow: Salvation	Erin Randall		
2000	Luckytown	Lidda Doyles		
2000	Bring It On	Torrance Shipman		
2000	Deeply	Silly		
2001	Get Over It	Kelly Woods		
2001	Crazy/Beautiful	Nicole Oakley		
2001	The Cat's Meow	Marion Davies		
2001	Lover's Prayer	Zinaida		
2002	Spider-Man	Mary Jane Watson		
2003	Levity	Sofia Mellinger		
2003	Kaena: The Prophecy	Kaena	Voice; English dub	
2003	Mona Lisa Smile	Betty Warren		
2004	Eternal Sunshine of the Spotless Mind	Mary Svevo		
2004	Spider-Man 2	Mary Jane Watson		
2004	Wimbledon	Lizzie Bradbury		
2005	Elizabethtown	Claire Colburn		
2006	Marie Antoinette	Marie Antoinette		
2007	Welcome	—N/a	Short film; writer and director	
2007	Spider-Man 3	Mary Jane Watson		
2008	How to Lose Friends and Alienate People	Alison Olsen		
2010	All Good Things	Katie Marks / Katherine McCarthy		
2010	The Second Bakery Attack	Nat	Short film	
2010	Bastard	—N/a	Short film; writer and director	
2011	Fight for Your Right Revisited	Metal Chick	Short film	
2011	Touch of Evil	The Siren	Short film	
2011	Melancholia	Justine		
2012	Bachelorette	Regan Crawford		
2012	On the Road	Camille Moriarty		
2012	Upside Down	Eden Moore		
2013	The Bling Ring	Herself	Uncredited cameo	
2013	Anchorman 2: The Legend Continues	El Trousias Maiden of the Clouds	Cameo	
2014	The Two Faces of January	Collette MacFarland		
2014	Aspirational	Herself	Short film	
2016	Midnight Special	Sarah Tomlin		
2016	Hidden Figures	Vivian Mitchell		
2017	The Beguiled	Edwina Dabney		
2017	Woodshock	Theresa		
2021	The Power of the Dog	Rose Gordon		
2024	Civil War	Lee Smith		
2025	Roofman	Leigh Wainscott		
2026	Making Marie Antoinette	Herself	Documentary film	
2027	A Minecraft Movie Squared †	Alex	Post-production	
2027	The Housemaid's Secret †	Wendy Garrick	Filming	
TBA	The Entertainment System Is Down †	TBA	Post-production	

== Television ==
List of television credits
Year	Title	Role	Notes	Ref.
1993	Darkness Before Dawn	Sandra Guard (age 8)	Television film	
1993	Sisters	Kitten Margolis	Episodes: "Dear Georgie", "The Land of the Lost Children"	
1993	Star Trek: The Next Generation	Hedril	Episode: "Dark Page"	
1996	The Siege at Ruby Ridge	Sara Weaver	Television film	
1996	Touched by an Angel	Amy Ann McCoy	Episode: "Into the Light"	
1996–1997	ER	Charlie Chiemingo	6 episodes	
1997	Tower of Terror	Anna Petterson	Television film	
1997	The Outer Limits	Joyce Taylor	Episode: "Music of the Spheres"	
1997	Gun	Sondra	Episode: "The Hole"	
1998	Stories from My Childhood	Alice / Ivett	Voice; 2 episodes	
1998	Fifteen and Pregnant	Tina Spangler	Television film	
1999	The Devil's Arithmetic	Hannah Stern	Television film	
2002	Saturday Night Live	Herself	Host; episode: "Kirsten Dunst/Eminem"	
2014	Cosmos: A Spacetime Odyssey	Cecilia Payne-Gaposchkin	Voice; episode: "Sisters of the Sun"	
2014	Portlandia	Kim	Episode: "Sharing Finances"	
2015	Fargo	Peggy Blumquist	10 episodes	
2017	Black Mirror	Callister Employee	Uncredited cameo; episode: "USS Callister"	
2018	Drunk History	Agatha Christie	Episode: "Drunk Mystery"	
2019	On Becoming a God in Central Florida	Krystal Stubbs	10 episodes; also executive producer	

== Video games ==
List of video game credits
Year	Title	Role	Notes	Ref.
2004	Spider-Man 2: The Video Game	Mary Jane Watson	Voice role	

== Music videos ==
List of music video credits
Year	Track	Artist	Notes	Ref.
1999	"I Knew I Loved You"	Savage Garden		
2000	"The Itch"	Vitamin C		
2000	"The Best Things"	Filter		
2009	"Turning Japanese"	Kirsten Dunst	Recorded for Pop Life: Art in a Material World exhibition	
2011	"We All Go Back to Where We Belong"	R.E.M.		

== Discography ==
List of music credits
Year	Title	Album
1994	"For the Beauty of the Earth" ft. Trini Alvarado and Claire Danes	Little Women (Original Motion Picture Soundtrack)
1999	"Spit It Out" ft. Allison Janney	Drop Dead Gorgeous: Motion Picture Soundtrack
2001	"Dream of Me"	Get Over It: Music from the Miramax Motion Picture
2001	"The Girl Inside"	Get Over It: Music from the Miramax Motion Picture
2002	"After You've Gone"	The Cat's Meow Original Motion Picture Soundtrack
2007	"This Old Machine"	Nighttiming by Coconut Records
2007	"Summer Day"	Nighttiming by Coconut Records

== See also ==
- List of awards and nominations received by Kirsten Dunst
