= Kirsten Dunst =

American actress and singer (born 1982)

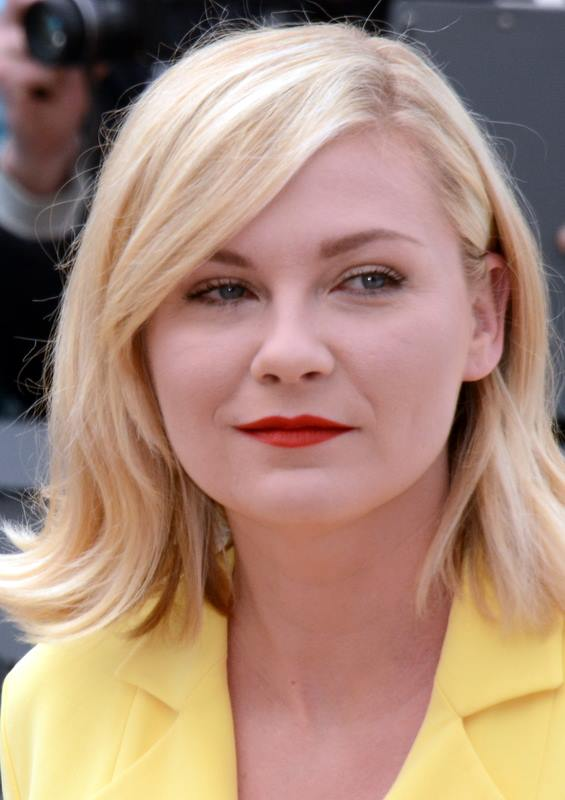
- Dunst in 2016
- Born: Kirsten Caroline Dunst; April 30, 1982 (age 44); Point Pleasant, New Jersey, U.S.
- Citizenship: United States; Germany
- Occupations: Actress; singer
- Years active: 1985–present
- Works: Full list
- Spouse: Jesse Plemons (m. 2022)
- Children: 2
- Awards: Full list

Kirsten Caroline Dunst (Note: Pronunciation of "Kirsten": /ˈkɪərstən/, KEER-stən) (born April 30, 1982) is an American actress and singer who has starred in many film and television productions. Her accolades include the Cannes Film Festival Award For Best Actress and nominations for an Academy Award, a Primetime Emmy Award, and four Golden Globes.

As a child, Dunst made her acting debut in the anthology film New York Stories (1989). She gained recognition as the child vampire Claudia in the horror film Interview with the Vampire (1994), which earned her nomination for the Golden Globe Award for Best Supporting Actress. Other roles in her youth include Little Women (1994), Jumanji (1995) and Small Soldiers (1998). Dunst moved into leading roles in teen films of 1999: the satires Dick and Drop Dead Gorgeous, as well as the drama The Virgin Suicides, the first of her several collaborations with filmmaker Sofia Coppola. After starring in the comedy film Bring It On (2000), she gained wider attention for her role as Mary Jane Watson in Sam Raimi's Spider-Man trilogy (2002–2007). She played supporting roles in Mona Lisa Smile (2003) and Eternal Sunshine of the Spotless Mind (2004), followed by lead roles in Wimbledon (2004), Elizabethtown (2005), and Coppola's Marie Antoinette (2006).

In 2011, Dunst starred as a depressed newlywed in Lars von Trier's drama Melancholia, which earned her the Best Actress award at the 2011 Cannes Film Festival. In 2015, she starred as the hairdresser Peggy Blumquist in the second season of the FX series Fargo, which earned her nominations for the Primetime Emmy Award and Golden Globe Award for Best Actress in a Limited or Anthology Series or Television Movie. Dunst had a supporting role in the film Hidden Figures (2016) and leading roles in Coppola's The Beguiled (2017) and in the dark comedy series On Becoming a God in Central Florida (2019). She was nominated for the Golden Globe Award and the Academy Award for Best Supporting Actress for her performance as a troubled wife in Jane Campion's psychological drama The Power of the Dog (2021).

Following a two-year hiatus from acting, Dunst starred in the dystopian thriller film Civil War (2024) and co-starred with Channing Tatum in the true-crime drama Roofman (2025). Dunst is married to actor Jesse Plemons and they have two sons.

== Early life ==
Dunst was born on April 30, 1982, at Point Pleasant Hospital in Point Pleasant, New Jersey. Her father, Klaus Dunst, worked for Siemens as a medical services executive, and her mother, Inez (née Rupprecht) worked for Lufthansa as a flight attendant. Inez was also an artist and a one-time gallery owner. Dunst's father is German, originally from Hamburg, and her American mother is of German and Swedish descent. Dunst has a younger brother. Until the age of eleven, Dunst lived in Brick Township, New Jersey, and attended Ranney School in Tinton Falls.

In 1993, Dunst moved to Los Angeles with her mother and brother, after her parents separated. In her teens, she found it difficult to cope with her rising fame, and for a time she was angry with her mother for pushing her into acting as a child. However, she later said her mother "always had the best intentions". When asked in 2005 if she had any regrets about her childhood, Dunst said, "Well, it's not a natural way to grow up, but it's the way I grew up and I wouldn't change it."

== Acting career ==
=== 1985–1993: Early work ===
Dunst began her career at age three as a child fashion model in television commercials. She was signed with Ford Models and Elite Model Management. In 1988, she appeared on Saturday Night Live as the granddaughter of George H. W. Bush. Later that year, she made her feature film debut with a minor role in Woody Allen's short film Oedipus Wrecks, which was released as one-third of the anthology film New York Stories (1989). Soon after, Dunst performed in the comedy-drama The Bonfire of the Vanities (1990), based on Tom Wolfe's novel The Bonfire of the Vanities, in which she played the daughter of Tom Hanks' character. In 1993, Dunst made a guest appearance in an episode of the science fiction series Star Trek: The Next Generation.

=== 1994–2001: Career breakthrough ===
Dunst's breakthrough role came in 1994, in the horror drama Interview with the Vampire, based on Anne Rice's novel Interview with the Vampire. She played Claudia, a child vampire who is a surrogate daughter to the characters played by Tom Cruise and Brad Pitt. The film included a scene in which Dunst shared her first onscreen kiss with Pitt, who is two decades her senior. She stated that kissing him had made her feel uncomfortable: "I thought it was gross, that Brad had cooties. I mean, I was 10," she recalled. Roger Ebert considered her portrayal of Claudia to be one of the "creepier" aspects of the film, and praised her portrayal of great age inside apparent youth. Janet Maslin of The New York Times said Dunst was "scarily effective" in her role and called her a "little vamp with a big future." For her performance, Dunst won the MTV Movie Award for Best Breakthrough Performance and the Saturn Award for Best Young Actress, in addition to receiving a Golden Globe Award nomination for Best Supporting Actress. (Note: Attributed to multiple references:) Interview with the Vampire received mixed reviews. Later in 1994, Dunst co-starred in the drama film Little Women. It received positive reviews, with Maslin calling Dunst's performance "scene-stealing".

In 1995, Dunst starred in the fantasy adventure film Jumanji, a loose adaptation of Chris Van Allsburg's 1981 children's book Jumanji. The story is about a supernatural board game which makes real animals and jungle hazards appear with each roll of the dice. Dunst was part of an ensemble cast that included Robin Williams, Bonnie Hunt and David Alan Grier. The film was a financial success and grossed $262 million worldwide. In that year, and again in 2002, Dunst was named one of People magazine's 50 Most Beautiful People.

In 1996–1997, Dunst had a recurring role in season three of the NBC medical drama series ER. She played Charlie Chemingo, a child prostitute who is being cared for by the pediatrician Dr. Doug Ross, played by George Clooney. In 1997, Dunst voiced Young Anastasia in the animated musical film Anastasia and appeared in the black comedy film Wag the Dog with Robert De Niro and Dustin Hoffman. The following year she starred in Small Soldiers and voiced Kiki in the English Disney/GKIDS dub of Studio Ghibli's Kiki's Delivery Service. She also starred in Sarah Kernochan's period comedy All I Wanna Do (1998), playing a student at an all girls' boarding school in the 1960s, alongside Gaby Hoffmann, Rachael Leigh Cook, and Lynn Redgrave. Writing for The New York Times, A. O. Scott called Dunst's performance "smart" and "unstereotyped".

Dunst turned down the role of Angela Hayes in American Beauty (1999) because, at 15 years old, she did not want to appear in the film's sexual scenes, and she did not fully understand the mature themes of the script. In 1999, she appeared in three films: Drop Dead Gorgeous, a mockumentary about a small town beauty pageant in which she starred; Dick, a comedic parody which retells the events of the Watergate scandal, in which she co-starred; and Sofia Coppola's drama The Virgin Suicides, based on Jeffrey Eugenides' 1993 novel The Virgin Suicides, in which Dunst played the troubled teenager Lux Lisbon. The Virgin Suicides received generally favorable reviews, (Note: Attributed to multiple references:) with Peter Stack of the San Francisco Chronicle writing that Dunst "beautifully balances innocence and wantonness". The same year, Dunst appeared in Savage Garden's music video "I Knew I Loved You", the first single from their album Affirmation (1999).

In 2000, Dunst starred in the comedy Bring It On as Torrance Shipman, the captain of a cheerleading squad. The film garnered mostly positive reviews, with A. O. Scott calling Dunst "a terrific comic actress, largely because of her great expressive range, and the nimbleness with which she can shift from anxiety to aggression to genuine hurt". Charles Taylor of Salon wrote that "among contemporary teenage actresses, Dunst has become the sunniest imaginable parodist". Jessica Winter of The Village Voice said Dunst was "as sprightly and knowingly daft" as she was in Dick. Peter Stack of the San Francisco Chronicle praised Dunst for her willingness "to be as silly and cloyingly agreeable as it takes to get through a slapdash film".

In 2001, Dunst starred in the comedy film Get Over It. She later explained that she took the role for the opportunity to showcase her singing. The same year, she co-starred with Jay Hernandez in the teen romance film Crazy/Beautiful. Roger Ebert of the Chicago Sun-Times called it "an unusually observant film about adolescence", and "because of the real conviction that Dunst and Hernandez bring to the roles, we care about them as people, not case studies." Dunst also starred as actress Marion Davies in the historical drama The Cat's Meow, directed by Peter Bogdanovich. Derek Elley of Variety deemed Dunst's performance the best of her career: "Believable as both a spoiled ingenue and a lover to two very different men, Dunst endows a potentially lightweight character with considerable depth and sympathy". For her performance, Dunst won the Best Actress Silver Ombú award at the 2002 Mar del Plata International Film Festival.

=== 2002–2009: Stardom with Spider-Man ===
In 2002, Dunst starred opposite Tobey Maguire in Sam Raimi's superhero film Spider-Man, the most financially successful film of her career at the time. She played Mary Jane Watson, the love interest of Peter Parker (Maguire). Owen Gleiberman of Entertainment Weekly said Dunst had the ability to "lend even the smallest line a tickle of flirtatious music". Writing for the Los Angeles Times, Kenneth Turan thought Dunst and Maguire made a genuine connection onscreen which "involved audiences to an extent rarely seen in films". Spider-Man was a critical and commercial success, grossing $114 million during its opening weekend in North America and earning $822 million worldwide.

Dunst next co-starred with Billy Bob Thornton, Morgan Freeman and Holly Hunter in the drama Levity (2003), a story of a man who is released on parole and returns to his hometown seeking redemption. The same year, she co-starred with Julia Roberts, Maggie Gyllenhaal and Julia Stiles in the drama Mona Lisa Smile (2003), which received mixed reviews; Manohla Dargis of the Los Angeles Times described it as "smug and reductive". Dunst then co-starred with Jim Carrey, Kate Winslet and Tom Wilkinson in Michel Gondry's film Eternal Sunshine of the Spotless Mind (2004), which received positive reviews and grossed $72 million worldwide. (Note: Attributed to multiple references:) Owen Gleiberman of Entertainment Weekly described Dunst's subplot as "nifty and clever".

The success of the first Spider-Man led Dunst to reprise her role as Mary Jane Watson in Spider-Man 2 (2004). The film received generally positive reviews and was a commercial success, setting a new opening weekend box office record for North America. With a total gross of $783 million worldwide, it was the second highest-grossing film of 2004. The same year, Dunst co-starred opposite Paul Bettany in the romantic comedy Wimbledon, in which she portrayed a tennis player competing in the Wimbledon Championships. The film received mixed reviews. Claudia Puig of USA Today described the chemistry between Dunst and Bettany as "potent", and that Dunst did a "fine job as a sassy and self-assured player".

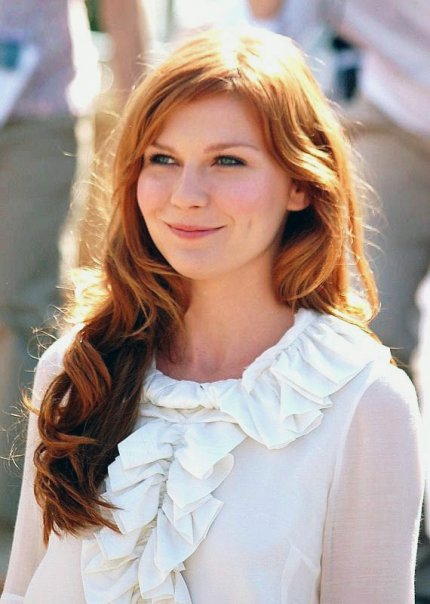
Dunst at the 2006 Cannes Film Festival

In Dunst's sole project of 2005, she starred opposite Orlando Bloom in Cameron Crowe's romantic tragicomedy Elizabethtown as a flight attendant. The film premiered at the 2005 Toronto International Film Festival and received mixed reviews, with Michael Phillips of the Chicago Tribune describing Dunst's performance as "cloying". After Elizabethtown, Dunst collaborated with Sofia Coppola again, starring as Marie Antoinette in the historical drama Marie Antoinette (2006), based on Antonia Fraser's book Marie Antoinette: The Journey. The film was screened at a special presentation at the 2006 Cannes Film Festival, and was reviewed favorably. It grossed $60 million from a budget of $40 million.

In 2007, Dunst reprised the role of Mary Jane Watson in Spider-Man 3, which received a mixed reaction from critics. Ryan Gilbey of the New Statesman criticized Dunst's character, remarking that "the film-makers couldn't come up with much for Mary Jane to do other than scream a lot". With a worldwide gross of $891 million, it is the most commercially successful film in the series, and was Dunst's highest-grossing film to date. In 2008, Dunst starred opposite Simon Pegg in the comedy How to Lose Friends & Alienate People, based on Toby Young's memoir of the same name. The film received generally negative reviews. Robert Wilonsky of The Village Voice was critical of Dunst's performance, writing that she seemed to be "speaking in four different accents at once, none of them quite of the English variety".

=== 2010–2016: Independent films ===
Dunst made her screenwriting and directorial debut with the short film Bastard, which she co-wrote with Sasha Sagan. The film premiered at the Tribeca Film Festival in 2010 and was later featured at the 2010 Cannes Film Festival. Dunst co-starred opposite Ryan Gosling in the mystery drama All Good Things (2010), based on the true story of New York real estate developer Robert Durst, whose wife disappeared in 1982. The film mixed reviews and earned $640,000 worldwide. The critic Roger Ebert praised Dunst for her ability to portray "a woman at a loss to understand who her husband really is, and what the true nature of his family involves". Mick LaSalle of the San Francisco Chronicle said her performance was the only one worth watching in the film. Also in 2010, Dunst co-starred with Brian Geraghty in Carlos Cuarón's short film The Second Bakery Attack, based on Haruki Murakami's short story.

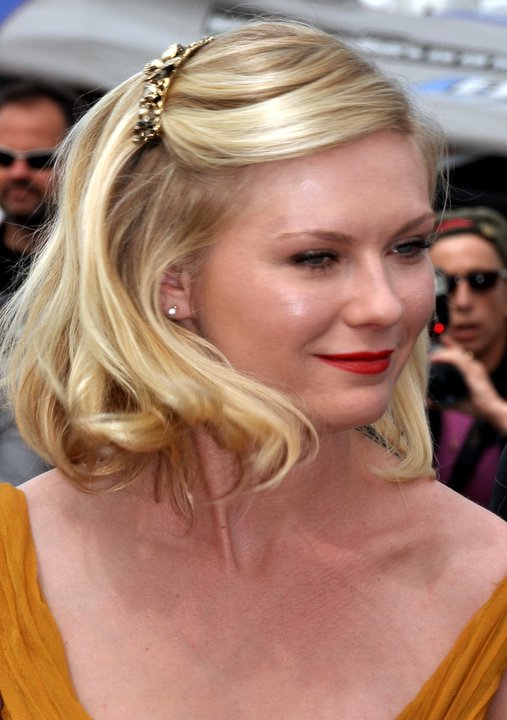
Dunst at the 2011 Cannes Film Festival

In 2011, Dunst co-starred with Charlotte Gainsbourg, Kiefer Sutherland and Charlotte Rampling in Lars von Trier's drama film Melancholia as a woman suffering depression as the world ends. The film premiered at the 2011 Cannes Film Festival and received generally positive reviews, with Dunst's performance earning praise. Steven Loeb of Southampton Patch said the film brought the best out of Dunst, who plays "a character unlike any other she has ever attempted". He felt her performance alone was enough to recommend the film, which he called "an incredible work of art". Sukhdev Sandhu of The Daily Telegraph wrote: "Dunst is exceptional, so utterly convincing in the lead role ... that it feels like a career breakthrough." Dunst won several awards for her performance, including the Best Actress Award at Cannes and the Best Actress Award from the U.S. National Society of Film Critics.

Dunst made a cameo in the Beastie Boys' 2011 music video "Fight For Your Right Revisited", which premiered at the Sundance Film Festival. A year later, she starred in Juan Diego Solanas' science fiction romance Upside Down with Jim Sturgess. The film received generally negative reviews, with Peter Howell of the Toronto Star writing that it had no character development and that Dunst brought "competence but no passion to her underwritten roles". Next, Dunst had a role in Leslye Headland's romantic comedy Bachelorette (2012), which starred Isla Fisher, Rebel Wilson and Lizzy Caplan. Dunst played Regan Crawford, one of three women who reunite for the wedding of a friend who was ridiculed in high school. The same year, Dunst played Camille Moriarty in the drama On the Road (2012), an adaptation of Jack Kerouac's 1957 novel On the Road. Dunst had been approached for the role several years prior by the film's director Walter Salles. The film premiered at the 2012 Cannes Film Festival and underperformed at the box office while earning mixed reviews.

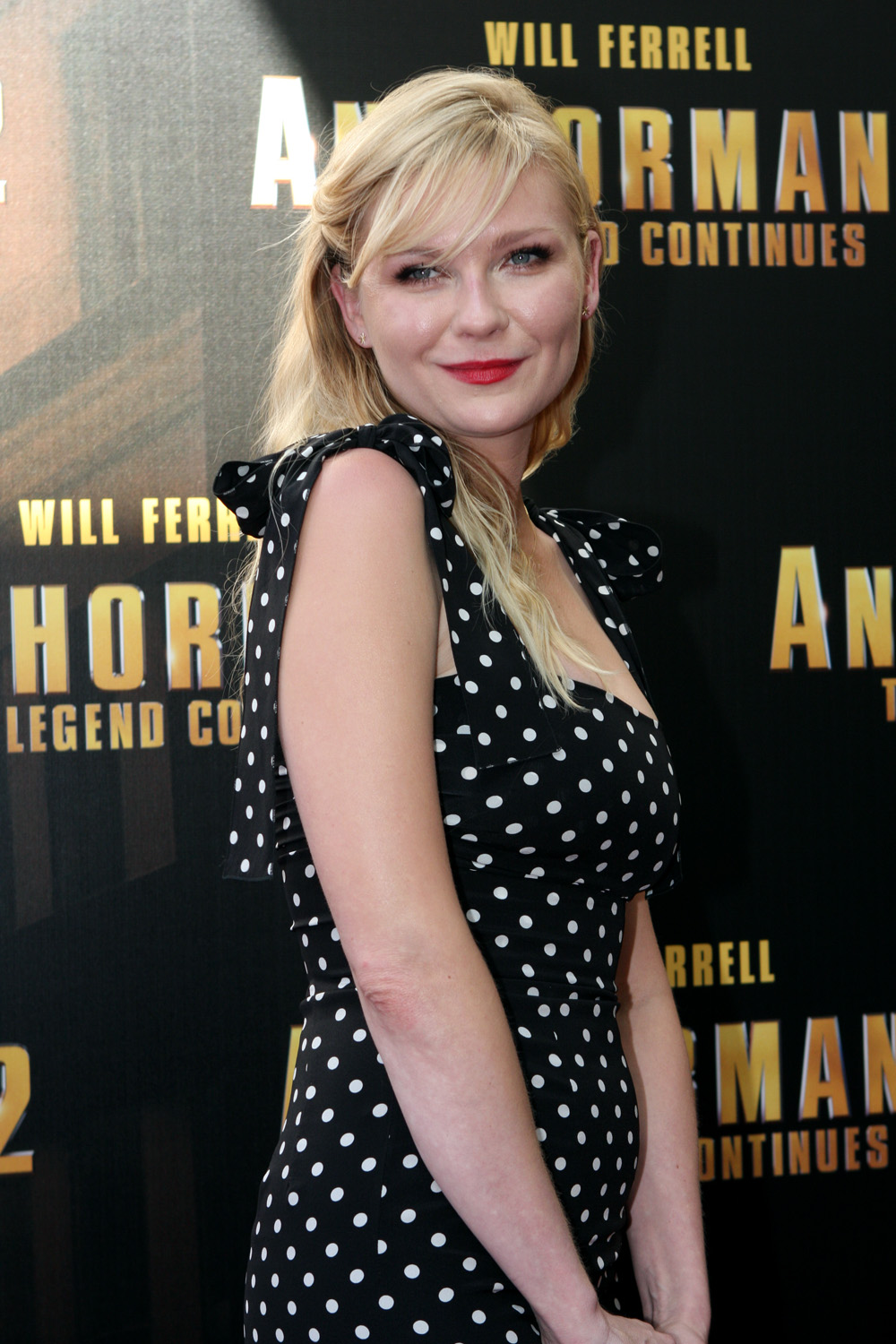
Dunst attended the Australian premiere of Anchorman 2 in 2013.

Dunst's next major role came in Hossein Amini's thriller The Two Faces of January (2014), in which she starred as Colette, the wife of a con artist, alongside Viggo Mortensen and Oscar Isaac. The film was based on Patricia Highsmith's 1964 novel The Two Faces of January. It received mostly favorable reviews, with Betsy Sharkey of the Los Angeles Times writing that Dunst "brings a potent complexity to Colette; every mood shift registers to the bone". Jake Wilson of The Sydney Morning Herald described Dunst as "typically teasing yet sympathetic". Also in 2014, Dunst voiced a character in the eighth episode of Cosmos: A Spacetime Odyssey, and made a guest appearance in an episode of Portlandia. Throughout 2015, Dunst focused solely on television work. She played the hairdresser Peggy Blumquist in the second season of the FX comedy-drama Fargo, which earned her nominations for the Golden Globe Award for Best Actress and the Primetime Emmy Award for Outstanding Lead Actress in a Limited Series or Movie.

In 2016, Dunst co-starred in Jeff Nichols' science fiction drama Midnight Special with Michael Shannon and Joel Edgerton. The story is about a father and his eight-year-old son who go on the run after discovering that the boy possesses mysterious powers. The film opened to mostly positive reviews. Tim Grierson of The New Republic questioned the purpose of Dunst's character, writing that she "has nothing to do". Dunst had a supporting role in the biographical drama Hidden Figures (2016), a loose adaptation of the book Hidden Figures by Margot Lee Shetterly. The story follows African-American mathematicians who worked at NASA during the Space Race. Catherine Shoard of The Guardian felt that Dunst's role as a white supervisor was underdeveloped, although her performance drew praise from Elise Nakhnikian of Slant Magazine. The film was a commercial success, grossing $236 million worldwide and earning nominations for three Academy Awards. The cast won the Screen Actors Guild Award for Outstanding Performance by a Cast in a Motion Picture. At the 2016 Cannes Film Festival, Dunst served as a member of the main competition jury. The same year, it was announced that Dunst would direct an adaptation of Sylvia Plath's novel The Bell Jar, starring Dakota Fanning. However, Dunst left the project before production began.

=== 2017–present: Award nominations and upcoming projects ===
Dunst had two film releases in 2017. She starred alongside Colin Farrell, Nicole Kidman and Elle Fanning in the drama The Beguiled, a remake of Don Siegel's 1971 film The Beguiled, about a wounded Union soldier who seeks shelter at an all-girls' school in the Confederate States of America. It was her third collaboration with Sofia Coppola, who wrote and directed the film. The Beguiled received generally favorable reviews, with Matthew Norman of the Evening Standard writing that Dunst "lends the ideal measure of coiled physical longing to her prim spinster". Dunst then starred in the psychological thriller Woodshock, written and directed by Kate and Laura Mulleavy. The film is about a woman who falls into deep paranoia after taking a deadly drug. The Mulleavys, who were friends of Dunst, personally approached her for the role. Dunst prepared for the part over the course of a year, undertaking dream experiments to try to inhabit the character's state of mind. Woodshock received mostly negative reviews from critics, although Guy Lodge of Variety wrote that Dunst portrayed "irretrievably inverted depression to riveting effect".

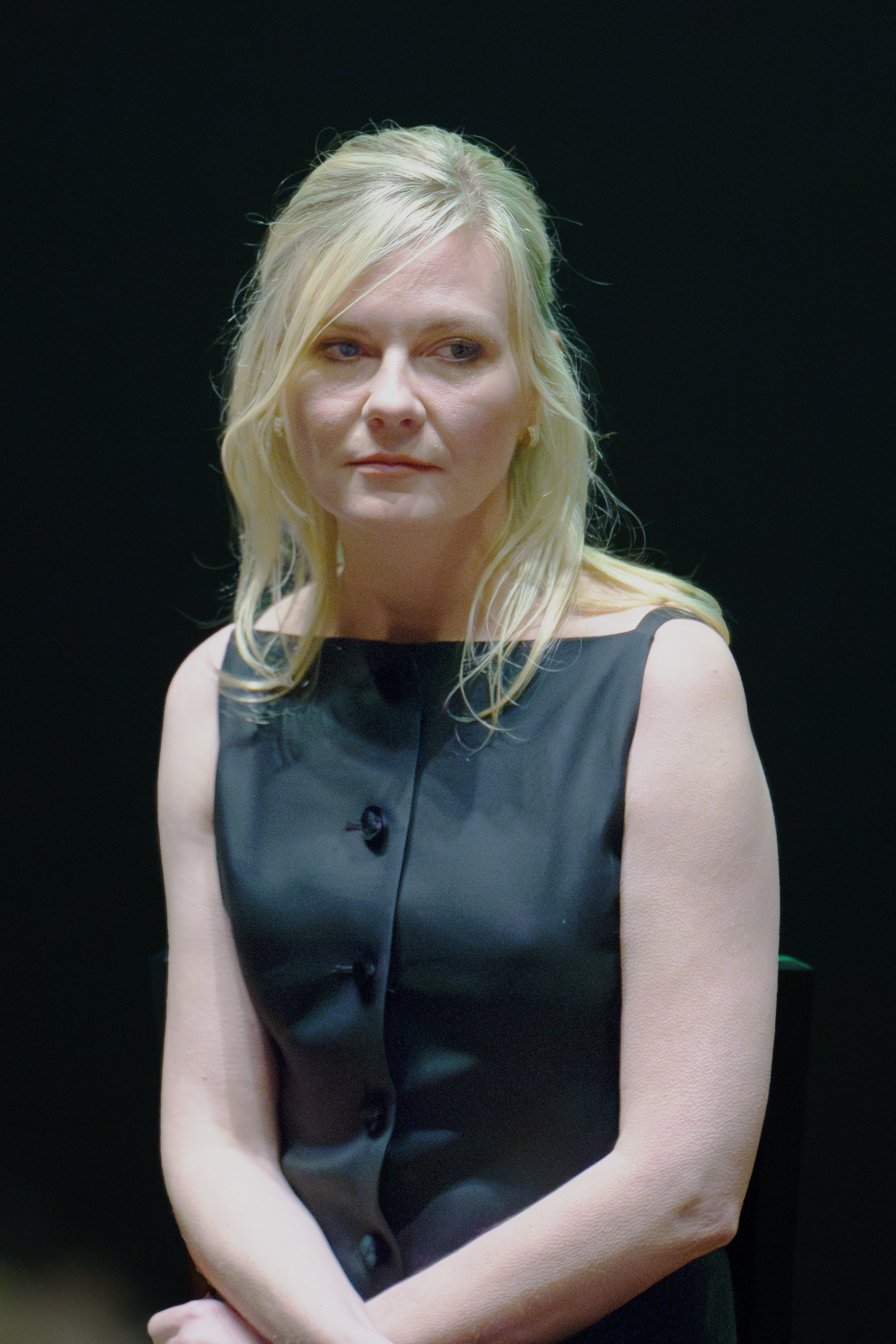
Dunst at the premiere of Civil War in 2024

In 2019, Dunst received a star on the Hollywood Walk of Fame and starred in the Showtime dark comedy television series On Becoming a God in Central Florida, which earned her nominations for the Golden Globe Award for Best Actress and the Critics Choice Award for Best Actress in a Comedy Series. (Note: Attributed to multiple references:) The series was renewed for a second season but was canceled in 2020 due to the COVID-19 pandemic. In 2021, Dunst co-starred with her then-fiancé Jesse Plemons in Jane Campion's film The Power of the Dog, which was distributed by Netflix and given a limited theatrical release in the United States. (Note: Attributed to multiple references:) Dunst received Academy Award, Golden Globe Award, and Screen Actors Guild Award nominations for Best Supporting Actress along with two Critics' Choice Award nominations—Best Supporting Actress and Best Acting Ensemble. Following the film's release, Dunst took a two-year hiatus from acting because she was only being offered the role of "the sad mom", and was struggling to find roles that resonated with her as she aged.

Dunst was approached by director Alex Garland to star in his dystopian thriller film Civil War. She eagerly agreed to play the world-weary photojournalist Lee Smith because it was unlike any of her previous roles. The film, which was released in 2024, was a critical and commercial success. (Note: Attributed to multiple references:) In 2025, Dunst starred opposite Channing Tatum in Derek Cianfrance's true-crime drama Roofman, a film about the criminal Jeffrey Manchester, who hid inside a Toys "R" Us store for six months after escaping prison. She played Leigh Wainscott, a divorced mother who falls in love with Manchester. The film premiered at the 2025 Toronto International Film Festival and received generally positive reviews. Mark Hughes of Forbes called Dunst's performance the best of her career, writing that her "charm and charisma [are] mixed perfectly with a naturalist realism and skepticism lurking beneath the surface."

==== Upcoming projects ====
Dunst and Mikey Madison will star in Alejandro Landes Echavarría's thriller Reptilia. Dunst is set to play Alex in the 2027 film A Minecraft Movie Squared, which is the sequel to A Minecraft Movie (2025). (Note: Attributed to multiple references:) She will star in The Housemaid's Secret, which is a sequel to The Housemaid (2025) and which will be directed by Paul Feig and feature Sydney Sweeney. Two more of Dunst's upcoming films, Ruben Östlund's satirical comedy The Entertainment System Is Down and Charlie McDermott's drama Rhubarb, are in post-production. (Note: Attributed to multiple references:)

== Music career ==
In 2001, Dunst made her singing debut in the comedy film Get Over It, performing two songs written by Marc Shaiman. She performed the jazz standard "After You've Gone" by Henry Creamer and Turner Layton, which was used during the end credits of The Cat's Meow. In Spider-Man 3, she sang two songs as Mary Jane Watson, one during a Broadway performance and the other in a jazz club. Dunst recorded the songs earlier and lip-synced while filming. She appeared in the music videos for Savage Garden's "I Knew I Loved You", Beastie Boys' "Make Some Noise" and R.E.M.'s "We All Go Back to Where We Belong", and she sang two tracks, "This Old Machine" and "Summer Day", on Jason Schwartzman's 2007 solo album Nighttiming. The same year, Dunst said she had no intention to release her own albums, remarking: "It worked when Barbra Streisand was doing it, but now it's a little cheesy, I think. It works better when singers are in movies".

Dunst starred as the magical princess Majokko in the short film Akihabara Majokko Princess, directed by Takashi Murakami and McG. The film shows Dunst dancing around Akihabara, a shopping district in Tokyo, Japan, and singing a cover of The Vapors' 1980 song "Turning Japanese". The film was shown at the "Pop Life" exhibition in London's Tate Modern gallery between October 2009 and January 2010. (Note: Attributed to multiple references:)

== Other activities ==
In 2002, Dunst helped design and promote a necklace that was sold to raise money for the Elizabeth Glaser Pediatric AIDS Foundation. In 2008, she participated in the Stand Up to Cancer telethon to raise funds for cancer research. The following year, she participated in the Teletón in Mexico to raise awareness about cancer treatment and children's rehabilitation.

Dunst has supported various Democratic candidates in U.S. presidential elections, including John Kerry (2004), Barack Obama (2008), and Bernie Sanders (2020). She directed and narrated the documentary Why Tuesday, which explores the tradition of voting on Tuesdays in the United States and the country's low voter turnout.

== Personal life ==
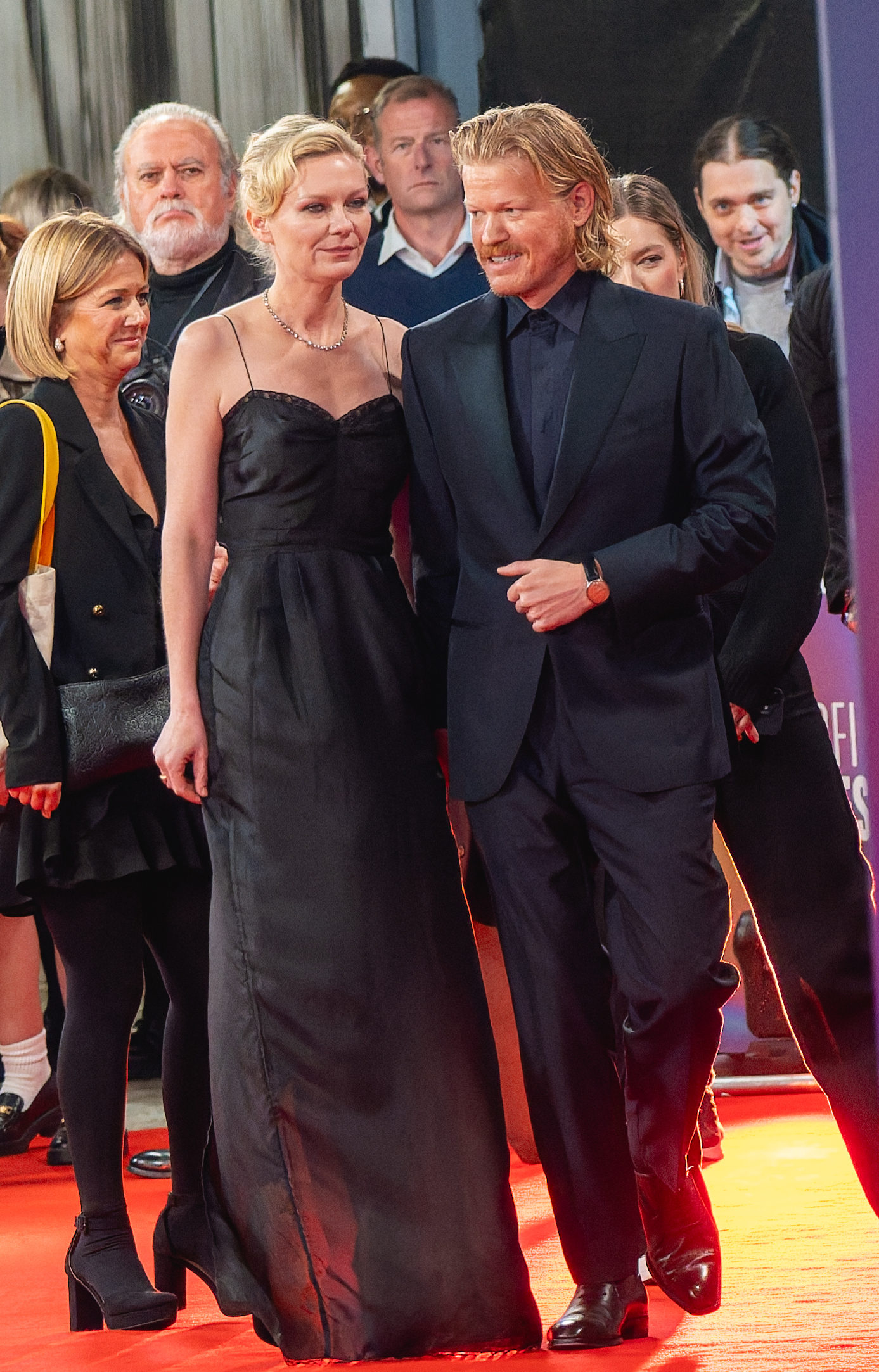
Dunst and her husband Jesse Plemons at the premiere of his film Bugonia in 2025

In 2001, Dunst dated her Spider-Man co-star Tobey Maguire; they separated the following year but remained friends and co-stars. Dunst was in a relationship with Jake Gyllenhaal from 2002 to 2004, and with her On the Road co-star Garrett Hedlund from 2012 to 2016. Dunst and Hedlund were briefly engaged before eventually separating.

Dunst began a relationship with her Fargo co-star Jesse Plemons in 2016, and they became engaged in 2017. They have two sons, born in 2018 and 2021. Dunst and Plemons were married in July 2022 at a resort in Ocho Rios, Jamaica. As of 2021, they were living in the San Fernando Valley area of Los Angeles, California. Dunst is a Christian and had both of her children baptized. In 2011, she acquired German citizenship to allow her to film in Europe more easily.

In early 2008, Dunst was treated for depression at the Cirque Lodge treatment center in Utah. In late March of that year, she left the treatment center and began filming All Good Things. Two months later, she went public with this information to dispel rumors that she was being treated for substance abuse.
