= List of awards and nominations received by Kirsten Dunst =

Kirsten Dunst awards and nominations
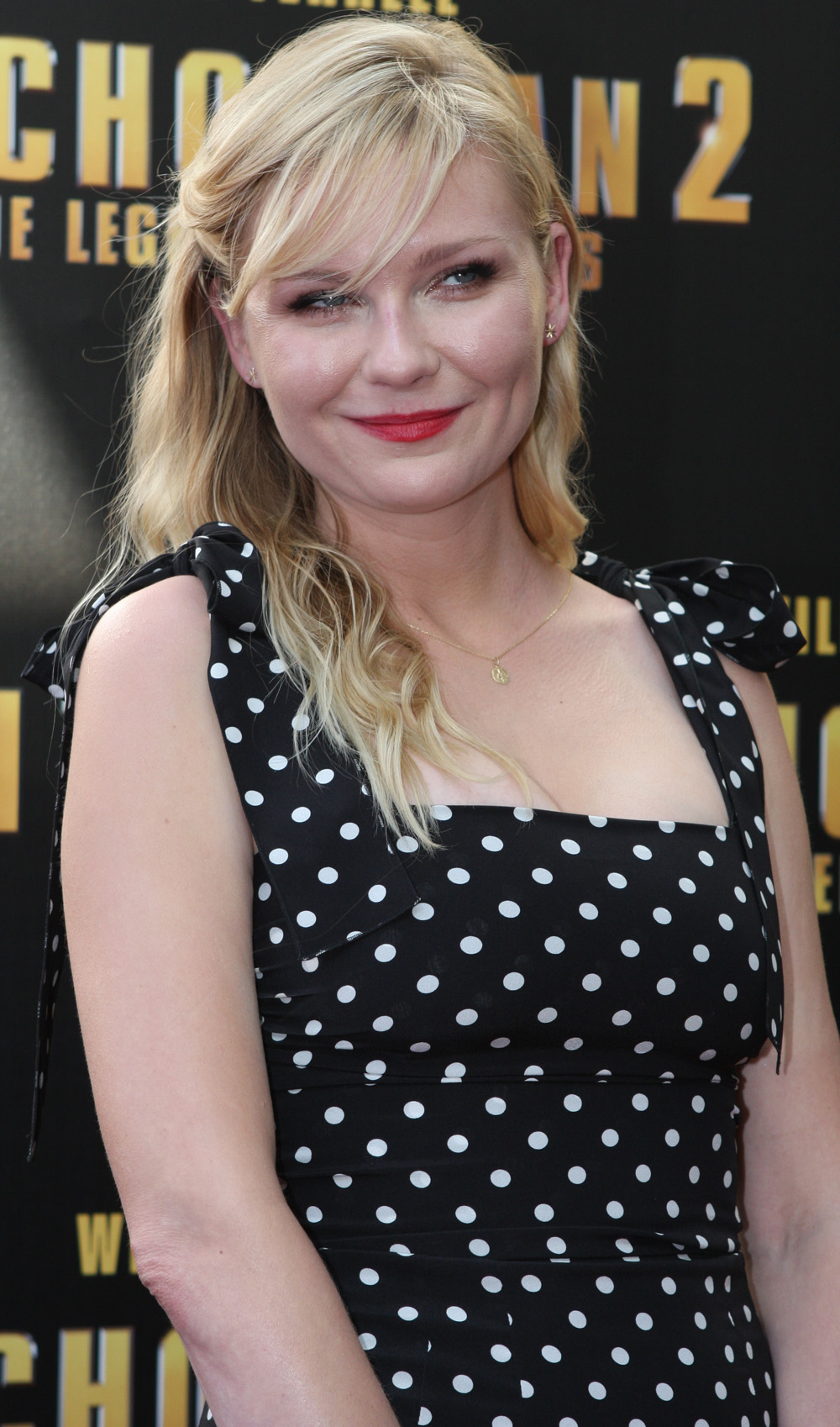
- Dunst in 2014
Awards and nominations
Award	Wins	Nominations
Academy Awards	0	1
AACTA Awards	0	3
Blockbuster Entertainment Awards	0	1
Bodil Awards	0	1
Cannes Film Festival Awards	1	0
Critics' Choice Movie Awards	0	3
Critics' Choice Television Awards	1	1
Empire Awards	1	1
European Film Awards	0	1
Independent Spirit Awards	0	1
Golden Globe Awards	0	4
Nickelodeon Kids' Choice Awards	0	1
Mar del Plata Film Festival	1	0
MTV Movie Awards	3	1
People's Choice Awards	0	2
Primetime Emmy Awards	0	1
Robert Awards	1	0
Sant Jordi Awards	1	0
Satellite Awards	3	1
Saturn Awards	2	2
Screen Actors Guild Awards	1	1
Teen Choice Awards	1	5
Young Artist Awards	2	5
YoungStar Awards	3	3
Critics' associations	21	41

Totals (Note: Certain award groups do not simply award one winner. They acknowledge several different recipients, have runners-up, and have third place. Since this is a specific recognition and is different from losing an award, runner-up mentions are considered wins in this award tally. For simplification and to avoid errors, each award in this list has been presumed to have had a prior nomination.)
- Wins: 42
- Nominations: 77

Kirsten Dunst is an American actress who has received numerous accolades, including a Cannes Film Festival Award, a Screen Actors Guild Award, a Critics' Choice Television Award, three Satellite Awards, and two Saturn Awards, in addition to various other nominations.

A child actor, Dunst first came to critical notice for her portrayal of Claudia in Interview with the Vampire (1994), which, at age 12, earned her a Golden Globe nomination for Best Supporting Actress, as well as accolades from the Chicago and Boston Societies of Film Critics. She gained further accolades for her role in Little Women, released the same year, including a Best Supporting Actress win from the Boston Society of Film Critics. Dunst went on to appear in a variety of teen films throughout the late 1990s, and garnered a mainstream resurgence for her role as Mary Jane Watson in Spider-Man (2002), as well as its second and third sequels.

In 2011, Dunst received critical acclaim for her performance as a depressed newlywed in Lars von Trier's science fiction drama Melancholia, winning the Cannes Film Festival Award for Best Actress, as well as a Sant Jordi Award and Robert Award; she also received an AACTA nomination, and multiple awards from various international critics' associations. Dunst received further critical recognition for her portrayal of Peggy Blumquist on the network series Fargo in 2015, winning the Satellite Award for Best Actress, as well as nominations for the Primetime Emmy Award for Outstanding Lead Actress in a Limited Series or Movie, and the Golden Globe for Best Actress – Miniseries or Television Film. The following year, she won a Screen Actors Guild Award for Best Ensemble as part of the cast in the biographical drama Hidden Figures.

In 2021, Dunst received critical acclaim for her performance in The Power of the Dog, for which she was nominated for the Golden Globe Award, SAG Award, and the Academy Award for Best Supporting Actress, among other numerous awards.

== Major associations ==
=== Academy Awards ===
The Academy Awards, commonly known as the "Oscars", are a set of awards given by the Academy of Motion Picture Arts and Sciences annually for excellence of cinematic achievements.

Year	Nominated work	Category	Result	Ref.
2022	The Power of the Dog	Best Supporting Actress	Nominated	

=== Cannes Film Festival ===
Cannes Film Festival, is an annual film festival held in Cannes, France, which previews new films of all genres, including documentaries, from all around the world.

Year	Nominated work	Category	Result	Ref.
2011	Melancholia	Best Actress	Won	

=== Golden Globe Awards ===
The Golden Globe Award is an accolade bestowed by the 93 members of the Hollywood Foreign Press Association (HFPA) recognizing excellence in film and television, both domestic and foreign.

Year	Nominated work	Category	Result	Ref.
1995	Interview with the Vampire	Best Supporting Actress – Motion Picture	Nominated	
2016	Fargo	Best Actress – Miniseries or Television Film	Nominated	
2020	On Becoming a God in Central Florida	Best Actress – Television Series Musical or Comedy	Nominated	
2022	The Power of the Dog	Best Supporting Actress – Motion Picture	Nominated	

=== Primetime Emmy Awards ===
The Primetime Emmy Awards are presented annually by the Academy of Television Arts & Sciences, also known as the Television Academy, to recognize and honor achievements in the television industry.

Year	Nominated work	Category	Result	Ref.
2016	Fargo	Outstanding Lead Actress in a Limited Series or a Movie	Nominated	

=== Screen Actors Guild Awards ===
The Screen Actors Guild Awards are organized by the Screen Actors Guild‐American Federation of Television and Radio Artists. First awarded in 1995, the awards aim to recognize excellent achievements in film and television.

Year	Nominated work	Category	Result	Ref.
2017	Hidden Figures	Outstanding Performance by a Cast in a Motion Picture	Won (Note: Shared with the cast)	
2022	The Power of the Dog	Outstanding Performance by a Female Actor in a Supporting Role	Nominated	

== Miscellaneous awards ==
=== AACTA International Awards ===
The Australian Academy of Cinema and Television Arts Awards are presented annually by the Australian Academy of Cinema and Television Arts (AACTA) to recognize and honor achievements in the film and television industry.

Year	Nominated work	Category	Result	Ref.
2011	Melancholia	Best Actress	Nominated	
2021	The Power of the Dog	Best Supporting Actress	Nominated	
2024	Civil War	Best Actress	Nominated	

=== Blockbuster Entertainment Awards ===
Year	Nominated work	Category	Result	Ref.
2001	Bring It On	Favorite Actress - Comedy	Nominated	

=== Bodil Awards ===
The Bodil Awards are the major Danish film awards presented annually by Danish Film Critics Association. Established in 1948, it is one of the oldest film awards in Europe.

Year	Nominated work	Category	Result	Ref.
2011	Melancholia	Best Actress in a Leading Role	Nominated	

=== Critics' Choice Movie Awards ===
The Critics' Choice Movie Awards are presented annually since 1995 by the Broadcast Film Critics Association for outstanding achievements in the cinema industry.

Year	Nominated work	Category	Result	Ref.
2017	Hidden Figures	Best Acting Ensemble	Nominated	
2022	The Power of the Dog	Best Supporting Actress	Nominated	
2022	The Power of the Dog	Best Acting Ensemble	Nominated	

=== Critics' Choice Television Awards ===
The Critics' Choice Television Awards are presented annually since 2011 by the Broadcast Television Journalists Association. The awards were launched "to enhance access for broadcast journalists covering the television industry".

Year	Nominated work	Category	Result	Ref.
2015	Fargo	Best Actress in a Movie/Miniseries	Won	
2019	On Becoming a God in Central Florida	Best Actress in a Comedy Series	Nominated	

=== Critics' Choice Super Awards ===
Year	Category	Nominated work	Result	Ref.
2025	Best Actress in an Action Movie	Civil War	Nominated	

=== Empire Awards ===
The Empire Awards is a British awards ceremony held annually to recognize cinematic achievements.

Year	Nominated work	Category	Result	Ref.
2002	Spider-Man	Best Actress	Won	
2004	Spider-Man 2	Best Actress	Nominated	

=== European Film Awards ===
The European Film Awards have been presented annually since 1988 by the European Film Academy to recognize excellence in European cinematic achievements.

Year	Nominated work	Category	Result	Ref.
2011	Melancholia	Best Actress	Nominated	

=== Independent Spirit Awards ===
The Independent Spirit Awards are presented annually by Film Independent, to award best in the independent film community.

Year	Nominated work	Category	Result	Ref.
2026	Roofman	Best Supporting Performance	Nominated	

=== Kids' Choice Awards ===
The Nickelodeon Kids' Choice Awards is an annual American children's awards ceremony show established in 1988 by Nickelodeon, with winners chosen by public vote.

Year	Nominated work	Category	Result	Ref.
2008	Spider-Man 3	Favorite Female Movie Star	Nominated	

=== Mar del Plata Film Festival ===
The Mar del Plata International Film Festival is held annually in Mar del Plata, Argentina, organized by the National Institute of Cinema and Audiovisual Arts (INCAA).

Year	Nominated work	Category	Result	Ref.
2001	The Cat's Meow	Best Actress	Won	

=== MTV Movie Awards ===
The MTV Movie Awards is an annual award show presented by MTV to honor outstanding achievements in films. Founded in 1992, the winners of the awards are decided online by the audience.

Year	Nominated work	Category	Result	Ref.
1995	Interview with the Vampire	Best Breakthrough Performance	Won	
2001	Bring It On	Best Dance Sequence	Nominated (Note: Shared with Lindsay Sloane, Clare Kramer, Nicole Bilderback, Tsianina Joelson, Rini Bell, Bianca Kajlich, Nathan West, and Huntley Ritter)	
2003	Spider-Man	Best Female Performance	Won	
2003	Spider-Man	Best Kiss	Won (Note: Shared with Tobey Maguire)	

=== People's Choice Awards ===
The People's Choice Awards is an American awards show recognizing the people and the work of popular culture. The show has been held annually since 1975, and is voted on by the general public.

Year	Nominated work	Category	Result	Ref.
2002	Spider-Man	Favorite On Screen Chemistry	Nominated	
2004	Spider-Man 2	Favorite On Screen Match Up	Nominated	

=== Robert Awards ===
The Robert Awards are held annually in Denmark by the Danish Film Academy, honoring achievements in film.

Year	Nominated work	Category	Result	Ref.
2011	Melancholia	Best Actress in a Leading Role	Won	

=== Sant Jordi Awards ===
The Sant Jordi Awards are film prizes awarded annually in Barcelona by the Catalonia region of the Spanish radio network Radio Nacional de España.

Year	Nominated work	Category	Result	Ref.
2011	Melancholia	Best Foreign Actress	Won	

=== Satellite Awards ===
The Satellite Awards are a set of annual awards given by the International Press Academy.

Year	Nominated work	Category	Result	Ref.
2015	Fargo	Best Actress — Television Series Drama	Nominated	
2016	Hidden Figures	Best Cast — Motion Picture	Won	
2022	The Power of the Dog	Best Supporting Actress	Won	
2022	The Power of the Dog	Best Cast — Motion Picture	Won	

=== Saturn Awards ===
The Saturn Awards are presented annually by the Academy of Science Fiction, Fantasy, and Horror Films to honor science fiction, fantasy, and horror films, television, and home video.

Year	Nominated work	Category	Result	Ref.
1994	Interview with the Vampire	Best Performance by a Younger Actor	Won	
1995	Jumanji	Best Performance by a Younger Actor	Nominated	
2002	Spider-Man	Best Actress	Nominated	
2011	Melancholia	Best Actress	Won	

=== Teen Choice Awards ===
The Teen Choice Awards is an annual awards show that airs on the Fox Network. The awards honor the year's biggest achievements in music, movies, sports, television, fashion, and other categories, voted by teen viewers.

Year	Nominated work	Category	Result	Ref.
1999	—	Choice Movie Actress	Nominated	
2000	The Virgin Suicides	Choice Movie Actress	Nominated	
2001	Get Over It	Choice Movie Chemistry	Nominated (Note: Shared with Ben Foster)	
2002	Spider-Man	Choice Movie Liplock	Won	
2003	Mona Lisa Smile	Choice Movie Villain	Nominated	
2007	Spider-Man 3	Choice Movie Liplock	Nominated	

=== Young Artist Awards ===
The Young Artist Award is an accolade presented by the Young Artist Association, a non-profit organization founded in 1978 to honor excellence of youth performers, and to provide scholarships for young artists who may be physically disabled or financially unstable.

Year	Nominated work	Category	Result	Ref.
1994	Little Women	Best Supporting Actress — Feature Film	Won	
1995	Jumanji	Best Leading Actress – Feature Film	Won	
1996	ER	Best Guest Starring Actress — Drama Series	Nominated	
1997	Tower of Terror	Best Leading Actress — TV Movie/Pilot/Mini-Series	Nominated	
1998	Small Soldiers	Best Leading Actress – Feature Film	Nominated	
1999	The Devil's Arithmetic	Best Actress – TV Movie/Pilot/Mini-Series	Nominated	
2000	Bring It On	Best Leading Actress — Feature Film	Nominated	

=== YoungStar Awards ===
The YoungStar Awards were presented annually between 1995 and 2000 by The Hollywood Reporter, honoring young American actors and actresses from ages 6–18 in their work in film, television, stage and music.

Year	Nominated work	Category	Result	Ref.
1994	Interview with the Vampire	Best Actress — Drama Film	Won	
1996	ER	Best Actress — TV Drama Series	Nominated	(Note: Dunst's biographical entry at the Cannes Film Festival lists her nomination for the series under its French title, Urgences.)
1996	The Siege at Ruby Ridge	Best Actress — Television Film	Won	
1998	Fifteen and Pregnant	Best Actress — Miniseries or Television Film	Won	(Note: Dunst's biographical entry at the Cannes Film Festival lists her nomination for the film under its French title, Un choix difficile (English: A Difficult Choice).)
1999	Dick	Best Actress — Comedy Film	Nominated	
1999	The Virgin Suicides	Best Actress — Drama Film	Nominated	

== Critics associations ==
Year	Nominated work	Association	Category	Result	Ref.
1994	Interview with the Vampire	Boston Society of Film Critics	Best Supporting Actress	Won	
1994	Interview with the Vampire	Chicago Film Critics Association	Most Promising Actress	Won	
1994	Interview with the Vampire	Chicago Film Critics Association	Best Supporting Actress	Nominated	
1994	Little Women	Boston Society of Film Critics	Best Supporting Actress	Won	
2004	Eternal Sunshine of the Spotless Mind	Washington D.C. Area Film Critics Association	Best Ensemble	Won	
2011	Melancholia	Alliance of Women Film Journalists	Best Actress	Won	
2011	Melancholia	Central Ohio Film Critics Association	Best Actress	Nominated	
2011	Melancholia	Chicago Film Critics Association	Best Actress	Nominated	
2011	Melancholia	Dallas-Fort Worth Film Critics Association	Best Actress	Nominated	
2011	Melancholia	Denver Film Critics Society	Best Actress	Nominated	
2011	Melancholia	Kansas City Film Critics Circle	Best Actress	Won	
2011	Melancholia	London Film Critics' Circle	Actress of the Year	Nominated	
2011	Melancholia	National Society of Film Critics	Best Actress	Won	
2011	Melancholia	Online Film Critics Society	Best Actress	Nominated	
2016	Hidden Figures	African-American Film Critics Association	Best Ensemble	Won	
2016	Hidden Figures	Florida Film Critics Circle	Best Ensemble	Nominated	
2016	Hidden Figures	Georgia Film Critics Association	Best Ensemble	Nominated	
2016	Hidden Figures	Women Film Critics Circle	Best Ensemble	Won	
2021	The Power of the Dog	Alliance of Women Film Journalists	Best Supporting Actress	Won	
2021	The Power of the Dog	Atlanta Film Critics Circle	Best Supporting Actress	Won	
2021	The Power of the Dog	Austin Film Critics Association	Best Supporting Actress	Won	
2021	The Power of the Dog	Boston Online Film Critics Association	Best Supporting Actress	Won	
2021	The Power of the Dog	Chicago Indie Critics	Best Supporting Actress	Nominated	
2021	The Power of the Dog	Chicago Indie Critics	Best Ensemble	Nominated	
2021	The Power of the Dog	Columbus Film Critics Association	Best Supporting Actress	Runner-up	
2021	The Power of the Dog	Columbus Film Critics Association	Best Ensemble	Won	
2021	The Power of the Dog	Dallas–Fort Worth Film Critics Association	Best Supporting Actress	Runner-up	
2021	The Power of the Dog	Denver Film Critics Society	Best Supporting Actress	Nominated	
2021	The Power of the Dog	Detroit Film Critics Society	Best Supporting Actress	Nominated	
2021	The Power of the Dog	Florida Film Critics Circle	Best Supporting Actress	Nominated	
2021	The Power of the Dog	Florida Film Critics Circle	Best Ensemble	Nominated	
2021	The Power of the Dog	Georgia Film Critics Association	Best Supporting Actress	Nominated	
2021	The Power of the Dog	Georgia Film Critics Association	Best Ensemble	Nominated	
2021	The Power of the Dog	Hawaii Film Critics Society	Best Supporting Actress	Nominated	
2021	The Power of the Dog	Houston Film Critics Society	Best Supporting Actress	Nominated	
2021	The Power of the Dog	Houston Film Critics Society	Best Ensemble	Nominated	
2021	The Power of the Dog	Iowa Film Critics Association	Best Supporting Actress	Runner-up	
2021	The Power of the Dog	Las Vegas Film Critics Society	Best Supporting Actress	Nominated	
2021	The Power of the Dog	London Film Critics' Circle	Supporting Actress of the Year	Nominated	
2021	The Power of the Dog	Music City Film Critics Association	Best Supporting Actress	Nominated	
2021	The Power of the Dog	New York Film Critics Online	Best Ensemble	Won	
2021	The Power of the Dog	North Dakota Film Society	Best Supporting Actress	Won	
2021	The Power of the Dog	North Carolina Film Critics Association	Best Supporting Female	Nominated	
2021	The Power of the Dog	North Carolina Film Critics Association	Best Acting Ensemble	Nominated	
2021	The Power of the Dog	Oklahoma Film Critics Circle	Best Supporting Actress	Won	
2021	The Power of the Dog	Oklahoma Film Critics Circle	Best Ensemble	Runner-up	
2021	The Power of the Dog	Online Association of Female Film	Best Supporting Female	Runner-up	
2021	The Power of the Dog	Online Association of Female Film	Best Acting Ensemble	Nominated	
2021	The Power of the Dog	Online Film Critics Society	Best Supporting Actress	Won	
2021	The Power of the Dog	Phoenix Critics Circle	Best Supporting Actress	Won	
2021	The Power of the Dog	Portland Critics Association	Best Female Supporting Role	Nominated	
2021	The Power of the Dog	San Francisco Bay Area Film Critics Circle	Best Supporting Actress	Won	
2021	The Power of the Dog	Seattle Film Critics Society	Best Actress in a Supporting Role	Nominated	
2021	The Power of the Dog	Seattle Film Critics Society	Best Ensemble Cast	Nominated	
2021	The Power of the Dog	Southeastern Film Critics Association	Best Supporting Actress	Won	
2021	The Power of the Dog	St. Louis Gateway Film Critics Association Awards	Best Supporting Actress	Nominated	
2021	The Power of the Dog	Toronto Film Critics Association	Best Supporting Actress	Runner-up	
2021	The Power of the Dog	Washington D.C. Area Film Critics Association	Best Supporting Actress	Nominated	
2021	The Power of the Dog	Washington D.C. Area Film Critics Association	Best Ensemble	Nominated	
2024	Civil War	Hollywood Creative Alliance	Best Actress	Nominated	
2024	Civil War	Indiana Film Journalists Association	Best Leading Performance	Nominated	
2024	Civil War	Indiana Film Journalists Association	Best Ensemble Acting	Nominated	
