= Kate and Laura Mulleavy =

American fashion designers

Kate Mulleavy
- Born: Katherine Marie Mulleavy; February 11, 1979 (age 46); Oakland, California, U.S.
- Years active: 2005–present

Laura Mulleavy
- Born: August 31, 1980 (age 45); Pasadena, California, U.S.
- Years active: 2005–present

Katherine "Kate" Mulleavy (born February 11, 1979) and Laura Mulleavy (born August 31, 1980) are American fashion designers and filmmakers who founded the fashion label Rodarte in 2005. In addition to their work in fashion, the sisters have also ventured into film, writing and directing their first feature, Woodshock (2017), as well as co-designing costumes in the 2010 horror film Black Swan.

== Early life ==
Katherine Marie Mulleavy was born in 1979 in Oakland, California, and her sister, Laura Mulleavy, was born the following year in Pasadena. They were raised in Northern California, growing up in Aptos, a town near Santa Cruz. Their mother, Victoria Rodart, is an artist of Mexican-Italian ancestry, and their father, William Perry Mulleavy, is a mycologist of Irish descent. Both sisters attended the University of California, Berkeley with Laura studying English literature and Kate studying art history.

== Rodarte ==
In 2001, the sisters graduated from the University of California, Berkeley and returned to their family home in Pasadena, California, where they began to work on establishing their own clothing line, waitressing and selling personal items to accrue funds. The sisters founded the fashion line Rodarte, it was named after the original Spanish pronunciation of their mother's maiden name, Rodart. They began independently, crafting a capsule collection of seven dresses and two coats in 2004. Their work was featured in a February 2005 issue of Women's Wear Daily, which caught the attention of Vogue editor Anna Wintour, who traveled to Los Angeles to meet with the sisters in person. Wintour became a public supporter of the label, featuring their work in numerous issues of Vogue.

In 2007 and 2009, respectively, Rodarte produced two limited-run lines of clothing with Gap and Target.

== Film and other ventures ==
In 2010, the Mulleavy sisters had their first foray into film, collaborating with costume designer Amy Westcott on some of the costumes for the movie Black Swan. In May 2015, the sisters announced that they had written a film script entitled Woodshock which was purchased by distribution company A24; the film, released in September 2017, stars Kirsten Dunst.

== See also ==
- Rodarte
- Woodshock
