= The Two Faces of January =

Psychological thriller novel by Patricia Highsmith

- First edition
- Author: Patricia Highsmith
- Cover artist: Polly Cameron
- Language: English language
- Genre: Psychological thriller
- Publisher: Doubleday
- Publication date: 1964
- Publication place: United States
- OCLC: 16923778
- Dewey Decimal: 813/.54 19
- LC Class: PS3558.I366 T8 1988

The Two Faces of January (1964) is a psychological thriller novel by Patricia Highsmith. Its title alludes to the two faces of the Roman god Janus, after whom the month of January was named. Biographer Andrew Wilson, in his 2003 publication Beautiful Shadow: A Life of Patricia Highsmith claims the title is 'appropriate for the janus-faced, flux-like nature of her protagonists'.

== Plot outline ==
Chester MacFarland is an alcoholic con artist traveling in Greece with his young wife, Colette. In Athens, a private detective questions McFarland, who accidentally kills him during a struggle in his hotel room. A recent acquaintance, a young American law graduate and poet named Rydal Keener, decides to help them, in part because McFarland reminds him of his recently deceased father, from whom he was estranged, and Colette of his cousin Agnes, with whom Rydal was in love. He helps McFarland and Colette hide the body and leave Athens under false passports procured by his friend Niko, a local street vendor.

The trio take a flight to Crete and install themselves in a hotel under assumed names. Colette flirts with a smitten Keener in front of McFarland, whose jealousy eventually gets the better of him. On a rainy morning, while they visit the palace of Knossos, MacFarland tries to kill Keener by throwing a pithos at him from above, but accidentally kills Colette instead. Both MacFarland and Keener separately flee the scene undetected and take the same boat back to Athens, now more dependent on each other than ever.

Back in Athens, MacFarland is interviewed by the police, and states that Keener murdered Colette. At the same time, he hires a contract killer to get rid of Keener once and for all. However, MacFarland is unaware that the "hitman", whom he pays in advance, is in fact a florist whom Keener paid to set him up. Keener goes into hiding from the police, while MacFarland procures another false passport and books a flight to Paris.

MacFarland learns from his accomplices that he is wanted in the U.S. over a Ponzi scheme. Nevertheless, he believes that going back to America and starting afresh under a new name is the only option left to him. Keener, who McFarland had assumed was dead, suddenly reappears and blackmails him. Unbeknownst to McFarland, Keener is working with the police to get him to confess to Colette's murder. Leaving behind all his possessions except his cash stuffed into his pockets, McFarland travels by taxi to Lyon and then on to Marseille, where he intends to depart for America.

While waiting for his boat, MacFarland gets drunk in a bar and is mugged, robbed of everything except his overcoat. In his stupor, he is arrested and identified by the French police. In custody, MacFarland gets hold of a guard's pistol, fires at him, and is shot in turn. As he dies, MacFarland takes responsibility for Colette's death, exonerating Keener. After the police clear Keener of any wrongdoing, he promises to go to MacFarland's funeral service out of gratitude.

== Reception ==
The UK-based Crime Writers' Association named The Two Faces of January the Best Crime Novel (foreign) for 1964. Writing in The New York Times, Anthony Boucher called it "an offbeat, provocative and absorbing suspense novel".

== Adaptations ==
A first screen adaptation of the novel was filmed in Germany in 1986, as Die zwei Gesichter des Januar. The second adaptation of the novel was released in 2014. It was written and directed by Hossein Amini, and starred Viggo Mortensen, Kirsten Dunst and Oscar Isaac.
