= Woodshock =

2017 psychological thriller drama film

- Theatrical release poster
- Directed by: Kate Mulleavy; Laura Mulleavy
- Written by: Kate Mulleavy; Laura Mulleavy
- Produced by: Michael Costigan; Ken Kao; Ben LeClair; K.K. Barrett
- Starring: Kirsten Dunst; Joe Cole; Pilou Asbæk
- Cinematography: Peter Flinckenberg
- Edited by: Dino Jonsater; Julia Bloch
- Music by: Peter Raeburn
- Production companies: Waypoint Entertainment; COTA Films; Bloom
- Distributed by: A24
- Release dates: September 4, 2017 (Venice Film Festival); September 22, 2017 (U.S.)
- Running time: 100 minutes
- Country: United States
- Language: English
- Budget: $5 million
- Box office: $43,682

Woodshock is a 2017 American psychological thriller drama film written and directed by Kate and Laura Mulleavy, in their joint feature directorial debut. It stars Kirsten Dunst, Joe Cole, and Pilou Asbæk. The plot follows a woman who, reeling after the loss of her mother, begins to cope with her grief by using a powerful substance which has hallucinogenic, violent repercussions.

Inspired by the Redwood forests of Northern California, the Mulleavy sisters co-wrote the script for the film for two years. Woodshock was filmed on location in Humboldt County, California in the summer of 2015. Kirsten Dunst, who prepared for the role for a year, also served as the film's executive producer. The film had its world premiere at the 74th Venice International Film Festival, before receiving a limited release in the United States on September 22, 2017 by A24.

== Plot ==
Theresa provides her terminally-ill mother a cannabis joint laced with poison, allowing her to commit assisted suicide. After her mother's death, she inherits her home in rural Northern California. Theresa's boyfriend, Nick, wants her to move elsewhere with him, but she insists on staying in her mother's house. Theresa returns to her job at a cannabis dispensary owned by her friend Keith, but is noticeably withdrawn. She attends a house party with Keith, and talks with Johnny, a mutual friend who is younger than both of them.

One day while Theresa is working, a sick elderly man, Ed, comes into the shop to pick up the same poison-laced cannabis Theresa administered to her mother. Theresa gives him the cannabis and he leaves; aware that he is using it to commit suicide, Theresa experiences an emotional breakdown. Ed returns later in the evening, informing Theresa and Keith that the drug failed to work. In the middle of the night, Theresa receives a phone call from Keith. She meets him at a carwash, where he tells her that Johnny has died, and accuses her of accidentally selling Johnny the poison-laced cannabis intended for Ed.

Her grief now compounded by guilt, Theresa's emotional state becomes increasingly fragile, and she begins retreating to the surrounding woods for hours at a time, causing strain on her relationship with Nick. Contemplating suicide, she prepares five individual joints laced with the poison, but at first cannot bring herself to smoke them. Later that night, she goes into the woods and works up the nerve to smoke one of the joints, but it does not kill her; she awakens the next morning with scratches on her legs. She smokes a second joint in the morning and has visions of herself walking through the wilderness. Later, she smokes the third joint, which induces powerful hallucinations, but does not kill her. When she returns to consciousness, she finds that she has assembled a wooden fence outside the house, but has no recollection of doing so.

Later that night, Theresa meets with Keith at a local bar and smokes a fourth joint. After, she drives to Ed's house and confesses to him how she inadvertently killed Johnny. After telling him the news, Ed dies in front of her. Upon returning home, she gets into a fight with Nick when she refuses to tell him where she has been. She eventually leaves and walks to Keith's house, visibly ill and vomiting. Keith, who perceives Theresa's guilt over the deaths of her mother and Johnny, suggests she confide in Nick. Theresa refutes the idea, and Keith threatens to call Nick on the phone. Theresa begins burning her fingertips on a hot clothes iron that Keith has left on. When he attempts to stop her, she attacks him, burning his face with the iron, and then beats him over the head with it numerous times, killing him.

Covered in blood, Theresa wanders into the woods and smokes the last of the poison-laced joints. This induces numerous visions of the landscape, during which Theresa begins levitating, and ascends into the tree canopy.

== Cast ==
- Kirsten Dunst as Theresa
- Pilou Asbæk as Keith
- Joe Cole as Nick
- Jack Kilmer as Johnny
- Susan Traylor as Theresa's mother
- Steph DuVall as Ed

== Themes ==
Woodshock explores themes of grief experienced at "extreme loss," which the filmmakers sought to anchor in "emotion and feeling," according to Laura Mulleavy. "It requires that the audience look inward and question what they do and why they do it. As things get faster and faster with technology, and we become more and more disconnected from our natural world, it's important to remind ourselves that these trees have been here for thousands of years. They’re a lot older and wiser than we are and they're still standing. Unless we completely destroy them. If you think about it, it’s so strange that we can disconnect so much from something that sustains us."

Hilton Als likened the film to "Alice in Wonderland in reverse": "Theresa is so small in the beginning and so overcome by this landscape and she's so powerful and large at the end standing on that stump and levitating. The male characters do kind of remind you of the Mad Hatter or the Caterpillar. These people are posing the questions to her. But she follows her own journey and makes her own decisions." Some critics have characterized the film as a drama as well as a horror film, though Kate Mulleavy stated that she never felt it was a horror film, but did cite the genre as an "influence."

== Production ==
=== Concept ===
Sisters Kate and Laura Mulleavy, founders of the fashion label Rodarte, began writing the script for Woodshock collaboratively in 2011. They had initially sought to "tell a story about the redwood forest. "From that landscape we developed the character of Theresa," Laura added, who she likened to "a creation myth: a woman who was birthed out of the landscape and beauty and destruction." "From the script writing process we were also very descriptive," said Kate. "We took description further, we described light for instance."

In 2013, the Mulleavys began the process of seeking out a production crew. The film was produced with Ken Kao, Ben LeClair and Michael Costigan under their Waypoint Entertainment and Cota Films banner respectively. Kirsten Dunst served as the film's chief executive producer.

=== Casting ===
The Mulleaveys sought Kirsten Dunst for the lead role of Theresa, and modeled the script with Dunst in mind. Dunst was a personal friend of the Mulleavys, having known them since her early twenties; she said in retrospect that their friendship afforded her an "emotional safety net" while filming. Dunst prepared for the role over the course of a year, undertaking dream experiments in order to try to inhabit the character's state of mind. Commenting on her preparation, Dunst said she felt the dream experiments allowed her to tap into her unconscious, so "by the time [I got] to set, I knew the character better than anybody else."

Joe Cole was cast in the role of Nick, Theresa's boyfriend, because the Mulleavys felt he had "a presence that could be so aggressive, yet so soft." Danish actor Pilou Asbæk was cast as Keith, a character Laura Mulleavy described as "complicated. He's seductive and yet he has no boundaries, he has no rules. He's not defined by logic or morality. Theresa is so burdened by her choices and Keith provides a great foil."

=== Filming ===
Filming began on June 29, 2015 in Eureka, California and surrounding Humboldt County. Dunst described the shooting process as "very quiet, but very emotional."

For the sequence in which Theresa levitates in the forest, Dunst was physically lifted in a harness 100 feet (30 m) above the ground toward the tree canopy. "Nobody gets to see these trees in the way I got to see them," she recalled, calling it one of the "most incredible" experiences she'd ever had. The film was exclusively shot on camera, aside from one sequence in which Theresa's home appears to float, which was completed in post-production.

== Release ==
A24 secured U.S. distribution rights for the film after it screened at the Cannes film market in 2015. The film had its world premiere at 74th Venice International Film Festival in the Cinema in the Garden section September 4, 2017. It received a limited release in the United States on September 22, 2017. Woodshock was released on Blu-ray and DVD by Lionsgate Home Entertainment on November 28, 2017. Both the Blu-ray and DVD releases of the film contain the featurette "Making Woodshock: A Mental Landscape" as supplemental material.

== Reception ==
=== Box office ===
The film opened on a total of three screens in Los Angeles and New York City, grossing $15,908 over the following week. On September 29, 2017, the film expanded to 39 theaters across the United States, and earned approximately $23,811 between September 29 and October 5, averaging $611 per theater. For the week of October 6–13, the film screened at a total of 9 theaters, earning an additional $2,884 before concluding its theatrical run. Over its three-week theatrical release, the film grossed a total of $43,682. On November 23, 2017, it received a theatrical release in Portugal, where it earned USD$689 in its opening weekend.

=== Critical response ===
As of 2025, on review aggregator website Rotten Tomatoes, the film has an approval rating of 27% based on 55 reviews, with an average rating of 4.3/10. The site's critics' consensus reads: "Woodshock's [sic] engages visually, but its half-baked premise is as underwhelming as it is unsatisfying." On Metacritic, which assigns a normalized rating to reviews, the film has a weighted average score of 39 out of 100 based 24 critics, indicating "generally unfavorable reviews".

Alan Zilberman of The Washington Post praised the film's musical score as well as Asbæk's performance, adding: "It would be easy to write off Woodshock as pretentious— weirdness for the sake of weirdness. But there’s something universal about Theresa, vs., say, the stoned high jinks of Cheech and Chong. Introspective and withdrawn, she uses marijuana as both catalyst and salve. Even as the film warns against persistent, clouded judgment, it is no criticism of casual drug use. Sustained, chemically induced bliss can be a blessing, Woodshock suggests, even up to the point at which the fog is the only thing left to see." Nathalie Atkinson of The Globe and Mail awarded the film two-and-a-half out of four stars, deeming the film a "sensuous, visual tone poem of human consciousness," but noted that "The disappointment is when a baffling and unnecessary third-act coup de théâtre abruptly crashes a comedown from the elaborate high." Writing for The Village Voice, Alan Scherstuhl noted: "Woodshock is a study of a mind’s stoned studying, of its slipping in and out of a haze, rather than one of a mind’s unraveling or snapping. It’s just as interesting as that sounds — you’ll either embrace it or find it agony."

David Fear of Rolling Stone compared the film to Repulsion (1965), adding: "Woodshock is both gorgeous and pretentious in equal measures, and it's hard to reconcile the fact that you don't get one without the other." In The New Yorker, Anthony Lane referred to the film as "hazy and half-dreamed," noting that "Hints of hallucination, compounded by shifting tricks of the light, mean that the real and the imagined are constantly sifted together; does Theresa, for example, spend quite as much time wandering past towering trees in her underwear as she appears to do? And do we care either way?" Sheri Linden of the Los Angeles Times called the film "pseudo-Bergmanesque" and a "death trip in pretty lingerie," summarily stating: "Sibling directors Kate and Laura Mulleavy’s Rodarte brand made them overnight couture stars; with their filmmaking debut, lightning has not struck twice." The New York Times's Jeanette Catsoulis noted that the film is "pretty enough, in the superficially embellished style of a perfume ad or fashion video," but deemed it "depressingly dull and terminally inarticulate...a painterly bore."

The Boston Globe's Ty Burr noted that the film "plays like a bad head-trip movie from the late 1960s...dreadful, [but] not quite bad enough to be much fun." Clint Davis of WKBW-TV called the film "depressing" and "dominated by sickness—both mental and physical," but praised Dunst's performance. Slant Magazine's Henry Stewart awarded the film one out of four stars, calling it "the obnoxious equivalent of trying to have a serious conversation with people who are high out of their minds." Kieran Grant, writing for the Toronto International Film Festival, praised the film's visuals, and noted its placement within a historical tradition of psychedelic-influenced films: "Horror and suspense cinema were pushing hallucinatory imagery from the get-go...What’s different about Woodshock and some of its forebears—whether arty or goofy or both—is that the film’s story world itself isn’t a portal to altered consciousness. Rather, characters’ ingestion of narcotics or psychedelics trigger the film’s—and the viewer’s—journey to the centre of the mind."
