= The Two Faces of January (film) =

2014 film by Hossein Amini

- Theatrical release poster
- Directed by: Hossein Amini
- Written by: Hossein Amini
- Based on: The Two Faces of January by Patricia Highsmith
- Produced by: Tom Sternberg; Tim Bevan; Eric Fellner; Robyn Slovo
- Starring: Viggo Mortensen; Kirsten Dunst; Oscar Isaac
- Cinematography: Marcel Zyskind
- Edited by: Nicolas Chaudeurge; Jon Harris
- Music by: Alberto Iglesias
- Production companies: StudioCanal; Working Title Films
- Distributed by: Magnolia Pictures (United States); StudioCanal (United Kingdom, France, Germany, Australia and New Zealand)
- Release dates: February 11, 2014 (Berlin); April 16, 2014 (United Kingdom); August 28, 2014 (United States)
- Running time: 97 minutes
- Countries: United Kingdom; United States; France
- Languages: English; Greek; Turkish
- Box office: $4.5 million

The Two Faces of January is a 2014 thriller film written and directed by Hossein Amini, in his feature film directorial debut. It is based on Patricia Highsmith's 1964 novel The Two Faces of January and stars Viggo Mortensen, Kirsten Dunst and Oscar Isaac.

Filming took place on location in Greece and Turkey, and at Ealing Studios in London. It premiered in February 2014 in the Berlinale Special Galas section of the 64th Berlin International Film Festival.

== Plot ==
In 1962, New York con man Chester MacFarland and his wife Colette are touring Greece. At the Acropolis, they meet Rydal Keener, an American who is alienated from his family. The MacFarlands invite him to dinner.

Rydal goes back to their hotel to return a bracelet that Colette left in their shared taxi. Meanwhile, a private detective hired by victims of Chester's investment swindles visits the MacFarlands' hotel room and demands that Chester repay their money. The detective pulls a gun, but Chester accidentally kills him after a struggle in which the detective falls and hits his head. As Chester is carrying the body to the detective's hotel room, Rydal finds him in the corridor. They hastily pack their suitcases and flee the hotel with Rydal but without checking out, leaving their passports at the front desk.

Rydal arranges for false passports to replace those left behind and suggests waiting for the counterfeit documents in Crete. While there, the mutual attraction between Rydal and Colette continues to develop, much to Chester's frustration. Colette believes someone has recognized her from newspaper pictures; she runs off the bus at a stop. Chester and Rydal follow and together they walk to the ruins of Knossos. Chester lures Rydal into an underground labyrinth and knocks him out. Colette, believing that he has killed Rydal, refuses to go any further with Chester. As they argue, she loses her balance and falls to her death down a flight of stairs.

Rydal comes to and discovers Colette's dead body. Upon leaving the site, he unexpectedly encounters a teacher with a group of students, who curiously watch him depart. He follows Chester to Athens, where the two realize that they are bound together by two deaths. If either man is arrested, he will implicate the other. Arriving in Athens, they head to the airport, where Chester boards a plane to Istanbul, leaving Rydal with a suitcase containing documents that tie him to Colette.

Rydal locates Chester in Istanbul and telephones him, demanding a meeting in the Grand Bazaar and threatening to go to the police unless Chester pays him off. Unbeknownst to Chester, Rydal has already been arrested by an FBI agent who demands that Rydal wear a wire and extract a confession from Chester. Sensing a trap, Chester flees and a chase ensues. A policeman shoots Chester who, as he lies dying, confesses his responsibility for both deaths. After Rydal is exonerated and released, he attends Chester's funeral and buries Colette's bracelet at his grave.

== Cast ==
- Viggo Mortensen as Chester MacFarland
- Kirsten Dunst as Colette MacFarland
- Oscar Isaac as Rydal Keener
- Daisy Bevan as Lauren
- David Warshofsky as Paul Vittorio
- Omiros Poulakis as Niko

== Production ==
Hossein Amini wrote the screenplay, which also marks his directorial debut; Amini said he had wanted to direct a film adaptation of the novel for the past 15 years. Producer Tom Sternberg optioned the rights to the novel and originally set up a project with the production company Mirage. Sternberg developed the project with Amini and it found the backing by StudioCanal and Working Title.

Principal photography began August 2012 in Athens, Crete, Istanbul, and London's Ealing Studios. Identifiable locations include the Küçük Hasan mosque on Chania harbour, a nearby café and the Grand Arsenal in Plateia Katehaki, the ruins of Knossos near Iraklion, and the Grand Bazaar in Istanbul.

== Release ==
StudioCanal distributed the film in the United Kingdom, Germany, France, Australia, and New Zealand, and Universal Pictures distributed it in Spain and Scandinavia; the former sold distribution rights for other territories. Entertainment One acquired rights for Canada. Magnolia Pictures picked up distribution rights for the United States and released the film via VOD on August 28, 2014, to be followed by a theatrical release on October 3, 2014.

== Reception ==
The Two Faces of January received mostly positive reviews; it holds an 80% rating based on 127 reviews on review aggregator website Rotten Tomatoes, with an average score of 6.75/10. The consensus states: "With striking visuals, complex characters, and Hitchcockian plot twists, The Two Faces of January offers a pleasantly pungent treat for fans of romantic thrillers." On Metacritic, the film has a 66/100 rating from 30 critics, indicating "generally favorable reviews". Peter DeBruge of Variety wrote that Amini "expertly blends touches of Hitchcock and Highsmith". In comparing it to The Talented Mr. Ripley, Deborah Young of The Hollywood Reporter said that it lacks the "joie de vivre" of that film, but has lush cinematography and shows Amini's "skill at working with actors". Manohla Dargis of The New York Times wrote, "Mr. Amini adds embellishing details and plot layers, hints at a grave Oedipal disturbance, turns up the sexual heat and smoothly increases the narrative torque." Betsy Sharkey of the Los Angeles Times wrote, "As was the case in the book, there are moves that don't always make sense, but the game-playing is riveting."

== See also ==
- 2014 in film
- List of American films of 2014
- List of British films of 2014
- List of French films of 2014
