= We All Go Back to Where We Belong =

2011 single by R.E.M.

Single by R.E.M.

from the album Part Lies, Part Heart, Part Truth, Part Garbage 1982–2011
- Released: October 17, 2011
- Recorded: July 2011
- Studio: John Keane Studios, Athens, Georgia, United States
- Genre: Alternative rock; folk rock
- Length: 3:36
- Label: Warner Bros.
- Songwriters: Peter Buck; Mike Mills; Michael Stipe
- Producers: Jacknife Lee; R.E.M.

R.E.M. singles chronology
"Discoverer" (2011)	"We All Go Back to Where We Belong" (2011)

"We All Go Back to Where We Belong" is the final single from American alternative rock band R.E.M., released in 2011. The song is the lead single from the band's final album, the career-spanning greatest hits compilation Part Lies, Part Heart, Part Truth, Part Garbage 1982–2011. The song was made available over the Internet on October 17, 2011.

== Recording ==
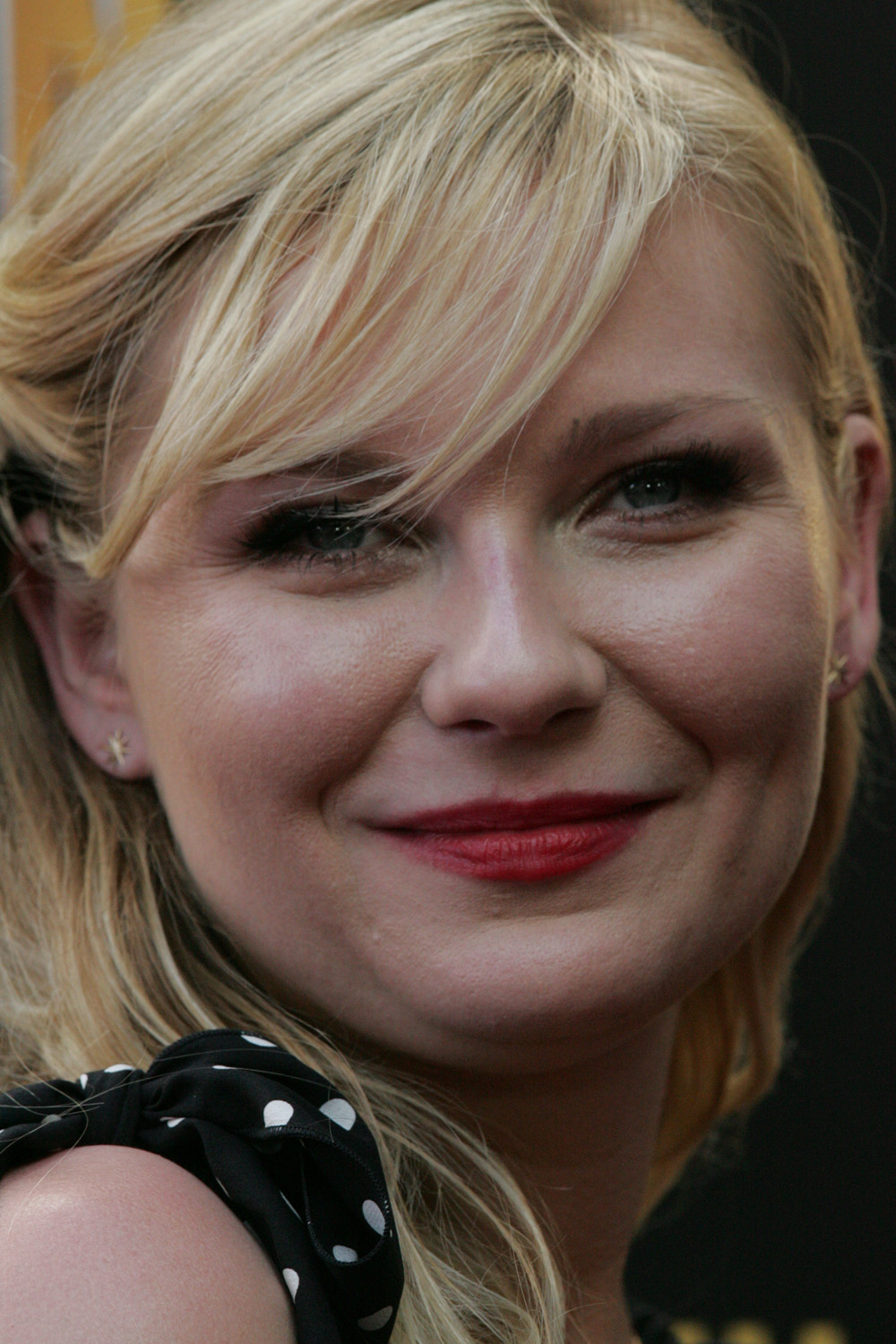

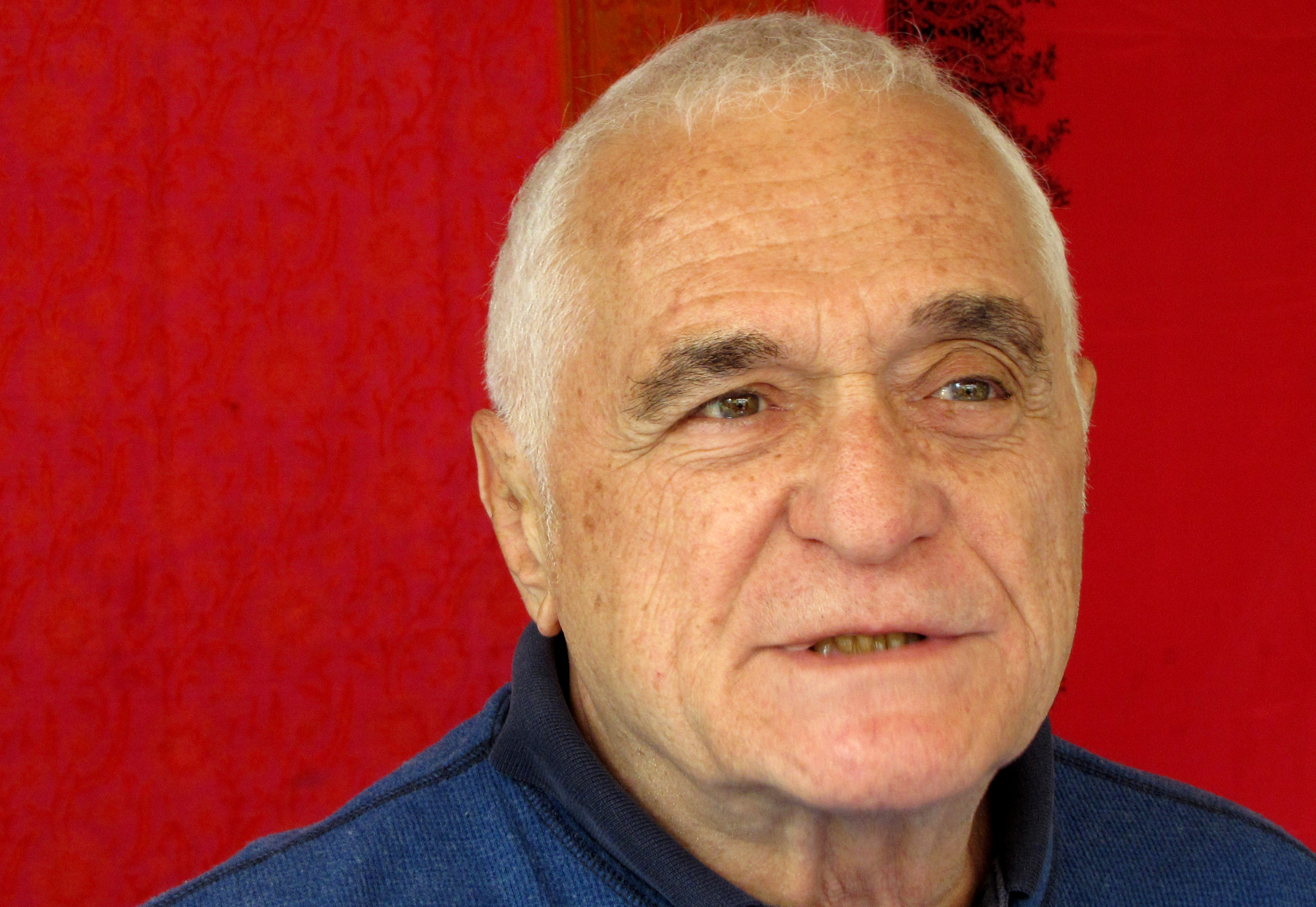
Two music videos were shot for the song, focusing on the faces of Kirsten Dunst and John Giorno

The song was originally written by bassist Mike Mills and was recorded by the band in Athens, Georgia in July 2011, after the sessions for its final studio release, Collapse into Now. The band finished this song as well as the demos "A Month of Saturdays" and "Hallelujah" with producer Jacknife Lee initially with the intention of creating an album independently, after having fulfilled its contractual obligations to Warner Bros. Records, but decided to disband instead.

Two music videos with direction by Dominic J. DeJoseph and Michael Stipe—one starring Kirsten Dunst and the other with John Giorno. Stipe conceived of the concept for the videos spontaneously while recording his vocal track and asked DeJoseph to make the videos in the style of Andy Warhol's Screen Tests. Stipe personally asked Dunst—his neighbor in New York City—to star in the video and did three takes with Dunst; the one that was chosen had him singing the song to her off-camera.

== Reception ==
=== Critical reception ===
Early reviews of the song considered it a "low-key, string-drenched ballad" (Stereogum) and compared it to the pop styling of Burt Bacharach and R.E.M.'s 2001 album Reveal. Jon Dolan of Rolling Stone gave the song 3.5 out of five stars, writing that the "orchestral folk rock... suits their breakup perfectly." Exclaim!'s Alex Hudson had a similar sentiment, declaring the single "a nice kiss-off with lyrics that read a bit like a pensive goodbye message." Claire Suddath of Time also considers it a fitting final single, comparing it with the wistfulness of "Man on the Moon" and The Boston Herald's Jed Gottlieb has compared it favorably to R.E.M. ballads "Nightswimming" and "Perfect Circle".

== Chart performance ==
Chart (2011)	Peak position
Belgium (Ultratip Bubbling Under Flanders)	35
Belgium (Ultratip Bubbling Under Wallonia)	29
Japan (Japan Hot 100) (Billboard)	59
Netherlands (Dutch Top 40 Tipparade)	19
US Adult Alternative Airplay (Billboard)	13
Venezuela Pop Rock General (Record Report)	8

== Personnel ==
R.E.M.

- Peter Buck – guitar, writing, and production
- Mike Mills – bass guitar, background vocals, writing, and production
- Michael Stipe – vocals, writing, and production

Technical personnel

- Chris Bilheimer – art design
- Jacknife Lee – production
