= Rodarte =

American fashion company

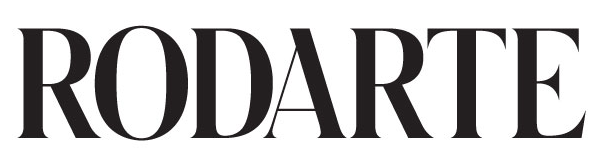
- Type: Private
- Industry: Fashion
- Founded: 2005; 21 years ago
- Founder: Kate Mulleavy; Laura Mulleavy
- Headquarters: Los Angeles, California, United States
- Website: www.rodarte.net

Rodarte (/ˈroʊdɑːrteɪ/) is an American brand of clothing and accessories founded and headquartered in Los Angeles, California, USA, by sisters Kate and Laura Mulleavy.

Rodarte has received a number of fashion industry awards since the line's inception in 2005. In addition to their main fashion line, the sisters have also collaborated with Gap and Target on limited edition pieces.

== History ==
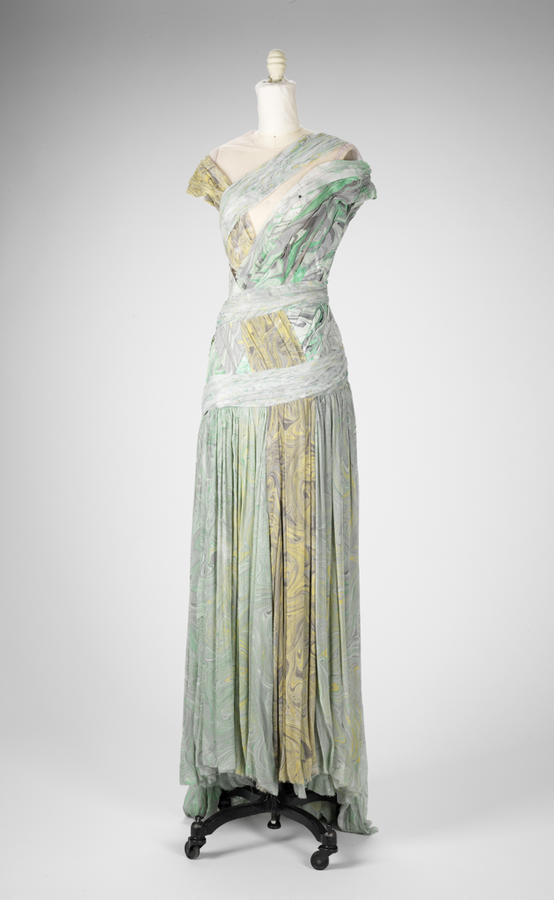
Fall-Winter 2009 Rodarte dress. Printed silk crêpe embroidered with Swarovski crystals (RISD Museum).

In 2002 after leaving college, the Mulleavy sisters returned home to Aptos, California, where they spent the intervening years saving up US$16,500 in order to create a capsule collection, with Laura working as a waitress and Kate selling off a collection of rare records. The label Rodarte is the original Spanish pronunciation and spelling of their mother's maiden name, Rodart.

After their initial collection of just ten pieces (which included seven dresses and two coats), the Mulleavys traveled to New York City and appeared on the cover of a February 2005 issue of Women's Wear Daily. This led to their meeting with Vogue editor-in-chief Anna Wintour, who personally flew to Los Angeles to meet the sisters.

The Mulleavy sisters garnered notoriety early on for their meticulous approach to clothing, with one chiffon dress from their 2006 collection taking over 150 hours to complete. In the spring of 2007, the label released a line of limited-edition exclusive shirts in collaboration with Gap. In December 2009, the label released another separate line of limited-edition pieces in collaboration with Target.

In the fall of 2010, the label decided to collaborate with MAC Cosmetics to release a limited edition line of makeup based on the Fall 2010 collection. The line received heavy criticism due to the inspiration from the city of Ciudad Juárez, which is known for women’s sexual assault cases. Because of this, MAC and Rodarte released an apology, and donated $100,000 to "a nonprofit organization that has a proven, successful track record helping women in need and that can directly improve the lives of women in Juarez in a meaningful way.".

== Style and influences ==
They both credit their West Coast upbringing as a major source of inspiration for their collections. The natural American landscape is of particular inspiration to the sisters. Rodarte's aesthetic influences have evolved since the label's establishment, with their evolution described in 2010 as "darker, their clothing riskier, more deconstructed, punk, and gothic. Each collection has been stranger than the last, influenced by anime and horror films, and elements of S & M culture." In an article published by The New Yorker, the label was described as "the fashion equivalent of a Basquiat. People in the know really love it, but to everyone else it’s inscrutable or a little bit ugly."

== Museums and exhibitions ==
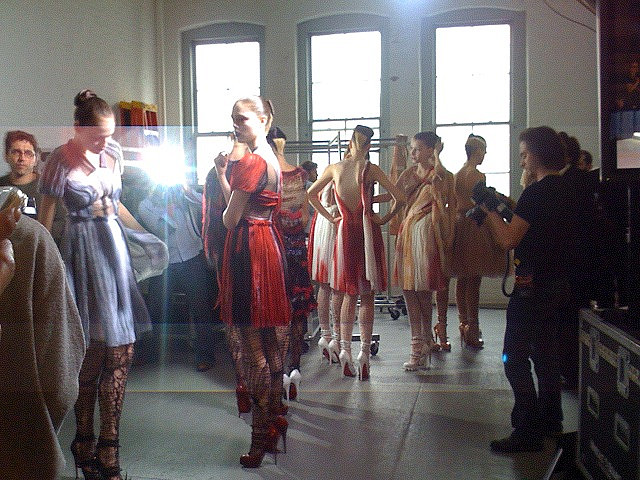
Backstage at Fall 2008 Rodarte fashion show

Rodarte is in the permanent collections of the Costume Institute of the Metropolitan Museum of Art, the Fashion Institute of Technology Museum in New York, the Los Angeles County Museum of Art, and the Museum of Fine Arts, Boston. Rodarte was featured in the fall 2007 exhibit BLOGMODE at the Metropolitan Museum of Art's Costume Institute, as well as several exhibits at The Museum at FIT including Luxury in spring 2007, Gothic: Dark Glamour in fall 2008, and American Beauty: Aesthetics & Innovation in Fashion in spring 2010. Arnhem Fashion Biennale featured Rodarte vignettes in July 2007, 2009 and 2011. In 2013, the Boston Museum of Fine Art featured their Blue and White Embroidered Spring 2011 Dress and Printed shoes. For the 2013 Punk: Chaos to Couture Metropolitan Museum of Art Costume Institute show, 4 looks of Rodarte's Spring 2009 and Fall 2008 Collections were on display.

In 2008, Rodarte was featured in Artforum, making the Mulleavy sisters the first fashion designers to be featured in the magazine since Issey Miyake in 1982. In February 2010, Rodarte had their first solo-exhibition, at the Cooper-Hewitt Museum (the design branch of the Smithsonian Institution).

In May 2011, Rodarte contributed artworks to the Los Angeles County Museum of Arts Cell Phone Stories project. Their contribution included sketches based on artworks held in the LACMA's permanent collection.

In February 2011, the Museum of Contemporary Art, Los Angeles opened Rodarte: States of Matter, the first West Coast museum exhibition of the Rodarte's fashion and costume designs from Fall 2008, Spring 2010, Fall 2010, and pieces from the film Black Swan.

In 2011, the Los Angeles County Museum of Art (LACMA) acquired the Rodarte Spring 2012 couture collection. LACMA displayed the renaissance-inspired clothing in their Italian renaissance gallery, alongside Italian renaissance artworks, in the exhibition Rodarte: Fra Angelico Collection from December 2011 to February 2012.

From November 10, 2018, to February 10, 2019, the National Museum of Women in the Arts exhibited Rodarte. “The exhibition explores the distinctive design principles, material concerns, and recurring themes that position the Mulleavys’ work within the landscape of contemporary art and fashion.”

== Accolades ==
Kate and Laura Mulleavy were one of the 50 recipients to win the 2009 United States Artists Fellowship.

Rodarte was Cooper Hewitt's National Design Awards Fashion Design Finalist in 2009 and winner in 2010.

Rodarte is the first fashion house to be awarded the National Art Award from Americans for the Arts in 2010. The award is a custom Jeff Koons gold bunny sculpture.

Rodarte is awarded the Star Honoree Award from Fashion Group International in 2011.

Rodarte was named one of Fast Company’s 50 Designers Shaping The Future in October 2012.

In May 2014, Rodarte's short film directed by Todd Cole is awarded the People's Choice Webby Award for Branded Scripted Entertainment.

- 2014 Webby Award People's Choice- Branded Scripted Entertainment- Won
- 2011 Fashion Group International's Star Honoree Award- Won
- 2010 National Art Award from Americans for the Arts- Won
- 2010 Cooper Hewitt National Design Awards- Won
- 2009 United States Artists Fellowships Recipient
- 2009 CFDA Womenswear Designer of the Year - Won
- 2008 CFDA Swarovski Award for Womenswear - Won
- 2008 Stella Swiss Textiles Award - Won
- 2006 Ecco Domani Fashion Foundation Award - Won

== See also ==
- Dice Kayek
