= Jeffrey Manchester =

American criminal (born 1971)

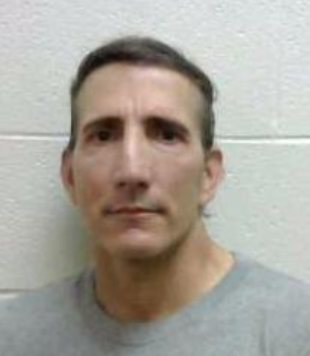
- North Carolina mugshot of Manchester
- Born: Jeffrey Allen Manchester; November 12, 1971 (age 55); Sacramento, California, U.S.
- Years active: 1997–2000; 2004–2005
- Criminal charges: Robbery with a dangerous weapon, malicious use of explosives to damage property, burning an unoccupied building, breaking and entering, possession of a firearm by a felon
- Criminal penalty: 2000: Sentenced to 45 years in prison (escaped after serving 4 years); 2005: Sentenced to upwards of 40 years in prison
- Spouse: 1 (m. 1991/92, div. 1999)
- Children: 3

Jeffrey Allen Manchester (born November 12, 1971) is an American criminal known for his modus operandi activity of breaking and entering into McDonald's locations by drilling through their roofs, earning him the alias The Roofman. Before being apprehended for a second time in 2005 in Charlotte, North Carolina, Manchester used the alias John Zorn from July 2004 to February 2005.

== Early life ==
Jeffrey Allen Manchester attended high school in Rancho Cordova, California, before enlisting in the U.S. Army. He served in the 82nd Airborne Division, where he learned rappelling, weapons handling, and other skills he would use during his robberies. He married in 1991 at age 20, but divorced in 1999, while serving at Concord Naval Weapons Station. Prior to his robbery spree, Manchester was employed at McDonald's.

== Crime spree ==
Manchester began robbing chiefly McDonald's locations across the United States in November 1998. His modus operandi consisted of meticulous planning and observation before drilling, hacking, or sawing through the roof of the target building during the night or early morning hours, and waiting, often in a restroom, for the morning when he would emerge with a firearm and hold up employees before ushering them into the walk-in refrigerator, locking them inside while he robbed the cash registers.

Throughout his robberies, Manchester maintained a very gentle and cordial demeanor, rarely resorting to violence throughout his estimated 40–60 robberies across the country, with some victims stating he had suggested donning a coat before entering the freezer. His crimes and actions earned him the alias "The Roofman".

== Escape from prison ==
While incarcerated at Brown Creek, Manchester worked in the prison's metal shop; he used this work assignment to devise an escape plan over the four years he would be in the facility. After observing trucks coming in and out of the prison, Manchester crafted a plywood platform, which he spray-painted black, along with some cardboard. On June 15, 2004, he hid in an outgoing truck's undercarriage, using the plywood platform and cardboard to conceal his body should gate guards inspect the truck. Following his escape, Manchester hitchhiked to Charlotte.

== Toys "R" Us robbery and recapture ==
Upon reaching Charlotte, Manchester lived in a Charlotte Toys "R" Us store, staying in backrooms and other areas inside, surviving on candy and baby food off the shelves, and exercising during the night when the store was closed by riding a bike throughout the store aisles. During the holiday rush of December 2004, Manchester moved his living quarters to an abandoned Circuit City next door to avoid detection, creating a room under a stairwell where he painted the walls, put up posters, and passed the time by watching movies during the day.

During his time in Charlotte, Manchester became a member of the community, biding his time until the robbery, even dating a local woman, Leigh Moore (Leigh Wainscott), and joining the Crossroads Presbyterian Church. He spent a large amount of his time with Moore and her children, bringing them toys he had pilfered from the store where he lived, and covering his seeming unemployment and homelessness with secretive whispers about a highly confidential government job, claiming his quarters were in a restricted office building.

Before committing the Toys "R" Us robbery, Manchester burned down a Charlotte dentist's office where he had gotten work on his teeth done during his time there. He reportedly robbed a pawn shop to acquire a gun in preparation for the robbery. On the morning of December 26, Manchester robbed the Toys "R" Us, taking an unknown amount of cash before being forced to flee after two employees were able to slip out of the store to notify law enforcement, leading to police locating Manchester's secret lodgings in Circuit City, and subsequently discovering his only fingerprint, ironically found on a DVD of Catch Me If You Can.

Despite having committed the robbery, Manchester did not leave Charlotte. After informing Moore of the true identity of Manchester, whom she believed to be named "John Zorn", the police convinced Moore to call Manchester to her home on January 5, 2005, and recaptured him upon arrival.

Following his January recapture, a December trial found Manchester guilty of numerous charges relating to his Charlotte crimes. He was sentenced to forty years in prison. He is currently serving his sentence at Central Prison in Raleigh, North Carolina, after originally serving at Marion Correctional Institute in McDowell County, North Carolina. Manchester unsuccessfully attempted more prison escapes in 2009 and 2017. His current expected release date is December 4, 2036.

== Legacy ==
Manchester is portrayed by Channing Tatum in the 2025 film Roofman, which is based on his life and primarily chronicles his time in hiding at Toys "R" Us.
