= On Becoming a God in Central Florida =

2019 American dark comedy television series

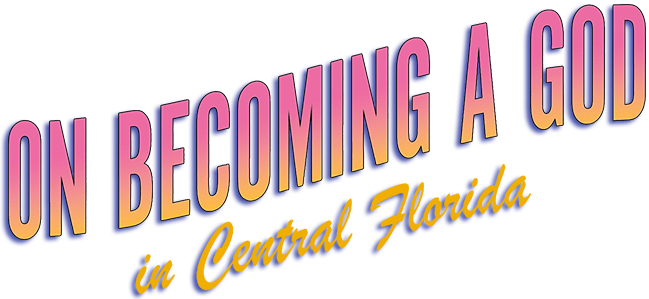
- Genre: Dark comedy; Comedy drama; Satire
- Created by: Robert Funke; Matt Lutsky
- Starring: Kirsten Dunst; Théodore Pellerin; Mel Rodriguez; Beth Ditto; Ted Levine
- Composers: Danny Bensi; Saunder Jurriaans
- Country of origin: United States
- No. of seasons: 1
- No. of episodes: 10

Production
- Executive producers: Esta Spalding; Robert Funke; Matt Lutsky; Grant Heslov; George Clooney; Sarah Shepard; Kirsten Dunst; Charlie McDowell
- Producers: Jean Higgins; Sarah Shepard
- Cinematography: Tobias Datum
- Camera setup: Single-camera
- Running time: 42–48 minutes
- Production companies: Smokehouse Pictures; Pali Eyes Pictures; TriStar Television; Showtime Networks

Original release
- Network: Showtime
- Release: August 25 – October 20, 2019

On Becoming a God in Central Florida is an American dark comedy television series created by Robert Funke and Matt Lutsky that premiered on Showtime on August 25, 2019. The series stars Kirsten Dunst and is set in the early 1990s.

In September 2019, the series was renewed for a second season. However, in October 2020, the renewal decision was reversed and the series was canceled after only one season and ten episodes due to the COVID-19 pandemic.

== Plot ==
Krystal Stubbs is a minimum-wage-earning water park employee in Greater Orlando who schemes her way up the ranks of Founders American Merchandise, a cultish, flag-waving, multi-billion-dollar multi-level marketing pyramid scheme that drove her family to ruin.

== Cast and characters ==
=== Main ===
- Kirsten Dunst as Krystal Stubbs
- Théodore Pellerin as Cody Bonar
- Mel Rodriguez as Ernie Gomes
- Beth Ditto as Bets Gomes
- Ted Levine as Obie Garbeau II

=== Recurring ===
- Usman Ally as Stan Van Grundegaard
- Eric Allan Kramer as Carroll Wilkes
- Julie Benz as Carole Wilkes
- Billy Slaughter as Kissinger Haight
- Josh Fadem as Pat Stanley
- Da'Vine Joy Randolph as Rhonda
- Cooper Jack Rubin as Harold Gomes
- John Earl Jelks as Dr. Judd Waltrip
- Melissa De Sousa as Mirta Herrera
- Kevin J. O'Connor as Roger Penland
- Sharon Lawrence as Louise Garbeau
- Shari Headley as Harmony
- Geoffrey Owens as Pastor Steve

=== Guest ===
- Alexander Skarsgård as Travis Stubbs
- Mary Steenburgen as Ellen Joy Bonar
- David Paymer as Buck Bridges

== Episodes ==
No.	Title	Directed by	Written by	Original release date	U.S. viewers (millions)
1	"The Stinker Thinker"	Charlie McDowell	Robert Funke & Matt Lutsky	August 16, 2019 (online); August 25, 2019 (Showtime)	0.173
Krystal Stubbs is a new mother whose husband, Travis, sells insurance but is primarily focused on leaving his job and selling Founders American Merchandise (FAM) full time. Under pressure from Travis's up-line, Krystal tries to pressure the bosses of the waterpark where she works to only stock FAM. When that fails she finally puts her foot down with Travis and insists that she will only support his ambitions if he fully commits to his insurance job. Travis nevertheless quits and dies shortly after in a freak accident involving an alligator. Travis' funeral is attended by the founder, who urges a skeptical Krystal to keep her husband's downline but refuses to provide her with any financial compensation.
2	"The Gloomy-Zoomies"	Jeremy Podeswa	Robert Funke	August 16, 2019 (online); August 25, 2019 (Showtime)	0.138
Krystal struggles with the reality of being a single mother and realizes that her situation is even worse than she thought as Travis had remortgaged the house and left them deeply in debt. Travis's up-line, Cody Bonar, struggles with how to keep Krystal and her downline part of his team as commission from Travis was a substantial part of his downline. After burning through some of her goodwill, Krystal accepts an offer from Cody for a one time advance in order to stay with FAM and recruit others.
3	"A Positive Spin!"	Rose Troche	Matt Lutsky	September 1, 2019	0.216
Krystal loses her home and is forced to stay at work while trying to scrape by. Delivering product to her downline she meets Mimi and discovers one more devastating secret Travis was hiding from her. Fed up Krystal smooth talks Cody into letting her speak to his downline under the guise of talking him up while secretly planning to tell the captive audience how selling FAM ruined her life.
4	"Manifest Destinee"	Rodman Flender	Pamela Davis	September 8, 2019	0.235
5	"Many Masters"	Daniel Scheinert	Mike Goldbach	September 15, 2019	0.216
6	"American Merchandise"	Julie Anne Robinson	Carlos Rios	September 22, 2019	0.185
7	"Flint Glass"	Matt Spicer	Esta Spalding	September 29, 2019	0.214
8	"Birthday Party"	So Yong Kim	Robert Funke & Matt Lutsky	October 6, 2019	0.161
9	"Wham Bam Thank You FAM"	Tricia Brock	Story by : Pamela Davis; Teleplay by : Jessica Blaire and Stephanie Riggs	October 13, 2019	0.132
10	"Go Getters Gonna Go Getcha"	Charlie McDowell	Robert Funke & Matt Lutsky & Esta Spalding	October 20, 2019	0.179

== Production ==
=== Development ===
On January 6, 2017, it was reported that AMC was developing the production. The series was created by Robert Funke and Matt Lutsky who also wrote the pilot episode and were set to executive produce for the series alongside Kirsten Dunst, Yorgos Lanthimos, George Clooney, and Grant Heslov. Lanthimos was also set to direct. Production companies involved with the series were expected to include Smokehouse Pictures, TriStar Television, and AMC Studios.

On June 25, 2018, it was announced that the production had moved to YouTube Premium, which had given it a series order for a first season consisting of 10 episodes. It was further reported that Esta Spalding and Charlie McDowell had joined the series as executive producers. Spaulding is also set to serve as showrunner and McDowell is set to direct, replacing Lanthimos as executive producer and director.

On June 17, 2019, it was announced that Showtime, which had acquired the series from TriStar, would air the series instead of YouTube and that it would premiere on August 25, 2019.

On September 26, 2019, Showtime renewed the series for a second season. However, on October 7, 2020, Showtime reversed the renewal and canceled the series, stating that "the [COVID-19 pandemic] has continued to challenge schedules across the board, and although we have made every effort to reunite the cast and crew for a second season, that has become untenable."

=== Casting ===
Alongside the initial development announcement, it was confirmed that Kirsten Dunst would star in the series. On August 28, 2018, it was announced that Théodore Pellerin had been cast in a lead role. On September 14, 2018, it was reported that Ted Levine, Mel Rodriguez, and Beth Ditto had joined the cast in series regular roles and that Usman Ally would appear on a recurring basis. On October 5, 2018, it was announced that Julie Benz had joined the cast in a recurring capacity. On November 28, 2018, it was reported that Melissa De Sousa would appear in a recurring role.

=== Filming ===
Principal photography for the series commenced in October 2018 in New Orleans, Louisiana. On October 8, 2018, filming took place in Westwego, Louisiana.

== Reception ==
=== Critical response ===
On review aggregator Rotten Tomatoes, the series holds an approval rating of 85% based on 47 reviews, with an average rating of 7.29/10. The website's critical consensus reads, "Though it loses a bit of narrative steam, On Becoming a God in Central Florida proves a clever and absurd satire that will make you want to buy whatever Kirsten Dunst is selling." On Metacritic, it has a weighted average score of 76 out of 100, based on 22 critics, indicating "generally favorable reviews".

=== Accolades ===
Year	Award	Category	Nominee(s)	Result	Ref.
2020	Critics' Choice Television Awards	Best Actress in a Comedy Series	Kirsten Dunst	Nominated	
2020	Golden Globe Awards	Best Actress – Television Series Musical or Comedy	Kirsten Dunst	Nominated	
2020	Writers Guild of America Awards	Episodic Comedy	Robert F. Funke and Matt Lutsky (for "The Stinker Thinker")	Nominated	
