= Roofman =

2025 film by Derek Cianfrance

- Theatrical release poster
- Directed by: Derek Cianfrance
- Screenplay by: Derek Cianfrance; Kirt Gunn
- Produced by: Jamie Patricof; Lynette Howell Taylor; Alex Orlovsky; Duncan Montgomery; Dylan Sellers
- Starring: Channing Tatum; Kirsten Dunst; Ben Mendelsohn; LaKeith Stanfield; Juno Temple; Uzo Aduba; Jimmy O. Yang; Peter Dinklage
- Cinematography: Andrij Parekh
- Edited by: Jim Helton; Ron Patane
- Music by: Christopher Bear
- Production companies: High Frequency Entertainment; Hunting Lane; 51 Entertainment; Limelight; Von Wadden Entertainment
- Distributed by: Paramount Pictures (Note: Co-distributed with Miramax.) (North America and United Kingdom); FilmNation Entertainment (International)
- Release dates: September 6, 2025 (TIFF); October 10, 2025 (United States)
- Running time: 126 minutes
- Country: United States
- Language: English
- Budget: $19 million
- Box office: $34.8 million

Roofman is a 2025 American crime comedy film directed by Derek Cianfrance, from a script he wrote with Kirt Gunn. It is based on the life of Jeffrey Manchester, played by Channing Tatum, who robbed McDonald's locations by drilling through their roofs and hid out in a toy store after escaping prison. The film also stars Kirsten Dunst, LaKeith Stanfield, Juno Temple, and Peter Dinklage, with Ben Mendelsohn, Uzo Aduba, and Jimmy O. Yang appearing in supporting roles.

Roofman had its world premiere at the Toronto International Film Festival on September 6, 2025, and was theatrically released in the United States by Paramount Pictures on October 10, 2025. It received positive reviews from critics and grossed $34 million worldwide.

== Plot ==
In 1998, Jeffrey Manchester is a divorced U.S. Army veteran living in North Carolina. Struggling to provide for his three young kids, he is reminded by Steve — his friend and fellow member of the 82nd Airborne Division — of his keen powers of observation. Jeffrey uses his knack for noticing and exploiting routines to rob a McDonald's, breaking in through the roof at night. Surprising the morning shift, Jeffrey orders the employees into the walk-in freezer but treats them kindly, even handing his own coat to the manager before escaping with the contents of the safe.

Over the next two years, Jeffrey uses the same strategy more than forty times. He grabs the attention of the cops and the media, earning the nickname the "Roofman." After trying to make a run for it, he is arrested at his daughter's birthday party and sentenced to forty-five years in prison, prompting his ex-wife, Talana, to cut off his contact with their children.

Using his ingenuity, Jeffrey escapes prison and calls Steve. Steve chews him out for reaching out and tells him to call back in a month. Jeffrey conceals himself inside a Toys "R" Us store, living on candy and keeping an eye on the employees.

Jeffrey decides to wait out the month in the store, but when he calls Steve, he learns Steve has taken a contract in Afghanistan and won't be back for six months. Jeffrey settles into the store, making a nice little setup for himself hidden behind the bike shelves. He takes a liking to an employee named Leigh after seeing her manager, Mitch, being harsh on her. Mitch also refuses to donate any toys for the toy drive Leigh is organizing at her church.

Jeffrey then steals the toys and drops them off in front of the church. A churchgoer encourages him to come inside, and after the service, Jeffrey gets roped into talking with the folks there, claiming to be John Zorn, a visiting New Yorker. The congregation tries to set him up with Leigh.

Leigh and Jeffrey hit it off, and after a few dates, he asks to meet her two daughters because he misses his own kids. He keeps visiting the three of them, even teaching the older girl how to drive, and the four start building a life together.

Six months later, Jeffrey visits Steve, who tells him he can get him a new passport and docs for $50,000. Desperate to start fresh, Jeffrey robs the Toys "R" Us store at gunpoint, taking everyone hostage and pistol-whipping an armed security guard. Leigh shows up during the robbery and recognizes him.

Jeffrey gets away and delivers the cash to Steve, who tells him to cut ties with everyone for good once he gets out of town. Jeffrey is on his way to the airport when Leigh calls, telling him she loves him and asking if he can come over for Christmas dinner that day. Tearful at the thought of leaving Leigh and the girls behind, he turns the car around.

Jeffrey is at Leigh's door when he gets ambushed by the police. An extra thirty-two years are tacked onto his sentence. Not planning to break out anymore, Jeffrey tries to make the best of life behind bars. Leigh visits and forgives him.

During the end credits, photographs of the real Jeffrey Manchester are shown alongside footage from local news reports in 2004 and interviews with the real Leigh and others who crossed paths with him. He has since tried to escape prison twice — in 2009 and 2017 — though he insists he has no more plans to escape. His current projected release date is December 4, 2036.

== Cast ==
- Channing Tatum as Jeffrey Manchester / "John Zorn", a former United States Army non-commissioned officer turned criminal
- Kirsten Dunst as Leigh Wainscott, a Toys "R" Us employee, single mother, and Jeffrey's love interest
- LaKeith Stanfield as Steve, Jeff's friend and former sergeant, now running a fake ID operation
- Juno Temple as Michelle, Steve's girlfriend
- Peter Dinklage as Mitch, manager of the Toys "R" Us store
- Ben Mendelsohn as Ron Smith, pastor of Leigh's church
- Uzo Aduba as Eileen Smith, Ron's wife
- Emory Cohen as Otis, a Toys "R" Us employee
- Melonie Diaz as Talana, Jeff's ex-wife
- Molly Price as Sergeant Katherine Scheimreif, a police officer leading the hunt for Jeffrey
- Lily Collias as Lindsay Wainscott, Leigh's elder daughter
- Kennedy Moyer as Dee Wainscott, Leigh's younger daughter
- Alissa Marie Pearson as Becky, Jeffrey's daughter
- Tony Revolori as Duane, manager of a McDonald's robbed by Jeffrey
- Kathryn Stamas as Kami, one of the churchgoers who initially meets Manchester
- Jimmy O. Yang as a used-car salesman
- Punkie Johnson as a police officer

Several people involved in the real-life story of Jeffrey Manchester have cameos in the film. Charles Cummings, who drove the truck used by Manchester to escape from prison, appears as the same truck driver; Katherine Scheimreif, Manchester's arresting officer, appears as a retired police officer at a church singles event; Leigh Moore, née Wainscott, appears as a crossing guard; Ron Smith, Wainscott's pastor, appears as a pawn shop employee; and Chris Kimbell, a SWAT officer, appears as one of the police officers who discover Manchester's hiding place.

== Production ==
The project was announced in February 2024 with Derek Cianfrance as director from a script he wrote with Kirt Gunn. The screenplay was based on an earlier script by David Stephens and Peter Petrucci. Dylan Sellers and Chris Parker produced through the Limelight production company alongside Jamie Patricof and Lynette Howell Taylor. Channing Tatum was to star. Ben Mendelsohn and Kirsten Dunst joined the cast in September 2024. In October 2024, Miramax acquired distribution rights to the project, with parent Paramount Pictures distributing on its behalf in the United States and United Kingdom with financing handled by Aperture Media Partners and FilmNation Entertainment handling international sales.Peter Dinklage, Uzo Aduba, Juno Temple, LaKeith Stanfield, Molly Price, Melonie Diaz, Lily Collias, Emory Cohen, and Tony Revolori joined the cast.

Principal photography began on October 24, 2024, in Gastonia, North Carolina. Filming wrapped on December 12, 2024. Cinematographer Andrij Parekh shot the film on 35mm, marking his second collaboration with Cianfrance. Some of the filming locations include Freedom Park, Mecklenburg County Jail North, and the Gaston County Courthouse. Jim Helton edited the film. Christopher Bear composed the score for the film.

== Release ==
Roofman had its world premiere at the Toronto International Film Festival on September 6, 2025. It was released in the United States on October 10, 2025, moved from its original release date of October 3, 2025.

== Reception ==
=== Box office ===
Roofman grossed $23 million in the United States and Canada and $11 million in other territories, for a total of $34 million worldwide.

In the United States and Canada, Roofman was projected to gross $8–12 million from 3,340 theaters in its opening weekend. The film made $3.2 million on its first day. It went on to debut to $8.1 million, finishing second behind fellow newcomer Tron: Ares. In its second weekend, the film dropped 54%, grossing $3.7 million, finishing fifth.

=== Critical response ===
On the review aggregator website Rotten Tomatoes, 87% of 218 critics' reviews are positive, with an average rating of 7.1/10. The website's consensus reads: "A disarmingly sweet tonal gearshift for director Derek Cianfrance, Roofman is shaggy as a narrative but expertly tailored to Channing Tatum's strengths as an eminently likable leading man." Metacritic, which uses a weighted average, assigned the film a score of 66 out of 100, based on 37 critics, indicating "generally favorable" reviews. Audiences polled by CinemaScore gave the film an average grade of "B+" on an A+ to F scale.

=== Accolades ===
Award	Date of ceremony	Category	Recipient(s)	Result	Ref.
Film Independent Spirit Awards	February 15, 2026	Best Supporting Performance	Kirsten Dunst	Nominated	
Set Decorators Society of America Awards	February 21, 2026	Best Achievement in Décor/Design of a Contemporary Feature Film	Kendall Anderson (Set Decoration); Inbal Weinberg (Production Design)	Nominated	

== See also ==
- Secret Mall Apartment
