= Rhinoceros (Fargo) =

- Fargo episode
- Episode no.: Season 2 Episode 6
- Directed by: Jeffrey Reiner
- Written by: Noah Hawley
- Cinematography by: Dana Gonzales
- Editing by: Bridget Durnford; Regis Kimble
- Production code: XFO02006
- Original air date: November 16, 2015
- Running time: 46 minutes

Guest appearances
- Cristin Milioti as Betsy Solverson; Jeffrey Donovan as Dodd Gerhardt; Bokeem Woodbine as Mike Milligan; Nick Offerman as Karl Weathers; Michael Hogan as Otto Gerhardt; Rachel Keller as Simone Gerhardt; Zahn McClarnon as Hanzee Dent; Angus Sampson as Bear Gerhardt

Episode chronology
| ← Previous "The Gift of the Magi" | Next → "Did You Do This? No, You Did It!" |
- Fargo (season 2)

"Rhinoceros" is the sixth episode of the second season of the American anthology black comedy–crime drama television series Fargo. It is the 16th overall episode of the series and was written by series creator Noah Hawley and directed by Jeffrey Reiner. It originally aired on FX on November 16, 2015.

The season takes place in the Upper Midwest in March 1979. It follows the lives of a young couple, Peggy and Ed Blumquist, as they attempt to cover up the hit and run and homicide of Rye Gerhardt, the son of Floyd Gerhardt, matriarch of the Gerhardt crime family. During this time, Minnesota state trooper Lou Solverson, and Rock County sheriff Hank Larsson, investigate three homicides linked to Rye. In the episode, Ed is under arrest, but the Gerhardts are going after him and Peggy.

According to Nielsen Media Research, the episode was seen by an estimated 1.15 million household viewers and gained a 0.3 ratings share among adults aged 18–49. The episode received critical acclaim, with critics praising the writing, character development, tension, humor, cliffhangers and performances (particularly Nick Offerman).

== Plot ==
Lou (Patrick Wilson) arrests Ed (Jesse Plemons) and takes him to the station, while Hank (Ted Danson) stays with Peggy (Kirsten Dunst) at her house. At the station, Noreen (Emily Haine) is allowed to stay with Betsy (Cristin Milioti) after her apartment was burnt down, while Charlie (Allan Dobrescu) is allowed to make a phone call.

At the Gerhardt farm, Bear (Angus Sampson) brutally attacks Dodd (Jeffrey Donovan) for sending Charlie to kill Ed, until they are stopped by Floyd (Jean Smart). She orders Bear to get Charlie out of jail, while Dodd is ordered to kill Ed. Enraged because Dodd called her a "whore", Simone (Rachel Keller) calls Milligan (Bokeem Woodbine) to inform him of her family's plans. She asks him to kill Dodd and he states he will do so, and he leaves with his henchmen. At the police station, Ed asks for a lawyer and he is served by an intoxicated Karl Weathers (Nick Offerman), Luverne's only attorney.

At the Blumquist house, Hank presses Peggy to reveal anything she knows, as a forensics team will be assigned to check the car for any blood. Suddenly, Gerhardt hitmen led by Dodd arrive at the house, intending to search for Ed, despite Hank's claim that he is not home. Hanzee manages to knock Hank unconscious and is sent by Dodd to the police station for Ed, while Dodd and his henchmen search the house. Dodd accidentally shoots one of his henchmen while the other is killed by Peggy with a sink. Peggy suddenly ambushes Dodd and shocks him with his cattle prod. Back at the Gerhardt farm, the house comes under attack when Milligan and his hitmen start shooting.

At the station, Bear arrives with his hitmen, demanding that they hand over Charlie. With back-up units one hour away, Lou asks Karl to help by also serving as Charlie's lawyer, while Lou helps Ed escape through a window to the woods. Karl tells Bear that Charlie faces just 5 years with good behavior if his charges are serious, but Bear's actions can also have repercussions on that and ruin his life. Bear reluctantly leaves with his hitmen. As Lou and Ed leave the woods, they are met by Hank on the other end, having been called by the police of the incident. Ed suddenly runs off, but Lou and Hank don't run after him, as they know where he is going. As they drive off, Hanzee exits the woods and walks toward the path that Ed took.

== Production ==
=== Development ===
In October 2015, it was reported that the sixth episode of the second season would be titled "Rhinoceros", and was to be directed by Jeffrey Reiner and written by series creator Noah Hawley. This was Hawley's 13th writing credit, and Reiner's second directing credit.

== Reception ==
=== Viewers ===
In its original American broadcast, "Rhinoceros" was seen by an estimated 1.15 million household viewers and gained a 0.3 ratings share among adults aged 18–49, according to Nielsen Media Research. This means that 0.3 percent of all households with televisions watched the episode. This was a slight increase in viewership from the previous episode, which was watched by 1.13 million viewers with a 0.3 in the 18-49 demographics.

=== Critical reviews ===
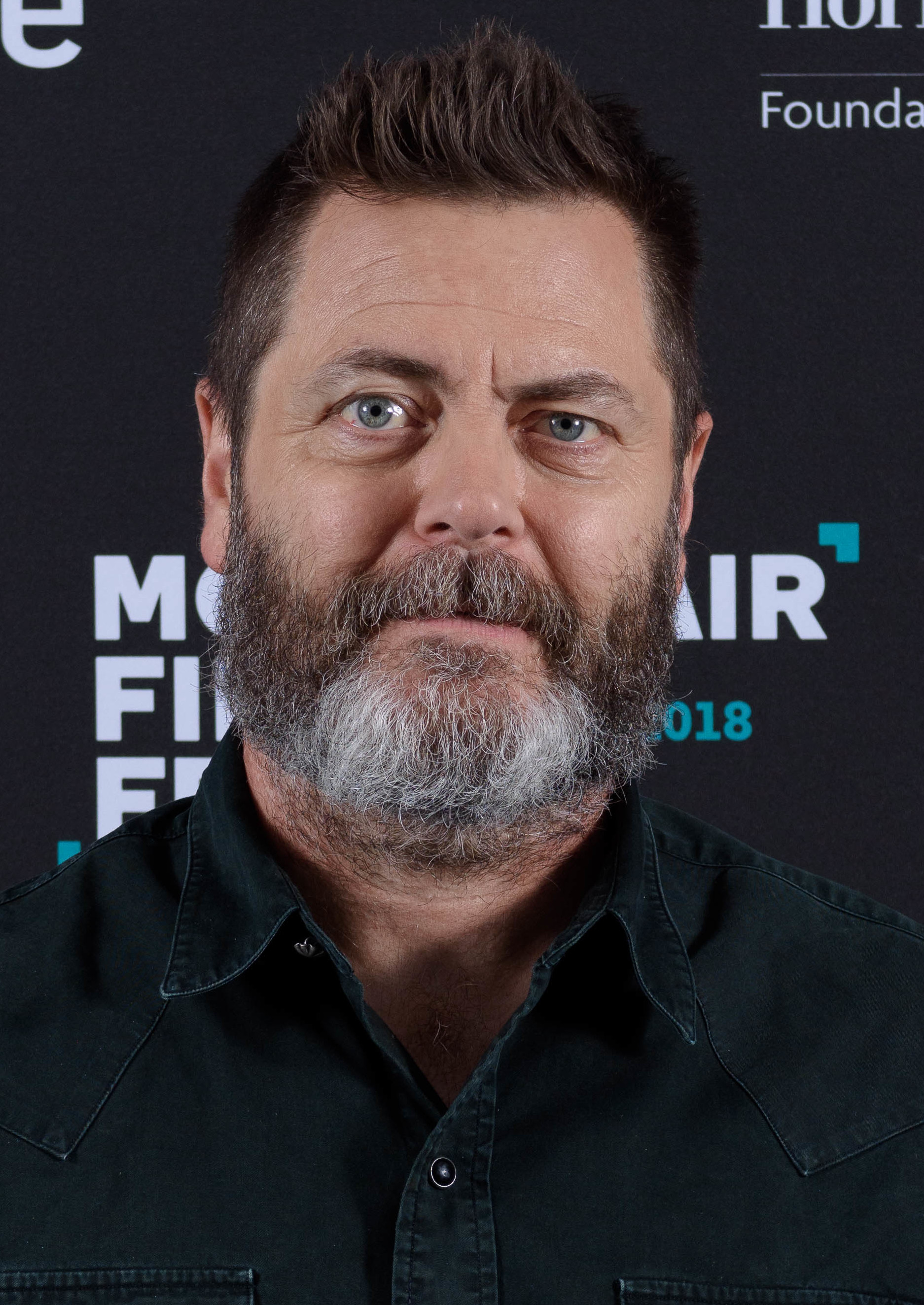
Nick Offerman's performance in the episode was praised by critics.

"Rhinoceros" received critical acclaim. The review aggregator website Rotten Tomatoes reported a 100% approval rating with an average rating of 8.9/10 for the episode, based on 16 reviews. The site's consensus states: "With 'Rhinoceros', Fargo demonstrates its ability to masterfully tell a story that is both tense and hilarious."

Terri Schwartz of IGN gave the episode a perfect "masterpiece" 10 out of 10 and wrote in her verdict, "It's such a pleasure to watch a show where every element is at the top of its game, and that's how it felt watching 'Rhinoceros' play out. It's hard to pick out the one actor who stood out, because everyone - from Kirsten Dunst to Patrick Wilson to Jean Smart to Ted Danson to Nick Offerman, and the list continues - delivered fantastic performances. The way Fargo maintained the level of tension through every scene and hit climactic moment after climactic moment made 'Rhinoceros' another standout episode."

Zack Handlen of The A.V. Club gave the episode an "A" grade and wrote, "'Rhinoceros' is a crackerjack hour of television, holding over the level of tension from last week's episode while upping the ante considerably, as nearly every character finds him or herself facing down a life-or-death situation."

Alan Sepinwall of HitFix wrote, "There's obviously still lots of potential for murder and mayhem ahead, between what Mike Milligan is up to in Fargo and Hanzee's ongoing pursuit of Ed, but 'Rhinoceros' demonstrated throughout that the threat of violence, when executed properly, can be just as powerful a storytelling tool as giving fatal consequence to that violence." Ben Travers of IndieWire gave the episode a "B" grade and wrote, "While 'Rhinoceros' didn't bring out the tip of the horn, so to speak, the tense episode did introduce a number of wanted dynamics." Richard Vine of The Guardian wrote, "For all his bluster, Karl Weathers comes into his own this week, as we first learn that he's the best (sorry, only) lawyer in town, and then get to see him back up his bravado with a sterling performance."

Kevin P. Sullivan of Entertainment Weekly wrote, "'Rhinoceros' ditched some of the heavier Camus for some classic Carpenter, as Lou, Ed, Bear, Hanzee, Charlie, and Karl Weathers (with a K) reenact a politer version of Assault on Precinct 13." Brian Tallerico of Vulture gave the episode a 4 star rating out of 5 and wrote, "Crossing the halfway point of this brilliant second season, we reach what could be considered a transitional episode. It's filled with cliffhangers and unanswered questions, but amplified with enough tension to also entertain. 'Rhinoceros' is the most functional episode of the season, often playing out in actual time as if it were 24 — which is a crossover I would totally watch. 'This is a true story. Events take place in real time, ya know.'" Scott Tobias of The New York Times wrote, "The turf war between the Gerhardts and the Kansas City syndicate... continued to escalate in 'Rhinoceros', an action-packed hour that seems of a piece with last week's episode, which found the show shifting to backstretch payoff mode."

Libby Hill of Los Angeles Times wrote, "Throughout, Peggy's eyes are tired, empty. Dunst is a marvel, making Peggy's fear and resignation palpable with a single glance." Caralynn Lippo of TV Fanatic gave the episode a 4.85 star rating out of 5 and wrote, "Great Caesar's ghost! Another phenomenal installment of Fargo is behind us, and to borrow another probable word from Karl Weathers' endless word bank, I am positively verklempt that we only have a measly four episodes remaining of this spectacular season." Amy Amatangelo of Paste gave the episode a 9.8 rating out of 10 and wrote, "'Rhinoceros' was a masterpiece in timing and direction. I breathed an audible sigh of relief when Bear got back into his car. The genius of the show is that you never know exactly what will happen. It was just as likely that Bear would have stormed the police station, killing everyone in his sight as it was that Karl would convince him to back down."
