= The Gift of the Magi (Fargo) =

- Fargo episode
- Episode no.: Season 2 Episode 5
- Directed by: Jeffrey Reiner
- Written by: Matt Wolpert; Ben Nedivi
- Cinematography by: Dana Gonzales
- Editing by: Regis Kimble
- Production code: XFO02005
- Original air date: November 9, 2015
- Running time: 54 minutes

Guest appearances
- Cristin Milioti as Betsy Solverson; Jeffrey Donovan as Dodd Gerhardt; Bokeem Woodbine as Mike Milligan; Bruce Campbell as Ronald Reagan; Brad Garrett as Joe Bulo; Nick Offerman as Karl Weathers; Elizabeth Marvel as Constance Heck; Keir O'Donnell as Ben Schmidt; Rachel Keller as Simone Gerhardt; Zahn McClarnon as Hanzee Dent; Angus Sampson as Bear Gerhardt

Episode chronology
← Previous "Fear and Trembling"	Next → "Rhinoceros"
- Fargo (season 2)

"The Gift of the Magi" is the fifth episode of the second season of the American anthology black comedy–crime drama television series Fargo. It is the 15th overall episode of the series and was written by consulting producers Matt Wolpert and Ben Nedivi and directed by Jeffrey Reiner. It originally aired on FX on November 9, 2015.

The season takes place in the Upper Midwest in March 1979. It follows the lives of a young couple, Peggy and Ed Blumquist, as they attempt to cover up the hit and run and homicide of Rye Gerhardt, the son of Floyd Gerhardt, matriarch of the Gerhardt crime family. During this time, Minnesota state trooper Lou Solverson, and Rock County sheriff Hank Larsson, investigate three homicides linked to Rye. In the episode, the Gerhardts start their counter strike against Kansas City, while Peggy and Ed realize their lives are in danger.

According to Nielsen Media Research, the episode was seen by an estimated 1.13 million household viewers and gained a 0.3 ratings share among adults aged 18–49. The episode received critical acclaim, with critics praising the writing, character development, tension, shootout sequences, performances and Bruce Campbell's guest appearance.

== Plot ==
Hanzee (Zahn McClarnon) shows Rye's belt buckle to Floyd (Jean Smart), Dodd (Jeffrey Donovan) and Bear (Angus Sampson), revealing that Ed Blumquist (Jesse Plemons) is responsible. However, Hanzee and Dodd alter the story, indicating that the person responsible is a hitman known as "The Butcher", who works for the Kansas City crime family and killed him to use it as a leverage.

Lou Solverson (Patrick Wilson) serves as security detail for presidential candidate Ronald Reagan (Bruce Campbell), who delivers a speech to the townspeople. While hunting in the woods, Joe Bulo (Brad Garrett) and his criminal partners are attacked by Gerhardt hitmen. Bulo flees the area, while his partners are killed in the shootout. The Kitchen brothers manage to kill most of the Gerhardts, but they are subsequently attacked by Hanzee, who kills Wayne (Todd Man) and knocks out Gale (Brad Mann). He then catches up with Bulo and kills him. Even though Dodd is delighted by the deaths, Floyd still demands that they find "The Butcher". Charlie (Allan Dobrescu), wanting to prove himself, asks to help in killing Ed. Dodd allows him to go with Virgil (Greg Bryk), one of his henchmen.

Simone (Rachel Keller) meets with Milligan (Bokeem Woodbine), who is frustrated by the deaths in the woods, also showing her that the Gerhardts sent Bulo's head in a box. He demands that she lets him know of anything by working as a spy for him or he will kill her. Peggy (Kirsten Dunst) tries to convince Ed to leave their life for a new one in California, but Ed does not intend to leave his dreams. He then goes to work at the shop, where Charlie has entered to kill him, as well as to kill any possible witnesses. However, Charlie bonds with Noreen (Emily Haine) over their admiration for Albert Camus and in a panic, ends up buying meat and leaves the shop without harming anyone, disappointing Virgil.

During another stop for Reagan's campaign, Lou asks for guidance in his wife's illness, although Reagan is unable to answer anything. Peggy decides to run away by herself and gets her car back from the shop. However, she decides to sell the car to Sonny (Daniel Beirne) for a reduced fee and returns back to Luverne. Virgil once again tells Charlie to kill Ed and Noreen. Charlie enters the shop, but in a panic, accidentally causes a fire in the kitchen. Virgil then enters and fights with Ed, which ends when Ed kills him with a cleaver. Ed takes Noreen and an unconscious Charlie out of the shop as it engulfs in flames. Devastated by the loss of the shop, Ed leaves the scene.

That night, Lou arrives at the butcher shop crime scene, where Hank (Ted Danson) consoles Noreen, horrified to discover the extent of the damage. Ed returns home, where Peggy tells him she sold her car so he could buy the butcher shop. Ed informs her of the incident and states they must leave town as their lives are in danger. Just then, they hear police sirens approaching their house.

== Production ==
=== Development ===
In October 2015, it was reported that the fifth episode of the second season would be titled "The Gift of the Magi", and was to be directed by Jeffrey Reiner and written by consulting producers Matt Wolpert and Ben Nedivi. This was Wolpert's first writing credit, Nedivi's first writing credit, and Reiner's first directing credit.

=== Casting ===
In March 2015, it was announced that Bruce Campbell would guest star as Ronald Reagan. In January 2015, John Landgraf previewed that Reagan would be a central point of the season, explaining that "Reagan is a character in it and some of the movies he's reputed to have made", with some characters interacting with him. Campbell, who appeared in the 1996 film as an uncredited soap star, joked that "I'm the only actor who's been in both the movie and the TV show so I think I'm qualified."

To practice his impression, Campbell imitated the character with executive producer John Cameron, a high school friend of his during Reagan's presidency. He also added, "I think mostly with Reagan, you've got to believe what you say. He believed what he said. He was a true believer in himself. I don't think he was a bullshit artist."

== Reception ==
=== Viewers ===
In its original American broadcast, "The Gift of the Magi" was seen by an estimated 1.13 million household viewers and gained a 0.3 ratings share among adults aged 18–49, according to Nielsen Media Research. This means that 0.3 percent of all households with televisions watched the episode. This was a 12% decrease in viewership from the previous episode, which was watched by 1.28 million viewers with a 0.4 in the 18-49 demographics.

=== Critical reviews ===
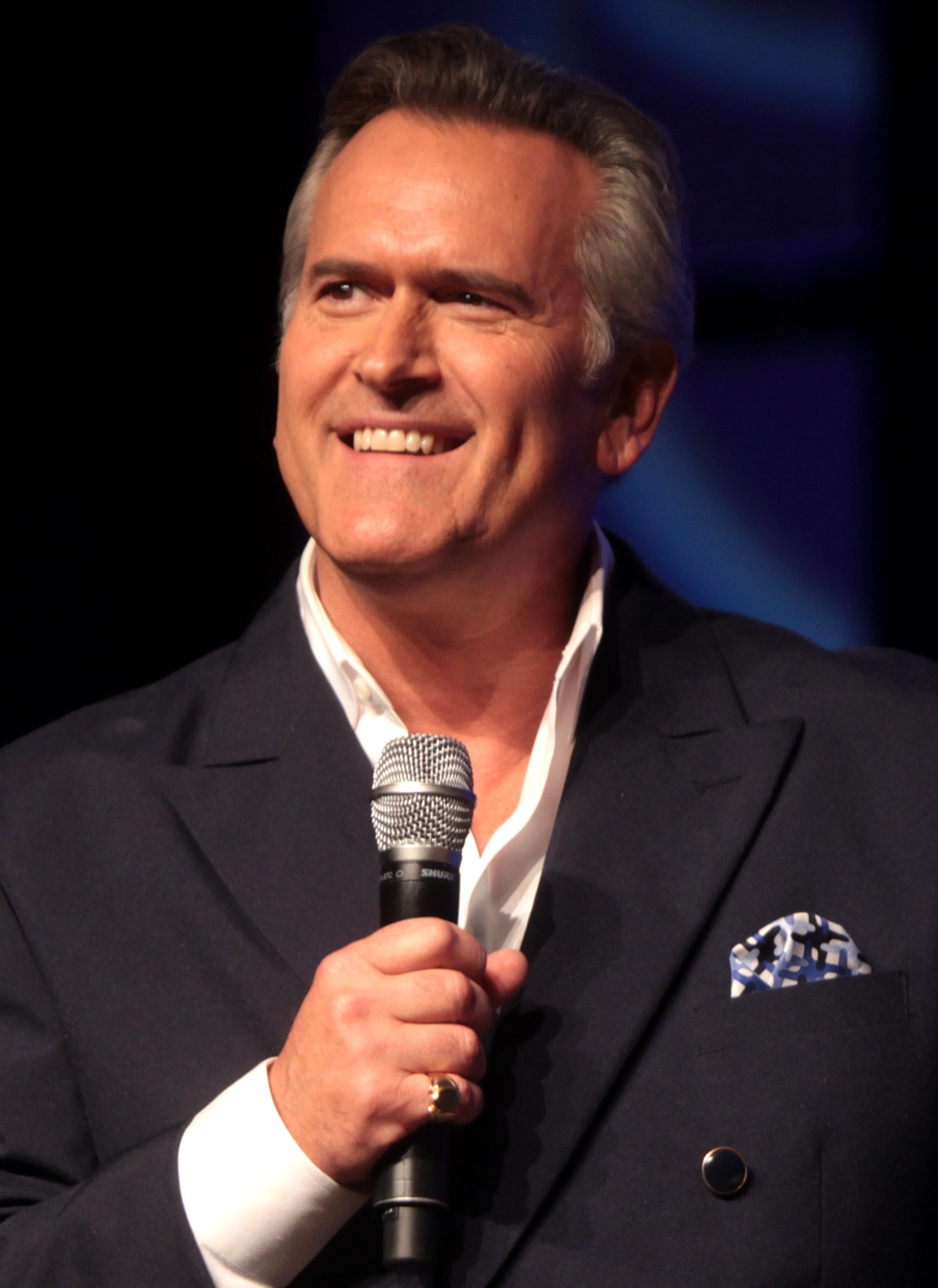
Bruce Campbell's performance as Ronald Reagan was praised by critics.

"The Gift of the Magi" received universal acclaim. The review aggregator website Rotten Tomatoes reported a 100% approval rating with an average rating of 9.1/10 for the episode, based on 16 reviews. The site's consensus states: "The masterful 'The Gift of the Magi' heralds the awaited arrival of Bruce Campbell as Ronald Reagan - and ratchets up the tension and suspense going into the second half of the season."

Terri Schwartz of IGN gave the episode a perfect "masterpiece" 10 out of 10 and wrote in her verdict, "As Fargo: Season 2 reaches its midpoint, it is filling in the shades of its moral lessons and examinations to paint new portraits of American lives and struggles. The episode that was trumpeted for its Bruce Campbell guest appearances was overshadowed by the sacrifices its characters made for one another and the irreversible choices they are stuck with. Is it still worth pushing the boulder up the hill?"

Zack Handlen of The A.V. Club gave the episode an "A" grade and wrote, "Regardless, 'The Gift Of The Magi' shakes up the status quo in a way that will surely have a major impact in the weeks ahead. After a brief holding pattern, war has officially broken out, and the Blomquists aren't going to be able to keep themselves above the fray any longer."

Alan Sepinwall of HitFix wrote, "'The Gift of the Magi' is making clear that fancy rhetoric isn't enough, and that even the toughest of leaders – also including Floyd and Joe – can fail to grasp how deep the problems run." Ben Travers of IndieWire gave the episode a "B-" grade and wrote, "Fargo has reached the point that it automatically becomes a better show whenever Nick Offerman wiggles his way on screen." Richard Vine of The Guardian wrote, "After being teased with posters and film shoots, we get our first real world sighting of Ronald Reagan this week. Cult actor Bruce Campbell steps up to the plate with a great impression."

Kevin P. Sullivan of Entertainment Weekly wrote, "I'm beginning to feel that an appropriate subtitle to the second season of Fargo would be "No, This Was The Best Episode Yet," as it's what I've exclaimed after nearly every hour." Brian Tallerico of Vulture gave the episode a 4 star rating out of 5 and wrote, "Don't get me wrong. It's still more entertaining than nearly any other way you could spend a Monday night, but the bar set by the first four episodes of the season dropped a bit this week, however slightly." Scott Tobias of The New York Times wrote, "The rhetorical battle between Jimmy Carter's sober 'malaise' moment and Reagan's relentless optimism settles strangely on Luverne, as many political speeches do to ordinary people."

Libby Hill of Los Angeles Times wrote, "Watching Fargo feels like settling in for the latest chapter of a fairy tale, wherein the good are threatened, the evil are encroaching, and we are left to decide for ourselves what lesson we're to take from it all." Caralynn Lippo of TV Fanatic gave the episode a perfect 5 star rating out of 5 and wrote, "Talk about tension! This masterful installment of Fargo turned the dial up to 11 on all fronts, while continuing to complicate the existing relationships between the characters." Amy Amatangelo of Paste gave the episode a 9.8 rating out of 10 and wrote, "The episode was masterful in its suspense and in its reveals. We don't see Joe Bulo die. We only see the top of his curly head in a box. The end with Peggy and Ed looking out at the police cars on their front lawn was ominous. The war has come to them and there's no escaping now."
