= Windfall (2022 film) =

2022 film by Charlie McDowell

- Release poster
- Directed by: Charlie McDowell
- Screenplay by: Justin Lader; Andrew Kevin Walker
- Story by: Charlie McDowell; Jason Segel; Justin Lader; Andrew Kevin Walker
- Produced by: Jack Selby; Lily Collins; Jesse Plemons; Charlie McDowell; Jason Segel; Duncan Montgomery; Alex Orlovsky
- Starring: Lily Collins; Jesse Plemons; Jason Segel
- Cinematography: Isiah Donté Lee
- Edited by: David Marks
- Music by: Danny Bensi; Saunder Jurriaans
- Production companies: High Frequency Entertainment; Cloudbreak Pictures; Mutressa Movies
- Distributed by: Netflix
- Release date: March 18, 2022
- Running time: 92 minutes
- Country: United States
- Language: English

Windfall is a 2022 American crime thriller film directed by Charlie McDowell from a screenplay by Andrew Kevin Walker and Justin Lader. The film stars Jason Segel, Lily Collins, and Jesse Plemons.

Windfall was released on March 18, 2022, by Netflix.

== Plot ==
A wealthy CEO and his wife come to their vacation home only to discover a burglar. The CEO agrees to give him money and let the matter drop without calling the police, but the burglar locks them in a sauna.

Returning to his car, the burglar spots a camera which he suspects has been recording him. He returns to the house and confronts them, demanding $500,000 in cash. The CEO makes arrangements for the money to be delivered the following afternoon.

Several conversations between the trio make it clear that the CEO and his wife are in a strained relationship, although the CEO looks forward to having children. At night, the wife tells the burglar that she is not happy with her life; the burglar tells her to stop calling herself a victim for marrying a man for his wealth.

The next day, the CEO guesses the burglar was an employee made redundant by the algorithm he has invented, which aids companies undergoing downsizing. A gardener arrives to work on the property. He takes them outside and talks to the CEO about planting an oak tree. The CEO writes 'Call 911' on the gardener's sketch. The burglar takes notice and orders the gardener into the house. The wife and the burglar criticize the CEO for jeopardizing another person's life.

After a few hours, the CEO finally breaks. He belittles the burglar and claims he will not do anything to them because his life is meaningless. After the burglar shoots a warning shot, the gardener tries to escape. He trips and falls through a glass door, and a shard of glass pierces his neck, killing him.

The money is left in front of the house, so the wife retrieves it. She sees a passing car but does not signal it before returning inside. The burglar ties up the CEO and his wife in separate rooms. The burglar admits to the CEO that he wanted to know what it was like to live like a rich person. He reveals to him that his wife is taking birth control pills. Cutting herself free, she kills the burglar with a small statue. She then shoots her husband dead, plants the gun in the burglar's hand, and leaves the property.

== Cast ==
- Jason Segel as Nobody
- Lily Collins as Wife
- Jesse Plemons as CEO
- Omar Leyva as Gardener

== Production ==
Filming took place in March 2021 in Ojai, California, with production fully wrapping in July. Later that month, Netflix acquired the film for a "major eight-figures" sum.

== Reception ==
On the review aggregator website Rotten Tomatoes, 60% of 82 critics' reviews are positive, with an average rating of 5.8/10. The website's consensus reads: "Windfall is hardly a bounty of cinematic riches, but a killer cast keeps this minimalistic thriller from going creatively bankrupt." Metacritic, which uses a weighted average, assigned the film a score of 52 out of 100, based on 21 critics, indicating "mixed or average" reviews.
