= Kirsten Miller =

American novelist

- Born: 1973 (age 52–53)
- Occupation: Author
- Writing career
- Notable work: Kiki Strike series

Kirsten Miller (born 1973) is an American novelist and the creator of the Kiki Strike book series. Her first book in the series, Kiki Strike: Inside the Shadow City, came out in 2006. Her second book in the series, The Empress's Tomb, came out in October 2007. The series chronicles the adventures of Kiki Strike, Ananka Fishbein and their friends in New York City. In 2001, the front lawn of a Manhattan nursing home collapsed to reveal an underground room, giving Kirsten the idea for the first book, set in the tunnels and rooms beneath the city. She created Kiki Strike and the Irregulars (named after Sherlock Holmes' Baker Street Irregulars) to explore these secret passageways.

The first book in her other series, The Eternal Ones, was released August 10, 2010.

She was the co-author of a three-book children's series with Jason Segel named Nightmares!, of which the first book was released in the fall of 2014.

Kirsten Miller lives and works in New York City.

== Works ==
=== Standalone novels ===
- Lula Dean's Little Library of Banned Books (2024)
- How to Lead a Life of Crime (2013)
- Don't Tell a Soul (2021)
- The Change (2022)

" The Women of Wild Hill (2025)

=== Series ===
Kiki Strike

- Inside the Shadow City (2006)
- The Empress's Tomb (2007)
- The Darkness Dwellers (2013)

The Eternal Ones

- The Eternal Ones (2010)
- All You Desire (2011)

Nightmares! by Miller and Jason Segel

- Nightmares! (2014)
- Nightmares! The Sleepwalker Tonic (2015)
- Nightmares! The Lost Lullaby (2016)

Last Reality by Miller and Jason Segel

- Otherworld (2017)
- OtherEarth (2018)
- OtherLife (2019)
