= Nightmares! =

Novel series by Jason Segel and Kirsten Miller

- The Nightmares! logo, used first in the book cover and later adopted as the official logo.
- Nightmares! (2014); Nightmares! The Sleepwalker Tonic (2015); Nightmares! The Lost Lullaby (2016)
- Author: Jason Segel and Kirsten Miller
- Cover artist: Karl Kwasny
- Country: United States
- Language: English
- Genre: young adult literature, fantasy, adventure and children's fiction
- Publisher: Penguin Random House
- Published: 2014–2016
- Media type: Print (hardcover and paperback), audiobook, e-book
- No. of books: 3

Nightmares! is a young adult children's literature series co-authored by Jason Segel and Kirsten Miller. As of 5 November 2014, the series has been on The New York Times Best Seller list for children's book series. The series consists of three titles.

The series centers on Charlie Laird, a child with recurrent nightmares, which begin when he moves into his stepmom's mansion.
