= List of awards and nominations received by Jesse Plemons =

Jesse Plemons awards and nominations
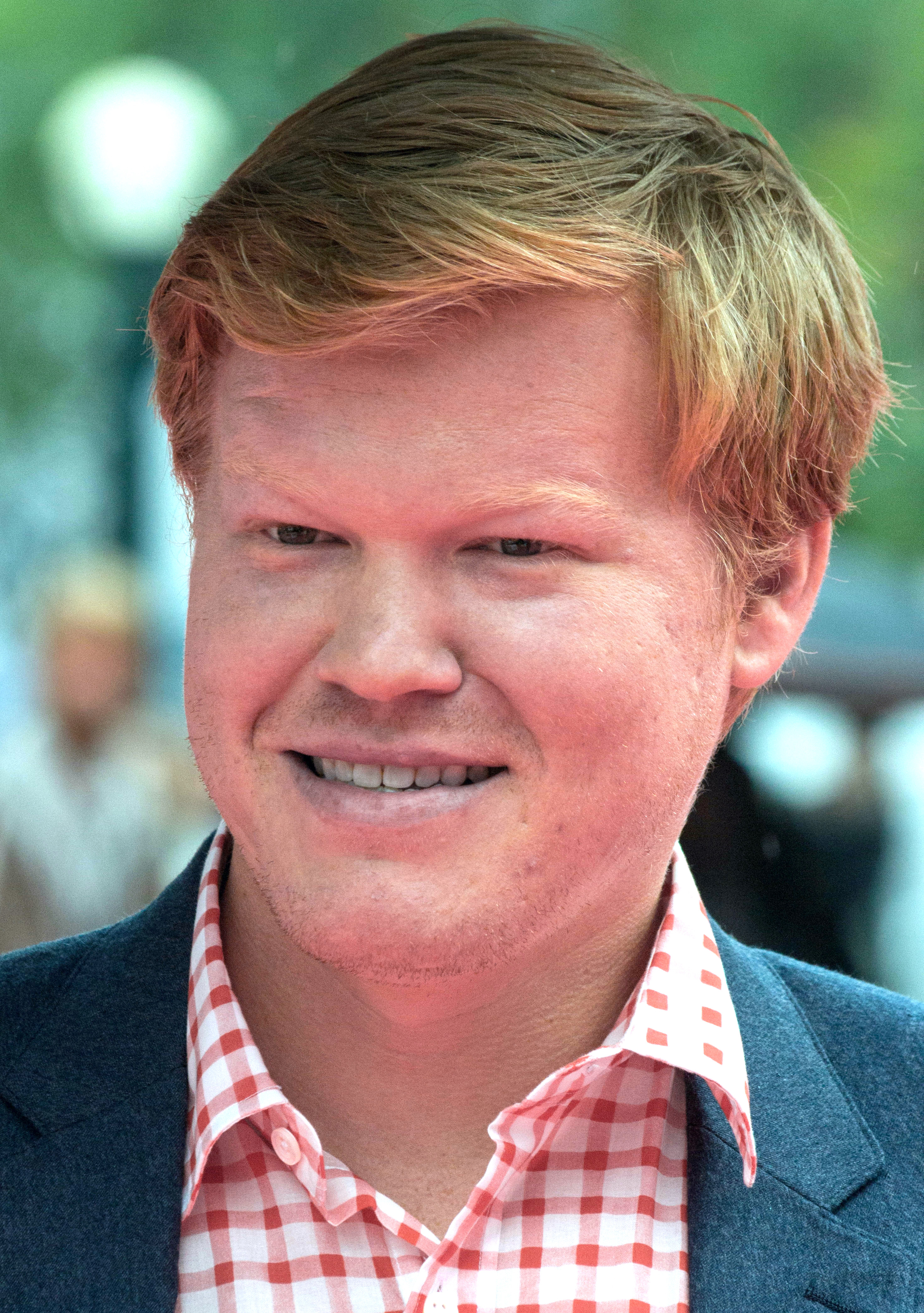
- Plemons in 2015
Awards and nominations
Award	Wins	Nominations
Academy Awards	0	1
Actor Awards	1	4
BAFTA Awards	0	2
Critics' Choice Awards	2	9
Emmy Awards	0	3
Golden Globes	0	2

Totals (Note: Certain award groups do not simply award one winner. They acknowledge several different recipients, have runners-up, and have third place. Since this is a specific recognition and is different from losing an award, runner-up mentions are considered wins in this award tally. For simplification and to avoid errors, each award in this list has been presumed to have had a prior nomination.)
- Wins: 6
- Nominations: 48

The following is a list of awards and nominations received by American actor Jesse Plemons. Plemons has received various awards and nominations. For his work in television, he has received three Primetime Emmy Award nominations, four Actor Award nominations, winning the second, and two BAFTA nominations.

In 2021, Plemons starred as a rancher in Jane Campion's The Power of the Dog (2021). For his work, Plemons received a BAFTA nomination and an Academy Award nomination for Best Supporting Actor.

For his performance as multiple people in the Yorgos Lanthimos anthology film Kinds of Kindness (2024), Plemons won the Cannes Film Festival Award for Best Actor and was nominated for the Golden Globe Award for Best Actor in a Motion Picture – Musical or Comedy. For his portrayal of a conspiracy theory–obsessed beekeeper in Lanthimos's following film Bugonia (2025), he was once again nominated for the Golden Globe Award for Best Actor in a Motion Picture – Musical or Comedy, as well as the Actor Award for Outstanding Performance by a Male Actor in a Leading Role and BAFTA Award for Best Actor in a Leading Role.

== Major associations ==
=== Academy Awards ===
Year	Category	Nominated work	Result	Ref.
2021	Best Supporting Actor	The Power of the Dog	Nominated	

=== Actor Awards ===
Year	Category	Work	Result	Ref.
2013	Outstanding Ensemble in a Drama Series	Breaking Bad	Nominated	
2014	Outstanding Ensemble in a Drama Series	Breaking Bad	Won	
2024	Outstanding Cast in a Motion Picture	Killers of the Flower Moon	Nominated	
2026	Outstanding Male Actor in a Leading Role	Bugonia	Nominated	

=== BAFTA Awards ===
Year	Category	Nominated work	Result	Ref.
British Academy Film Awards
2022	Best Actor in a Supporting Role	The Power of the Dog	Nominated	
2026	Best Actor in a Leading Role	Bugonia	Nominated	

=== Critics' Choice Awards ===
Year	Category	Nominated work	Result	Ref.
Critics' Choice Movie Awards
2019	Best Acting Ensemble	Vice	Nominated	
2020	Best Acting Ensemble	The Irishman	Won	
2021	Best Acting Ensemble	Judas and the Black Messiah	Nominated	
2022	Best Acting Ensemble	The Power of the Dog	Nominated	
2024	Best Acting Ensemble	Killers of the Flower Moon	Nominated	
Critics' Choice Television Awards
2016	Best Supporting Actor in a Movie/Miniseries	Fargo	Won	
2020	Best Supporting Actor in a Movie/Miniseries	El Camino: A Breaking Bad Movie	Nominated	
2024	Best Supporting Actor in a Movie/Miniseries	Love & Death	Nominated	
Critics' Choice Super Awards
2026	Best Actor in a Science Fiction/Fantasy Movie	Bugonia	Nominated	

=== Emmy Awards ===
Year	Category	Nominated work	Result	Ref.
Primetime Emmy Awards
2016	Outstanding Supporting Actor in a Limited or Anthology Series or Movie	Fargo	Nominated	
2018	Outstanding Lead Actor in a Limited or Anthology Series or Movie	Black Mirror: USS Callister	Nominated	
2023	Outstanding Supporting Actor in a Limited or Anthology Series or Movie	Love & Death	Nominated	

=== Golden Globe Awards ===
Year	Category	Nominated work	Result	Ref.
2025	Best Actor in a Motion Picture – Musical or Comedy	Kinds of Kindness	Nominated	
2026	Best Actor in a Motion Picture – Musical or Comedy	Bugonia	Nominated	

== Other awards ==
=== Cannes Film Festival ===
Year	Category	Nominated work	Result	Ref.
2024	Best Actor	Kinds of Kindness	Won	

=== Gotham Awards ===
Year	Category	Nominated work	Result	Ref.
2020	Best Actor	I'm Thinking of Ending Things	Nominated	

=== Independent Spirit Awards ===
Year	Category	Nominated work	Result	Ref.
2017	Best Male Lead	Other People	Nominated	

=== Irish Film & Television Awards ===
Year	Category	Nominated work	Result	Ref.
2026	Best International Actor	Bugonia	Nominated	

=== Satellite Awards ===
Year	Category	Nominated work	Result	Ref.
2026	Best Actor in a Motion Picture – Comedy or Musical	Bugonia	Nominated	

== Other associations ==
Award	Year	Category	Work	Result	Ref.
Alliance of Women Film Journalists	2022	Best Actor in a Supporting Role	The Power of the Dog	Nominated	
Astra Film Awards	2026	Best Actor - Comedy or Musical	Bugonia	Nominated	
Astra Midseason Movie Awards	2024	Best Supporting Actor	Civil War	Runner-up	
Chicago Indie Critics	2026	Best Actor	Bugonia	Nominated	
Chlotrudis Awards	2022	Best Supporting Actor	The Power of the Dog	Nominated	
Columbus Film Critics Association	2022	Best Supporting Actor	The Power of the Dog	Nominated	
Columbus Film Critics Association	2026	Best Lead Performance	Bugonia	Nominated	
Detroit Film Critics Society	2018	Best Supporting Actor	Game Night	Nominated	
Greater Western New York Film Critics Association	2025	Best Actor	Bugonia	Nominated	
Indiana Film Journalists Association	2018	Best Supporting Actor	Game Night	Nominated	
Indiana Film Journalists Association	2020	Best Actor	I'm Thinking of Ending Things	Nominated	
Indiana Film Journalists Association	2025	Best Lead Performance	Bugonia	Nominated	
Las Vegas Film Critics Society	2025	Best Actor	Bugonia	Nominated	
London Film Critics' Circle	2022	Supporting Actor of the Year	The Power of the Dog	Nominated	
Milano International Film Festival Awards	2012	Best Supporting Actor	Meeting Spencer	Nominated	
Minnesota Film Critics Association	2022	Best Supporting Actor	The Power of the Dog	Nominated	
New York Film Critics Online	2025	Best Actor	Bugonia	Nominated	
Online Film & Television Association	2016	Best Supporting Actor in a Motion Picture, Limited or Anthology Series	Fargo	Nominated	
Online Film & Television Association	2018	Best Actor in a Motion Picture or Limited Series	Black Mirror: USS Callister	Nominated	
Online Film & Television Association	2023	Best Supporting Actor in a Motion Picture, Limited or Anthology Series	Love & Death	Nominated	
San Diego Film Critics Society	2018	Best Comedic Performance	Game Night	Runner-up	
Saturn Awards	2018	Best Guest Starring Role on Television	Black Mirror: USS Callister	Nominated	
Vancouver Film Critics Circle	2022	Best Supporting Actor	The Power of the Dog	Nominated	
Young Artist Awards	2002	Best Performance in a TV Drama Series: Guest Starring Young Actor	The Guardian	Nominated	
Young Artist Awards	2007	Best Performance in a TV Series – Supporting Young Actor	Friday Night Lights	Nominated	
