= The Discovery (film) =

2017 film by Charlie McDowell

- Official poster
- Directed by: Charlie McDowell
- Written by: Justin Lader; Charlie McDowell
- Produced by: Alex Orlovsky; James D. Stern
- Starring: Jason Segel; Rooney Mara; Jesse Plemons; Riley Keough; Robert Redford
- Cinematography: Sturla Brandth Grøvlen
- Edited by: Jennifer Lilly
- Music by: Saunder Jurriaans; Danny Bensi
- Production companies: Endgame Entertainment; Protagonist Pictures; A-Lo Films
- Distributed by: Netflix
- Release dates: January 20, 2017 (Sundance); March 31, 2017 (United States/Worldwide)
- Running time: 102 minutes
- Countries: United States; United Kingdom
- Language: English

The Discovery is a 2017 British-American romantic science fiction film, directed by Charlie McDowell from a screenplay by himself and Justin Lader. It stars Rooney Mara, Jason Segel, Robert Redford, Jesse Plemons, Riley Keough, and Ron Canada.

The film had its world premiere at the Sundance Film Festival on January 20, 2017. It was released on March 31, 2017, by Netflix.

== Plot ==
An interviewer questions Thomas Harbor, the man who scientifically proved the existence of an afterlife, a discovery that led to an extremely high suicide rate. The interviewer asks Harbor if he feels responsible, and he says no. Directly after, a film crew member kills himself on air.

On the second anniversary of the discovery, Harbor's son Will travels on a ferry where he meets Isla. They have a conversation and he notes she looks very familiar. Will says he is upset people keep killing themselves, while Isla thinks it's an easy way out. He shares a memory he had while being dead for a minute, where he saw a young boy at a beach.

Will's brother Toby picks him up and drives him to an isolated mansion where their father is continuing his research. Will notes the large number of helpers, who Toby says used to be suicidal and now have a new purpose. He meets Lacey and Cooper, his father's aides. Thomas is periodically "put under" and revived while hooked to various machines. When they speak, Will blames him for starting a cult and for the high suicide rate. He announces his intention to get Thomas to recant his statement about the afterlife to stop the suicides.

Later, Will sees Isla on the beach preparing to commit suicide. He barely saves her and brings her to the mansion, where she is taken in. At a later meeting with the occupants, Thomas reveals his new work - a machine that can record what people see in the afterlife.

To test the machine, Toby, Will and Isla steal the corpse of Pat Phillips from the morgue. Will reveals to Isla the reason for his resentment towards his father: his mother killed herself when Thomas was too distracted with his work to notice her.

Phillips's corpse is hooked to the machine, but nothing happens. After everyone leaves, Will undoes his earlier sabotage on the machine. Immediately the screen shows a video sequence of Pat Phillips driving to a hospital, visiting someone and fighting with a woman there. Will visits the hospital, but finds the hallway from the video gone.

During a meeting, Thomas confronts Lacey about telling others the test failed and expels her from the mansion. Will shows Isla the recording, theorizing that the machine records memory rather than the afterlife. They find a record of Pat Phillips's father, who died in the hospital. Further investigations reveals the events in the recording don't match what actually happened. Pat never visited his dying father in the hospital.

Isla confides in Will that she had a son, who died while she was asleep. Isla and Will grow closer together and share a kiss, which is interrupted by Toby.

Together they rush to Thomas, who is hooked to the machine. They observe he is seeing the night their mother killed herself, except that he stops her. They are able to revive Thomas, who concludes the afterlife is an alternate version of their existing life, only with different choices made. They agree to destroy the machine, as this revelation would provoke millions of suicides by people wanting to improve the lives they have. Thomas prepares to hold a speech, which is interrupted by Lacey shooting Isla, claiming she has just "relocated" her. She dies in Will's arms.

Later, a devastated Will hooks himself up with the machine. He arrives back on the ferry, where he meets Isla who reveals that this conversation is a part of his memory and she is a part of him. She reveals Will is living in an afterlife loop trying to prevent Isla's death, restarting on the ferry every time he dies in each life. Isla says he was only meant to save her from suicide and now they can both move on. Although Toby and Thomas try to revive Will, he dies, promising Isla to remember her.

In an alternate reality, Will stands on the beach, where he sees a little boy and gets him out of the water. The little boy's mother, Isla, arrives and thanks him. They don't recognise each other. After she leaves, he walks away, but starts to experience a sense of familiarity at who Isla is, even though he has never met her in this reality. A sense of knowing someone he has never met but he doesn’t know how. He stops and slowly looks back and appears to make a decision to follow his intuition and go to be with her. A post-credits scene shows Toby playing guitar in the meeting room, all the seats empty.

== Cast ==
- Rooney Mara as Isla
- Jason Segel as Will Harbor
- Jesse Plemons as Toby Harbor
- Riley Keough as Lacey
- Robert Redford as Thomas Harbor
- Ron Canada as Cooper
- Mary Steenburgen as Interviewer

== Production ==
In October 2015, it was revealed that Rooney Mara and Nicholas Hoult had been cast in the film, with Charlie McDowell directing from the script, co-written with Justin Lader, and Alex Orlovsky and James D. Stern producing under their Verisimilitude and Endgame Entertainment banners, respectively. In March 2016, it was revealed that Robert Redford and Jason Segel had joined the cast of the film, with Segel replacing Hoult who had to drop out due to scheduling conflicts. That same month, Riley Keough and Jesse Plemons joined the cast. Saunder Jurriaans and Danny Bensi composed the film's score.

Principal photography began on March 28, 2016, in Newport, Rhode Island. Production concluded on May 1, 2016.

== Release ==
In June 2016, Netflix acquired global distribution rights to the film, with a planned 2017 release. The film had its world premiere at the Sundance Film Festival on January 20, 2017. The film was released on March 31, 2017.

== Reception ==
The Discovery received mixed reviews from film critics. It holds a 48% approval rating on review aggregator website Rotten Tomatoes, based on 64 reviews, with a weighted average of 5.60/10. The website's critics consensus reads: "The Discovery looks fascinating on paper, but in spite of its thought-provoking premise and starry ensemble, it's a disappointing case of untapped potential." On Metacritic, the film holds a rating of 54 out of 100, based on 19 critics, indicating "mixed or average reviews".

Dennis Harvey of Variety gave the film a generally negative review, saying "Though The Discovery starts out with a great premise, its mystery dissipates over a somewhat tepid course as the concept ultimately heads in a direction we've seen many times before" and criticized the chemistry between Segel and Mara.
