= Kiki Strike =

Book series by Kirsten Miller

Inside the Shadow City
- First edition cover
- Author: Kirsten Miller
- Language: English
- Series: Kiki Strike
- Genre: Novel
- Publisher: Bloomsbury Publishing
- Publication date: 2006
- Publication place: United States
- Media type: Print (Hardback)
- Pages: 387 pp.
- ISBN: 978-1-58234-960-2
- OCLC: 62341439
- LC Class: PZ7.M6223 Kik 2006
- Followed by: The Empress's Tomb

The Kiki Strike series, by Kirsten Miller, is a series of three novels revolving around the adventures of six girls in Manhattan, and currently consists of three books (Inside the Shadow City, The Empress's Tomb and The Darkness Dwellers).

Told from Ananka Fishbein's point of view, these books describe the adventures of the Irregulars, a group of girls who join to explore an underground world beneath Manhattan called "The Shadow City." During this, they must fight against various villains and help save the city of New York numerous times.

== Series titles ==
- Inside the Shadow City (2006)
- The Empress's Tomb (2007)
- "The Darkness Dwellers" (2013)

== Main characters ==
Ananka Fishbein (pronounced un-AH-nka Fish-Bean)

Ananka attends a private school called Atalanta, and lives in a small apartment nearby that is crammed with books on every subject imaginable. Although she does not believe it, she is quite intelligent and very eccentric. She has brown hair, is described as chubby in Inside the Shadow City, and thinks of herself as very unattractive. Later in the book she is given a makeover by Betty, and finally sees herself as pretty.

When asked what she would like to be when she grows up, she says she would like to study Giant Squid. At the beginning of the series, she needs to be led by Kiki Strike, but by the end, she is a leader herself.

Ananka is not gifted in school (although very intelligent) because she finds school to be an utter waste of time. However, she learns much more important things, such as how to survive in dangerous situations and to look at things and see them as they were in the past. Her parents do not recognise her special talents and are instead very focused on how she does in school. Her grandfather was a rat lover and invented a way to safely and effectively get rid of them, The Reverse Pied Piper (a device which the Irregulars recreate and use throughout the series).

Ananka is the narrator of the series.

Kiki Strike

Kiki Strike is a small, albino girl who founds the Irregulars and is often considered the leader of the group. Although her platinum hair, a height of under five feet, and unhealthily pale complexion are off-putting, she is described as "strikingly beautiful" on many occasions. She's an excellent leader but sometimes can be cold and insensitive to the needs of the other irregulars. Her real name is 'Katarina Galatzina' but this was changed when she was poisoned by her jealous aunt Livia Galetzina, who wanted to take over the throne.

Kiki is always determined to help everybody who needs help. She is clever and knows multiple languages and martial arts. She also is reputed to have an extensive knowledge of weaponry from her caregiver, Verushka. Kiki's cousin, Princess Sidonia, is also her nemesis, as Sidonia's mother poisoned Kiki's whole family, in an attempt to take the Pokrovian throne. Sidonia is determined to kill Kiki, because if Kiki dies, she will be next in line for the Pokrovian throne. Kiki, in turn, wants to get Sidonia's pink diamond ring so that she can use the inscribed instructions to find directions to the proof that Sidonia's mother had killed her mother. Kiki has escaped to New York with her caregiver and friend Verushka Kozlova, whom she lives with. Due to the poison, unfortunately, Kiki is allergic to everything except cafe au lait and a special nutritious gruel that Veruksha prepares for her.

Luz Lopez

Luz Lopez is a gifted mechanic and inventor, and she is good friends with DeeDee Morlock. Although Luz is innocent, she has a criminal record which she is often worried about. She is very poor, and her family is said to have escaped from Cuba when she was a child. Because of this, Luz finds it difficult to trust other people and often lashes out when her shortcomings are pointed out.

DeeDee Morlock

DeeDee Morlock is an incredibly talented chemist, and she concocts every potion, poison, and perfume the Irregulars use during their adventures. Her parents are both scientists at Columbia University. She is very clumsy and very kind. She is the daughter of a chemistry professor. She gets in a bad accident during one of the Irregulars' adventures in The Shadow City.

She is first introduced at a Girl Scouts meeting, where she has just "succeeded in refining a particularly dangerous strain of botulism", which is described as a poison that can reverse wrinkles and all signs of age. She is the scientist of the group, and inventor of many clever concoctions, including several explosives; Morlock's Miracle Mixture, a self-made substance which repels poisons when digested; and Fille Fiable a concoction used to make one seem trustworthy.

DeeDee wears dreadlocks that often get singed or burnt off during her experiments. She receives a scar on her forehead from an explosion that takes place in Inside the Shadow City.

Betty Bent

The third Irregular to be introduced, Betty Bent is a master of disguise. Her parents are costume designers for the Metropolitan Opera, and Betty always appears in prosthetics, wigs, and costumes. She rarely shows her true face, even though she attends the Girl Scouts weekly. Betty is incredibly shy, sweet and forgiving, rarely clashing with the others' strong personalities. She is very brave. She also makes the costumes, disguises, and uniforms for the group.

When not in costume, Betty is described as a pretty, olive-skinned girl with a black bob haircut. Over the course of the series, she becomes good friends with Ananka Fishbien, and they go shopping together.

Oona Wong

The disgraced daughter of Lester Liu, the leader of the Fu Tsang gang, Oona is an expert hacker and forger. She forges birth certificates, driving licenses and illegal maps and is also known to have a talent for picking locks. She is a very elegant, Chinese, and is described as being very beautiful. She has her own nail studio, the Golden Lotus, which brings in much money. However, she makes even more, often partially illegal money from the salon because the rich clients believe that the salon girls do not understand English. This leads them to discuss important and often money-making deals and pieces of information with their friends, most of which Oona picks up and uses to help her get more money. Oona has a gruff voice that does not match her doll-like appearance, and she is known to be cruel or mean on some occasions.

Iris McLeod

Once an honorary member of the Irregulars, Iris has saved the lives of the main six several times. She is often picked on by Oona, as she is the youngest and smallest of the Irregulars. She is first really introduced at the age eleven, but first appears in the series a seven-year-old. Iris is first mentioned in the series in the first book, as she encounters the Irregulars as they are escaping from the Shadow City. In later books, she becomes an official member. She often assisted DeeDee during experiments and has developed a perfume that makes other people trust the wearer. Her parents travel a lot, and they once brought back a very strong smelling perfume that turns out to keep the rats of the shadow city at bay.
