= The Empress's Tomb =

2007 book by Kirsten Miller

- First edition cover
- Author: Kirsten Miller
- Series: Kiki Strike
- Genre: Young adult novel
- Publisher: Bloomsbury Publishing
- Publication date: October 1, 2007
- ISBN: 978-1-59990-047-6

The Empress's Tomb (2007) is a young adult novel by Kirsten Miller, the second in the Kiki Strike series.

== Plot ==
The preface tells the tale of an empress betrayed by a traitor. It reveals that the runaway princess was not really a traitor and that her loyal servant had hidden the truth inside her coffin.

As the story begins, Ananka is having breakfast with her mother when she reads a newspaper headline: "Is This the Work of Kiki Strike?" The article states that someone has let wild animals loose, all with the sign, "I want to go home." Ananka's mom suspects that Kiki is involved and grills Ananka about her grades.

Later, Ananka comes face-to-face with a 6-foot-tall (1.8 m) squirrel painted on a side of a building holding up a sign that reads, "YOUR MONEY WILL SET ALL THE ANIMALS FREE." Ananka does not think Kiki painted the squirrel, since Kiki could "speak a dozen languages and kick butts twice her size, but couldn't draw a convincing stick figure." Ananka then goes to her meeting place, expecting to see Kiki and finish their map of the Shadow City. After a while she decides to go home, stopping by Kiki's house, which is empty. Everything is perfectly in place except that Verushka's wheelchair is sitting in the middle of the room.

When Kiki Strike doesn't show up for a meeting, Ananka is puzzled. Soon, Betty falls in love, Ananka might be sent to boarding school, Kiki is obviously stressed out and Oona's father seems to want her back to settle his "hungry ghost" problem with her dead mother.

Ananka sniffs a traitor, and then unwillingly falls into the frying pan herself. As they all discover dangerous secrets about themselves, the trust among the Irregulars begins to dissolve. Ananka and her friends must learn to accept their mistakes and forgive one another other to save all of their lives and more. The story ends with a cliffhanger to be resolved in the next book.

== Reception ==
Kirkus Reviews reported that the characters are "sassy, spirited and smart, and their adventures will appeal to young readers cut from the same mold."
