= Charlie McDowell =

American film director and screenwriter (born 1983)

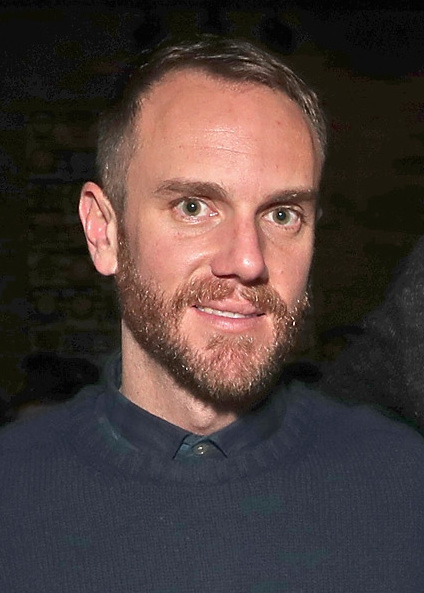
- McDowell at the 2017 Sundance Film Festival
- Born: Charles Malcolm McDowell; July 10, 1983 (age 43); Los Angeles, California, U.S.
- Education: AFI Conservatory
- Occupations: Film director; screenwriter
- Spouse: Lily Collins (m. 2021)
- Children: 1
- Parents: Malcolm McDowell (father); Mary Steenburgen (mother)
- Relatives: Ted Danson (stepfather); Phil Collins (father-in-law); Alexander Siddig (cousin)

Charles Malcolm McDowell (born July 10, 1983) is an American film director and screenwriter. McDowell made his directorial film debut with the romantic thriller The One I Love (2014). He has since written and directed the Netflix drama films The Discovery (2017) and Windfall (2022).

== Early life ==
McDowell was born on July 10, 1983, in Los Angeles, California, to English actor Malcolm McDowell and American actress Mary Steenburgen. He has an older sister named Lilly (born January 22, 1981) and three younger half-brothers from his father's marriage to Kelley Kuhr. His stepfather is actor Ted Danson, who married Steenburgen in 1995.

== Career ==
In 2011, McDowell's Twitter feed, @charliemcdowell, was described by Time as "one of the most hilarious Twitter feeds out there," and in 2013 Three Rivers Press published McDowell's book, Dear Girls Above Me, based on his Twitter feed.

His debut film, The One I Love, starring Mark Duplass and Elisabeth Moss had its world premiere at the Sundance Film Festival in January 2014, where shortly after it was acquired by RADiUS-TWC and released in August 2014. In 2015, McDowell directed Sarah Silverman's untitled HBO series pilot. The project was not picked up by the network. McDowell's next film, The Discovery, starred Rooney Mara, Jason Segel, and Robert Redford. The film premiered at the Sundance Film Festival and was acquired by Netflix for a global release in 2017.

In March 2017, filmmaker McDowell announced he was adapting author Don DeLillo's novel Zero K as a limited series for FX with Noah Hawley and Scott Rudin producing. McDowell previously directed an episode of Hawley's television series Legion, also for FX.

In 2019, McDowell directed the first and last episodes of the Showtime series On Becoming a God in Central Florida and also served as an executive producer. He also directed episodes of Silicon Valley, Dear White People, Tales from the Loop, and Dispatches from Elsewhere.

His next film, Gilded Rage, was based on the infamous murder of investment banker Thomas Gilbert Sr. Bill Skarsgård and Christoph Waltz were set to portray the character in different periods of his life. Lily Collins was also set to star in the film.

== Personal life ==
Since 2014, McDowell has had a running joke at his mother Mary Steenburgen's expense, claiming on numerous occasions on social media that his mother is actually actress Andie MacDowell.

McDowell dated Emilia Clarke from 2018 to 2019. In 2019, McDowell began a relationship with actress Lily Collins, the daughter of English drummer and singer Phil Collins. In September 2020, they announced their engagement. They were married on September 4, 2021, in Dunton Hot Springs, Colorado. In 2025, Collins announced on Instagram that their first child was born via surrogacy.

== Filmography ==
=== Short film ===
| Year | Title | Director | Writer |
|---|---|---|---|
| 2006 | Bye Bye Benjamin | Yes | Yes |

=== Feature film ===
| Year | Title | Director | Producer | Writer |
|---|---|---|---|---|
| 2014 | The One I Love | Yes | Executive | No |
| 2017 | The Discovery | Yes | Yes | Yes |
| 2022 | Windfall | Yes | Yes | Yes |
| 2024 | The Summer Book | Yes | Yes | No |
| 2025 | Lurker | No | Yes | No |

=== Television ===
| Year | Title | Notes |
|---|---|---|
| 2016 | Silicon Valley | 2 episodes |
| 2016 | Untitled Sarah Silverman project | TV pilot |
| 2017-2018 | Dear White People | 2 episodes |
| 2018 | Legion | Episode: "Chapter 15" |
| 2019 | On Becoming a God in Central Florida | 2 episodes, Also executive producer |
| 2020 | Tales from the Loop | Episode: "Parallel" |
| 2020 | Dispatches from Elsewhere | Episode: "The Boy" |

== Awards and nominations ==
| Year | Association | Category | Title | Result |
|---|---|---|---|---|
| 2014 | San Francisco Film Critics Circle | Special Citation | The One I Love | Won |
