= Jason Segel =

American actor, writer (born 1980)

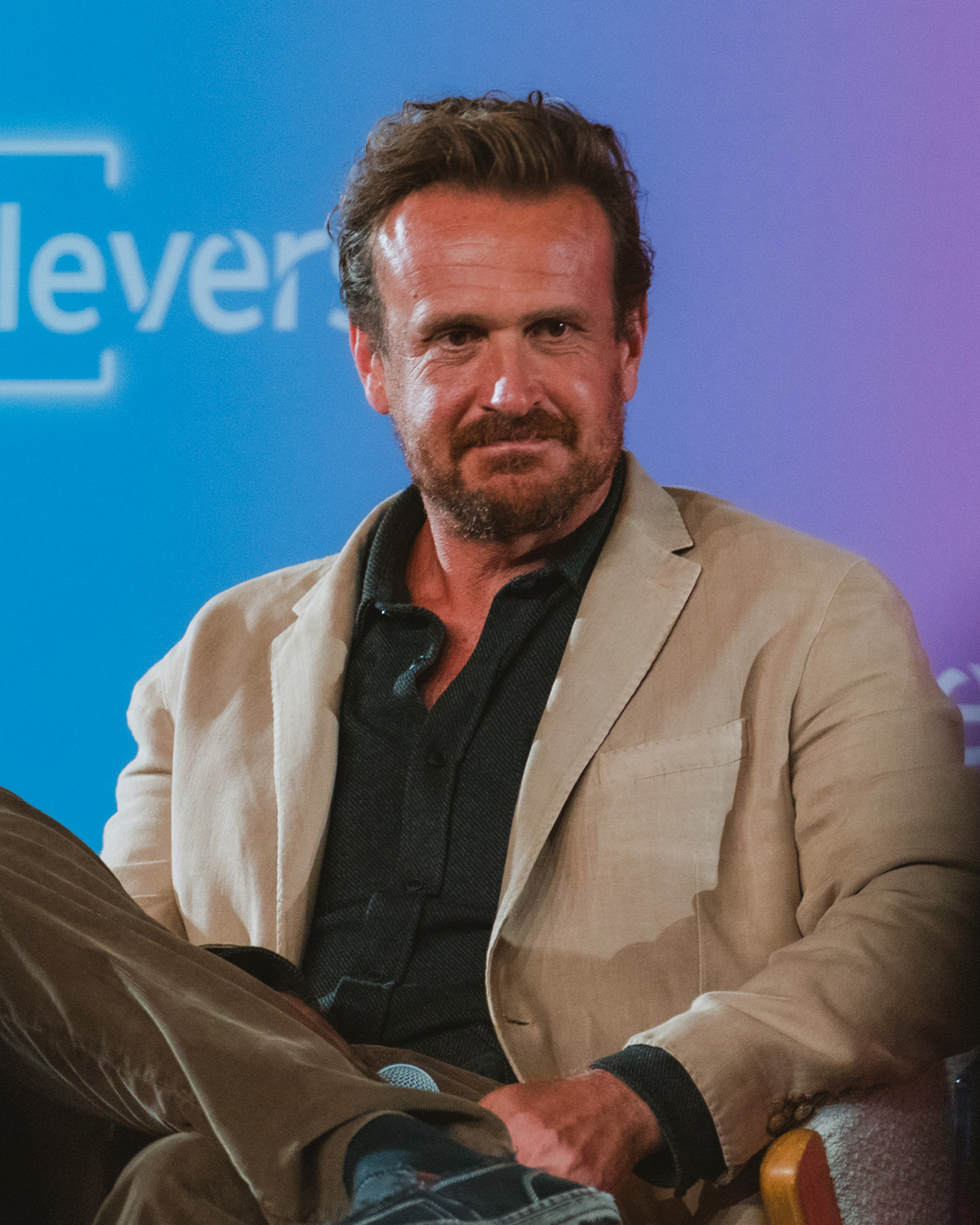
- Segel in 2025
- Born: Jason Jordan Segel; January 18, 1980 (age 46); Santa Monica, California, U.S.
- Occupations: Actor; writer
- Years active: 1998–present
- Height: 1.93 m (6 ft 4 in)
- Spouse: Kayla Radomski (m. 2026)

Jason Jordan Segel (/ˈsiːɡəl/ SEE-gal; born January 18, 1980) is an American actor, comedian, screenwriter, and producer. He is best known for his role as Marshall Eriksen in the CBS sitcom How I Met Your Mother from 2005 to 2014. He began his career with director and producer Judd Apatow on the television series Freaks and Geeks (1999–2000) and Undeclared (2001–2002) before gaining prominence for his leading roles in various successful comedy films which he has starred in, written, and produced.

Segel's comedic films include Knocked Up (2007), Forgetting Sarah Marshall (2008), I Love You, Man (2009), Bad Teacher (2011), The Five-Year Engagement (2012), This Is 40 (2012), and Sex Tape (2014), as well as family films such as Despicable Me (2010), and The Muppets (2011). For his role as David Foster Wallace in The End of the Tour (2015) he received a nomination for the Independent Spirit Award for Best Male Lead. He also starred in the dramas Jeff, Who Lives at Home (2011), The Discovery (2017), Our Friend (2019), and Windfall (2022). From 2022 to 2023, he played the role of Paul Westhead in the HBO series Winning Time: The Rise of the Lakers Dynasty.

In 2023, he began starring as Jimmy Laird, a therapist in the Apple TV series Shrinking, which he also co-created alongside Bill Lawrence and Brett Goldstein. For his performance, he was nominated for two Primetime Emmy Awards and two Golden Globe Awards.

== Early life ==
Segel was born on January 18, 1980, in Santa Monica, California, to Jillian (née Jordan; born 1952) and Alvin Segel, a lawyer. He grew up in the Pacific Palisades neighborhood of Los Angeles. He has an older brother, Adam, and a younger sister, Alison.

Segel's father is Jewish, whereas his mother is of English, Scottish, Irish, and French descent. He has stated that he was raised Jewish, as well as "a little bit of everything". Segel went to Hebrew school and had a Bar Mitzvah ceremony. He also attended St. Matthew's Parish School, a private Episcopal school.

Following elementary school and middle school, Segel completed his high school studies at Harvard-Westlake School in Studio City, where his 6 ft 4 in (1.93 m) frame helped him as an active member of the 1996 and 1997 CIF state champion boys' basketball team. He won a slam dunk contest in high school and he was nicknamed "Dr. Dunk." He was a backup to the team's star center, Jason Collins, who went on to play in the NBA.

== Career ==
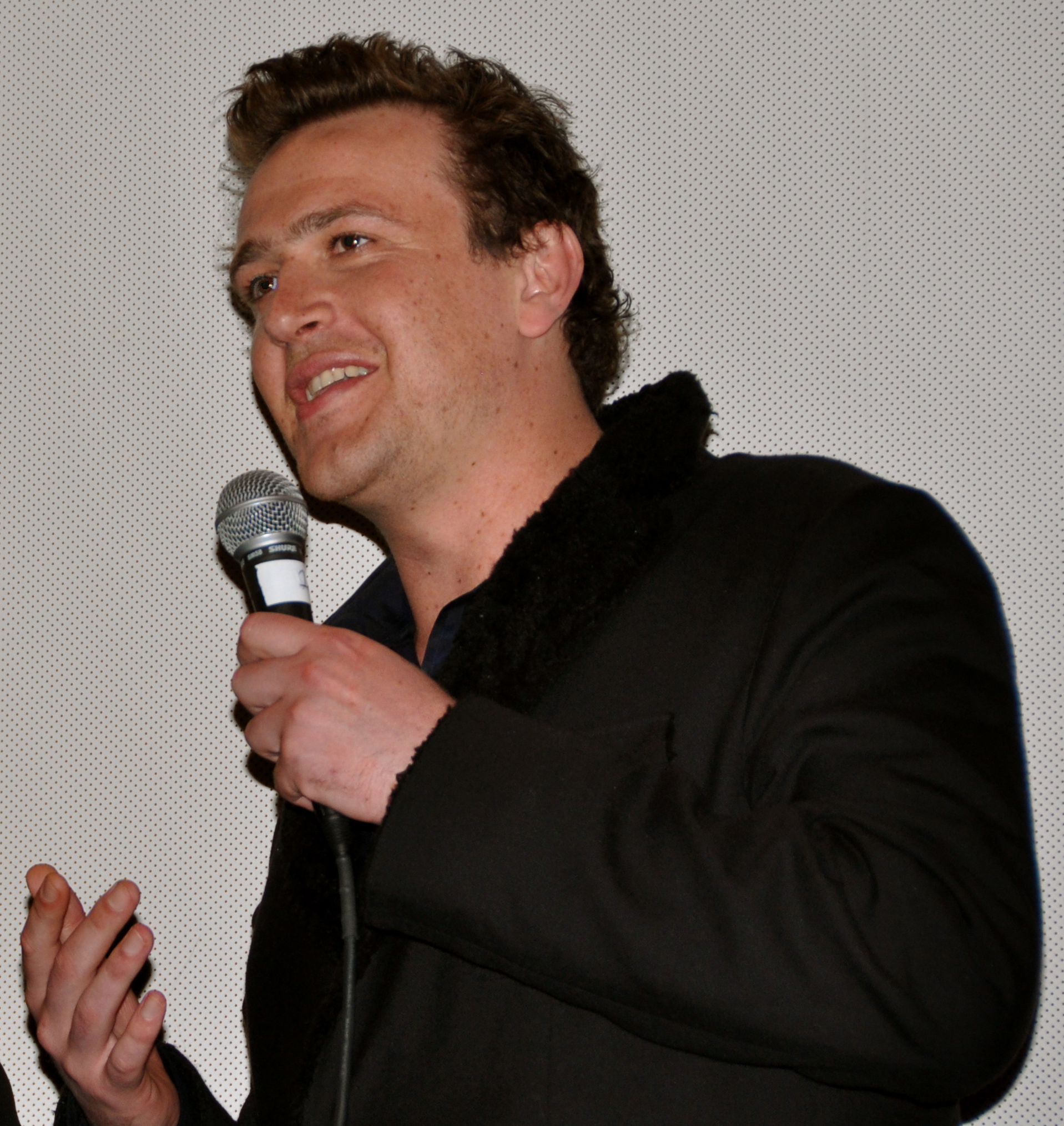
Segel at the Austin premiere of I Love You, Man in 2009

Segel's first major role was as stoner "freak" Nick Andopolis on the 1999 NBC comedy-drama series Freaks and Geeks. Segel personally composed a song for his character, Nick, to sing to the lead female character, Lindsay (Linda Cardellini).

Segel had recurring roles on CSI: Crime Scene Investigation as Neil Jansen and on Undeclared as Eric. He played Marshall Eriksen on the CBS sitcom How I Met Your Mother; he had previously stated he would move on to other projects in 2013 when his contract expired, but was convinced to finish the series after its ninth season in 2014.

Segel made his film debut with Can't Hardly Wait in 1998. His other early feature film appearances include Slackers, SLC Punk!, The Good Humor Man, and Dead Man on Campus. In 2007, he appeared in Knocked Up, directed by Freaks and Geeks producer Judd Apatow. Segel starred in the lead role of 2008's Forgetting Sarah Marshall, a film he wrote and Apatow produced with Shauna Robertson for Universal Pictures. He also starred in I Love You, Man, which was released on March 20, 2009, by DreamWorks.

In Forgetting Sarah Marshall, Segel's character writes a "Dracula" musical performed by puppets. He also appeared in the most prominent scene containing full frontal nudity in the film. In an interview, he stated that the Dracula musical with puppets, as well as being broken up with while naked, were real experiences he wrote into the movie. The film's puppets were custom-made by the Jim Henson Company, and the experience emboldened Segel to pitch his concept for a Muppets movie. Segel performed a song from the film, "Dracula's Lament", on the 1,000th episode of The Late Late Show with Craig Ferguson.

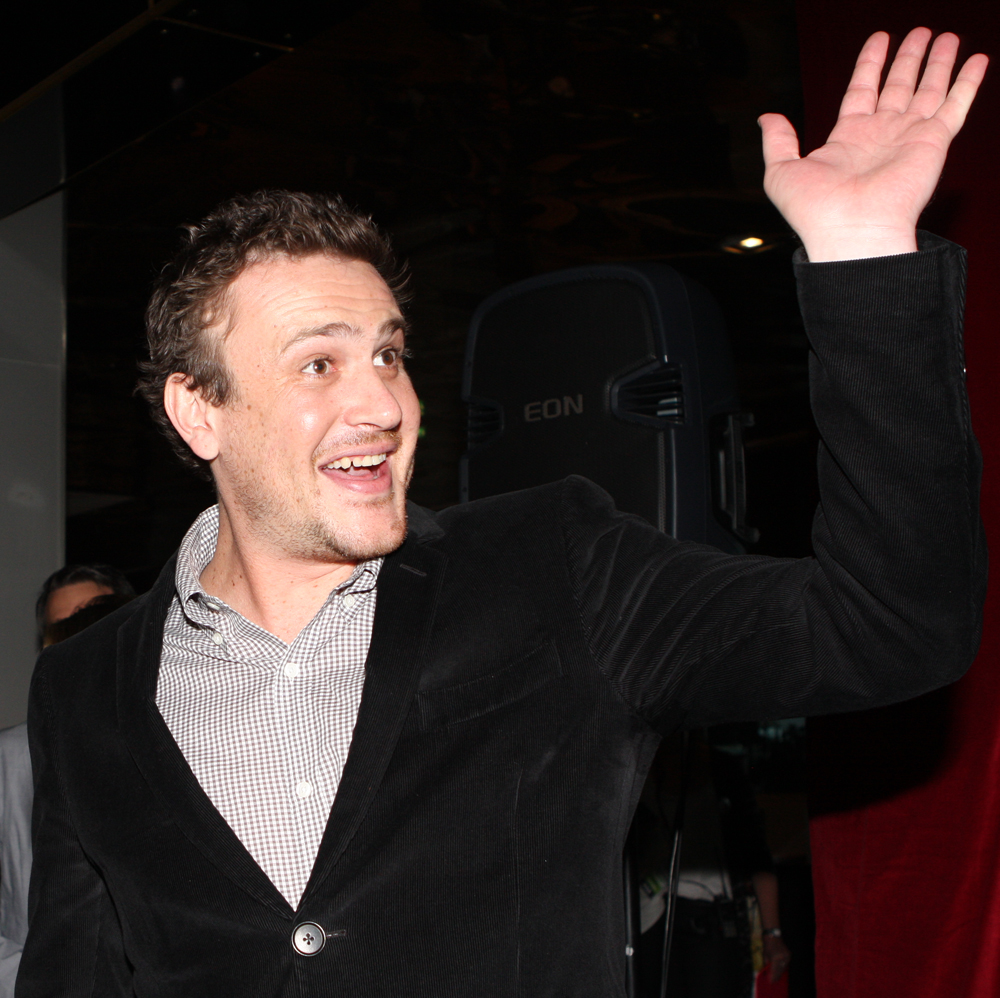
Segel at the Australian premiere of The Muppets in Sydney in 2011

For the 2010 comedy Get Him to the Greek, Segel co-wrote most of the soundtrack's music which was performed by the fictional celebrity singer, Aldous Snow, including Infant Sorrow. He also appeared on The Late Late Show with Craig Ferguson and sang an original song entitled "Wonky Eyed Girl".

In 2010, he voiced Gru's arch-rival Vector in Universal's CGI animated film Despicable Me and appeared as "Horatio" in a fantasy comedy film Gulliver's Travels directed by Rob Letterman and very loosely based on Part One of the 18th-century novel of the same name by Jonathan Swift. Segel appeared in Bad Teacher, starring Cameron Diaz, which opened in June 2011. He played gym teacher and thwarted suitor Russell Gettis. Along with Nicholas Stoller, Segel approached Disney in 2007 to write the latest Muppets film. Disney was unsure on how to take the request, as Segel had just appeared nude in Forgetting Sarah Marshall, but after realizing that he was a fan, the project was approved. Segel stated that he wanted to do the film because the last film in the series to be released in theaters was Muppets from Space in 1999, and he felt that the younger generation was missing out on enjoying one of his childhood favorites.

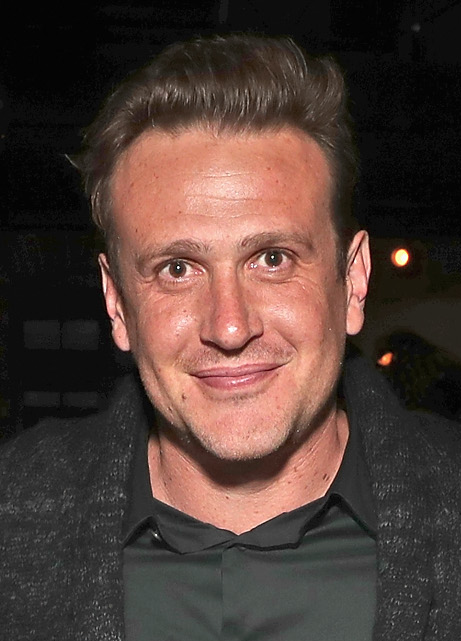
Segel in 2017

Segel decided not to star in the sequel to The Muppets, Muppets Most Wanted. He filmed The Five-Year Engagement with Emily Blunt in the spring of 2011 in Michigan, and the film was released on April 27, 2012.

In 2013, Segel revealed he was working on a series of young adult novels, based on a story he conceived when he was 21. In the fall of 2014, the first novel of the series Nightmares!, co-written with Kirsten Miller, was released with the follow-up coming out the following year.

In 2015, Segel received praise for his portrayal of the late author David Foster Wallace in the independent biographical drama film The End of the Tour. For his performance, he earned an Independent Spirit Award nomination for Best Male Lead.

In 2017, Segel and Miller released a new book, Otherworld , the first of a new young adult series. A second book in the series, OtherEarth, was released in 2018, and a third novel, OtherLife, in 2019. Segel created and starred in the American drama television series Dispatches from Elsewhere, which premiered on March 1, 2020, on AMC.

In 2019, Segel starred in Our Friend based on Matthew Teague's 2015 essay "The Friend".

== Personal life ==
Segel is an ordained minister with the Universal Life Church. He performed a wedding ceremony on The Tonight Show on July 6, 2010, for a couple that solicited his services by placing pictures of him around his hometown and the bar he frequently visited.

Segel dated his Freaks and Geeks co-star Linda Cardellini for several years following the show's cancellation. He dated Michelle Williams from 2012 to 2013. From December 2013 to April 2021, he dated photographer Alexis Mixter.

In 2023, he began dating former Taylor Swift backup dancer Kayla Radomski. In June 2025, Radomski announced their engagement via Instagram. On October 17, 2026, the pair were married at The Huntington Library Botanical Gardens in Pasadena, California in front of family and friends.

== Filmography ==
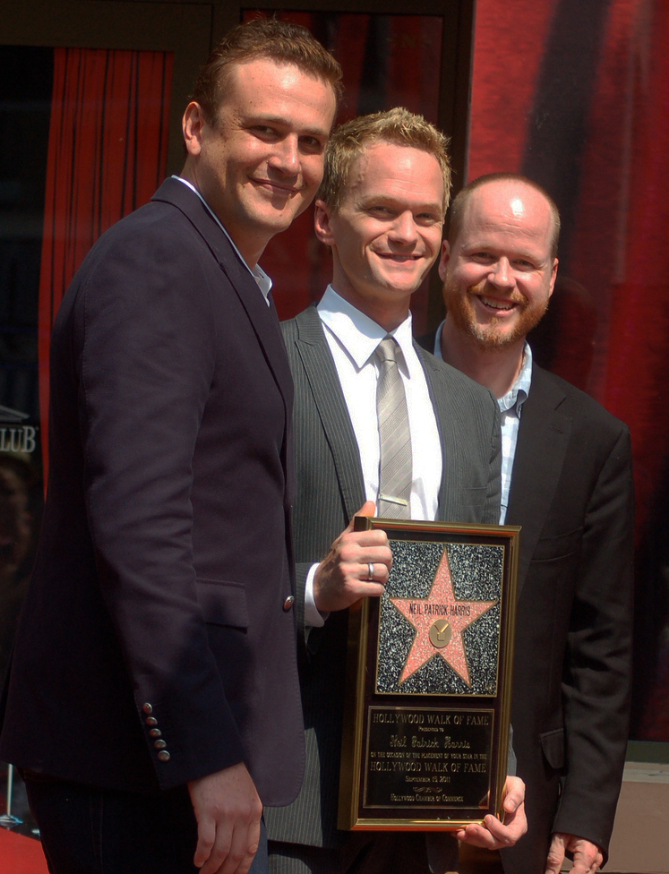
Segel, Neil Patrick Harris and Joss Whedon in 2011

=== Film ===
Year	Title	Role	Notes
1998	Can't Hardly Wait	Matt	
1998	Dead Man on Campus	Kyle	
1998	SLC Punk!	Mike	
2002	Slackers	Sam Schechter	
2003	11:14	Leon (Paramedic #1)	
2003	Certainly Not a Fairytale	Leo	
2004	LolliLove	Jason	
2005	The Good Humor Man	Smelly Bob	
2006	Bye Bye Benjamin	Theodore Everest	
2006	Tenacious D in The Pick of Destiny	Frat Boy	
2007	Knocked Up	Jason	
2008	Forgetting Sarah Marshall	Peter Bretter	Also writer
2009	I Love You, Man	Sydney Fife	
2010	Despicable Me	Victor "Vector" Perkins	Voice role
2010	Gulliver's Travels	Horatio	
2011	Bad Teacher	Russell Gettis	
2011	Friends with Benefits	Brice	Uncredited cameo
2011	Jeff, Who Lives at Home	Jeff Thompkins	
2011	The Muppets	Gary	Also writer and executive producer
2012	The Five-Year Engagement	Tom Solomon	Also writer and executive producer
2012	This Is 40	Jason	
2013	This Is the End	Himself	Uncredited cameo
2014	Sex Tape	Jay Hargrove	Also writer and executive producer
2015	The End of the Tour	David Foster Wallace	
2017	The Discovery	Will Harbor	
2018	Come Sunday	Henry	
2019	Our Friend	Dane Faucheux	
2022	The Sky Is Everywhere	Big Walker	
2022	Windfall	Nobody	Also story writer and producer
2023	Mooned	Victor "Vector" Perkins	Short film, voice role
2024	Despicable Me 4	Victor "Vector" Perkins	Uncredited voice role cameo via archival audio
2026	Over Your Dead Body	Dan	
TBA	Anxious People †	TBA	Post-production
TBA	Sponsor †	Peter	Also writer and producer; filming

=== Television ===
Year	Title	Role	Notes
1999–2000	Freaks and Geeks	Nick Andopolis	Main cast
2001	North Hollywood		Unsold pilot
2001–2002	Undeclared	Eric	Recurring role
2004	Harry Green and Eugene	Eugene Green	Unsold pilot
2004–2005	CSI: Crime Scene Investigation	Neil Jansen	3 episodes
2005	Alias	Sam Hauser	Episode: "The Road Home"
2005–2014	How I Met Your Mother	Marshall Eriksen	Main role; 208 episodes
2009	Family Guy	Marshall Eriksen (voice)	Episode: "Peter's Progress"
2011	Saturday Night Live	Himself (host)	Episode: "Jason Segel/Florence and the Machine"
2020	Dispatches from Elsewhere	Peter	10 episodes; also creator, writer, director, and executive producer
2020	Home Movie: The Princess Bride	Fezzik	Episode: "Chapter Two: The Shrieking Eels"
2022–2023	Winning Time: The Rise of the Lakers Dynasty	Paul Westhead	12 episodes
2023–present	Shrinking	Jimmy Laird	Main cast; also creator, writer, and executive producer

== Awards and nominations ==
Organizations	Year	Category	Work	Result	Ref.
Chicago Film Critics Association	2015	Best Actor	The End of the Tour	Nominated	
Critics' Choice Awards	2011	Critics Choice Award for Best Song	The Muppets	Won	
Golden Globe Awards	2024	Best Actor – Television Series Musical or Comedy	Shrinking	Nominated	
Golden Globe Awards	2025	Best Actor – Television Series Musical or Comedy	Shrinking	Nominated	
Independent Spirit Awards	2015	Best Male Lead	The End of the Tour	Nominated	
MTV Movie Award	2008	Best WTF Moment	Forgetting Sarah Marshall	Nominated	
Primetime Emmy Awards	2023	Outstanding Lead Actor in a Comedy Series	Shrinking (episode: "Imposter Syndrome")	Nominated	
Primetime Emmy Awards	2025	Outstanding Lead Actor in a Comedy Series	Shrinking (for "The Drugs Don't Work")	Nominated	
Primetime Emmy Awards	2026	Outstanding Lead Actor in a Comedy Series	Shrinking (for "The Bodyguard of Sadness")	Nominated	
Razzie Awards	2015	Worst Screen Combo (share with Cameron Diaz)	Sex Tape	Nominated	
Razzie Awards	2015	Worst Screenplay (share with Kate Angelo, Nicholas Stoller)	Sex Tape	Nominated	
Seattle International Film Festival	2015	Best Actor	The End of the Tour	3rd Place	
Screen Actors Guild Awards	2024	Outstanding Ensemble in a Comedy Series	Shrinking (season one)	Nominated	
Teen Choice Award	2008	Choice Movie: Breakout Male	Forgetting Sarah Marshall	Nominated	
Writers Guild of America Awards	2024	Television: New Series	Shrinking	Nominated	
Young Artist Awards	2000	Best Performance in a TV Series: Young Ensemble	Freaks and Geeks	Nominated	
