= Jesse Plemons =

American actor (born 1988)

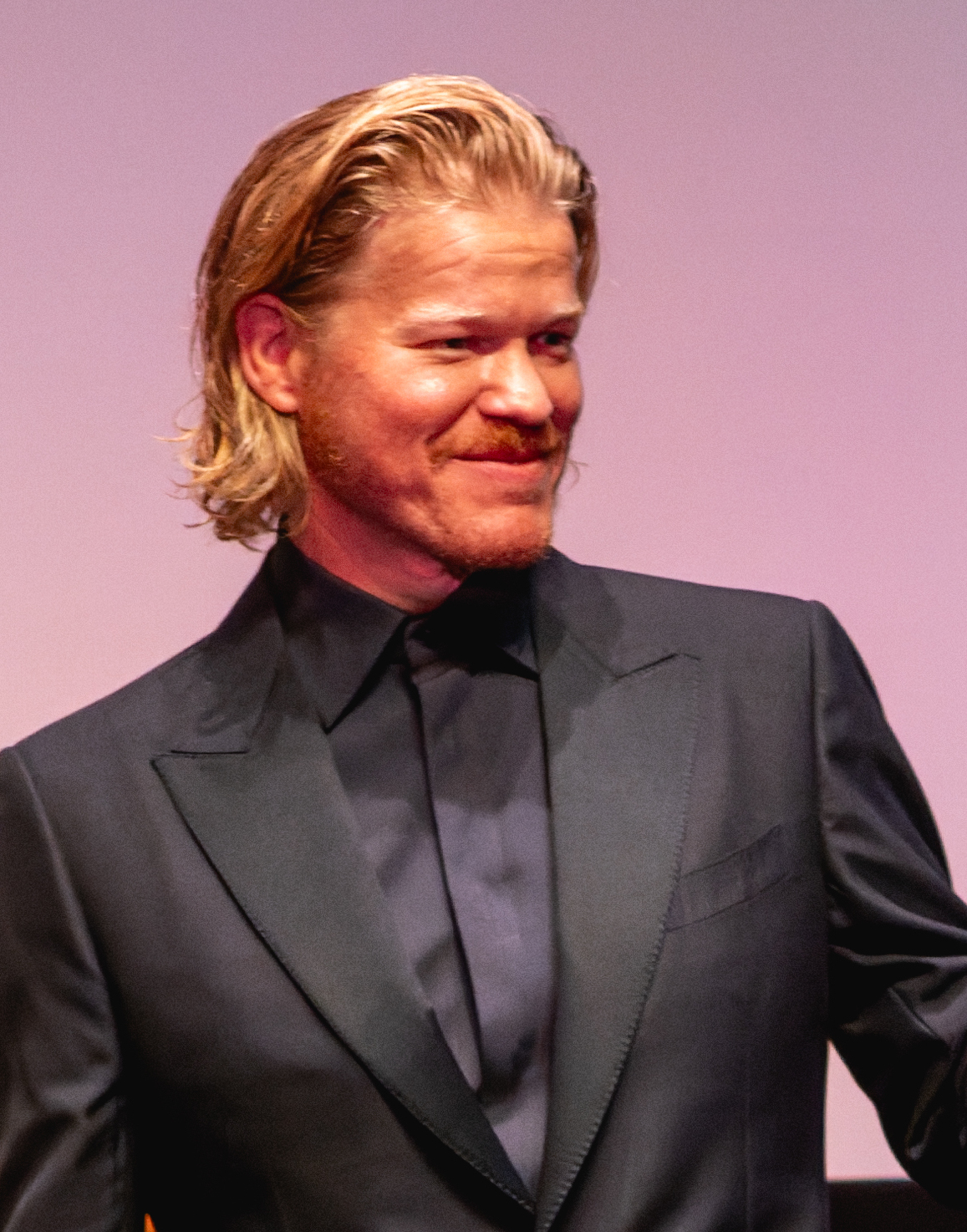
- Plemons in 2025
- Born: April 2, 1988 (age 38); Dallas, Texas, U.S.
- Occupation: Actor
- Years active: 1991–present
- Spouse: Kirsten Dunst (m. 2022)
- Children: 2
- Awards: Full list

Jesse Plemons (/ˈplɛmənz/; born April 2, 1988) is an American actor. Known for his work with auteurs and portrayal of eccentric characters, his accolades include a Cannes Film Festival Award for Best Actor and nominations for an Academy Award, two BAFTAs, two Golden Globes Awards, and three Primetime Emmy Awards.

Plemons began his career as a child actor and had his breakthrough role as Landry Clarke in the NBC drama series Friday Night Lights (2006–2011). He subsequently portrayed Todd Alquist in the fifth and final season of the AMC crime drama series Breaking Bad (2012–2013) and its sequel film El Camino: A Breaking Bad Movie (2019). He received Emmy nominations for his roles as Ed Blumquist in the second season of the FX anthology series Fargo (2015), the Netflix anthology series Black Mirror (2017–2025), and the HBO Max miniseries Love & Death (2023).

Plemons received further recognition with supporting roles in the films Paul (2011), The Master (2012), Bridge of Spies (2015), Game Night (2018), The Irishman (2019), Judas and the Black Messiah (2021), and Killers of the Flower Moon (2023). He played lead roles in Other People (2016), I'm Thinking of Ending Things (2020), Windfall (2022), and Kinds of Kindness (2024). He won the Cannes Film Festival Award for Best Actor for the latter and was nominated for the Academy Award for Best Supporting Actor for playing a rancher in The Power of the Dog (2021). He received BAFTA, Actor Award and Golden Globe nominations for Best Lead Actor for his portrayal of a conspiracy theory–obsessed beekeeper in Bugonia (2025).

Plemons is known for being typecast as quiet and unnerving characters in his most prominent roles, such as Breaking Bad, Black Mirror, and Kinds of Kindness. His acting style is characterized by his Texan accent, cowboy-inspired persona, and dramatic pauses in his speech.

== Early life and education ==
Plemons was born in Dallas, and raised in Mart, Texas, a small town 21 miles (33.7 km) east of Waco. He is the younger of two children to Jim Bob, a firefighter and amateur rodeo competitor, and Lisa (Cason) Plemons, a special education trainer.

In 2007, Plemons graduated from the Texas Tech University Independent School District, a distance learning program, which allowed him to earn his high school diploma. He attended schools in Mart, playing football in middle school, junior high, and at Mart High School, until he received more acting jobs and shifted to the online program.

== Career ==
=== 1991–2006: Early career ===
Plemons got his start in a Coca-Cola commercial at age three. When he was eight, he started doing extra work, and with the support of his family, spent time auditioning in Los Angeles and landing small jobs. After appearing in the films Varsity Blues (1999) and All the Pretty Horses (2000), and guest-starring on Walker, Texas Ranger and Sabrina, the Teenage Witch, Plemons' first prominent role was in the film Children on their Birthdays (2002). He later appeared in Like Mike (2002) and When Zachary Beaver Came to Town (2003), with guest roles on the television series Judging Amy, The Lyon's Den, CSI: Crime Scene Investigation, and Grey's Anatomy between 2003 and 2006.

=== 2006–2011: Breakthrough with Friday Night Lights ===
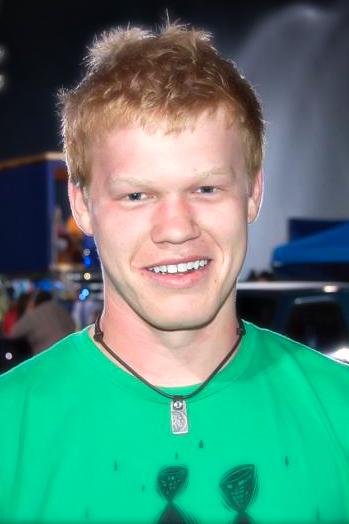
Plemons in 2007

In 2006, when he was 18, Plemons joined the ensemble cast of NBC's television series Friday Night Lights, filmed in Austin, Texas, detailing the fictional events surrounding a high school football team in fictional Dillon, Texas. In the show's first season, his character Landry Clarke provided comic relief as the best friend of football quarterback Matt Saracen, though Landry himself was not on the team. Among the cast and crew, Plemons was said jokingly to have played football better than most of the other actors, though his character was one of the few who did not play.

Landry joined the Panthers football team in the second season, and Plemons, having played high school football, told director Jeffrey Reiner that he would do his own stunts. In his first football scene, Landry had to "get the crap beat out of [him] over and over and over again". When hit by co-star Taylor Kitsch (playing Tim Riggins), Plemons' chin split open, requiring 11 stitches. The show, a fan and critic favorite, ended after five seasons after shifting to DirecTV in 2011.

In 2012, Plemons reunited with Kitsch and Friday Night Lights creator Peter Berg in the film Battleship. Berg, who directed the film, explained that he knew how comfortable Kitsch was with Plemons: "I know that he's really good for Taylor and he makes Taylor better. So, I wrote that whole part for Jesse. I never thought of it as a Friday Night Lights reunion. I thought of it as protection, bringing a trusted family member in."

=== 2011–2019: Character work ===
From 2012 to 2013, Plemons portrayed Todd Alquist during the final season of the AMC drama series Breaking Bad. He was a recurring cast member in Season 5A and was promoted to series regular for Season 5B. Fans of Breaking Bad nicknamed him "Meth Damon", due to Plemons' resemblance to actor Matt Damon. One of his first film roles, at age 12, was playing the younger version of Damon's character in the film All the Pretty Horses (2000).

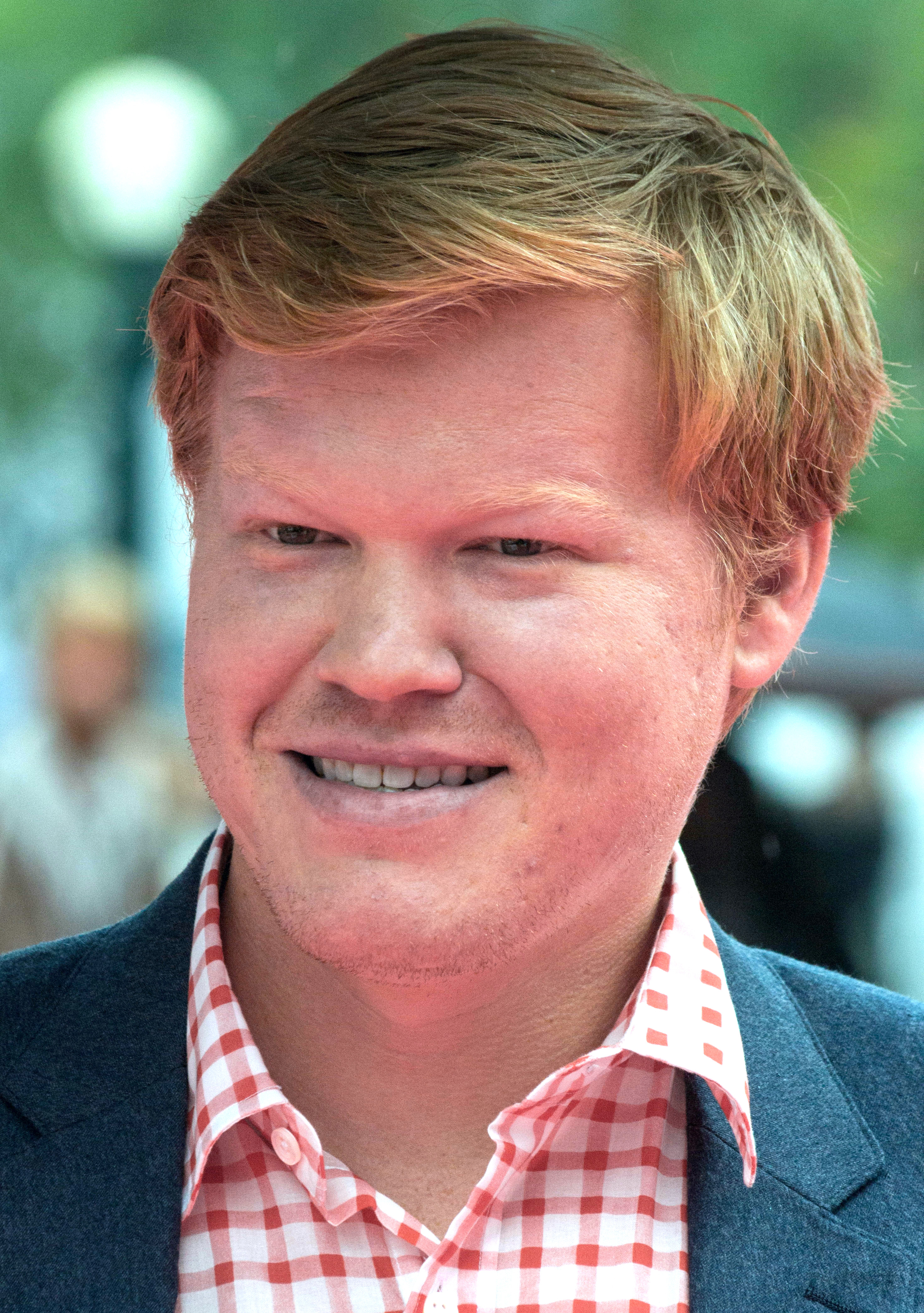
Plemons in 2015

In 2012, Plemons also had a supporting role in the Paul Thomas Anderson drama The Master as the son of Philip Seymour Hoffman's character, an actor to whom his physical appearance has been compared. In January 2014, Plemons was in consideration to be one of the new stars of Star Wars Episode VII (Star Wars: The Force Awakens). In March 2014, Plemons, along with four other actors, were being considered for the lead role of Finn in Episode VII. The role, however, went to British actor John Boyega. Plemons played mobster Kevin Weeks in the Boston-set mob film Black Mass, starring Johnny Depp, which opened in theaters in September 2015. Also that year, he appeared in the Stephen Frears film about Lance Armstrong, The Program, and the Steven Spielberg film Bridge of Spies.

In late-2015, Plemons co-starred in the second season of the TV show Fargo. He portrayed Ed Blumquist, a butcher and the husband of Peggy Blumquist (Kirsten Dunst). For his performance, he was nominated for the Primetime Emmy Award for Outstanding Supporting Actor in a Limited Series or Movie. In 2016, Plemons starred in the film Other People. In 2017, he appeared in the Doug Liman thriller film American Made, the Scott Cooper western Hostiles, and Steven Spielberg's historical drama The Post.

In December 2017, Plemons appeared in "USS Callister", an episode in the fourth series of the anthology show Black Mirror. Plemons played Robert Daly, the episode's main character and a sadistic introvert, and was nominated for the Primetime Emmy Award for Outstanding Lead Actor in a Limited Series or Movie. In 2018, Plemons had supporting roles in two films, the comedy Game Night and Adam McKay's Dick Cheney biopic Vice, which he narrated. In 2019 he had a supporting role in the Martin Scorsese crime drama The Irishman, which premiered at the New York Film Festival on September 27, 2019. He also reprised his role as Todd Alquist in El Camino: A Breaking Bad Movie.

=== 2020–present: Career expansion ===
In 2020, Plemons received critical praise and a Gotham Independent Film Award nomination for Best Actor for his lead performance in Charlie Kaufman's psychological drama I'm Thinking of Ending Things. In 2021, Plemons gave supporting performances in Judas and the Black Messiah, a film about civil rights activist Fred Hampton and the Disney adventure film Jungle Cruise. In the same year, Plemons starred in the supernatural horror film Antlers, again collaborating with director Scott Cooper, and starred once again alongside his real life partner and Fargo co-star Kirsten Dunst in Jane Campion's western drama The Power of the Dog, for which he has received praise and a number of accolades, including a nomination for the Academy Award for Best Supporting Actor.

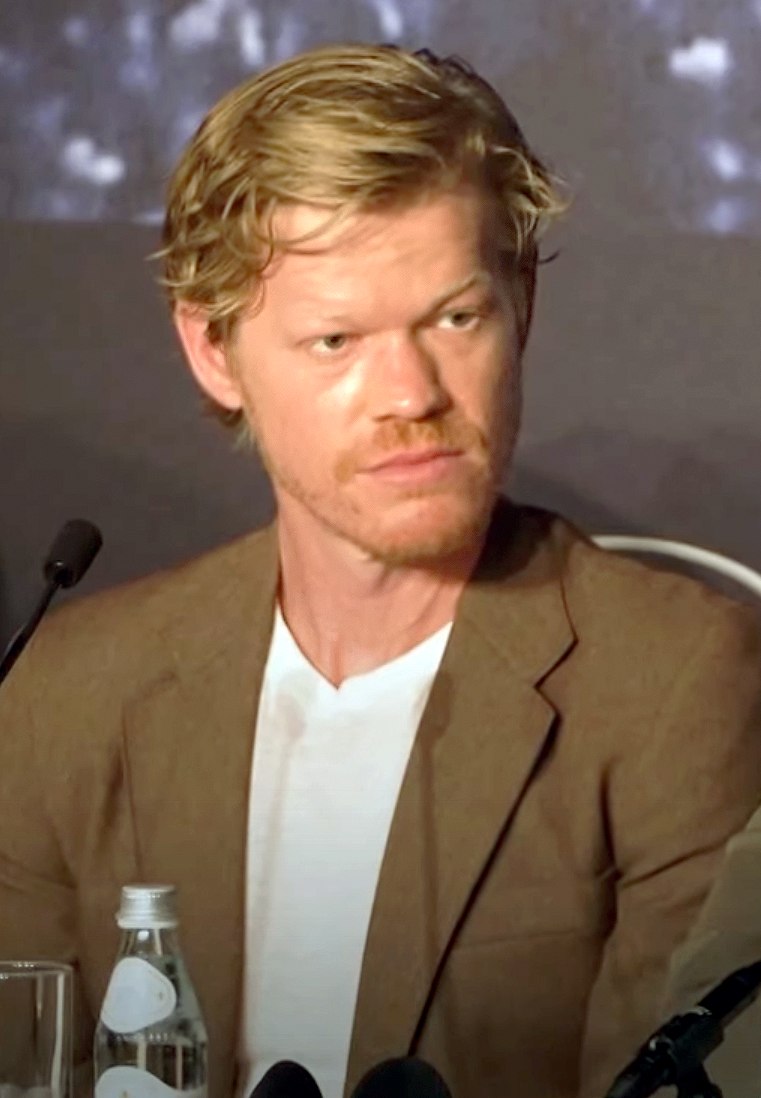
Plemons at the 2024 Cannes Film Festival

In 2022, Plemons starred in Charlie McDowell's noir thriller Windfall, which also marked his first credit as a producer. It was about this time Plemons noted that the number of people referring to him by his nickname "Meth Damon" had started to decline. In 2023, Plemons starred alongside Elizabeth Olsen in the HBO Max true crime series Love & Death and reunited with Martin Scorsese for a supporting role in his western-thriller Killers of the Flower Moon, which he starred in alongside Leonardo DiCaprio, Lily Gladstone and Robert De Niro. The film premiered at the 2023 Cannes Film Festival. In September 2022, Plemons was announced to be starring alongside Emma Stone, Willem Dafoe and Margaret Qualley in Yorgos Lanthimos's film Kinds of Kindness, which premiered at the 2024 Cannes Film Festival, where Plemons won the Best Actor award.

In 2025, Plemons played a supporting role in the Robert De Niro-led Netflix political thriller series Zero Day, which reunited him with Love and Death director Lesli Linka Glatter. He ended the year with a leading role opposite Stone in Lanthimos' black comedy Bugonia. His performance in the latter received critical acclaim. On casting Plemons, Lanthimos said: "He’s very sensitive to all kinds of emotions and triggers. It’s beautiful to see the little things that can make him do something different — a word you tell him, something that changes in the room. He absorbs everything. He allows the situation or the other actor to affect him. That vulnerability and generosity are great qualities for an actor."

In 2024, it was announced Plemons would star alongside Tom Cruise, Sandra Hüller and John Goodman in Alejandro González Iñárritu's Digger. He played Kenny Rockwell, the nephew of the titular Digger Rockwell.

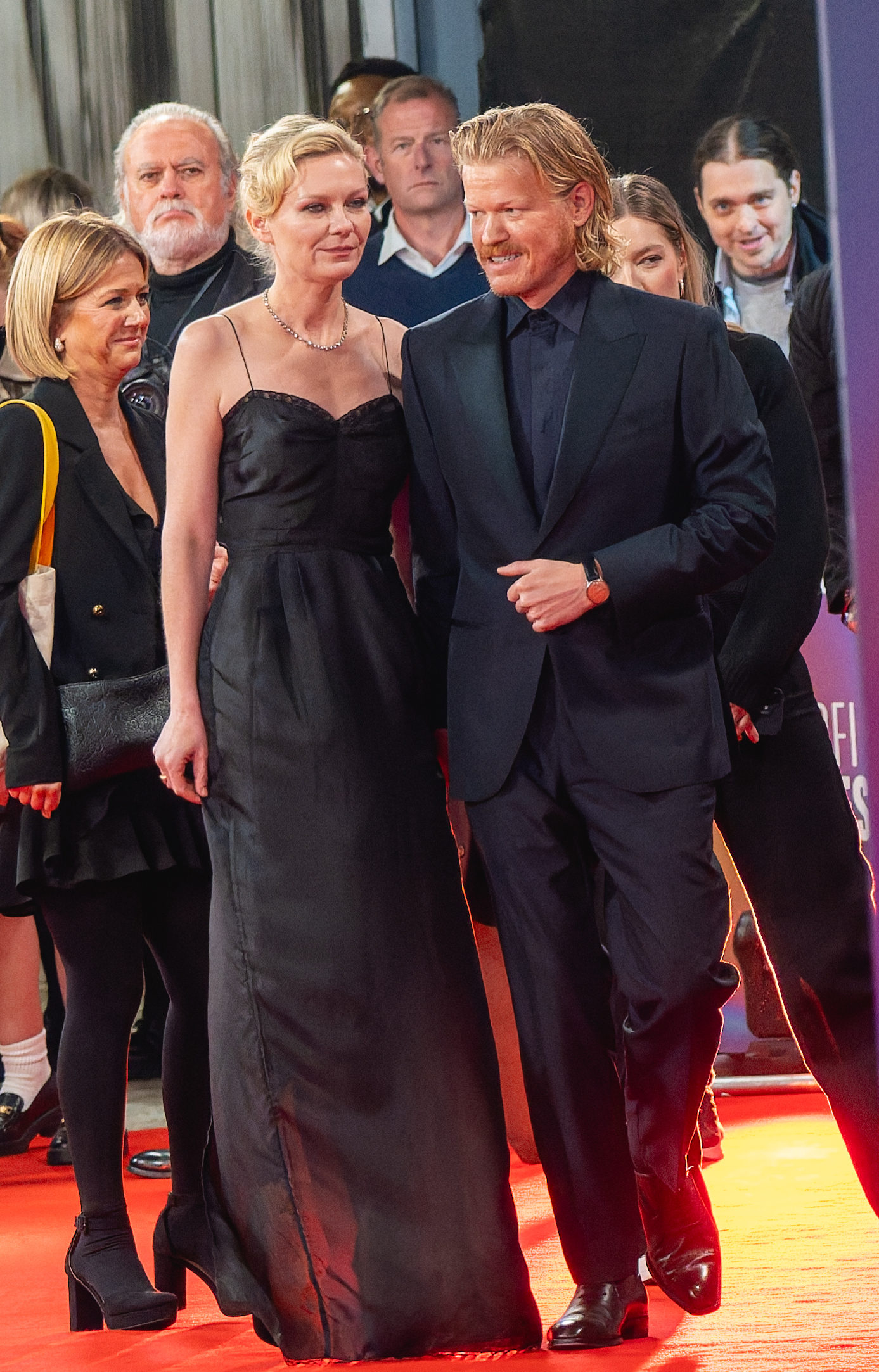
Plemons and wife Kirsten Dunst at the 2025 BFI London Film Festival

==== Upcoming ====
In 2026, Plemons will play Plutarch Heavensbee in The Hunger Games prequel Sunrise on the Reaping, a film adaptation of the bestselling novel of the same name by Suzanne Collins.

== Personal life ==
Plemons began a relationship with his Fargo co-star Kirsten Dunst in March 2016, and the two got engaged a year later. The couple welcomed their first son in May 2018 and their second in May 2021. In February 2022, Plemons and Dunst were both nominated for Academy Awards for their roles in The Power of the Dog. They got married in July of that year. They split their time between the San Fernando Valley in Los Angeles, California and Texas.

== Filmography ==
Key
†	Denotes films that have not yet been released

=== Film ===
Year	Title	Role	Notes
1998	Finding North	Hobo	
1999	Varsity Blues	Tommy Harbor	
2000	All the Pretty Horses	Young John Grady Cole	
2002	Children on Their Birthdays	Preacher Star	
2002	Like Mike	Ox	
2003	When Zachary Beaver Came to Town	Jay	
2003	The Failures	Boe	
2008	The Flyboys	Bully No. 1	
2009	Observe and Report	Charles	
2009	Shrink	Jesus	
2010	Happiness Runs	Chad	
2010	Meeting Spencer	Spencer West	
2011	Paul	Jake	
2012	The Master	Val Dodd	
2012	Battleship	Jimmy "Ordy" Ord	
2014	The Homesman	Garn Sours	
2014	Flutter	David	
2015	Black Mass	Kevin Weeks	
2015	The Program	Floyd Landis	
2015	Bridge of Spies	Joe Murphy	
2016	Other People	David Mulcahey	
2017	The Discovery	Toby Harbor	
2017	American Made	Sheriff Joe Downing	
2017	Hostiles	Lieutenant Rudy Kidder	
2017	The Post	Roger Clark	
2018	Game Night	Gary Kingsbury	
2018	Vice	Kurt	
2019	The Irishman	Chuckie O'Brien	
2019	El Camino: A Breaking Bad Movie	Todd Alquist	
2020	Snow Globe: A Breaking Bad Short	Todd Alquist	Short film
2020	I'm Thinking of Ending Things	Jake	
2021	Judas and the Black Messiah	Roy Mitchell	
2021	Jungle Cruise	Prince Joachim	
2021	The Power of the Dog	George Burbank	
2021	Antlers	Sheriff Paul Meadows	
2022	Windfall	CEO	Also producer
2023	Killers of the Flower Moon	Tom White	
2024	Civil War	Militiaman	Uncredited cameo
2024	Kinds of Kindness	Robert, Daniel and Andrew	Triple role
2025	Bugonia	Teddy Gatz	
2026	Digger	Kenny Rockwell	
2026	The Hunger Games: Sunrise on the Reaping	Plutarch Heavensbee	

=== Television ===
Year	Title	Role	Notes
2000	Walker, Texas Ranger	Russell, Jr.	Episode: "The General's Return"
2001	The Guardian	Lawrence Neal	Episode: "Paternity"
2001	Sabrina, the Teenage Witch	Bigger Kid	Episode: "Really Big Season Opener"
2003	The Lyon's Den	Ray Ferris	Episode: "The Other Side of Caution"
2003	Judging Amy	James Franklin	Episode: "Marry, Marry Quite Contrary"
2004	Huff	Dawson James	Episode: "Cold Day in Shanghai"
2004	CSI: Crime Scene Investigation	Owen Durbin	Episode: "Down the Drain"
2006	Grey's Anatomy	Jake Burton	Episode: "Yesterday"
2006	NCIS	Jason Geckler	Episode: "Deception"
2006–2011	Friday Night Lights	Landry Clarke	59 episodes
2008	Fear Itself	Lemmon	Episode: "The Sacrifice"
2009	Cold Case	Ryan Stewart	Episode: "Into the Blue/The Long Blue Line"
2011	Childrens Hospital	Jesse	Episode: "Father's Day"
2012	Bent	Gary	6 episodes
2012–2013	Breaking Bad	Todd Alquist	13 episodes
2014, 2016, 2018	Drunk History	Various roles	3 episodes
2014	Olive Kitteridge	Jerry McCarthy	Miniseries, 2 episodes
2015	Fargo	Ed Blumquist	10 episodes
2017	No Activity	Angus	8 episodes
2017, 2025	Black Mirror	Captain Robert Daly	Episode: "USS Callister" & "USS Callister: Into Infinity"
2023	Love & Death	Allan Gore	Miniseries, 7 episodes
2025	Zero Day	Roger Carlson	Miniseries, 5 episodes
