= Ed Blumquist =

Fargo character

- Fargo character
- First appearance: "Waiting for Dutch" (2015)
- Last appearance: "Palindrome" (2015)
- Created by: Noah Hawley
- Portrayed by: Jesse Plemons

In-universe information
- Occupation: Butcher
- Spouse: Peggy Blumquist

Ed Blumquist is a fictional character and one of the lead protagonists from second season of the FX produced television series, Fargo. He is created by Noah Hawley and portrayed by Jesse Plemons, who was nominated for the Primetime Emmy Award for Outstanding Supporting Actor in a Limited Series or Movie for this role.

== Character overview ==
Ed is a butcher and devoted husband to highschool sweetheart Peggy Blumquist. The couple live in Ed's parents' house in Luverne, Minnesota. Ed is perfectly content with their life and has plans to buy the butcher shop from his boss and start a family. Peggy, however, is unhappy with their life and feels that it is mundane. These feelings drive her towards psychosis which she displays subtly.

Despite this, and all of the issues caused by Peggy's accident, Ed never wavers in his love and support for his wife, going along with her often problematic ideas.

Ed's name seems to be based on Todd Alquist, Plemons' previous role in Breaking Bad.

== Storyline ==
On a fateful day in 1979, Ed returns home to his wife making dinner and a noise coming from the garage. He discovers the car's windshield is cracked, and his wife Peggy tells him that she hit a deer on the way home. He then finds a badly injured man, Rye Gerhardt, in the garage. Rye is delirious and attacks him, leading Ed to kill Rye in self-defense. At this point, Ed gains the first insight into his wife's mental issues. He asks her why, after she accidentally hit Rye with her car, had she "brought him home, made dinner Hamburger Helper?" and pretended everything was normal instead of reporting the incident. Without a sufficient answer, he continues to fulfill the role of the faithful husband and the two begin to plan a cover-up for the accident and disposal of the body.

At Peggy's suggestion, they decide to crash the car to explain the damage and Ed disposes of the body after hours at the butcher shop. Sheriff Deputy Lou Solverson walks in on the body grinding process, finding Ed's nervousness strange but not realising what's occurring. When Lou pieces the events together, he questions Peggy and Ed and informs them that Rye is a member of the Gerhardt family- the most powerful crime syndicate in Fargo, North Dakota. They deny having anything to do with Rye's death and stick to their story, at Peggy's insistence, despite Lou's offer of police protection. Following this conversation, Peggy tries to get Ed to leave town and move to California with her, but Ed refuses to uproot the life that he has worked so hard for.

Ed is informed that the butcher shop is going to be sold to someone else if he doesn't have enough money by the end of the week. Meanwhile, Gerhardt matriarch Floyd wishes to avenge her son and wants "the butcher" dead. Soon after, Ed is attacked by two members of the Gerhardt syndicate in the shop. He kills one of them with his butcher's cleaver, and the other one, Charlie Gerhardt, is hit by a ricocheted bullet and badly injured. During the fight, the butcher shop was set on fire. Ed tries to leave the shop with the owner's daughter, Noreen, but she tells him to take Charlie out to safety. After making sure Noreen can recount how he saved Charlie and killed the other man in self-defence to the police, Ed rushes home to Peggy. There Peggy informs him that she has sold her car so they can pay for the shop and stay in Luverne. Ed tells her what happened and that there is no more shop. They know they will soon be pursued by the Gerhardts and the police, and opt to make a run for it.

Before they can flee, they are confronted by the police. Dodd Gerhardt, Rye's brother, interceded before the police take any action. A skirmish ensues resulting in the incapacitation of the present police officers. Peggy is approached by Dodd but she manages to subdue him and takes him captive. Ed seizes this opportunity and devises a plan to trade him for their freedom. Ed and Peggy take refuge in a remote hunting cabin with their captive. After some failed negotiations with the Gerhardts, they set to meet a rival crime family from Kansas City to trade Dodd for a promise of protection and elimination of the Gerhardts. Before the meeting, Ed returns to find Dodd has escaped his binding, and Peggy is lying on the ground, injured. Dodd attacks him and hangs him nearly to death before Peggy manages to save him. Dodd turns towards them again to kill them, but Hanzee, a Gerhardt who was sent to save Dodd but went rogue bursts in and kills him. The police arrive immediately after and Peggy stabs Hanzee in the back as he escapes. The police take the couple into custody.

The couple are offered a deal by the South Dakota State Police where they receive reduced jail time and protective custody in their imminent trial. In exchange, Ed must follow through with the Kansas City meeting and wear a wire. While the police are holding the Blumquists in protection at the hotel, the Gerhardts attack, mistakenly thinking that Dodd is being held there. During the shootout, Ed and Peggy escape and Ed sees a UFO while they are running. Hanzee pursues them and shoots Ed. They keep running and lock themselves in a grocery store's cooler room. Ed sits in anguish and tells Peggy that he can see her problems clearly now and that their relationship is over, even though he still loves her and the idea of their life together. He then succumbs to his wound.

== Production ==
Ed's character (Plemons) and Peggy (Dunst) were the first two characters to be cast for the season, with the announcement made in December 2014.

Plemons had to style his appearance in many ways to fit showrunner Noah Hawley's image. He had already gained weight for his role in the film Black Mass, and he was instructed to keep it on against his wishes for Ed's character. The middle hair part that is an iconic element of Ed's appearance was also conceptualized by Hawley. He has since married his costar, Kirsten Dunst.

== Reception ==
Plemons' performance as Ed Blumquist was widely appreciated by audience and critics alike. Plemons won the Critics' Choice Television Award for Best Supporting Actor in a Movie/Miniseries.

Plemons was additionally nominated for a Primetime Emmy Award in the category of Outstanding Supporting Actor in a Limited Series or Movie for 2016-2017 which was awarded to Sterling K. Brown for his role in FX's The People v. O. J. Simpson: American Crime Story.
