= Keir O'Donnell =

Australian actor

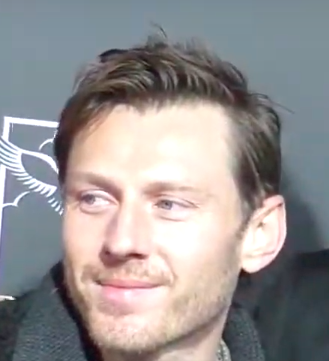
- Keir O'Donnell in 2016
- Occupation: Actor
- Years active: 2002–present

Keir O'Donnell is an Australian actor, best known for his roles in the films Wedding Crashers (2005), The Break-Up (2006), Paul Blart: Mall Cop (2009) and American Sniper (2014), as well as numerous television appearances.

== Early life ==
O'Donnell attended high school at The Bromfield School, and was involved in numerous productions both on the festival circuit and in community theater. In 1996, he was awarded a Massachusetts High School Drama Guild Acting Scholarship. Upon graduation he joined the first class of the newly created four-year classical theatre acting conservatory at The Hartt School in Hartford, Connecticut. The Hartt School of Theatre was established by Malcolm Morrison and Alan Rust (North Carolina School of the Arts). At the Hartt School he performed in numerous plays including Three Sisters, Lysistrata, Twelfth Night, Philadelphia Here I Come, and played Romeo in Romeo and Juliet opposite Hannah Mello. He graduated in 2000 and was accepted to the Hartford Stage Co. Regional Theatre, where he appeared in Macbeth and A Christmas Carol. In the fall of 2001 he was cast as a lead in the U.S. premiere of The Man Who Never Yet Saw Woman's Nakedness by Moritz Rinke, at The Odyssey Theatre in West Los Angeles.

== Feature films ==
After several student and independent films, O'Donnell landed the role of Todd Cleary in Wedding Crashers. The film went on to become the highest grossing R-rated comedy of all time. Not long after Crashers, Vince Vaughn invited O'Donnell to join him on the road for his Wild West Comedy Tour, a tour that hit 30 cities in 30 days across the country. O'Donnell would appear on stage with Vaughn as a special guest doing improv skits. The tour was filmed and can be seen as the documentary: Vince Vaughn's Wild West Comedy Show.

In 2002, he played the role of Todd Jarvis in the movie Splat!, a troubled teen who played paintball to help him succeed. O'Donnell re-teamed with Vaughn for The Break-Up. O'Donnell costarred in the indie comedy Flakes with Zooey Deschanel, which premiered at the 2007 South By Southwest Film Festival. O'Donnell also appeared in Henry Bean's film Noise, which was featured at the 2008 Toronto Film Festival. He appeared as the villain Veck Simms in Paul Blart: Mall Cop and appeared in the 2010 romantic comedy, When in Rome, with Kristen Bell and Josh Duhamel. The same year he had a cameo in The Mother of Invention.

O'Donnell had his directorial debut in 2024, with Marmalade.

== Television work ==
O'Donnell made guest appearances on Lost, CSI, The Closer, and United States of Tara. He made several appearances on the first season of the FX series Sons of Anarchy. He appeared in an episode of It's Always Sunny in Philadelphia, which aired on 2 October 2008. He was part of the ensemble cast of the short-lived ABC documentary-style dramedy, My Generation (2010), developed by Noah Hawley, and later had recurring roles on Hawley's other series Fargo and Legion. In 2011, he had a recurring role on the Showtime series United States of Tara, appearing for the second half of the third season as Evan, Kate's love interest. In 2013, he made a guest appearance on NCIS playing Ramsey Boone.

== Filmography ==
=== Film ===
Year	Title	Role	Notes
2002	In Your Face	Todd Jarvis	
2004	Starkweather	Bob Von Buch	
2005	Wedding Crashers	Todd Cleary	
2006	The Break-Up	Paul Grant	
2007	Flakes	Stuart	
2007	What We Do Is Secret	Chris Ashford	
2007	After Sex	David	
2007	Deadbox	Tucker	
2008	Bar Starz	Dick	
2008	Pathology	Ben Stravinsky	
2008	Amusement	The Laugh	
2009	Paul Blart: Mall Cop	Veck Simms	
2009	Taking Chances	Digger Morris	
2009	The Mother of Invention	Tears of a Child Villain	
2010	The Runaways	Rodney Bingenheimer	
2010	When in Rome	Father Dino	
2010	Miss Nobody	L.J. Feffer	
2012	Free Samples	Danny	
2012	Complacent	Thomas Pulchek	
2013	Worm	Dustin (voice)	
2013	A Case of You	Eliot	Also writer & producer
2014	Dawn of the Planet of the Apes	Finney	
2014	American Sniper	Jeff Kyle	
2015	Return to Sender	Tony Desantos	
2016	Incarnate	Oliver	
2017	Gifted	Bradley Pollard	
2017	Heart, Baby	Randy	
2020	The Dry	Greg Raco	
2022	Ambulance	FBI Agent Anson Clark	
2024	Marmalade	—N/a	Writer & director
2025	Coyotes	Exterminator	

=== Television ===
Year	Title	Role	Notes
2004	8 Simple Rules	Derek	Episode: "Mall in the Family"
2004	Lost	Thomas	Episode: "Raised by Another"
2005	Killer Instinct	Chester	Episode: "Shake, Rattle, and Roll"
2006	CSI: Crime Scene Investigation	Ken Richmond	Episode: "Up in Smoke"
2006	The Closer	Gerald Curtis	Episode: "No Good Deed"
2006	Introducing Lennie Rose	Harper	TV film
2007	It's a Mall World	Dennis	TV miniseries
2008	It's Always Sunny in Philadelphia	Jan	Episode: "Mac and Charlie Die: Part 2"
2008	Sons of Anarchy	Lowell Harland Jr.	Recurring role
2009	FlashForward	Ned Ned	Episode: "Black Swan"
2010	Ghosts/Aliens	Mike Stevens	TV film
2010	My Generation	Kenneth Finley	Main role
2011	United States of Tara	Evan	Recurring role
2012	The Tin Star	Daniel Flynn	TV film
2012	Law & Order: Special Victims Unit	Stuart	Episode: "Street Revenge"
2013	NCIS	Ramsey Boone	Episode: "Prime Suspect"
2013	Californication	Beckett Fetch	Episode: "Blind Faith"
2013	Maron	Matt	Episode: "Mexican Angel"
2014	Rizzoli & Isles	Craig Johnson	Episode: "Tears of a Clown"
2015	Masters of Sex	Vincent	Episode: "Two Scents"
2015	Fargo	Ben Schmidt	Recurring role
2016	The Crossroads of History	Niccolò Machiavelli / John Wilkes Booth	Episodes: "Mona Lisa" & "Lincoln"
2017	Sun Records	Dewey Phillips	TV series
2017–2018	Ray Donovan	George Winslow	Recurring (season 5)
2017–2019	Legion	Daniel	3 episodes
2018	Drunk History	Mullen	Episode: "Death"
2019	Into the Dark	Larry Adams	Episode: "I'm Just F*cking With You"
2020	Project Blue Book	Evan Blake	4 episodes
2023	High Desert	Stewart	2 episodes
2024	FBI: Most Wanted	William Barlowe	Episode: "Powderfinger"
2024	Mayor of Kingstown	Macon	Episode: "Rag Doll"
