= Lucy in the Sky =

2019 film directed by Noah Hawley

- Theatrical release poster
- Directed by: Noah Hawley
- Screenplay by: Brian C. Brown; Elliott DiGuiseppi; Noah Hawley
- Story by: Brian C. Brown; Elliott DiGuiseppi
- Produced by: Reese Witherspoon; Bruna Papandrea; Noah Hawley; John Cameron
- Starring: Natalie Portman; Jon Hamm; Zazie Beetz; Dan Stevens; Colman Domingo; Ellen Burstyn
- Cinematography: Polly Morgan
- Edited by: James Haygood
- Music by: Alexandre Desplat
- Production companies: Fox Searchlight Pictures; Pacific Standard; 26 Keys Productions
- Distributed by: Fox Searchlight Pictures
- Release dates: September 11, 2019 (TIFF); October 4, 2019 (United States)
- Running time: 125 minutes
- Country: United States
- Language: English
- Box office: $481,707

Lucy in the Sky is a 2019 American psychological drama film directed by Noah Hawley in his feature directorial debut, and co-written by Hawley, Brian C. Brown, and Elliott DiGuiseppi. The film stars Natalie Portman as astronaut Lucy Cola, loosely based on the life of real-life NASA astronaut Lisa Nowak. Alongside Portman, the cast includes Jon Hamm, Zazie Beetz, Dan Stevens, Colman Domingo, and Ellen Burstyn in supporting roles.

The plot follows Lucy Cola as she returns to Earth after a transcendent experience in space, only to find herself losing touch with reality as her life unravels. Struggling to readjust to life on Earth, Lucy embarks on a dangerous emotional and psychological journey that tests her grip on sanity.

Lucy in the Sky premiered at the 44th Toronto International Film Festival on September 11, 2019, before its theatrical release in the United States on October 4, 2019, by Fox Searchlight Pictures. The film received negative reviews from critics and grossed $481,707 worldwide.

== Plot ==
Astronaut Lucy Cola is profoundly affected by her first mission in space, an experience that leaves her feeling disconnected from life on Earth. Upon returning, she struggles to reintegrate into her everyday routine with her supportive husband and niece. Although advised to undergo therapy and rest by NASA, Lucy becomes increasingly determined to return to space as soon as possible. She immerses herself in physical and mental training, pushing herself beyond limits in an effort to qualify for the next mission.

During her training, Lucy befriends Mark Goodwin, a fellow astronaut with whom she begins an extramarital affair, further distancing herself from her husband. She also meets Erin Eccles, a younger astronaut who recently set a new record, intensifying Lucy's competitive drive. As Lucy grows closer to Mark, she discovers that he is also romantically involved with Erin, which adds to her growing feelings of betrayal and isolation. When her grandmother dies of a stroke, Lucy's emotional stability deteriorates further, and her increasingly erratic behavior begins to worry those around her, including her husband.

Despite her efforts, Lucy is informed by the NASA administration that she has been passed over for the upcoming space mission due to her erratic behavior, including a near-drowning incident during training and her failure to attend required therapy sessions. Instead of accepting the decision, Lucy becomes paranoid, suspecting ulterior motives, particularly when she finds that Erin has been selected for the mission. She becomes fixated on the idea that Mark, who had urged NASA to pass her over, is conspiring against her.

Lucy's psychological state deteriorates as she embarks on a cross-country road trip with her teenage niece, planning to confront Mark and Erin. During the journey, Lucy experiences hallucinations and leaves troubling messages for NASA. She ultimately tracks down Mark at an airport, where she confronts him, armed with a variety of weapons. Her attempt to seek revenge is thwarted when the police apprehend her, finding an array of disturbing items in her car.

Three years later, Lucy's life has taken a different path. She now works as a beekeeper, tending to hives with a sense of peace. Her niece, now in school, gives a class presentation, watched by Lucy's estranged husband. In a quiet, reflective moment, Lucy opens the hood of her protective suit and gazes at the bees and a butterfly, hinting at a fragile sense of acceptance and closure.

== Cast ==
- Natalie Portman as Lucy Cola
- Jon Hamm as Mark Goodwin
- Zazie Beetz as Erin Eccles
- Dan Stevens as Drew Cola
- Colman Domingo as Frank Paxton
- Ellen Burstyn as Nana Holbrook
- Pearl Amanda Dickson as Blue Iris
- Jeremiah Birkett as Hank Lynch
- Joe Williamson as Mayer Hines
- Nick Offerman as Dr. Will Plimpton
- Tig Notaro as Kate Mounier
- Jeffrey Donovan as Jim Hunt

== Production ==
In February 2017, Noah Hawley was brought on board to produce a film then titled Pale Blue Dot, alongside Bruna Papandrea and Reese Witherspoon, with Witherspoon initially set to star in the lead role. However, in November 2017, Witherspoon exited the project to film the second season of Big Little Lies.

By January 2018, Hawley had also taken on the role of director, marking his feature film directorial debut, while Natalie Portman entered negotiations to replace Witherspoon in the lead role. The film's title was later changed to Lucy in the Sky, inspired by the Beatles song "Lucy in the Sky with Diamonds".

In March 2018, Jon Hamm joined the cast, followed by Zazie Beetz in April and Dan Stevens in May. In June 2018, Ellen Burstyn was cast to portray the grandmother of Portman's character. The cast continued to expand with the additions of Colman Domingo and Jeremiah Birkett in July 2018. In February 2019, it was announced that Nick Offerman had also joined the cast.

== Release and reception ==
Lucy in the Sky had its world premiere at the 2019 Toronto International Film Festival on September 11, 2019. The film was subsequently released in theaters on October 4, 2019, by Fox Searchlight Pictures.

=== Box office ===
Lucy in the Sky grossed $55,000 from 37 theaters during its opening weekend, a performance that was widely described as "terrible".

=== Critical response ===
Lucy in the Sky received negative reviews from critics, who criticized its pacing, writing, and lack of character development; however, praise was directed at Natalie Portman's performance.

On the review aggregator website Rotten Tomatoes, Lucy in the Sky holds an approval rating of 21% based on 127 reviews, with an average score of 4.4/10. The site's critics' consensus reads: "Portman gives it her all, but it isn't enough to overcome Lucy in the Sky's confused approach to its jumbled story." On Metacritic, the film has a weighted average score of 36 out of 100, based on 36 critics, indicating "generally unfavorable" reviews.

In a 2023 interview, director Noah Hawley reflected on his experience making Lucy in the Sky, stating he "did not have a great experience". Hawley explained, "In retrospect, the film was bought and set up as a Reese Witherspoon black comedy, and there must have been some extent to which Searchlight was expecting it to be that, and I delivered my magic realism astronaut movie [with Portman]. They didn't know what to do with that movie."

=== Accolades ===
At the 46th Saturn Awards, Lucy in the Sky earned three nominations: Best Science Fiction Film, Best Actress for Portman, and Best Supporting Actress for Burstyn.

== Controversy ==
In November 2018, retired astronaut Marsha Ivins, who flew five space missions, criticized the premise of Lucy in the Sky, denying the existence of a "longstanding idea that says astronauts begin to lose their grip on reality after being in space for an extended period of time". Following its premiere at the 2019 Toronto International Film Festival, the film faced additional criticism from multiple media outlets, some of which jokingly noted the omission of more salacious elements from Lisa Nowak's real-life case—most notably, her alleged use of adult diapers to avoid bathroom breaks during her journey.
