= List of United States of Tara episodes =

The following is a list of episodes from the Showtime original television series United States of Tara, created by Academy Award–winning screenwriter Diablo Cody and executive produced by Steven Spielberg. The series premiered on January 18, 2009, and aired its thirty-sixth and final episode on June 20, 2011.

== Series overview ==
Season	Episodes	Originally released	
Season	Episodes	First released	Last released
1	12	January 18, 2009	April 5, 2009
2	12	March 22, 2010	June 7, 2010
3	12	March 28, 2011	June 20, 2011

== Episodes ==
=== Season 1 (2009) ===
No. overall	No. in season	Title	Directed by	Written by	Original release date
1	1	"Pilot"	Craig Gillespie	Diablo Cody	January 18, 2009
Tara Gregson, a suburban mother diagnosed with dissociative identity disorder, is shocked to discover her teenage daughter Kate's morning after pill prescription. After speaking into a camera, Tara takes off all her clothes; Kate later comes home to find Tara's alternate personality—the provocative and rebellious teenager T. Tara's husband Max arrives, not surprised to find T instead of Tara; neither is their teenage son, Marshall. Tara's sister, Charmaine, expresses to Max that she does not believe Tara's DID is legitimate. Later that night, T and Max share a brief romantic encounter, but Max stops it, as Tara is not comfortable with him having sex with the alters. He makes T go to the shed, where she calms down and transitions back to Tara. The next morning, Tara drives by Kate's school and sees Kate being physically abused by her boyfriend, Benjamin; Tara unsuccessfully attempts to confront Benjamin. The incident causes Tara to transition into Buck, a loud and profane troublemaker. Marshall and Max convince Buck to go to Kate's dance recital, in which Buck starts a fight with Benjamin after the recital. The episode ends with the family bowling, with Buck and Marshall sharing a bonding moment.
2	2	"Aftermath"	Craig Gillespie	Diablo Cody	January 25, 2009
Speaking to a camera, Tara expresses her feelings about her alters. It is revealed that Tara has made the risky decision to go off her medication, in order to find the truth of her condition's source, and because the medication makes her feel befogged. Marshall gets into trouble at school for disagreeing with his English teacher; Marshall wants only Max to talk to his teacher, which makes Tara feel rejected by her family. While shopping with Charmaine, Tara runs into a group of moms from Marshall's school; the moms tell Tara that they did not expect her to contribute to the school's bake sale due to her DID. Upset, Tara transitions into Alice, an old-fashioned housewife. Alice shows up to the meeting with Marshall's teacher and successfully changes the teacher's mind. Meanwhile, needing a break from home, Kate applies for a job at Barnabeez, a family restaurant.
3	3	"Work"	Craig Gillespie	Diablo Cody	February 1, 2009
Tara returns after her recent bout of being Alice, with no recollection of what happened. She has a session with her psychiatrist, Dr. Ocean, expressing her fears that Max may be more interested in the alters than in her. Marshall tries out for a role in the school production of Grease, and strikes a friendship with Jason, a fellow student on the stage crew; Jason invites Marshall to his church club. Kate begins her new job as a waitress at Barnabeez and gets to know her boss, Gene. Charmaine refers Tara to a friend, Tiffany, who is looking for an interior designer. Initially pleased with the job, Tara grows uncomfortable when Tiffany reveals that Charmaine had told her about the dissociative identity disorder.
4	4	"Inspiration"	Mark Mylod	Alexa Junge	February 8, 2009
Tara's abnormal stress levels, the trigger of her DID, are starting to come down as she continues to work on Tiffany's mural. However, Tiffany continues to probe Tara about her alter personalities, making Tara uncomfortable. When Tara arrives the next morning to work on the mural, it has been vandalized with profanities about Tiffany, though it is unclear who did it. Believing Tara to be responsible, Tiffany fires Tara and Charmaine, and files a restraining order against Tara. Kate talks to Gene about selling Charmaine's protein powder products at Barnabeez; Gene does not approve of the idea. Marshall joins Jason's church club, having developed a crush on Jason. While doing outdoor work with Max, Marshall accidentally comes across a bee nest. Heavily allergic to bee stings, Marshall's face becomes disfigured; Marshall worries about looking bad in front of Jason.
5	5	"Revolution"	Mark Mylod	Alexa Junge	February 15, 2009
Tara and Max visit Dr. Ocean, while Marshall and Kate watch tapes of Tara's alters. Following the session, Max still believes Tara alone is the one who trashed Tiffany's mural. While listening to NPR on the radio, Tara transitions into T when the NPR show begins talking about DID. Now as her teenage alter, T steals her own car and flees to Fremont. Max and Charmaine chase after T and track her down to an arcade. Max wants to find out the root of Tara's DID; Charmaine encourages Max to talk to Tara's boarding school roommate, Heidi. Meanwhile, Marshall throws a party at home in order to get closer to Jason. When Max and T return home, Marshall angrily lashes out at T for trashing Tiffany's mural and causing Tara to miss his school events.
6	6	"Transition"	Brian Dannelly	Brett Baer & Dave Finkel	February 22, 2009
Tara's parents, Frank and Beverly, arrive to celebrate Charmaine's birthday. During the birthday party, all of the issues of Tara's family come to light: Beverly is always uptight and judgemental with everyone and everything; Frank, despite the fact that he loves his children and grandchildren, will always side with Beverly; Charmaine feels neglected by both her parents. Kate goes to Gene's apartment and begins a romantic relationship with him. Frank and Beverly also reveal that, due to Tara's DID, they want Kate and Marshall to live with them. Tara and Max are appalled, while Charmaine breaks down, claiming that everyone has always paid more attention to Tara than her. Although Tara seems to be fine following the incident, Max wakes up in the middle of the night to find her urinating on her father. Charmaine spends the night with Max's friend, Neil, whom she had a previous fling with.
7	7	"Alterations"	Tricia Brock	Diablo Cody	March 1, 2009
Max secretly turns to Dr. Ocean to discuss Tara's new alter. Charmaine finally decides to get corrective surgery on her breasts, and she asks Tara to pick her up and take care of her at home while she's recovering. Tara does not show up at the clinic; Buck does instead. Charmaine and Buck bond. Marshall feels that Jason has been ignoring him at school. Following Kate's advice, Marshall plays hard-to-get with Jason by ignoring him right back. Max decides to speak with Heidi, in hopes of discovering what caused Tara's DID. Heidi recollects a morning where Tara appeared to have been attacked; Heidi believes that her boyfriend at the time, Tripp Johannesen, may have assaulted Tara.
8	8	"Abundance"	Brian Dannelly	Joey Soloway	March 8, 2009
Max reveals the existence of a new alter to Tara, who becomes uncomfortable and nauseated upon discovering the new alter is animalistic. This causes Tara to transition into Alice, who mistakes Tara's vomiting for morning sickness and believes that she is pregnant. After Tara gets her period, Alice is distraught and thinks she has miscarried, leading Max to comfort her. Feeling smothered by Gene, Kate confronts Gene about ending their relationship, but Gene threatens to fire her if they break up. Marshall takes part in the opening night of Jason's youth group's hell house. Despite Marshall's concerns that Jason's pastor father knows about his crush on Jason, the boys grow closer.
9	9	"Possibility"	Tommy O'Haver	David Iserson	March 15, 2009
Needing a break from Gene, Kate heads off to a nearby resort with Tara. The two initially have a good time, until Tara catches Kate kissing an older man. This results in an argument that transitions Tara into T. Meanwhile, Gene shows up at the Gregson house to visit Kate, and he steals an old picture of Kate as a child. T visits a tattoo parlor to get the word 'slut' tattooed on her body; Kate returns and gets Tara to come back before the needle goes in. Tara and Kate end up getting matching Chinese characters in the same spot. Max attempts to relocate Tripp. Jason spends the night at Marshall's house to work on a project. While Jason is sleeping, Marshall kisses him; Jason wakes up, then returns the kiss.
10	10	"Betrayal"	John Dahl	Christopher Santos	March 22, 2009
While commenting to the camera, Tara reveals she can actually picture her alters. After discovering that Gene had stolen an old childhood photo of hers, Kate confides to a co-worker, and is informed that she may have grounds for sexual harassment. Dr. Ocean wants Tara to switch to a more experienced DID therapist, to both Max and Tara's dismay. This leads to Gimme's first daylight appearance at Charmaine's day spa, followed by T. Jason visits Marshall's house, just as T and a very embarrassed Charmaine return from the spa. While Max reveals the existence of Gimme to Kate and Marshall, T initiates a romantic encounter with Jason; Marshall walks in on Jason and T making out in the shed. Devastated and angry, Marshall later burns down the shed in revenge; he is angry not at T, but at Tara.
11	11	"Snow"	John Dahl	Alexa Junge	March 29, 2009
Tara checks into a trauma recovery facility that specializes in dissociation, where she meets Dr. Holden, who pushes for her to recover lost memories. Marshall, who has begun taking Xanax, refuses to talk with Tara. Believing that Marshall can never forgive him, Jason apologizes to Marshall and implies that their friendship is over. Kate goes to HR to mount a claim against Gene at Barnabeez, but is ultimately unsuccessful. Charmaine introduces Kate and Marshall to her new boyfriend, Nick. Neil meets Nick and confronts Charmaine about their past relationship. Tara reveals to Max that she wants to meet Tripp, who sexually assaulted her years before she met Max; Tara believes Tripp may be the cause of her DID.
12	12	"Miracle"	Craig Gillespie	Diablo Cody	April 5, 2009
Tara and Max agree to meet with Tripp at the clinic, under Dr. Holden’s supervision. Marshall finds out that Jason is going out with a girl. He gets Charmaine to drive him to Tara’s clinic, where he apologizes to his mother. Kate’s sexual harassment claim falls flat, though Gene ends up getting fired from Barnabeez. Gene shows up at Kate’s house and professes his intense love for her; Kate flees using Tara’s car. At the clinic, Tara and Max meet Tripp and his wife, and Tripp recollects all that he remembers from that night. When he gets up to leave, he says “See you, T.” This reveals that Tara had her alter-egos, or at least T, before the sexual assault, and something else earlier in her life must’ve caused her DID. Tara's DID goes crazy, and she quickly and wildly transitions between all her personalities. When it is over, Tara says that she wants to go home. The Gregsons go to the bowling alley, and the episode concludes with Max, Tara, Marshall and Kate bowling while the images of Tara's alters surround them.

=== Season 2 (2010) ===
No. overall	No. in season	Title	Directed by	Written by	Original release date	US viewers (millions)
13	1	"Yes"	Craig Zisk	Diablo Cody	March 22, 2010	0.82
The Gregson family donate all of Tara's alters' clothing. The whole family seems happy from the past three months: Kate has graduated early from high school after skipping a grade, and she gets a new job at a local debt collection agency; Marshall makes new friends at school, including Courtney and fellow gay student Lionel; Tara is on a new medication and is dissociation-free; Max experiences success at his job; Charmaine and Nick are in a happy relationship, and Nick proposes to Charmaine. When Tara's next-door neighbor commits suicide, the Gregson family is unexpectedly given responsibility of the house by the county, as their neighbor had no close family. The Gregsons make friends with Ted and Hany, a gay couple living in the neighborhood. After visiting the dead neighbor's house, Tara suddenly transitions into Buck. Buck visits a local bar and flirts with Pammy, a barmaid.
14	2	"Trouble Junction"	Craig Zisk	Joey Soloway	March 29, 2010	0.51
Buck has sex with Pammy. The next day, Pammy thanks Tara, mistaking her for Buck; Tara is distraught and devastated to realize her alternate personalities are emerging again, but she keeps it a secret from her family. Newly engaged with Nick, Charmaine moves in with the Gregsons so she can "revirginate" herself. Wanting to take up a new project, Max buys the dead neighbor’s house with plans to redecorate it with a modern design. At her new job, Kate confronts Lynda P. Frazier, who owes a debt of $30,000. After discovering that Lynda is an artist, Kate takes an interest in Lynda's illustrations of Princess Valhalla Hawkwind, a fictional superhero that Lynda had invented. Marshall contemplates his sexuality and begins a new relationship with a girl named Courtney, to Lionel's dismay. Tara re-transitions into Buck and makes love with Pammy again.
15	3	"The Truth Hurts"	Adam Davidson	Tracy McMillan	April 5, 2010	0.41
Buck continues to spend time with Pammy and her kids, while Tara cannot bring herself to tell Max that she is transitioning again. Tara ultimately confronts Pammy to breaks things off, but Pammy is unable to accept that Buck is a personality of Tara. Marshall continues a relationship with Courtney; Tara believes Marshall is confused. Neil is dismayed to learn of Charmaine and Nick's engagement. Kate has begun spending more time at Lynda's studio; Kate dresses up in a Valhalla Hawkwind costume for Lynda. Max hires a carpenter, Sully, to do work on the house next door; Sully takes Max's money but does not do the work as promised. Tara and Max take the family ice skating; Pammy follows the Gregsons to the skating rink and, on the microphone, announces her love for Buck. Realizing that Tara is transitioning again, an infuriated Max returns home and angrily punches Sully.
16	4	"You Becoming You"	Adam Davidson	Dave Finkel & Brett Baer	April 12, 2010	0.40
While in the house next door, Tara has memories of her childhood playing with Charmaine; a woman named Mimi scolds them for playing in the rain. Max has a difficult time coping with Buck's affair, and he is angry that Tara lied to him about the alters returning. After Kate's car breaks down outside Lynda's studio, Tara and Max arrive and meet Lynda in the process. Charmaine reveals that she's pregnant, and Nick expresses interest in buying the dead neighbor's house next door. Marshall has sex with Courtney, but appears dissatisfied by it. Realizing he is uninterested in Courtney, Marshall officially comes out of the closet to Max. After being urged by Max to seek help, Tara begins looking for a new therapist; Ted refers Tara to a book written by Shoshana Schoenbaum, his old therapist from New York. After reading Shoshana's book, Tara develops a new alter of the author.
17	5	"Doin' Time"	Craig Gillespie	Sheila Callaghan	April 19, 2010	0.47
Shoshana introduces herself to Max as Tara's new therapist. Though Max struggles to accept the new personality, Tara concludes that her new alter is helping her remember things from the past. Tara confides to Charmaine about her memories of Mimi. Marshall wants to break up with Courtney, but is unsure of how to do so. During her first ultrasound, Charmaine discovers that Neil is the father of her baby, and she reveals the news to Tara. Kate posts a video of herself dressed up as Valhalla Hawkwind online; the video then goes viral. Max is arrested for assaulting Sully. When Tara fails to show up at the police station, Max is forced to ask Neil to bail him out of jail. They go to a local bar, where Max meets Pammy. Trying to make sense of everything, Max turns to Shoshana, stating: "I just want someone who will listen."
18	6	"Torando!"	Craig Gillespie	Craig Wright	April 26, 2010	0.70
Shoshana has a "session" with Max. Max expresses his frustrations over Tara keeping Buck's affair a secret, and lying about finding a real therapist. Marshall tries to break up with Courtney, but she is perfectly comfortable with his homosexuality and wants them to remain an asexual power couple. A tornado warning begins in the area and as the weather worsens, the Gregsons, Ted, Hany, and Charmaine take shelter in the basement of the house next door. Tara rapidly goes through a number of her alters, and Shoshana decides they should have a group counseling session. Shoshana also reveals Charmaine's secret about the baby's father being Neil.
19	7	"Dept. of F'd Up Family Services"	Tricia Brock	Dave Finkel & Brett Baer	May 3, 2010	0.59
In the immediate aftermath of the tornado, Max races to clean up the house when he learns that, following his arrest, a social worker will be visiting them. Kate is disappointed when her stint at a comic book store in her Valhalla Hawkwind persona doesn't generate any interest. Tara befriends Lynda. Max informs Neil that Charmaine is pregnant with her baby; Neil advises Charmaine to get an abortion, and that she is not ready for motherhood. Marshall finally tells Courtney that he doesn't want to see her anymore, but she fails to understand. When Courtney calls him a liar, Marshall's temper explodes—he rants about what he secretly thinks of each family member, and mentions that Tara's DID is "gonna bury us all." Tara overhears Marshall, and she transitions into Gimme right before the social worker arrives.
20	8	"Explosive Diorama"	Penny Marshall	Diablo Cody & Joey Soloway	May 10, 2010	0.56
While on a date night with Nick, Charmaine reveals that Neil is the father of her baby; Nick is disappointed by the news, but they ultimately reconcile. Marshall grows closer to Lionel. Kate has begun online peep shows with people on the internet in her Valhalla Hawkwind persona. Tara and Lynda prepare for a neighborhood art show, despite Max and Kate being less-than-thrilled over their friendship. During the art show, Lynda encourages Tara's estrangement from her family, while Marshall and Lionel go on an Adderall binge with Hany in the bathroom. Tara overhears Max calling Tara's art "crap", which leads to a fight. Max storms out of the art show and goes to the bar to see Pammy.
21	9	"The Family Portrait"	Jamie Babbit	Craig Wright	May 17, 2010	0.56
Max and Pammy flirt at the bar and have sex. Tara hopes to reconnect with her family through her latest art project: a family portrait. Kate grows weary of the men she's meeting online, but she gets intrigued by Zach, a client who asks her out on a date. Kate ends her friendship with Lynda and returns her Valhalla Hawkwind costume. Marshall and Lionel have an interesting meeting with the school counselor, who assigns them to hand out condoms to the school community. Ted and Hany break up, indirectly because of Lionel and Hany's Adderall binge. Charmaine tries to get Neil to sign away his parental rights to the baby, now that Nick is on her side regarding the pregnancy. After having sex with Tara, Max confesses his one-night stand with Pammy.
22	10	"Open House"	Jamie Babbit	David Iserson	May 24, 2010	0.51
Tara recalls another childhood memory of Mimi; at a bicentennial parade, a young Tara tells Charmaine that they can't go home. Tara confides to Charmaine about Max's infidelity, as well as her new memories of Mimi, realizing that she only experiences the memories while in the house next door. After being encouraged by Charmaine, Tara asks Beverly about the childhood memories; Beverly quickly changes the subject to Charmaine's wedding. Neil gives Charmaine the forms signing away his parental rights. Max holds an open house for his newly finished re-model of the house. During the open house, Alice emerges, scaring off potential clients. Kate and Zach begin dating. Marshall and Lionel go cruising at a local park. After forgiving Max for his infidelity, Tara transitions into Buck, who punches Max for sleeping with Pammy.
23	11	"To Have and to Hold"	Craig Zisk	Tracy McMillan & Sheila Callaghan	May 31, 2010	N/A
After Kate tracks down Mimi's address, Tara and Charmaine drive to Lawrence to visit Mimi's house. They meet Mimi, who has a strong resemblance to Alice. After speaking with Mimi, Tara and Charmaine discover that they were placed in foster care as children; Mimi also tells them that she only took on the "worst cases." When Mimi's husband Dwayne walks in, Tara transitions into T and accuses Dwayne of molesting both girls; however, Dwayne was not around when Tara and Charmaine were in foster care. When Max arrives, Tara develops a new alter: Chicken, her five-year-old self. Meanwhile, Kate attempts to change her attitude and personality for Zach. Marshall begins to fall for Lionel despite his bad influence over him. Neil, discouraged by Charmaine's engagement, reveals to Max that he has decided to leave town.
24	12	"From This Day Forward"	Craig Zisk	Diablo Cody & Joey Soloway	June 7, 2010	0.63
Charmaine and Nick get ready for their wedding, which is at the Gregson house. Marshall brings Lionel to the wedding, but Lionel leaves after Zach reveals that he opposes gay marriage. Angered over Zach's controlling behavior, Kate orders Zach to leave. Beverly and Frank arrive, and it is revealed that Frank is experiencing the early stages of Alzheimer's. Tara is shocked when Frank, during a lucid moment, informs her about an absentee sibling. This causes Tara to transition into Chicken. Nick is upset over Tara's transition, and he leaves Charmaine at the altar just as the wedding ceremony begins. Following the ceremony, Tara confronts her parents over her repressed memories of Mimi. Beverly finally reveals that back in 1976, she and Frank placed Charmaine and Tara in foster care for two years because of Bryce, Frank's illegitimate teenage son who had sexually abused and molested the young girls; Tara's DID began shortly after Bryce's departure. Beverly and Frank hurriedly leave following the revelation, and Tara is comforted by her family. Meanwhile, upon learning that Charmaine got left at the altar, Neil returns to Kansas and cheers up Charmaine.

=== Season 3 (2011) ===
No. overall	No. in season	Title	Directed by	Written by	Original release date	US viewers (millions)
25	1	"...youwillnotwin..."	Craig Zisk	Diablo Cody	March 28, 2011	0.41
Tara's personalities have returned after several months of quietude. She has no memory of what they're doing, though Buck is looking for Bryce. Tara decides to go back to college and earn the few missing credits to earn her degree. This worries Max, who thinks the stress will trigger Tara's alters. Meanwhile, Charmaine's pregnancy is advancing, and she welcomes Neil's help and support after she experiences false labor. Kate, who loathes higher education, searches for a new job; however, her past internet life catches up with her. Marshall purchases a video camera for his film-making class with Lionel.
26	2	"Crackerjack"	Craig Zisk	Dave Finkel & Brett Baer	April 4, 2011	0.29
During her first Abnormal Psychology class, Tara transitions into Shoshanna and begins lecturing her fellow students, only to be interrupted by the actual professor, the cynical and mean-spirited Dr. Hattaras. Hattaras uses Tara's incident to later embarrass her in front of her classmates, as well as to vocalize his outright skepticism about DID. Marshall, Lionel, and Noah set out to make a movie for their film-making class. Max has his own worries when his biggest lawn-care competitor, Larry, offers to buy Max's business which, if Max accepts, would put Neil out of a job. Kate decides to move out of Charmaine's house when Neil moves in with Charmaine. When Kate finds an opportunity to leave the country to teach English in Japan, Max and Tara are less than thrilled.
27	3	"The Full Fuck You Finger"	Craig Zisk	Rolin Jones	April 11, 2011	0.41
Tara tries to manage college while planning a baby shower for an unappreciative Charmaine, causing Tara to transition without warning. With no time to rest, Tara's alters begin to fight for control of the body, with terrible and physical consequences for Charmaine. Kate's plans to travel to Japan are derailed by a natural earthquake disaster, but a chance meeting with a beautiful flight attendant leaves Kate to wonder if there are better possibilities to pursue without permanently leaving the country. Max must visit his compulsive and insane mother, Sandy, to get her signature and sell the family business to OrgaLawn. A few days later, Marshall returns with Max to help clean his grandmother's house and learns some things about his father's past that make him worry about the strength of his own family ties.
28	4	"Wheels"	Penny Marshall	Ron Fitzgerald	April 18, 2011	0.33
When she finally goes into labor, Charmaine is rushed to the hospital. She declares that Tara be kept away from her newborn child, with Neil at Charmaine's side. Tara's stress about her upcoming mid-term exams almost pushes Max to the boiling point. Fed up and frustrated, Tara gathers all of her alters and attempts to make a deal, intriguing Dr. Hattaras. Kate is stranded at the airport with a charmingly clueless luggage handler named Ray. Marshall, Lionel, and Noah use Charmaine's empty house to experiment with each other in new and exciting ways.
29	5	"Dr. Hatteras' Miracle Elixir"	Penny Marshall	Elizabeth Benjamin	April 25, 2011	0.33
Unable to stand the mean and cynical Dr. Hattaras, Tara attempts to drop his psych class, but he proposes an alternative idea to allow her to be a case study of his that Tara's not entirely sure about. Charmaine and Neil find out that raising a baby is harder than it looks. Despite Tara's attempts to help, Charmaine remains committed to keeping Tara away from the baby. Max is having trouble in his new job and finds himself at odds with his new boss. Kate begins flight attendant training classes. Lionel walks in on Marshall and Noah being suspiciously close and flirty, leaving their relationship and their entry to the New York High School Film Festival in jeopardy.
30	6	"The Road to Hell Is Paved with Breast Intentions"	Jamie Babbit	David Iserson	May 2, 2011	0.32
Tara seems to be making progress with Dr. Hattaras, as her alters seem to have found a way to co-exist; they are respecting each other's space, only coming out when it's agreeable to all. However, Dr. Hattaras discovers something disturbing in an audio tape from one of her therapy sessions. Much to Tara and Charmaine's chagrin, Neil invites Beverly to visit her grandchild. Neil, however, has an ulterior motive to ask Beverly for money; Beverly reveals she is broke after having put Frank into hospice care. As a result, Neil and Charmaine decide to leave town in order to look for work. Max is unhappy at his new job, but can't discuss his feelings to Tara, knowing that any stress will cause Tara's alters to re-emerge. Marshall and Noah trade ideas on what their next video project should be, in the process finding inspiration in old videos of Tara and Max. Newly licensed flight attendant Kate is surprised when a handsome flyer named Evan rebuffs her flirting.
31	7	"The Electrifying & Magnanimous Return of Beaverlamp"	Jamie Babbit	Sheila Callaghan	May 9, 2011	0.29
Max is delighted by Tara's suggestion that he reunite his old college-era rock band, Beaverlamp. Tara is turned away from further sessions by a strangely depressed Dr. Hattaras, who is dealing with a personal crisis of his own. Despite her disastrous first attempt, Tara tries to arrange Charmaine's baby shower, but it happens to be on the same day as Max's return to the stage with his reunited band. Kate finally connects with Evan. Marshall and Noah stage a tense, revealing interview with Max for their film festival project. Marshall gets disappointed that Noah won't be able to travel with him at the New York Film Festival for the premiere of their short film.
32	8	"Chicken 'n' Corn"	Craig Zisk	Dave Finkel & Brett Baer	May 16, 2011	0.23
A scare at a local corn maze leaves Tara and her alters shaken. Max visits Dr. Hatteras (as does Alice, without Tara knowing) telling him he has an obligation to continue his work with Tara. He agrees, but Alice tells him that one of the alters has disappeared. Needing a break, Charmaine asks Tara to take care of the baby for the day while she goes to a spa. While babysitting, Tara unexpectedly comes out of an altered state in the middle of nowhere; she not only doesn't know where she is, but has no idea which of her alters had emerged. Max and Marshall fly to New York City to submit Marshall's short film, but Max's extreme fear of flying makes for a less than pleasant experience. Kate lands on a return flight to St. Louis where she meets Evan and his bratty young son.
33	9	"Bryce Will Play"	Adam Bernstein	Rolin Jones	May 23, 2011	0.31
Tara's new violent alter is Bryce, her abusive and violent half-brother. Dr. Hattaras and Tara seek the help of Dr. Smolow, the chairman of the college psychology department. Tara is upset over the disappearance of Chicken, but Hatteras convinces her to stick with him and let him attempt to help her. Dr. Smolow informs Dr. Hattaras that he may be in over his head in dealing with Bryce, but Hattaras tells Smolow that he has everything under control. Meanwhile, Bryce kills both Shoshana and Gimme. After Bryce tries to poison Dr. Hattaras by feeding him crab, to which he is deathly allergic, Dr. Smolow tells her she must cut all ties with Hatteras and urges her to attend a clinic in Boston that specializes in DID. Kate continues her long distance relationship with Evan despite the interference of his impish son. In New York, Max discovers that Marshall's short film is about him; Marshall is confused when the film clearly hurts Max's feelings.
34	10	"Train Wreck"	Bille Eltringham	David Iserson & Sheila Callaghan	June 6, 2011	0.33
A heavily-medicated Tara rids the house of all Bryce-ness, in preparation for the return of Max and Marshall from New York. Max is shocked to learn of Dr. Hattaras' swift departure from town and is nervous about its implications on his wife's mental health. Kate and Evan continue their struggle to define their relationship. Returning to school, Marshall gets the shocking news that Lionel had died in a car accident. At Lionel's funeral, chaos ensues when Bryce emerges and causes a violent scene. Later, Max confronts Bryce about when Tara is coming back; Bryce responds "She's not," and cuts off Tara's hair.
35	11	"Crunchy Ice"	Craig Zisk	Ron Fitzgerald	June 13, 2011	0.28
Bryce wreaks havoc on the Gregson family. Marshall has moved in with Sandy to keep distance from his family; he grieves the loss of Lionel, as well as Tara, who he fears no longer exists. Kate spends more time with Evan and his son in St. Louis, while Neil tries to persuade a reluctant Charmaine that moving to Houston, Texas would be the best thing for their child. One by one, Tara's other alters begin disappearing. After Bryce kills Alice, he sets his sights on completely taking over by eliminating Tara's original identity; Max realizes he has to take action before Bryce can do any more damage. He decides to keep Buck's guns and porn magazines inside Neil's home, which leads to the latter discovering that, before dying, Buck had indeed traced Tara and Charmaine's real half-brother Bryce Craine, who had died in a mental hospital nine years earlier. After Bryce attacks Marshall, Tara briefly resurfaces, and Max takes the opportunity to drive her to the clinic. While driving, Tara gets Max to stop the car. She tells him she loves him, then gets out and jumps off a bridge.
36	12	"The Good Parts"	Craig Zisk	Dave Finkel & Brett Baer	June 20, 2011	0.38
In the series finale, Tara finally confronts Bryce. After jumping off the bridge, Tara has a confrontation with Bryce in her mind and "kills" him. Max wants Tara to go to the institution in Kansas City, but she convinces him to let her go to the doctor in Boston that Hatteras recommended. Tara tries to get everyone to have one last family dinner before she goes. The dinner does not go as planned-Marshall is still angry with Tara, and Max flips out when they ask him to make a speech. Kate tells Evan that although she would like to be with him, she must stay home in Kansas with Marshall while Tara and Max are in Boston for three months. Meanwhile, Neil eases Charmaine's fears about Houston, and she proposes to him. After jokingly refusing, he accepts. Marshall finally forgives Tara and visits a memorial for Lionel. As Tara is about to get in Max's pickup truck to head to Boston, she sees T, Alice, and Buck silently sitting in the bed of the truck, battered and bruised but definitely still alive. As Max and Tara drive away, she sticks her head out of the window to enjoy the warm sun and moving air, embracing the unknown future that awaits.
