= List of United States of Tara characters =

The list of United States of Tara characters centers on the Gregson family. The series follows the family as it deals with Tara Gregson and her struggles with dissociative identity disorder. Her family, including husband Max, children Kate and Marshall, and sister Charmaine, serve as her support system. Secondary characters include love interests, neighbors, friends, and Tara's therapists. Tara's "alters", or alternate personalities, stand as characters in their own rights and continually interact with the other characters and sometimes with each other and Tara.

== Main characters ==
=== Tara Gregson ===
Tara Gregson, née Craine, (Toni Collette) is the central character of the series. She is an extremely talented woman who would like to nurture her growth as an artist, but can't for balancing everything else in her life, including her job as a mural painter, her husband and two teenage children, and her dissociative identity disorder. Tara is the system's 'host' personality, and her natural personality is somewhat of a mixture of all her alters. By the beginning of season two she is able to become aware of her alters (co-consciousness) and communicate with them while still being conscious. The series begins shortly after she made the decision to stop taking her medication, which allows her underlying vulnerabilities (her alters) to re-emerge. In the time leap of three months between seasons one and two, she begins taking her medication again, and it works for a while. In the final episode of season three Tara takes drastic measures and throws herself off a bridge, but survives and manages to kill her "abuser" alter. Diablo Cody, the show's creator, has stated that Tara isn't being irresponsible by not taking the medication, but rather "wants a chance to try living with her condition, instead of smothering it with drugs" because it is "clear ... that she is not receiving proper treatment for her dissociative identity disorder". Tara's "therapist" alter is shown promoting this view to a student class, before her professor intervenes. Collette has said that she is "excited" and "absolutely in love" with the project.

=== Max Gregson ===
Max Gregson (John Corbett), Tara's husband, is a nurturing man who unconditionally supports Tara and attempts to resolve conflicts and support her. He acts as caretaker to both of his children and, despite the challenges and frustrations, Max is a committed husband and father. The New Yorker called him "a member of that strange breed of TV husband that exhibits infinite patience". Max's own father left him and his mother during his childhood due to her mental illness which may motivate his fierce commitment to his family and to supporting his wife through. Throughout season two, Tara thinks that the only reason they are still together is because he views her as a "project". He is very close to both of his children, Marshall and Kate. He ran a landscaping business for the first two seasons until selling it to a competitor, for which he goes to work, in season three. Max had a one-night stand with Pammy in her bar. He has an extreme fear of flying, as shown in the season 3 episode, "Chicken 'n' Corn".

=== Kate Gregson ===
Kate Gregson (Brie Larson) is Tara's and Max's troubled teenage daughter. She is self-indulgent, often cruel, very naive, sexually promiscuous, and selfish. She considers herself wise about the world and constantly tries to educate Marshall, the family member with whom she has the closest relationship. In the pilot episode, Tara transitions into teenage alter-ego T when she finds a prescription for the morning-after pill in Kate's backpack. Kate is also shown to have a boyfriend named Benjamin, but their relationship quickly ends after Tara sees him shove her. Early on in the first season, Kate takes a job at a chain family restaurant. She briefly enters into a casual relationship with her manager, Gene, but grows uncomfortable with his advances and initiates a sexual harassment complaint against him. At the beginning of the second season, it is revealed that Kate received her high school diploma early by taking the GED. She then works at a debt collection agency. In her free time she smoked marijuana with Marshall and made super heroine videos with her friend Lynda. She briefly did internet peep shows as Princess Valhalla Hawkwind in exchange for gifts on her online gift registry. She soon stopped, when she met a man named Zac (over the internet in a webcam chat), and started dating him, but she broke things off near the end of season 2. She is eager to leave town and find a new, alters-free life elsewhere yet she is ultimately unable to abandon her mother in her unending personal crisis. In season 3, she plans to teach English in Japan but abruptly changes career goals, taking a job as an airline stewardess instead. Through her job, she meets and starts a serious relationship with a man named Evan. During the series finale, Kate tells Evan she wants to move with him to St. Louis, but not until her mother finishes her treatment.

=== Marshall Gregson ===
Marshall Gregson (Keir Gilchrist) is Tara's and Max's son, and the "baby" of the family. He is old-fashioned, loves classic films, and wants to be a director when he grows up. Creator Diablo Cody has addressed Marshall's being gay as "just matter-of-fact" and "definitely wasn't intended as any sort of plot point". Though the family is supportive of Marshall, Buck is slightly homophobic and often makes disparaging remarks; Cody thought "it would be really fun" to have the dichotomy of Tara being "incredibly supportive" while Buck is "kind of a homophobe", though "he actually does love Marshall". Marshall is extremely sensitive, loyal, and kind, but is also vindictive if pushed over the edge. In the tenth episode of season one, he sets the shed on fire, following T's indiscretion with Jason in the shed. Tara's pet name for Marshall is "Marshmallow," while Kate endearingly calls him "Moosh." He crushes on Jason, an older boy at his school. The two kiss but after an incident with T, Marshall ends things with Jason. He then begins to date a girl, Courtney. However, after having sex with her, Marshall comes to realize he is gay. Marshall gets a boyfriend in season 2, Lionel, his openly gay best friend and first official boyfriend. In season 3 Marshall and Lionel break up and Marshall begins a relationship with Noah, a new classmate. After Lionel is killed in a car accident, Marshall acts openly hostile towards his family, especially his mother, but is eventually able to find closure by visiting the site of Lionel's accident. Gilchrist has been praised for his portrayal, and singled out as "the real breakout star ... [his] expressive, trusting face will definitely break your heart in some scenes".

=== Charmaine Craine ===
Charmaine Craine (Rosemarie DeWitt) is Tara's self-absorbed younger sister. At the beginning of the show she resents Tara for always being the center of attention and accuses her of faking her disorder. As the show goes on it is shown that she truly wants to hate Tara for always getting what she wants, but can't due to Tara always looking out for her and being the only person who doesn't get annoyed by her next to Neil. Cody wrote Charmaine as an antagonist because she wanted "a voice for the skeptics". She worked for a mail-order vitamin company before an incident involving one of Tara's alters caused her to lose her job. Her first husband pressured her into getting breast augmentation surgery, which resulted in deformed, lopsided breasts. She undergoes corrective surgery, and starts to bond with Buck, who takes care of her while she recovers, after Tara transitions because she cannot cope. In the season 2 premiere she gets engaged to Nick. She also finds out she's pregnant and discovers the baby is Neil's. Neil is a short chubby ex-boyfriend and a friend of Max's, and Charmaine admits to Tara that she is still attracted to him, while also in love with her tall, fit, handsome fiancé, Nick, who subsequently leaves her at the altar. At the end of season 2, Tara and Charmaine begin to understand that Charmaine's ignorance of the abuses she and Tara suffered as children is a result of Tara's protection of her sister, which is linked to the formation of her earliest and youngest alters. In the season 3 episode "Wheels", Charmaine gives birth to her daughter, whom Neil names Cassandra "Wheels" Kowalski. Like Tara, Charmaine also suffered trauma due to their childhood. Though it isn't shown as the series goes on, it is clear that she suffers from being a chronic liar, has a hard time being empathetic and sympathetic, and is boldly selfish. In Season 3, Charmaine tells Tara that she is off limits to her baby after T threatened Charmaine with a near-miss car hit in a parking lot, causing Charmaine's water to break. Charmaine later allows alter Alice to help take care of the baby (and Alice proves to be superb in her assistance). She is horrified when what turns out to be Tara's worst, most evil alter (Bryce) kidnaps Wheels, but Tara brings her back safely. At the end of the series, Charmaine decides to move to Texas with Neil for his new job so that way they can be a family; she also asks Neil to marry her.

== The alters ==
Toni Collette plays all of Tara's alternate personalities, referred to as "alters". Whenever Tara is stressed or has strong emotions she cannot handle, she uncontrollably transitions. As the series began Tara suffers from dissociative amnesia and generally had no memories of what her alters did, but as it progressed Tara began becoming more aware of the alters and was able to feel them inside her and eventually communicate with them. On several occasions the alters were depicted talking to one another and in one instance all of the then-known alters attended a summit meeting of sorts, drawing up a "contract" for when each alter was allowed control of the body. As of the series premiere Tara was aware of three alters, Alice, Buck and T. By the end of the second season three additional personalities had been discovered, Gimme, Chicken, and Shoshana Schoenbaum. By the middle of the third season a seventh, violent alter emerged, Bryce. Bryce subsequently "killed" all of the other alters, leaving just him and Tara. However, Alice, T and Buck reappeared in the series finale, showing that they survived.

=== Alice ===
Alice is a "June Cleaver-esque" housewife, who has been around for the longest time, dating back to Tara's childhood. She is extremely domineering, believing herself to be the 'true' personality rather than Tara and wanting permanent control of the body. Once she stated that she is the "keeper" for all of Tara's other alters, and it is implied that she can help control which alters are allowed to front. In episode 12 of season 1, when confronted by Dr. Holden, Alice says that Tara is weak, and that she needs her. She believes herself to be married to Max as well, and makes advances on him and wants to have a child. She likes Kate and Marshall, but views them as Tara's children. She claims to have attended the Radcliffe Institute for Advanced Study at Harvard University. She abhors Gimme and seemed to be the only alter who is aware of his existence before he fronts towards the end of the first season. Alice is a very devout Catholic, the only one of Tara's personalities, including Tara, who deals with religion. She prays every night for herself and all of the other alters, including (begrudgingly) Gimme. Both she and Tara cared a lot about the death of the Gregsons' neighbor. When Charmaine and Tara travel out of town to meet their old caretaker Mimi, it is instantaneously obvious that Alice was based on her. In season three, Alice appeared to Marshall, saying she is very proud of how he turned out to be before smacking him in the face, meaning Alice was killed during this conversation and converted straight to Bryce. In the final episode Alice is seen apparently alive in the back of Max's truck as he and Tara prepare to leave.

=== Buck ===
Buck is a loud and profane troublemaker, characterized by Collette as "the aggressive protector type, a man's man". He explains his lack of a penis by claiming that it was blown off in the Vietnam War. Buck has a gun named Persephone and sometimes goes to the shooting range with Max and Marshall. Collette said that Buck is her favorite of the original four personalities "just because he's most challenging", though she has to "always be careful not to make him a stereotype." Unlike Tara and the other alters, Buck is left-handed. He is a heavy drinker and smoker. He wears large glasses and a trucker hat. Buck is loudly attracted to women, hitting on Kate's friends and claiming to have had sex with a waitress at the local bowling alley, who gave him crabs. In season two he embarks on a love affair with Pammy, the bartender at the pub Tara, Max, Charmaine and Neil sometimes attend. Buck was killed by Bryce in the penultimate episode of the series. While hiding behind a kitchen counter, he said goodbye to Max and asked for one last beer before his death. In the final episode Buck is seen apparently alive in the back of Max's truck as he and Tara prepare to leave.

=== T ===
T is a 16-year-old girl. She smokes marijuana and is wild and flirty. She is provocative in her mannerisms and style of dress. She relates well with Kate, providing her with the morning-after pill and frequently attempting to take her on shopping sprees with Tara's credit cards. She is very good at playing Dance Dance Revolution and manages to dance in style. She often tries to seduce Max. He refuses her since he and Tara have an agreement that having sex with any of the alters would cause too many problems (although under their previous agreement, Max and T did have sex). Her unruly and selfish actions often disrupt Tara's life. After a major hiatus (Alice said she resorted to Seattle and became a gutterpunk), T makes a brief and wild return in the penultimate episode of season two in order to confront Duane, Mimi's partner. In season 3, T grows more volatile, getting into a physical fight with Kate and inducing Charmaine's labor by nearly hitting her with Tara's car. After a long while, T managed to get a hold of Tara's body. T tells Kate how she was always jealous of her and says goodbye to Kate before being killed by Bryce. In the final episode T is seen apparently alive in the back of Max's truck as he and Tara prepare to leave.

=== Gimme ===
Gimme appeared at the end of episode six of season one, but its existence was foreshadowed on multiple occasions before, mostly by Alice. It is first mentioned three episodes earlier, as Alice finds the word "Gimme" written on the bathroom wall. However, she instantly uses a hand towel to erase it thanks to her perfectionist behavior before transitioning back to Tara. Gimme is not so much a human as an animalistic expression of pure id. It is very destructive, and makes awful screams. Max was the first to see it, urinating on Tara's father in the middle of the night. He describes Gimme as a "poncho goblin". The first time Gimme appeared in public was four episodes later at a spa trip — Tara mentioned before that being touched (except by Max) makes her uncomfortable. The third and most recent time Gimme has been shown is after Marshall's monologue where he goes off on Courtney. According to interviews with the cast and crew, it was the one who broke into Tiffany's house and vandalized the mural Tara was doing for her. In the season three episode "Bryce Will Play" Gimme is killed by Bryce. Bryce pins up Gimme's poncho and viciously stabs it.

=== Shoshana Schoenbaum ===
When Ted Mayo lends Tara a book written by Shoshana Schoenbaum, his old therapist in New York, Tara adopts Shoshana's persona as her new alter. Ted Mayo comments with shock that she perfectly resembles the real Shoshana Schoenbaum. She appears as a stereotypical 1970s feminist, and speaks with a New York accent. She is the most psychologically profound alter. After the incident in which her relapses came to light, Tara told others she had found a great shrink, but actually she was seeing herself and didn't even know it. In several scenes Tara and Shoshana converse with each other. A good example is when Max tentatively allows himself to be seen by Shoshana, Tara is portrayed as showing up to find her appointment stolen, and waits outside the closed door. In the season three episode "Bryce Will Play" Shoshana is killed by Bryce. The book that Ted gave to Tara was burned, making Tara unable to "feel" Shoshana.

=== Chicken ===
Chicken first appears in the second-to-last episode of season two and is a mental presentation of Tara's 5-year-old self. She wants to be a flower girl in Charmaine's wedding, but later, when the wedding is called off, annoys Charmaine by poking her and calling her 'Char-Char'. They get into a fight and Chicken accidentally pokes Charmaine in the eye. Charmaine says that Chicken hurt her, to which Chicken replies that she does everything she does so Charmaine does not get hurt. In the season three episode "Chicken 'n' Corn" Chicken gets scared in a cornfield and runs aimlessly, and is found momentarily as Tara in a small shack. Days later Alice tells Dr. Hatterras that Chicken is missing. Tara and Dr. Hatterras go to a cornfield trying to look for Chicken. Tara hears Chicken screaming and runs to the screams. Tara later tells him that Chicken has been killed. Bryce kills Chicken by ripping up Chicken's stuffed animal.

=== Bryce Craine ===
Bryce Craine is Tara's half-brother (via Tara's father) who molested her as a child. Dr. Hattarras describes him as a 14-year-old psychopath. Bryce's unnamed presence is first manifested in the season three premiere, when he types "you will not win" over and over on Tara's computer when Tara tries to write a term paper. He next emerges during a therapy session with Dr. Hatterras, a recording of which the doctor is seen transcribing, saying "you will not win." Bryce emerges in the episode "The Electrifying & Magnanimous Return of Beaverlamp" when he smashes a beer bottle and gouges Tara's arm with it. He finally emerges and names himself in the episode "Chicken 'n' Corn", telling Dr. Hatterras that he has murdered Chicken, and that Tara is next. He later kills Shoshana and Gimme, and tries to kill Buck, T, and Alice, although they apparently survive. In the final episode Tara finally kills Bryce by drowning him.

The real Bryce Craine committed suicide, shooting himself on Christmas Day 2002.

== Recurring characters introduced in season one ==
=== Neil Kowalski ===
Neil Kowalski (Patton Oswalt) is Max's former co-worker at Four Winds Landscaping and best friend. He had a one-night stand with Charmaine two years before the series began, and they have been casually hooking up ever since. He becomes angry after finding out about Charmaine's engagement, since he still has feelings for her. After Charmaine gets pregnant, it is revealed that she slept with Neil while her fiancée was out of town. When Neil discovers this, he gets drunk and tells her to get an abortion. He immediately regrets this, but his outburst causes Charmaine's fiancée Nick to ask him to terminate his parental rights. He planned to move to Odessa, Texas, but reappears when he learns that Nick left Charmaine at the altar. Charmaine, still in her wedding dress, agrees to go out for drinks with Neil after noting that she will not be consuming alcohol due to being pregnant with their daughter. In Season 3, Neil proposes to a very pregnant Charmaine at a family party. She says no, but eventually he convinces her to accept his care-taking and moves in with her. He is left unemployed when Max sells his business and the new bosses make him cut Neil loose. Charmaine is angry at his lack of ambition and leaves him hurt when she says "This is why we would never work." Charmaine gives birth to their daughter in the episode "Wheels", and Neil names her Cassandra "Wheels" Kowalski. He then takes a job with his brother selling farm equipment. He coparents with Charmaine, tries to protect Charmaine and Wheels from Tara's alter, Bryce. By the end of Season 3, Charmaine seems to be in love with Neil and proposes to him.

=== Frank and Beverly Craine ===
Frank (Fred Ward) and Beverly Craine (Pamela Reed) are Tara and Charmaine's parents, who first visit in episode 6 and suggest that Marshall and Kate move in with them because of Tara's condition. Tara and Max reject their idea, subsequently asking them to leave. Beverly visited again in season 2 to console Charmaine about her situation and was rude to Tara but revealed Mimi's full name when Tara transitioned to Alice. In the second-season finale, it's revealed that Frank has a son from a previous marriage. The son, a 14-year-old named Bryce, was mentally ill being a diagnosed psychopath, and his mother forfeited custody of him to Frank. While living with the Craines, it is revealed that Bryce sexually abused both three-year-old Tara as well as Charmaine when she was a baby, and thus Bev pleaded with Frank to find a mental facility for Bryce or relinquish him to be adopted, however, Frank threatened to leave Bev if she cast Bryce out of the house. Until an acceptable solution could be found, Bev arranged for the girls to live in foster care temporarily. Tara and Charmaine were placed with Mimi Parmeter where they lived for two years before Bryce was sent away after turning age 18. Bryce's whereabouts were unknown at the time that Tara and Charmaine went to visit Mimi. Tara expressed anger at her parents for withholding the information for so long when these events could have helped Tara not develop DID in first place. Bev says how sorry she is, and they leave. Also in the season 2 finale it is revealed that Frank has Alzheimer's disease, which explains what everyone previously considered as partial insanity. During a visit in season three, Beverly tells Charmaine and Neil that Frank has been institutionalized because of his condition.

=== Nick Hurley ===
Nick Hurley (Matthew Del Negro) is an Environmental lawyer and Charmaine's boyfriend turned fiancé. He is first mentioned in the season one episode "Possibility" and makes his first on-screen appearance in "Snow" having dinner with Charmaine and Marshall. In the second season opener, Nick and Charmaine's relationship has progressed significantly. After proposing to Charmaine and buying the Hubbard house, he is extremely happy about Charmaine's surprise pregnancy. When he finds out the baby isn't his, he agrees to stay with Charmaine when she explains that she does not want Neil involved in the child's life. He also demands that Neil terminates his rights. In the second-season finale, Tara interferes with the wedding by the reappearance of her alter Chicken. Already offset at her infidelity and constant lying, he leaves Charmaine at the altar by explaining to their guests that he was someone who believed in signs, and that there were many signs that he and Charmaine do not belong together.

=== Jason Maurio ===
Jason Maurio (Andrew Lawrence) is Marshall's potential love interest and friend. Jason is the son of a local pastor. He is shown to be confused about his sexuality. In episode 9, when Marshall kisses him, Jason kisses him back. T lures Jason into the Gregson's backyard shed in episode 10, where she asks him if he likes boys or girls. Jason's response is the same to both: "maybe". Marshall discovers the pair kissing, prompting him to burn down the shed. In episode 11, Jason "breaks up" with Marshall because he thinks Marshall will never forgive him for making out with T. Kate later tries to make Marshall feel better by saying Jason is a "bi-curious church monkey" and claims that a relationship between Marshall and Jason will never work because Jason is only experimenting and will end up marrying a woman. Petula texts Marshall in episode 12 to say she saw Jason at Starbucks on a date with a female classmate.

=== Gene Stuart ===
Gene Stuart (Nate Corddry) is Kate's boss at the restaurant who is in his early 20s, and with whom Kate has a quite meaningless one-night stand. He becomes increasingly obsessed with her and wants more out of their relationship, despite her not feeling the same way. In episode 10, Kate files a sexual harassment claim against him, as he often makes inappropriate remarks and frequently finds excuses to touch the other teenage girls at the restaurant. In the Season 1 finale, he was fired, but continued his unwanted advances towards Kate, breaking into the Gregson home. He waits for Kate on the couch, and when she arrives he expresses his obsessive love for her. Fearing for her safety, Kate steals her mother's car, running into several small objects as she flees.

=== Petula ===
Petula (Hayley McFarland) is Marshall's best friend, who is dismissive of Marshall's interest in Jason and the Hell House. She is not seen after Season 1, and Lionel becomes Marshall's best friend in Season 2.

=== Tiffany ===
Tiffany (Jessica St. Clair) is a woman who worked with Charmaine and who hired Tara to paint a mural. The mural is later defaced by one of the alters (Gimme), possibly because it felt that she was being disrespectful toward Tara and her DID by asking Tara to "show" her one of the alters. In response to the vandalism, Tiffany takes out a restraining order against Tara and has Charmaine fired.

=== Dr. Ellyn Ocean ===
Dr. Ocean (Valerie Mahaffey) is Tara's original therapist who ultimately directs Tara to a specialist.

=== Dr. Holden ===
Dr. Holden (Joel Gretsch) is Tara's therapist at a clinic specializing in DID.

== Recurring characters introduced in season two ==
=== Pammy ===
Pammy (Joey Lauren Adams) is a female bartender with whom Buck has a sexual relationship. She is divorced and has two young daughters named Kammy and Kimmy. Tara (as Buck) is her first female-sexed partner. Pammy feels betrayed when Tara attempts to explain her multiple personalities to her, but later follows Tara to an ice rink where she professes her love for Buck over the public address system. In a later episode Max has a one-night stand with Pammy.

=== Courtney ===
Courtney (Zosia Mamet) is Marshall's best friend. While Marshall is struggling with his sexual identity, the two date and have sex. Marshall feels very uncomfortable throughout the relationship, and feels burdened by her sexual desires, when in reality she is just as inexperienced as he. She also has plans for them as a couple and expects them to be married eventually. After seeing how controlling she is being, and with counsel from his friends, and accepting that he is gay in the first place, Marshall breaks up with Courtney, but he must say it multiple times before she finally gets it.

=== Ted Mayo ===
Ted Mayo (Michael Hitchcock) is one of Tara's gay neighbors, who befriends the family at the beginning of season 2. He gives Tara a book by his former therapist which later inspires her alter Shoshana Schoenbaum. He was Hany's partner until Hany binged on Adderall the night of Tara's art show. Hany left Ted the next day. Afterwards, Ted grows fond of the Gregson family and becomes their friend, taking part in most of their celebrations.

=== Hany ===
Hany (Sammy Sheik) is Ted Mayo's younger partner. He is a native of Egypt. After an Adderall binge, he leaves Ted.

=== Lionel Trane ===
Lionel Trane (Michael J. Willett) is an expressive and abrasive gay teen who starts the school's LGBT advocacy group. Marshall resents him at first because he is too over-the-top and seems to like drama and conflict, but over the course of season two, they become best friends, and eventually boyfriends. Marshall and Lionel break up but remain friends until Lionel is killed in an off-screen automobile accident.

=== Lynda Frazier ===
Lynda P. Frazier (Viola Davis) is an artist from whom Kate attempts to collect debts but instead befriends, having found particular fascination with Lynda's character "Princess Valhalla Hawkwind", which the pair make into an internet video series starring Kate. Tara also later befriends her, which inspires Tara to start devoting more personal time to art again. However, Lynda also encourages Tara's estrangement from her family, leading to an ugly argument between Tara and Max that causes Max to angrily cheat on her with Pammy. Kate ends up returning the PVH outfit to Lynda and makes it clear they will never see each other again.

=== Zach ===
Zach (Seth Gabel) is a rich 27-year-old who Kate meets on her website and ends up dating. He is constantly buying her expensive things, and has promised to buy her a condo so that way she can escape the craziness of her family. It was revealed that he is a Republican, which he "softens" by indicating that he voted for Ron Paul in the 2008 US Presidential Election. He further reveals that he does not believe in gay marriage which appalls her as she feels that it is an insult to her brother Marshall. For this and speaking negatively about Tara, Kate ejected him from Charmaine's incomplete wedding to Nick.

== Recurring characters introduced in season three ==
=== Dr. Jack Hattarras ===
Dr. Jack Hattarras (Eddie Izzard) appears in season three as Tara's psychology professor. He wrote a book about rehabilitating a patient that believed he was a kite. At first he is a DID skeptic, calling her a "delusional liar or an attention-seeking dramatist" in front of the class; however, after more observation he becomes fascinated with Tara as a subject, leading him to further explore the condition in hopes of writing a paper. His work with Tara seems to be going well until his "kite" patient kills himself. In the episode "Bryce Will Play", Bryce tries to murder Dr. Hattarras by spiking his food with crab, to which he is deathly allergic. After this incident, his boss forces him to withdraw from Tara's life. During his final appearance, he admits that Tara has changed his views on DID and that he now believes in her disorder.

=== Noah Kane ===
Noah Kane (Aaron Christian Howles) is a classmate of Marshall and Lionel's. As an openly gay student, he is introduced when Marshall and Lionel are assigned to work with him on a video project for their film-making class; much to Marshall's annoyance since he believes the teacher purposefully put all the gay kids in the same group. He later finds himself in the middle of their relationship when Lionel initiates a threesome with him and Marshall. When Lionel discovers that Marshall has developed romantic feelings for Noah, he ends their relationship, and Marshall and Noah become boyfriends. The couple collaborate on a short film together and win a place in a national film festival. Because of Lionel's death, the state of his and Marshall's relationship is left up in the air when the show ends.

=== Evan ===
Evan (Keir O'Donnell) is Kate's love interest in season three. They meet on a commuter plane trip on which Kate is working as a flight attendant. He is hesitant about dating her because he recently ended a bad marriage. His eight-year-old son from that marriage, Monty, takes an instant dislike to Kate. In the series finale, Evan tells Kate that he loves her and Kate tells him that she wants to move to St. Louis with him, but not until Tara finishes her treatment.

=== Sandi Gregson ===
Sandi Gregson (Frances Conroy), Max's mother, appears in season three. She is described as being a recluse with a compulsive hoarding problem. She admits to being difficult to live with and believes that her husband was right to have left her when he did, his only mistake being that he chose to leave his son, Max, behind. Marshall goes to live with her for a brief time after his altercation with the depraved alter Bryce Craine. She later returns home with him and attempts to convince Max to leave Tara, just as her husband left her.

== Other characters ==
=== Benjamin Lambert ===
Benjamin Lambert (Shiloh Fernandez), Kate's boyfriend during the pilot episode. He took Kate's virginity, and was given the nickname "Sex Robot". During an argument with Kate where he hits her, Tara intervenes by reminding Kate that she told her not to be pushed around by boys wearing ponytails, to which Benjamin replies, "They're samurai knots." Benjamin is targeted by Buck after Kate's ballet recital, and then beaten up by Buck and Marshall when Buck reveals Ben's previous actions towards the rest of the family. He is last shown in the episode "Revolution" where he crashes Kate and Marshall's house party, along with his new girlfriend.

=== Don Hubbard ===
Don Hubbard (Kevin Symons), who was only seen once in the show when Buck had taken over, lived next door to the Gregsons before shooting himself at the start of season 2. After his death, Max bought the house and renovated it. Tara feels very weird about Hubbard's story. Most of her relapses or memories take place in his house. Once she wakes up on his grave. In an open house, Alice came out and treated the event as Hubbard's funeral. When Lynda visits the Gregsons' house, she discovers a portrait of Hubbard that Tara (or one of the alters) painted, of which she has no memory. Shoshana's office is located in Hubbard's house. Just before her apparent death, Alice confesses that she loved Don.

=== Mimi Parmeter ===
Mimi (Kathleen Noone) served as Tara and Charmaine's foster mother when they were temporarily removed from the Craine home following Bryce's abuse of Tara—a fact that neither Tara nor Charmaine was aware of until Tara began to dream of her. They asked their mother about Mimi, but their mother dodged the questions and feigned ignorance. The two sisters found Mimi, hoping that Mimi might be able to provide Tara with some answers and help her to understand the cause of her DID. Mimi is very similar to Tara's alter Alice in terms of appearance, style of clothing, tone of voice and manners.
