= Taking Chances (2009 film) =

2009 film by Kit Umbrage

- DVD cover
- Directed by: Kit Umbrage
- Screenplay by: Annie Nocenti
- Story by: Annie Nocenti
- Produced by: Lori Christopher, Larry Furlong, Michael Aguilar, David Guy Levy
- Starring: Justin Long; Emmanuelle Chriqui; Rob Corddry; Keir O'Donnell; Nick Offerman; Missi Pyle; David Jensen; Jimmi Simpson; Brian Howe; Phil Reeves
- Cinematography: Steve Gainer
- Edited by: Joe Klotz
- Distributed by: Lionsgate
- Release date: November 2009
- Running time: 99 minutes
- Country: United States
- Language: English

Taking Chances is a 2009 comedy film directed by Kit Umbrage. The story by Annie Nocenti follows Chase Revere, manager of the local history museum, who discovers that an Indian casino is about to be built over the town's Revolutionary War battlefield. He joins forces with the sexy town siren, Lucy Shanks, to launch an all-out offensive against the project. They encounter fierce opposition from the corrupt mayor, the town council and local citizens, who believe that the casino will cure the bankrupt town's financial woes.

== Plot ==
Chase Revere manages Patriotville's history museum, the run-down town's sole tourist attraction. Having inherited a love of history from his late mother, Chase happily devotes most of his free time to maintaining the museum's exhibits, directing reenactments on the site of a Revolutionary War battle, and preparing a proposal to expand the museum. His friend Digs, who has devoted himself to having sex with as many high school girls as possible, is disgusted at this and wants Chase to join him on the dating scene.

A group of Native Americans arrive in town, taking up temporary residence in the hotel run by Chase's father, to consider setting up a casino in Patriotville. They negotiate with the town government for a bribe by threatening to have the casino built in Sulfur Falls instead. Feeling the town needs the casino to keep from going bankrupt, the mayor resorts to taking $1,000,000 out of various town projects to fund the bribe.

Chase spots a girl, Lucy, trying to get into her father's car. She sets the interior on fire and convinces Chase to give her a ride away from the scene before he realizes what's happening. Lucy comes from Sulfur Falls and tracked her father to Patriotville after he abandoned Lucy and her mother for another woman. Though she claims to be after a family heirloom that her father took, Chase intuits that Lucy is obsessed with her father. Intrigued, he asks for her phone number.

Digs, whose father is on the town council, tells Chase about the casino deal. Chase is incensed even before learning that the proposed building site is the historical battlefield, believing that the casino will desecrate the town's culture. Digs also advises against dating Lucy, since his cousin dated her and says she is resolutely chaste. Chase and Lucy's first date seems to go well, but she firmly refuses his request for a kiss.

Chase and Lucy start a petition to put the casino issue to a vote. They meet opposition from both the government and the general citizenry, who seem convinced that the casino's financial benefits outweigh the battlefield's historical value. They tear up their fliers, call upon legal technicalities to shut down their protests, make threatening phone calls, vandalize their houses, print news articles describing them as communists, and fire Chase from the museum. Chase's father is unsupportive, and seemingly pays no attention to anything Chase says. Chase and the Native Americans maintain their budding friendship, expressing mutual respect even in their disagreement.

The mayor's wife confronts Chase and Lucy with a selfie of Lucy and the mayor having sex. A deflated Chase walks away in silence. Digs tries to stifle Chase's hopes of reconciliation by psychoanalyzing Lucy, saying her affair with the mayor is undoubtedly part of a pattern of having sex with older men and breaking the hearts of would-be "saviors" like Chase in a subconscious act of revenge against her father.

The mayor's wife tape records the mayor discussing the casino bribe and gives the tape to Lucy in retribution for his philandering. Lucy finds Chase and confesses that, much as Digs suspected, the mayor is the third married man in a position of authority who she had an affair with, but also says that she is giving up this behavior. They then have sex. She shows him the tape, and he tells her to bring it to a rally they have planned. An agent facilitating the casino deal is listening in and tells the mayor. He finds Lucy and offers to trade her father's address for the tape. Lucy gives over the tape while Chase is humiliated at the rally outside, playing for time in hopes of Lucy arriving with the tape.

Chase finally realizes that Lucy does not really care about him, that the casino's victory gave just about everyone in town what they wanted, and that he has a larger role in life than safeguarding Patriotville's "minor league" history. The Native Americans depart from Patriotville after receiving the $1,000,000 bribe and giving Chase a new name, "Chase with Plenty Horses", meaning he will go far. While cleaning their room, he finds actors' makeup and a wanted poster which clue him in that the "Native Americans" are actually con men. They left him a car as a gift, which he packs with his belongings and drives out of town. After the revelation that Patriotville is not really getting a casino, the mayor and his cohorts are imprisoned for the abuse of town funds.

== Cast ==
- Justin Long as Chase Revere, town historian who opposes an Indian casino
- Emmanuelle Chriqui as Lucy Shanks, a mysterious siren
- Rob Corddry as Cleveland Fishback, the town mayor
- Keir O'Donnell as Digger Morris
- Nick Offerman as Sheriff Hoke Hollander
- Missi Pyle as Faith Fishback, the mayor's wife
- Jimmi Simpson as Charlie Cabonara

== Production ==
The film was originally entitled Patriotville, after its fictional town. It was shot on location in South Carolina.

In 2012, co-screenwriter Annie Nocenti blogged, "I hate this movie. I wrote it as a crime heist with a slut as the star and by the time it was finished it was a romance and she was a virgin."
