= Polly Morgan (cinematographer) =

British cinematographer

- Born: London
- Education: University of Leeds (BA, 2002); AFI Conservatory (MFA, 2010)
- Occupation: Cinematographer
- Years active: 2011-present

Polly Morgan is a British cinematographer who has worked on a half-dozen studio feature films since 2019. Morgan is accredited by the British Society of Cinematographers (BSC) and the American Society of Cinematographers (ASC). To date, she is the only woman to be a member of both, and she is the youngest member of ASC.

Prior to becoming cinematographer, Morgan worked in the film and television industries since the early 2000s as a production assistant and in multiple roles of the camera department. She worked under numerous cinematographers and attended the American Film Institute's AFI Conservatory as a Fulbright Scholar, graduating in 2010 with a Master of Fine Arts degree in cinematography. Morgan's first cinematography credit was the film Venom (2011). She worked as cinematographer on other numerous films and TV series throughout the 2010s, with her first studio feature-film credit being Lucy in the Sky (2019). In 2024, she was cinematographer for the films Marmalade and Back to Black.

== Background ==
Morgan was born in London. She was raised in West Sussex. Her grandfather liked to draw, sparking her interest in art. When she was 13 years old, a film crew from Channel 4 came to her family's farm to film a documentary about composer Edward Elgar. The experience introduced her to filmmaking. As a teenager, she studied art history and photography. At University of Leeds, she earned a Bachelor of Arts degree in broadcasting, which had a program that gave students hands-on experience with single-camera productions.

== Career ==
Morgan is accredited by the American Society of Cinematographers (ASC) and the British Society of Cinematographers (BSC). To date, she is the only woman to be a member of both, and she is the youngest member of ASC. She described in 2016 her cinematography style, "My style is a blend between a naturalistic, free approach with a more classical, conventional approach."

In 2016, Variety named Morgan as one of 10 cinematographers to watch in their growth. In 2025, Elle recognized Morgan in their "power list" of 40 women in film and television, calling her "a trailblazing British cinematographer".

=== 2000s to 2010: Lead-up to cinematography ===
Before Polly Morgan became a cinematographer, she spent around ten years working in film and television, including six years as an assistant. She first started in film working on sets as a production assistant for a Canadian director in Toronto. She then moved to London with her PA experience. In 2002, she was hired as an in-house production assistant at RSA Films (founded by Ridley Scott and Tony Scott), based in London. As a PA on a music video, she met cinematographer Haris Zambarloukos, who hired her as a camera trainee. In the following six years, she worked on commercials for Zamarloukos as a loader and as an assistant camera. Cinematographers she worked with included Wally Pfister, Seamus McGarvey, Dan Mindel, Caleb Deschanel, and Alwin Kuchler. She had met Kuchler when she was an assistant camera. She then worked for him in Canada and the United Kingdom as an assistant, eventually working for him as a camera operator and a second-unit director of photography.

In 2006, Morgan attended lighting and camera workshops in the US state of Maine, where she met cinematographer and ASC member Michael Goi, who became her mentor for numerous years. Zambarloukos encouraged Morgan to attend the American Film Institute's AFI Conservatory, and Goi wrote a reference for her. In 2008, she received a Fulbright Fellowship that enabled her to move to Los Angeles and attend the conservatory. While she was at the AFI Conservatory, she assisted Pfister on numerous commercials; she also interned for him as production assistant when he worked on the 2010 film Inception. She graduated from the AFI Conservatory in 2010 with a Master of Fine Arts degree in cinematography. In 2012, she was given the Rising Stars of Cinematography award by the ASC.

=== 2011-2018: Initial work as cinematographer ===
Morgan's first feature film credit as cinematographer was Venom (2011), followed by The Evil Inside (2011), Rock Jocks (2012), and Junkie (2012). She was also cinematographer for two independent feature films released in 2013: The Pretty One and The Truth About Emanuel. The latter film premiered at the Sundance Film Festival in 2013, and in subsequent film festivals, Morgan was recognized for her cinematography, including the Best Cinematography award at the 2013 Brooklyn Film Festival. Afterward, several films she worked on premiered at Sundance, South by Southwest, and Tribeca Film Festival. She also worked on several TV productions in the United Kingdom and the United States. One of her TV contributions was a result of Goi hiring her to shoot additional photography for almost a dozen episodes of the TV series American Horror Story. Morgan has also worked on music videos and TV commercials.

In the late 2010s, Morgan was cinematographer for several works outside of the United Kingdom. She lensed several episodes of the TV series Legion (2017–2019) and the films The Intervention (2016), Slumber (2017), and Spinning Man (2018). The British Film Institute said for Slumber, Morgan "created nightmarish visuals", and for The Intervention, she provided an "intimate, intense look". The BFI said of her cinematography in the latter, "The relaxed aesthetic [gives] way to sharper angles and deeper shadows as the story evolves and motivations are revealed."

In 2018, Morgan became a member of the ASC, having been recommended by Goi, Dean Cundey, and Robert Primes. In 2019, she was nominated for an ASC award for Episode of a Series for Commercial Television for her cinematography of the Legion episode "Chapter 23". The Hollywood Reporter wrote that Morgan was "a rare female nominee".

=== 2019 to present: Studio feature-film work ===
Morgan's cinematography work on Legion led its showrunner Noah Hawley to hire her as cinematographer for his 2019 film Lucy in the Sky, which, as a Fox Searchlight Pictures production, was her first credit for a studio feature film. Following that, she was hired as cinematographer for the 2020 film A Quiet Place Part II by Paramount Pictures.

During the COVID-19 pandemic, in mid-2020, Morgan read the book Where the Crawdads Sing and related to it with her own remote upbringing. In the following October, when she learned a film adaptation was in development, she petitioned director Olivia Newman and made a pitch deck to present. She was hired as cinematographer for the film, Where the Crawdads Sing, which Sony Pictures Releasing released in 2022. During the making of Where the Crawdads Sing, Morgan and her agent discussed the developing film The Woman King, and the agent referred Morgan to producer Cathy Schulman, who hired her for the film. It was also released in 2022 under Sony Pictures Releasing. In 2024, Morgan was cinematographer for Legend of the Lizard, a 15-minute mockumentary about the GEICO gecko mascot. She was also cinematographer for the 2024 films Marmalade and Back to Black.

== Credits ==
Morgan's cinematography credits for film
Year	Title	Notes	Ref.
2011	Venom	First cinematography credit	
2011	The Evil Inside		
2012	Rock Jocks		
2012	Junkie		
2013	The Truth About Emanuel		
2013	The Pretty One		
2014	We'll Never Have Paris		
2014	Drawing Out Genius		
2016	Holy Hell	Credited with Will Allen	
2016	The Intervention		
2016	The Other Side of the Door	Pick-up unit	
2017	Slumber		
2018	6 Balloons		
2018	Spinning Man		
2019	Lucy in the Sky		
2020	A Quiet Place Part II		
2022	Where the Crawdads Sing		
2022	The Woman King		
2024	Marmalade		
2024	Back to Black		
2027	Children of Blood and Bone	Post-production	

Morgan's cinematography credits for television
Year(s)	Title	Notes	Ref.
2012–2014	American Horror Story (2011 to present)	11 episodes (10 as additional director of photography, 1 as camera operator)	
2015	From Darkness (2015)	4 episodes	
2015	Call the Midwife (2012 to present)	2 episodes, director of photography	
2016	The A Word (2016 to present)	2 episodes	
2018	Strange Angel (2018–2019)	2 episodes, director of photography	
2018–2019	Legion (2017–2019)	9 episodes (3 as director of photography)	
2020	Sarah Cooper: Everything's Fine	Comedy special, director of photography	
