= Marmalade (film) =

2024 romantic heist film

- Film poster
- Directed by: Keir O'Donnell
- Written by: Keir O'Donnell
- Produced by: Marc Goldberg; Jason Shapiro; James Harris; Mark Lane; Sarah Gabriel
- Starring: Joe Keery; Camila Morrone; Aldis Hodge
- Cinematography: Polly Morgan
- Edited by: Stewart Reeves
- Music by: Brooke Blair; Will Blair
- Production companies: Signature Films; Tea Shop Productions
- Release date: 9 February 2024
- Running time: 99 minutes
- Country: United Kingdom
- Language: English
- Box office: $13,385

Marmalade is a 2024 romantic heist film written and directed by Keir O'Donnell in his directorial feature debut, and starring Joe Keery, Camila Morrone and Aldis Hodge.

Marmalade was released in cinemas and on demand on 9 February 2024.

== Plot ==
In a small town, Baron is a simple-minded yet kind-hearted young man, who finds himself incarcerated. Sharing his cell is Otis, an experienced escape artist, who is initially reluctant to assist Baron in escaping but changes his mind after Baron's offer of $250,000 for a successful escape. When questioned about the money, Baron recounts his life's story, beginning with his devotion to his terminally ill mother, Eda, who loves Moon Pie snacks, and his subsequent losing his job at the local post office due to his refusal to cut his hair.

Baron's life takes a pivotal turn when he meets Marmalade, a young woman haunted by a traumatic childhood in foster care. Their relationship deepens, marked by shared vulnerabilities and a desperate plan to secure their future through a bank robbery, spurred by the dire need to pay for Eda’s medication. The plan derails when Marmalade impulsively attempts a robbery, leading to a tragic series of events culminating in Eda’s death under mysterious circumstances.

As Baron pours out his heart, Otis reveals his own painful connection to his sick mother in Jamaica, creating an unexpected bond between them. Their camaraderie is interrupted by a prison riot, during which Otis's true identity as an undercover FBI agent targeting Marmalade, a notorious bank robber, is unveiled. Otis proposes a fake escape to ensnare Marmalade, with the reluctant agreement of his FBI team.

Resuming his tale, Baron explains the reluctant continuation of the robbery plan, driven by Marmalade’s claimed pregnancy. The heist turns out to be surprisingly lucrative, but it also leads to unexpected revelations when Baron cleans the getaway car and discovers his mother’s medication in it, leading to a painful realization about Marmalade’s manipulations and duplicity and resulting in a separation between her and Baron.

Baron eludes the FBI in a daring escape, only to unveil further layers of deception. His final act of transformation and a trail of clues lead Otis to a shocking revelation: Baron himself has been the mastermind behind the heist, with Marmalade a figment of his complex deception. In a farewell letter with a first-class ticket to Kingston, Jamaica left for Otis at a nearby travel agency, Baron reflects on the importance of caring for one’s loved ones.

The film closes with Baron, now revealed as a caring doctor in a nursing home, tenderly attending to his mother Eda.

== Cast ==
- Joe Keery as Baron
- Camila Morrone as Marmalade
- Aldis Hodge as Otis
- Amy Warner as Mama Eda
- Gage Rantala as Young Baron

== Production ==
The film was co-produced by Signature Entertainment and Tea Shop Productions, with Sarah Gabriel and Marc Goldberg being the producers for Signature, and with James Harris and Mark Lane producing for Tea Shop. It was made in association with Jason Shapiro from the film production company Silver Lining Entertainment. Polly Morgan worked as the cinematographer on the project.

Keery, Morrone and Hodge were revealed to be in the cast in July 2022.

Principal photography wrapped in Minnesota in July 2022.

== Release ==
Marmalade had a theatrical release in Russia and the CIS on 8 February 2024, followed by a limited theatrical release in the United States and a release on digital on 9 February 2024.

== Reception ==
On the review aggregator website Rotten Tomatoes, 70% of 37 critics' reviews are positive, with an average rating of 6.4/10. Metacritic, which uses a weighted average, assigned the film a score of 52 out of 100, based on seven critics, indicating "mixed or average" reviews.

Writing for The Guardian, Leslie Felperin praised the film for the chemistry between its lead performers and for its "surprisingly poignant" ending.
