= United States of Tara =

American television comedy drama

- Genre: Comedy drama
- Created by: Diablo Cody
- Showrunners: Alexa Junge (season 1); Diablo Cody (season 2–3); Joey Soloway (season 2–3)
- Starring: Toni Collette; Rosemarie DeWitt; John Corbett; Keir Gilchrist; Brie Larson
- Theme music composer: Tim DeLaughter
- Country of origin: United States
- Original language: English
- No. of seasons: 3
- No. of episodes: 36 (list of episodes)

Production
- Executive producers: Steven Spielberg; Diablo Cody; Alexa Junge (season 1); Joey Soloway (season 2–3); Darryl Frank; Justin Falvey; Craig Zisk (season 2–3)
- Producer: Dan Kaplow
- Production locations: Overland Park, Kansas (setting); Los Angeles, California (actual filming location)
- Camera setup: Single-camera
- Running time: 30 minutes
- Production companies: DreamWorks Television; Showtime Networks

Original release
- Network: Showtime
- Release: January 18, 2009 – June 20, 2011

United States of Tara is an American comedy drama television series created by Diablo Cody, which aired on Showtime from January 18, 2009 to June 20, 2011. The series follows the life of Tara (Toni Collette), a suburban artist and mother coping with dissociative identity disorder.

The series was based on an idea by Steven Spielberg, who is the executive producer, under his DreamWorks Television label. Other executive producers include writers Darryl Frank, Justin Falvey, director Craig Zisk, and showrunners Cody and Joey Soloway. Former executive producer Alexa Junge quit as showrunner after the first season.

Principal photography took place in Los Angeles, California, while the show is set in Overland Park, Kansas. Collette won the 2009 Primetime Emmy Award and 2010 Golden Globe Award for Best Actress in a Comedy Series for her role; the opening title sequence also won an Emmy. The show's third and final season premiered on March 28, 2011.

On May 23, 2011, Showtime announced that the series would not be renewed for a fourth season, and the series finale aired on June 20, 2011.

== Plot ==
The show is a representation of a seemingly typical American family who must cope with the daily struggles of dissociative identity disorder (DID). Tara Gregson is a wife and mother of two children in Overland Park, Kansas, a suburb of Kansas City, who has been diagnosed with DID. Suffering side effects from the medication, she is depressed at her inability to focus, to feel, to be intimate, to create art, and to progress in therapy to discover the painful source of her dissociation. With approval from her therapist, she discontinues the medication, knowing that multiple personalities will reemerge.

When stressed, Tara may transition into one of her alters: wild and flirty teenager T; 1950s style housewife Alice; and male, loud, beer-drinking Vietnam vet Buck. A fourth alter, Gimme, is introduced later in the first season. During the second season, two further personalities are introduced: Shoshana, Tara's therapist of sorts, and Chicken, an infantile representation of Tara when she was five years old. Another alter emerges in Season 3, that of Tara's previously unknown half-brother Bryce. Tara is supported by her husband Max, daughter Kate, and son Marshall. Her sister, Charmaine, is not very supportive of Tara, expressing doubts about the validity of her sister's disorder, though she becomes increasingly more understanding and receptive as the series progresses.

== Characters ==
- Tara Gregson (née Craine) (Toni Collette), a woman with dissociative identity disorder
- Max Gregson (John Corbett), Tara's supportive husband
- Kate Gregson (Brie Larson), Tara and Max's spirited teenage daughter
- Marshall Gregson (Keir Gilchrist), Tara and Max's gay cinephile son
- Charmaine Craine (Rosemarie DeWitt), Tara's self-absorbed younger sister
- Neil (Patton Oswalt): Max's employee and best friend
- Gene Stuart: (Nate Corddry), Kate's boss at Barnaby's, a fast food outlet.

== Production ==
The show was conceived by executive producer Steven Spielberg and his wife Kate Capshaw, while discussing the compartmentalization of the typical human psyche. The staff members were challenged with making a comedy show that is counteracted by the unknowable but believable anguish of severe mental illness. They wanted a widely relatable story of fragmentation of the self, and of the loving perseverance of the family. Executive producer Alexa Junge said, "It never comes from making fun of a woman who can't control herself." Series creator Diablo Cody said she was "nervous" about making the pilot funny but not a sitcom, while being sensitive to a mental disorder. Therefore, the disorder was researched and then the scripts were reviewed by dissociative identity disorder expert and medical school professor, Richard Kluft.

Portia Doubleday was cast as Kate in the pilot episode of United States of Tara. Doubleday was replaced by Brie Larson when the series' creative team chose to go in a different direction with the character.

Diablo Cody didn't expect the pilot to reach series status, so she considered "three seasons in the lion's den" to be exceptional. She emphatically appreciated the writers, but was pressured with the expectation of writing more "gobbledygook banter" as seen in her recent hit movie Juno; she disliked the institution of the writers' room and wished that it had been primarily a solo effort. She said Steven Spielberg was "incredibly involved", offering "his soul and his input" to the series. She was sad to learn of the cancellation especially without a proper finale, but was fairly satisfied with "a nice, natural end".

== Episodes ==
| Season | Episodes | Originally released | |
| Season | Episodes | First released | Last released |
|---|---|---|---|
| 1 | 12 | January 18, 2009 | April 5, 2009 |
| 2 | 12 | March 22, 2010 | June 7, 2010 |
| 3 | 12 | March 28, 2011 | June 20, 2011 |

== Broadcast ==
The series premiered on the American network Showtime on January 18, 2009. On February 10, 2009, after only four episodes had aired, Showtime Networks president of entertainment Robert Greenblatt announced that United States of Tara would be renewed for a second season, to consist of twelve episodes and air in early 2010. He said the early renewal decision came after the show averaged 2.67 million viewers per week, giving the network its highest ratings since 2004, when Nielsen Media Research began counting original shows on premium channels in its prime time ratings. Season two premiered on March 22, 2010.

On March 25, three days after the season 2 premiere, it was announced that it would be picked up for a third season which aired in spring 2011. Season 3 officially premiered on March 28, 2011. On May 23, 2011, it was announced that the series would not be renewed for a fourth season.

== Reception ==
=== Critical reception ===
Critical response to the show was positive, with many reviewers praising Collette's acting. According to Metacritic, which assigns a rating out of 100 to reviews from mainstream critics, the show's first season holds a score of 63 out of 100, indicating "generally favorable reviews", based on 24 reviews. Season 2 has 79% with 10 reviews, and Season 3 has 84% ("universal acclaim") with 5 reviews.

Troy Patterson of Slate gave high praise to Diablo Cody's infamous style of snarky pop-culture dialog, and to the cast, concluding that "The most elusive of the personalities is Tara herself, and that's as it should be." Emily Nussbaum of Vulture saw Tara as "the true sister act" to Dexter, Showtime's other hit show at the time, with a more feminine focus on the allegorical roots of mental illness. She said it "has slowly taken its premise deeper, bolder places than I ever expected, all while maintaining an arch-comic tone that could sour if it weren’t so smart. Far more ambitious than bloated award bait like Boardwalk Empire, it has become a truly original series, a dark comedy about sexual abuse, swinging at existential questions about its heroine's struggle to become a real girl." Alan Sepinwall of HitFix said that Tara has "gotten deeper, darker and just plain better as it's gone along" where sometimes "the Gregson family seems in danger of splintering as badly as Tara's psyche".

In a 2014 retrospective, Ariana Bacle at Entertainment Weekly said that she was "still not over" the show's premature cancellation. She said the show portrays mental illness in a realistic, humanizing, and normalizing way that gives appropriate weight to the lives of all the family members who were overwhelmed but not totally consumed by one's mental illness. She found it "dark" but "consistently funny, never taking itself too seriously". She praised Toni Collette's "flawless" transition between personalities that are so multilayered yet "insanely distinct" that they could have each been a different actor.

=== Awards and nominations ===
| Year | Award | Category | Nominee | Result |
|---|---|---|---|---|
| 2009 | Emmy Award | Outstanding Lead Actress in a Comedy Series | Toni Collette | Won |
| 2009 | Emmy Award | Outstanding Casting for a Comedy Series | Allison Jones, Cami Patton and Elizabeth Barnes | Nominated |
| 2009 | Emmy Award | Outstanding Main Title Design | Jamie Caliri, Dave Finkel, Brett Baer and Alex Jukasz | Won |
| 2009 | Emmy Award | Outstanding Original Main Title Theme Music | Tim Delaughter | Nominated |
| 2010 | Golden Globe Award | Best Actress – Television Series Musical or Comedy | Toni Collette | Won |
| 2010 | Emmy Award | Outstanding Lead Actress in a Comedy Series | Toni Collette | Nominated |
| 2010 | Emmy Award | Outstanding Casting for a Comedy Series | Cami Patton and Jennifer Lare | Nominated |
| 2010 | Screen Actors Guild Award | Outstanding Performance by a Female Actor in a Comedy Series | Toni Collette | Nominated |
| 2010 | GLAAD Media Award | Outstanding Comedy Series | | Nominated |
| 2011 | Golden Globe Award | Best Actress – Television Series Musical or Comedy | Toni Collette | Nominated |

== Home media ==
| DVD Name | Release Date | No. of episodes | Additional Content |
|---|---|---|---|
| The First Season | Region 1: December 29, 2009; Region 4: November 3, 2011 | 12 | Sitting Down with Diablo Cody; Audio Commentary; Tara's Alters; Podcast interviews with Toni Collette, John Corbett, Rosemarie DeWitt and Brie Larson; On The Set; First two episodes of Californication season 2; Episode 2 of The Tudors season 3; Bonus Disc: The first two episodes of Nurse Jackie (Best Buy exclusive) |
| The Second Season | Region 1: December 28, 2010 | 12 | "Chats with the Cast" – Short interviews with the cast; Cast bios |
| The Third and Final Season | Region 1: August 2, 2011 | 12 | |

Episodes 1 and 2 are available as bonus features on DVD disc 4 (of 4) of Season 3 of Dexter, and on disc 4 (of 4) of Season 3 of The Tudors.

In Australia, United States of Tara was rated MA 15+, and in New Zealand, it was rated R13 for offensive language and sexual references.
