= Worm (2013 film) =

- DVD cover
- Directed by: Doug Mallette
- Produced by: Jennifer Bonior; Julian Herrera; Doug Mallette; Jeremy Pearce
- Starring: John Ferguson; Shane O'Brien; Jes Mercer
- Cinematography: Rob Bennett
- Edited by: Ryan Kendrick
- Music by: Bill Mitchell
- Production company: Untrademarked Productions
- Distributed by: Synapse Films
- Release dates: April 18, 2013 (Nashville Film Festival); August 12, 2014
- Running time: 94 minutes
- Language: English

Worm is a 2013 American science fiction horror film directed by Doug Mallette and starring John Ferguson, Jes Mercer, and Shane O’Brien. Produced by Untrademarked Productions, the film was released by Synapse Films on August 12, 2015.

== Plot ==
Small town journalist, Posey Mapleton, does a Special Report on Fantasites, a genetically engineered parasite that allows users to once again dream - an ability they all lost 30 years ago. Seeing the new miracle product as a way escape his boring life, socially inept maintenance man, Charles, attempts to purchase Fantasites but discovers he can only afford the cheaper Economy version as opposed to the highly sought after Premium. When his Economy worms are not enough to impress his neighbor, Reed (a Premium user), Charles considers giving up Fantasites all together. But when a delivery of Premium worms are left outside Reed's apartment, Charles decides to start swapping them for his undesired Economy worms. With the Premium Fantasites in his possession, Charles is finally able to live out his wildest fantasies.

With a new found confidence, Charles’ focus soon shifts from wanting Reed to be his friend to starting a romantic relationship with Reed's live-in girlfriend, June. Out of pity, June pressures Reed into becoming friends with the lonely maintenance man. The plan backfires and Reed humiliates Charles at a dinner date that Charles had hoped would be only between himself and June.

Completely heartbroken, Charles throws himself into Fantasites, continuing to steal from Reed and becoming more detached from others and more lost in his dreams. Soon, the harmful side effects and addictive nature of Fantasites become a national concern, and the worms are made illegal.

Desperate to continue using, Charles turns to Reed who has found a way to continue getting Fantasites through an underground network. Hoping to continue to use worms and wanting to provide for June, who turns out is a fellow Fantasite addict suffering from withdrawals, Charles commits himself to a dangerous group of Fantasite-masked men. The group is run by Stephen, who has found a way to reclaim worms by smashing the skulls of users and re-selling the worms extracted from their brains.

Believing that a home invasion on a house of high-class users will give him enough worms to escape with June for good, Charles takes Reed up on an offer for a final job. When the home invasion turns into a massacre, Reed steals the worms and leaves Charles to take the blame.

When Charles attempts to reconnect with June and make their escape, she turns him down, knowing they will eventually be tracked down. Not accepting this future, Charles returns to the apartment for June, not knowing that Stephen and his Fantasite-masked men had already found Reed and June. He arrives too late to save his love and decides to once more use a Fantasite and find her in his dreams.

== Cast ==
- John Ferguson as Charles
- Jes Mercer as June
- Shane O’Brien as Reed
- Sarah Shoemaker as Posey Mapleton
- Scott Ferguson as Pop
- Josh Matthews as Stephen
- Mark DeMaio as Walt
- Michael Wilson as Mr. Rabon

== Release ==
The film premiered at the Nashville Film Festival in 2013. It was released on DVD and VOD by Synapse Films on August 12, 2014.

== Reception ==
Worm was met with critical acclaim upon its release. Generating buzz from indie genre sites, the now defunct Film Threat called it "an exceptional film that masters its diverse mix of tone, proving its storytellers to be both ambitious and skilled." The UK Horror Scene called it "an original, modern tale of love and addiction plus the isolation and desperation that both these subjects can sometimes cause." Worm also landed on several sites' "Top Horror Films of the Year" lists including Film Bizarro, Goregasmic Cinema, and 22 Shots Of Moodz and Horror.
